= List of busiest ports by cargo tonnage =

Shipping destinations by mass handled

This list ranks the busiest seaports by cargo tonnage, which refers to the total mass, or in some cases the volume, of cargo transported through each port. The rankings are based on AAPA world port data.

The cargo rankings based on tonnage should be interpreted with caution, since these measures are not directly comparable and cannot be standardized into a single unit. In the Measure column, MT = Metric Tons, HT = Harbor Tons, FT = Freight Tons, and RT = Revenue Tons.

== 2022 ==
Rank	Port	Country	Kilotons
1	Ningbo-Zhoushan	China	1,261,340
2	Tangshan	China	768,870
3	Shanghai	China	727,770
4	Qingdao	China	657,540
5	Guangzhou	China	655,920
6	Singapore	Singapore	578,190
7	Suzhou	China	572,760
8	Rizhao	China	570,570
9	Port Hedland	Australia	566,210
10	Tianjin	China	549,020
11	Rotterdam	Netherlands	467,390
12	Yantai	China	462,570
13	Busan	South Korea	424,920
14	Beibu Gulf	China	371,340
15	Taizhou	China	364,440
16	Jiangyin	China	350,620
17	Huanghua	China	315,100
18	Dalian	China	306,130
19	Fuzhou	China	301,640
20	Lianyungang	China	301,110

== 2018–2019 ==
Rank	Port	Country		2019 kiloton	2018 kiloton
1	Ningbo-Zhoushan	China	MT	1,120,090	1,038,080
2	Shanghai	China	MT	716,770	716,590
3	Tangshan	China		656,740	636,990
4	Singapore	Singapore	FT	626,180	630,130
5	Guangzhou	China	MT	606,160	538,330
6	Qingdao	China	MT	577,360	541,610
7	Suzhou	China		522,750	531,790
8	Port Hedland	Australia	MT	521,880	517,990
9	Tianjin	China	MT	492,200	472,810
10	Rotterdam	Netherlands	MT	469,400	468,980
11	Rizhao	China		463,770	437,520
12	Busan	South Korea	RT	455,910	450,220
13	Yantai	China		386,320	333,610
14	Dalian	China	MT	366,410	351,300
15	Nantong	China	MT	336,200	265,980
16	Zhanjiang	China		329,160	157,720
17	Huanghua	China		287,160	287,160
18	Taizhou	China		282,430	255,130
19	Gwangyang	South Korea	RT	276,040	268,130
20	Hong Kong	China	MT	263,320	258,540

== 2012–2017 ==
Volumes in kilotons
Rank	Port	Country		2017	2016	2015	2014	2013	2012
1	Ningbo-Zhoushan	China	MT	1,077,110	922,092	889,000	873,470	810,000	744,000
2	Shanghai	China	MT	705,630	647,446	646,514	678,376	696,985	644,659
3	Singapore	Singapore	FT	626,170	593,297	575,846	581,268	560,888	538,012
4	Suzhou	China		607,740	573,760				
5	Guangzhou	China	MT	566,190	544,374	475,481	500,975	472,760	438,000
6	Tangshan	China		565,400	515,800				
7	Port Hedland	Australia	MT	512,330	484,510	452,940	446,922	488,000	288,443
8	Qingdao	China	MT	506,990	443,978	476,216	465,055	450,111	407,340
9	Tianjin	China	MT	502,840	428,098	440,430	445,780	477,399	477,000
10	Rotterdam	Netherlands	MT	467,350	461,177	466,363	444,733	440,464	441,527
11	Dalian	China	MT	451,050	318,413	320,658	337,366	320,843	303,000
12	Busan	South Korea	RT	400,510	349,708	347,713	335,411	313,295	298,689
13	Yingkou	China		362,390	347,020				
14	Rizhao	China		360,020	350,620				
15	South Louisiana	United States	MT	307,860	237,594	235,058	242,578	216,445	228,677
16	Gwangyang	South Korea	RT	291,830	283,106	272,007	134,947	127,642	109,730
17	Yantai	China		285,600	265,360				
18	Hong Kong	China	MT	281,550	256,730	256,488	297,737	276,055	269,282
19	Zhanjiang	China		281,520	255,170				
20	Huanghua	China		269,570	245,110				

== Rankings 2004–2011 ==
Volumes in kilotons
Rank	Port	Country	Measure	2011	2010	2009	2008	2007	2006	2005	2004
1	Shanghai	China	MT	590,439	534,371	505,715	508,000	561,446	537,000	443,000	378,962
2	Singapore	Singapore	FT	531,176	501,566	472,300	515,415	483,616	448,500	423,267	393,418
3	Tianjin	China	MT	459,941	400,000	381,110	365,163	309,465	257,600	245,100	206,161
4	Rotterdam	Netherlands	MT	434,551	429,926	386,957	421,136	401,181	378,400	376,600	352,563
5	Guangzhou	China	MT	431,000	425,600	364,000	347,000	341,363	302,800	241,700	215,190
6	Qingdao	China	MT	372,000	350,120	274,304	278,271	265,020	224,200	184,300	161,650
7	Ningbo	China	MT	348,911	408,180	371,540	361,850	471,630	309,700	272,400	225,850
8	Qinhuangdao	China	MT	284,600	276,815	243,850	252,000	245,964	204,900	167,500	150,320
9	Busan	South Korea	RT	281,513	262,963	226,182	241,683	243,564	217,900	217,200	219,760
10	Hong Kong	China	MT	277,444	267,815	242,967	259,402	245,433	238,200	230,139	220,879
11	Port Hedland	Australia	MT	246,672	198,997	178,625	159,391	130,707	111,800	110,600	108,500
12	South Louisiana	United States	MT	223,633	214,337	192,853	203,157	207,785	204,600	192,549	203,517
13	Houston	United States	MT	215,731	206,055	191,729	192,473	196,014	201,500	192,023	183,419
14	Dalian	China	MT	211,065	200,000	204,000	246,000	222,859	200,500	176,800	145,162
15	Shenzhen	China	MT	205,475	204,860	211,000	187,045	199,190	176,000	153,900	135,246
16	Klang	Malaysia	FT	193,726	168,588	137,615	152,348	135,514	122,000	109,700	99,911
17	Antwerp	Belgium	MT	187,151	178,167	157,807	189,390	182,897	167,400	160,100	152,300
18	Nagoya	Japan	FT	186,305	185,703	165,101	218,130	215,602	208,000	187,100	182,289
19	Dampier	Australia	MT	171,844	165,025	N/A	140,823	133,949	126,000	110,100	87,92
20	Ulsan	South Korea	RT	163,181	150,933	170,314	170,279	168,652	161,100	103,50	156,500

== 2005 ==
Rank	Port	Country	Measure	Tons (000s)	+/- from 2004	% change from 2004
1	Shanghai	China	MT	443,000	64,038	16.90
2	Singapore	Singapore	FT	423,267	29,849	7.59
3	Rotterdam	Netherlands	MT	376,600	24,037	6.82
4	Ningbo	China	MT	272,400	46,550	20.61
5	Tianjin	China	MT	245,100	38,939	18.89
6	Guangzhou	China	MT	241,700	26,510	12.32
7	Hong Kong	China	MT	230,139	9,260	4.19
8	Busan	South Korea	RT	217,200	-2,560	-1.16
9	South Louisiana	United States	MT	192,549	-10,968	-5.39
10	Houston	United States	MT	192,023	8,604	4.69
11	Nagoya	Japan	FT	187,100	4,811	2.64
12	Qingdao	China	MT	184,300	22,650	14.01
13	Gwangyang	South Korea	RT	177,500	11,625	7.01
14	Dalian	China	MT	176,800	31,638	21.79
15	Qinhuangdao	China	MT	167,500	17,180	11.43
16	Chiba	Japan	FT	165,700	-3,554	-2.10
17	Antwerp	Belgium	MT	160,100	7,773	5.10
18	Shenzhen	China	MT	153,900	18,654	13.79
19	New York/New Jersey	United States	MT	138,014	-314	-0.23
20	Kaohsiung	Taiwan	MT	137,900	-14,568	-9.55
21	Yokohama	Japan	FT	133,300	6,340	4.99
22	Hamburg	Germany	MT	125,700	11,216	9.80
23	Incheon	South Korea	RT	123,500	10,427	9.22
24	Novorossiysk	Russia	MT	113,100	15,300	15.64
25	Port Hedland	Australia	MT	110,600	2,100	1.94
26	Dampier	Australia	MT	110,100	22,172	25.22
27	Klang	Malaysia	FT	109,700	9,789	9.80
28	Ulsan	South Korea	RT	103,500	-53,017	-33.87
29	Kitakyushu	Japan	FT	101,700	-1,545	-1.50
30	Marseille	France	MT	96,600	2,507	2.66
31	Osaka	Japan	FT	93,100	-47	-0.05
32	Tubarão	Brazil	MT	92,700	8,267	9.79
33	Port of Jebel Ali	United Arab Emirates	MT	92,500	15,120	19.54
34	Tokyo	Japan	FT	92,000	573	0.63
35	Kobe	Japan	FT	91,200	5,539	6.47
36	Richards Bay	South Africa	HT	86,600	1,646	1.94
37	Itaqui	Brazil	MT	85,900	8,942	11.62
38	Newcastle	Australia	MT	85,600	2,040	2.44
39	Hay Point	Australia	MT	81,600	-3,959	-4.63
40	Vancouver	Canada	MT	76,500	2,926	3.98
41	Huntington	United States	MT	76,104	5,924	8.44
42	Le Havre	France	MT	75,000	-1,175	-1.54
43	Amsterdam	Netherlands	MT	74,900	1,724	2.36
44	Long Beach	United States	MT	72,447	-237	-0.33
45	Santos	Brazil	MT	71,900	4,291	6.35
46	Beaumont	United States	MT	71,566	-11,677	-14.03
47	Corpus Christi, Texas	United States	MT	70,441	-1,207	-1.68
48	Gladstone	Australia	MT	67,200	4,052	6.42
49	Sepetiba	Brazil	MT	67,100		
50	Algeciras	Spain	MT	63,500	2,206	3.60

== 2004 ==
Rank	Port	Country	Measure	Tons (000s)	+/- from 2003	% change from 2003
1	Singapore	Singapore	FT	393,418	45,724	13.15
2	Shanghai	China	MT	378,962	62,752	19.85
3	Rotterdam	Netherlands	MT	352,563	25,605	7.83
4	Ningbo	China	MT	225,850	71,870	46.67
5	Hong Kong	China	MT	220,879	13,267	6.39
6	Busan	South Korea	RT	219,760	57,300	35.27
7	Guangzhou	China	MT	215,190	47,470	28.30
8	Tianjin	China	MT	206,161	44,341	27.40
9	South Louisiana	United States	MT	203,517	23,024	12.76
10	Houston	United States	MT	183,419	10,099	5.83
11	Nagoya	Japan	FT	182,289	13,911	8.26
12	Chiba	Japan	FT	169,254	254	0.15
13	Gwangyang	South Korea	RT	165,875	786	0.48
14	Qingdao	China	MT	161,650	20,750	14.73
15	Ulsan	South Korea	RT	156,517	9,577	6.52
16	Kaohsiung	Republic of China	MT	152,468	13,636	9.82
17	Antwerp	Belgium	MT	152,327	9,452	6.62
18	Qinhuangdao	China	MT	150,320	24,700	19.66
19	Dalian	China	MT	145,162	19,142	15.19
20	New York/New Jersey	United States	MT	138,328	5,890	4.45
21	Shenzhen	China	MT	135,246	47,576	54.27
22	Yokohama	Japan	FT	126,960	1,017	0.81
23	Hamburg	Germany	MT	114,484	7,948	7.46
24	Incheon	South Korea	RT	113,073	-17,945	-13.70
25	Port Hedland	Australia	MT	108,500	18,701	20.83
26	Kitakyushu	Japan	FT	103,245	14,355	16.15
27	Klang	Malaysia	FT	99,911	11,023	12.40
28	Novorossiysk	Russia	MT	97,800	12,300	14.32
29	Marseille	France	MT	94,093	-1,452	-1.52
30	Osaka	Japan	FT	93,147	3,460	3.86
31	Tokyo	Japan	FT	91,427	2,952	3.34
32	Dampier	Australia	MT	87,928	-952	-1.07
33	Kobe	Japan	FT	85,661	6,902	8.76
34	Hay Point	Australia	MT	85,559	8,013	10.33
35	Richards Bay	South Africa	HT	84,954	-2,567	-2.93
36	Tubarão	Brazil	MT	84,433	6,812	8.78
37	Newcastle	Australia	MT	83,560	848	1.03
38	Beaumont	United States	MT	83,243	3,773	4.75
39	Port of Jebel Ali	United Arab Emirates	MT	77,380	13,754	21.62
40	Itaqui	Brazil	MT	76,958	9,367	13.86
41	Le Havre	France	MT	76,175	4,682	6.55
42	Vancouver	Canada	MT	73,574	6,847	10.26
43	Amsterdam	Netherlands	MT	73,176	7,715	11.79
44	Long Beach	United States	MT	72,684	9,868	15.71
45	Corpus Christi, Texas	United States	MT	71,648	1,543	2.20
46	New Orleans	United States	MT	70,886	-5,230	-6.87
47	Huntington	United States	MT	70,180	-303	-0.43
48	Santos	Brazil	MT	67,609	7,532	12.54
49	Gladstone	Australia	MT	63,148	3,487	5.84
50	Texas City	United States	MT	61,987		

== 2003 ==
Rank	Port	Country	Measure	Tons (000s)	+/- from 2002	% change from 2002
1	Singapore	Singapore	FT	347,694	12,538	3.74
2	Rotterdam	Netherlands	MT	326,958	5,107	1.59
3	Shanghai	China	MT	316,210	77,604	32.52
4	Hong Kong	China	MT	207,612	15,102	7.84
5	South Louisiana	United States	MT	180,493	-15,952	-8.12
6	Houston	United States	MT	173,320	12,130	7.52
7	Chiba	Japan	FT	169,000	10,071	6.34
8	Nagoya	Japan	FT	168,378	10,358	6.55
9	Guangzhou	China	MT	167,720	27,325	19.46
10	Gwangyang	South Korea	RT	165,089	11,642	7.59
11	Busan	South Korea	RT	162,460	18,688	13.00
12	Tianjin	China	MT	161,820	32,820	25.44
13	Ningbo	China	MT	153,980	3,980	2.65
14	Ulsan	South Korea	RT	146,940	-1,472	-0.99
15	Antwerp	Belgium	MT	142,875	11,246	8.54
16	Qingdao	China	MT	140,900	20,900	17.42
17	Kaohsiung	Republic of China	MT	138,832	9,418	7.28
18	New York/New Jersey	United States	MT	132,438	10,335	8.46
19	Incheon	South Korea	RT	131,018	-15,163	-10.37
20	Dalian	China	MT	126,020	18,482	17.19
21	Yokohama	Japan	FT	125,943	7,871	6.67
22	Qinhuangdao	China	MT	125,620	4,468	3.69
23	Hamburg	Germany	MT	106,536	8,264	8.41
24	Marseille	France	MT	95,545	3,284	3.56
25	Port Hedland	Australia	MT	89,799	8,041	9.84
26	Osaka	Japan	FT	89,687	3,188	3.69
27	Kitakyushu	Japan	FT	88,890	4,641	5.51
28	Klang	Malaysia	FT	88,888	6,617	8.04
29	Dampier	Australia	MT	88,880	-3,348	-3.63
30	Tokyo	Japan	FT	88,475	5,530	6.67
31	Shenzhen	China	MT	87,670	11,788	15.53
32	Richards Bay	South Africa	HT	87,521	6,012	7.38
33	Novorossiysk	Russia	MT	85,500	22,209	35.09
34	Newcastle	Australia	MT	82,712	5,825	7.58
35	Beaumont	United States	MT	79,470	1,480	1.90
36	Kobe	Japan	FT	78,759	158	0.20
37	Tubarão	Brazil	MT	77,621	1,756	2.31
38	Hay Point	Australia	MT	77,546	2,874	3.85
39	New Orleans	United States	MT	76,116	-1,047	-1.36
40	Le Havre	France	MT	71,493	3,795	5.61
41	Huntington	United States	MT	70,483	-3,107	-4.22
42	Corpus Christi, Texas	United States	MT	70,105	4,743	7.26
43	Itaqui	Brazil	MT	67,591	2,649	4.08
44	Vancouver	Canada	MT	66,727	3,926	6.25
45	Amsterdam	Netherlands	MT	65,461	-4,956	-7.04
46	Port of Jebel Ali	United Arab Emirates	MT	63,626		
47	Long Beach	United States	MT	62,816	1,201	1.95
48	Santos	Brazil	MT	60,077	6,603	12.35
49	Gladstone	Australia	MT	59,661	5,195	9.54
50	Algeciras	Spain	MT	56,682		

== 2002 ==
Rank	Port	Country	Measure	Tons (000s)
1	Singapore	Singapore	MT	335,156
2	(Netherlands) Rotterdam	Netherlands	MT	321,851
3	(China) Shanghai	China	MT	238,606
4	(United States) South Louisiana	United States	MT	196,445
5	Hong Kong	China	MT	192,510
6	(United States) Houston	United States	MT	161,190
7	(Japan) Chiba	Japan	FT	158,929
8	(Japan) Nagoya	Japan	FT	158,020
9	(South Korea) Gwangyang	South Korea	RT	153,447
10	(China) Ningbo	China	MT	150,000
11	(South Korea) Ulsan	South Korea	RT	148,412
12	(South Korea) Incheon	South Korea	RT	146,181
13	(South Korea) Busan	South Korea	RT	143,772
14	(China) Guangzhou	China	MT	140,395
15	(Belgium) Antwerp	Belgium	MT	131,629
16	(Taiwan) Kaohsiung	Taiwan	MT	129,414
17	(China) Tianjin	China	MT	129,000
18	(United States) New York/New Jersey	United States	MT	122,103
19	(China) Qinhuangdao	China	MT	121,152
20	(China) Qingdao	China	MT	120,000
21	(Japan) Yokohama	Japan	FT	118,072
22	(China) Dalian	China	MT	107,538
23	(Germany) Hamburg	Germany	MT	98,272
24	(France) Marseille	France	MT	92,261
25	(Australia) Dampier	Australia	MT	92,228
26	(Japan) Osaka	Japan	FT	86,499
27	(Japan) Kitakyushu	Japan	FT	84,249
28	(Japan) Tokyo	Japan	FT	82,945
29	(Malaysia) Klang	Malaysia	FT	82,271
30	(Australia) Port Hedland	Australia	MT	81,758
31	(South Africa) Richards Bay	South Africa	MT	81,509
32	(Japan) Kobe	Japan	FT	78,601
33	(United States) Beaumont	United States	MT	77,990
34	(United States) New Orleans	United States	MT	77,163
35	(Australia) Newcastle	Australia	MT	76,887
36	(China) Shenzhen	China	MT	75,882
37	(Brazil) Tubarão	Brazil	MT	75,865
38	(Australia) Hay Point	Australia	MT	74,672
39	(United States) Huntington	United States	MT	73,590
40	(Netherlands) Amsterdam	Netherlands	MT	70,417
41	(France) Le Havre	France	MT	67,698
42	(United States) Corpus Christi	United States	MT	65,362
43	(Brazil) Itaqui	Brazil	MT	64,942
44	(Russia) Novorossiysk	Russia	MT	63,291
45	(Canada) Vancouver	Canada	MT	62,801
46	(United States) Long Beach	United States	MT	61,615
47	(United States) Baton Rouge	United States	MT	54,997
48	(Australia) Gladstone	Australia	MT	54,466
49	(United States) Plaquemines	United States	MT	53,661
50	(Brazil) Santos	Brazil	MT	53,474

== References and notes ==
- AAPA World Port Rankings 2003
- AAPA World Port Rankings 2002
