= List of ports in China =

China has 34 major ports and more than 2000 minor ports. The former are mostly sea ports (except for ports such as Shanghai, Nanjing and Jiujiang along the Yangtze and Guangzhou in the Pearl River delta) opening up to the Yellow Sea (Bo Hai), Taiwan Strait, Pearl River and South China Sea while the latter comprise ports that lie along the major and minor rivers of China. Most of China's major cities are also ports or are facilitated by a port nearby.

== Port construction and cargoes ==
China's coastal ports enable the transportation of coal, containers, imported iron ore, and grain; roll-on-roll-off operations between mainland and islands; and deep-water access to the sea.

In port construction, China has especially strengthened the container transport system, concentrating on the construction of a group of deep-water container wharves at Dalian, Tianjin, Qingdao, Shanghai, Ningbo, Xiamen and Shenzhen, and thus laying the foundations for China's container hubs. A new deep-water port has opened in Yangshan southeast of Shanghai.

The coal transportation system has been further strengthened with the construction of a number of coal transport wharves. In addition, wharves handling crude oil and iron ore imports have been reconstructed or expanded.

At the end of 2004, China's coastal ports had over 2,500 berths of medium size or above, of which 650 were 10,000-ton-class berths; their handling capacity was 61.5 million standard containers for the year, ranking first in the world. Freight volumes handled by some large ports exceed 100 million tons a year; and the Shanghai, Shenzhen, Qingdao, Tianjin, Guangzhou, Xiamen, Ningbo and Dalian have been listed among the world's top 50 container ports..

130 of China's 2,000 ports are open to foreign ships. The major ports, including river ports accessible by ocean-going ships, are Beihai, Dalian, Dandong, Fuzhou, Guangzhou, Haikou, Hankou, Huangpu, Jiujiang, Lianyungang, Nanjing, Nantong, Ningbo, Qingdao, Qinhuangdao, Rizhao, Sanya, Shanghai, Shantou, Shenzhen, Tianjin, Weihai, Wenzhou, Xiamen, Yangzhou, Yantai, and Zhanjiang.

== Mainland ==
=== Jiangxi ===
- Port of Jiujiang

=== Fujian ===
- Port of Fuzhou
- Port of Quanzhou
- Port of Xiamen

=== Guangdong ===
- Port of Guangzhou
- Port of Shenzhen
- Port of Shantou
- Port of Zhanjiang
- Shunde Port
- Rongqi Port
- Gaolan Port

=== Hainan ===
- Haikou New Port
- Haikou Port New Seaport
- Haikou Xiuying Port
- Macun Port
- Port of Yangpu
- South Port

=== Hebei ===
- Caofeidian
- Qinhuangdao Port

=== Jiangsu ===
- Port of Suzhou
- Changshu Xinghua Port
- Port of LianYunGang

=== Liaoning ===
- Port of Dalian
- Port of Jinzhou
- Port of Yingkou

=== Shandong ===
- Port of Weihai
- Port of Yantai
- Qingdao Port
- Qingdao Qianwan Container Terminal

=== Shanghai ===
- Port of Shanghai
- Yangshan Port

=== Tianjin ===
- Port of Tianjin

=== Zhejiang ===
- Port of Ningbo-Zhoushan

== Special administrative regions ==
=== Hong Kong ===
- Port of Hong Kong
  - Holt's Wharf
  - Kwai Chung Container Terminals
    - Hongkong International Terminals Ltd.
    - Modern Terminals Limited
    - Terminal 9
  - River Trade Terminal

=== Macau ===
- Kai Ho Port
- Macau Container Port

== See also ==
- List of East Asian ports
- Container industry in China
