= Hutchison Port Holdings =

Subsidiary of CK Huschison Holding's

Hutchison Port Holdings Limited
- Trade name: Hutchison Ports
- Type: Subsidiary
- Industry: Transport, Logistics
- Founder: John Duflon Hutchison
- Headquarters: Hong Kong
- Area served: Worldwide
- Key people: Eric Ip (Group Managing Director); Sin Ling Tsim (CFO)
- Products: Port operations
- Services: Port operations
- Owner: CK Hutchison Holdings (80%); PSA International (20%)

Chinese name
- Traditional Chinese: 和記港口集團有限公司
- Simplified Chinese: 和记港口集团有限公司
Transcriptions
Standard Mandarin
- Hanyu Pinyin: Héjì gǎngkǒu jítuán yǒuxiàn gōngsī
Yue: Cantonese
- Jyutping: Wo^{4}gei^{3} gong^{2}hau^{2} zaap^{6}tyun^{4} jau^{5}haan^{6} gung^{1}si^{1}
- Website: www.hph.com

Hutchison Port Holdings Limited (HPH; Chinese: 和記港口集團有限公司), trading as Hutchison Ports (Chinese: 和記港口), is a private holding company incorporated in the British Virgin Islands. The port operator group is a subsidiary of CK Hutchison Holdings (formerly Hutchison Whampoa). Some operation of the company were listed as Hutchison Port Holdings Trust in Singapore Exchange.

In 2016, the network comprised 48 port operations throughout Asia, the Middle East, Africa, Europe, the Americas and Australasia.

== History ==
In 2005, HPH was the largest port operator in the world, with a 33.2 million TEU throughput, and 8.3% world market share.

In April 2006, Hutchison Whampoa sold a 20% share of Hutchison Port Holdings Limited to PSA International for $US4.4 billion, retaining ownership of the remaining 80%.

In 2011, some of the assets was spin-off as a listed company as Hutchison Port Holdings Trust; the listed company was incorporated as a business trust under Singapore's Business Trusts Act.

In September 2016, HPH rebranded its network as Hutchison Ports.

In December 2016, the Chornomorsk commercial seaport in western Ukraine, signed a cooperation agreement with Hutchison Ports. Among the agreed upon points are the company's entry into the port as a terminal operator as of 2017. Hutchison will provide expert consultative services to reform and improve Ukraine's port industry.

In January 2025, the government of Panama commenced an audit of a local HPH subsidiary and a review of a 2021 concession contract for port operations on the Panama Canal that had been criticized for lacking transparency and generating limited benefits for Panama's economy. In February 2025, a lawsuit was filed in Panama's Supreme Court of Justice seeking to cancel HPH's port operations contract at the Panama Canal.

In March 2025, it was reported that CK Hutchinson Holding would sell HPH and Hutchinson Port Group Holdings. There were reports stating that the proposed key buyer was the Aponte Italian shipping family, with BlackRock being a consortium partner in the port deal. Diego Aponte is the group president of Mediterranean Shipping Company (MSC), and chairman of the Terminal Investment Limited (TiL). According to The New York Times, the Li family felt it was "under political pressure to exit the ports business"; discussions with BlackRock about the Panama Canal had begun only a few weeks prior, coinciding with the beginning of the Trump administration. The proposed sale would not include any interest in Hutchison Ports Holdings Trust, which operates ports in Hong Kong and mainland China. On 28 March 2025, according to unnamed sources cited by Sing Tao Daily and the South China Morning Post, the deal will not be signed at the expected date after China's market regulator said it will carry out an antitrust review on the deal, but the source added that does not mean the deal has been called off, and April 2 is not a definitive deadline. Chinese state media outlet China Central Television (CCTV) said the deal was "tantamount to handing a knife to an opponent." In May 2025, the state-owned newspaper Ta Kung Pao has condemned the company for ignoring warnings from the central government. The paper accused CK Hutchison of being willfully ignorant and warned the company against the proposed sale.

In July 2025, Panama's government filed two lawsuits against CK Hutchinson's local subsidiary in the country's Supreme Court. In January 2026, the Supreme Court responded by declaring the underlying contracts unconstitutional and void, beginning a transitional period where the key terminals would be managed by APM Terminals Panama, a subsidiary of Maersk.

== Associate company ==
=== Hutchison Port Holdings Trust ===
Hutchison Port Holdings Trust is a listed trust in Singapore Exchange. Hutchison Whampoa only owned 25% stake, but had the rights to influence the trust by controlling the key stake of changing the trustee they nominated before the initial public offering.

In December 2016 The Trust's subsidiaries Yantian International Container Terminals (Phase III) Limited and Shenzhen Pingyan Multimodal Company Limited, jointly purchased 80% shares of Huizhou International Container Terminals (HICT) from Hutchison Port Holdings for US$86.26 million.

In January, 2017 HPH Trust signed a strategic agreement to manage the operations at five terminals, including 16 berths in Kwai Tsing in Hong Kong.

== Port assets ==
City	Country	Port (Terminal)	Ownership
Ajman	United Arab Emirates	Port of Ajman (Ajman International Terminals)	
Alexandria	Egypt	Alexandria Port (Alexandria International Container Terminal)	50%
Amsterdam	Netherlands	Port of Amsterdam (Amsterdam Container Terminal)	100%
Antwerp	Belgium	Port of Antwerp (TMA Antwerp)	50%
Barcelona	Spain	Port of Barcelona (Barcelona Europe South Terminal)	100%
Bà Rịa	Vietnam	Saigon International Terminals Vietnam	
Basra	Iraq	Port of Basra	
Brisbane	Australia	Port of Brisbane (Berths 11 & 12)	100%
Busan	South Korea	Port of Busan (Hutchison Busan Container Terminal)	
Busan	South Korea	Port of Busan (Hutchison Gamman Container Terminal)	
Duisburg	Germany	Port of Duisburg (Duisburger Container Terminal)	100%
Dekhela	Egypt	EI Dekheila Port	50%
Felixstowe	United Kingdom	Port of Felixstowe	100%
Foshan	China	Port of Nanhai (Nanhai International Container Terminals)	
Freeport	Bahamas	Freeport Container Port	51%
Gdynia	Poland	Port of Gdynia (Gdynia Container Terminal)	100%
Greater London	United Kingdom	London Thamesport	80%
Gwangyang	South Korea	Port of Gwangyang (Hutchison Kwangyang Container Terminal)	
Gwangyang	South Korea	Port of Gwangyang (Port Phase II)	89%
Harwich	United Kingdom	Harwich International Port	100%
Huizhou	China	Port of Huizhou (HICT Terminal)	
Hong Kong (Kwai Tsing District)	China	Port of Hong Kong (Kwai Tsing Container Terminals (CT4, CT6, CT7, CT9N))	66.5%
Hong Kong (Kwai Tsing District)	China	Port of Hong Kong (Kwai Tsing Container Terminals (CT8))	2nd largest (33.3%) after COSCO Shipping Ports
Hong Kong (Tuen Mun District)	China	Port of Hong Kong (River Trade Terminal)	50%
Jakarta	Indonesia	Port of Tanjung Priok (Jakarta International Container Terminal)	51%
Jakarta	Indonesia	Port of Tanjung Priok (Terminal Petikemas Koja	
Jazan	Saudi Arabia	Port of Jazan	100%
Jiangmen	China	Jiangmen Port (Jiangmen Terminal)	
Karachi	Pakistan	Port of Karachi (Karachi International Container Terminal)	
Huizhou	China	Port of Huizhou	
Karachi	Pakistan	Port of Karachi (South Asia Pakistan Terminal)	
Laem Chabang	Thailand	Laem Chabang Port	
Lazaro Cardenas	Mexico	Port of Lázaro Cárdenas (Lázaro Cardenas Terminal)	
Manzanillo	Mexico	Port of Manzanillo (Terminal Internacional de Manzanillo)	
Moerdijk	Netherlands	Port of Moerdijk (Moerdijk Container Terminals)	
Ningbo	China	Port of Ningbo-Zhoushan (Ningbo Beilun International Container Terminals)	
Port Klang	Malaysia	Port Klang (Westport)	30%
Ras Al Khaimah	United Arab Emirates	Ras Al Khaimah Port (International Container Terminal)	
Rotterdam	Netherlands	Port of Rotterdam (ECT Euromax)	45%
Rotterdam	Netherlands	Port of Rotterdam (ECT Delta)	89.37%
Rotterdam	Netherlands	Port of Rotterdam (ECT Delta 2)	60.78%
Shanghai	China	Port of Shanghai (Shanghai Mingdong Container Terminals)	
Shanghai	China	Port of Shanghai (Shanghai Pudong International Container Terminals)	
Shenzhen	China	Port of Yantian (Yantian International Container Terminals)	
Sohar	Oman	Sohar Port (Sohar Port Container Terminal)	
Stockholm	Sweden	Port of Stockholm (Hutchison Ports Stockholm)	100%
Sydney	Australia	Port Botany (Terminal 3)	100%
Taranto	Italy	Port of Taranto (Taranto Container Terminal)	50%
Venlo	Netherlands	Port of Venlo	
Veracruz	Mexico	Port of Veracruz (ICAVE)	
Yangon	Myanmar	Thilawa Port (Myanmar International Terminal)	
Xiamen	China	Port of Xiamen (Xiamen International Container Terminals)	
