= Bohai Sea =

Inland sea in Eastern China

Coordinates: 38.7°N 119.9°E

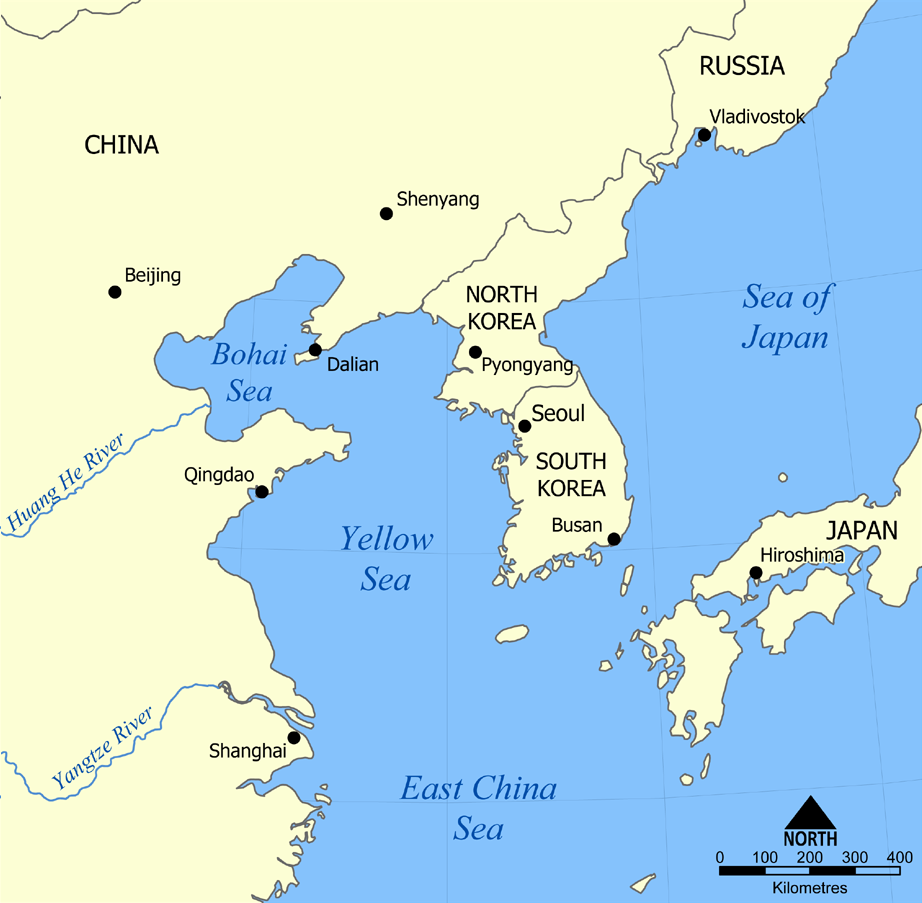
- Chinese: 渤海
Transcriptions
Standard Mandarin
- Hanyu Pinyin: Bó Hǎi
- Bopomofo: ㄅㄛˊ ㄏㄞˇ
- Wade–Giles: Po^{2} hai^{3}
- IPA: [pwǒ.xàɪ]
Wu
- Romanization: Poh^{平} hae^{平}
Yue: Cantonese
- Yale Romanization: Buht hói
- Jyutping: But^{6} hoi^{2}
Southern Min
- Tâi-lô: Phu̍t hái

The Bohai Sea (Chinese: 渤海; pinyin: Bó Hǎi; Zhuyin Fuhao: ㄅㄛˊ ㄏㄞˇ; lit. 'Bo Sea') is a gulf/inland sea approximately 77,000 km^{2} (30,000 sq mi) in area on the east coast of Mainland China. It is the northwestern and innermost extension of the Yellow Sea, to which it connects via the Bohai Strait. It has a mean depth of approximately 18 meters (59 ft), with a maximum depth of about 80 meters (260 ft) located in the northern part of the Bohai Strait.

The Bohai Sea is enclosed by three provinces and one direct-administered municipality from three different regions of China—Liaoning Province (of Northeast China), Hebei Province and Tianjin Municipality (of North China), and Shandong Province (of East China). It is the center of the Bohai Economic Rim, and its proximity to the Chinese capital of Beijing and the municipality of Tianjin makes it one of the busiest seaways in the world. The entrance to the Bohai Sea is considered a part of the territorial sea of the People's Republic of China due to the presence of the Miaodao islands. China declared the Bohai sea to be part of its inland waters in 1958.

== History ==
=== Ancient times ===
During the Pleistocene, the Bohai Sea experienced numerous glacioeustatic transgressions and regressions, as evidenced by sediment cores sampled from the seafloor showing fluvial floodplain conditions during intervals of low sea level.

=== Imperial era ===
Throughout imperial Chinese history, the Bohai Sea held both strategic and economic importance. During the Tang Dynasty, it was a vital maritime link to the Bohai Kingdom (698–926)—an early medieval Mohe-Korean state in what is now northeast China and parts of the Korean Peninsula. Trade and diplomatic missions between China, Korea, and Japan often passed through the Bohai Sea, making it part of the broader East Asian maritime network. During the Liao (907–1125) and Jin (1115–1234) dynasties, which were established by the Khitan and Jurchen peoples respectively, control over the Bohai region was central to their northern dominance. These dynasties maintained fleets and fortified ports along the coast.

In the Yuan Dynasty (1271–1368), the Bohai Sea gained greater attention as maritime commerce expanded under a more unified empire. Naval bases were established along the coast, and shipping routes were actively developed to support both military logistics and trade. The Ming (1368–1644) and Qing (1644–1912) dynasties continued to use the Bohai region for maritime patrols and defense, especially as threats from Japanese pirates (wokou) increased during the Ming era. At the same time, regional ports such as Yingkou and Dagu became important for domestic salt, grain, and fish trade.

=== 19th and 20th centuries ===
Until the early 20th century, Bo Hai was often called the Gulf of Zhili (Chinese: 直隸海灣; pinyin: Zhílì Hǎiwān) or Gulf of Beizhili (北直隸海灣; Běizhílì Hǎiwān). The romanization systems widely used in the West at the time rendered these names as variations of "Jili", "Chihli", "Pechele", "Pechihli", "Pechili "or "Pe-Chihli". Zhili and North Zhili were historic provinces in an area surrounding Beijing that approximately corresponds to what is now Hebei Province.

In the last decade of 19th century, Bohai Gulf became the major stage of military conflicts. In 1894-95, the First Sino-Japanese War broke out, and it featured critical naval engagements in and around the Bohai Sea. One of the most decisive battles was the Battle of the Yalu River in 1894, fought just outside the Bohai Sea's eastern approaches, where the Qing navy's Beiyang Fleet suffered a major defeat. This loss opened the path for Japanese forces to project power deeper into the Bohai region. Subsequently, in early 1895, Japanese troops invaded the Shandong Peninsula and captured Weihaiwei, a heavily fortified naval base at the eastern mouth of the Bohai Sea. The fall of Weihaiwei marked the collapse of Qing maritime defense and helped force China to sign the humiliating Treaty of Shimonoseki, in which it ceded Taiwan and recognized Korea's independence.

Several years later, during the Boxer Rebellion (1899–1901), the Bohai Sea again became strategically important. As the anti-foreign Boxer uprising spread across northern China and reached Beijing, the port city of Tianjin, located at the western edge of the Bohai Sea, became a focal point for foreign military intervention. In June 1900, an international alliance of eight powers launched an amphibious landing at the Dagu Forts, which guarded the mouth of the Hai River and access to Tianjin and Beijing. After a fierce bombardment and ground assault, the Dagu Forts fell to the alliance forces. This opened the way for allied troops to advance inland through Tianjin and eventually reach and occupy Beijing, forcing the Qing court to flee and leading to the signing of the Boxer Protocol in 1901.

== Geography ==
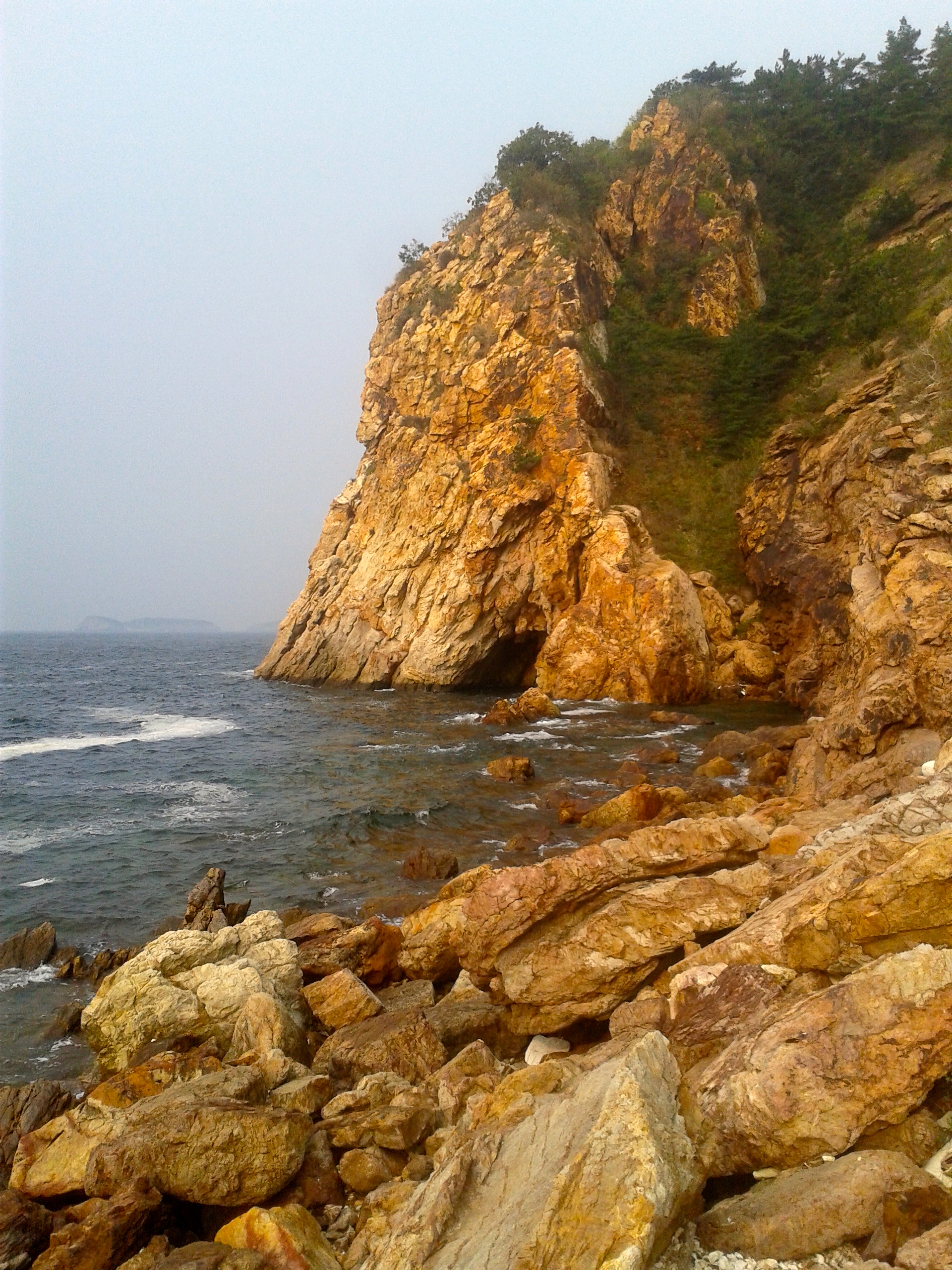
Rocky shore in Dalian, Liaoning

There are three major bays inside the Bohai Gulf: Laizhou Bay to the south, Bohai Bay to the west, and Liaodong Bay to the north. The provincial-level administrative divisions that have a coastline to the Bohai Sea are, from the south going clockwise: Shandong, Hebei, Tianjin (Tientsin), Hebei again, and Liaoning. Some of the major rivers draining into the gulf include the Yellow River, Xiaoqing River, Hai River, Luan River, Dai River, Daling River, Xiaoling River, Liao River and Daliao River. There are a few important oil reserves in the vicinity of the gulf, including the Shengli Field. Important islands or island groups in the gulf include the Changshan Archipelago, Juehua Island (觉华岛; 覺華島), Bijia Mountain, Changxing Island, Xizhong Island, the East/West Mayi Islands (蚂蚁岛), Zhu Island (猪岛; 豬島) and She Island (蛇岛; 蛇島).

=== Bohai Strait ===
The opening of the Bohai Sea is bounded by the Changshan Archipelago between Dalian's Lüshunkou District on the southern tip of Liaodong Peninsula, and the Cape of Penglai on the northernmost protrusion of Shandong Peninsula. Due to its proximity to the capital city Beijing and the population of its surrounding provinces exceeding 210 million, the exit of the Bohai Gulf to the Yellow Sea, the Bohai Strait (渤海海峡; 渤海海峽), has become one of busiest sea routes in recent times. Due to the Changshan Island Chain traversing the southern half of the strait, the strait is subdivided into several channels:

(from north to south, the most commonly used ones in bold)

- **Laotieshan Channel** (老铁山水道), also known as the **Lau-ti-shan Channel**, is the widest and deepest
- Daqin Channel (大钦水道)
- Xiaoqin Channel (小钦水道)
- North Tuoji Channel (北砣矶水道)
- South Tuoji Channel (南砣矶水道)
- **Changshan Channel** (长山水道), is the most direct route to Tianjin
- **Dengzhou Channel** (登州水道), also known as the **Miaodao Channel** (庙岛水道) or **Miaodao Strait** (庙岛海峡), is the nearest to the shore but also the shallowest

== Major ports ==
China MSA's Seaways Plan for the Bohai Sea. Planned routes follow closely the seaways currently in use

There are five major ports along the Bohai Sea rim, with throughputs over 100 million tons, though the port of Tangshan is further subdivided into Jingtang and Caofeidian:

- Port of Yingkou (营口港; 營口港)
- Qinhuangdao Port (秦皇岛; 秦皇島港)
- Port of Jingtang (京唐港)
- Port of Tangshan (唐山港)
- Port of Tangshan Caofeidian (曹妃甸港)
- Tianjin Port (天津港)
- Port of Huanghua (黄骅港; 黃驊港)

Caofeidian and Jingtang are usually treated as one port for statistical purposes. The ports of Dalian and Yantai are also traditionally considered part of the Bohai rim, even though strictly speaking they lie outside the limits of the sea. The Port of Longkou reached 70 million tons of cargo in 2013, and is expected to reach the 100 million ton landmark in the near future.

== Major cities along the Bohai Sea coast ==
- Liaoning
  - Dalian
  - Yingkou
  - Panjin
  - Jinzhou
  - Huludao
- Hebei
  - Qinhuangdao
  - Tangshan
  - Cangzhou
- Tianjin
- Shandong
  - Yantai
    - Zhifu
    - Penglai
    - Longkou
    - Zhaoyuan
    - Laizhou
    - Muping
    - Fushan
  - Weifang
    - Hanting
  - Dongying
    - Kenli
  - Binzhou
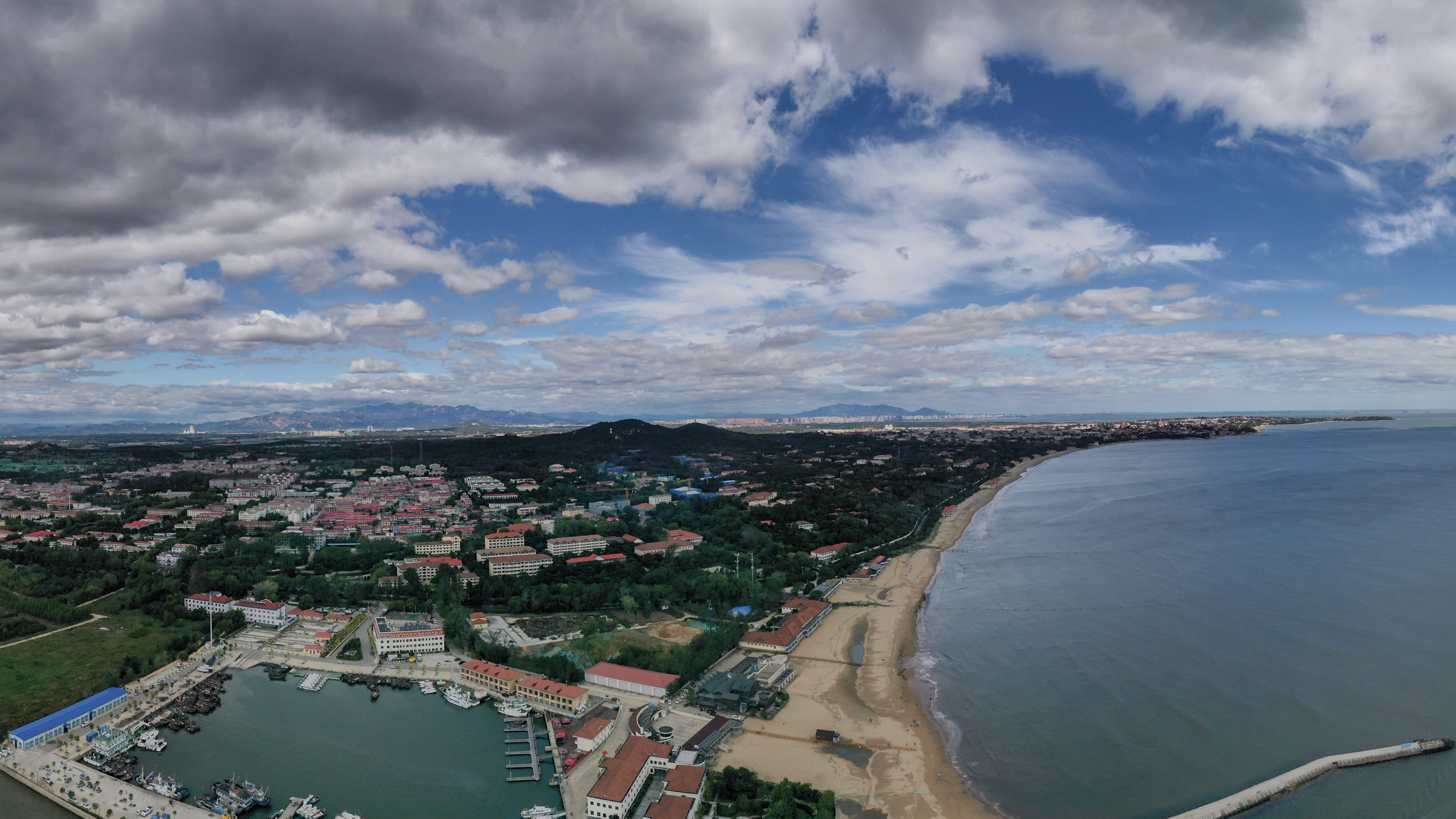
Beidaihe, Qinhuangdao

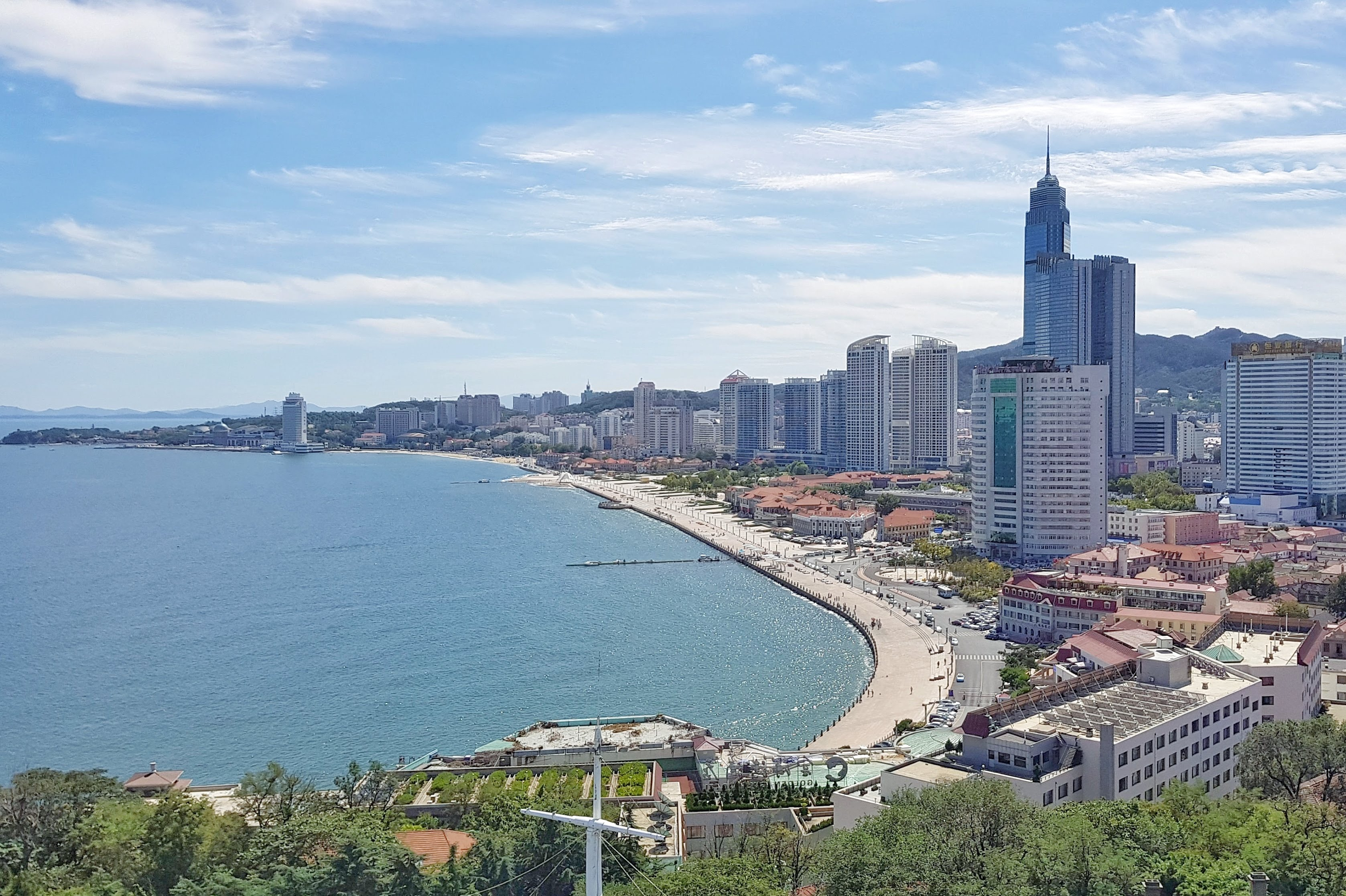
Zhifu, Yantai

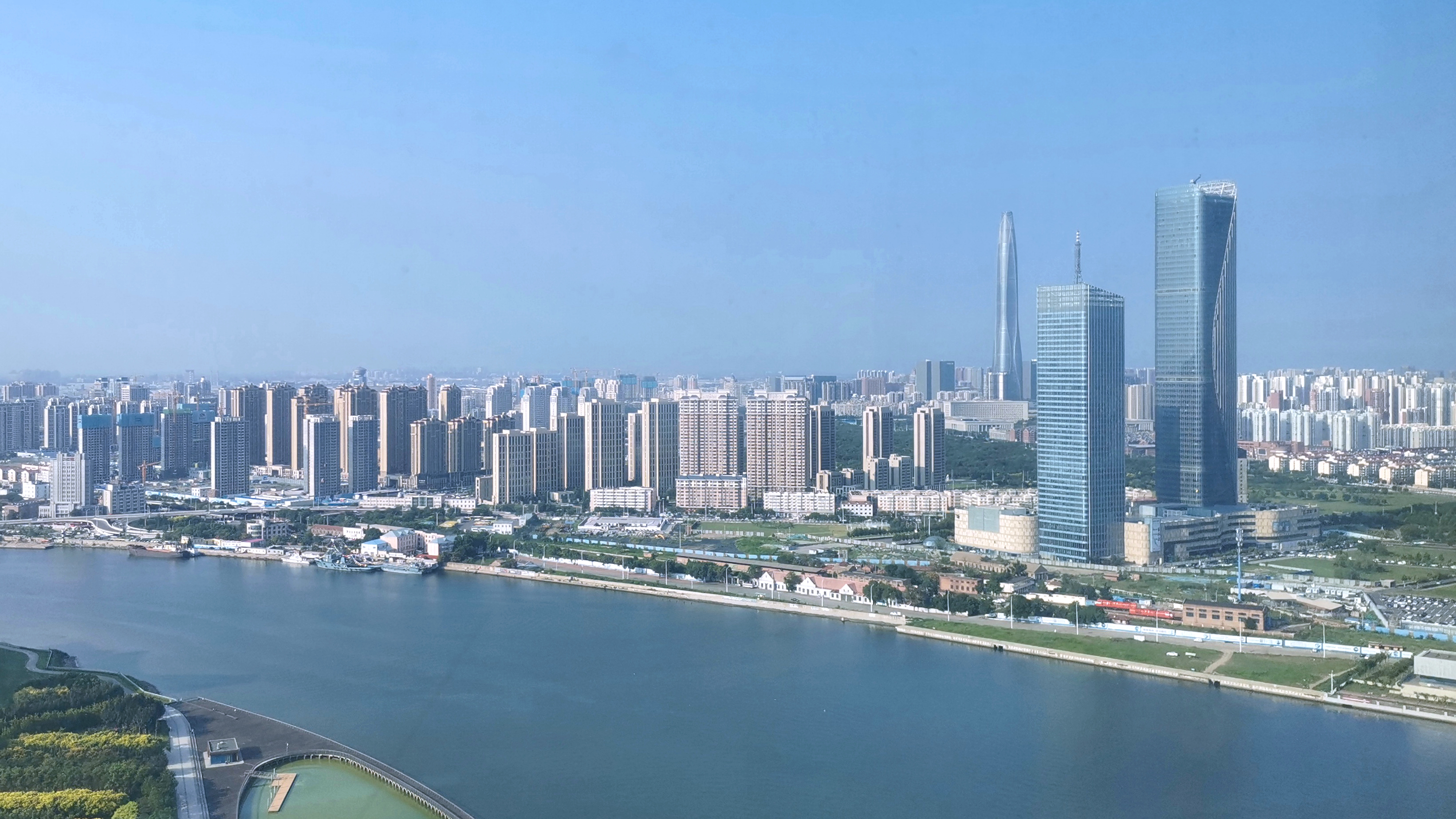
Binhai, Tianjin

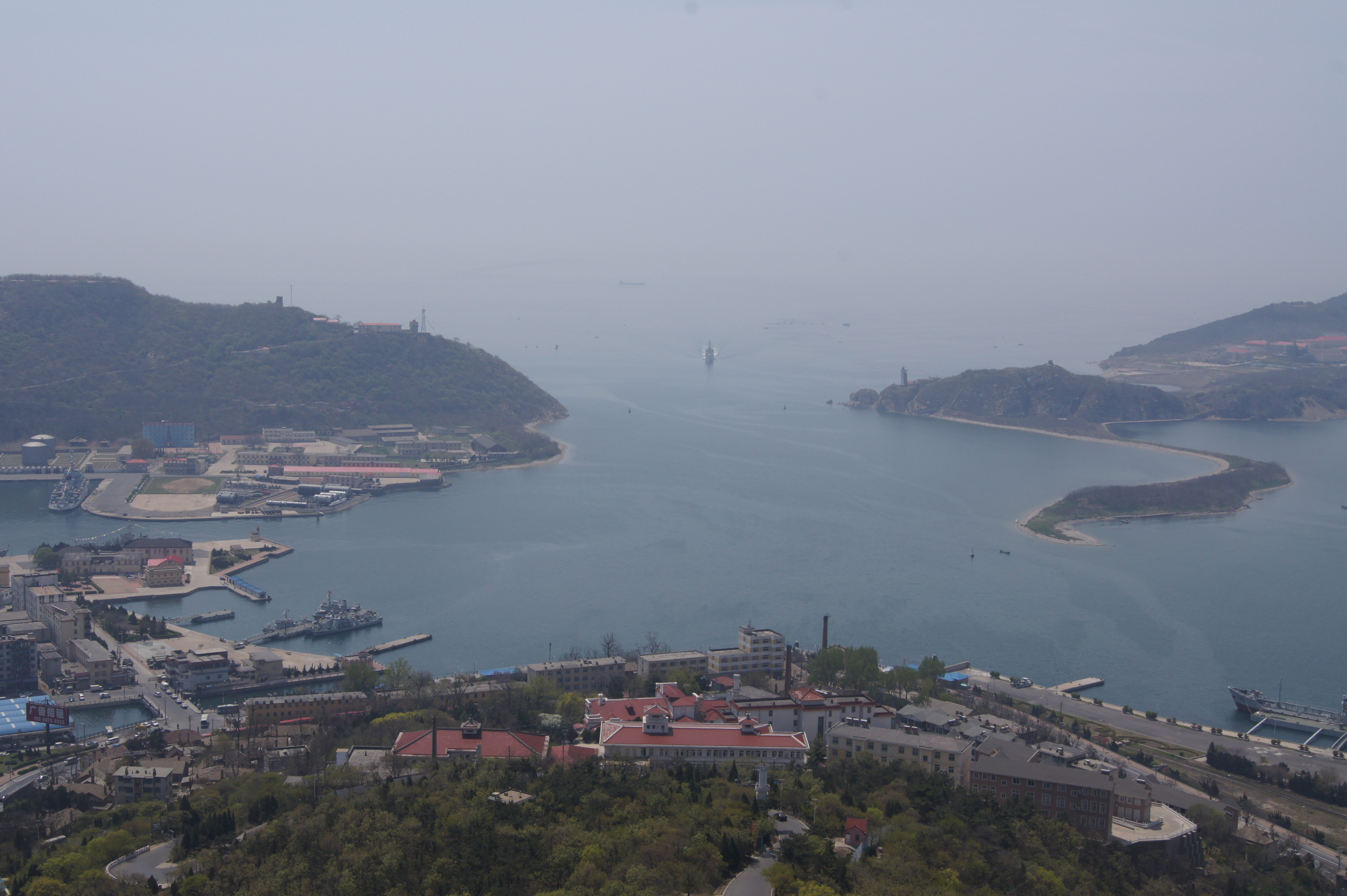
Lüshun, Dalian

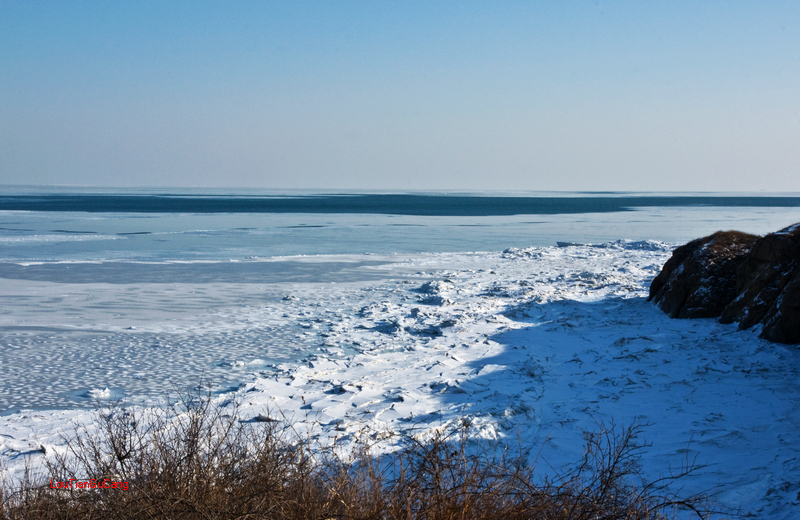
Xingcheng, Huludao

== Hydrocarbon resources ==
The Bohai Bay contains significant oil and gas reserves, which provide much of China's offshore production. The main field in the region, named Shengli, has been exploited since the 1960s. It still produces about half a million barrels a day, but is declining. Production is dominated by Chinese majors (China National Offshore Oil Corporation (CNOOC) was mostly created for this region), but foreign companies, including ConocoPhillips and Roc Oil Company, are present. The Gudao Field, located in the Zhanhua sedimentary basin, was discovered in 1968, based on gravity, magnetic and seismic surveys conducted between 1963 and 1964. The reservoir includes the Guantao (Miocene) and Minghuazhen (Pliocene) geologic formations within the dome-like anticline. The Suizhong 36-1 Oil Field was discovered in 1987, and produces from Oligocene fluvial-deltaic and lacustrine sandstones. Oil spills have been reported frequently in this region: three spills occurred in a two-month timeframe in 2011. In 2024, CNOOC discovered a 100 million ton oilfield in Bohai Sea.

== Tunnel crossing ==
In February 2011, China announced that it would build a road and rail tunnel across the Bohai Strait to connect the Liaodong and Shandong peninsulas. When completed, the tunnel would be 106 kilometers (66 mi) long, making it twice as long as the channel tunnel connecting England and France. In July 2013, a modified plan was announced, involving a 123-kilometer (76 mi)-long tunnel between Dalian, Liaoning and Yantai, Shandong. The tunnel was first proposed by officials in Yantai in 1992, but a clear plan remained elusive. In 2019, construction had still not started, and the proposed cost had reached 300 billion yuan ($43 billion USD).

== See also ==
- Balhae
- Bohai Commandery
- Bohai Economic Rim
- Eight Immortals
