= Bohai Bay =

Part of gulf of the Yellow Sea, in northeast China

Coordinates: 39°5′2.6″N 118°49′5.9″E

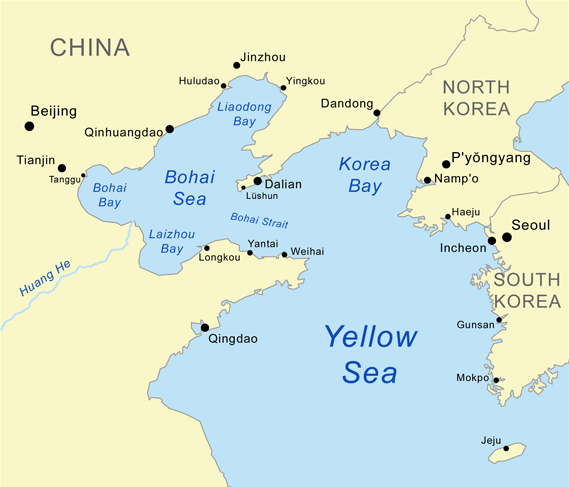
Map of Bohai Bay

Bohai Bay (simplified Chinese: 渤海湾; traditional Chinese: 渤海灣; pinyin: Bóhǎi Wān) is one of the three major bays of the Bohai Sea, the northwestern and innermost gulf of the Yellow Sea. It is bounded by the coastlines of eastern Hebei province (Tangshan and Cangzhou), Tianjin municipality and northern Shandong province (Binzhou and Dongying) south of the Daqing River estuary (which is an old mouth of Luan River in Laoting County) and north of the Yellow River estuary. It is the most southerly water in the Northern Hemisphere where sea ice can form.

The Bohai Bay is the drainage destination of the Hai River and 15 other rivers. Due to these rivers' muddy runoff, the bay used to be a highly silty water body, but extensive damming of the various river systems has greatly diminished siltage. Nevertheless, the Bohai Bay in effect concentrates the runoff of the whole eastern North China Plain, and the Bay is an intensely polluted body of water. Reduced silt deposition and sea level rise are causing problems with sea encroachment in some coastal areas.

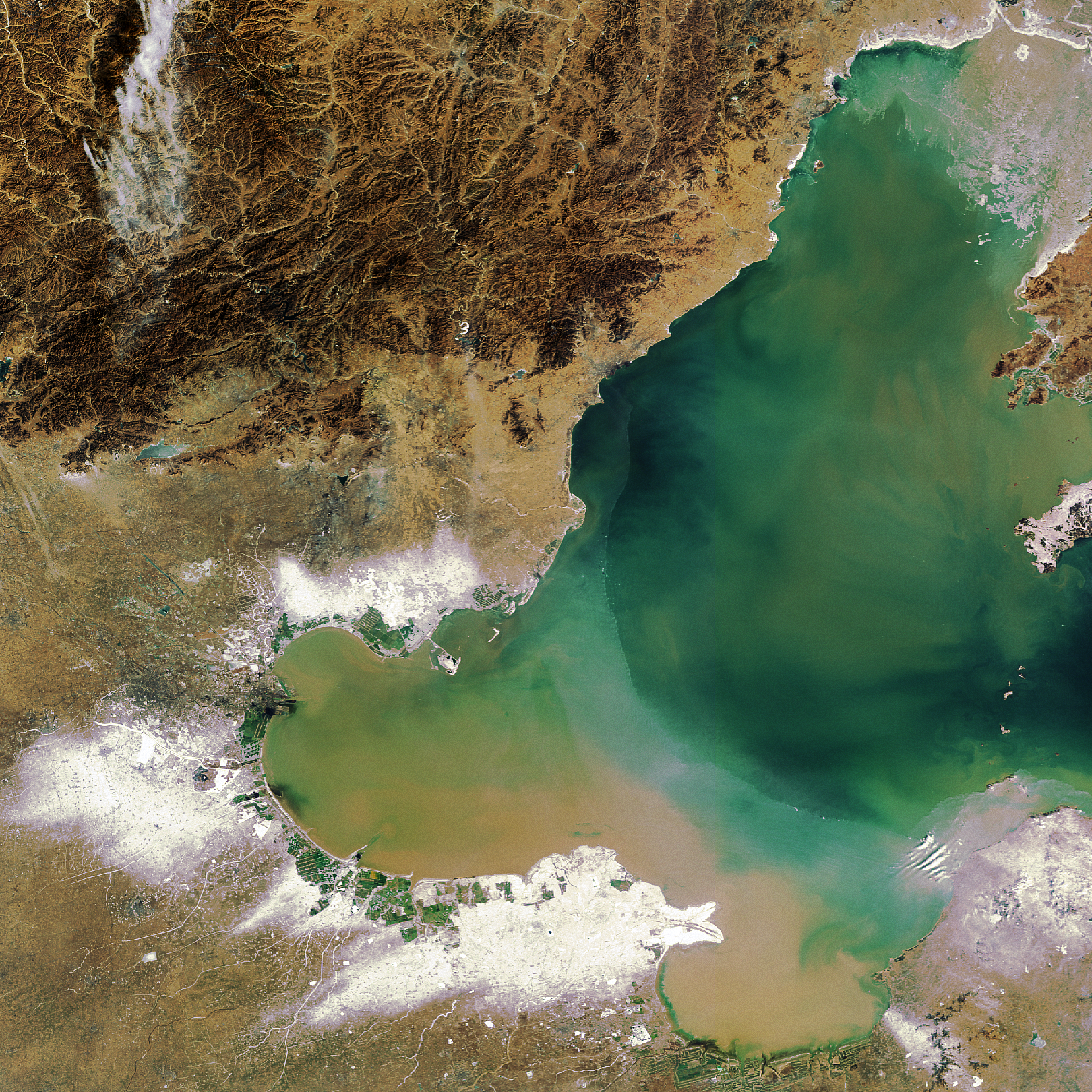
Aerial view

Fisheries were traditionally some of the richest in China, fed by enormous sediment runoff and extensive shallows to serve as hatcheries. Pollution, eutrophication, habitat destruction caused by land reclamation, and intense overfishing have resulted in a collapse of stocks, and a decline of trawl catch per unit of effort (CPUE) from 138.8 kg/net.hr to 11.2 kg/net.hr from 1959 to 1998.

The Bohai Bay is ringed by several major ports: the Port of Tianjin, the large Port of Tangshan itself which consists of three ports (Caofeidian, Jingtang and Fennan), and the Port of Huanghua, making the Bay into a very crowded waterway. Land reclamation in Tianjin and in Caofeidian have greatly changed the littoral zone, and destroyed much of the area's wetlands. Land reclamation has also affected migratory birds.

As is the case of most of the Bohai Sea, the Bohai Bay is rich in hydrocarbon deposits and has several active offshore oil fields. Jidong Nanpu contains 7,500,000,000 barrels (1.19×10^{9} m^{3}), while the bay as a whole is estimated to contain 146 billion barrels (23.2×10^{9} m^{3}). On June 4, 2011, a large oil spill occurred related to the China National Offshore Oil Corporation.

== Climate ==
Climate data for Bohai Bay (Bohai Platform A Station), elevation 30 m (98 ft), (1991–2020 normals)
Month	Jan	Feb	Mar	Apr	May	Jun	Jul	Aug	Sep	Oct	Nov	Dec	Year
Mean daily maximum °C (°F)	1.9 (35.4)	4.1 (39.4)	9.7 (49.5)	16.6 (61.9)	22.3 (72.1)	26.0 (78.8)	28.4 (83.1)	28.6 (83.5)	25.4 (77.7)	19.0 (66.2)	11.1 (52.0)	4.4 (39.9)	16.5 (61.6)
Daily mean °C (°F)	−0.7 (30.7)	0.7 (33.3)	5.4 (41.7)	11.7 (53.1)	17.8 (64.0)	22.2 (72.0)	25.5 (77.9)	26.1 (79.0)	22.9 (73.2)	16.5 (61.7)	8.6 (47.5)	2.0 (35.6)	13.2 (55.8)
Mean daily minimum °C (°F)	−2.4 (27.7)	−1.3 (29.7)	2.8 (37.0)	8.4 (47.1)	14.6 (58.3)	19.6 (67.3)	23.5 (74.3)	24.4 (75.9)	21.1 (70.0)	14.8 (58.6)	6.8 (44.2)	0.3 (32.5)	11.0 (51.9)
Average precipitation mm (inches)	1.1 (0.04)	2.2 (0.09)	3.0 (0.12)	11.1 (0.44)	24.9 (0.98)	55.5 (2.19)	99.0 (3.90)	82.1 (3.23)	22.1 (0.87)	15.4 (0.61)	8.0 (0.31)	1.4 (0.06)	325.8 (12.84)
Average precipitation days (≥ 0.1 mm)	1.4	1.9	2.5	4.6	5.7	7.1	9.5	8.0	5.0	3.9	2.7	1.5	53.8
Average snowy days	2.6	2.6	0.9	0.1	0	0	0	0	0	0	0.7	2.0	8.9
Average relative humidity (%)	59	62	61	63	67	75	82	77	64	58	57	56	65
Source: China Meteorological Administration

== See also ==
- Bohai Sea
  - Bohai Strait
