= Port of Jiangyin =

Coordinates: 31°55′5″N 120°14′5″E

Port of Jiangyin 江陰港

Location
- Country: People's Republic of China
- Location: Jiangyin, Jiangsu

Details
- Opened: 1992 (As First-class customs port)
- Type of harbour: Natural Inland Port

Statistics
- Annual cargo tonnage: 370 million (2023)
- Website www.jyport.com.cn

The Port of Jiangyin (simplified Chinese: 江阴港; traditional Chinese: 江陰港; pinyin: Jiāngyīn Gǎng) is a natural inland port located at Jiangyin, Jiangsu, People's Republic of China. It extends over 35 kilometres (22 mi) of the southern shore of the Yangtze river. The port had a container throughput of 1,001,000 TEU in 2013.

== Setting ==
The Port of Jiangyin is located in the plain between the Yangtze River and the Lake Tai.

== Layout ==
The Port has 7 deep-water berths, capable of handling ships of up to 100,000 DWT. The channel depth is 15 metres (49 ft) and the land area is of 104 hectares (260 acres).
