= Port of Beaumont =

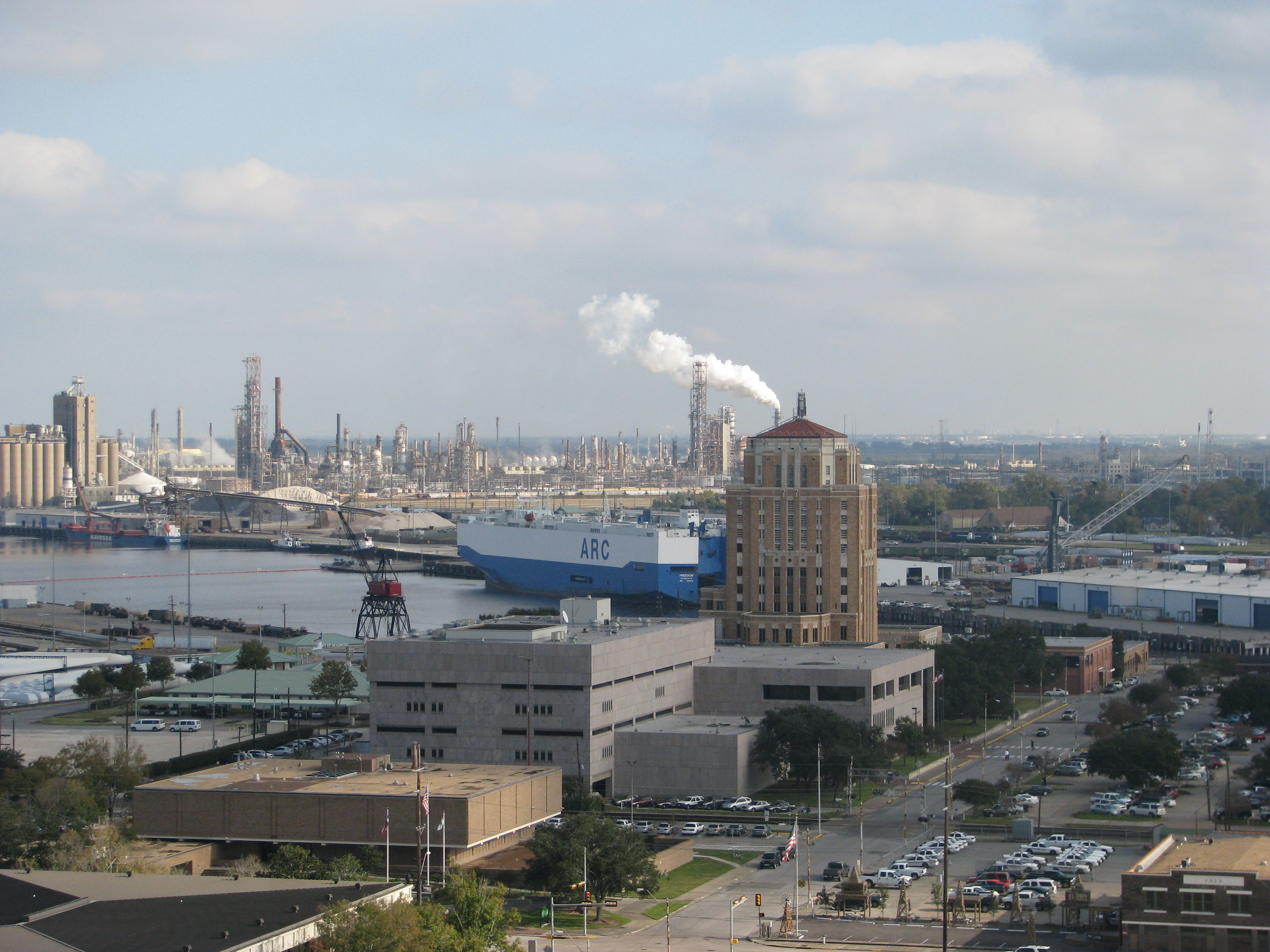

Location
- Country: United States
- Location: Beaumont, Texas
- Coordinates: 30°4′6″N 94°5′4″W
- UN/LOCODE: USBPT

Details
- Opened: 1908
- Operated by: Port of Beaumont Navigation District of Jefferson County
- Owned by: Port of Beaumont Navigation District of Jefferson County
- Type of harbour: Artificial / natural
- No. of berths: 12
- No. of wharfs: 12
- Port Commission Officers: Louis Broussard, President; Georgine Guillory, Vice President; Pat Anderson, Secretary-Treasurer; Chris Fisher, Director/CEO
- Commissioners: Bill C. Darling; Lee Smith; David Willard
- Number of major general cargo terminals: 3
- Grain Elevator: 3.5 million bushel capacity

Statistics
- Annual cargo tonnage: 94,403,631
- Annual revenue: $22,111,607
- Net income: $3,746,113
- Property and Equipment: $199,602,500
- Accumulated Depreciation: $91,064,798
- Website https://www.portofbeaumont.com

The Port of Beaumont is a deep-water port located in Beaumont, Texas near the mouth of the Neches River.

It is the fourth busiest port in the United States according to the American Association of Port Authorities U.S. Port Ranking by Cargo Tonnage, 2018 report, and the forty-seventh busiest in the world in terms of tonnage, according to the American Association of Port Authorities World Port Rankings 2013 report. It is also the busiest military port in the world for processing U.S. military equipment. The port serves as headquarters to the United States Army's 842d Transportation Battalion, which specializes in port logistical activity.

== Location ==
The port is located approximately 84 miles east of Houston and 270 miles west of New Orleans. It is about 42 miles inland from the Gulf of Mexico along the Sabine-Neches Waterway. The Sabine-Neches Waterway has a minimum depth of 40 feet and a minimum width of 400 feet. The Gulf Intracoastal Waterway is approximately 15 miles south of the port.

== Port features ==
The port includes a Roll-on/roll-off dock; 94 acres of open storage; 574,710 sq ft of covered storage; rail storage; a 1,100 ft diameter turning basin; and a 3.5 million bushel capacity grain elevator. The port has the largest harbor mobile crane in the Gulf of Mexico region, a 140 metric ton capacity crane with a 168-foot extension. The port also has three marine terminals. The Carroll Street wharf has 108,900 sq ft of covered storage and 1,435 ft of harbor front. The Harbor Island Marine terminal has 345,000 sq ft of covered and open storage with 1,880 feet of harbor frontage. The Jefferson Energy Terminal, located on 250 acres of land, has one barge dock and one ship dock.

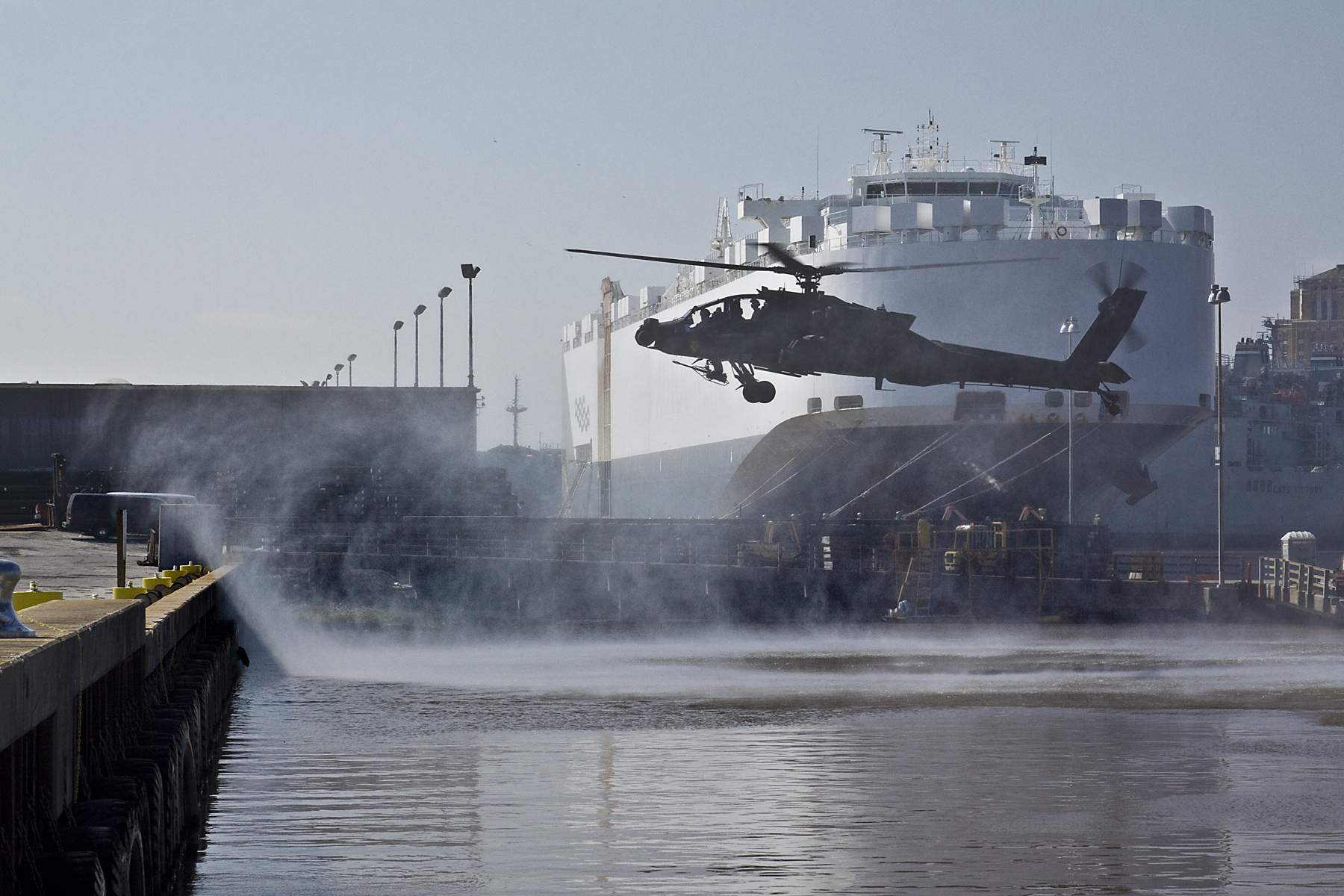
1st Air Cavalry Brigade takes 'birds' (helicopters) to Port of Beaumont

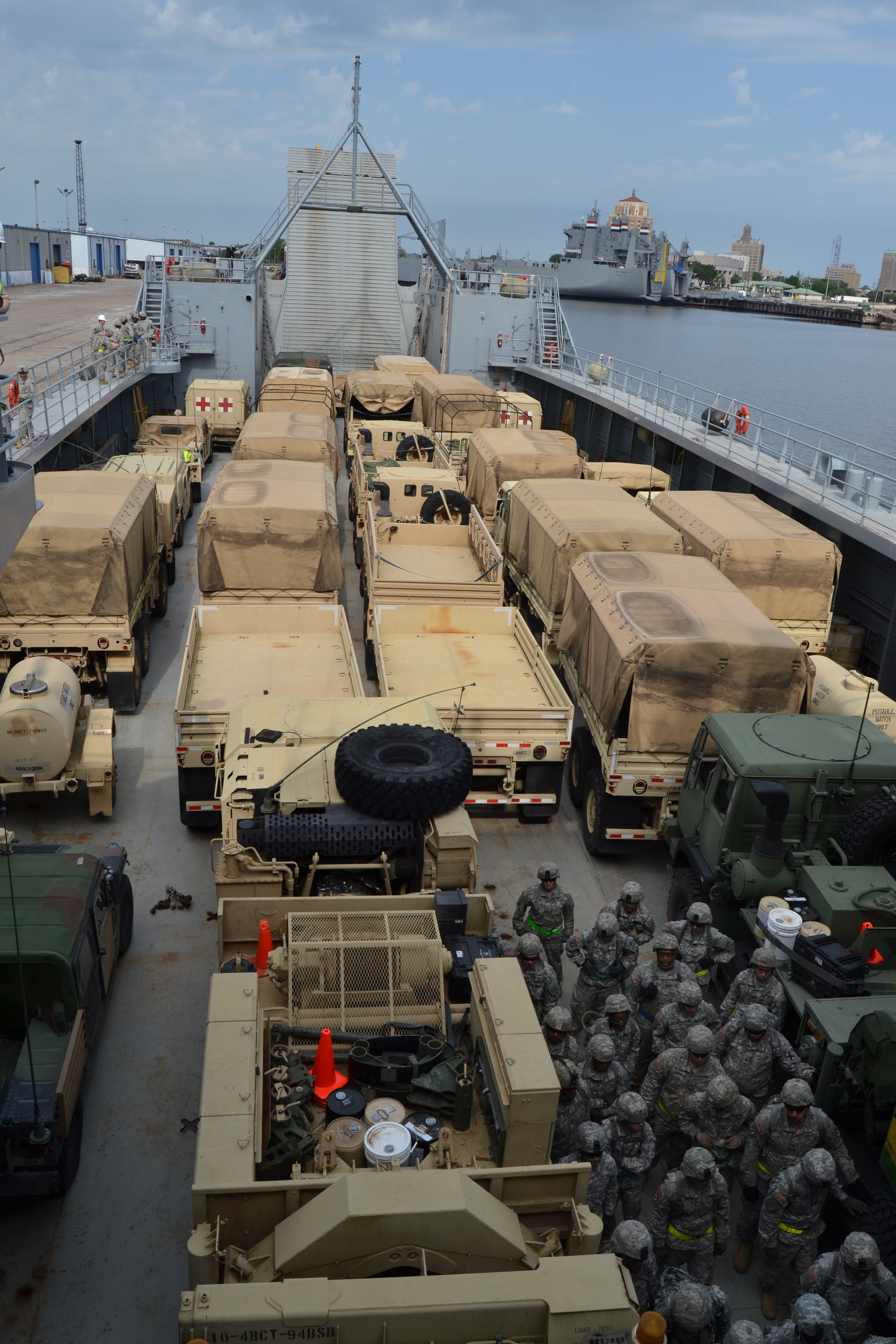
Ground soldiers take to the sea; provide expeditionary sustainment

== Access ==
The port has highway and rail access in addition to the Sabine-Neches Waterway gulf and ocean access, and close proximity to the Gulf Intracoastal Waterway. Interstate 10, US Highway 90, US Highway 69, US Highway 96, and US Highway 287 provide highway access. Three major railways, the Burlington Northern Santa Fe Railway, the Kansas City Southern Railway, and the Union Pacific Railway provide rail connections to the port.

== History ==
The Port of Beaumont handles the fourth-largest amount of shipping in the US, in tonnage, with only South Louisiana, Houston and Port Authority of New York and New Jersey handling more.

The port's origins date to 1908, when crews dug a 9-foot-deep canal in the Neches River from Beaumont, Texas to the existing Port Arthur ship channel. The port's channel was later deepened to 25 feet and a turning basin was added. By the 1940s, the channel's depth was increased to 40 feet.

Plans to deepen the Sabine-Neches Waterway to 48 feet received federal approval in 2014. The $1.1 billion deepening project is expected to start in 2017 and is estimated to take between 12 and 15 years to complete.

Once a division of the city of Beaumont, the port was established in 1949 by the 51st Texas Legislature as a navigation district, or separate taxing entity.

== Cargo ==
Principal cargoes serviced by the port include:

- Imports: Forest products (eucalyptus pulp), aggregate, military cargo, project cargo, wind turbine components, iron and steel and other metal articles.
- Exports: Bulk grain, military cargo, iron and steel, vehicles, crude oil, diesel, gasoline and bagged goods.
