= Port of Jingtang =

Port of Jingtang (京唐港)
- Interactive map of Port of Jingtang (京唐港)
- Location within Hebei Location within China

Location
- Country: People's Republic of China
- Location: Jingtang, Hebei Province, northeastern China
- Coordinates: 39°12′32″N 119°00′07″E

Details
- Opened: 1989
- Operated by: Jingtang Port Group Corporation, Ltd., Tangshan port (Hebei Port Group)
- Owned by: People's Republic of China
- Type of Harbor: Artificial Deep-water Seaport

Statistics
- Annual cargo tonnage: metric tons/year
- Website; Port of Jingtang Tangshan website

The Port of Jingtang (京唐港) is an artificial deep-water international seaport on the coast of Tangshan Municipality, Hebei, in Northern China. It is part of the Tangshan port complex, which consists of Jingtang, Caofeidian and Fengnan ports. Combined, they constitute the 9th largest port in China.

Jingtang port is separately but considered along with Caofeidian and Fengnan as Tangshan port for statistical purposes. The Port of Tangshan is one of the fastest growing ports in the world and is counted among the ten largest ports of China.

== Location and Layout ==
Jingtang port is located in Bohai bay (Bohai sea) close to the port of Tianjin.

China MSA's Seaways Plan for the Bohai Sea. Planned routes follow closely the seaways currently in use

It is part of Tangshan port (along with Caofeidian and Fengnan), though Jingtang has a separate UN Locode and is specified as a separate entity in maritime charter parties and in bills of lading. The closest airport to the port is that of Tianjin which is about 2 hours away. A new high speed train under construction is expected to shorten the distance from Beijing to Tangshan to even lesser.
