= Porto do Itaqui =

Coordinates: 2°34′21″S 44°21′51″W

Port of Itaqui
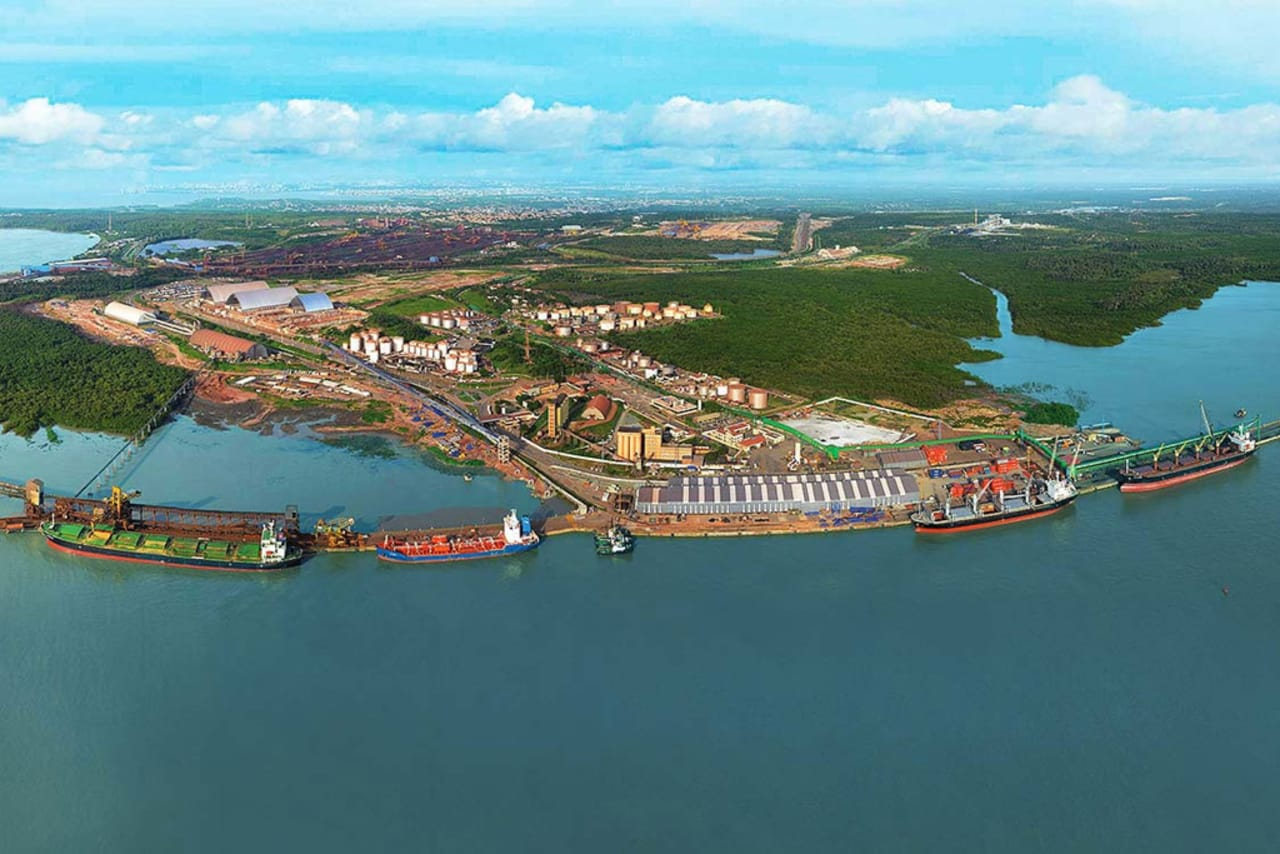
- Click on the map for a fullscreen view

Port of Itaqui is a Brazilian port located in the city of São Luís, Maranhão. It is not to be confused with the city of Itaqui, in the state of Rio Grande do Sul, near the border with Argentina. The main cargoes include aluminum ingots and bars, pig iron, general, dry and liquid bulk cargoes, soybean and copper. The hinterland of the Port of Itaqui encompasses the states of Maranhão, Piauí, Tocantins, southwestern Pará, northern Goiás, northeastern Mato Grosso, and western Bahia.

== History ==
In 1939 studies developed by Departamento Nacional de Portos, Rios e Canais – DNPRC (Nacional Department Of Ports, Rivers and Channels) in the Ministério da Aviação e Obras Públicas (Transport and Public Construction Ministry) pointed the Itaqui Region as a good place for a new port in Maranhão due to its sheltering waters and excellent water depth near the coast. However, the port building started only in 1966. In July 1974 the new port facilities started working under the management of the Companhia Docas do Maranhão – Codomar (Maranhão Dock Company). In 2000, management of the Port of Itaqui was passed to the Maranhão state government.

The Empresa Maranhense de Administração Portuária – EMAP (Maranhense Port Handling Company), a privately held public company, was established to manage and exploit São José de Ribamar Wharf, the ferry-boat terminals of Ponta da Espera and Cujupe, besides the Port of Itaqui.

== Location ==
The port of Itaqui can be reached by highway (Highway BR- 135), railway (1 m gauge rail operated by Companhia Ferroviária do Nordeste – CFN as well as 1.60 gauge rails operated by Estrada de Ferro Carajás - EFC and Ferrovia Norte-Sul), plane (from Marechal Cunha Machado International Airport in São Luís), river (through the shallow rivers of Mearim, Pindaré, dos Cachorros, and Grajaú) and of course by sea (through a 1.8 km wide channel with a minimum depth of 23 m).

== Facilities ==
- A wharf which is 1,616 m long and 9 m up deep.
- Six berths with water depths ranging from 9.5 m to 19 m.
- A 7,500 m² warehouse for bulk cargo.
- A 3,000 m² impounded warehouse for dry bulk cargo.
- Four storing dockyards, totalling 42,000 m².
- Four vertical silos for grains with a total capacity of 12,000 tons.
- One horizontal silo for grain with a capacity of 8,000 tons.
- Eight vertical silos with a total capacity of 7,200 tons.
- Sixty-six tanks for liquid bulk cargo with a total tank volume of 320,000 m³.
- Two spheres for storing LPG with a total volume of 8,680 m³.
- One operational tanker wharf (an additional tanker wharf is not yet operational).

== Equipment ==
- Three reach stackers for container handling.
- a 64 tons and a 104 tons capacity load crane for dry bulk cargo, containers and bulk cargo.
- Two ship loaders.
- Twenty stackers.

== Supporting Facilities ==
Electric power as well as water and fuel supplies are available. Piloting is provided by Servprat – Serviços de Praticagem da Baía de São Marcos Ltda. Tugboating is available from TUG BRASIL, Consórcio de Rebocadores da Baía de São Marcos, Internacional Marítima, and Smith rebras.

== Private Terminals ==
The Maranhão Port Complex includes two private terminals, the Ponta da Madeira Terminal (Vale) and the Alumar Terminal.
