= Port of Ulsan =

- The Ulsan Shipyard
- Interactive map of Port of Ulsan

Location
- Country: South Korea
- Location: Ulsan
- Coordinates: 35°31′N 129°22′E
- UN/LOCODE: KRUSN

The Port of Ulsan is a port in South Korea, located in the city of Ulsan.

Hyundai Heavy Industries Ulsan Shipyard & Gunsan shipyard, in Ulsan is currently the largest in the world and has the capability to build a variety of vessels including Commercial Cargo, FPSO offshore, container ship, LNG Carrier, Car carriers, Tankers like VLCC & ULCC, Iron ore carrier, and Naval vessels like Aegis destroyers & submarines.
