= Port of Gwangyang =

- Interactive map of Port of Gwangyang

Location
- Country: South Korea
- Location: Gwangyang, South Jeolla
- Coordinates: 34.9°N 127.75°E
- UN/LOCODE: KRKAN

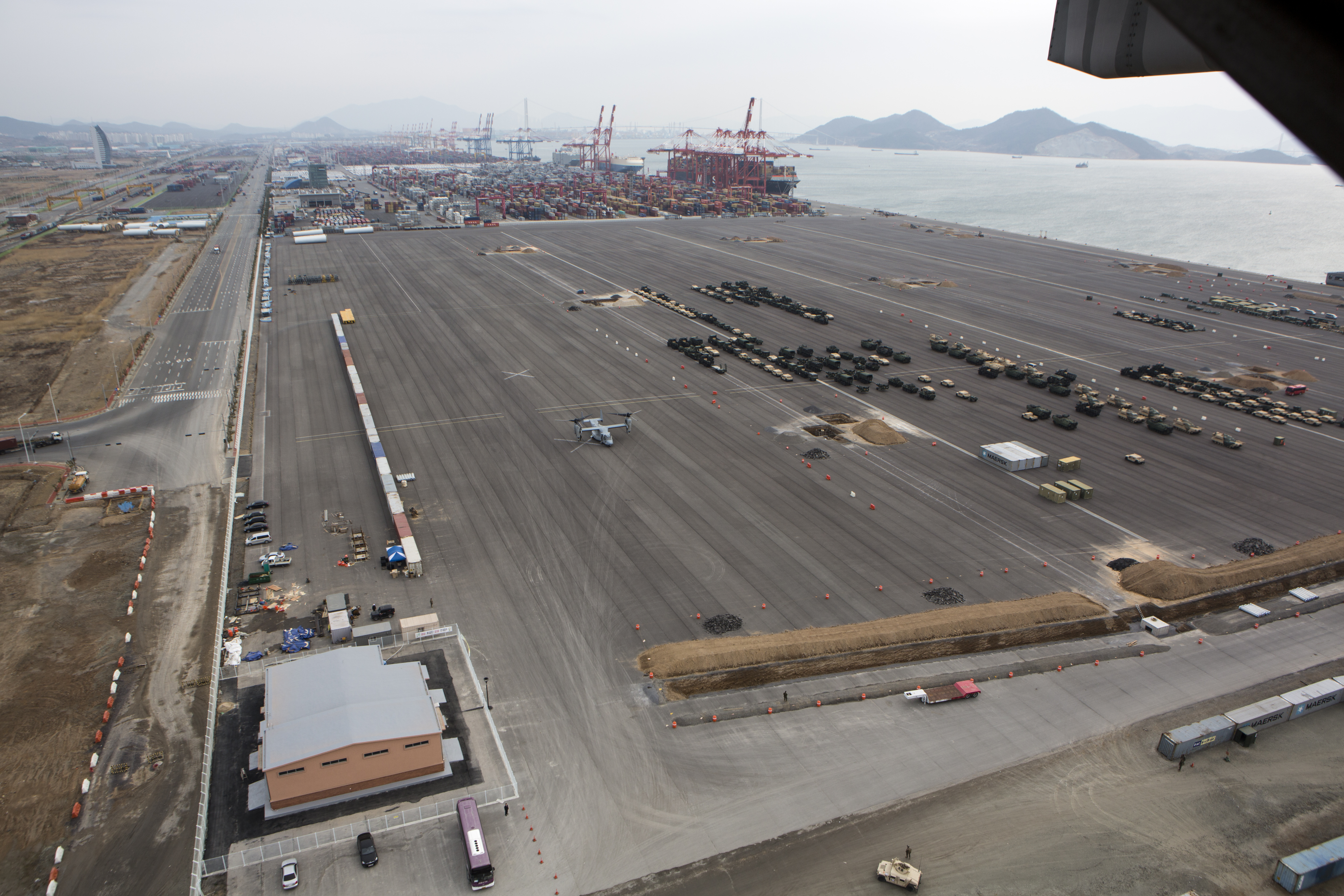

The Port of Gwangyang (Korean: 광양항; Hanja: 光陽港) is a port in South Korea, located in the city of Gwangyang, South Jeolla Province. It opened on December 5, 1986.

== current situation ==
Gwangyang Port has a surface area of 145.19km^{2} in the port, with a total of 43,000 ships per year, including 97 berths, container ships, oil tankers, product ships, chemical ships, and LNG ships, and an average of 118 ships per day, and can handle more than 200 million tons of cargo per year. As of 2024, the total cargo volume is second in Korea, and the container volume is third after Busan Port (including Busan New Port) and Incheon Port.
