= Port of Huanghua =

Coordinates: 38°11′43″N 117°51′11″E

Port of Huanghua 黄骅港
- Interactive map of Port of Huanghua 黄骅港

Location
- Country: People's Republic of China
- Location: Huanghua, Hebei Province

Details
- Opened: 1992
- Operated by: Hebei Port Group Corporation, Ltd.
- Owned by: People's Republic of China
- Type of Harbor: Artificial Deep-water Seaport
- No. of wharfs: 4

Statistics
- Annual cargo tonnage: 171 million tons (2013)
- Annual container volume: 200,000 TEU (2013)
- Website; Ports of Hebei website

The Port of Huanghua, also known as the Port of Cangzhou Huanghua, is an artificial deep-water international seaport on the coast of Huanghua, Cangzhou Prefecture, Hebei, People's Republic of China. It is located on the south side of the Bohai Bay, 90 km from Cangzhou city. Huanghua port is one of the largest and fastest growing ports in North China, with a throughput of 171.03 million tons of total cargo in 2013, an increase of 35.42% year on year.

Throughput increased to 204 million tonnes in the first ten months of 2016, largely due to coal transportation. Investment in the port is over $8 billion, and over 20 shipping companies opened 13 shipping lines from the port.

Huanghua Port is owned by China Shenhua Energy, and its port division provides all coal transportation services at Huanghua.

== Layout ==
The Port of Huanghua is divided into four port areas: the Coal Port Area (煤炭港区), the Comprehensive Cargo Port Area (综合港区), the Estuary Port Area (河口港区), and the Bulk Cargo Port Area (散货港区), which is under construction.

The port currently operates a total of 10 berths including two general bulk berths, two general cargo berths and four multipurpose berths. Construction of two 200,000-tonne ore berths was completed in 2015. When fully developed the port will cover 141 square kilometres.

== Administration ==
The Huanghua Port is operated by the Qinhuangdao Port Co., Ltd, a subsidiary of the Hebei Port Group Co., Ltd.

== Operations ==
In 2016, Huanghua Port became the largest coal transportation port in China. In 2016, it shipped over 170 million tonnes of coal, a year on year increase of 47%.
