= Port of Suzhou =

Port of Suzhou 苏州港
- Interactive map of Port of Suzhou 苏州港

Location
- Country: China
- Location: Suzhou, Jiangsu
- Coordinates: 31.799391°N 120.859222°E

Details
- Opened: 2002
- Owned by: Suzhou Municipal Government
- Type of harbour: Inland port
- No. of berths: 224

Statistics
- Annual cargo tonnage: 479 million tons (6th, 2014)
- Annual container volume: 4.45 million TEU (2014)

Port of Suzhou
- Traditional Chinese: 蘇州港
- Simplified Chinese: 苏州港
Transcriptions
Standard Mandarin
- Hanyu Pinyin: Sūzhōu Gǎng
Wu
- Suzhounese: sou^{1}-tseu^{1} kaon^{3}

Port of Suzhou is the collective name of three ports around the city of Suzhou, Jiangsu Province, China. The three ports are located in Zhangjiagang, Changshu and Taicang, respectively, on the lower reaches of the Yangtze River. The total cargo throughput of 454 million tons in 2013. As of 2013, it is the busiest inland river port in the world by annual cargo tonnage and container volume, as well as the sixth-busiest port by annual cargo tonnage. The majority of the port trade is in coal, ore, steel, and construction materials such as cement.

== Port infrastructure ==
As of 2011, Port of Suzhou consist of 224 production berths in total, 106 of them being above ten thousand tons in tonnage. The port has trade with over 400 international and domestic shipping lines.
