= Container industry in China =

China's container industry started in the late 1970s and early 1980s. After 20 years' development, the annual production capacity was approximately 5.8 million TEU, which was 145 times as large as 20 years before, accounting for over 96% of the world's production capacity.

== Types ==
With the requirements of the international shipping industry, the ISO containers and non-ISO containers made in China are nearly all exported to other countries. The international market share of China's containers is getting larger and there have been various products released since 1993. The product structure was very simple at the beginning, but now it has various products for special purposes, including many cargo containers such as warm-keeping containers, pot containers, dry bulk cargo containers, regional special containers, semi-trailer containers, and so on. Altogether, it has about 900 types with different sizes which can meet the needs of customers all over the world.

== Records ==
China's container industry has made three world records since 1993, namely:

- container types,
- container manufacturing capacity, and
- size as well as container sales, which have ranked as the world's first for fifteen continuous years (1993–2008).

== See also ==
- Containerization
- Intermodal freight transport
