= Port of Tangshan =

- Interactive map of Port of Tangshan
- Location within Hebei Location within China

Location
- Country: People's Republic of China
- Location: Tangshan, Hebei Province, China
- Coordinates: 39°12′34″N 119°00′09″E

Details
- Opened: 1989
- Operated by: Tangshan Port Group Corporation, Ltd. Hebei Port Group
- Owned by: People's Republic of China
- Type of Harbor: Artificial Deep-water Seaport

Statistics
- Annual cargo tonnage: metric tons/year
- Website; Port of Tangshan website

The Port of Tangshan (唐山港) is an artificial deep-water international seaport on the coast of Tangshan Municipality, Hebei, in Northern China. It is the 9th largest port in China and is composed of three separate port areas: Jingtang, Caofeidian and Fengnan (丰南), administered separately but considered to be the same port for statistical purposes. The Port of Tangshan is one of the fastest-growing ports in the world and is counted among the ten largest ports of China.

== Layout ==
The port of Tangshan consists of three separate port areas: Jingtang (京唐港), Caofeidian and Fengnan (丰南). These are administered separately and have different UNLocodes, but are often considered to be the same port for statistical purposes. The closest airport to the port is Tianjin which is 2 hours away. A new high speed train under construction will shorten the distance from Beijing to Tangshan to less than 2 hours.
