= Port of Shanghai =

Port in Shanghai, China

Port of Shanghai 上海港
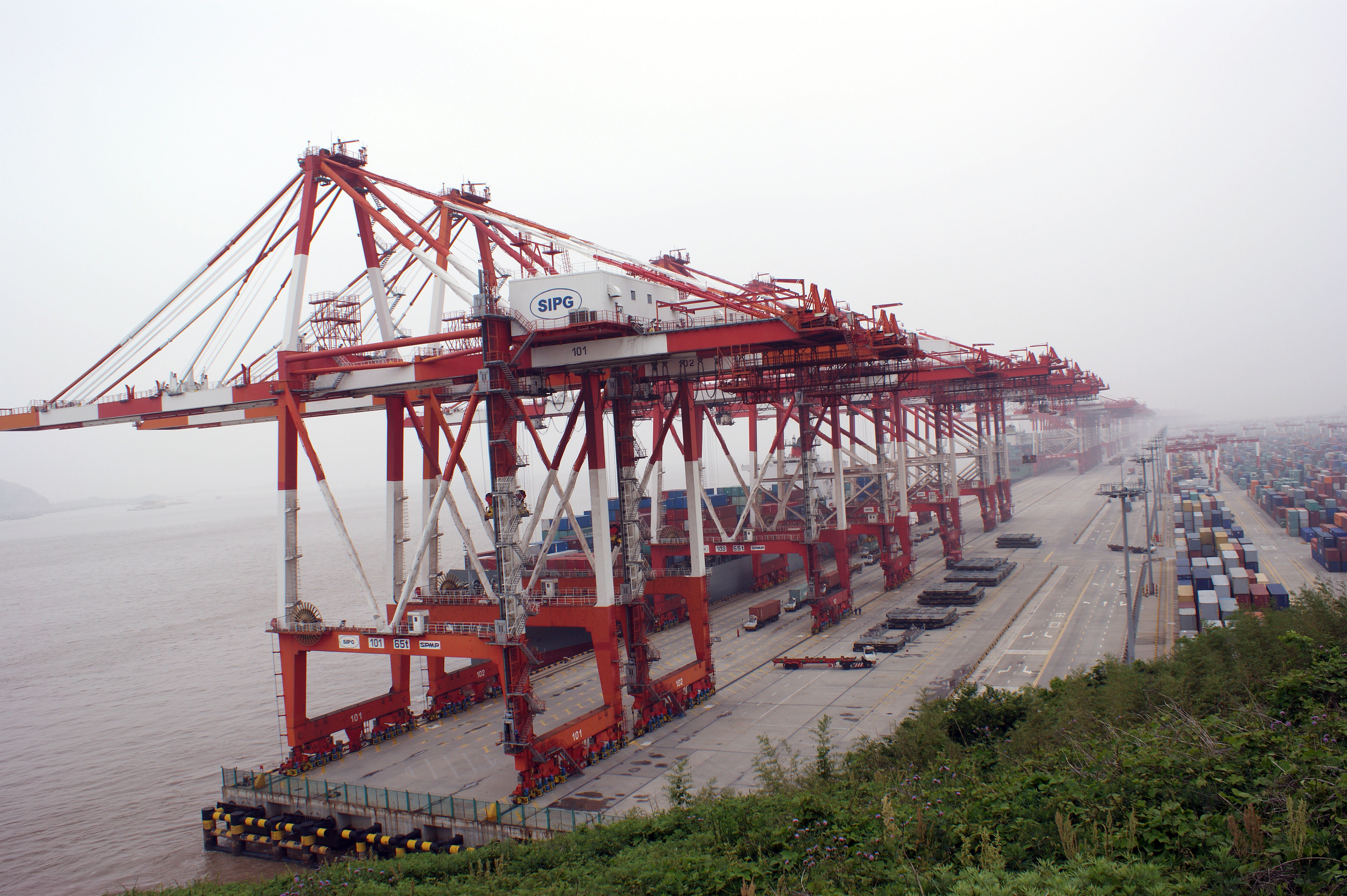
- Yangshan Deep-water Port
- Interactive map of Port of Shanghai 上海港
- Location within China

Location
- Country: People's Republic of China
- Location: Shanghai
- Coordinates: 30.626539°N 122.064958°E

Details
- Opened: 1842 (As treaty port)
- Operated by: Shanghai International Port Company Ltd.
- Owned by: Public
- Type of Harbor: Deep-water seaport/Riverport

Statistics
- Annual cargo tonnage: 1.120 billion (2024)
- Annual container volume: 43.3 million TEU (2019)
- Website: en.portshanghai.com.cn (English); portshanghai.com.cn

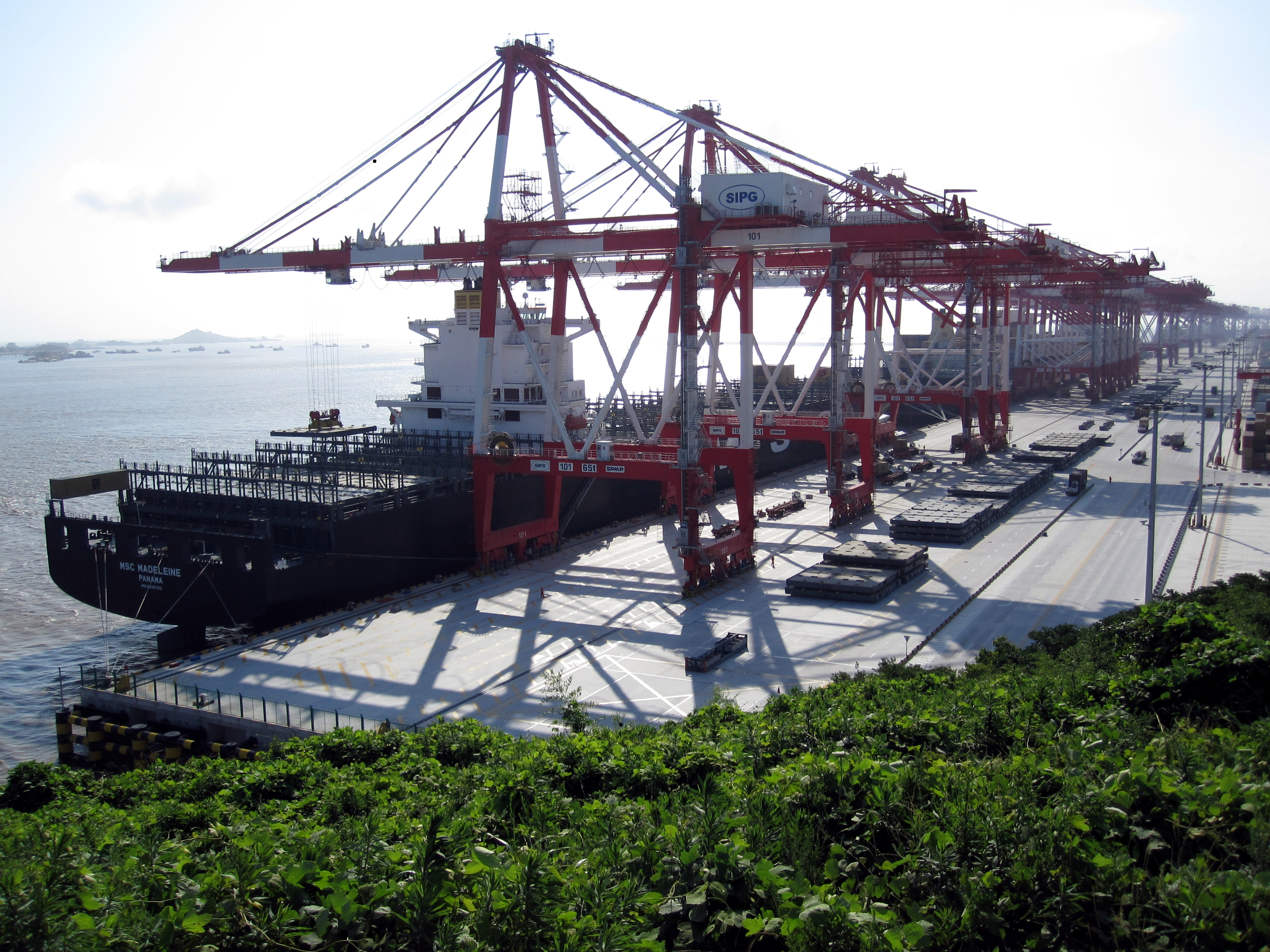
Shanghai is the world's busiest container port.

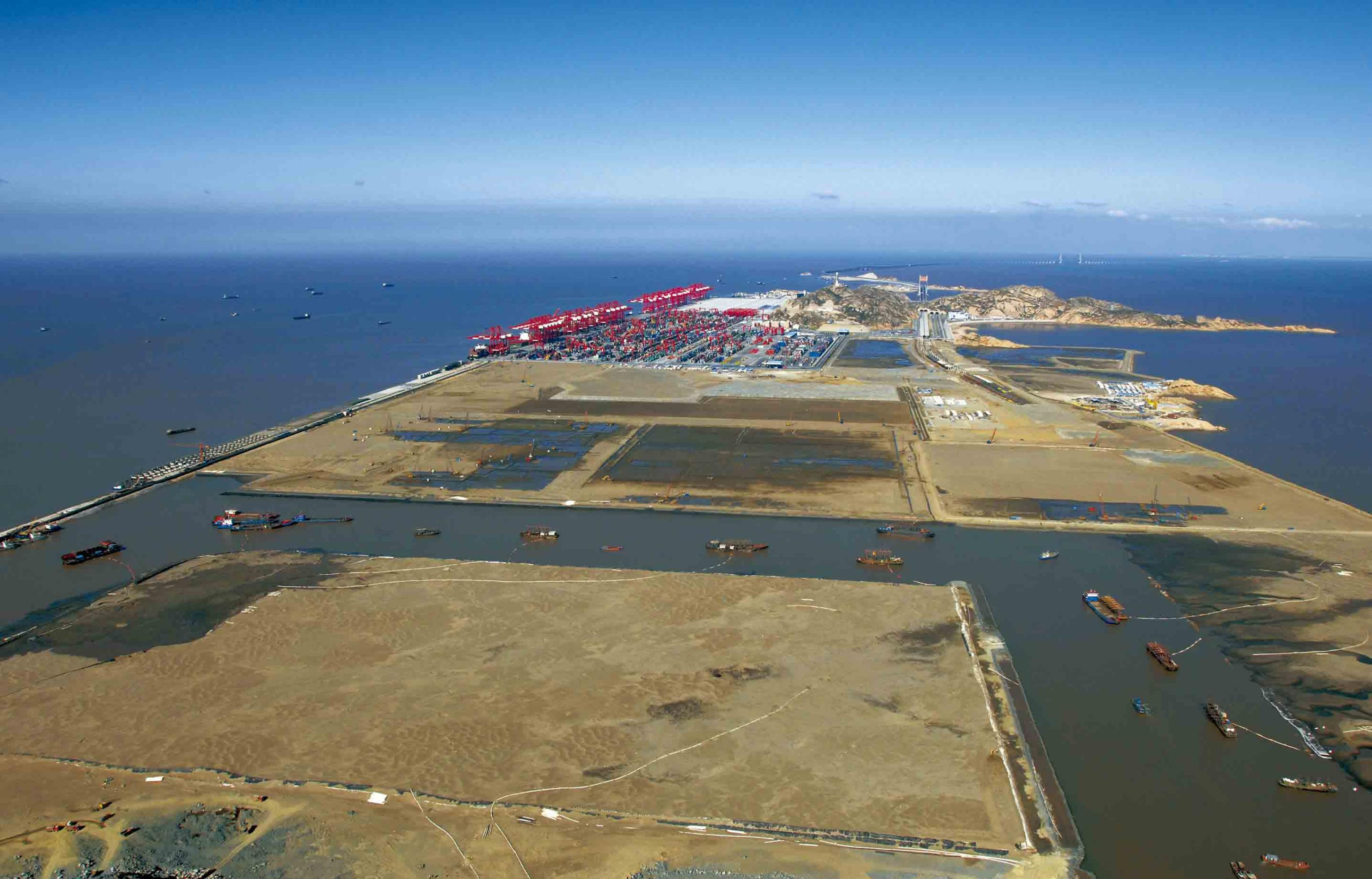
Yangshan Deepwater Port under construction

The Port of Shanghai (Chinese: 上海港; pinyin: Shànghǎi Gǎng, Wu: Zånhae Kån) is located in the vicinity of Shanghai. It comprises a deep-sea port and a river port.

The main port enterprise in Shanghai, the Shanghai International Port Group (SIPG), was established during the reconstitution of the Shanghai Port Authority. Companies such as the Shanghai Port Container Co. and Waigaoqiao Bonded Zone Port Co. were involved.

In 2010, Shanghai port overtook the Port of Singapore to become the world's busiest container port. Shanghai's port handled 29.05 million TEU, whereas Singapore's was a half million TEU behind. Shanghai handled 43.3 million TEU in 2019.

Shanghai is one of only four port-cities in the world to be categorised as a large-port Megacity, due to its high volumes of port traffic and large urban population.

== Geography ==
The Port of Shanghai faces the East China Sea to the east and Hangzhou Bay to the south. It includes the confluences of the Yangtze River, Huangpu River (which enters the Yangtze River) and Qiantang River.

== Administration ==
The Port of Shanghai is managed by Shanghai International Port, which superseded the Shanghai Port Authority in 2003. Shanghai International Port Company Limited is a public listed company, of which the Shanghai Municipal Government owns 44% of the outstanding shares.

== History ==
In 1842, Shanghai became a treaty port, thus developing into an international commercial city. By the early 20th century, it was the largest city and the largest port in East Asia. In 1949, with the Communist takeover in Shanghai, overseas trade was cut dramatically. The early economic policies of the People's Republic severely hindered Shanghai's infrastructure and capital development.

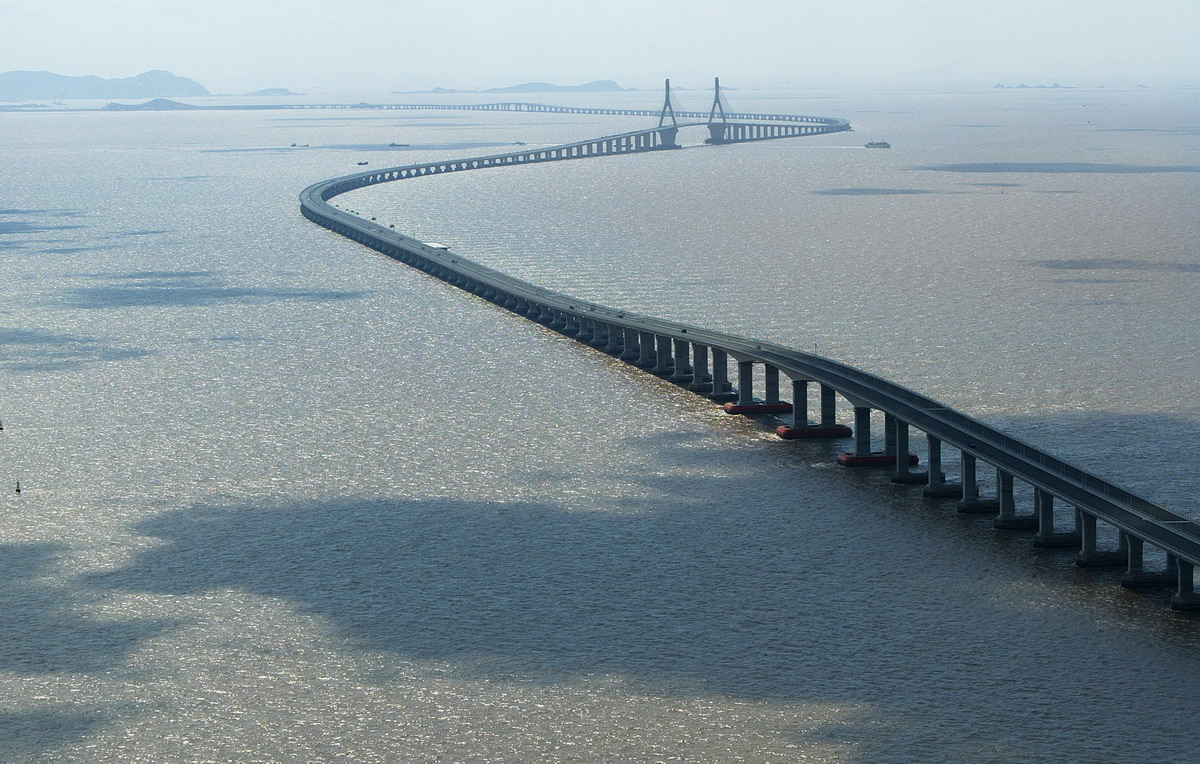
Donghai Bridge

In 1991, the central government authorized Shanghai to begin economic reforms. Since then, the port has expanded rapidly. By 2005, the Yangshan deep-water port had been built on the Yangshan islands, a group of islands in Hangzhou Bay linked to Shanghai by the Donghai Bridge. This development allowed the port to overcome shallow water conditions in its current location and to rival another deep-water port, the nearby Port of Ningbo-Zhoushan.

The port is part of the 21st Century Maritime Silk Road that runs from the Chinese coast to Singapore, towards the southern tip of India to Mombasa, from there through the Red Sea via the Suez Canal to the Mediterranean, there to the Upper Adriatic region to the northern Italian hub of Trieste with its connections to Central Europe and the North Sea.

== Harbour zones ==
The port of Shanghai includes three major working zones:

- Yangshan Deep Water Port
- Huangpu River
- Yangtze River

== Economy ==
The Port of Shanghai is a critically important transport hub for the Yangtze River region and the most important gateway for foreign trade. It serves the Yangtze economically developed hinterland of Anhui, Jiangsu, Zhejiang and Henan provinces with its dense population, strong industrial base and developed agricultural sector.

== Data ==
Million tonnes moved
| year |
| 1984 | 100 |
| 1999 | 186 |
| 2005 | 443 |
| 2006 | 537 |
| 2007 | 561 |
| 2008 | 582 |
| 2009 | 590 |
| 2010 | 650 |
| 2011 | 728 |
| 2012 | 736 |
| 2014 | 755 |
| 2024 | 1120 |
Sources: ShipTechnology.com, GeoHive

== See also ==
- Container transport
- List of East Asian ports
- List of ports in China
- Silk Road
- List of deepest natural harbours
