= Port of Ningbo-Zhoushan =

Port of Ningbo-Zhoushan 宁波舟山港
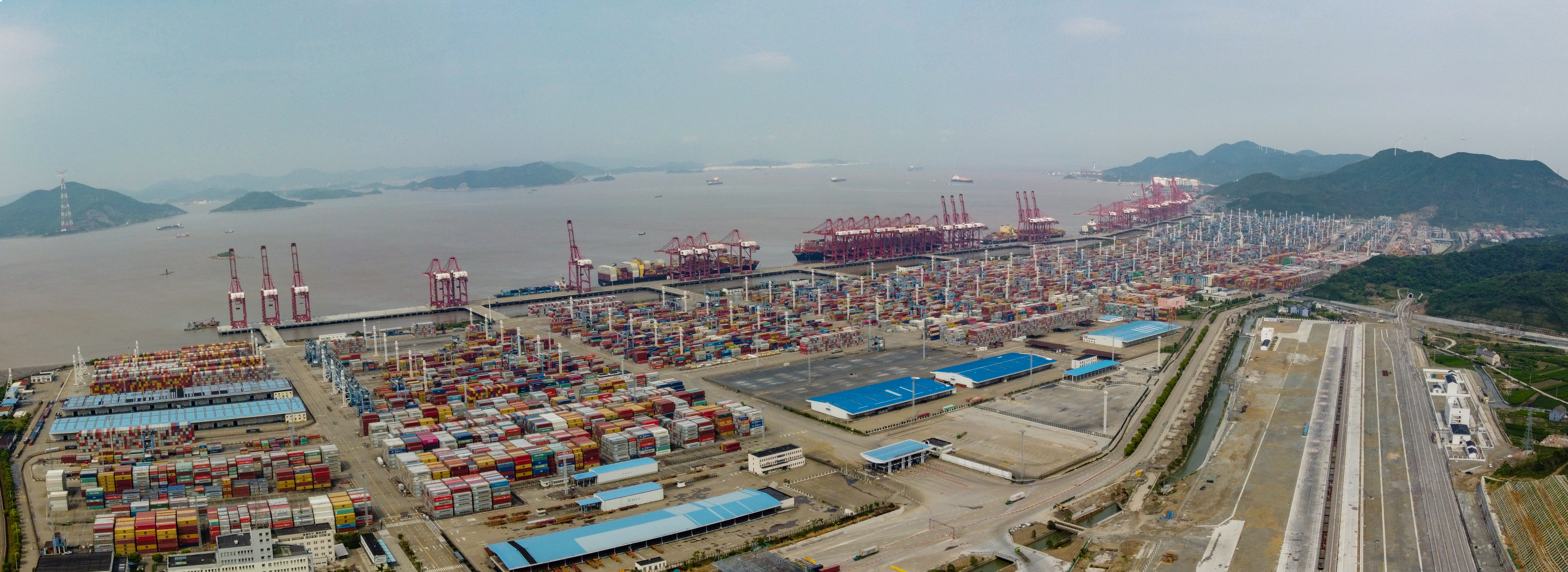
- Interactive map of Port of Ningbo-Zhoushan 宁波舟山港
- Location within Zhejiang Location within East China Sea

Location
- Country: China
- Location: Ningbo & Zhoushan, Zhejiang
- Coordinates: 29°56′N 121°50′E

Details
- Owned by: Ningbo Zhoushan Port Co., Ltd. (SSE: 601018)

Statistics
- Annual cargo tonnage: 744 million (2012)
- Annual container volume: 16.83 million (2012)

Port of Ningbo-Zhoushan
- Simplified Chinese: 宁波舟山港
- Traditional Chinese: 寧波舟山港
Transcriptions
Standard Mandarin
- Hanyu Pinyin: Níngbō-Zhōushān Gǎng
Wu
- Romanization: nyin1 pou1 kaon2

The Port of Ningbo-Zhoushan is the busiest port in the world in terms of cargo tonnage. It handled 888.96 million tons of cargo in 2015. The port is located in Ningbo and Zhoushan, on the coast of the East China Sea, in Zhejiang province on the southeast end of Hangzhou Bay, across which it faces the municipality of Shanghai.

The port is at the crossroads of the north–south inland and coastal shipping route, including canals to the important inland waterway to interior China, the Yangtze River, to the north. The port consists of several ports which are Beilun (seaport), Zhenhai (estuary port), and old Ningbo harbor (inland river port).

The operator of the port, Ningbo Zhoushan Port Co., Ltd. (NZP), is a listed company, but it is 76.31% owned by state-owned Ningbo Zhoushan Port Group Co., Ltd., as of 30 June 2017.

== History ==
Ningbo Port was established in 738. During the Tang dynasty (618–907), it was known as one of the three major seaports for foreign trade under the name "Mingzhou", along with Yangzhou and Guangzhou.

In the Song dynasty, it became one of the three major port cities for foreign trade, together with Guangzhou and Quanzhou. It was designated as one of the "Five Treaty Ports" along with Guangzhou, Xiamen, Fuzhou and Shanghai after the 1842 Treaty of Nanking that ended the First Opium War.

In 2006, the Port of Ningbo was merged with the neighboring Port of Zhoushan to form a combined cargo handling center. The combined Ningbo-Zhoushan Port handled a total cargo volume of 744,000,000 metric tons of cargo in 2012, making it the largest port in the world in terms of cargo tonnage, surpassing the Port of Shanghai for the first time.

The port is part of the 21st Century Maritime Silk Road that runs from the Chinese coast to Singapore, towards the southern tip of India to Mombasa, from there through the Red Sea via the Suez Canal to the Mediterranean, there to the Upper Adriatic region to the northern Italian hub of Trieste with its connections to Central Europe and the North Sea.

== Economic trade ==
The Port of Ningbo-Zhoushan is involved in economic trade with cargo shipment, raw materials and manufactured goods from as far as North and South America and Oceania. It has economic trade with over 560 ports from more than 90 countries and regions in the world. It is one of a growing number of ports in China with a cargo throughput volume exceeding 100 million tons annually.

The water quality within Ningbo-Zhoushan Port has become badly polluted over the past ten years, due to the massive scale of maritime traffic constantly in operation.

=== Port infrastructure ===
The Port of Ningbo-Zhoushan complex is a modern multi-purpose deep water port, consisting of inland, estuary, and coastal harbors. There are a total of 191 berths including 39 deep water berths with 10,000 and more tonnage.

The larger ports include a 250,000 tonnage crude oil terminal and a 200,000+ tonnage ore loading berth. There is also a purpose-built terminal for 6th generation container vessels and a 50,000 tonnage berth dedicated for liquid chemical products.

In August 2020, the Ningbo-Zhoushan Port (NZP) Group, together with Brazilian iron ore miner Vale, inaugurated the Shulanghu (鼠浪湖码头) grinding hub, after a collaboration that began in 2016. This was followed in November 2020 by an CN¥4.3 billion (US$650.6 million) investment deal. The Zhejiang Free Trade Zone was quoted as stating that an "iron ore storage yard, with a maximum capacity of 4.1 million tonnes, an ore blending and processing facility and two shipping berths" would be built.
