= Port of Yantai =

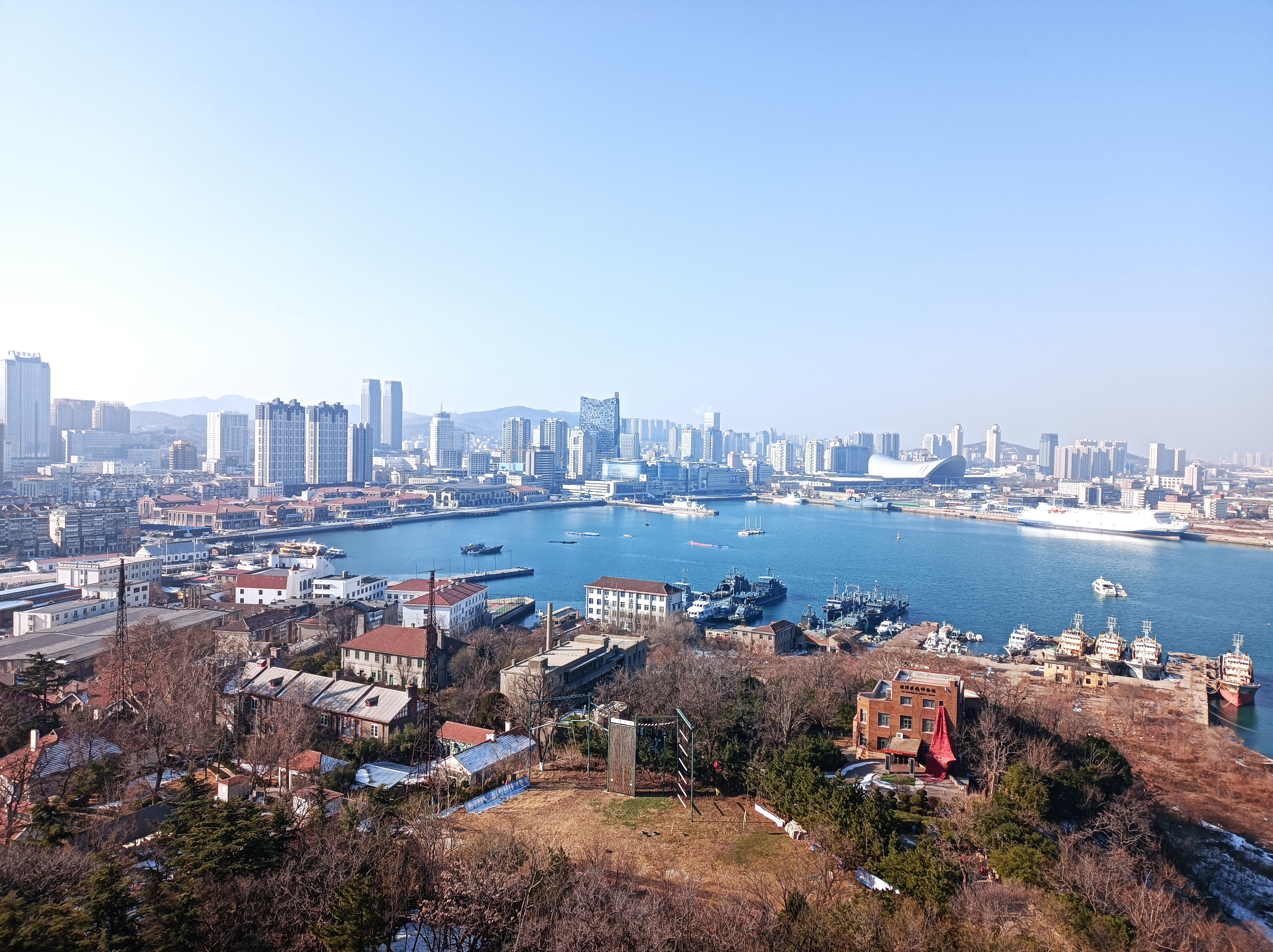
- Yantai port harbor
- Interactive map of Port of Yantai
- Location in China

Location
- Location: China
- Coordinates: 37°32′00″N 121°23′00″E

The Port of Yantai (Chinese: 烟台港) is a seaport on the Yellow Sea in the vicinity of Yantai, Shandong, People's Republic of China.

== History ==
As of December 14, 2011 the port had handled 200 million tonnes of cargo, becoming the 10th port in China that has a throughput of more than 200 million tonnes. The port's volume is estimated to hit 300 million tonnes by 2015. During the period from 2001 to 2005, Yantai invested US$2 billion on port construction, building 40 new berths, raising the percentage of 10,000-tonne berths from 27% at the end of 2000.

In 2011 the Port of Yantai, together with three other Chinese ports in East China's Shandong province, signed a strategic alliance with the largest port of the Republic of Korea (ROK). The alliance is jointly formed by Shandong's Qingdao Port, Port of Yantai, Port of Rizhao, Port of Weihai and the ROK's Port of Busan, aiming to build a shipping and logistics center in Northeast Asia.
