= Port of Zhanjiang =

Port in Guangdong, China

Coordinates: 21.1771°N 110.4153°E

- Chinese: 湛江港
Transcriptions
Standard Mandarin
- Hanyu Pinyin: Zhànjiāng Gǎng
Yue: Cantonese
- Jyutping: Zaam^{3}gong^{1} Gong^{2}
Southern Min
- Leizhou Romanization: Tchiàm-kōng Kang

The Port of Zhanjiang is a natural deepwater harbor in Southeast China. It was designed and reconstructed as China's first modern port, the project being commenced in 1956. After nearly 50 years of construction, the existing 39 wharves are able to handle the containers, general cargo and bulk cargo that arrives at the port. It also has facilities for dangerous goods, petroleum, chemicals, liquid chemicals, storage, packaging, commercial and transit passengers, ferries, freight forwarding, shipping agents, ship transport, bonded warehouses and exports. Since 2004, the port has become a multimodal transit hub.

Zhanjiang Port is also the headquarters of the South Sea Fleet of the People's Liberation Army Navy.

== Geography ==
Zhanjiang Port is located at the southernmost tip of mainland China's Guangdong province, in other words, the edge of the Leizhou Peninsula (French: Péninsule de Luichow). It is a natural deep water port sheltered by an island which forms a natural barrier resulting in it having broad, calm waters.

== History ==
The Port of Zhanjiang was a minor fishing port until the French occupied the area in 1898. The French called it Fort Bayard, and hoped to develop it into a free port, however, the area was very impoverished which militated against this. The French remained in charge until the Japanese conquered the area in 1943 during World War II. After the war it was returned to the French but General Charles de Gaulle signed it over to China in 1946.

In 1984 it was made an open city, inviting foreign investment and stimulating international industrial development.

== Port infrastructure ==
Since 1999 the three main construction projects have been the implementation of the 300,000 ton crude oil terminal in 2002, the 250,000-ton iron ore terminal in 2005 and the deep-water channel. Vessels up to 280 thousand DWT can be accommodated at the port. In 2006, the port handled over 35.5 million tons of general cargo, 182 thousand TEUs in containers and more than 50 million tons of domestic cargoes.

=== Port terminal ===
- 300,000-ton oil terminal
- 250,000-ton iron ore terminal

== Reference sources ==
- Zhanjiang Port Profile- Official Website
- Port Overview
