= Port of Busan =

Port of Busan Korean: 부산항 Hanja: 釜山港
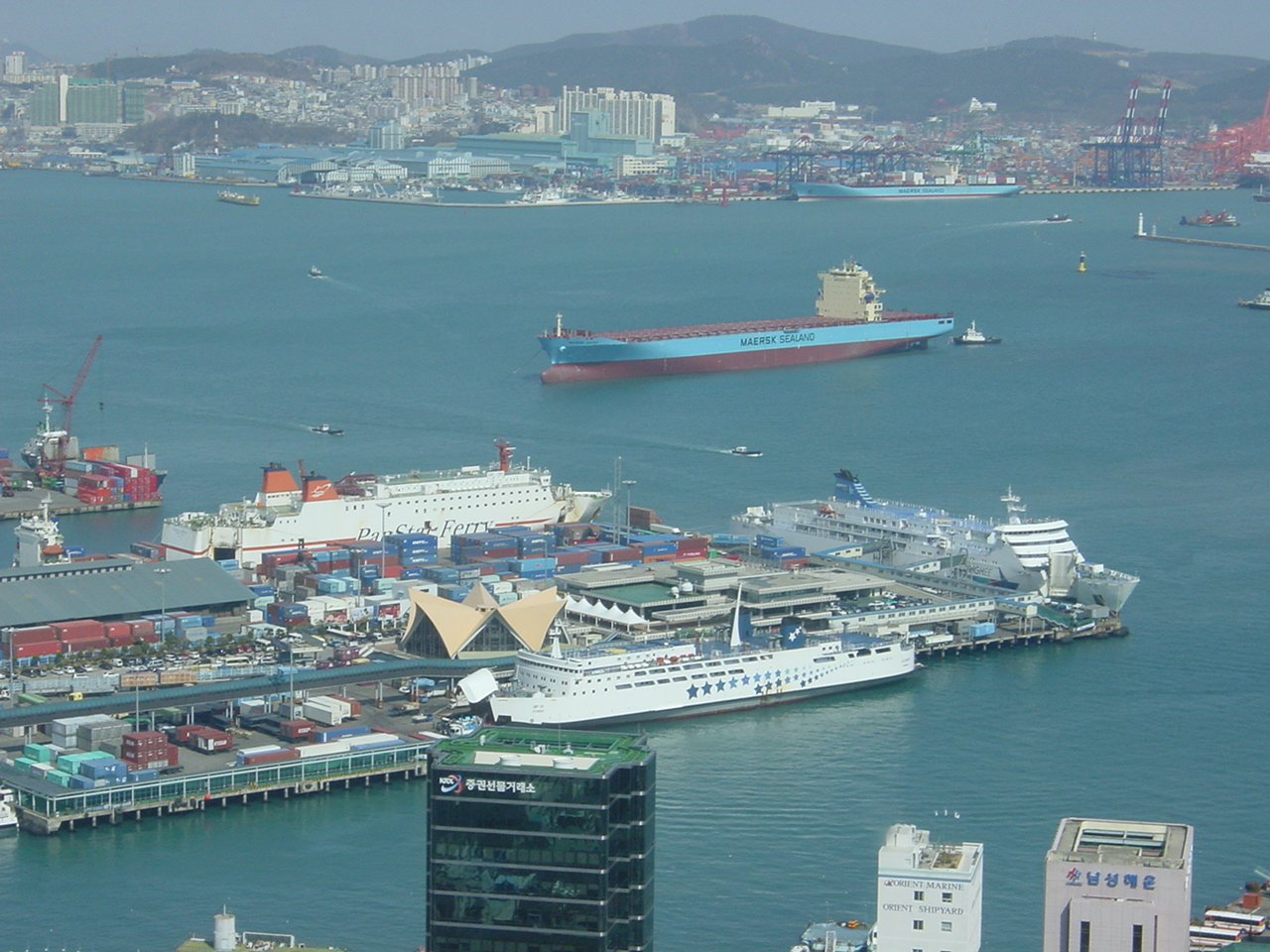
- Interactive map of Port of Busan; Korean: 부산항; Hanja: 釜山港

Location
- Country: South Korea
- Location: Busan
- Coordinates: 35°06′14″N 129°04′44″E
- UN/LOCODE: KRPUS

Details
- Opened: 27 February 1876

Statistics
- Website www.busanpa.com

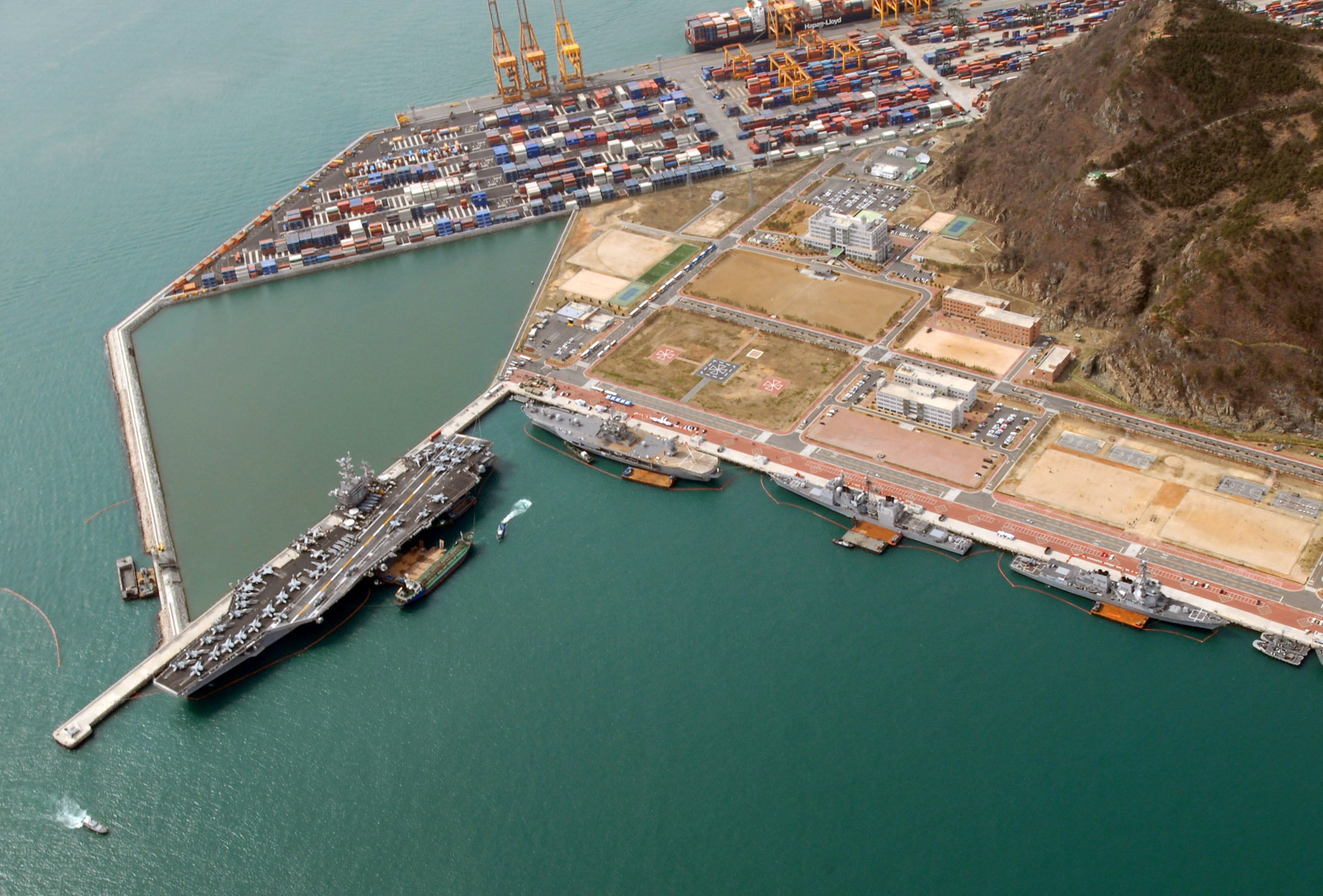
Part of port of Busan container terminal and the Naval base Oryuk-Do

The port of Busan is the largest and busiest port in South Korea, located in the city of Busan. Its location is known as Busan Harbour. (Note: In the 19th century, Busan Harbour was known in English sources as Chosan Harbour.) Busan handled over three-quarters of Korea's container shipping in 2022, and by 2023 it was the sixth-busiest port in the world. In 2024, Busan port handled 24.4 million TEUs, its busiest year on record. The port is subdivided into two parts, Busan North Port and Busan New Port; the latter is known for its high level of automation.

== History ==
The port of Busan was established in 1876 as a small port with strict trading between Korea, China and Japan. It is situated at the mouth of the Nakdong River (낙동강) facing the Tsushima Island of Japan. During the Korean War (1950-1953), Busan was among the few places North Korea did not invade, causing war refugees to flee to the city of Busan. At that time Busan's port was crucial to receive war materials and aid, such as fabrics and processed foods to keep the economy stable. In the 1970s, a rise in the footwear and veneer industries caused factory workers to migrate to Busan, bringing Busan's population from 1.8 million to 3 million.

The port of Busan continued to grow and by 2003 the port was the fourth largest container port in the world. South Korea accounted for 0.7% of global trade in 1970, but by 2003 it went up to 2.5%. 50% of the Busan's manufacturing jobs are related to exports, and 83% of the country's exports are containerised, making Busan the country's largest container and general cargo port. Compared to the port of Busan, Inchon port handles only 7% of containers. Easy access to the port of Busan between Japan, Singapore, and Hong Kong contribute to its vast growth.

Currently the port of Busan is the fifth busiest container port in the world. It is developed, managed, and operated by the Busan Port Authority (BPA) established in 2004. Today the port of Busan consists of four ports- North Port, South Port, Gamcheon Port, and Dadaepo Port, an International Passenger Terminal and the Gamman container terminal. The North Port provides passenger handling facilities and cargo, and with Gamcheon Port's help more cargo volumes can be handled (Ship Technology). The South Port is home to the Busan Cooperative Fish Market which is the largest fishing base in Korea, and it handles 30% of the total marine volume. The Dadaepo Port located west of the Busan Port, mainly handles coastal catches.

In 2007 the Busan Port handled cargo containing fertilisers, meat, scrap metal, petroleum and other gases, crude petroleum, coal, leather, fats and oils, iron ore, rough wood, natural sand, milling industry products, grains and sugar. In 2016, South Korea exported a total of $515B and imported $398B. Top exports of South Korea are integrated circuits, cars, refined petroleum, passenger and cargo ships, and vehicle parts. South Korea exports the most to China, the United States, Vietnam, Hong Kong, and Japan. Imports to South Korea mainly come from China, Japan, the United States, Germany, and other Asian countries. In 2017 Busan processed more than 20 million TEU, twenty-foot equivalents (a measure used to estimate the capacity of container ships).

The port is part of the Maritime Silk Road that runs from the Chinese coast towards the southern tip of India to Mombasa, from there through the Suez Canal to the Mediterranean and there to the Upper Adriatic region of Trieste with its rail connections to Central and Eastern Europe.

The current traffic volumes and urban population categorise Busan as a Large-Port Metropolis, using the Southampton system of port-city classification.

== Port Statistics ==
Busan Port Container Throughput
| Year | Container Throughput (TEU) |
|---|---|
| 2010 | 14,194,240 |
| 2011 | 16,184,599 |
| 2012 | 17,046,177 |
| 2013 | 17,686,099 |
| 2014 | 18,683,283 |
| 2015 | 19,468,725 |
| 2016 | 19,456,291 |
| 2017 | 20,493,475 |
| 2018 | 21,662,572 |
| 2019 | 21,992,000 |
| 2020 | 21,823,995 |
| 2021 | 22,710,000 |

== Incidents ==
In 2021, a big cargo ship hit a number of cranes as it was parking. There were no injuries or deaths.

== Sister ports ==
The Port of Busan also has 6 sister ports (listed in order of dates).

- – Port of Southampton, United Kingdom (1978)
- – Port of Seattle, United States (1981)
- – Port of Osaka, Japan (1985)
- – Port of Rotterdam, Netherlands (1985)
- (United States) – Port of New York & New Jersey, USA (1988)
- – Port of Shanghai, China (1994)
- - Bandar Abbas, Iran
