= Visa policy of mainland China =

Policy on permits required to enter mainland China

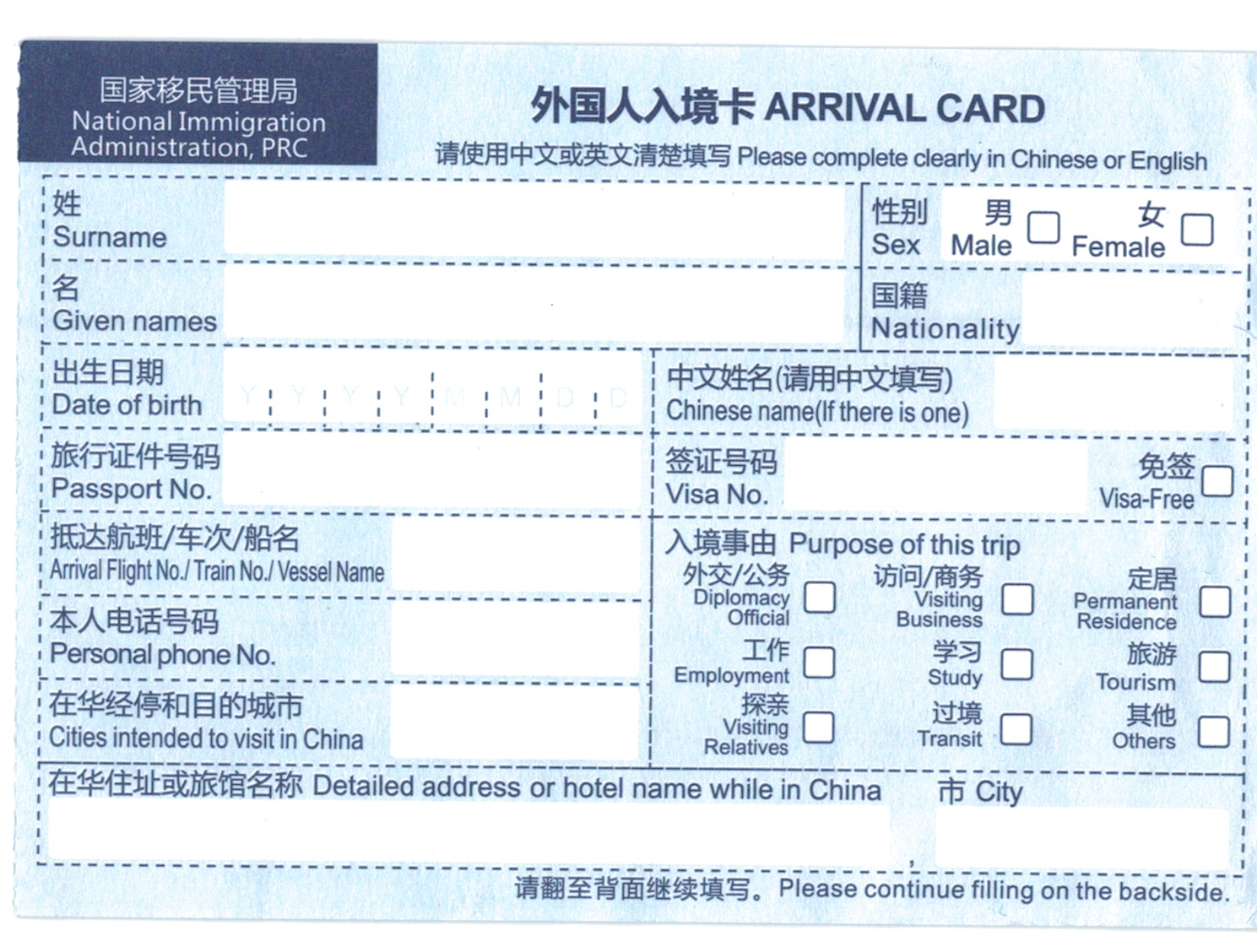
Arrival Card for non-Chinese travel document holders (can also be completed online)

The visa policy of mainland China sets out the conditions that a foreign citizen must satisfy in order to travel to, enter, and remain in the mainland of the People's Republic of China. Several categories of visas are available, depending on the purpose and length of stay. Chinese visas are issued outside China by Chinese diplomatic missions, and within China by the exit and entry administrations (EEAs) of county-level public security bureaus (PSBs) under the guidance of the National Immigration Administration. Visa exemptions exist for citizens of certain countries, based on bilateral agreements and unilateral decisions.

Hong Kong, Macau and Taiwan maintain independent visa policies, so foreign nationals traveling to these regions must apply for separate visas if not exempt. As the PRC government claim all three regions as inalienable territories of China under the One China principle, permanent residents of Hong Kong and Macau and citizens of Taiwan may only travel to mainland China with a Mainland Travel Permit, rather than a passport or visa.

For the purposes of this policy, traveling to one of these regions is counted as exiting mainland China, and foreigners will pass through customs and immigration and receive an exit stamp when departing for these regions. When re-entering mainland China from one of these regions, a foreigner whose visa entries have been exhausted must obtain a new visa, and those with multiple-entry visas or visa-free privileges will have their entry date and stay duration reset, and their passport will receive a fresh entry stamp.

== Visa exemption ==
=== Ordinary passports ===
Visa policy of China Mainland China Mainland Travel Permit required (unlimited period) Visa not required (90 days) Visa not required (60 days) Visa not required (30 days) Visa not required for transit to a third country/territory (10 days), or for stays in Hainan (30 days); otherwise, visa required Visa not required for transit to a third country/territory (24 hours), or for stays in Hainan (30 days); otherwise, visa required Visa required in general, except for transit to a third country/ territory (24 hours).

Holders of ordinary passports of the following countries may travel to China without a visa as long as their visit does not last longer than the visa-free period listed below, unless they are allowed to extend their stay:

Permanent regime:

90 days

- Albania^{1}
- Armenia^{1}
- Bosnia and Herzegovina^{1}
- San Marino

60 days

- Mauritius

30 days

- Antigua and Barbuda^{1}
- Azerbaijan^{1}
- Bahamas
- Barbados
- Belarus^{2}
- Brunei
- Dominica
- Ecuador (Note: While Ecuador has suspended the mutual visa exemption agreement unilaterally, it is still honored by the Chinese authorities at present.)
- Fiji
- Georgia^{1}
- Grenada
- Kazakhstan^{1}
- Maldives
- Malaysia^{1}
- Mongolia (Note: For holders of passports with series "E" or "PE".)
- Qatar
- Serbia
- Samoa^{1}
- Solomon Islands^{1}
- Seychelles
- Singapore
- Suriname
- Thailand^{1}
- Tonga
- United Arab Emirates
- Uzbekistan^{1}

Temporary regime (until 31 December 2026):

30 days

- European Union member states (except the Czech Republic and Lithuania)

- Andorra
- Argentina
- Australia
- Bahrain
- Brazil
- Canada
- Chile
- Iceland
- Japan
- Kuwait
- Liechtenstein
- Monaco
- Montenegro
- New Zealand
- Norway
- North Macedonia
- Oman
- Peru
- Saudi Arabia
- South Korea
- Switzerland
- United Kingdom (Note: For British citizens only.)
- Uruguay

Temporary regime (until 31 December 2027):

30 days

- Russia

_{1 - No more than 90 days within any 180-day period.}
_{2 - No more than 90 days within a calendar year.}

Date of visa changes
- 22 July 1985: San Marino (90 days)
- 1 July 2003: Brunei, Singapore (unilateral, 15 days; suspended Singapore from 1 July to 19 September 2008; suspended both from 28 March 2020 to 26 July 2023)
- 1 September 2003: Japan (unilateral, 15 days; suspended from 28 March 2020 to 30 November 2024)
- 26 June 2013: Seychelles
- 31 October 2013: Mauritius
- 12 February 2014: Bahamas
- 14 March 2015: Fiji
- 10 June 2015: Grenada
- 18 August 2016: Ecuador (Temporarily suspended unilaterally by Ecuador)
- 19 August 2016: Tonga
- 15 January 2017: Serbia
- 1 June 2017: Barbados
- 14 June 2017: Mauritius (extension to 60 days)
- 16 January 2018: United Arab Emirates
- 29 May 2018: Bosnia and Herzegovina (90 days)
- 10 August 2018: Belarus
- 21 December 2018: Qatar
- 19 January 2020: Armenia (90 days)
- 1 May 2021: Suriname
- 19 September 2022: Dominica
- 17 February 2023: Maldives
- 18 March 2023: Albania (90 days)
- 10 November 2023: Kazakhstan
- 1 December 2023: France, Germany, Italy, Malaysia, Netherlands, Spain (unilateral, 15 days)
- 9 February 2024: Singapore (bilateral, 30 days)
- 1 March 2024: Thailand
- 14 March 2024: Austria, Belgium, Hungary, Ireland, Luxembourg, Switzerland (unilateral, 15 days)
- 11 May 2024: Antigua and Barbuda
- 28 May 2024: Georgia
- 1 July 2024: Australia, New Zealand, Poland (unilateral, 15 days)
- 15 October 2024: Cyprus, Greece, Portugal, Slovenia (unilateral, 15 days)
- 8 November 2024: Andorra, Denmark, Finland, Iceland, Liechtenstein, Monaco, Norway, Slovakia, South Korea (unilateral, 15 days)
- 30 November 2024: Bulgaria, Croatia, Estonia, Japan, Latvia, Malta, Montenegro, North Macedonia, Romania (unilateral, 30 days); all other unilateral waivers also extended to 30 days
- 28 December 2024: Solomon Islands
- 2 April 2025: Samoa
- 1 June 2025: Uzbekistan (bilateral); Argentina, Brazil, Chile, Peru and Uruguay (unilateral)
- 9 June 2025: Saudi Arabia, Oman, Kuwait, Bahrain (unilateral)
- 16 July 2025: Azerbaijan
- 17 July 2025: Malaysia (bilateral)
- 15 September 2025: Russia (unilateral)
- 10 November 2025: Sweden (unilateral)
- 17 February 2026: Canada, the United Kingdom (unilateral)

==== Future changes ====
China has signed visa exemption agreements with the following countries, but they are not yet in force:

Country	Duration of stay	Visa exemption agreement signed on
Oman	TBA	29 March 2021

=== Non-ordinary passports ===
Passports for public affairs

Mainland China Mainland Travel Permit Visa not required for holders of ordinary passports Visa not required for holders of passports endorsed "for public affairs" Visa required

Holders of passports of the following countries endorsed "for public affairs" may travel to China without a visa:

Albania^{*}; Armenia^{*}; Azerbaijan^{*}; Bangladesh; Benin; Bolivia; Burundi; Comoros; Congo; Djibouti; Dominica^{*}; Eritrea; Ethiopia; Fiji^{*}; Gabon	Georgia^{*}; Grenada^{*}; Guinea; Iraq; Ivory Coast; Laos; Mali; Mauritania; Mauritius^{*}; Moldova; Mongolia; Nigeria; North Korea^{1}; North Macedonia^{*}	Pakistan; Russia^{* 2}; Senegal; Serbia^{*}; Seychelles^{*}; Singapore^{*}; Suriname^{*}; Tajikistan; Togo; Timor-Leste; Turkmenistan; United Arab Emirates^{*}; Venezuela; Vietnam^{3}

_{* – Visa exemption also for holders of ordinary passports.}
_{1 – Visa exemption applies to both "Passport For Public Affairs" and "Passport For Official Trip". Visa exemption also applies to collective passports for public affairs.}
_{2 – For seafarers and crew members.}
_{3 – Visa exemption applies to both "Passport For Public Affairs" and any normal passport that contains an 'AB stamp', for a maximum stay of 90 days.}

Diplomatic, official/service and special passports

Visa policy of China for holders of diplomatic and service category passports Mainland China Visa not required for holders of diplomatic, official/service and special passports Visa not required for holders of diplomatic, official or service passports Visa not required for holders of diplomatic or special passports Visa not required for holders of diplomatic passports Visa required

Under reciprocal agreements, holders of diplomatic, official, service, consular, special passports or laissez-passers of the following countries may travel to China without a visa for stays of up to 30 days (unless otherwise noted):

- ASEAN member states^{D O/S}
- European Union member states not listed below^{D LP 1}
- Afghanistan^{D}
- Albania^{D S 1}
- Algeria^{D S}
- Angola^{D S}
- Antigua and Barbuda^{D O 1}
- Argentina^{D O}
- Armenia^{D S 1}
- Azerbaijan^{D S}
- Bahamas^{D O}
- Bahrain^{D Sp 2}
- Bangladesh^{D O}
- Barbados^{D O}
- Belarus^{D S}
- Benin^{D S}
- Bolivia^{D O}
- Bosnia and Herzegovina^{D S}
- Botswana^{D O S}
- Brazil^{D O}
- Bulgaria^{D S LP}
- Burkina Faso^{D S 3}
- Burundi^{D S}
- Cameroon^{D S}
- Cape Verde^{D S}
- Chad^{D S}
- Chile^{D O}
- Colombia^{D O}
- Comoros^{D S}
- Republic of the Congo^{D S}
- Costa Rica^{D S}
- Croatia^{D O LP}
- Cuba^{D O S}
- Cyprus^{D S LP}
- Djibouti^{D S 2}
- Dominica^{D O S}
- Dominican Republic^{D S}
- Ecuador^{D O Sp}
- Egypt^{D Sp}
- El Salvador^{D O}
- Equatorial Guinea^{D O Sp}
- Eritrea^{D S 3}
- Ethiopia^{D S}
- Fiji^{D S}
- Gabon^{D S}
- Gambia^{D O}
- Georgia^{D S}
- Ghana^{D S}
- Grenada^{D O}
- Guinea^{D S}
- Guyana^{D O}
- Honduras^{D O S}
- Hungary^{D S LP}
- Iceland^{D}
- Iran^{D S}
- Iraq^{D S Sp}
- Ireland^{D O 4}
- Israel^{D S}
- Ivory Coast^{D S}
- Jamaica^{D O}
- Jordan^{D S Sp 1}
- Kazakhstan^{D S}
- Kenya^{D O}
- Kuwait^{D Sp}
- Kyrgyzstan^{D S}
- Lesotho^{D O}
- Liberia^{D}
- Lebanon^{D S Sp}
- Lithuania^{D S LP}
- Madagascar^{D S}
- Maldives^{D O S}
- Mali^{D S 3}
- Malta^{D S LP}
- Mauritania^{D S}
- Mauritius^{D S}
- Mexico^{D O}
- Micronesia^{D O}
- Moldova^{D S}
- Mongolia^{D S}
- Montenegro^{D S}
- Morocco^{D S Sp 3}
- Mozambique^{D S}
- Nauru^{D O}
- Nepal^{D O}
- Nicaragua^{D O}
- Niger^{D S}
- Nigeria^{D S}
- North Korea^{D S}
- North Macedonia^{D S}
- Norway^{D 1}
- Oman^{D S Sp}
- Pakistan^{D O}
- Palestine^{D}
- Panama^{D S C}
- Papua New Guinea^{D S}
- Peru^{D Sp}
- Poland^{D S LP}
- Qatar^{D S Sp}
- Romania^{D S LP}
- Russia^{D S}
- Rwanda^{D S}
- Samoa^{D O}
- San Marino^{D S 2}
- São Tomé and Príncipe^{D S Sp}
- Saudi Arabia^{D S Sp}
- Senegal^{D S}
- Serbia^{D S}
- Seychelles^{D S}
- Sierra Leone^{D S}
- Slovakia^{D S Sp LP}
- Slovenia^{D S LP}
- Solomon Islands^{D O}
- South Africa^{D S}
- South Korea^{D O}
- South Sudan^{D Sp}
- Sri Lanka^{D O}
- Sudan^{D O Sp}
- Suriname^{D S}
- Switzerland^{D 2}
- Tajikistan^{D S}
- Tanzania^{D S}
- Timor-Leste^{D S}
- Togo^{D S}
- Tonga^{D O}
- Trinidad and Tobago^{D O}
- Tunisia^{D Sp}
- Turkey^{D S Sp}
- Turkmenistan^{D S}
- Ukraine^{D S}
- United Arab Emirates^{D S}
- United Kingdom^{D O 4}
- Uruguay^{D S}
- Uzbekistan^{D}
- Vanuatu^{D S}
- Venezuela^{D S}
- Zimbabwe^{D S}

_{D – Diplomatic passports}
_{O – Official passports}
_{S – Service passports}
_{C – Consular passports}
_{Sp – Special passports}
_{LP – Laissez-passers}
_{1 – 90 days within any 180-day period (unless otherwise noted).}
_{2 – 90 days}
_{3 – 60 days}
_{4 – Visa exemption for holders of official passports only when accompanying a government minister on an official visit.}

== Other visa exemption ==
=== Tour groups ===
Holders of ordinary passports of the following countries do not need a visa for China when traveling in tour groups organized by authorized travel agencies:

30 days

- Moldova
- Turkmenistan

=== Seafarers and crew members ===
Holders of seafarer passports and crew member certificates of the following countries may travel to China without a visa:

- Poland^{*}
- Russia^{* 1}
- Ukraine

_{* – Visa exemption also for holders of ordinary passports}
_{1 – Only when serving on board for public affairs}

=== APEC Business Travel Card ===
Holders of passports issued by the following countries who possess an APEC Business Travel Card (ABTC) containing the code "CHN" on the back of the card may enter China without a visa for business trips for up to 90 days.

ABTCs are issued to citizens of:

Australia^{*}; Brunei^{*}; Chile^{*}; Indonesia; Japan^{*}; South Korea^{*}; Malaysia^{*}; Mexico	New Zealand^{*}; Papua New Guinea; Peru^{*}; Philippines; Russia^{*}; Singapore^{*}; Thailand^{*}; Vietnam

_{* - Visa-exempt in general.}

ABTCs are also issued to permanent residents of Hong Kong, however permanent residents with Chinese nationality are required to use their Mainland Travel Permit for Hong Kong and Macao Resident instead. Only holders of non-Chinese passports can use the card to enter mainland China.

Similarly, although Taiwan is a member of this program, its citizens are also not allowed to use ABTCs to enter mainland China. They are instead required to use their Mainland Travel Permit for Taiwan Resident.

== Visa-free transit ==
There are two types of transit-without-visa (TWOV) programs in mainland China: the 24-hour TWOV, available to passengers of most nationalities at most ports of entry, especially for airside transit; and the 240-hour (10 days) TWOV, available for certain nationalities and only through designated ports of entry.

The TWOV policy requires travelers to be in transit to a country or region different from their departure point. For example, passengers traveling between U.S. territories and the contiguous United States, Alaska, or Hawaii are ineligible unless one of their flights stops in another country or region. Hong Kong, Macau, and Taiwan are considered as third regions under China’s One Country, Two Systems regime, and thus eligible under this policy.

=== 240-hour visa-free transit (10 days) ===
China permits 240‑hour visa‑free transit for citizens of 57 countries who enter and exit via eligible ports and continue to a third country or territory within 240 hours. The arrival and onward destinations must be different.

Hong Kong, Macao, and Taiwan are treated as separate destinations. It is therefore permitted to transit between Hong Kong, Macao, and Taiwan via Mainland China under this policy.

Cross-mode transit (air, rail, sea, land), inter-provincial travel within the 24 eligible provinces and direct-administered municipalities (Beijing, Tianjin, Shanghai, Chongqing), and departing from a different port than the port of entry, are permitted. The calculation of the 240‑hour period begins at 00:00 on the day after arrival, so in practice the authorized stay may be longer than 240 hours.

To use the policy, travelers must enter and depart mainland China through eligible ports, hold a passport valid for at least three months after arrival, and have an onward ticket or required visa for their next destination. For air departures, travelers must show a confirmed ticket leaving within 240 hours (10 days). For land or rail departures, proof of onward travel or booking may be required.

Inbound and outbound transportation must arrive at and depart directly from any eligible port of entry. Traveling to and from a U.S. territory (such as Guam) doesn't qualify unless a flight includes a third country or Hong Kong/Macao/Taiwan stopover.

Eligible travelers receive a temporary entry permit indicating conditions of stay such as the stay duration. The stay duration typically begins at 00:00 the day after arrival, with exceptions for some ports. Valid Chinese visa holders and visa exempt passengers can also select to enter under this scheme.

Ineligible individuals include those with short-validity passports (less than 3 months left, or less than the passport validity required for entry into a third country or region), Chinese visa refusal stamps, past immigration or local law violations, failure to register with local authorities, or inadmissibility under Chinese law. Ship crews are also excluded (they benefit from a separate policy). Working illegally, overstaying, or cancelling original ticket without justifications may result in a five-year ban from visa-free transit.

==== Eligible countries ====
- European Union member states^{*}
- Albania^{*}
- Argentina^{*}
- Australia^{*}
- Belarus^{*}
- Bosnia and Herzegovina^{*}
- Brazil^{*}
- Brunei^{*}
- Canada^{*}
- Chile^{*}
- Iceland^{*}
- Indonesia
- Japan^{*}
- Kyrgyzstan
- Mexico
- Monaco^{*}
- Montenegro^{*}
- New Zealand^{*}
- North Macedonia^{*}
- Norway^{*}
- Qatar^{*}
- Russia^{*}
- Serbia^{*}
- Singapore^{*}
- South Korea^{*}
- Switzerland^{*}
- Ukraine
- United Arab Emirates^{*}
- United Kingdom^{*}^{1}
- United States
- Vietnam

_{* – Visa-exempt in general (except citizens of the Czech Republic and Lithuania, who are visa-exempt only for transit).}
_{1 – For British citizens only.}

==== Eligible ports ====
240-hour visa-free transit allows arrival and departure (Note: Exits available at all open ports across Guangdong province) through the following border crossing ports:

Airports (47)

- Beihai
- Beijing – Capital
- Beijing – Daxing
- Changsha
- Chengdu – Shuangliu
- Chengdu – Tianfu
- Chongqing
- Dalian
- Fuzhou
- Guangzhou
- Guilin
- Guiyang
- Haikou
- Hangzhou
- Harbin
- Hefei
- Huangshan
- Jinan
- Jieyang
- Kunming
- Lijiang
- Nanchang
- Nanjing
- Nanning
- Ningbo
- Qingdao
- Quanzhou
- Sanya
- Shanghai – Hongqiao
- Shanghai – Pudong
- Shenyang
- Shenzhen
- Shijiazhuang
- Taiyuan
- Tianjin
- Weihai
- Wenzhou
- Wuhan
- Wuxi
- Wuyishan
- Xiamen
- Xi'an
- Yangzhou
- Yantai
- Yiwu
- Zhangjiajie
- Zhengzhou

Seaports (14)

- Beihai
- Dalian
- Lianyungang
- Nansha
- Pazhou
- Qinhuangdao
- Qingdao
- Shanghai
- Shekou
- Tianjin
- Wenzhou
- Xiamen
- Zhongshan
- Zhoushan

Railways (2)

- Mohan railway station – Laos side: Boten
- West Kowloon station – Hong Kong side: West Kowloon

Land (2)

- Hengqin – Macau side: Hengqin
- HZMB Zhuhai Port – Hong Kong and Macau side: HZMB Hong Kong Port/Macau Port

==== Eligible areas to stay ====
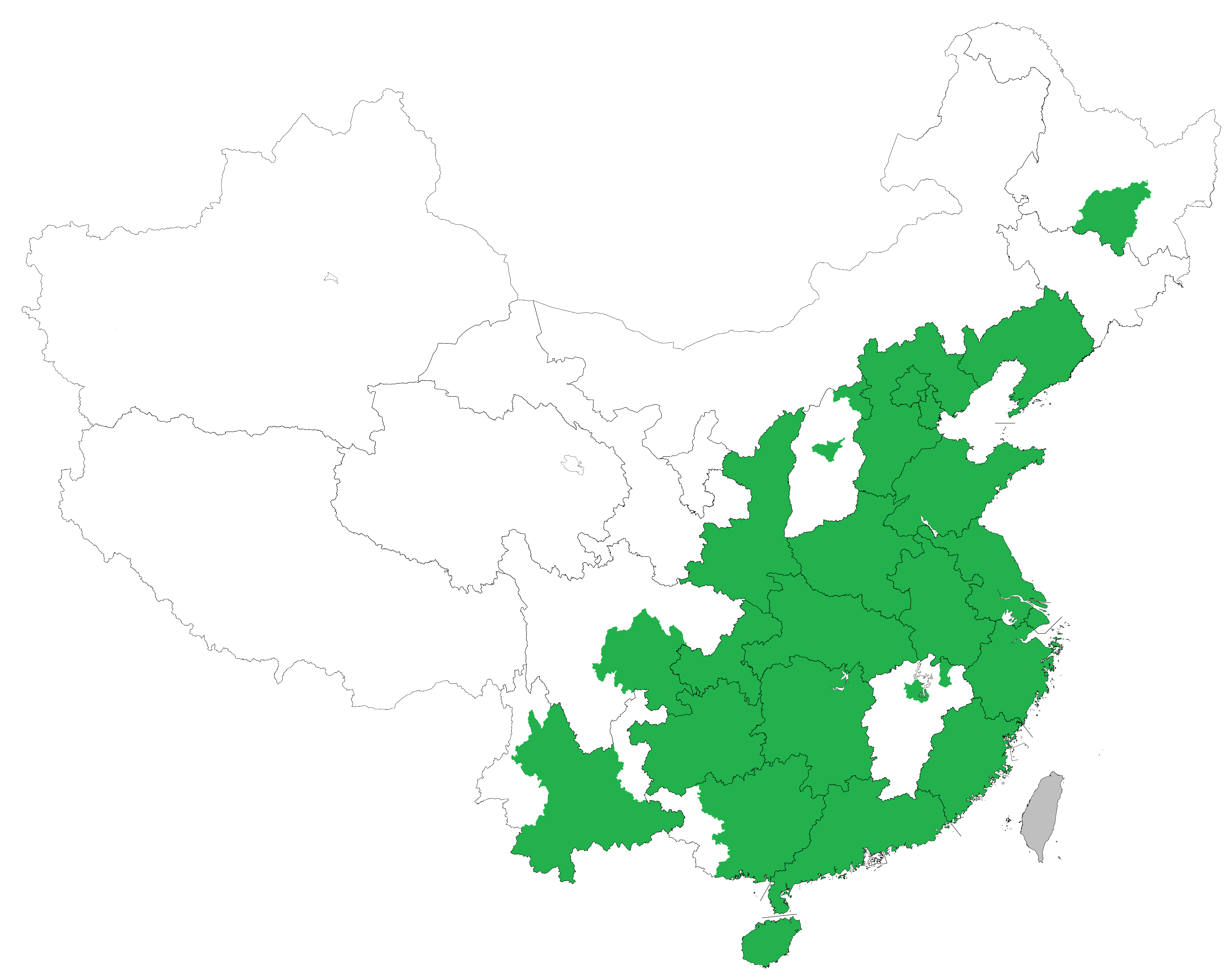
The colored parts are eligible areas for 240-hour visa-free transit policy travelers stay in China

Different from the previous policy, foreign nationals entering China through the visa-free transit policy can make cross-province travels within the eligible areas for visa-free transit travelers in these following areas:

- Beijing Municipality
- Tianjin Municipality
- Hebei Province
- Shanxi Province (Taiyuan and Datong)
- Liaoning Province
- Heilongjiang Province (Harbin)
- Shanghai Municipality
- Jiangsu Province
- Zhejiang Province
- Anhui Province
- Fujian Province
- Jiangxi Province (Nanchang and Jingdezhen)
- Shandong Province
- Henan Province
- Hubei Province
- Hunan Province
- Chongqing Municipality
- Sichuan Province (Chengdu, Leshan, Deyang, Suining, Meishan, Ya'an, Ziyang, Neijiang, Zigong, Luzhou, Yibin)
- Shaanxi Province
- Guizhou Province
- Yunnan Province (Kunming, Lijiang, Yuxi, Pu'er, Chuxiong, Dali, Honghe, Wenshan, Xishuangbanna)
- Guangdong Province (Exits available at all open ports across the Province)
- Guangxi Zhuang Autonomous Region (Nanning, Liuzhou, Guilin, Wuzhou, Beihai, Fangchenggang, Qinzhou, Guigang, Yulin, Hezhou, Hechi, Laibin)
- Hainan Province

=== 24-hour Transit Without a Visa ===
As of 2024, China's 24-hour Transit Without a Visa (TWOV) policy allows eligible travelers to enter mainland China without a visa for up to 24 hours via any of its international port of entry, if entered by air, cruise ships, or rail. (Vehicle, bus, pedestrian, and ferry entries are not eligible under the policy.) Almost all nationalities are eligible, with some exceptions at certain ports of entry.

To qualify for the 24-hour TWOV, travelers must possess a passport valid for at least 3 months from the date of entry, and arrive by air, cruise ship, or train, and have confirmed onward tickets to a third-country destination outside mainland China departing within 24 hours. Standby tickets are not permitted.

The policy allows for multiple stops within mainland China at most airports, provided the traveler departs the country within the 24-hour window.

Since January 2018, additional restrictions have been implemented. Travelers may be refused entry or multi-stop transit if they have Chinese visa refusal stamps in their passports, have violated Chinese immigration or other laws in the past five years, failed to register with local Public Security Bureaus within 24 hours of entry in the last two years, or are otherwise inadmissible under Chinese laws and regulations.

Unlike transit rules in other countries, travelers in China may be required to go through immigration and customs even if they do not intend to leave the sterile transit area. However, the National Immigration Administration allows foreigners to transit directly for 24 hours without inspection procedures at those following key hub airports:

Beijing - Capital; Beijing - Daxing; Chengdu - Tianfu; Chongqing; Dalian; Fuzhou; Guangzhou; Haikou; Hangzhou; Kunming	Nanjing; Nanning; Qingdao; Shanghai - Pudong; Shenzhen; Tianjin; Wuhan; Xiamen; Xi'an

International travelers with connecting flights within 24 hours and holding tickets to a third country or region can transit through these airports without a visa and are exempt from border inspection procedures.

While the 24-hour TWOV is available to most nationalities, some individual airports may impose their own restrictions on certain nationalities. This policy differs from the 240-hour TWOV, which has more specific eligibility requirements.

==== Airport-specific restrictions ====
While the majority of Chinese international airports implement the 24-hour Transit Without Visa (TWOV) program without additional requirements, certain airports have imposed their own restrictions as mandated by local authorities.

- Two airports have opted out of the TWOV program entirely. These are Huangshan Tunxi International Airport and Mudanjiang Hailang International Airport. At these locations, all transit passengers require a visa unless they are of a visa-exempt nationality.
- Ürümqi Tianshan International Airport has implemented specific restrictions for transit passengers. Travelers are permitted to remain in the airport for a maximum of two hours, after which they must depart mainland China from Ürümqi on an international flight. Multi-stop transit is not allowed at this airport. Additionally, Ürümqi Tianshan International Airport maintains its own list of nationalities that are not eligible for visa-free transit.

Citizens of the following countries are not eligible for 24-hour TWOV in Ürümqi Tianshan International Airport:

Afghanistan; Iran; Iraq; Kyrgyzstan; Nigeria	Pakistan; Sri Lanka; Syria; Turkey; Yemen

- Citizens of the following countries are not eligible for visa exemption transit in Xiamen International Airport:

Afghanistan; Iran; Iraq; Pakistan; Sri Lanka	Syria; Turkey; Turkmenistan; Yemen

- Syrian citizens are not eligible for visa exemption transit in Guangzhou Baiyun International Airport.

==== Passport-specific restrictions ====
Holders of ROC (Taiwan) passport are not eligible for 24-hour TWOV in most airports, and are required to hold Mainland Travel Permit for Taiwan Residents (can be obtained on arrival at major airports) or identity documents that are accepted by the Mainland Chinese authorities for the purpose of entering Mainland China:

The restriction does not apply to holders of these passports who also hold Chinese Travel Documents.

== Region-specific preferential visa policy ==
The Chinese government has implemented visa waiver schemes or special visa regulations for foreign citizens traveling to particular areas of mainland China or foreign nationals residing in certain regions bordering mainland China.

=== Hainan Visa-free Program ===
==== Personal Visa-free Program ====
In 2010, China introduced a visa-free policy for citizens of 26 countries visiting Hainan, allowing stays of up to 15 days in tour groups organized by qualified travel agencies. On 18 March 2018, the policy was expanded to 59 countries, effective 1 May 2018, permitting visa-free stays of up to 30 days without the tour group requirement. The requirement to select a travel agency and inform it of the itinerary has been removed since July 2019.

In July 2019, the Ministry of Public Security and National Immigration Administration further expanded the visa-free entry options for foreign nationals in Hainan. Besides tourism, foreign citizens could now enter visa-free for various purposes, including business, trade, visiting, family reunification, medical treatment, conferences and exhibitions, and sports competitions (excluding work and study) for up to 30 days.

==== Eligible countries ====
- European Union member states^{*}
- Albania^{*}
- Argentina^{*}
- Australia^{*}
- Belarus^{*}
- Bosnia and Herzegovina^{*}
- Brazil^{*}
- Brunei^{*}
- Canada^{*}
- Chile^{*}
- Iceland^{*}
- Indonesia
- Japan^{*}
- Kazakhstan^{*}
- Kyrgyzstan
- Malaysia^{*}
- Mexico
- Monaco^{*}
- Montenegro^{*}
- New Zealand^{*}
- North Macedonia^{*}
- Norway^{*}
- Philippines
- Qatar^{*}
- Russia^{*}
- Serbia^{*}
- Singapore^{*}
- South Korea^{*}
- Switzerland^{*}
- Thailand^{*}
- Ukraine
- United Arab Emirates^{*}
- United Kingdom^{*}^{1}
- United States
- Vietnam

_{* – Visa-exempt in general (except nationals of the Czech Republic and Lithuania, who are visa-exempt only for Hainan).}
_{1 – For British citizens only.}

==== Tour Group Visa-free Program ====
Since 30 July 2024, foreign tour groups of two or more people from Hong Kong and Macau can entry Hainan Province without a visa for up to 144 hours (6 days).

=== Cruise ship visitors ===
Non visa-exempt citizens traveling with tour groups on cruise ships may enter China without a visa for a maximum stay of 15 days since 1 October 2016 (duration of stay starts from the next day of arrival). To be eligible, they must:

- travel as a part of an approved tour group with a minimum of 2 people;
- enter via a cruise terminal in Shanghai.

Approved groups must travel with the cruise ship within the entire duration of their trip, and can only visit the following provincial-level municipalities, provinces and autonomous regions on the trip:

- Beijing
- Fujian
- Guangdong
- Guangxi
- Hainan
- Hebei
- Jiangsu
- Liaoning
- Shandong
- Shanghai
- Tianjin
- Zhejiang

Visitors utilizing this policy will not have their passports stamped and do not need to complete arrival cards or departure cards.

Passengers who boarded the cruise without joining a tour group may apply to join an existing group provided the travel agency relays the information to the Chinese authorities and receives approval before the ship's arrival. In addition, 24-hour and 144-hour TWOV policies apply to those who are not joining a tour group and are leaving China by air, train or sea in 24 or 144 hours depending on their nationality.

Since 15 May 2024, China's visa-exempt policy for cruise ship visitors is expanded. Non visa-exempt citizens traveling with tour groups on cruise ships may enter via all cruise ship ports along China's coastline, including Tianjin, Dalian, Lianyungang, Shanghai, Zhoushan, Wenzhou, Xiamen, Qingdao, Guangzhou, Shenzhen, Beihai, Haikou and Sanya. Visitors can visit all regions of coastal provinces, municipalities and autonomous regions and Beijing, for a maximum stay of 15 days.

=== Visa-free for ASEAN tour groups to Guilin and Xishuangbanna ===
Tourists from ASEAN member states may visit Guilin, Guangxi or Xishuangbanna, Yunnan without a visa for a maximum of 6 days if they travel with an approved tour group and enter and exit China through Guilin Liangjiang International Airport or Xishuangbanna Gasa International Airport, Mohan Railway Port and Mohan Highway Port. They may not visit other parts of mainland China.

- Brunei^{*}
- Cambodia
- Indonesia
- Laos
- Malaysia^{*}
- Myanmar
- Philippines
- Singapore^{*}
- Thailand^{*}
- Vietnam

_{* - Visa-exempt in general.}

=== Visa-free for tour groups to Pearl River Delta from Special Administrative Regions ===
All visitors to Hong Kong or Macau are able to visit the surrounding Pearl River Delta without a visa as long as the following conditions are met:

- The visitor is a citizen of a country which has diplomatic relations with the People's Republic of China
- The visitor is visiting the Pearl River Delta as part of a tour group organised by a travel agency based in Hong Kong or Macau
- The stay is for 6 days or less
- The visitor stays only within the cities of Guangzhou, Shenzhen, Zhuhai, Foshan, Dongguan, Zhongshan, Jiangmen, Zhaoqing, Huizhou, and Shantou.

=== Special Economic Zone visa on arrival ===
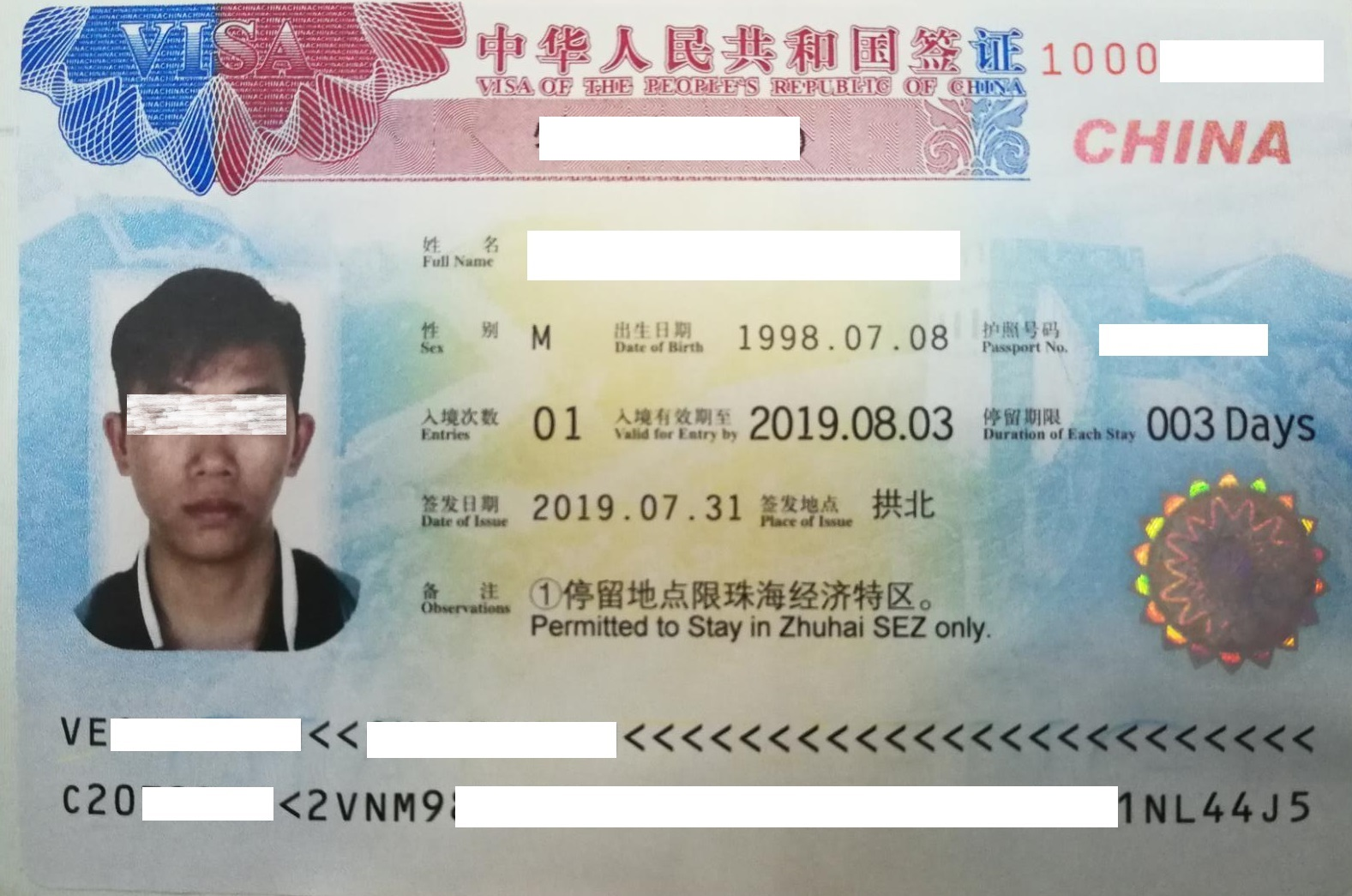
Sample of a SEZ visa

Visitors from most countries may obtain an entry visa when traveling to and staying solely in three of China's special economic zones: Shenzhen, Zhuhai and Xiamen. Visitors can only stay within these cities and cannot proceed further into other parts of mainland China. Visas for Shenzhen are valid for five days, and visas for Xiamen and Zhuhai are valid for three days. The duration of stay starts from the next day of arrival. The visa can only be obtained only upon arrival at Luohu Port, Huanggang Port Control Point, Fuyong Ferry Terminal or Shekou Passenger Terminal for Shenzhen; Gongbei Port of Entry, Hengqin Port or Jiuzhou Port for Zhuhai; and Xiamen Gaoqi International Airport for Xiamen. Visa fees are charged on a reciprocal basis, ranging from ¥168 for citizens of most countries to ¥956 for citizens of the United States.

Citizens of the following countries are ineligible for the SEZ visa for Shenzhen:

Afghanistan; Algeria; Bahrain^{*}; Cameroon; Egypt; Iran	Iraq; Jordan; Kuwait^{*}; Lebanon; Liberia; Libya	Morocco; Oman^{*}; Pakistan; Palestine; Saudi Arabia^{*}; Somalia	Sri Lanka; Sudan; Syria; Turkey; Uganda; Yemen

_{* - Travellers may enter without visa under a temporary measure to bypass this restriction.}

== Port visa (visa on arrival) ==
Foreigners seeking to visit China but is unable to obtain a visa due to time constraints, may arrive in China and apply for a maximum stay of 30 days port visa upon arrival, if the travel is for one of the following purposes:

- Non-diplomatic, official business activities, visits and exchanges
- Investment and entrepreneurship;
- Private affairs
- Visiting relatives

The visitor must have an invitation letter from a Chinese sponsor, and other accompanying documents to attest to the urgency which prevents them from applying for a visa in time. Port visa facility is available at the following ports:

Airports (52)

- Beijing – Capital
- Beijing – Daxing
- Changchun
- Changsha
- Changzhou
- Chengdu – Tianfu
- Chongqing
- Dalian
- Fuzhou
- Guangzhou
- Guilin
- Guiyang
- Haikou
- Hangzhou
- Harbin
- Hefei
- Hulunbuir
- Huangshan
- Jieyang
- Jinan
- Kashgar
- Kunming
- Lanzhou
- Nanchang
- Nanjing
- Nanning
- Ningbo
- Qingdao
- Quanzhou
- Sanya
- Shanghai – Hongqiao
- Shanghai – Pudong
- Shenyang
- Shenzhen
- Shijiazhuang
- Taiyuan
- Tianjin
- Urumqi
- Weihai
- Wenzhou
- Wuhan
- Wuxi
- Xiamen
- Xi'an
- Xining
- Xuzhou
- Yancheng
- Yanji
- Yantai
- Yinchuan
- Zhangjiajie
- Zhengzhou

Land (19)

- Dongning
- Dongxing
- Erlian
- Friendship Pass
- Fuyuan
- Gongbei
- Heihe
- Hekou
- Hengqin
- Huanggang
- Hunchun
- Luobei
- Luohu
- Manzhouli
- Mohan
- Raohe
- Suifenhe
- Tongjiang
- Zhuhai

Seaports (18)

- Dalian
- Dandong
- Fuyong
- Haikou
- Jiuzhou
- Lianyungang
- Longyan
- Pingtan
- Qingdao
- Rizhao
- Sanya
- Shekou
- Shidao
- Weihai
- Xiamen – Wutong
- Yantai
- Yingkou
- Zhongshan

Holders of the following documents are not eligible for this service:

- British National (Overseas) passport
- Hong Kong SAR passport
- Macau SAR passport
- Taiwan passport
- Refugee or stateless person travel document

== Entry procedures for Hong Kong, Macau and Taiwan ==
Due to the complicated cross-strait relations between mainland China and Taiwan, as well as the One Country, Two Systems policy, travelers who are citizens of PRC or ROC may not use their Taiwan, Hong Kong, or Macau passports. Instead, they are required to have different types of permits/travel documents listed below when traveling to mainland China.

=== Overview ===
Citizenship	Residency	Travel with...	Validity	Number of entries	Duration of stay
Chinese (PRC)	Hong Kong; Macau	Mainland Travel Permit for Hong Kong and Macao Resident	10 years (for adults)	Multiple	Unlimited stay
Chinese (PRC)	Hong Kong; Macau	Mainland Travel Permit for Hong Kong and Macao Resident	5 years (for minors under 18)	Multiple	Unlimited stay
Chinese (PRC)	Hong Kong; Macau	Exit and Entry Permit	3 months	Single	3 months
Chinese (PRC)	Hong Kong; Macau	Chinese Travel Document	2 years (maximum)	Multiple	Up to 2 years
Others (Non-Chinese permanent residents of Hong Kong and Macau)	Hong Kong; Macau	Mainland Travel Permit for Hong Kong and Macao Resident (non-Chinese Citizens)	5 years	Multiple	90 days
Others (Non-Chinese non-permanent residents of Hong Kong and Macau)	Hong Kong; Macau	Chinese visa	varies (up to five years)	varies (multiple)	varies (180 days)
Chinese (Taiwan, ROC)	Taiwan	Mainland Travel Permit for Taiwan Resident	5 years	Multiple	Unlimited stay
Chinese (Taiwan, ROC)	Taiwan	Mainland Travel Permit for Taiwan Resident	3 months	Single	3 months
Chinese (Taiwan, ROC)	Taiwan	Chinese Travel Document	2 years (maximum)	Multiple	Up to 2 years
Chinese (Taiwan, ROC)	Overseas (including nationals without household registration and nationals with ID number but living abroad)	Chinese Travel Document	2 years (maximum)	Multiple	Up to 2 years

=== Chinese citizens of Hong Kong or Macau Special Administrative Regions (SARs) ===
Under the One Country, Two Systems arrangement, both SARs maintain their own immigration policies, which are vastly different from those of mainland China, and individual border controls, which separate the territories from the mainland. The Chinese government, however, does not consider Chinese citizens with resident status of Hong Kong and Macau traveling to China as international travelers, and hence the SAR passports (or ethnic Chinese holding British National (Overseas) passports) cannot be used to enter China, regardless of whether they are arriving from Hong Kong, Macau, Taiwan or from overseas.

Therefore, in order to enter mainland China, all permanent residents and some non-permanent residents of Hong Kong SAR and Macau SAR with Chinese nationality are required to apply for a Mainland Travel Permit for Hong Kong and Macao Resident (commonly called a "Home Return Permit"), a travel document which also serves as the de facto ID card in mainland China. The permit is valid for 5 years for individuals under 18, or 10 years for those over 18. All first-time applicants must submit their applications to the China Travel Service (CTS) branch in Hong Kong or Macau, while subsequent renewals of the permit can be done in either mainland China or the two SARs. It is not possible to apply or renew the permit outside of the PRC. Holders of the permit may enter mainland China regardless of purpose of entry and may remain in mainland China indefinitely, although unlike Chinese citizens with residency in mainland China their social benefits are restricted. Home Return Permit holders also need to obtain an employment authorization from municipal governments in order to work legally in mainland China.

Those who need to travel to mainland China urgently but do not have a valid Home Return Permit may apply for a Chinese Exit and Entry Permit, also only through the CTS, in Hong Kong or Macau or at the ports of Luohu and Huanggang. The Exit and Entry Permit is valid for three months and is only good for a single trip to mainland China. Unlike ROC citizens, there is no permit on arrival service at other ports of entry for SAR passport holders, and those seeking to enter mainland China who arrived at a port of entry without acceptable documentation for entering will be denied entry and removed from mainland China.

=== Hong Kong and Macau residents who are not Chinese citizens ===
Non-visa-exempt citizens who are non-permanent residents of Hong Kong or Macau require a visa to visit the mainland. Since 2023, all holders of non-permanent Hong Kong Identity Cards are eligible to apply for a 2-year visa with multiple entries provided that they have applied for and received at least one Chinese visa in the past, and are not employed as domestic helpers in Hong Kong. Hong Kong permanent residents are eligible for a 5-year multiple entry visa or, since 2024, a Mainland Travel Permit for Hong Kong and Macao Residents (non-Chinese Citizens) valid for 5 years.

Domestic helpers in Hong Kong can apply for a single or double-entry L visa valid for one or two stays of 30 days. Multiple-entry L visas valid for 6 months with 15-day stays are available to those who have received at least one Chinese visa. All visa applicants who are domestic helpers require a written letter from the employer stating that the employer will travel together with the visa applicant to the mainland.

Holders of the Macau Resident Identity Card are automatically eligible for multiple entry visas valid either for 6 months (for non-permanent residents) or 12 months (for permanent residents only).

Permanent residents of Hong Kong and Macau with multiple entry visas may apply for a separate sheet of paper at border checkpoints in Shenzhen and Zhuhai for Chinese entry and exit stamps.

=== Taiwanese citizens ===
The PRC does not accept ROC passports for entry and transit through mainland China, and ROC citizens with right of abode in Taiwan ("right of abode" is defined as the eligibility of holding a Taiwanese National ID Card) are required to apply for a Mainland Travel Permit for Taiwan Residents, commonly known as "Taiwan Compatriot Permit", before visiting mainland China.

The 5-year permit, which also serves as the de facto ID card in mainland China, may be applied from travel agencies in Taiwan and CTS in Hong Kong or Macau. Holders of the permit are allowed to enter mainland China for any purpose and remain in mainland China until the expiration date of the permit (up to 5 years). Those who have settled in mainland China, however, may elect to renew their permits in mainland China, and they can continue to reside in mainland China provided that their permits do not expire. A 30-day stay for each visit to Hong Kong is also permitted with the strength of the permit. Like Home Return Permit holders, holders of Mainland Travel Permit for Taiwan Residents also require to obtain a separate employment authorization before working in mainland China. They may, however, enjoy social benefits in certain municipalities like Shanghai once they have legally settled in mainland China, some of which are only offered to local residents.

For those who have never held a 5-year permit or whose permit has expired, single-entry Mainland Travel Permit for Taiwan Residents may be applied on arrival at some airports. Those who have entered China with single-entry Taiwan Compatriot Permits can apply for a long-term permit at the local EEA office.

==== Mainland Travel Permit for Taiwan Residents on arrival ====
Holders of passports of Taiwan (ROC) may obtain a single-entry Mainland Travel Permit for Taiwan Residents on arrival at some ports with a Taiwan passport (with validity of more than 3 months), Taiwanese National ID card, return ticket and 2 passport-sized photos, with a fee of CNY150. Some airports may require additional documents, such as an invitation letter. As of 20 November 2025, there are 100 ports have eligibility to issue single-entry Mainland Travel Permit. The single-entry permit is valid for a maximum stay of 3 months but can be prolonged by applying for a long-term permit at the local EEA office.

This service is not applicable to holders of valid, long-term permits. They must instead carry the long-term permit or will be refused entry for not doing so. In addition, immigration authorities at the arrival airport have the power to deny the issuance of the permit to any person not meeting the specific requirements set forth by the airport, and the person will also be removed from mainland China.

== Visa Facilitation Agreements ==
China has concluded reciprocal visa facilitation agreements on a reciprocal basis with the following countries, and nationals covered by the agreements can have their application fees waived or reduced, or be issued long-term, multiple-entry Chinese visas at the same cost as the single-entry visas. The issuance of multiple-entry visas, however, is not automatic and must be voluntarily requested by the applicant.

As of October 2024, citizens of eight countries are eligible for multiple-entry, long term visas, while citizens of three other countries are able to benefit from lowered visa fees.

Country	Validity of visa	Types of visas affected	Application fee (for regular processing only)	Effective date
Argentina	10 years	L, M	150 USD	15 Jun 2017
Australia	5 years	L, M, Q2, S2	184.5 AUD	21 Jun 2024
Brazil	10 years	L, M		10 Feb 2024
Canada	Up to 9 years and 11 months	L, M, Q2, S2	CAN$75^{1}	11 Dec 2023
Chile	Unchanged	F, L, M, Q2	Free	1 Jul 2015
Israel	Up to 10 years	L, M, Q2, S2	₪100	11 Nov 2016
Morocco	Unchanged	F, L, M, Q2	Free	25 Apr 2023
Russia	Unchanged	All types	2500 ₽ (single-entry); 5000 ₽ (double-entry); 7400 ₽ (multiple-entry)	11 Dec 2023
South Africa	5 years			1 Oct 2018
United Kingdom	2 years 5 or 10 years (for eligible persons)	L, M, Q2, S2	£85	11 Jan 2016
United States	10 years	L, M, Q2, S2	140 USD^{1}	11 Dec 2023
United States	5 years	X1	140 USD^{1}	11 Dec 2023

_{1 - Temporary visa exemption reduction until 31 Dec 2026.}

Angola
China and Angola had agreed, in principle, of issuing multiple-entry visas to citizens of both countries. Under the proposed agreement, citizens of Angola may stay for 90 days out of every 180-day period. The visa would have a 12-month validity and would be valid for multiple entries. The agreement is expected to be finalized in February 2018.

Argentina
An agreement, signed by Argentine and Chinese governments and went into effect on 22 June 2015, claimed to have "facilitates application procedures" for Argentine citizens applying for Chinese visas, In reality, the procedures, processing times and validity have remain unchanged for Argentine, since the agreement in fact only facilitated the lengthy visa application procedures for Chinese nationals.

The agreement has been amended by both parties in early 2017 which paved ways to long term, multiple-entry visas. From 15 June 2017, Argentine applicants are eligible for multiple-entry L and M visas valid for 10 years. The cost for such visa is US$60 or approximately ARS$2,400.

Bolivia
A similar agreement, which have been signed and ratified by Chinese and Bolivian governments in March 2014, also only facilitates the visa application procedures for Chinese nationals. The validity, processing times and required documentations for Bolivian nationals are unchanged. Applicants who were born in the Greater China Area or who are family members of Chinese nationals can obtain multiple-entry visas with validity of 12 or 24 months.

Brazil
An agreement between Brazil and China facilitated the issuance of visas valid for 3 years, for business purposes, for multiple entries up to 90 days each, from 24 June 2004. It was replaced by a similar agreement from 15 August 2014. From 1 October 2017, agreements extended the visa facilitation also for tourism and visiting family and friends, and increased the visa validity to 5 years. From 18 February 2024, another agreement increased the visa validity to 10 years.

Canada
Starting from March 2015, China announced that multiple-entry L, M, Q2, and S2 visas with the validity for up to nine years and 11 months (not exceeding the life of the passport) would be issued to citizens of Canada. The duration of stay is 60 days per entry for L and M visas, 90 days for S2 visas, and 120 days for Q2 visas. Visa applicants who are of Chinese descent can enjoy a 180-day duration of stay when applying for Q2 visas. The application fee is Can$100, and, since applying through a Visa Center is mandatory when in Canada, an "application service fee" is also charged with each application. Under a temporary policy, visa application fee for Canadian citizens is reduced by 25% to CAN$ 75.

Chile
Arrangements were made between Chinese and Chilean governments regarding visa fees. Starting from July 2015, Citizens of Chile can have their visa fees waived when applying for F, L, M, and Q2 visas.

Israel
China and Israel's visa facilitation agreement, signed on 29 March 2016, provide citizens of Israel access to 10-year L, M, Q2 and S2 visas (validity of the visa not exceeding life of the passport). The duration of stay is 90 days per entry for L and M visas, and 180 days for Q2 and S2 visas. The cost for a visa is ₪100 for normal processing (4 working days) and ₪200 for one-day processing. The agreement went into force on 11 November 2016. The long-term visa is only available to holders of national Israeli passport and not holders of Travel Document in Lieu of National Passport (Teudat Ma'avar).

Russia
China and Russia signed the agreement on simplification of visa procedures on 22 March 2013 and the agreement went into effect on 26 April 2014. The agreement stipulates the conditions of issuing multiple-entry visas to citizens of Russia who are of certain occupations and regulated visa fees. Single-entry visas are 3,300₽, while double-entry and multiple-entry visas are capped at 6,600₽ and 9,900₽. The agreement also stated that visa fees are to be paid in the national currencies of both countries, and due to the devaluation of the ruble in 2014 and 2015, Chinese missions in Russia increased the visa fees in ruble by 120 percent on 8 July 2016 in order to reflect the most recent conversion rate to the U.S. dollar. However, since 2016, visa fees have again been officially listed in Russian ruble only.

United Kingdom
In January 2016, Chinese authorities announced that 2-year, multiple-entry L, M, Q2, S2 visas are to be issued to citizens and nationals of the United Kingdom, and the application fee is £85. In addition, Chinese foreign missions can issue visas with 5 or 10 years of validity for "eligible" British citizens and nationals. Like Canada, all visa applicants must use the service provided by the Visa Center when applying in the UK which will charge extra fees for handling applications.

United States
Since November 2014, China agreed to issue L Tourist visas, M Business visas, Q2 Family Visit visas, and S2 Short-term Private Visit visas to citizens of the United States with a validity for a maximum of 10 years; while validity of the X1 Long-term Study visa is elongated to five years. The duration of stay is 60 days per entry for the L Tourist and M Business visas, 90 days for the S2 Short-term Private Visit visas, and 120 days for the Q2 Family Visit visas. Visa applicants can enjoy a 180-day duration of stay when applying for Q2 visas if they have "special needs". The application fee for a Chinese visa is 185 USD for regular processing (4 business days) and US$210 for expedited processing (2-3 business days), while 1-business-day rush processing is US$222 and only at the discretion of the consulate or embassy. Rush and expedited services are not provided by the Los Angeles consulate.

== Overview of Chinese visas ==
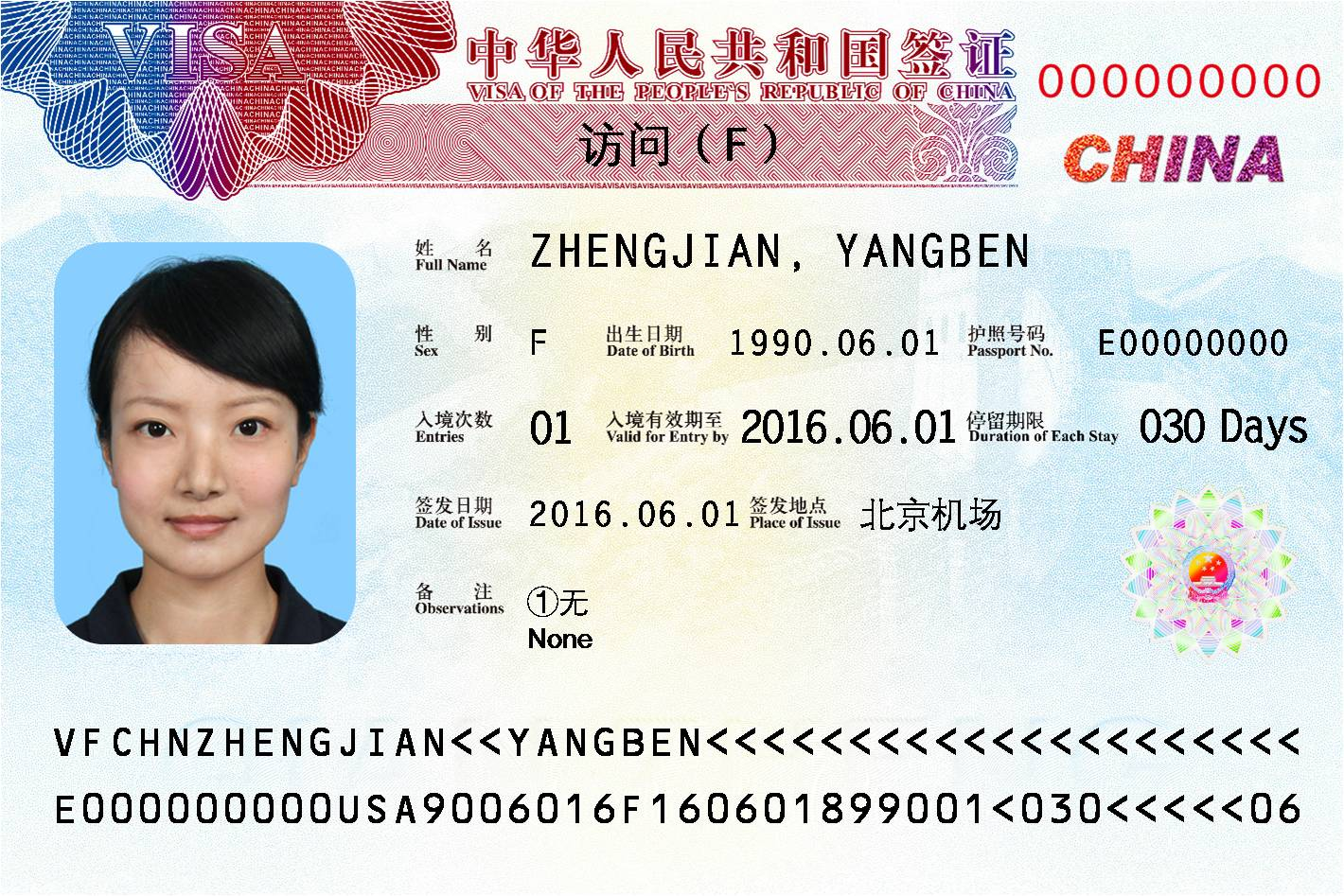
New version of Chinese Visit Visa, which issued by Chinese authorities within China and started to issue since 1 June 2019

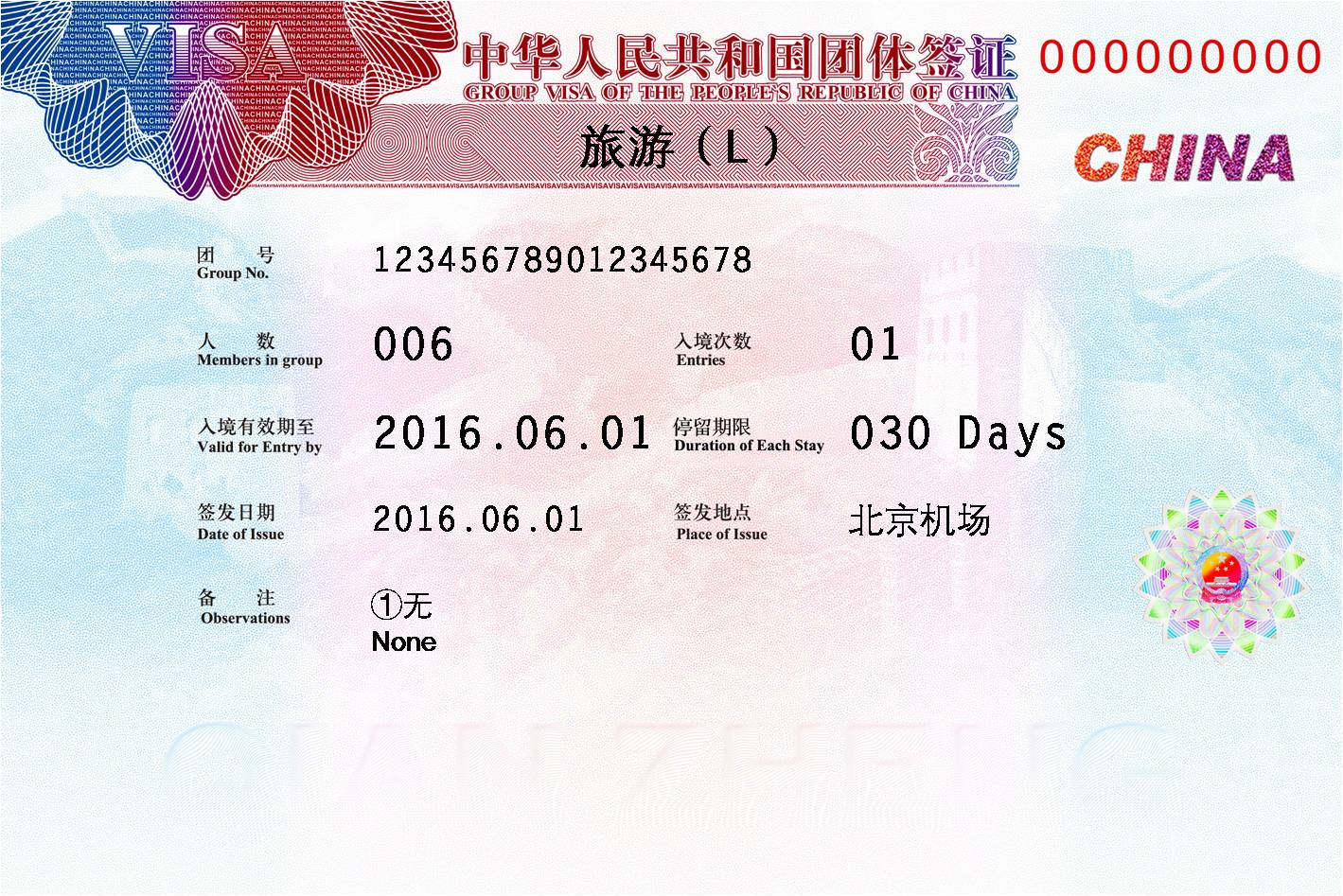
New version of Chinese group visa, which started to issue since 1 June 2019

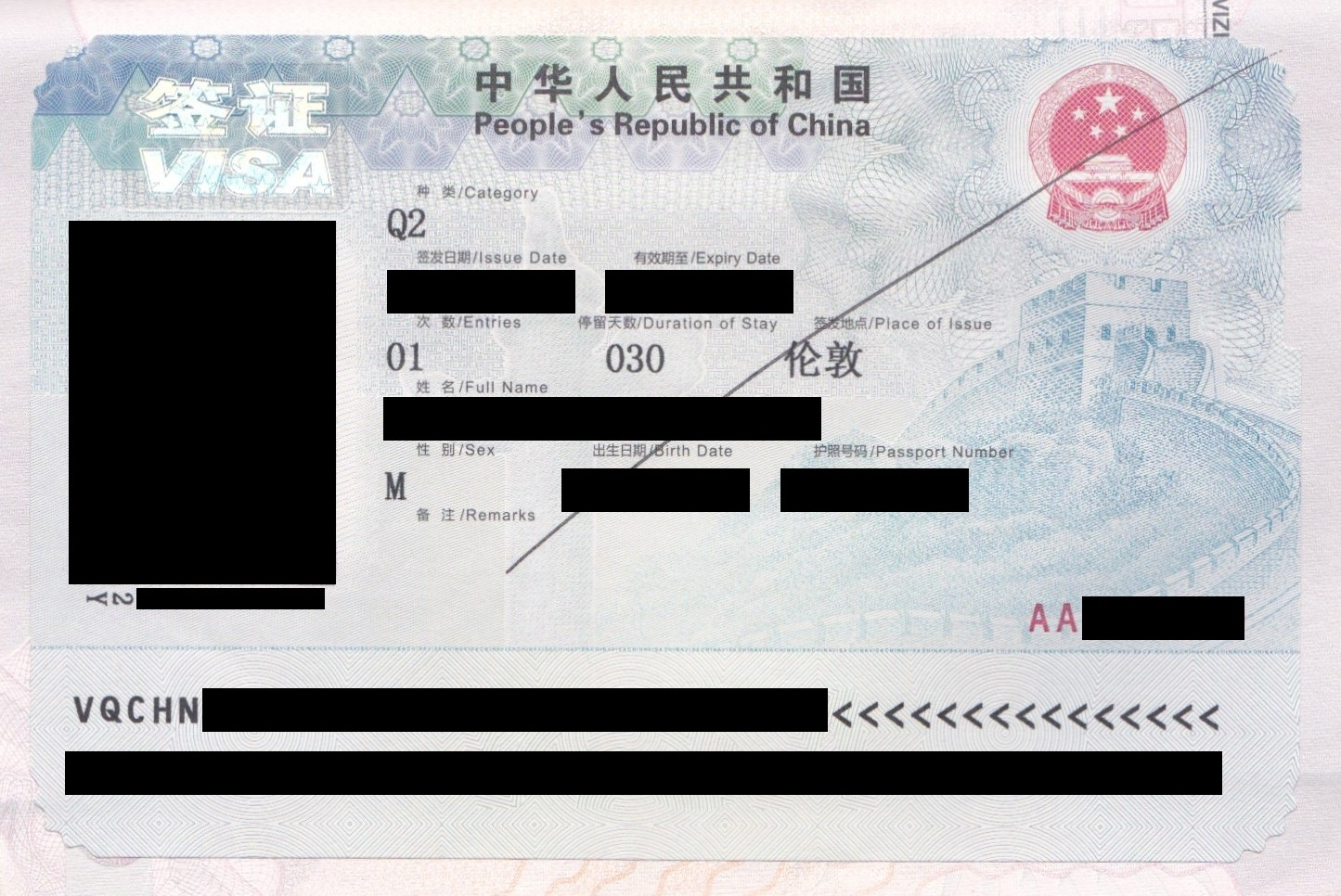
Chinese Q2 visa for family visits issued after Nov. 2018 in London

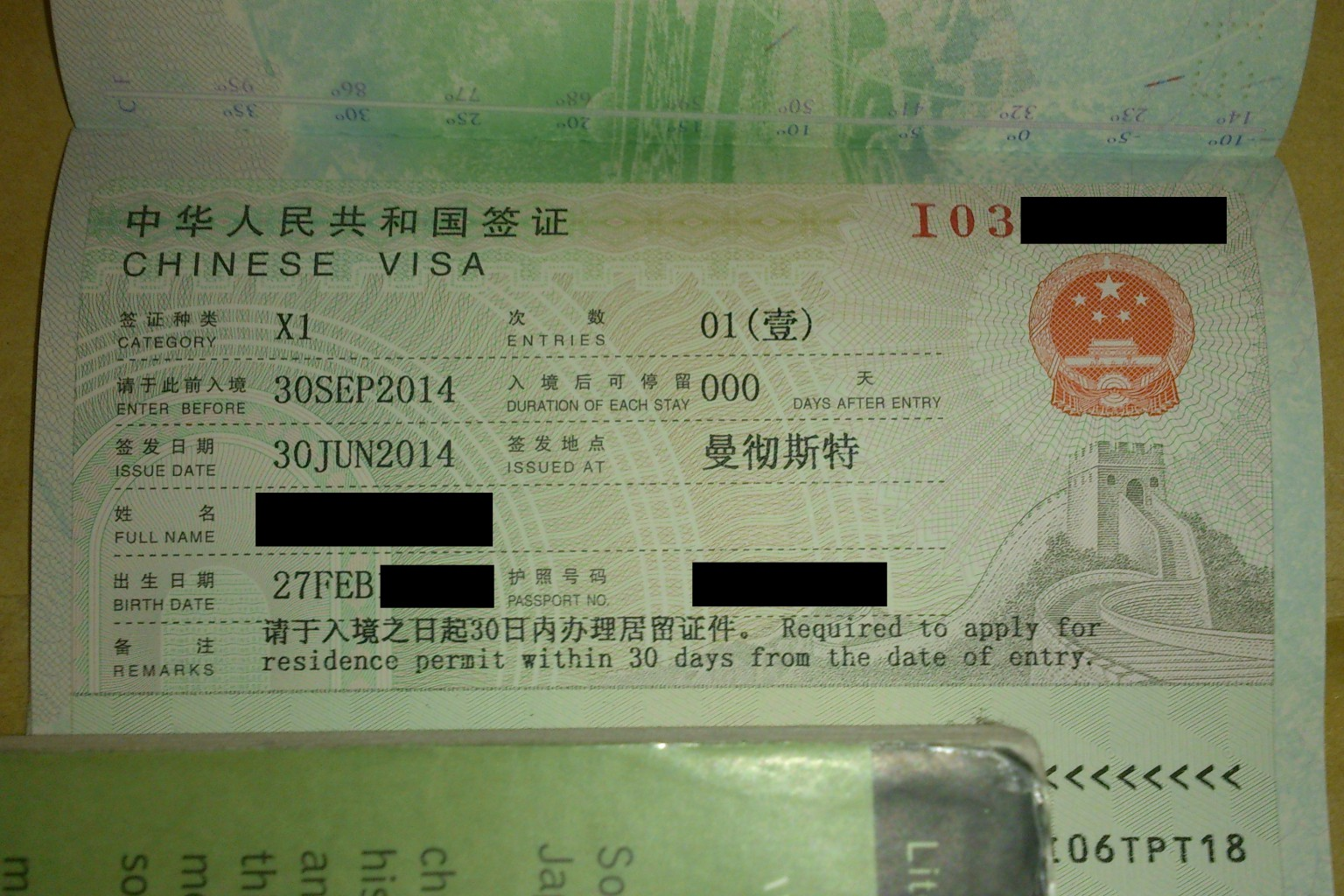
Chinese X1 visa for long-term (more than 6 months) study, issued in Manchester on a British passport

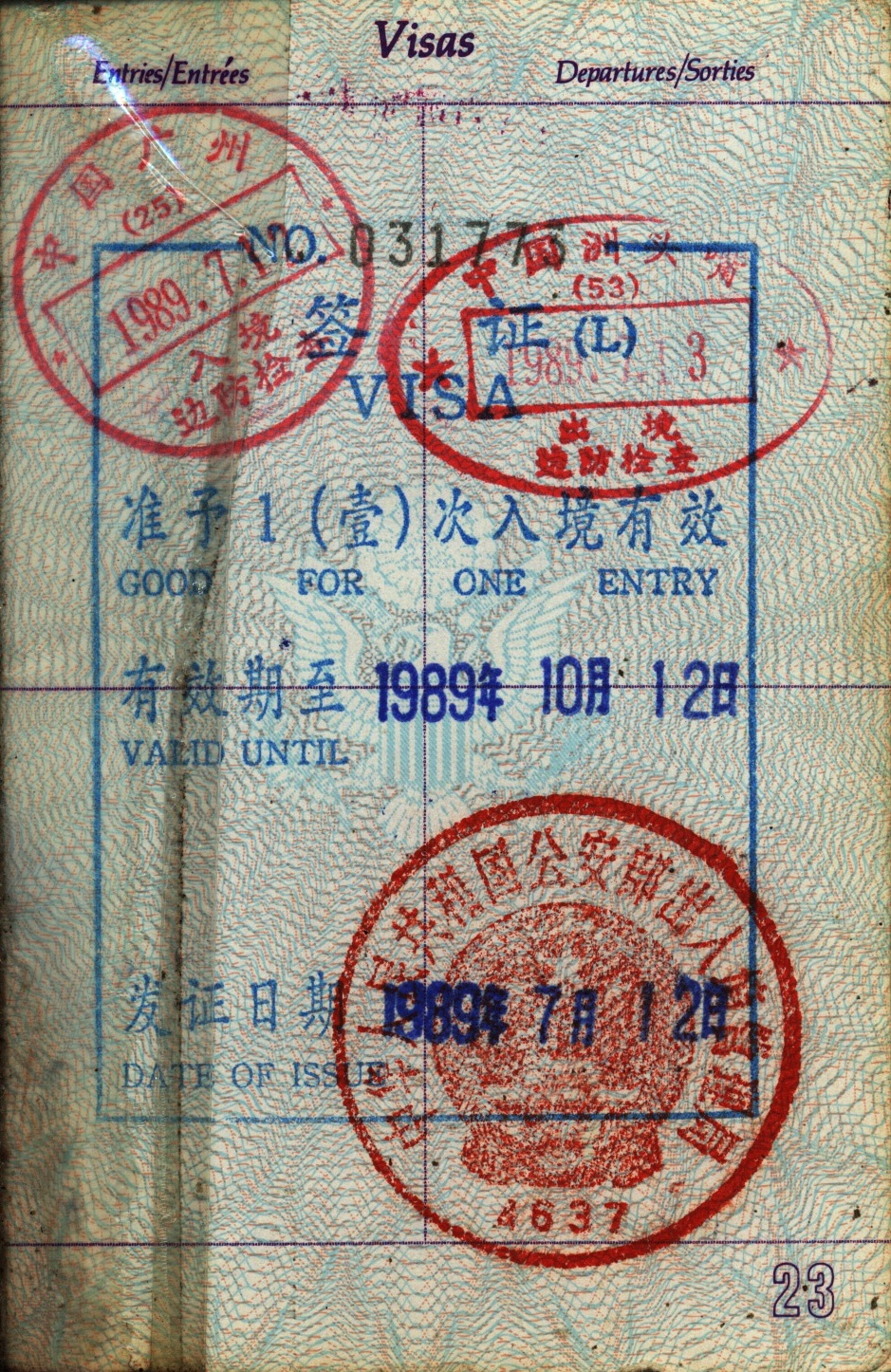
Wet-ink version of a type L visa issued in 1989 by the Exit and Entry Administration on a U.S. passport

=== Visa application procedures ===
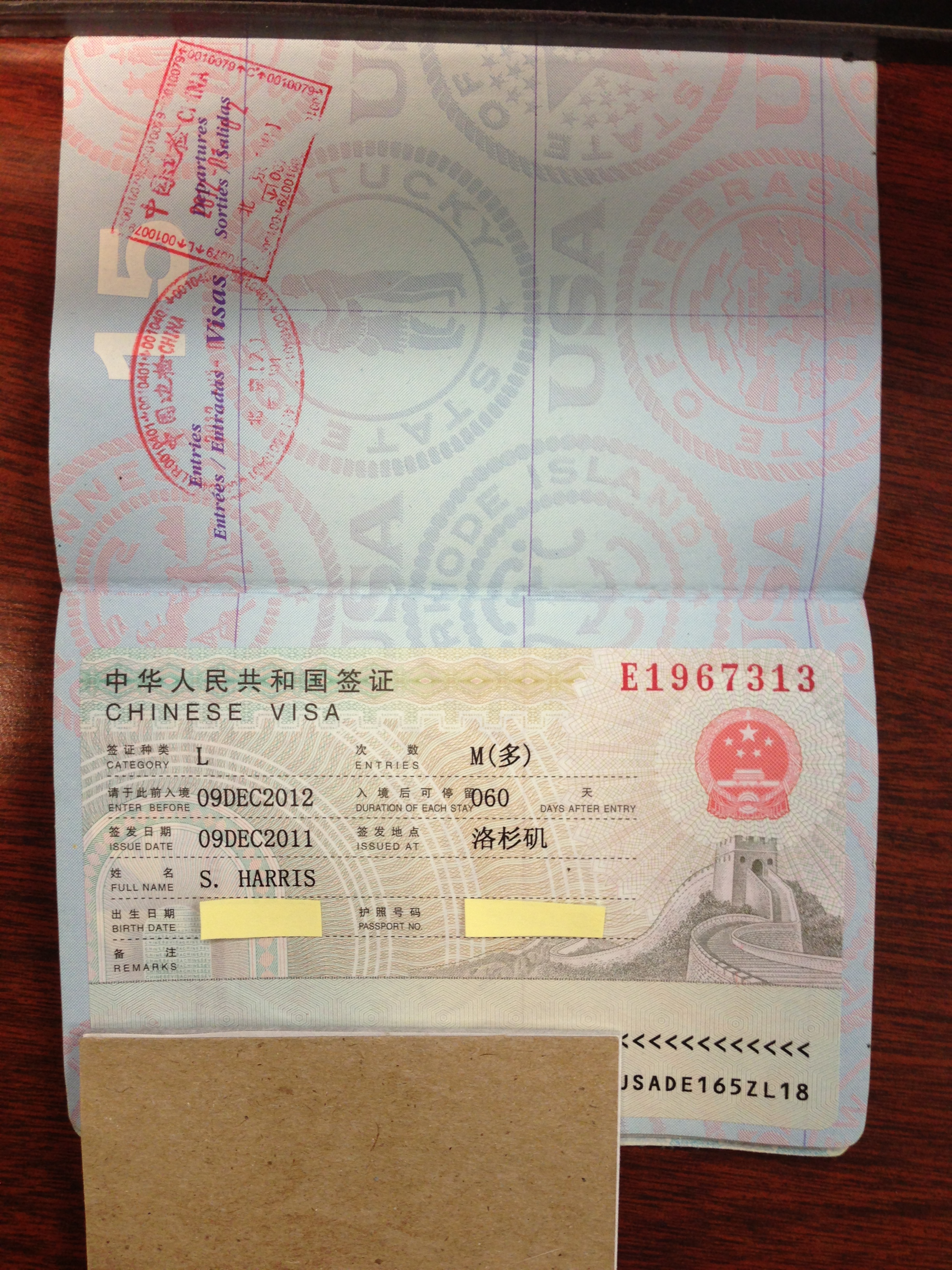
Type L 60-day visa affixed to a visa page in a U.S. passport (issued in Los Angeles)

Citizens who are not from visa-exempted countries are required to apply for a Chinese visa prior to entry into China. When applying for a visa, the applicant can choose to apply either through a travel agency or directly to the Chinese diplomatic missions.

In the latter case, the local diplomatic mission may outsource the handling of applications to a Chinese Visa Application Service Center (Visa Center), or a Chinese Visa Application Service Facility (CVASF). The Visa Center is "a commercial service organization registered in accordance with local laws and regulations and recognized by a Chinese Embassy or Consulate-General to handle the daily routine work of processing ordinary visa applications". The CVASF is similar organization, but is run exclusively by VFS Global.

The most recent visa application form, form V.2013, is in use since 1 September 2013. The form can be retrieved through the website of any Chinese diplomatic mission, Visa Center or CVASF. Only forms filled out with a computer are accepted, and older versions, as well as handwritten application forms, are no longer acceptable. Visa applicants also need to physically sign the declaration box of the form. Since May 2018, fingerprints of all 10 fingers of the hands, and in some cases voiceprints, are collected as part of the application process.

As of 2021, Visa Centers are located in the following countries and territories:

Algeria; Angola; Australia; Austria; Belgium; Canada; Czech Republic; DR Congo; Denmark; Egypt; Finland; France	Gambia; Germany; Greece; Hong Kong; India; Indonesia; Italy; Japan; Kenya; Kuwait; Lebanon	Madagascar; Malaysia; Netherlands; Nigeria; Norway; Pakistan; Philippines; Poland; Portugal; Romania; Senegal	Singapore; South Africa; South Korea; Spain; Sweden; Switzerland; Thailand; Turkey; United Arab Emirates; United Kingdom; Vietnam

In addition, CVASFs are available in the following countries:

- Angola
- DR Congo

In countries without Visa Centers or CVASFs, visa application requires submitting the passport and required documents directly to the embassy or consulate.

Citizens of the following countries must hold a visa issued in their home country. If visa is issued in a third country, a residence visa or working permit from that country is also required.

Afghanistan; Iran; Iraq; Nigeria	Pakistan; Sri Lanka^{1}; Turkey

1. for holders of normal passports only.

=== Letter of invitation ===
The Regulations of the People's Republic of China on Administration of the Entry and Exit of Foreigners, which went into effect on 1 September 2013, mandates some basic documentation for securing a Chinese visa. The most notable change is the requirement of a letter of invitation (LOI) when applying for most types of visa, which can only be issued by a resident of mainland China or a company based in mainland China. The only exceptions to this rule are for type G (transit) and L (tourism) applicants, who can either obtain a LOI, or produce their paid round-trip tickets plus the hotel reservations for the duration of their stay in mainland China.

=== Former and current nationals of the People's Republic of China and their descendants ===
Former nationals of China who have Mainland residency and who have lost their Chinese nationality are also required to produce their Chinese passports for cancellation when applying for their first Chinese visa. The cancelled passports will be returned to the applicants along with the new Chinese visa, demonstrating their loss of Chinese nationality. The requirement, however, does not apply to Hong Kong and Macau permanent residents, as their Chinese nationality is determined by their respective governments.

In some cases, a person who has or may have Chinese nationality may encounter difficulties to obtain a Chinese visa unless he or she has renounced Chinese nationality with the appropriate authorities. Numerous reports arose in June 2016 that some Canadian citizens of Chinese descent who were either born in Hong Kong or Canada to Hong Kong permanent resident parents of Chinese descent were refused Chinese visas. Instead, the Visa Centers directed them to the Chinese consulate, who then instructed them to apply for Chinese Travel Documents on the ground that they still have Chinese nationality. The Chinese consulate in Toronto clarified that the criteria of issuing Chinese visas to "Hong Kong residents" has not been changed. Meanwhile, an official of the Vancouver consulate acknowledged the policy and said it has been in force since 1996.

=== Types of Chinese visas ===
There are 4 main types of Chinese visa: diplomatic visa, courtesy visa, service visa and ordinary visa. Ordinary visas are further divided into 13 sub-types or 17 categories. The sub-type codes of ordinary visas derive from the first letter of the names in Pinyin.

Code	Type	Note
C	Crew Visa (乘务签证)	Issued to foreign crew members of means of international transportation, including aircraft, trains and ships, or motor vehicle drivers engaged in cross-border transport activities, or to the accompanying family members (Note: "家庭成员") of the crew members of the above-mentioned ships.
D	Permanent Residence Visa (定居签证)	Issued to those who intend to reside in China permanently. The Chinese government has started to implement new permanent residence policy for foreigners to attract and introduce technical talents and experts since August 2014.
E	Economic Visa (特区旅游签证)	Issued to on-arrival visitors of Shenzhen Economic Zone or Zhuhai Economic Zone who intend to only reside in those economic areas during the visitor's stay in China. Limited to 5 days or 3 days, respectively.
F	Visit Visa (访问签证)	Issued to those who intend to go to China for exchanges, visits, study tours and other activities.
G	Transit Visa (过境签证)	Issued to those who intend to transit through China.
J1	Long-term Journalist Visa (常驻记者签证)	Issued to resident foreign journalists of foreign news organizations stationed in China. The intended duration of stay in China exceeds 180 days.
J2	Short-term Journalist Visa (临时记者签证)	Issued to foreign journalists who intend to go to China for short-term news coverage. The intended duration of stay in China is no more than 180 days.
K	Science & Technology Talent Visa (科技人才签证)	Issued to foreign young science and technology professionals. The "K" visa is scheduled to issue on 1 October 2025.
L	Tourist Visa (旅游签证)	Issued to those who intend to go to China as a tourist.
M	Business Visa (商贸签证)	Issued to those who intend to go to China for commercial and trade activities.
Q1	Family Reunion Visa (家庭团聚签证)	Issued to those who are family members "Family members" refers to spouses, parents, sons, daughters, spouses of sons or daughters, brothers, sisters, grandparents, grandsons, granddaughters and parents-in-law of Chinese citizens or of foreigners with Chinese permanent residence and intend to go to China for family reunion, or to those who intend to go to China for the purpose of foster care. The intended duration of stay in China exceeds 180 days.
Q2	Family Visit Visa (探亲签证)	Issued to those who intend to visit their relatives who are Chinese citizens residing in China or foreigners with permanent residence in China. The intended duration of stay in China is no more than 180 days.
R	Talent Visa (人才签证)	Issued to those who are high-level talents or whose skills are urgently needed in China.
S1	Long-term Private Visit Visa (长期私人事务签证)	Issued to those who intend to go to China to visit the foreigners working or studying in China to whom they are spouses, parents, sons or daughters under the age of 18 or parents-in-law, or to those who intend to go to China for other private affairs. The intended duration of stay in China exceeds 180 days.
S2	Short-term Private Visit Visa (短期私人事务签证)	Issued to those who intend to visit their family members who are foreigners working or studying in China, or to those who intend to go to China for other private matters. The intended duration of stay in China is no more than 180 days.
T	Humanitarian Visa (人道签证/停留)	Issued only to those in China who seek to exit China due to an invalid visa (overstayed, cancelled, etc.).
X1	Long-term Study Visa (长期学习签证)	Issued to those who intend to study in China for a period of more than 180 days.
X2	Short-term Study Visa (短期学习签证)	Issued to those who intend to study in China for a period of no more than 180 days.
Z	Working Visa (工作签证)	Issued to those who intend to work in China.

=== Validity, number of entries and duration of each stay of Chinese visas ===
- The "Enter Before" date is the expiration date of the visa. The visa can be used for entry into China from the date of issue until the "Enter Before" date indicated on the visa. If a visa has unused entries, the bearer can enter China before 12:00 a.m. Beijing Time on the expiration date.
- "Entries" refers to the number of times permitted to enter China during the validity of the visa. A visa becomes invalid if there are no entries left, or if there are entries left but the visa has expired. If a visa becomes invalid, its bearer must apply for a new visa before entering China. Traveling with an invalid visa will result in refusal of entry.
- "Duration of Each Stay" refers to the maximum number of days the visa bearer is permitted to remain in China for each visit. The duration of stay is calculated from (and includes) the date of entry into China.

Holders of D, Q1, J1, S1, X1 and Z visas must apply for a residence permit at the local PSB within 30 days of entry into China, unless the "Duration of Each Stay" on the visa is marked as 30 days. Members of foreign diplomatic or consular missions in China must also apply for a residence permit at the Ministry of Foreign Affairs (MFA) or local Foreign Affairs Offices (FSOs) within 30 days of entry into China.

=== Penalty for illegal stay ===
A non-Chinese or Taiwanese national whose period of stay in China exceeds the duration specified in his or her visa, stay permit or residence permit without applying for an extension, or who is found to be outside the area of approved stay, is said to be an illegal resident and is subject to fines and other penalties for violation of the Regulations of the People's Republic of China on Administration of the Entry and Exit of Foreigners. If a non-Chinese national needs to stay in China longer than the duration of stay allowed on the visa, he or she is required to submit an extension to the EEA of the municipality before his or her duration of stay expires. Approval of an extension of stay may not be granted, in which case the traveler must depart China immediately. Chinese diplomatic missions are not authorized to extend a visa.

Illegal residents who need to depart China after they have overstayed their visas may be given either a warning, a fine of CNY 500 per day of illegal residence in China, up to a maximum of CNY 10,000, or administrative detention between five and fifteen days, depending on the severity of the situation.

ROC nationals with household registration in Taiwan are applied a separate ordinance known as Measures for the Control of Chinese Citizens Traveling to or from the Region of Taiwan. The term of "illegal resident" is also used, however a ROC national is only considered as an illegal resident when his or her Mainland Travel Permit for Taiwan Residents expires and he or she have not applied for renewal before the document's expiration date. The penalty for illegal residence is a warning and CNY 100 per day of illegal stay.

== Region-specific restrictions and permit ==
=== Tibet Autonomous Region ===
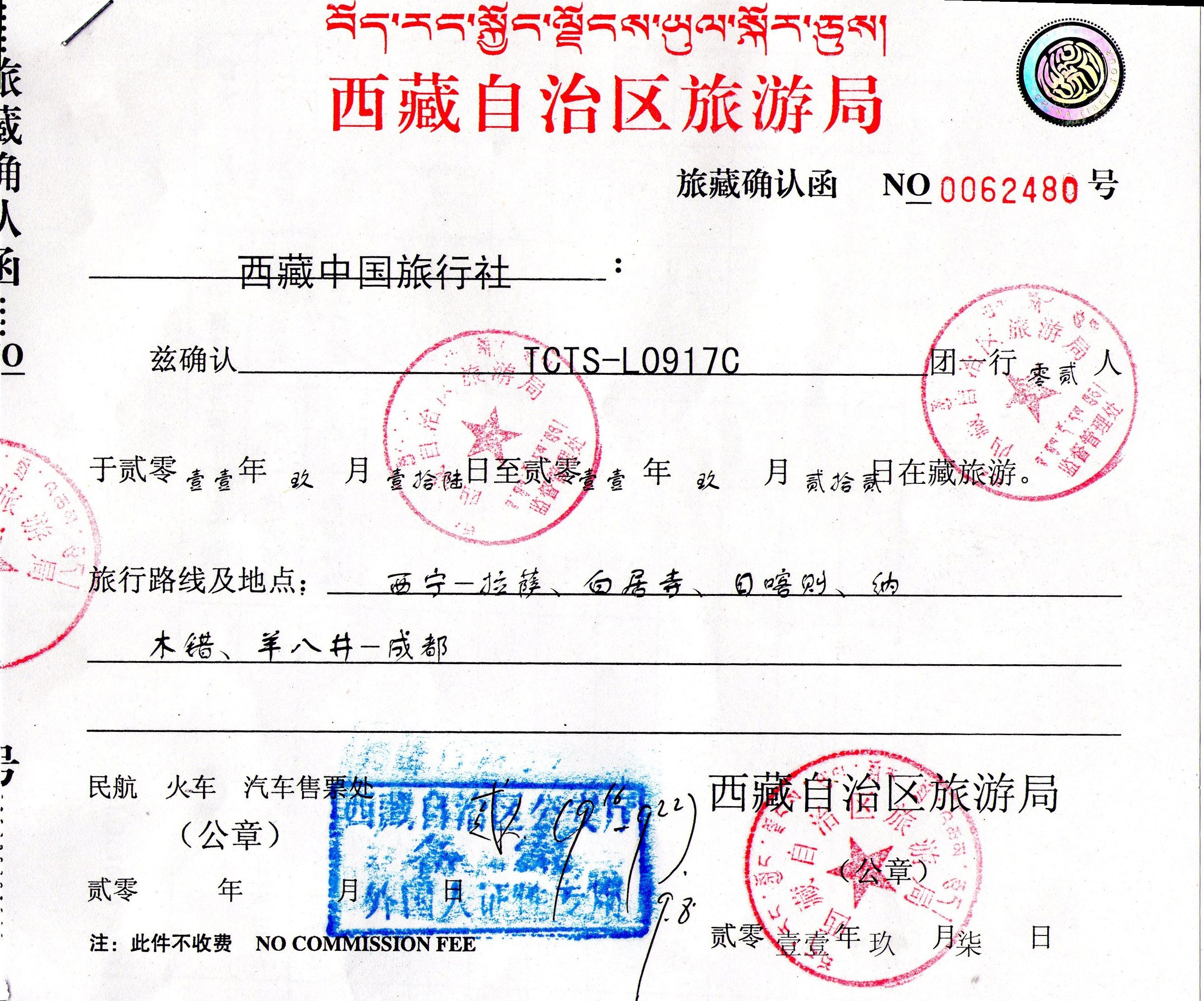
Tibet Travel Permit for foreigners

Foreigners visiting Tibet must obtain a Tibet Travel Permit (TTP) prior to departure, issued by the Tibet Tourism Bureau. Although any travel between Tibet and other parts of mainland China is domestic travel with no immigration checks, the TTP will be checked for all non-Chinese passport holders when going on board any trains or airlines that are bounded for the Tibet Autonomous Region. All the Travel Agency in Tibet will send the Tibet travel permit to a traveller's place of stay in other cities of China, In order to have the original permit in hand.

The only way to obtain a TTP is to arrange a Guided tour operated by a Tibet-based travel agent which at least includes tour guide, hotels and private transportation. Visitors are also not permitted to travel by public buses across Tibet and are only allowed to travel by private transportation as organised in the tour. Moreover, if entering Tibet from Nepal, one can only enter in Tibet with a China Tourist Visa (L category) or China Group Visa. The TTP has to be handed in to the tour guide upon arrival at the airport or train station, and the tour guide will keep the permit until the traveler leaves the TAR.

The processing time of a TTP is normally 7 to 14 business days for Lhasa and Everest base camp tours, and it will take more than 20 days if one is visiting the Kailash region. Tourists are advised to contact the travel agencies 15 to 20 days in advance. TTP and other permits are free of cost but must be book a guided tour with local travel agency.

There are several other permit types in addition to the basic TTP: a border permit for visiting border areas such as North Everest base camp and Kailash, a military permit for visiting Kailash, overland journeys between Nepal and China, and international flights from Hong Kong or Kathmandu.

The TTP is also required by citizens of Taiwan (ROC) holding a Mainland Travel Permit for Taiwan Residents or a Chinese Travel Document, but it is not required for any person with a Chinese Resident Identity Card or Chinese nationals residing in Hong Kong or Macau with a Mainland Travel Permit for Hong Kong and Macau Residents. Hong Kong, Macau and Taiwan residents with a Resident Permit are also exempt from TTP requirements.

Foreign diplomats and journalists are prohibited from traveling to Tibet without the permission of the Chinese government and, if approved, can only join tours that are accompanied and organized by Chinese government officials. In practice, journalists are escorted by MFA and MPS officials for the entire duration of their visit, and their movements are limited in order to prevent them from communicating unsupervised with local Tibetans.

In March 2016, the Tibetan regional government announced plans to reform the Tibet entry process, which include the streamlining of TTP and ATP application procedures and shortening permit processing times. There is no timeline of implementation of these measures, as officials claimed that they were "still being studied".

=== Stapled visas for territories disputed with India ===
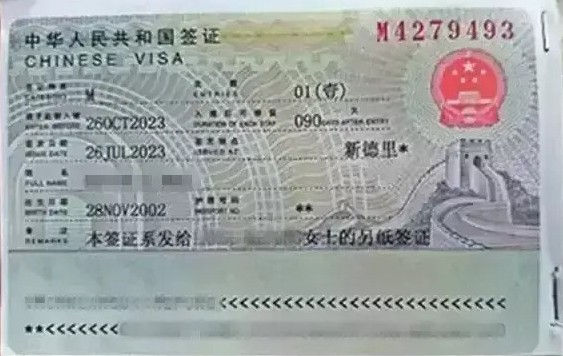
Chinese stapled visa. This particular example was issued to an Indian athlete hailing from Arunachal Pradesh in order to participate at the 2022 Asian Games in Hangzhou, China

In 1981, the Chinese government started issuing visas stapled to a separate piece of paper for Indian government officials visiting from Arunachal Pradesh, as opposed to the norm of stamping the visa in the bearer's passport. This was adopted as a compromise, as the Chinese government considers most of Arunachal Pradesh to belong to China under the designation of "South Tibet", and had planned not to issue a visa to visiting officials on the basis that they were simply traveling from one part of China to another.

From the late 2000s onward, the Chinese government again stopped issuing visas to officials from Arunachal Pradesh and adopted stapled visas for ordinary Indian citizens in Arunachal Pradesh (albeit on an inconsistent basis), as well as Jammu and Kashmir. Since then, the Indian government has not recognized the stapled visas as valid travel documents, leading to incidents over the years where Indian governmental delegations have been halted or reduced in size to avoid issuance of the stapled visas, and Indian sports teams traveling to China with stapled visas have been denied flight boarding by the Indian government.

== Police registration ==
All foreign nationals who stay in mainland China for more than 24 hours must register with the local public security bureaus (PSBs) or offices. When staying in a hotel or bed and breakfast, the registration is done as a part of the check-in process. When staying in a private home, however, the visitor should report to the local PSB, community police service office or foreigner service stations within 24 hours of arrival for cities or 72 hours for rural areas. Furthermore, in major cities like Beijing, an online accommodation registration service for foreign residents has been introduced. Foreigners staying in a private home can upload their identification documents, passport-sized photos, and housing information to complete their accommodation registration without the need to physically visit any government office. All visa-free passengers, including those in transit who stay for more than 24 hours, must adhere to the rule, as failure to comply can result in a warning, a fine or being detained by PSB for up to 15 days. Since January 2018, persons utilizing the 144-hour visa-free transit who failed to register with the local PSBs are banned from using visa-free transit for a period of 2 years from the day the offence was recorded.

From 9 February 2017, holders of non-Chinese travel documents aged between 14 and 70 have been fingerprinted upon entry, with the exception of holders of diplomatic passports.

Since 21 September 2026, foreign travellers are able to perform the police registration online.

== Visitor statistics ==
Most visitors arriving in China were from the following areas of residence or countries of nationality:

Country/Territory	2018	2017	2016	2015	2014	2013
Hong Kong	▼79,370,000	▼79,800,000	▲81,060,000	▲79,448,100	▼76,131,700	▼76,884,600
Macau	▲25,150,000	▲24,650,000	▲23,500,000	▲22,888,200	▼20,639,900	▼20,740,300
Taiwan	▲6,140,000	▲5,870,000	▲5,730,000	▲5,498,600	▲5,365,900	▼5,162,500
South Korea	▲4,193,000	▼3,863,800	▲4,775,300	▲4,444,400	▲4,181,700	▼3,969,000
Japan	▲2,691,000	▲2,683,000	▲2,588,990	▼2,497,700	▼2,717,600	▼2,877,500
United States	▲2,485,000	▲2,312,900	▲2,249,600	▼2,085,800	▲2,093,200	▼2,085,300
Russia	▲2,415,000	▲2,356,800	▲1,976,600	▼1,582,300	▼2,045,800	▼2,186,300
Vietnam	—N/a	—N/a	—N/a	▲2,160,800	▲1,709,400	▲1,365,400
Mongolia	▲1,916,000	▲1,864,500	▲1,581,200	▼1,014,100	▲1,082,700	▲1,050,000
Malaysia	▲1,291,000	▲1,233,200	▲1,165,400	▼1,075,500	▼1,129,400	▼1,206,500
Philippines	▲1,205,000	▲1,168,500	▲1,135,100	▲1,004,000	▼967,900	▲996,700
Pakistan	—N/a	—N/a	▼949,000	▲1,141,500	▼1,113,100	▲1,151,700
Singapore	▲978,000	▲941,200	▲924,600	▼905,300	▲971,400	▼966,600
India	▲864,000	▲822,000	▲799,700	▲730,500	▲710,000	▲677,000
Canada	▲850,000	▲806,000	▲741,300	▲679,800	▼667,100	▼684,200
Thailand	▲833,000	▲776,700	▲753,500	▲641,500	▼613,000	▲651,700
Australia	▲752,000	▲734,300	▲675,100	▼637,300	▼672,000	▼723,000
Total (excluding Hong Kong, Macau and Taiwan)	▲30,543,000	▲29,165,300	▲28,150,120	▼25,985,400	▲26,361,000	▼26,290,000

== See also ==
- Visa requirements for Chinese citizens
- List of diplomatic missions of China
- Visa (document)
- Exit bans in China
