= Mainland Travel Permit =

Mainland Travel Permit may refer to:

- Mainland Travel Permit for Hong Kong and Macao Resident
- Mainland Travel Permit for Taiwan Resident
