= Hong Kong-Zhuhai-Macao Bridge Hong Kong Port =

Hong Kong Port

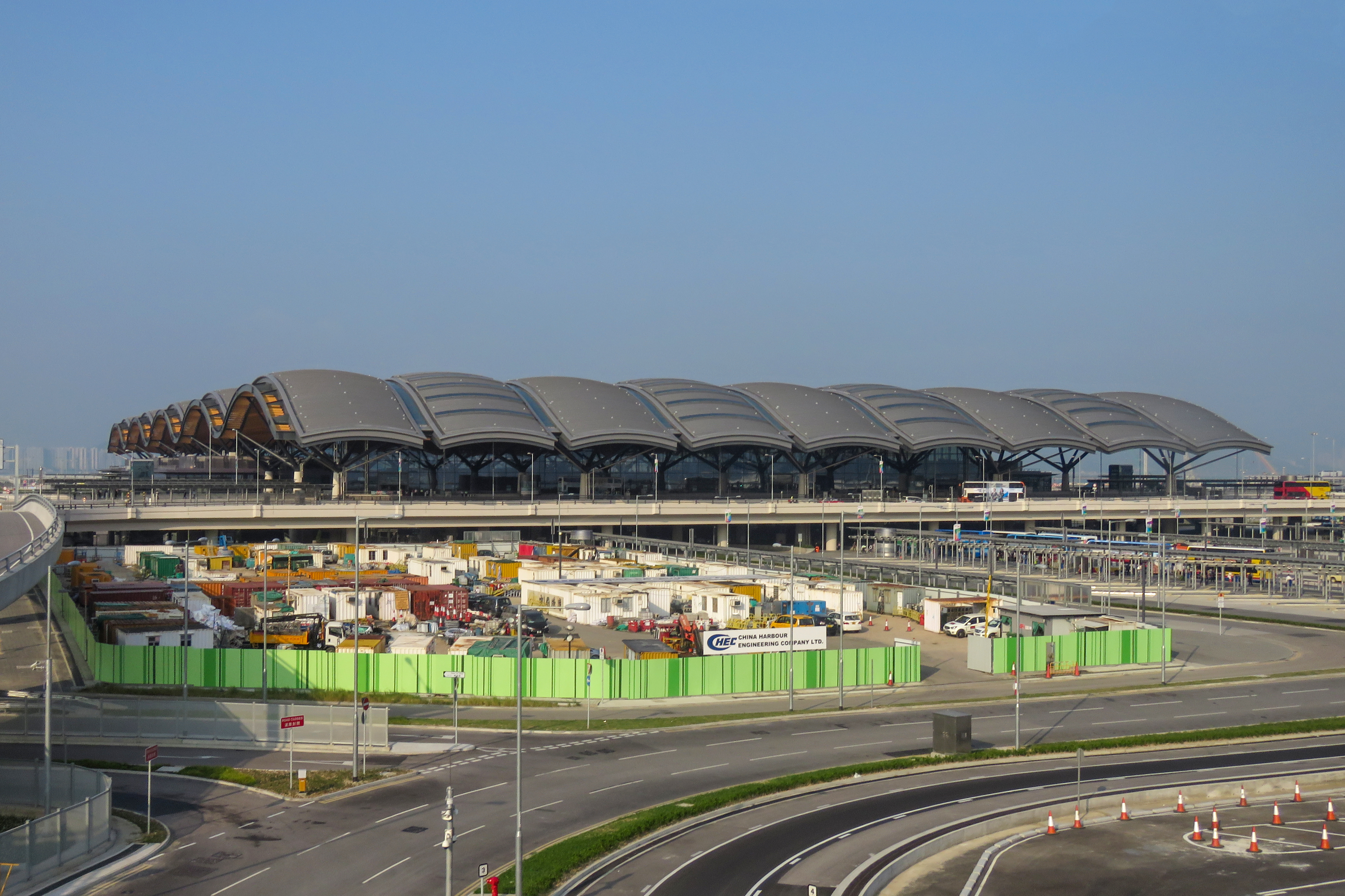
- Hong Kong Port of the Hong Kong–Zhuhai–Macao Bridge (2018)

Location
- Country: Hong Kong SAR
- Location: Chek Lap Kok, Lantau Island, Hong Kong
- Coordinates: 22.3171°N 113.9544°E

Details
- Opened: October 24, 2018; 7 years ago
- Operated by: Hong Kong Immigration Department; Hong Kong Customs and Excise Department
- Owned by: Government of the Hong Kong Special Administrative Region

Statistics
- Passenger traffic: 14 million (2023)

Website
- Hong Kong Immigration Department – HZMB Port

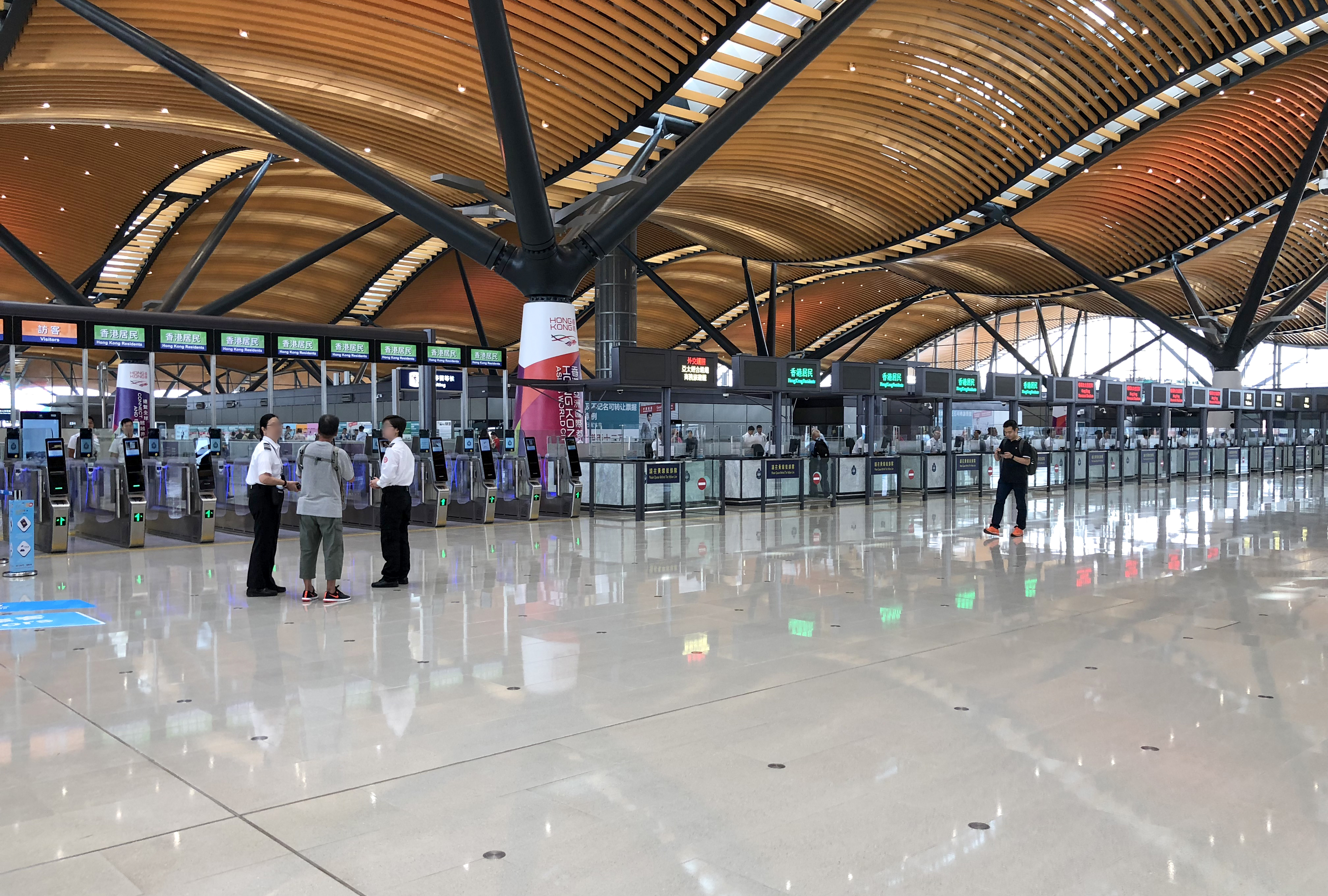
Immigration counters at the Departure Hall

The Hong Kong-Zhuhai-Macao Bridge Hong Kong Port is a major border control point located on an artificial island near Chek Lap Kok, adjacent to Hong Kong International Airport. It serves as the eastern terminus of the Hong Kong–Zhuhai–Macao Bridge (HZMB), a cross-border infrastructure project linking Hong Kong, Zhuhai, and Macau across the Pearl River Estuary.

Officially opened on 24 October 2018, the port includes customs and immigration facilities operated by the Hong Kong Immigration Department and the Hong Kong Customs and Excise Department. It supports both passenger and vehicle clearance, enabling 24-hour travel between Hong Kong and the Zhuhai–Macau Port on the western side of the bridge.

The port is connected to Hong Kong’s urban areas via the HK-Zhuhai-Macao Bridge Hong Kong Link Road, and is equipped with public transport interchanges, cross-boundary coach terminals, and private vehicle clearance zones. It also features e-Channel automated immigration lanes and Smart Departure systems for outbound passengers.

== History ==
The Hong Kong Port is an integral component of the USD 18.8 billion, 55 km Hong Kong–Zhuhai–Macao Bridge (HZMB), which began construction in December 2009 and was structurally completed on 6 February 2018. Designed to span the Pearl River Estuary as a steel‑cable bridge and subsea tunnel system, HZMB is the world’s longest sea‑crossing bridge.

On 23 October 2018, General Secretary of the Chinese Communist Party Xi Jinping officially inaugurated the bridge and its border facilities. Public operations commenced at 09:00, 24 October 2018. Within hours, thousands of passengers queued for the first shuttle buses from the port; by 15:30, the Zhuhai port alone had processed around 16,000 passengers and 460 vehicles.

The Hong Kong Link Road, spanning approximately 12 km—including a 9.4 km viaduct, a 1 km tunnel beneath the Airport Express line, and a 1.6 km at-grade section—was built simultaneously to connect the main bridge to the port on Chek Lap Kok’s reclaimed land. The port itself occupies around 150 ha and includes a passenger clearance building, vehicle clearance plazas, and a public transport interchange.

Since opening, the port has operated 24 hours daily, facilitating cross‑boundary traffic that significantly reduced travel times—Hong Kong to Zhuhai/Macau journey takes roughly 40 minutes versus four hours by road prior to its completion.

== Transport ==
=== Shuttle Bus (HZMBus) ===
Shuttle buses (colloquially "Gold Bus") run 24 hours daily between Hong Kong Port and the Zhuhai and Macau ports via the Hong Kong–Zhuhai–Macao Bridge.

Frequency: every 5 minutes (peak), 10–15 minutes (non‑peak), 15–30 minutes (overnight)

Travel time: approximately 40 minutes

Fare: around HK$65–70 for adults (day/overnight), with concessions available

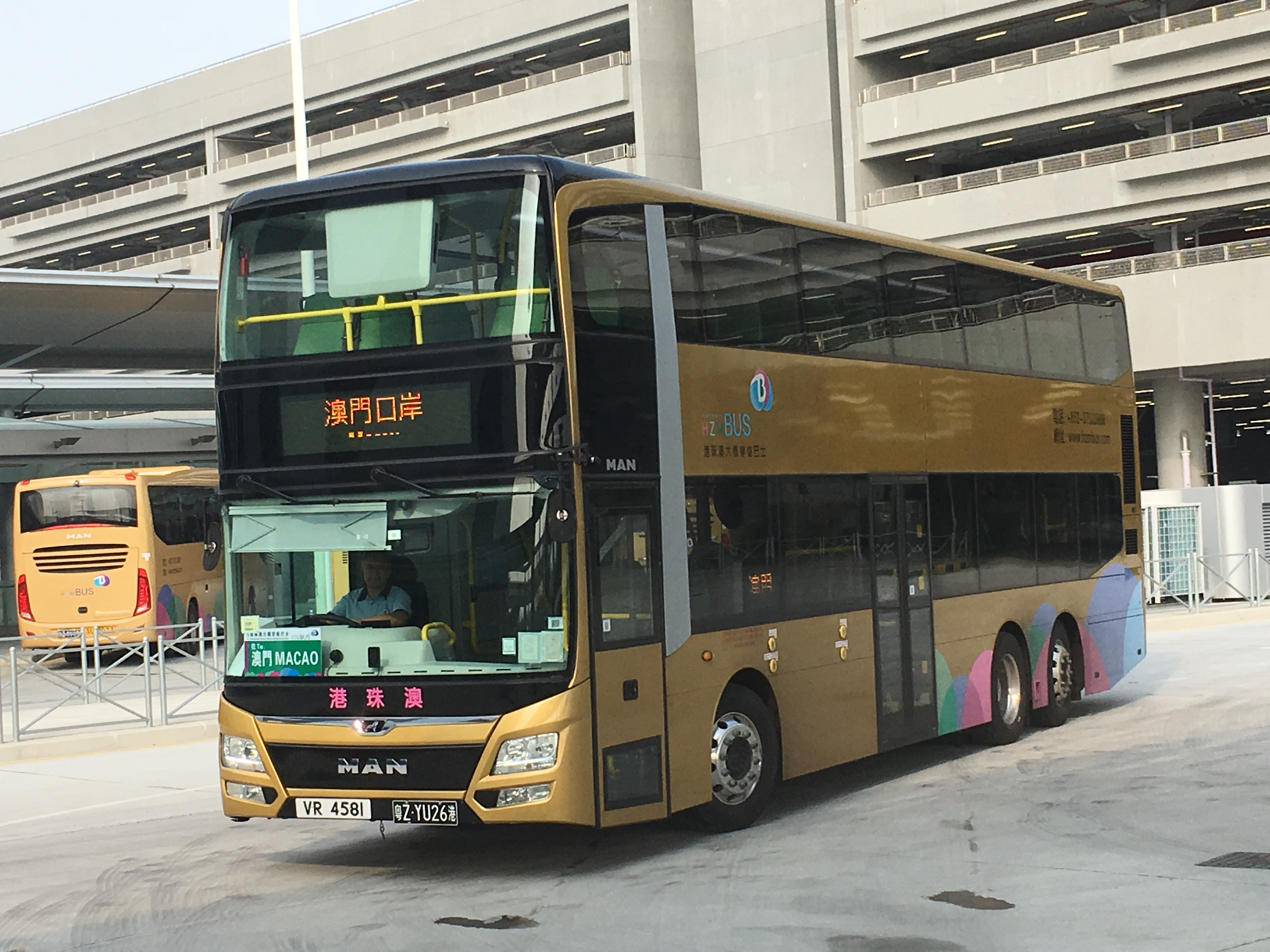
HZMB shuttle bus ("Gold Bus") at Hong Kong Port

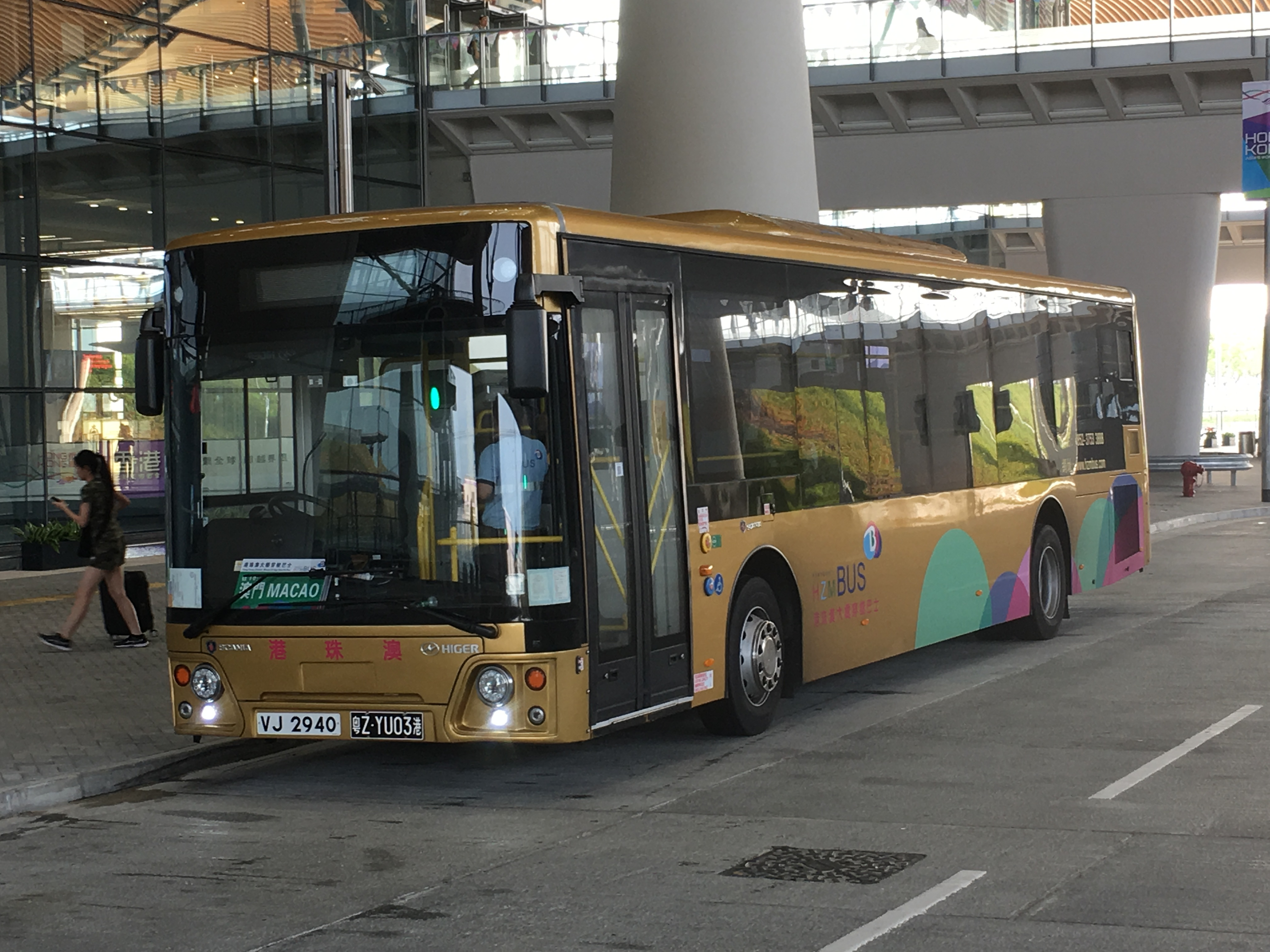
Another shuttle bus operating cross-boundary service

=== Public and Franchised Buses ===
The Public Transport Interchange (PTI) located south of the clearance building serves dozens of local routes:

Citybus and Long Win Airport "A" buses routes

Green Minibus Route 901

Cross-boundary coach pickup/drop-off

Overnight “NA” buses and shuttle feeders (e.g., B5, B6, B6S) to Sunny Bay and Tung Chung

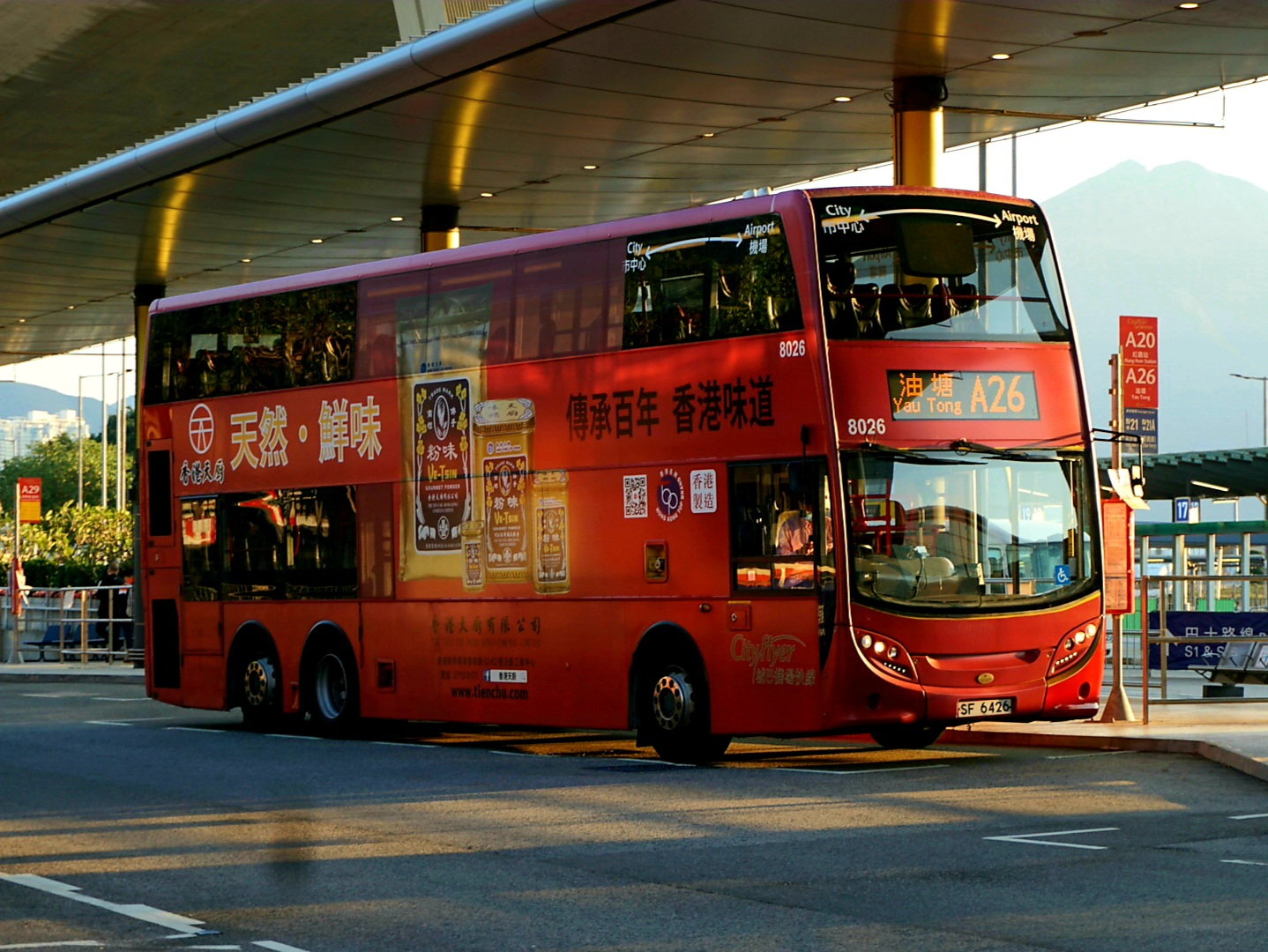
Citybus Route A26 serving the HZMB Port

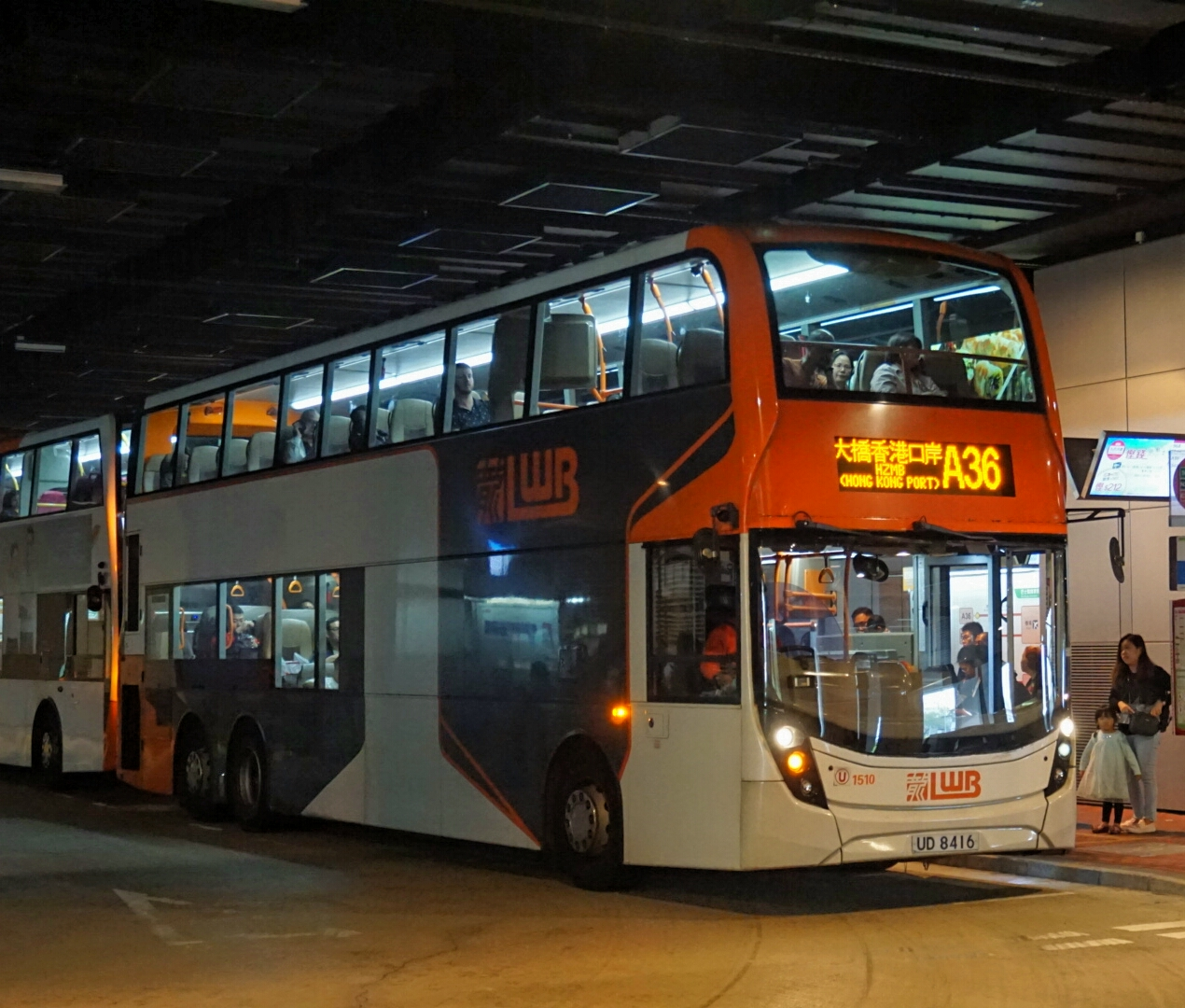
Long Win Bus Route A36 at the Hong Kong Port

=== Taxis and Private Vehicles ===
A dedicated taxi stand is available at the PTI for urban and airport journeys. Cross-boundary vehicles are also permitted with advance booking and clearance.

Private car lanes allow travelers with valid permits to cross the bridge directly. Vehicles must undergo immigration and customs inspection before departure or upon arrival.
