= Port of Zhongshan =

Port of Zhongshan 中山港
- Interactive map of Port of Zhongshan 中山港

Location
- Country: People's Republic of China
- Location: Zhongshan, Guangdong Province
- Coordinates: 22°34′22″N 113°29′21″E

Details
- Opened: 1953
- Owned by: People's Republic of China
- Type of harbour: Natural Estuary Seaport

Statistics
- Website www.zhongshanshipping.com

The Port of Zhongshan is a natural estuary port located on the coast of Zhongshan Prefectural Level city, Guangdong, People's Republic of China. It opens into the Pearl River Delta.

== Location ==
Port of Zhongshan extends on the West Shore of the Pearl River Delta between Zhuhai and Guangzhou.

== Layout ==
The Port of Zhongshan consists of three main port areas: 东有中山港区, 北有小榄港区, 南有神湾港区

- Zhongshan Port Area (中山港区): located to the east of the city, on the Hengmen Canal (横门水道).
- Xiaolan Port Area (小榄港区): to the north of the city, on the Xiaolan Canal (小榄水道)
- Shenwan Port Area (神湾港区): to the south of the city, at the mouth of the Xijiang River (西江)
