= Qingdao Port =

Seaport on the Yellow Sea

Coordinates: 36.0833°N 120.317°E

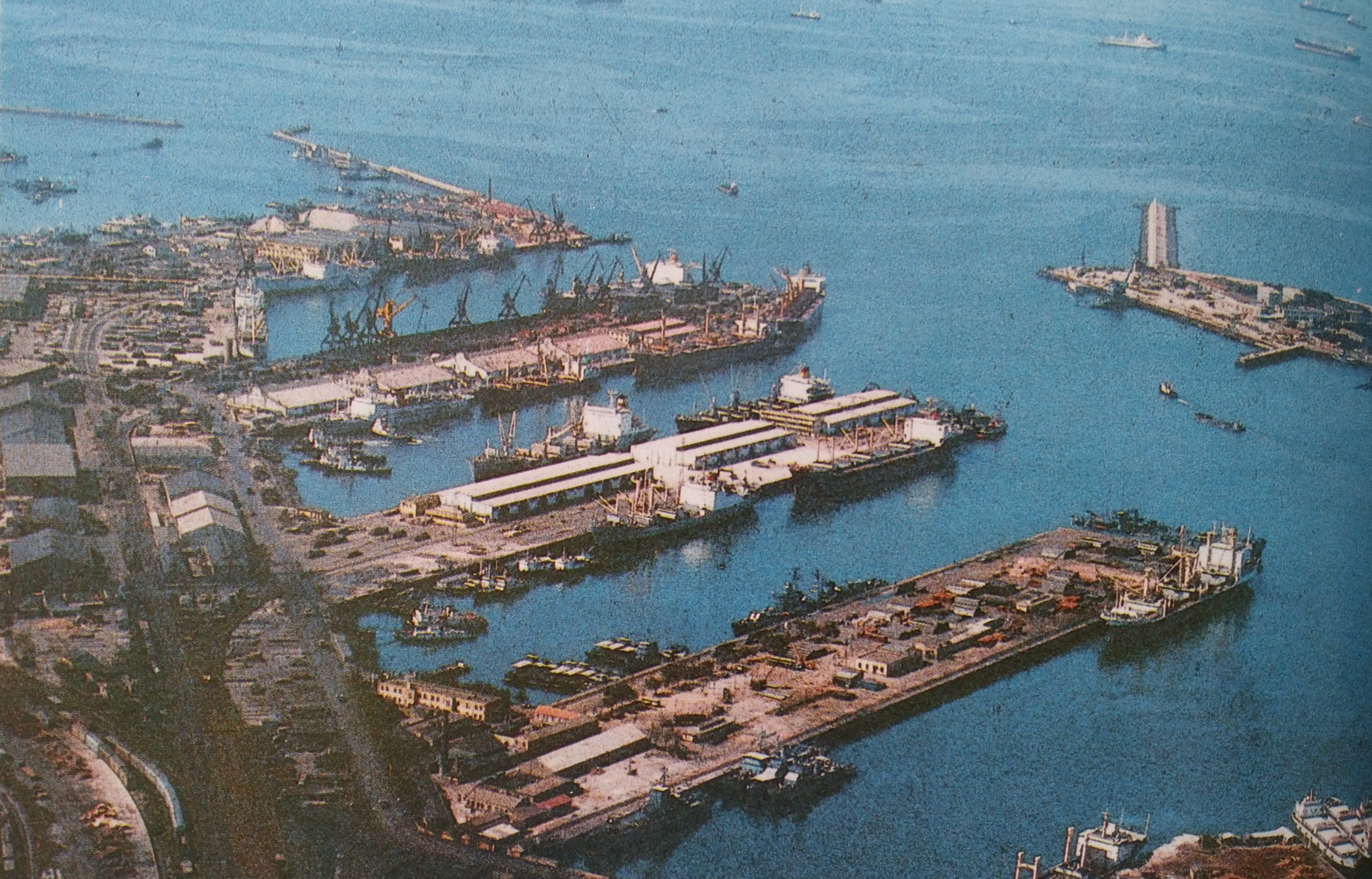
Qingdao Port in the 1980s

The Port of Qingdao is a seaport on the Yellow Sea in the vicinity of Qingdao (Tsingtao), Shandong Province, People's Republic of China. It is one of the ten busiest ports in the world (7th in 2019, considering total cargo volume).

Qingdao Port consists of four areas, which are often themselves referred to as ports due to their size: Dagang port area, Qianwan port area, Huangdong oil port area (for oil tankers), and Dongjiakou (Chinese: 董家口) port area, the latter being located 40 kilometres south of Qingdao city.

Including the Qingdao Qianwan Container Terminal and the Qingdao Cosport International Container Terminal, which are located in different areas, Qingdao also has a large terminal for handling iron ore.

== History ==
In 2011, the Qingdao Port, together with three other Chinese ports in East China's Shandong Province, signed a strategic alliance with the largest port of the Republic of Korea (ROK). The alliance included Shandong's Qingdao Port, Port of Yantai, Port of Rizhao, Port of Weihai, and the ROK's Port of Busan and aimed to build a shipping and logistics center in Northeast Asia.

In May, 2014, Qingdao Port International Co. Ltd. announced it was seeking to raise up to US$377 million in a Hong Kong initial public offering.

In August 2014, it was revealed that the firm was involved in two lawsuits with the global warehousing firm Pacorini Logistics, claiming a total of $58.4 million in damages. This followed a lawsuit the firm had already been subject to from CITIC Resources.

The port is part of the 21st Century Maritime Silk Road that runs from the Chinese coast to Singapore, towards the southern tip of India to Mombasa; from there through the Red Sea via the Suez Canal and to the Mediterranean; and from there to the Upper Adriatic region to the northern Italian hub of Trieste with connections to Central Europe and the North Sea.

A world's first suspended monorail capable of carrying fully loaded 20' and 40' containers has been under construction since 2020 at the Port of Qingdao, the first phase of which was put into operation in 2021.

== See also ==
- Container transport
- List of world's busiest container ports
- Logistic directory
