= Port of Weihai =

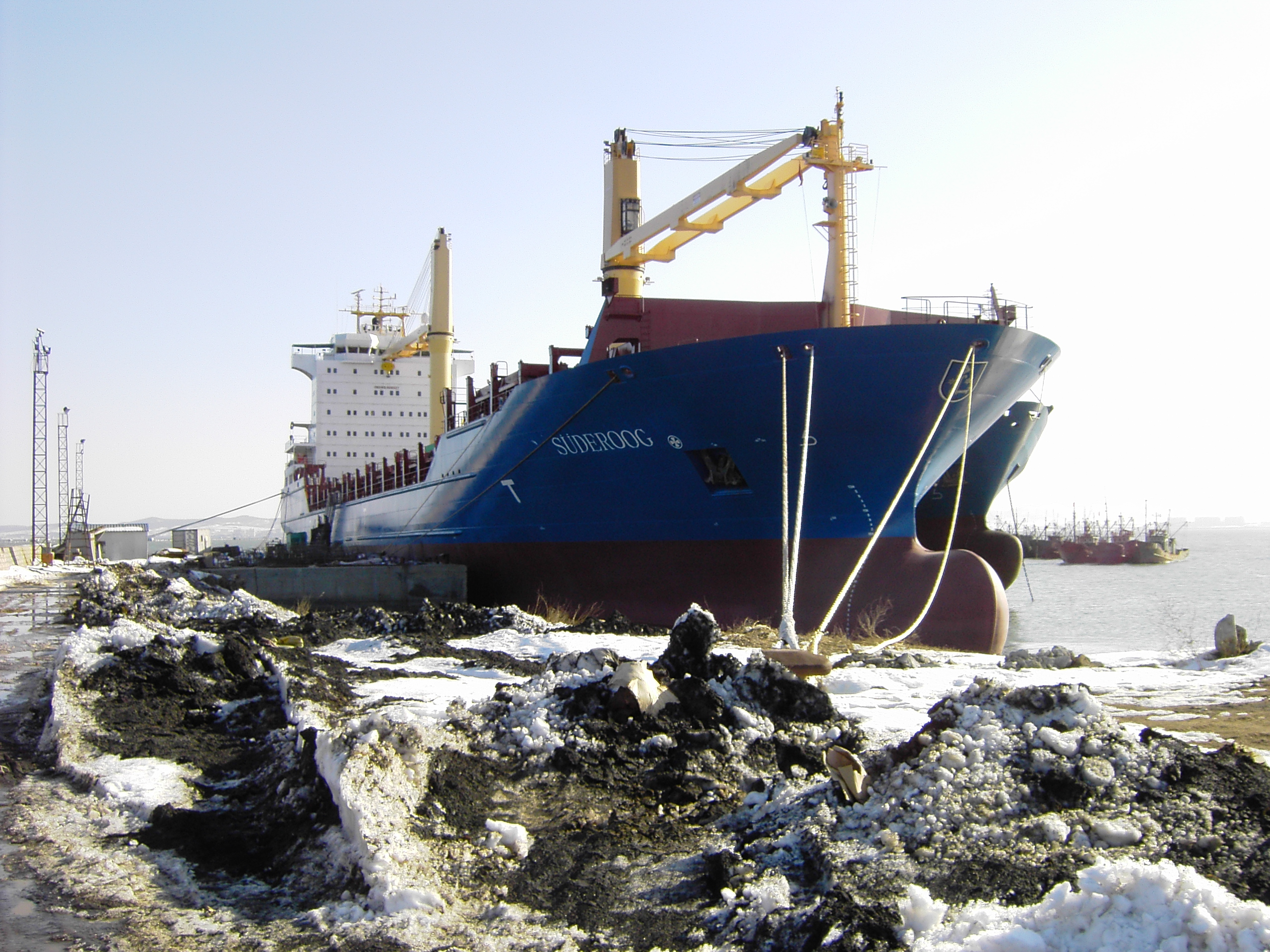
- Ship Suderoog in Port of Weihai
- Interactive map of Port of Weihai
- Location in China

Location
- Location: Shandong, China
- Coordinates: 37°26′51″N 122°11′26″E

The Port of Weihai is a seaport on the Yellow Sea in the vicinity of Weihai, Shandong, People's Republic of China.

== History ==
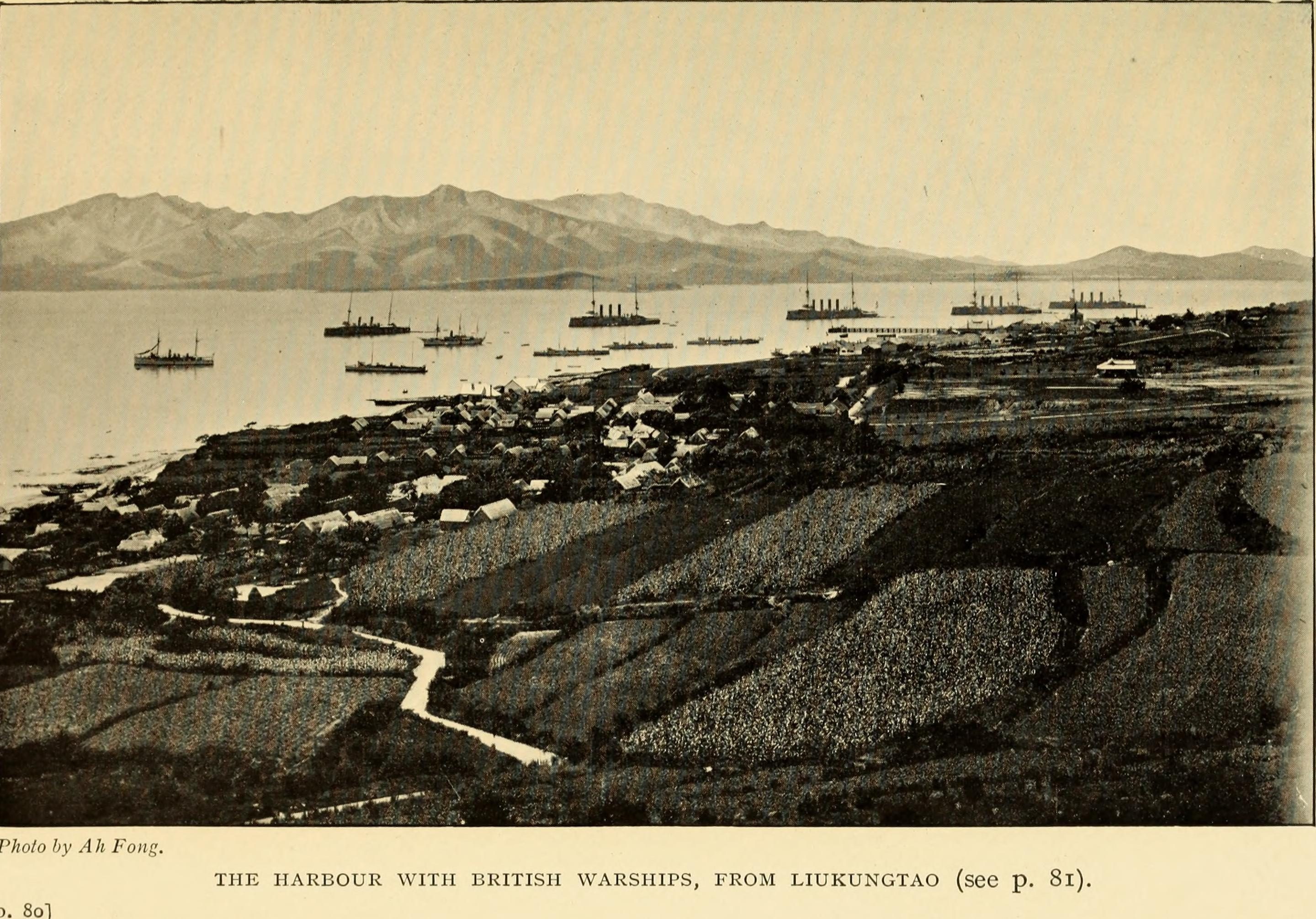
Port of Weihai in 1910

In 2011 the Port of Weihai, together with three other Chinese ports in East China's Shandong province, signed a strategic alliance with the largest port of the Republic of Korea. The alliance is jointly formed by Shandong's Qingdao Port, Port of Yantai, Port of Rizhao, Port of Weihai and the ROK's Port of Busan, aiming to build a shipping and logistics center in Northeast Asia.
