= Port of Lianyungang =

Seaport in Jiangsu Province, China

Coordinates: 34.743°N 119.422°E

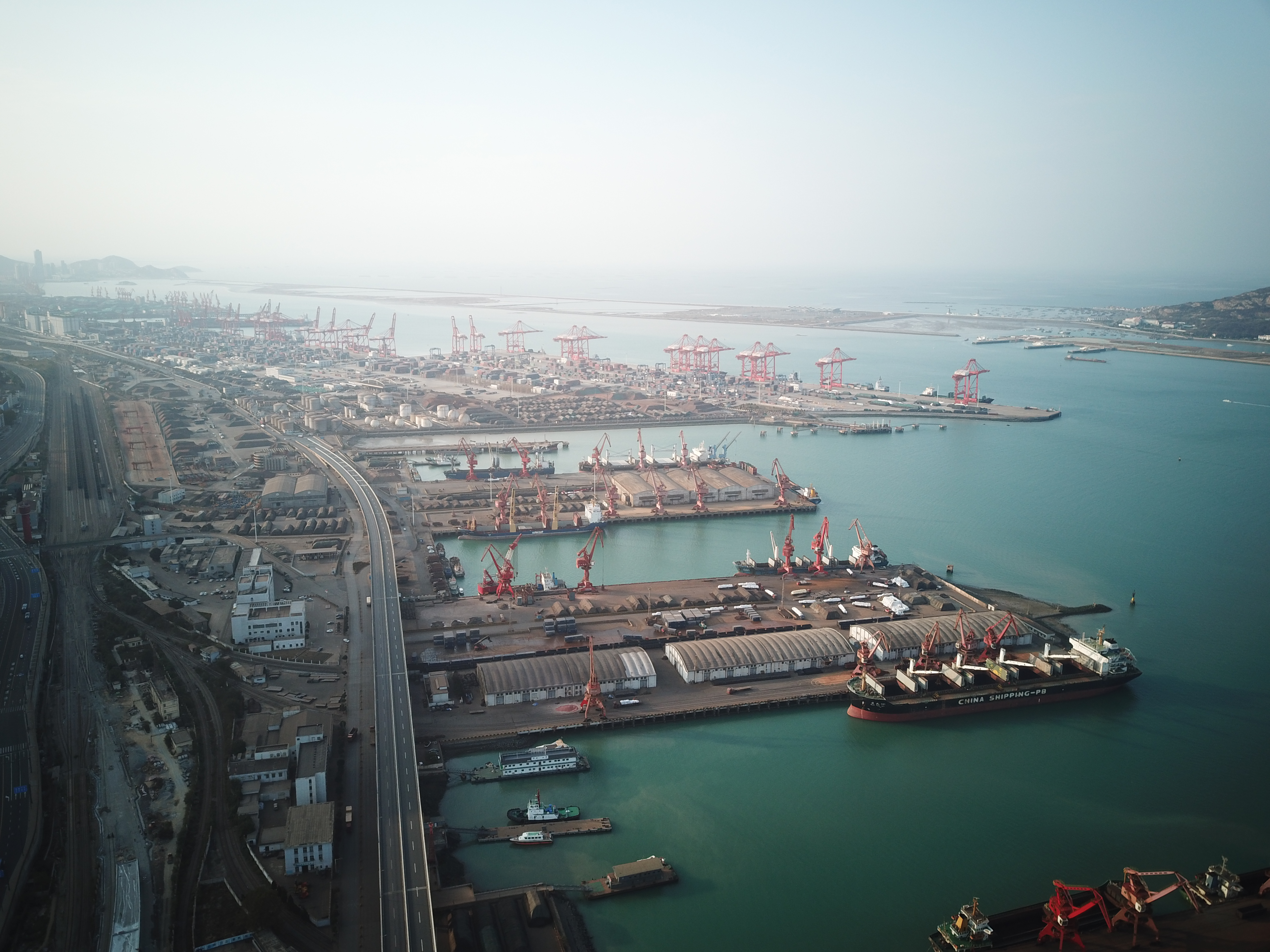
- Aerial view of the Port of Lianyungang
- Interactive map of Port of Lianyungang
- Native name: 连云港港

Location
- Location: Lianyungang, Jiangsu Province, China

Details
- Opened: 1933
- Operated by: Lianyungang Port Group Co., Ltd.
- Type of Harbor: Natural deep-water seaport
- No. of wharfs: 79 seaport berths (10,000+ DWT), 35 inland river berths (1,000+ DWT)
- Draft depth: over 20 meters

Statistics
- Annual cargo tonnage: 320 million tonnes (2023)

The Port of Lianyungang (Chinese: 连云港港) is a major international seaport located on the western shore of the Pacific Ocean, along the coast of the Yellow Sea in eastern China. Situated in Lianyungang, Jiangsu Province, the port lies within a 500-nautical-mile radius of major ports in South Korea and Japan, making it a vital maritime hub in Northeast Asia.

== History ==
The port traces its origins to 1905 with the opening of Dapu Port. Official construction of the Port of Lianyungang began in July 1933. Following the liberation of Lianyungang in 1948, the port was in disrepair and subsequently underwent multiple reconstruction efforts. By 1959, the port had seven berths under 5,000 DWT. Administrative control shifted several times, and in 1961, the Lianyungang Port Administration was placed under the Ministry of Transport.

On February 27, 1973, Premier Zhou Enlai issued a directive to transform the port within three years. Subsequently, a national leadership group led by Su Yu and Gu Mu was formed to oversee port development. A provincial command unit was established in June 1973 to coordinate all construction efforts. Major modernization projects were completed in the 1980s, including the reconstruction of the old port area and core infrastructure. In 2017, the revised master plan for the Xuwei Port Area received formal approval, and new construction commenced on secondary navigation channels.

In March 2021, the Port of Lianyungang was officially designated as an international hub seaport by national authorities. In August 2022, Jiangsu's first 300,000 DWT-class deep-water channel was completed, and full operational use began in September. By December 2023, the second phase of the channel passed final inspection. In July 2024, China COSCO Shipping launched its Northwest America route from the port. In September, the first national open-top container grain train was loaded at the port. Expansion and reconstruction of the port's 300,000-ton channel officially began in November. The Xuwei crude oil terminal was completed in November 2024, and the area passed national inspection for expanded port opening in December.

As of March 2025, the Ministry of Transport approved the use of deep-water shoreline for the reconstruction of Berths 25–27 in Miaoling, Lianyungang Port Area. On April 17, a new route to Indonesia (Lianyungang–Balikpapan–Jakarta) was inaugurated.

== Location and Strategic Role ==
Lianyungang Port plays a pivotal role in China's Belt and Road Initiative. It serves as a logistics cooperation base with Kazakhstan and an ocean access point for the Shanghai Cooperation Organization (SCO) member states.

The port has developed into "one port with four zones": Lianyun, Ganyu, Xuwei, and Guanyun River. The 300,000 DWT channel has a water depth of over 20 meters and accommodates 79 large sea berths and 35 inland berths.

== Infrastructure ==
- Maximum berth capacity: 300,000 DWT
- Channel depth: >20 meters
- Annual design throughput: 199 million tonnes
- Special terminals: crude oil, bulk grain, containers, liquid chemicals
