= APM Terminals =

Maersk's port operation subsidiary

APM Terminals B.V.
- Type: Subsidiary
- Industry: Transportation; Logistics
- Founded: 2001
- Headquarters: The Hague, Netherlands
- Area served: Worldwide
- Key people: Keith Svendsen (CEO)
- Services: Container terminals Port management
- Revenue: US$4.13 billion (2017)
- Owner: A.P. Moller-Maersk
- Number of employees: 22,000 (2022)
- Website: apmterminals.com

APM Terminals is a port operating company headquartered in The Hague, Netherlands. A unit of Danish shipping company Maersk's Transport and Logistics division. It manages container terminals and provides integrated cargo and inland services, operating 74 port and terminal facilities in 38 countries on five continents. They currently have five new port projects in development, including over 100 inland services. The services include providing container transportation, management, maintenance, and repair in 38 countries. In 2018, APM Terminals was ranked the world's fifth-largest container terminal operator.

== History ==
The company's history in terminal operations began a half-century ago with the first Maersk facility, which opened in Brooklyn, in the Port of New York in 1958 to handle general cargoes. In 1975, the group established the Port Authority of New York and New Jersey's first dedicated container terminal, at Berth 51 at Port Elizabeth, New Jersey.

APM Terminals was founded as the port and terminal operating unit of Copenhagen, Denmark-based A.P. Moller - Maersk Group in January 2001. In 2004, APM Terminals moved its headquarters from Copenhagen to The Hague, Netherlands.

The company provides services to more than 60 shipping lines with an integrated global port and container terminal network with interests in 60 facilities and three in development, in 30 countries on five continents. In 2023, APM Terminals generated USD 3.8 billion in revenue. The company’s 22,000 employees serviced more than 27,000 vessel calls and moved 21.7 million containers at both its hub and gateway terminals. As of April 2024, it operated 60 ports and terminals, located in 30 countries. On April 2, 2025, APM Terminals purchased the Panama Canal Railway from Canadian Pacific Kansas City and Mi-Jack Products.

=== Terminal Expansions ===
The following terminals recently completed capacity expansions or are currently under development to increase capacity and efficiency:

APM Terminals Lázaro Cárdenas, Mexico: Phase II expansion started in 2023. This will increase capacity by one million TEUs.

APM Terminals Tangier MedPort, Morocco: One million TEU expansion delivered in 2023, together with electric equipment, shore power, and auto mooring.

Port of Salalah, Oman: One million TEU expansion underway, with completion expected in 2025.

APM Terminals Maasvlakte II, Rotterdam, the Netherlands: Doubling of annual capacity currently underway with completion expected in 2027.

Poti Sea Port, Georgia: Expansion will commence in 2024. The first stage includes a breakwater of 1,700m and a 400m multipurpose quay with 13.5 m depth able to handle dry bulk cargo and an incremental 150,000 TEUs. The second stage will double the annual container capacity at Poti Sea Port to over 1 million TEU.

=== Terminal Divestments ===
In 2022, APM Terminals divested its 30% share in the EUROGATE Container Terminal Wilhelmshaven, Germany, and Sogester container terminals in Luanda and Namibe, Angola. In 2023/2024, APM Terminals divested its operations in Castellón, Spain; Nouakchott and Nouadhibou, Mauritania; Cotonou, Benin; and Conakry, Guinea. The concession agreement for APM Terminals Itajai, Brazil was not renewed in 2023.

=== Decarbonization ===
In 2022, APM Terminals made an industry-leading commitment to be fully net-zero by 2040, and to reduce its scope 1 and 2 emissions by 65% by 2030 compared to 2022. Scope 1 are emissions generated while carrying out business activities, whereas scope 2 covers indirect emissions from purchased energy.

Between 2022 and 2023, APM Terminals reduced its absolute scope 1 and 2 emissions by 13%. Additionally, 40% of electricity demand (as of 2023) was procured from renewable resources.

In 2023, APM Terminals and DP World published a joint white paper emphasizing the importance of electrified container handling equipment to speed up the decarbonization of the industry.

In 2023, to speed up the adoption and understanding of battery electric container handling equipment, APM Terminals commenced a US$60 million electrification pilot programme at the Aqaba Container Terminal, APM Terminals Barcelona, APM Terminals Mobile, Pier 400 Los Angeles and Suez Canal Container Terminal.

APM Terminals also established the Zero Emission Port Alliance during COP28 – an industry-wide strategic coalition with the goal of accelerating container handling equipment electrification.

== Business Operations ==
- Three new terminals commenced operation in 2017: APM Terminals Lázaro Cárdenas (Mexico); APM Terminals Izmir, Turkey; and APM Terminals Quetzal, Guatemala.
- In March 2016 APM Terminals completed the $1 billion acquisition of Spanish-based Grup Maritim TCB's port and rail interests. The acquisition added 8 terminals with a combined 2 million TEU equity-weighted volumes to the APM Terminals Global Terminal Network.
- Meridian Port Services, a joint venture between APM Terminals, Bolloré Africa Logistics, and the Ghana Ports and Harbours Authority, have formalized an agreement to invest $1.5 billion in a new deep-water 3.5 million TEU port and logistics hub in Tema, Ghana.
- Sogester Namibe, an APM Terminals joint venture, signed a 20-year concession to operate, maintain and develop the Port of Moçâmedes in southern Angola, in May 2014. Sogester Container Terminal has been operating at Port of Luanda, the primary port of Angola, since 2007.
- Global Ports, Russia's largest terminal operating company, in which APM Terminals holds a co-controlling share, completed the acquisition of NCC, Russia's second-largest terminal operating company in December 2013.
- In February 2013 APM Terminals and Turkish-based Petkim announced the finalization of plans to develop APM Terminals Izmir near the Port of Izmir, Turkey. The 15.5 meter deep facility opened in 2016 under a 28-year concession, with an initial annual throughput capacity of 1.5 million TEUs.
- In April 2025, APM Terminals purchased the Panama Canal Railway from Canadian Pacific Kansas City and Mi-Jack Products.

== Current New Terminal Development ==
In 2023, the company won a concession for building and operating a container terminal in the Port of Suape, Brazil. Other projects:

- Moín Container Terminal, Costa Rica
- Tema, Ghana
- Abidjan, Ivory Coast
- Vado Ligure, Italy
- Tangier, Morocco

== Expansions and Upgrades of Existing Facilities ==
- Cartagena, Colombia
- Gothenburg, Sweden
- Los Angeles, California
- Mobile, Alabama
- Onne, Nigeria
- Port Elizabeth, New Jersey
- Poti, Republic of Georgia
- Qingdao, China
- Tanjung Pelepas, Malaysia
- Tema, Ghana
- Hai Phong Hateco International Terminal , Vietnam
- Lien Chieu International Port, Da Nang, Vietnam
- Tanger Med 3, Morocco

== Port assets ==
APM Terminals Port terminals
City	Country	Port (Terminal)	Ownership
Aarhus	Denmark	Port of Aarhus (APM Terminals Aarhus)	100%
Abidjan	Côte d'Ivoire	Port of Abidjan (Abidjan Terminal)	
Abidjan	Côte d'Ivoire	Port of Abidjan (Côte d’Ivoire Terminal)	
Algeciras	Spain	Port of Algeciras (APM Terminals Algeciras)	100%
Aqaba	Jordan	Port of Aqaba (Aqaba Container Terminal)	
Al Hidd	Bahrain	Khalifa Bin Salman Port (APM Terminals Bahrain)	100%
Apapa	Nigeria	Apapa Port (APM Terminals Apapa)	100%
Bà Rịa	Vietnam	Cai Mep Port (Cai Mep International Terminal)	
Barcelona	Spain	Port of Barcelona (APM Terminals Barcelona)	100%
Buenaventura	Colombia	Port of Buenaventura (Terminal de Contenedores de Buenaventura)	
Buenos Aires	Argentina	Port of Buenos Aires (APM Terminals Buenos Aires)	100%
Callao	Peru	Port of Callao (APM Terminals Callao)	100%
Colombo	Sri Lanka	Port of Colombo (South Asia Gateway Terminals)	
Fos	France	Marseille-Fos Port (FOS 2XL)	
Gijón	Spain	Port of Gijón (APM Terminals Gijón)	100%
Gothenburg	Sweden	Port of Gothenburg (APM Terminals Gothenburg)	100%
Guangzhou	China	Port of Nansha (Oceangate Container Terminal)	
Iskandar Puteri	Malaysia	Port of Tanjung Pelepas	
Itapoá	Brazil	Port of Itapoá	
Kalundborg	Denmark	Port of Kalundborg (APM Terminals Kalundborg)	100%
Laem Chabang	Thailand	Port of Laem Chabang (LCB Container Terminal 1)	
Lázaro Cárdenas	Mexico	Port of Lázaro Cárdenas (Terminal de Contenedores II)	
Limón	Costa Rica	Moín Container Terminal	
Long Beach	United States	Port of Long Beach (APM Terminals Pier 400 Los Angeles)	100%
Ipojuca	Brazil	Suape Port (APM Terminals Suape)	100%
Miami	United States	Port of Miami (South Florida Container Terminal)	
Mobile	United States	Port of Mobile (APM Terminals Mobile)	100%
Monrovia	Liberia	Freeport of Monrovia (APM Terminals Liberia)	100%
Navi Mumbai	India	Jawaharlal Nehru Port (APM Terminals Mumbai)	100%
New York	United States	Port of New York and New Jersey (APM Terminals Port Elizabeth)	100%
Panama Canal Railway	Panama	Panama Canal	100%
Pointe-Noire	Congo	Port of Pointe-Noire	
Pipavav	India	Port Pipavav (APM Terminals Pipavav)	100%
Port Said	Egypt	East Port Said (Suez Canal Container Terminal)	55%
Port Harcourt	Nigeria	Onne Port Complex (West Africa Container Terminal)	
Poti	Georgia	Port of Poti (APM Terminals Poti)	100%
Progreso	Mexico	Puerto de Altura (APM Terminals Yucatán)	100%
Rijeka	Croatia	Port of Rijeka (Rijeka Gateway)	51%
Qingdao	China	Qingdao Port (Qingdao Qianwan Container Terminal)	
Qingdao	China	Qingdao Port (Qingdao New Qianwan Container Terminal)	
Qingdao	China	Qingdao Port (Qingdao Qianwan United Container Terminal)	
Rotterdam	Netherlands	Port of Rotterdam (APM Terminals Maasvlakte II)	100%
Salalah	Oman	Port of Salalah	
San José	Guatemala	Puerto Quetzal (APM Terminals Puerto Quetzal)	100%
San-Pédro	Ivory Coast	Port of San-Pédro (APM Terminals San Pedro)	100%
Santos	Brazil	Porto of Santos (Brasil Terminal Portuário)	
São Gonçalo do Amarante	Brazil	Port of Pecém (APM Terminals Pecém)	100%
Shanghai	China	Port of Shanghai (Shanghai East Container Terminal)	
Tema	Ghana	Port of Tema (MPS Tema)	
Tianjin	China	Port of Tianjin (Tianjin Port Alliance International Container Terminals)	
Tanger	Morocco	Port of Tanger Med (APM Terminals MedPort Tangier)	100%
Vado Ligure	Italy	Port of Vado Ligure (APM Terminals Vado Ligure)	100%
Valencia	Spain	Port of Valencia (APM Terminals Valencia)	100%
Xiamen	China	Port of Xiamen (Xiamen Songyu Container Terminal)	
Yokohama	Japan	Port of Yokohama (APM Terminals Japan)	100%

== Sustainability ==
APM Terminals’ sustainability initiatives and performance are divided into four core areas: Health, Safety, and Security; Environment; Responsible Business; and Social Responsibility. Significant gains or new major initiatives have been achieved or implemented in each performance category.

There were 141 Lost-Time Injuries (LTI) recorded in the APM Terminals operating portfolio in 2017. This was the lowest number of LTI ever achieved by APM Terminals. The LTI frequency rate (LTIF) for the year was 1.62 per million man-hours worked, slightly higher than the 1.52 recorded in 2016. There were also three fatalities at APM Terminals facilities during the year. A new incident reporting tool was launched across all APM Terminals locations globally in the fourth quarter of 2017. The new tool greatly improves our ability to analyze our data and gain more insight into eliminating risk by utilizing data-driven decisions on where to focus attention going forward.

In 2018, we continue to work to improve our environmental performance specifically and to develop global environmental standards and guidelines. In the area of greenhouse gases and other emissions, APM Terminals has set a goal of a 25% reduction in CO_{2} output, as measured from the base year of 2010. APM Terminals signed a two-year, €5 million ($6.23 million) contract with Amsterdam-based NV Nuon Energy for the supply of environmentally sustainable wind-generated electricity to power the new APM Terminals Maasvlakte II cranes and container handling equipment. The new deep-water terminal, which was officially inaugurated in April 2015, is the world's first container terminal to generate zero greenhouse gases and particulate emissions as compared with diesel-powered terminal machinery. The contract term began on January 1, 2015.

APM Terminals has embarked on a program to convert and retrofit more than 400 Rubber-Tire Gantry Cranes (RTGs) in use throughout the APM Terminals global port, terminal, and inland services network to a combination electric and diesel power as a measure to reduce both costs and emission of carbon dioxide (CO_{2}) from the current diesel-powered RTG fleet. RTGs, which are used to move loaded and unloaded containers at the terminals, are usually powered by diesel engines. The new power supply will be a combination of electricity and diesel, utilizing a busbar- a rail providing access to electrical power. Recent technological advances have made such a hybrid power option possible for RTGs. The use of E-RTGs will reduce CO_{2} emissions by between 60-80% compared with conventional diesel-powered RTGs, which will result in overall terminal CO_{2} emissions decreasing by 20% per TEU handled. The retro-fitting of the majority of the existing 400-unit APM Terminals RTG fleet will eliminate 70,000 tons of CO_{2} emissions annually.

== See also ==
- Containerization
- Dock (maritime)
