= 2007 Kroger 200 (IRP) =

Race details
- Map of Speedway
- Date: July 28, 2007
- Official name: 2007 Kroger 200
- Location: Indianapolis Raceway Park in Brownsburg, Indiana
- Course: Short track
- Course length: 0.686 miles (1.104 km)
- Distance: 200 laps, 137.2 mi (220.801 km)
- Weather: Clear
- Average speed: 80.143 mph (128.978 km/h)
- Attendance: 40,000

Pole position
Driver	Aric Almirola	Joe Gibbs Racing
- Time: 22.481

Most laps led
Driver	Greg Biffle	Roush Racing
- Laps: 94

Winner
No. 38	Jason Leffler	Braun Racing

Television in the United States
- Network: ESPN2
- Announcers: Marty Reid, Randy LaJoie

The 2007 Kroger 200 was a NASCAR Busch Series race held at Indianapolis Raceway Park in Brownsburg, Indiana on July 28, 2007. The race was the 26th iteration of the event and the 22nd race of the 2007 NASCAR Busch Series. Aric Almirola won the pole and led the 2nd most laps at 87 behind Greg Biffle who led the most laps at 94. But it was Jason Leffler who scored a historic upset victory giving the new first year manufacture Toyota its first ever NASCAR Busch Series victory.

== Background ==
Lucas Oil Indianapolis Raceway Park (formerly Indianapolis Raceway Park, O'Reilly Raceway Park at Indianapolis, and Lucas Oil Raceway) is an auto racing facility in Brownsburg, Indiana, about 10 miles (16 km) northwest of downtown Indianapolis. It includes a 0.686-mile (1.104 km) oval track, a 2.5-mile (4.0 km) road course (which has fallen into disrepair and is no longer used), and a 4,400-foot (1,300 m) drag strip which is among the premier drag racing venues in the world. The complex receives about 500,000 visitors annually.

=== Entry list ===
- (R) denotes rookie driver

#	Driver	Team	Make
00	Mike Potter	D.D.L. Motorsports	Chevrolet
0	Eric McClure	D.D.L Motorsports	Chevrolet
01	Shelby Howard	D.D.L. Motorsports	Chevrolet
1	Kertus Davis	Phoenix Racing	Chevrolet
05	Brett Rowe	Day Enterprise Racing	Chevrolet
6	Erik Darnell	Roush Racing	Ford
7	Mike Wallace	Phoenix Racing	Chevrolet
08	Jason White	Pennington Motorsports	Dodge
9	Deac McCaskill	Gillett Evernham Motorsports	Dodge
10	Mike Bliss	Braun Racing	Toyota
14	Kyle Krisiloff (R)	Carl A. Haas Motorsports	Ford
16	Greg Biffle	Roush Racing	Ford
18	Brad Coleman (R)	Joe Gibbs Racing	Chevrolet
19	Brian Keselowski	Whitney Motorsports	Dodge
20	Aric Almirola	Joe Gibbs Racing	Chevrolet
21	Tim McCreadie	Richard Childress Racing	Chevrolet
22	Josh Wise	Fitz Racing	Dodge
24	Landon Cassill	Hendrick Motorsports	Chevrolet
25	Richard Johns	Team Rensi Motorsports	Ford
27	Jason Keller	Brewco Motorsports	Ford
28	Robert Richardson Jr.	Jay Robinson Racing	Chevrolet
29	Brandon Miller	Richard Childress Racing	Chevrolet
30	Danny O'Quinn Jr.	SKI Motorsports	Chevrolet
33	Cale Gale	Kevin Harvick Inc.	Chevrolet
35	Bobby Hamilton Jr.	Team Rensi Motorsports	Ford
36	Brent Sherman	McGill Motorsports	Chevrolet
37	Bobby East	Brewco Motorsports	Ford
38	Jason Leffler	Braun Racing	Toyota
41	Scott Lagasse Jr.	Chip Ganassi Racing	Dodge
42	Kevin Hamlin	Chip Ganassi Racing	Dodge
44	Mike Harmon	Mike Harmon Racing	Chevrolet
47	Kelly Bires	Wood Brothers Racing/JTG Racing	Ford
49	Derrike Cope	Jay Robinson Racing	Chevrolet
52	Brad Teague	Means Racing	Ford
56	Frank Kreyer	Mac Hill Motorsports	Chevrolet
59	Marcos Ambrose (R)	Wood Brothers Racing/JTG Racing	Ford
60	Travis Kvapil	Roush Racing	Ford
66	Steve Wallace	Rusty Wallace Inc.	Dodge
72	D. J. Kennington	MacDonald Motorsports	Dodge
77	Ron Hornaday Jr.	Kevin Harvick Inc.	Chevrolet
88	Brad Keselowski (R)	JR Motorsports	Chevrolet
89	Morgan Shepherd	Faith Motorsports	Dodge
90	Stephen Leicht	Robert Yates Racing	Ford
99	Mark Green	Michael Waltrip Racing	Toyota
Official Entry list

== Qualifying ==
Aric Almirola won the pole for the race with a time of 22.481 and a speed of 109.853.

Grid	No.	Driver	Team	Manufacturer	Time	Speed
1	20	Aric Almirola	Joe Gibbs Racing	Chevrolet	22.481	109.853
2	6	David Ragan (R)** ***	Roush Racing	Ford	22.576	109.391
3	77	Ron Hornaday	Kevin Harvick Inc.	Chevrolet	22.582	109.361
4	47	Kelly Bires	Wood Brothers/JTG Racing	Ford	22.641	109.076
5	38	Jason Leffler	Braun Racing	Toyota	22.726	108.668
6	99	David Reutimann** ***	Michael Waltrip Racing	Toyota	22.745	108.578
7	90	Stephen Leicht	Robert Yates Racing	Ford	22.795	108.340
8	60	Carl Edwards** ***	Roush Racing	Ford	22.797	108.330
9	18	Brad Coleman (R)	Joe Gibbs Racing	Chevrolet	22.805	108.292
10	16	Greg Biffle	Roush Racing	Ford	22.815	108.245
11	01	Shelby Howard	D.D.L. Motorsports	Chevrolet	22.823	108.207
12	41	Scott Lagasse Jr.	Chip Ganassi Racing	Dodge	22.834	108.155
13	27	Jason Keller	Brewco Motorsports	Ford	22.854	108.060
14	1	J. J. Yeley** ***	Phoenix Racing	Chevrolet	22.854	108.060
15	88	Brad Keselowski (R)	JR Motorsports	Chevrolet	22.868	107.994
16	29	Scott Wimmer** ***	Richard Childress Racing	Chevrolet	22.873	107.970
17	21	Tim McCreadie	Richard Childress Racing	Chevrolet	22.889	107.895
18	33	Cale Gale	Kevin Harvick Inc.	Chevrolet	22.900	107.843
19	7	Mike Wallace	Phoenix Racing	Chevrolet	22.909	107.800
20	37	Bobby East	Brewco Motorsports	Ford	22.912	107.786
21	36	Brent Sherman	McGill Motorsports	Chevrolet	22.959	107.566
22	10	Mike Bliss	Braun Racing	Toyota	22.969	107.519
23	24	Landon Cassill	Hendrick Motorsports	Chevrolet	22.976	107.486
24	59	Marcos Ambrose (R)	Wood Brothers/JTG Racing	Ford	22.979	107.472
25	66	Steve Wallace	Rusty Wallace Inc.	Dodge	22.991	107.416
26	19	Brian Keselowski	Whitney Motorsports	Dodge	22.995	107.397
27	25	Richard Johns	Team Rensi Motorsports	Ford	23.007	107.341
28	35	Bobby Hamilton Jr.	Team Rensi Motorsports	Ford	23.015	107.304
29	22	Josh Wise	Fitz Racing	Dodge	23.037	107.201
30	42	Kevin Hamlin***	Chip Ganassi Racing	Dodge	23.053	107.127
31	30	Danny O'Quinn Jr.	SKI Motorsports	Chevrolet	23.081	106.997
32	14	Kyle Krisiloff (R)	Carl A. Haas Motorsports	Ford	23.178	106.549
33	89	Morgan Shepherd***	Faith Motorsports	Dodge	23.272	106.119
34	72	D. J. Kennington	MacDonald Motorsports	Dodge	23.414	105.475
35	0	Eric McClure	D.D.L. Motorsports	Chevrolet	23.467	105.237
36	56	Frank Kreyer	Mac Hill Motorsports	Chevrolet	23.508	105.054
37	49	Derrike Cope	Jay Robinson Racing	Chevrolet	23.529	104.960
38	05	Brett Rowe***	Day Enterprise Racing	Chevrolet	23.729	104.075
39	52	Brad Teague	Means Racing	Ford	23.848	103.556
40	28	Robert Richardson Jr.	Jay Robinson Racing	Chevrolet	23.858	103.512
41	44	Mike Harmon	Mike Harmon Racing	Chevrolet	23.862	103.495
42	9	Deac McCaskill*	Gillett Evernham Motorsports	Dodge	—	—
43	08	Jason White	Pennington Motorsports	Dodge	23.864	103.486
Failed to qualify, withdrew, or driver changes
44	00	Mike Potter	D.D.L. Motorsports	Chevrolet	23.980	102.986
DC	1	Kertus Davis	Phoenix Racing	Chevrolet	—	—
DC	6	Erik Darnell	Roush Racing	Ford	—	—
DC	29	Brandon Miller	Richard Childress Racing	Chevrolet	—	—
DC	60	Travis Kvapil	Roush Racing	Ford	—	—
DC	99	Mark Green	Michael Waltrip Racing	Toyota	—	—
Official Starting grid

* – Made the field via owners points

** – There were 5 different driver changes by Raceday as there were drivers qualifying the cars for the Cup Series drivers. Kertus Davis qualified for J. J. Yeley, Erik Darnell qualified for David Ragan, Brandon Miller qualified for Scott Wimmer, Travis Kvapil qualified for Carl Edwards, and Mark Green qualified for David Reutimann. This was during the peak of the Buschwhacker era where Cup Series drivers would drive in the Busch Series and would ask for other drivers to qualify their Busch Series car while they tried to qualify the Cup Series race which would be the Brickyard 400 at the Indianapolis Motor Speedway.

*** – David Ragan, David Reutimann, Carl Edwards, J. J. Yeley, Scott Wimmer, Kevin Hamlin, Morgan Shepherd, and Brett Rowe all had to go to the rear of the field. Ragan, Reutimann, Edwards, Yeley, and Wimmer all had driver changes, Hamlin had unapproved impound adjustment, Shepherd had an engine change, and Rowe missed the drivers meeting.

== Race ==
Pole sitter Aric Almirola led the first lap of the race. The first caution of the race flew on lap 14 when Landon Cassill crashed in turns 1 and 2 after he got spun by Steve Wallace. During the caution period, some drivers pitted. On pit road, a scary accident occurred. Ron Hornaday went in to pit and one of his tire carriers went out there but went a bit too far out and got clipped by the oncoming Richard Johns, whose stall was two ahead of Hornaday. The contact sent the crew member to flip onto his head while the tire landed on Johns' roof. Fortunately, the crew guy was not severely hurt. The race would restart on lap 19. On lap 44, the second caution would fly when David Ragan crashed in turn 4 after he got spun by Josh Wise. Bobby East and Ron Hornaday did not pit and East led the field to the restart on lap 51. On the restart, Hornaday took the lead from East. On lap 55, Aric Almirola took the lead. On lap 69, the third caution flew when Scott Lagasse Jr. came up in front of Brad Coleman down the frontstretch and Coleman hooked Lagasse and both went into the outside wall. The race would restart on lap 74. On lap 96, the 4th caution would fly when Brett Rowe blew a right front tire and hit the outside wall in turns 3 and 4. Greg Biffle won the race off of pit road but Deac McCaskill, Brian Keselowski, and D. J. Kennington did not pit and McCaskill led the field to the restart on lap 102. On the next lap, Greg Biffle would take the lead from McCaskill.

=== Final laps ===
On lap 140, the 5th caution would fly when Richard Johns hit the outside wall in turns 1 and 2. The race would restart on lap 145. But on lap 146, the 6th caution would fly when Deac McCaskill crashed in turn 4 after getting spun by Landon Cassill. The race would restart with 51 laps to go. With 45 to go, the 7th caution flew when Deac McCaskill crashed again in almost the same spot as before. The race would restart with 37 laps to go. With 36 to go, Carl Edwards challenged his teammate Biffle for the lead. Biffle raced side by side with Edwards for a lot of laps and Edwards got the lead change with 33 to go but could not pass Biffle and ended up falling back to 4th after he got passed by David Reutimann and Jason Leffler with around 26 to go. It looked like Biffle was gonna hold off everyone and win after Reutimann and Leffler began to fight hard with each other for 2nd place. Leffler and Reutimann even made contact a few times before Leffler got passed Reutimann with 13 to go and Leffler began to close in on Biffle. It looked like it was going to be almost a photo finish between Biffle and Leffler. But with 9 to go, the 8th and final caution flew when Josh Wise spun down the frontstretch. The race would restart with 5 laps to go in the race. With 4 to go, Biffle's car slid high in turns 1 and 2 giving Leffler a shot to take the lead from him. Leffler fought hard with Biffle for the lead and with 3 to go, Leffler passed Biffle for the lead. Biffle tried to catch him but Leffler began to pull away and Jason Leffler won the race. This would the third and final time a non Cup Series driver won a Busch Series race in 2007. The win would make NASCAR history as it would be Leffler's second and final career Busch Series win, but it would also be Toyota's first ever Busch Series win as a manufacturer. Since this win, Toyota has won 196 races as of 2023, 91 of those wins coming from Kyle Busch from 2008 to 2022. Greg Biffle, David Reutimann, Carl Edwards, and Ron Hornaday rounded out the top 5 while Aric Almirola, Scott Wimmer, Kevin Hamlin, Mike Bliss, and Brad Keselowski rounded out the top 10.

== Race results ==
Pos	Car	Driver	Team	Manufacturer	Laps Run	Laps Led	Status	Points
1	38	Jason Leffler	Braun Racing	Toyota	200	3	running	190
2	16	Greg Biffle	Roush Racing	Ford	200	94	running	180
3	99	David Reutimann	Michael Waltrip Racing	Toyota	200	0	running	165
4	60	Carl Edwards	Roush Racing	Ford	200	1	running	165
5	77	Ron Hornaday	Kevin Harvick Inc.	Chevrolet	200	5	running	160
6	20	Aric Almirola	Joe Gibbs Racing	Chevrolet	200	87	running	155
7	29	Scott Wimmer	Richard Childress Racing	Chevrolet	200	0	running	146
8	42	Kevin Hamlin	Chip Ganassi Racing	Dodge	200	0	running	142
9	10	Mike Bliss	Braun Racing	Toyota	200	0	running	138
10	88	Brad Keselowski (R)	JR Motorsports	Chevrolet	200	0	running	134
11	27	Jason Keller	Brewco Motorsports	Ford	200	0	running	130
12	21	Tim McCreadie	Richard Childress Racing	Chevrolet	200	0	running	127
13	35	Bobby Hamilton Jr.	Team Rensi Motorsports	Ford	200	0	running	124
14	33	Cale Gale	Kevin Harvick Inc.	Chevrolet	200	0	running	121
15	25	Richard Johns	Team Rensi Motorsports	Ford	200	0	running	118
16	1	J. J. Yeley	Phoenix Racing	Chevrolet	200	0	running	115
17	66	Steve Wallace	Rusty Wallace Inc.	Dodge	200	0	running	112
18	6	David Ragan (R)	Roush Racing	Ford	200	0	running	109
19	22	Josh Wise	Fitz Racing	Dodge	200	0	running	106
20	7	Mike Wallace	Phoenix Racing	Chevrolet	200	0	running	103
21	14	Kyle Krisiloff (R)	Carl A. Haas Motorsports	Ford	200	0	running	100
22	30	Danny O'Quinn Jr.	SKI Motorsports	Chevrolet	200	0	running	97
23	19	Brian Keselowski	Whitney Motorsports	Dodge	200	0	running	94
24	90	Stephen Leicht	Robert Yates Racing	Ford	200	0	running	91
25	72	D. J. Kennington	MacDonald Motorsports	Dodge	199	0	running	88
26	08	Jason White	Pennington Motorsports	Dodge	197	0	running	85
27	28	Robert Richardson Jr.	Jay Robinson Racing	Chevrolet	196	0	running	82
28	56	Frank Kreyer	Mac Hill Motorsports	Chevrolet	195	0	running	79
29	0	Eric McClure	D.D.L. Motorsports	Chevrolet	193	0	running	76
30	24	Landon Cassill	Hendrick Motorsports	Chevrolet	192	0	running	73
31	18	Brad Coleman (R)	Joe Gibbs Racing	Chevrolet	190	0	running	70
32	59	Marcos Ambrose (R)	Wood Brothers/JTG Racing	Ford	174	0	running	67
33	36	Brent Sherman	McGill Motorsports	Chevrolet	170	0	running	64
34	41	Scott Lagasse Jr.	Chip Ganassi Racing	Dodge	160	0	running	61
35	9	Deac McCaskill	Gillett Evernham Motorsports	Dodge	153	5	crash	63
36	01	Shelby Howard	D.D.L. Motorsports	Chevrolet	143	0	suspension	55
37	05	Brett Rowe	Day Enterprise Motorsports	Chevrolet	94	0	suspension	52
38	47	Kelly Bires	Wood Brothers/JTG Racing	Ford	82	1	engine	54
39	37	Bobby East	Brewco Motorsports	Ford	74	4	crash	51
40	89	Morgan Shepherd	Faith Motorsports	Dodge	34	0	engine	43
41	49	Derrike Cope	Jay Robinson Racing	Dodge	30	0	overheating	40
42	52	Brad Teague	Means Racing	Ford	23	0	transmission	37
43	44	Mike Harmon	Mike Harmon Racing	Chevrolet	6	0	brakes	34
Official Race results

Previous race: 2007 Gateway 250	NASCAR Busch Series; 2007 season	Next race: 2007 NAPA Auto Parts 200
