= 2007 NAPA Auto Parts 200 =

Race details
- Map of Speedway
- Date: August 4, 2007
- Official name: 2007 NAPA Auto Parts 2007
- Location: Circuit Gilles Villeneuve in Montreal, Quebec
- Course: Permanent racing facility
- Course length: 2.709 miles (4.360 km)
- Distance: 75 laps, 203.175 mi (326.978 km)
- Scheduled distance: 74 laps, 200.466 mi (322.619 km)
- Weather: Sunny
- Average speed: 64.671 mph (104.078 km/h)
- Attendance: 68,150

Pole position
Driver	Patrick Carpentier	Fitz Racing
- Time: 1:42.086

Most laps led
Driver	Marcos Ambrose	Wood Brothers Racing/JTG Racing
- Laps: 37

Winner
No. 21	Kevin Harvick	Richard Childress Racing

Television in the United States
- Network: ESPN2
- Announcers: Allen Bestwick, Randy LaJoie

The 2007 NAPA Auto Parts 200 was a NASCAR Busch Series race held at Circuit Gilles Villeneuve in Montreal, Quebec on August 4, 2007. The race was the inaugural iteration of the event while being the first NASCAR race to be held in Canada since 1952. Held over 75 laps, it was the 23rd race of the 2007 NASCAR Busch Series season. Fellow Canadian Patrick Carpentier won the pole while Marcos Ambrose led the most laps. But the race was most remembered for a controversial finish between Ambrose and Robby Gordon that resulted in Kevin Harvick winning the race in the end.

== Background ==
The Circuit Gilles Villeneuve, also spelled Circuit Gilles-Villeneuve (French pronunciation: [siʁ.kɥi ʒil vilnœv]), is a 4.360 km (2.709 mi) motor racing circuit on Notre Dame Island in Montreal, Quebec, Canada. It is the venue for the FIA Formula One Canadian Grand Prix. It has previously hosted the FIA World Sportscar Championship, the Champ Car World Series (Grand Prix of Montreal), the NASCAR Pinty’s Series, the NASCAR Xfinity Series (NAPA Auto Parts 200), and the Grand-Am Rolex Sports Car Series.

== Race ==
Pole sitter Patrick Carpentier led the first lap of the race. The first incident of the race that did not result in a caution occurred on lap 3 when Niclas Jönsson pushed Michel Jourdain Jr. and Jourdain got into the back of Ron Hornaday and Hornaday spun in turn 10. The spin sent Jorge Goeters through the infield grass to avoid and had Andy Lally almost hit Hornaday in the process. On lap 7, Boris Said took the lead from Carpentier. Around that time, green flag pitstops began. Said pitted on lap 11 which gave the lead to Ron Fellows. Fellows pitted on lap 13 and gave the lead to back to Carpentier. Carpentier pitted on lap 16 and gave the lead to Niclas Jönsson. Jönsson pitted on lap 19 and after everything had cycled through, Scott Pruett was the new leader. On lap 28, rookie Marcos Ambrose took the lead from Pruett. On lap 31, the first caution flew for oil on the track. During the caution, Steve Wallace's engine started to sputter and leak oil and caused him to go off track in turn 2 and just barely hit the wall due to the oil under his tires and gave damage to his left front. The race would restart on lap 35 with Ambrose leading. On lap 36, the second caution flew when Steve Wallace's engine let go off of turn 10. Kevin Harvick won the race off of pit road but Patrick Carpentier, Boris Said, Niclas Jönsson, Jorge Goeters, Brad Coleman, Stephen Leicht, Kyle Krisiloff, and Todd Kluever did not pit and Carpentier led the field to the restart on lap 41.

=== Final laps and controversy ===
With 29 to go, Niclas Jönsson took the lead after Carpentier pitted. With 27 to go, Jönsson pitted and gave the lead to Marcos Ambrose. But Jönsson's chances of winning vanished as he had a catch can violation and had to do a drive through. Ambrose was looking for his first ever win in all of NASCAR in his 23rd Busch Series start which would be perfect for him since Ambrose was a veteran at the road courses after he drove in Supercars from 2001–2005. But with 17 to go, Jorge Goeters spun in turn 1 and would eventually bring out the caution for the 3rd time when his car stalled in turn 2. During that time, his teammate at Brewco Motorsports Greg Biffle went off track in turn 10 and into the gravel traps but was able to get his car going with no incident. The race would restart with 13 laps to go with Ambrose leading. At around 9 to go, two incidents occurred. The first being when Patrick Carpentier spun in turn 2 after contact with Brad Coleman with the second being when Scott Pruett spun in turn 10 while racing with Ron Fellows. With 8 to go, the 4th caution would fly when Boris Said's engine blew. Before the caution, Robby Gordon made his way up to second passing Fellows which had a chance to see two road course veterans in Ambrose and Gordon battle it out. The race would restart with 4 laps to go. But on the restart, the controversy would begin. The 5th and final caution would fly for a 6 car crash in turn 2 when Kevin Harvick came up into Scott Pruett after Pruett made contact with Harvick in turn 1 almost sending him off the track and Pruett spun up into Ron Fellows and both of them spun. The wreck also collected Ron Hornaday, Jeff Burton, and Brad Coleman after Hornaday and Coleman went too far off track off of turn 1 and ended up running into the pile up. Meanwhile, Robby Gordon battled Ambrose for the lead. Before the caution flew, Gordon had passed Ambrose for the lead and was ready to slow down for the caution after they went through turns 3 and 4 but Ambrose got into the back of Gordon off of turn 4 and turned Gordon around during the caution. An angry Gordon would speed back up and catch up to Ambrose and showed his displeasure by hitting him in the door during the caution. The wreck would set up a green-white-checkered finish extending the race by a lap. But during the caution is where controversy ensued. NASCAR's rule states that "when the caution comes out, the field is immediately frozen" which means whatever position the cars were at during the caution stays in that position. The rule was implemented at the end of the 2003 season. The rule also stated that "if you don't maintain pace car speed, you lose your position" which wouldn't be for Gordon since he got intentionally spun out by Ambrose during the caution. This means Robby Gordon should be the race leader. But for some reason, NASCAR said Robby Gordon did not maintain pace car speed and should be placed back in the 12th position (Robby later said he was forced to go back to 17th). It confused a lot of people as they saw Ambrose dump Gordon during the caution and thought Gordon was the leader. Instead of listening to NASCAR, Robby Gordon refused to go back and decided to keep his car in the second position behind Marcos Ambrose. That should have been a black flag by NASCAR. Instead, NASCAR decides to throw the green flag and restart the race with Gordon still holding his car in the second position. Eventually, both Ambrose and Gordon went through the first turn and Gordon would be able to get his revenge on Ambrose as Gordon got into the rear of Ambrose, turned Ambrose around in turn 2, and ran off towards the sunset with the lead, or so he thought. Instead, NASCAR decided to disqualify Robby Gordon and not score him for the last two laps after 73 laps ran by Gordon and said Gordon is not the leader which meant the car that was behind Gordon on the restart in Andy Pilgrim was the new leader. Eventually, Pilgrim would get passed by Kevin Harvick for the lead after Pilgrim got loose off of turn 3. Harvick had a challenger in Niclas Jönsson before Jönsson got loose and got passed by Patrick Carpentier for second. Carpentier tried to pass Harvick in the last two laps but couldn't and Kevin Harvick won the first ever race in Montreal and Carpentier finished in second. Max Papis, Ron Fellows, and Stephen Leicht rounded out the top 5 while Kyle Krisiloff, Marcos Ambrose, Brad Coleman, David Reutimann, and Jeff Burton rounded out the top 10.

Despite being scored in 18th, Robby Gordon decided to do burnouts with Harvick claiming he was the race winner even though he was disqualified. In his interview, Gordon quoted "If you want to know my opinion, I won the race. I completed all the laps, and if you seen this happen before, guys get spun out when they slow down that's exactly what happened with Marcos. He spun me when I slowed down, and they tell me I'm gonna back to 17th. It's not the way it is. It's happened many times– they set the precedence before, and we'll appeal it. We won the race." NASCAR suspended Robby Gordon for the Cup Series race at Pocono the following day replaced by P. J. Jones, fined $60,000, and placed on probation until the end of the year. Eventually, Gordon would make it up to Ambrose and allowed Ambrose to attempt to qualify for the Watkins Glen Cup race the following week in his No. 77 RGM car which Ambrose failed to make. In 2010, Gordon announced he was going to compete in the Montreal race and he also announced he decided to make himself a banner and a makeshift trophy similar to the one from the race to claim he won the 2007 NAPA 200. When asked about how he was going to recover in that race, Gordon chuckled and said "You mean since I won? We've still got the banner hanging on our wall. We came back for redemption, and we'll do the best job we can."

== Race results ==
Information for table below from Racing Reference Info.

Final	Starting	Car	Driver	Team	Manufacturer	Laps Run	Laps Led	Status	Points
1	30	21	Kevin Harvick	Richard Childress Racing	Chevrolet	75	2	running	190
2	1	22	Patrick Carpentier	Fitz Racing	Dodge	75	14	running	150 (Note: Carpentier was docked 25 drivers points for a non-approved adjustment)
3	2	1	Max Papis	Phoenix Racing	Chevrolet	75	0	running	165
4	3	33	Ron Fellows	Kevin Harvick Inc.	Chevrolet	75	4	running	165
5	9	90	Stephen Leicht	Robert Yates Racing	Ford	75	0	running	155
6	20	14	Kyle Krisiloff (R)	Carl A. Haas Motorsports	Ford	75	0	running	150
7	5	59	Marcos Ambrose (R)	Wood Brothers/JTG Racing	Ford	75	37	running	156
8	17	18	Brad Coleman (R)	Joe Gibbs Racing	Chevrolet	75	0	running	142
9	29	99	David Reutimann	Michael Waltrip Racing	Toyota	75	0	running	138
10	33	29	Jeff Burton	Richard Childress Racing	Chevrolet	75	0	running	134
11	19	20	Aric Almirola	Joe Gibbs Racing	Chevrolet	75	0	running	130
12	8	28	Niclas Jönsson	Jay Robinson Racing	Chevrolet	75	5	running	132
13	6	77	Ron Hornaday	Kevin Harvick Inc.	Chevrolet	75	0	running	124
14	7	41	Scott Pruett	Chip Ganassi Racing	Dodge	75	9	running	126
15	14	88	Andy Pilgrim	JR Motorsports	Chevrolet	74	0	crash	118
16	10	17	Michel Jourdain Jr.	Roush Racing	Ford	74	0	running	115
17	23	30	Stanton Barrett	SKI Motorsports	Chevrolet	74	0	running	112
18	11	55	Robby Gordon	Robby Gordon Motorsports	Ford	73	0	running	109
19	22	6	David Ragan (R)	Roush Racing	Ford	73	0	running	106
20	26	37	Greg Biffle	Brewco Motorsports	Ford	73	0	running	103
21	31	16	Todd Kluever	Roush Racing	Ford	73	0	running	100
22	25	36	Brent Sherman	McGill Motorsports	Chevrolet	73	0	running	97
23	32	10	John Graham	Braun Racing	Toyota	72	0	running	94
24	34	35	Bobby Hamilton Jr.	Team Rensi Motorsports	Ford	72	0	running	91
25	39	25	Richard Johns	Team Rensi Motorsports	Ford	72	0	running	88
26	18	38	Jason Leffler	Braun Racing	Toyota	71	0	running	85
27	28	7	Mike Wallace	Phoenix Racing	Chevrolet	70	0	running	82
28	4	9	Boris Said	Gillett Evernham Motorsports	Dodge	66	4	engine	84
29	13	47	Andy Lally	Wood Brothers/JTG Racing	Ford	65	0	transmission	76
30	15	60	Carl Edwards	Roush Racing	Ford	65	0	running	73
31	12	27	Jorge Goeters	Brewco Motorsports	Ford	57	0	crash	70
32	16	66	Steve Wallace	Rusty Wallace Inc.	Dodge	34	0	engine	67
33	37	63	Mike MacKenzie	Jeff Spraker Racing	Chevrolet	25	0	transmission	64
34	21	42	Michael Valiante	Chip Ganassi Racing	Dodge	24	0	transmission	61
35	41	71	Trevor Boys	MacDonald Motorsports	Chevrolet	24	0	transmission	58
36	24	98	Alex García	Transnet Racing	Chevrolet	18	0	engine	55
37	27	72	D. J. Kennington	MacDonald Motorsports	Dodge	14	0	transmission	52
38	40	89	Morgan Shepherd	Faith Motorsports	Dodge	7	0	brakes	49
39	38	52	Scott Gaylord	Means Racing	Ford	5	0	brakes	46
40	35	44	Mark Green (i)	Fitz Racing	Dodge	4	0	electrical	0
41	36	01	Joe Fox	D.D.L. Motorsports	Chevrolet	3	0	overheating	40
42	43	76	Jerick Johnson	Team Johnson Racing	Chevrolet	3	0	rear end	37
43	42	0	J. R. Fitzpatrick	D.D.L. Motorsports	Chevrolet	0	0	electrical	34
Official Race results

=== Failed to qualify ===
Three drivers were replaced before the race: Brandon Miller, Scott Wimmer and Casey Atwood.

== Notes ==
Previous race: 2007 Kroger 200	NASCAR Busch Series; 2007 season	Next race: 2007 Zippo 200 at the Glen
