= Suez Canal Container Terminal =

Suez Canal Container Terminal SCCT
- Company type: Private
- Industry: Transport, Terminals
- Founded: 2000
- Headquarters: Port Fuad, Egypt
- Key people: Lars Vang Christensen (CEO); Mahmoud Ayoub (COO)
- Website: http://www.scct.com.eg/ 31°12′41.18″N 32°21′25.60″E

Suez Canal Container Terminal (SCCT) (Arabic: شركة قناة السويس للحاويات) is a container terminal located at Port Said East and functions as a transshipment centre for the Eastern Mediterranean at the northern entrance to the Suez Canal. The terminal has been operational since October 2004. Suez Canal Container Terminal (SCCT) is a private joint venture company that obtained the concession to build, operate, and manage this new terminal.

The majority (55%) shareholding of SCCT is held by APM Terminals. 20% of the shares are held by COSCO, 10% are held by Suez Canal & Affiliates, 5% by the National Bank of Egypt (NBE), and the remaining 10% are held by the Egyptian private sector.

== History ==
The Egyptian government signed a concession agreement for a term of 30 years in relation to the need for a container terminal in Port Said. In 2002, Egypt ratified an additional concession agreement, following earlier approval of terminal design in 2001.

Construction on the SCCT first started in 2003, and a target date of October 1 of the following year was established. The Suez Canal Container Terminal became operational in October 2004.

In 2007, the Egyptian government signed a concession agreement for the progression of "Phase II" of the SCCT facility.

== See also ==
- APM Terminals
- A. P. Moller-Maersk Group
- Port Said Port Authority
