= Gantrex Group =

Belgian engineering company

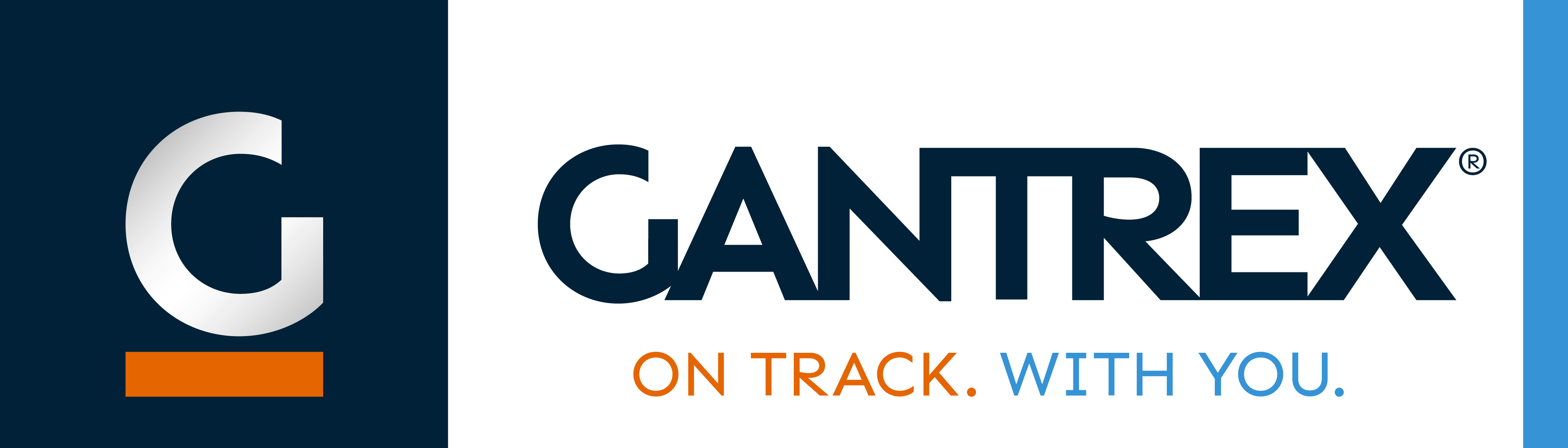
- Founded: 1971
- Founder: Haegelsteen Family
- Headquarters: Nivelles, Belgium
- Area served: Global
- Key people: Maarten Impens (CEO)
- Owner: Argos Wityu and Management (100%)
- Website: https://gantrex.com

Gantrex Group is an engineering company specializing in crane rail systems and rail fastening technologies. It is headquartered in Nivelles, Belgium.

== Overview ==
Gantrex was founded under the name ‘Gantry Railing Continental’ in 1971 in Belgium by the Haegelsteen Family. In 2015, the majority of Gantrex shares were bought by Argos Wityu, a French investment fund. In February 2022, Gantrex Group signed a Share Purchase Agreement to acquire 100 percent of the shares of Bravo Silva Consultoria Tecnica S.L (ABS Consultor) in Spain. In February 2024, the Gantrex Group acquired Liftcom, a Dutch Port Crane Services company, focusing on inspecting, maintaining, repairing, and moving of new and operational port equipment.

Gantrex Group develops and produces crane rail systems and provides Port Crane Services. Also, the company offers a broad spectrum of products like steel supports, rubber products, and cable protection systems, and crane parts. Gantrex has filed over 100 global patents, including the RailLok system which uses rubber elements for the mounting of rails, reducing wear of girders.

Gantrex Group focuses on the global port industry, supplying materials for overhead and ground track fastening systems for DP World, PSA International, and APM Terminals.

Gantrex Group works in the steel and aluminum industry, with customers like Tata Steel and ArcelorMittal. Gantrex also specializes in lightweight industrial rail systems for the automated warehousing sector, having designed and implemented aluminum rail solutions for Pfizer, Coca-Cola, Ikea, BMW, and DHL.
