= Cavotec =

Switzerland-based engineering group

Cavotec SA
- Type: Publicly traded
- Traded as: (Nasdaq Stockholm: CCC)
- Founded: 1974 as Specimas AB and renamed as Cavotec in 1976
- Headquarters: Stockholm, Sweden
- Area served: Global
- Key people: Niklas Edling, Chairman; David Pagels, CEO
- Revenue: € 212,400,000
- Number of employees: 664 (2023)

Cavotec is a global engineering group, headquartered in Stockholm, Sweden, specializing in innovative and sustainable products for maritime and industrial applications. It is listed on the Nasdaq OMX in Stockholm, Sweden.

The company designs and manufactures automation and electrification technologies that help industries improve safety, efficiency, and environmental performance.

Cavotec has two business divisions, Ports & Maritime and Industry, and Services supporting the two.

Cavotec listed on the NASDAQ OMX Stockholm stock exchange on October 19, 2011. David Pagels was appointed Cavotec CEO in April 2022.

== Ports and maritime ==
Ports & Maritime is active in the ports, maritime, and oil and gas segments. It delivers systems for the electrification and automation of equipment such as harbour cranes and ships. Products include motorised cable reels, cable protection solutions, battery energy storage systems, connectors and power units, shore power systems, automated mooring systems, vessel charging systems, and radio remote controls.

== Industry ==
For industrial applications such as cranes, energy processing, transportation, mining and tunnelling, this division develops a variety of automation and electrification technologies including motorised cable reels, spring cable reels, radio remote controls, power connectors and units, slip rings, and megawatt charging system for battery powered heavy-duty vehicles and equipment.

== Services ==
The Services Division provides inspections, consulting, maintenance and spare parts programs to ports, airports and industrial customers.

== History ==
- 1974 - Specimas AB is incorporated in Sweden as a manufacturer of power supply equipment in the mining and tunnelling sectors.
- 1976 - Specimas AB is renamed as Cavotec AB.
- 1984 - Cavotec AB acquires Specimas SpA in Italy and Cavotec Finland opens as a second sales company.
- 1986 - Sales office opened in UK.
- 1988 - Sales offices opened in Italy, Norway and Canada.
- 1989 - Cavotec Group incorporated in the Netherlands.
- 1991 - Sales offices opened in Australia, France and Hong Kong.
- 1993 - Sales offices opened in Germany and UAE.
- 1995 - Sales offices opened in Shanghai and Argentina.
- 1997 - Acquisition of Cavotec Alfo in Germany and sales office opened in Singapore.
- 1999 - Acquisition of Metool in Australia and RMS in France.
- 2001 - Acquisition of a 20% interest in Micro-control as (Norway).
- 2002 - Acquisition of the Gantrex Group (USA, Canada and South Africa).
- 2004 - Cavotec partners with Mooring Systems Ltd, celebrates its 30th anniversary, acquires Fladung in Germany and remaining 80% of Micro-control as (Norway).
- 2005 - The first MoorMaster™ 400 is sold to the Port of Salalah (Oman) and Cavotec India is incorporated in Delhi.
- 2006 - Cavotec prepares and implements a restructuring of the Group, Port of Salalah (Oman) orders four MoorMaster™ 600 for its container port, and Cavotec and MSL shareholders approve a reverse merger.
- 2007 - A central Corporate Office in Lugano, Switzerland, is established and Cavotec becomes a listed company on the New Zealand Exchange.
- 2008 - Cavotec MSL acquires the Dabico Group in the USA and UK and the Meyerinck Group in Germany.
- 2009 - PCAir order received for Bahrain International Airport.
- 2011 - Cavotec listed on the NASDAQ OMX Stockholm stock exchange and received an order for 24 units of its automated mooring technology MoorMaster™ for use at Port Hedland in Western Australia. The company also opened sales offices in Spain and Brazil and completed the acquisition of US-based INET Group.
- 2012 Acquisition of Combibox in Sweden.
- 2013 Cavotec wins largest MoorMaster order to date in South Africa.
- 2014 Cavotec wins largest MoorMaster order to date in Canada.
- Cavotec ~~Inet~~ converters and PCA units installed at Dubai International Airport.
- 2015 Cavotec presents new senior management team. Cavotec wins airport systems orders worth EUR 27m.
- 2016 Cavotec announces a joint project with Wärtsilä to develop an induction charging and mooring technology for use with ferries. Cavotec selected to develop a ship-to-ship mooring solution on behalf of the US Navy.
- 2017 Cavotec wins EUR17.5m order for Dubai’s new Al Maktoum Airport. Mikael Norin appointed CEO.
- 2018 Cavotec opens new engineering and manufacturing facility in Italy.
- 2022 David Pagels was appointed Cavotec CEO in April
- 2025 Cavotec Group AB is successfully listed on Nasdaq Stockholm on 9 July 2025
