= Port Said Port Authority =

Port of Port Said

Location
- Country: Egypt

Details
- Operated by: Port Said Port Authority (PSPA)
- Owned by: Government of Egypt
- Type of Harbor: Natural deepwater seaport
- Land area: 279 hectares
- No. of berths: 24

The Port Said Port Authority (PSPA) is a government agency of Egypt, charged with the responsibility to govern, regulate and develop the port facilities in the vicinity of Port Said in the Mediterranean Sea, on the northern terminus of the Suez Canal.

== Overview ==
Principal port areas of Port Said include:

- Port Said West Port
- Port Said East Port
- El Arish Port

The original port at Port Said was built in 1859, expanding gradually by the decade. After the October 1973 War many ships began to call and the government of Egypt experienced a rise in contractual penalties it had to pay to shipping companies due to tardy service and congestion at the harbour. Consequently, its facilities began a period of great expansion. Today it is a competitive world port.

Port Said East Port is the location of the new, modern Suez Canal Container Terminal.

== See also ==
- Transport in Egypt
