= Port of Guangzhou =

Coordinates: 23.093865°N 113.437786°E

Port of Guangzhou 广州港
- Interactive map of Port of Guangzhou 广州港

Location
- Country: China
- Location: Guangzhou, Guangdong

Details
- Owned by: Guangzhou Port Group Co. Ltd

Port of Guangzhou
- Simplified Chinese: 广州港
- Traditional Chinese: 廣州港
Transcriptions
Standard Mandarin
- Hanyu Pinyin: Guǎngzhōu Gǎng
- Wade–Giles: Kuang-chou Góng
Yue: Cantonese
- Yale Romanization: Gwóngjāu Góng
- Jyutping: Gwong^{2} zau^{1} Gong^{2}
- IPA: Cantonese pronunciation: [kʷɔ̌ːŋtsɐ̂ukɔ̌ːŋ]

Port of Guangzhou is the main seaport of Guangzhou city, Guangdong province, China. The port is operated by Guangzhou Port Group Co. Ltd which is a state owned company. The company was established on February 26, 2004, from the former Guangzhou Harbor Bureau. It was approved by the Guangzhou Municipal Government. It is currently the largest comprehensive port in South China. Its international maritime trade reaches over 300 ports in more than 80 countries and districts worldwide. The port also incorporates the former Huangpu Port.

The port also serves as the important economic and transport center for the Pearl River Delta region and Guangdong province. It is also vital transport hub for industries located in neighboring provinces such as Guangxi, Yunnan, Guizhou, Sichuan, Hunan, Hubei and Jiangxi.

== History ==
Guangzhou was an important port during the ancient times as far back as the Qin dynasty. It served as a trading port as the "Silk Road on the Sea". The port became one of China's busiest ports during the Ming dynasty and Qing dynasty.

== Geography ==
Guangzhou Port is situated at the intersection of the three most important rivers of Dongjiang, Xijiang and Beijiang in South China. All the three rivers have the waterway, railway, expressway and air lines intersecting here, thus forming a critical transportation hub. It is the main port of focus in the Pearl River Delta Region.

The port's harbor area extends along the Pearl River coast and water areas in the cities of Guangzhou, Dongguan, Zhongshan, Shenzhen and Zhuhai. The port being situated beyond the entrance of Pearl River opening serve as a gateway for shipping activity for other Harbor area such as Nansha Harbor Area, Xinsha Harbor Area, Huangpu Harbor Area and Inner Harbor Area, and Nansha Harbor Area near Hong Kong.

== Port infrastructure ==
Guangzhou Port comprises 4600 berths, 133 buoys and 2359 anchorages each of 1,000 tonnage class and the largest capacity is 3,000 tons. The government has approved of the dredging of the port to allow 100 000 tonnes vessels to enter Nansha at high tide in July 2009. The port is currently dredging to allow 100 000 tonnes vessels to enter Nansha terminal in low tide.

== Port activities ==
The Port of Guangzhou plays a very important role in the economy. The port handles a range of activities which include loading and discharging, storage, bonded warehousing, container cargo services. Many agricultural, industrial and manufactured products are shipped through the port which include oil, coal, grain, chemical fertilizer, steel, ore and automobiles.

The port also provides passenger services as well as logistics services. It also played a major role in contributing to the success of the missionary hospital, the Canton Hospital.

== Shipping ==
As the biggest comprehensive hub port in South China, Port of Guangzhou is experiencing an increase in cargo volume and ships calling in. This is due to the buoyant economic activity in Guangzhou and the surrounding hinterland.

In 1999, Port of Guangzhou surpassed its annual cargo throughput of 100 million tons. It is the second port in mainland China to ranked with such record volume. As a result, the annual cargo volume continues to grow. In 2006, the whole Guangzhou Port surpassed 300 million tons (ranking the third in China's coastal ports and the fifth among the world top ten ports) and 665 million TEUs, and Guangzhou Port reached 201 million tons and 4.774 million TEUs.

The port is part of the Maritime Silk Road that runs from the Chinese coast to the southern tip of India, to Mombasa, from there through the Red Sea via the Suez Canal to the Mediterranean, to the Upper Adriatic region of the northern Italian hub Trieste with its rail connections to Central Europe and the North Sea.
