= Rijeka Gateway =

Croatian port operating company

Rijeka Gateway d.o.o.
- Type: Joint venture
- Industry: Transport
- Founded: 2021
- Headquarters: Rijeka, Croatia,
- Key people: Peter Slange Corfitsen (Chairman of the Board)
- Number of employees: cca. 410
- Parent: APM Terminals (51%); Enna Logic (49%)
- Website: https://www.apmterminals.com/en/rijeka

Rijeka Gateway is a port operating company which operates port facilities at the largest Croatian Port of Rijeka. Rijeka Gateway d.o.o. company was founded a joint venture between APM Terminals and Enna Logic and tasked with operating the Zagreb Deep Sea Container Terminal located on the Zagreb pier, in Rijeka basin.

== History ==
By the decision of the Government of the Republic of Croatia, the Zagreb Deep Sea container terminal was declared a strategic project of the Republic of Croatia and is the largest capital project of the Port of Rijeka Authority. The construction of the Phase 1 terminal was realized as part of a comprehensive and complex project financed by a World Bank loan officially named "Rijeka Gateway Project I and II" includes modernization of the port area and procurement of port equipment and construction of roads to the Port of Rijeka. On May 23, 2019, the works on the construction of the first phase of the Zagreb Deep Sea container terminal were completed. The completion of works on the new container terminal at the Zagreb pier is also the completion of a comprehensive project for the reconstruction of the Rijeka traffic route, called the Rijeka Gateway project.

In early 2018. The Port of Rijeka Authority, as an implementing institution at the Ministry of the Sea, Transport and Infrastructure of the Republic of Croatia, has initiated preparatory actions for the selection of concessionaires in Zagreb Deep Sea container terminal.

On March 4, 2019, the international public tender procedure began by inviting interested qualified port terminal operators to submit a Request for participation in the procedure and competitive dialogue, thus expressing interest in obtaining a concession for a container terminal in the Port of Rijeka. The invitation was published on the Electronic Public Procurement Notice of the Republic of Croatia, and lasted until 3 May 2019.

The first round of the competition ended on June 30, 2019, after the evaluation of the received Requests for participation in the competitive dialogue and the compilation of a short list of candidates. The second round of the competition started on July 1, 2019, when the Data Room was opened for the shortlisted candidates and the Bidding Documents - Part Two were submitted. The competitive dialogue with the candidates was conducted in the period July - November 2019.

On 2 December 2019, the Port of Rijeka Authority sent a Shortlist of Candidates from the short list and a Call for Final Bids, and on 9 March 2020, the Port of Rijeka officially opened the bids. Bids were submitted by:

- community of competitors Ningbo Zhousan Port Company LTD, Tianjin Port Overseas Holding LTD and China Road and Bridge Corporation
- community of competitors APM Terminals BV, Enna Logic d.o.o.

On 30 December 2020, the management board of the Port of Rijeka Authority annulled the procedure for granting a concession at the Zagreb Deep Sea container terminal, just a day before the deadline for selecting the best offer. The Port Authority announced the annulment of the public tender with a brief announcement of a new tender. The tender was allegedly annulled due to pressure from the EU, which co-finances many projects on the Rijeka transport route.

On March 22, 2021, the Port of Rijeka Authority announced a new tender for a concession for the Zagreb Deep Sea with a container terminal estimated at HRK 20.5 billion. The competition was slightly modified from the last, but without restrictions for Chinese companies.

On May 10, 2021, a consortium consisting of APM Terminals, a subsidiary of the largest container shipping company Maersk and Enna Logic, a Croatian logistics company operating within the PPD Group, applied for a repeated tender for the Zagreb pier. APM Terminals and Enna Logic offered a turnover of one million TEUs in the first two years of operation of the terminal and a turnover of at least 500 thousand TEUs, in each of the next at least eight years of operation. On June 25, 2021, the Managing Board of the Port of Rijeka Authority has made a decision on the award of the concession to APM Terminals BV and Enna Logic d.o.o.

The new tender also included a concession for a period of 50 years, with the obligation of the concessionaire to build the second phase of the terminal within ten years at the latest. In addition to the construction of an additional 280 meters of shoreline, the concessionaire has the obligation to fully equip the terminal, from infrastructure such as water supply, drainage, electricity and telecommunications, through buildings and operating areas, to coastal container bridges and cranes and all other equipment needed for the terminal. That the terminal should be operational within about two and a half years from the signing of the concession agreement. This deadline coincides with the deadline for the completion of works on the access road D403, which is, by the way, an integral part of the project of the new container terminal and without which the Zagreb coast cannot obtain a use permit.

On November 5, 2021, a concession agreement was signed for the Zagreb Deep Sea container terminal between Denis Vukorepa, director of the Port Authority of Rijeka, and representatives of the concessionaire, Morten Engelstoft, CEO of APM Terminals and Pavao Vujnovac, president of Energija Naturalis Group. The signing was attended by Prime Minister Andrej Plenković, Oleg Butković, Minister of the Sea, Transport and Infrastructure, the Mayor of Rijeka Marko Filipović, the Deputy Prefect of Primorje-Gorski Kotar County Vojko Braut, Danish Ambassador to Croatia Ole Henrik Frijs-Madsen and representatives of numerous companies and institutions.

Rijeka Gateway started operations on September 10, 2025, with the mooring of the first commercial ship, Al Jasrah owned by Hapag-Lloyd, a shipping company member of the Gemini Cooperation together with Maersk Line.

== Technical characteristics ==
The new facility will develop in two phases, with phase 1 operational since September 2025 and second to be built within ten years from the start of operation (Figures in brackets show phase 2):

- Annual capacity: 600,000 TEU (1,055,000 TEU)
- Max vessel size: 24,000 TEU
- Berth length: 400 m (680 m)
- Ship-to-Shore Cranes: 4 (largest currently available)
- Terminal Tractor (TT): 28
- Rubber Tyre Gantry (RTG): 15
- Rail Mounted Gantry (RMG) 2
- Reach stackers: 2
- Empty handlers: 2

== Concession requirements ==
APM Terminals and Enna Logic have committed to pay a fixed concession fee of €2 million per year and a variable depending on revenue:

- 6% of the terminal's gross revenue, if the revenue is up to 20 million euros
- 5% of the terminal's gross revenue, if the revenue is between 20 and 40 million euros
- 4% of the terminal's gross revenue, if the revenue is more than 40 million euros

The concessionaires also offered a turnover of one million TEUs in the first two years of operation of the terminal and a turnover of at least 500 thousand TEUs, in each of the next at least eight years of operation.
