= Kyle Krisiloff =

American racing driver (born 1986)

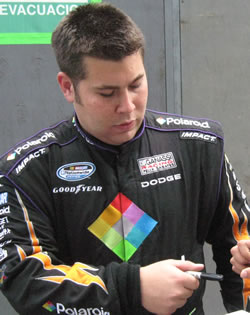
- Krisiloff in 2008
- Born: March 3, 1986 (age 40); Trenton, New Jersey, U.S.
- Achievements: 2001 SCCA Formula Ford National Champion; 14-time Quarter Midget Grand National Champion (Jr. Stock, Lt. Modified, Sr. Honda, Lt. B, Heavy B, Heavy AA)

NASCAR O'Reilly Auto Parts Series career
- 44 races run over 3 years
- Best finish: 18th (2007)
- First race: 2005 SBC 250 (Milwaukee)
- Last race: 2008 Aaron's 312 (Talladega)
Wins	Top tens	Poles
0	2	0

NASCAR FedEx Freight Truck Series career
- 12 races run over 1 year
- Best finish: 33rd (2006)
- First race: 2006 GM Flex Fuel 250 (Daytona)
- Last race: 2006 O'Reilly Auto Parts 250 (Kansas)
Wins	Top tens	Poles
0	0	0
- Statistics up to date as of August 5, 2014.

Kyle Krisiloff (born March 3, 1986) is an American former professional racing driver. He is the son of former Champ Car racer, Steve Krisiloff, the nephew of Tony George, and the grandson of Mari Hulman George. He became the youngest BMX rider in the United States, when he began racing BMX bicycles at just three years old. He raced quarter midgets from 1995 to 1999, winning over 320 features and nine Grand National Championships.

== Racing career ==
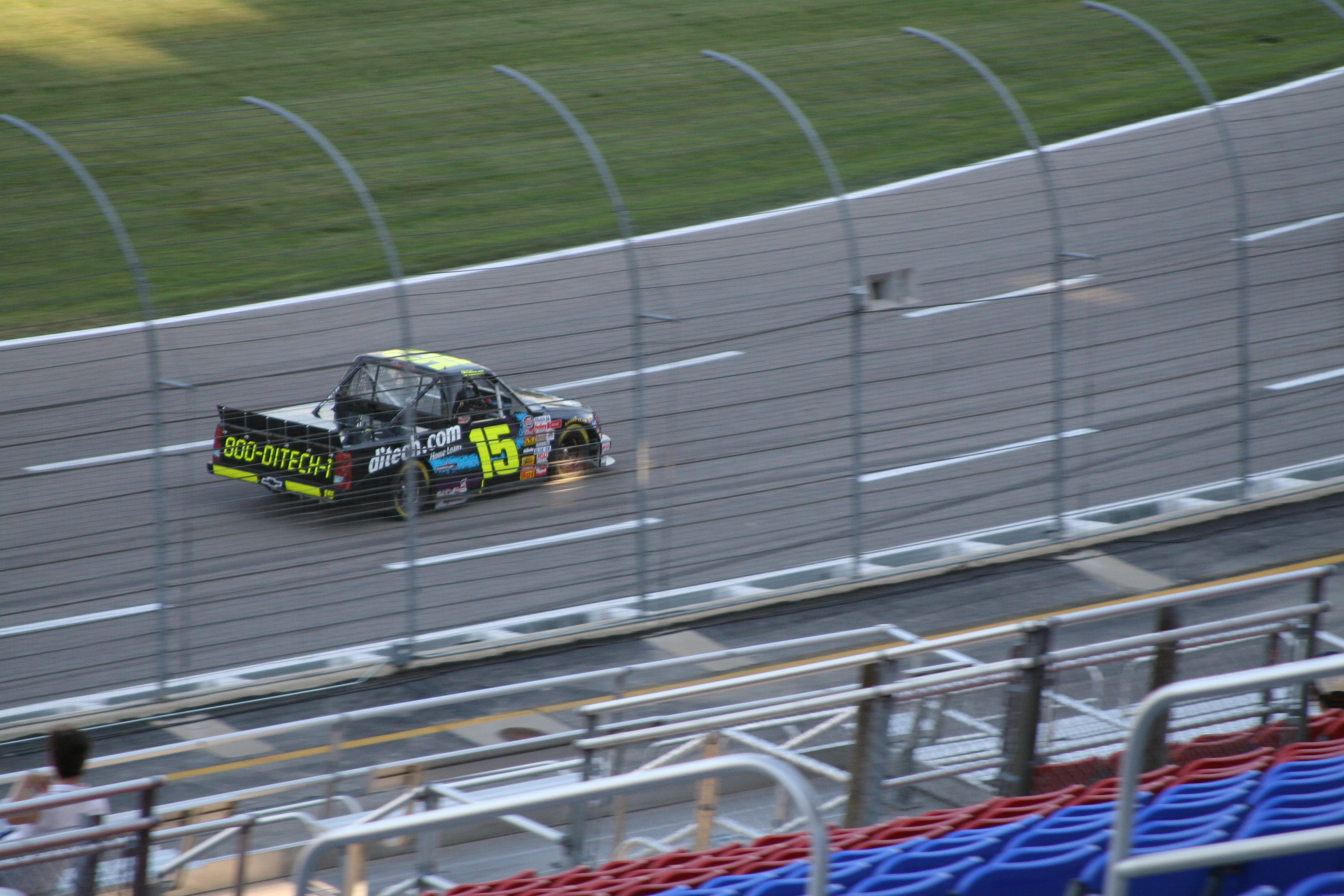
Krisiloff's 2006 truck at Texas

Born in Trenton, New Jersey, Krisiloff made his home in Carmel, Indiana. In 2000, Krisiloff raced in Superkarts USA competition, winning two races and two pole positions. In 2001, he competed in twenty-two SCCA Formula Ford events, winning six races, six poles, and national championship at the historic SCCA Runoffs (The youngest ever at 14 years of age). In 2002, he competed in Toyota Atlantic for the last six races of the year. He ran the full season in 2003, placing tenth in points. His best finish was a second at the Milwaukee Mile, which made him the youngest driver to score a podium finish in Toyota Atlantics as well as the fastest Toyota Atlantic driver ever setting a speed over 150 mph (240 km/h) at the Milwaukee Mile.

In 2004, Krisiloff signed a driver development contract with Hendrick Motorsports and ran three ARCA Re/Max Series races with Bobby Gerhart Racing and ten ASA races as part of the agreement. He started third and finished ninth in his ARCA series debut at Lake Erie Speedway, and then finished second at Nashville Superspeedway, before winning at Chicagoland Speedway in only his third series start. In ten ASA starts, he recorded a single top-ten finish with a fourth at Lowe's Motor Speedway. He ran fourteen ARCA races in 2005, recording three top fives, five top tens, and two poles. He also competed in three NASCAR Busch Series races in the No. 5 Hendrick Motorsports Chevrolet. After leaving Hendrick Motorsports in 2005, Krisiloff moved to the Craftsman Truck Series in 2006, driving for Billy Ballew Motorsports, before parting ways due to financial conflicts.

In January 2007, a partnership including Carl Haas, Travis Carter, Mari Hulman George, and Michael T. Lanigan announced that it was purchasing ppc Racing and would field the No. 14 Ford Fusion in the Busch Series with Krisiloff as the driver. The car was to be sponsored by Clabber Girl, which is part of the Hulman-George family holdings, but later gained sponsorship from Walgreens and Eli Lilly and Company. His best finishes were fifth at Talladega and 6th at Montreal. In 2008, he drove six races for Chip Ganassi Racing in the No. 41 Polaroid Dodge, earning a best finish of 24th at Phoenix.

== Motorsports career results ==
=== SCCA National Championship Runoffs ===
Year	Track	Car	Engine	Class	Finish	Start	Status
2001	Mid-Ohio	Van Diemen RF01	Ford	Formula Ford	1	5	Running

=== NASCAR ===
(key) (Bold – Pole position awarded by qualifying time. Italics – Pole position earned by points standings or practice time. * – Most laps led.)

==== Nationwide Series ====
NASCAR Nationwide Series results
Year	Team	No.	Make	1	2	3	4	5	6	7	8	9	10	11	12	13	14	15	16	17	18	19	20	21	22	23	24	25	26	27	28	29	30	31	32	33	34	35	NNSC	Pts	Ref
2005	Hendrick Motorsports	5	Chevy	DAY	CAL	MXC	LVS	ATL	NSH	BRI	TEX	PHO	TAL	DAR	RCH	CLT	DOV	NSH	KEN	MLW; 42	DAY	CHI	NHA	PPR	GTY	IRP	GLN	MCH; 40	BRI	CAL	RCH	DOV	KAN	CLT	MEM; 19	TEX	PHO	HOM	95th	186	
2007	Carl A. Haas Motorsports	14	Ford	DAY; 27	CAL; 33	MXC; 16	LVS; 27	ATL; 38	BRI; 39	NSH; 21	TEX; 27	PHO; 23	TAL; 5	RCH; 34	DAR; 28	CLT; 38	DOV; 21	NSH; 27	KEN; 29	MLW; 24	NHA; 32	DAY; 20	CHI; 28	GTY; 36	IRP; 21	CGV; 6	GLN; 37	MCH; 34	BRI; 36	CAL; 41	RCH; 29	DOV; 34	KAN; 28	CLT; 21	MEM; 42	TEX; 27	PHO; 25	HOM; 29	18th	2798	
2008	Chip Ganassi Racing	41	Dodge	DAY	CAL	LVS; 43	ATL	BRI	NSH; 25	TEX; 33	PHO; 24	MXC; 29	TAL; 33	RCH	DAR	CLT	DOV	NSH	KEN	MLW	NHA	DAY	CHI	GTY	IRP	CGV	GLN	MCH	BRI	CAL	RCH	DOV	KAN	CLT	MEM	TEX	PHO	HOM	67th	417	

==== Craftsman Truck Series ====
NASCAR Craftsman Truck Series results
Year	Team	No.	Make	1	2	3	4	5	6	7	8	9	10	11	12	13	14	15	16	17	18	19	20	21	22	23	24	25	NCTC	Pts	Ref
2006	Billy Ballew Motorsports	15	Chevy	DAY; 28	CAL; 19	ATL; 16	MAR; 23	GTY; 33	CLT; 17	MFD; 25	DOV; 27	TEX; 19	MCH; 32	MLW; 29	KAN; 17	KEN	MEM	IRP	NSH	BRI	NHA	LVS	TAL	MAR	ATL	TEX	PHO	HOM	33rd	1106	

=== ARCA Re/Max Series ===
(key) (Bold – Pole position awarded by qualifying time. Italics – Pole position earned by points standings or practice time. * – Most laps led.)

ARCA Re/Max Series results
Year	Team	No.	Make	1	2	3	4	5	6	7	8	9	10	11	12	13	14	15	16	17	18	19	20	21	22	23	ARMC	Pts	Ref
2004	Hendrick Motorsports	6	Chevy	DAY	NSH	SLM	KEN	TOL	CLT	KAN	POC	MCH	SBO	BLN	KEN	GTW	POC	LER; 9									45th	660	
2004	Hendrick Motorsports	5	Chevy																NSH; 2	ISF	TOL	DSF	CHI; 1	SLM	TAL		45th	660	
2005	Gerhart Racing	7	Chevy	DAY; 13																							24th	1960	
2005	Hendrick Motorsports	7	Chevy		NSH; 13	SLM	KEN; 36	TOL	LAN	MIL; 16	POC; 7	**MCH**; 5	KAN; 2	KEN; 6	BLN	POC; 32	GTW; 33	LER	NSH; 34	**MCH**; 37	ISF	TOL	DSF	CHI; 23	SLM	TAL; 2	24th	1960	
2008	Gerhart Racing	7	Chevy	DAY; 38	SLM	IOW	KAN	CAR	KEN	TOL	POC	MCH	CAY	KEN	BLN	POC	NSH	ISF	DSF	CHI	SLM	NJE	TAL	TOL			153rd	40	
