= Itapoá =

- Municipality
- Itapoá Municipality
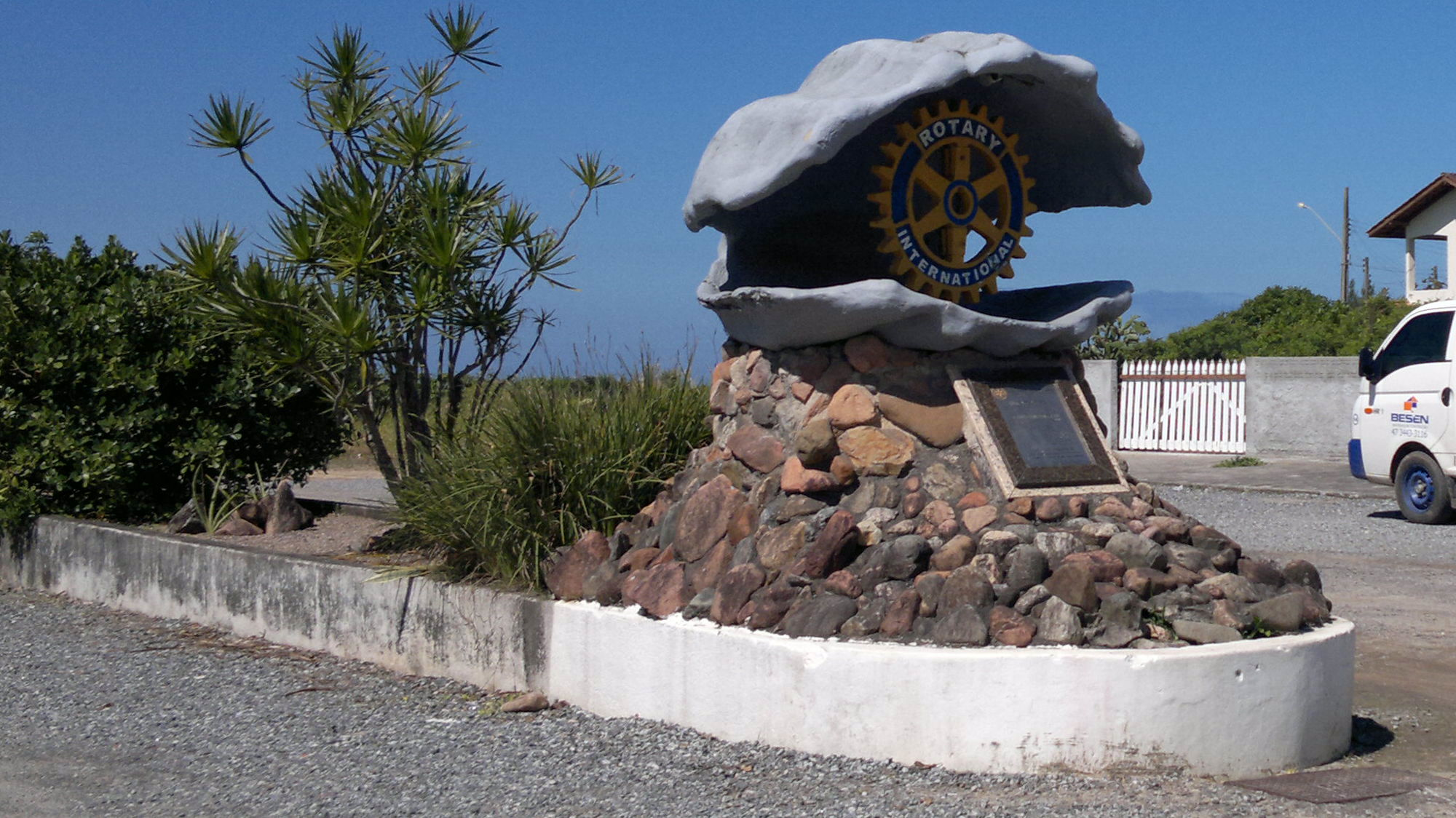
- Itapoá SC - Rotary - panoramio.jpg

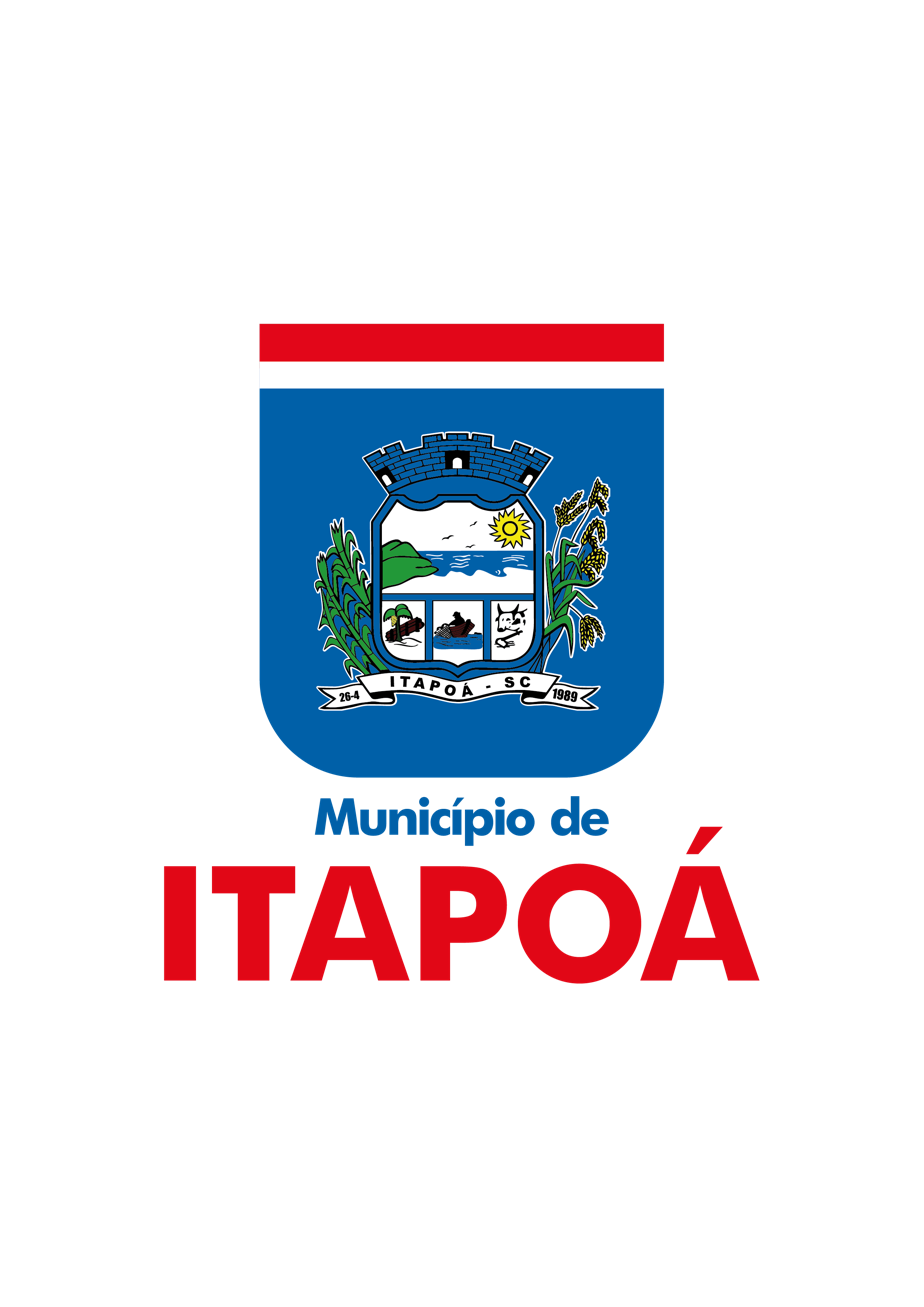
- Flag Coat of arms

- Location of Itapoá
- Coordinates: 26°07′01″S 48°36′57″W
- Country: Brazil
- Region: South
- State: Santa Catarina
- Founded: April 26, 1989

Government
  - Mayor: Jeferson Rubens Garcia

Area
  - Total: 257.158 km^{2} (99.289 sq mi)
- Elevation: 18 m (59 ft)

Population (2020)
  - Total: 21,177
  - Density: 48.3/km^{2} (125/sq mi)
- Time zone: UTC−3 (BRT)
- HDI (2000): 0.793 – medium

Itapoá is a municipality in the northern part of the state of Santa Catarina, Brazil. It borders the municipal areas of São Francisco do Sul in the south and of Garuva in the west. In the north it borders with the state of Paraná. It is the northernmost municipality in Santa Catarina.

Itapoá was originally part of the municipality of Garuva, but gained independency in 1989.

Its main revenue originates from tourism, due to its situation at the Atlantic coast. The nature reserve "Volta Velha" in the premises of the municipality is one of the last large-scale remnant of Restinga vegetation in the state.
