= Travis Carter Enterprises =

Former NASCAR team

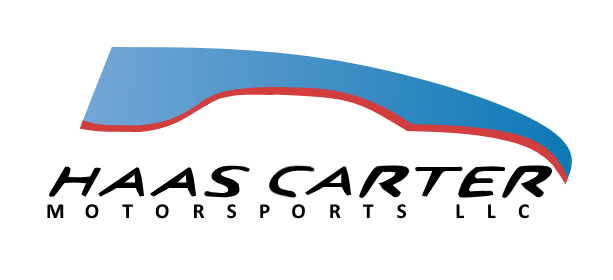
- Owner(s): Travis Carter, Carl Haas; Sam Belnavis (2003 only); Mari Hulman George, Mike Lanigan (2007 only)
- Base: Statesville, North Carolina
- Series: Winston Cup, Busch Series
- Race drivers: Darrell Waltrip, Geoff Bodine, Jimmy Spencer, Todd Bodine, Joe Nemechek
- Manufacturer: Chevrolet, Ford
- Opened: 1990
- Closed: 2007

Career
- Drivers' Championships: 0
- Race victories: 0

Travis Carter Enterprises (later known as Haas-Carter Motorsports, K Mart Racing, BelCar Motorsports and Richardson-Haas Motorsports) was a NASCAR and USAR Pro Cup team. It was mostly owned by former crew chief Travis Carter and Carl Haas. The team previously fielded entries in the Winston Cup Series before closing. It returned in 2007 to field a full-time entry for rookie Kyle Krisiloff.

== Winston Cup ==
=== Beginnings ===
After purchasing Mach 1 Racing from Hal Needham following the 1989 season, Travis Carter Enterprises debuted at the 1990 Daytona 500, as the No. 98 Chevrolet sponsored by Winn-Dixie. Butch Miller was the driver, who finished 22nd. Miller drove the car in 23 races that year, posting one top-ten finish before he was replaced by Rick Mast, who finished out the year and garnered an additional top ten. In 1991, Jimmy Spencer took over as Banquet Foods was the sponsor, and finished 25th in points. Spencer ran just seven races with the car in 1992, before the team suspended operations temporarily.

=== Multi-car ===
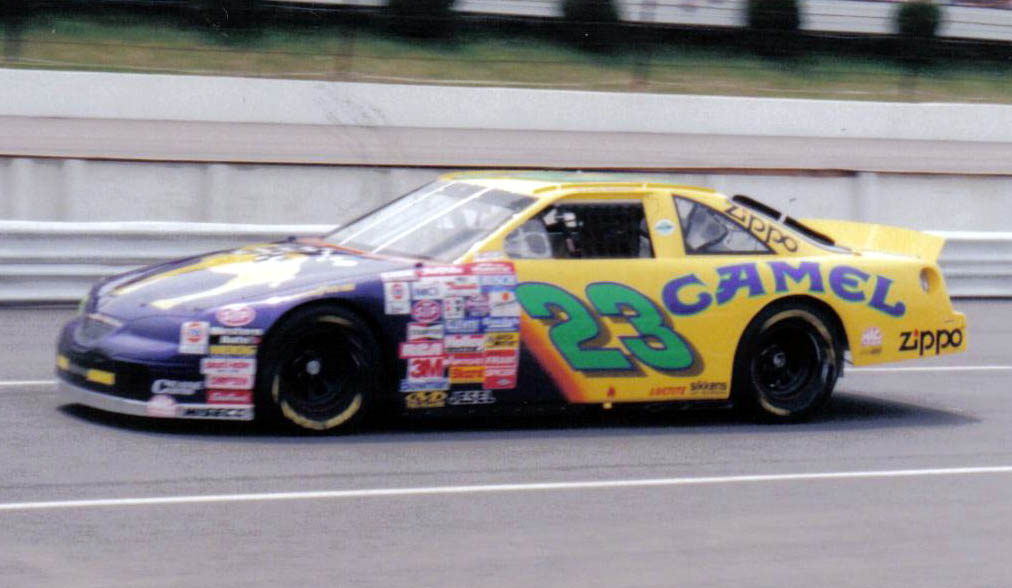
Spencer's 1997 Camel Ford

Travis Carter Enterprises returned in 1994 as the No. 23 Camel Cigarettes-sponsored Ford Thunderbird driven by Hut Stricklin. After posting one top ten finish that year, Stricklin was removed as Spencer returned to the team again. Spencer ran in the car for several years, the big change coming when Winston became the sponsor in 1998. That year, Spencer looked poised for a top-ten finish in points, but injuries kept him from doing that as he was replaced by Ted Musgrave and Frank Kimmel while he nursed his wounds.

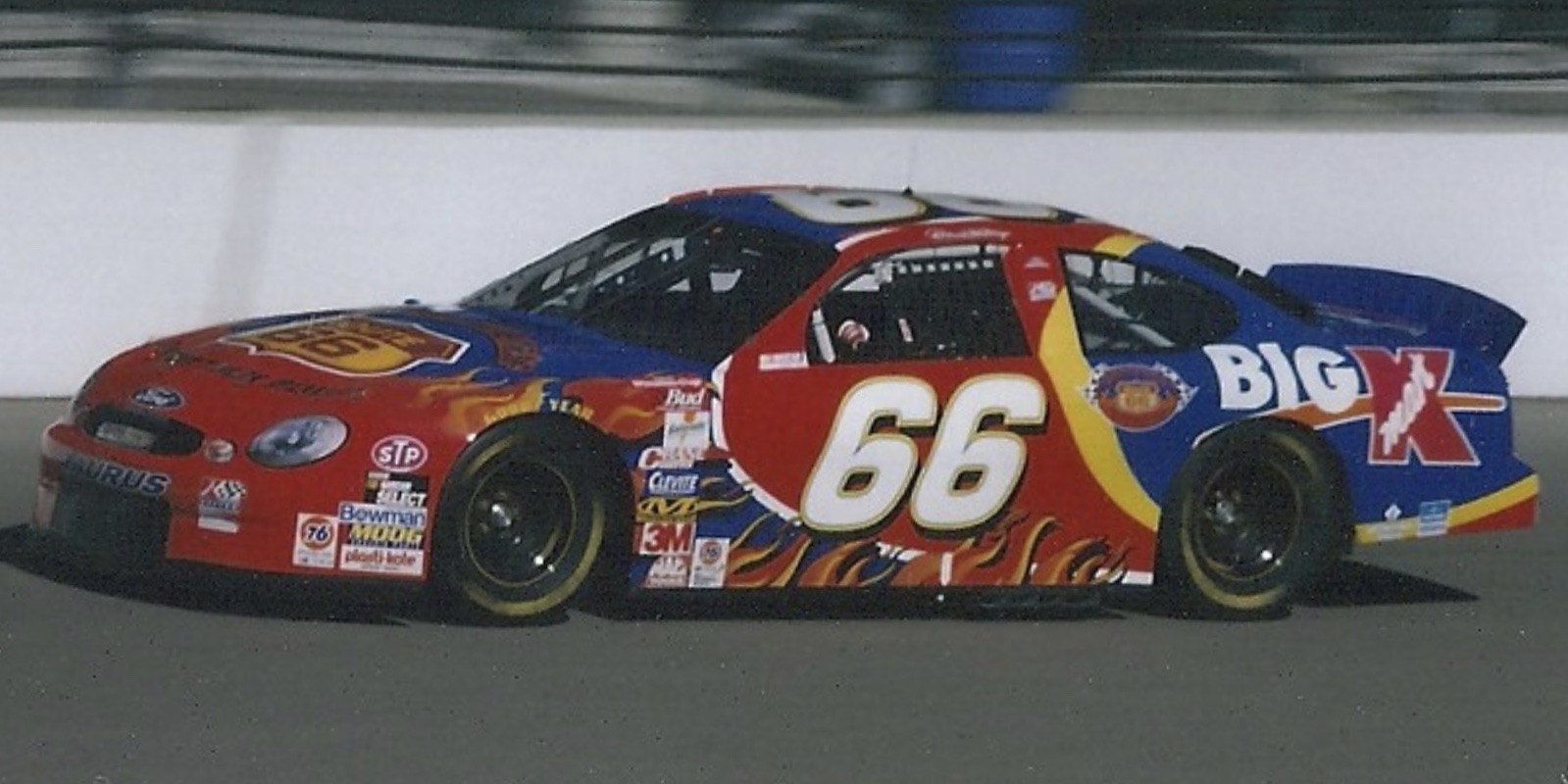
Waltrip's No. 66 Ford Taurus at the 1999 Brickyard 400

At the end of the year, Carter announced he would expand his team to a multi-car operation, with three-time champion Darrell Waltrip driving the No. 66 Kmart Ford and Haas coming on board as a partner. The new team had previously been the No. 27 owned by David Blair Motorsports. Waltrip amassed the largest number of DNQ's he had ever had during his career. In 2000, he retired from the Winston Cup, his lone highlight being an outside-pole qualifying effort at the Brickyard 400. Kmart also sponsored Spencer's car beginning in 2000, after the team's previous sponsorship agreement with R. J. Reynolds expired, with the team switching to No. 26 after acquiring the number from Roush Racing. Waltrip's replacement was Todd Bodine (who drove a third car in Waltrip’s final race, the No. 46) who won three pole positions and finished 29th in points. After 2001, Spencer departed, and Joe Nemechek signed on to replace him. Unfortunately, during the offseason, Kmart went into bankruptcy, and the team's status was in danger. Nemechek ran a mere handful races that year before his team was folded, and after subbing in several races afterward he signed with Hendrick Motorsports to drive the No. 25 car. Bodine attempted the first few races in the No. 66 and qualified on the pole for the Las Vegas race, but he eventually was parked for several weeks while the team looked for a sponsorship. Frank Kimmel returned for six races in the No. 26 with his National Pork Board sponsorship from the ARCA series. Bodine eventually returned to race the No. 26 after Haas-Carter found full-time sponsorship from Discover Card and split time in the ride with his older brother Geoff Bodine. The 66 car returned part-time later in the year, with Japanese racer Hideo Fukuyama running a handful of races.

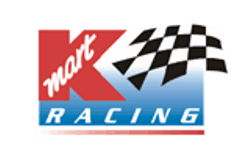
The Alternative K-Mart Racing Branding during the 2 car team years.

=== BelCar Motorsports ===
In 2003, HCM merged with minority owner Sam Belnavis to form BelCar Motorsports. The No. 26 team switched to No. 54 with the U.S. National Guard as the sponsor. Bodine struggled, posting one-top ten finish and finishing 31st in points. Fukuyama, meanwhile, made an attempt at Rookie of the year honors in the No. 66, but that was soon aborted due to a lack of funding. At the end of the season, the Army/National Guard and Belnavis left for Roush Racing. Still, the team looked like it might come back. Carter teamed up with a British-based motorsports group called TorqueSpeed. The team was to be known as TorqueSpeed Carter and run a limited Cup schedule in 2004 with John Mickel as the driver. However, this new alliance never saw the track.

== Rebirth ==
In 2004, Carter left NASCAR's top division to focus on mentoring his son Matt Carter who was working his way up the stock car ranks in the USAR Hooters Pro Cup Series. For two years, Carter drove for other teams while under his father's guidance.

In 2007, Travis Carter announced his return to NASCAR with the help of Newman/Haas Racing co-owner Carl Haas, Indianapolis Motor Speedway chairman Mari Hulman George, and Mi-Jack Products founder Michael Lanigan. The team ran in the Busch Series under the Carl A. Haas Motorsports banner. Their driver was Kyle Krisiloff, and they carried the No. 14 with ppc Racing's No. 22's owner points from 2006. Sponsorship was originally limited to Clabber Girl, owned by Hulman & Company. Later in the season Walgreens and Eli Lilly and Company signed on to sponsor the car. At one point in the 2007 campaign, the team was to be merged with Yates/Newman/Haas/Lanigan Racing as a part of a deal between team owner Carl Haas and Nextel Cup owner Robert Yates. The team was to be the second Busch team for YNHL until Robert Yates announced his retirement following the 2007 season and ended the partnership with Newman/Haas/Lanigan Racing. Krisiloff was released at the end of the season, and the team lost its sponsors as well. The team began the 2008 season under the banner of Richardson-Haas Motorsports, and the team ran at Daytona in 2008 with David Gilliland sponsored by Music City Illinois but crashed out. The team was to run at Auto Club Speedway with Eric Norris but withdrew.

== Results ==
=== Primary Car Results ===
Year	Driver	No.	Make	1	2	3	4	5	6	7	8	9	10	11	12	13	14	15	16	17	18	19	20	21	22	23	24	25	26	27	28	29	30	31	32	33	34	35	36	Owners	Pts
1990	Butch Miller	98	Chevy	DAY; 22	RCH; 28	CAR; 13	ATL; 20	DAR; 17	BRI; 14	NWS; 25	MAR; 18	TAL; 16	CLT; 18	DOV; 14	SON; 31	POC; 23	MCH; 23	DAY; 23	POC; 8	TAL; 34	GLN; 25	MCH; 12	BRI; 16	DAR; 29	RCH; 19	DOV; 17														24th	2894
1990	Rick Mast	98	Chevy																								MAR; 31	NWS; 32	CLT; 34	CAR; 22	PHO; 7	ATL; 29								24th	2894
1991	Jimmy Spencer	98	Chevy	DAY; 40	RCH; 34	CAR; 38	ATL; 16	DAR; 11	BRI; 8	NWS; 3	MAR; 6	TAL; 9	CLT; 31	DOV; 28	SON; 29	POC; 14	MCH; 32	DAY; 10	POC; 37	TAL; 37	GLN; 27	MCH; 36	BRI; 15*	DAR; 31	RCH; 15	DOV; 18	MAR; 28	NWS; 23	CLT; 23	CAR; 22	PHO; 7	ATL; 38								25th	2790
1992	Jimmy Spencer	98	Chevy	DAY; DNQ	CAR; 20	RCH; 12	ATL; 37	DAR; 36	BRI; DNQ	NWS; 26	MAR; DNQ	TAL; 32	CLT; 27	DOV	SON	POC	MCH; DNQ	DAY	POC	TAL	GLN	MCH	BRI	DAR	RCH	DOV	MAR	NWS	CLT	CAR	PHO	ATL								42nd	571
1994	Hut Stricklin	23	Ford	DAY; 33	CAR; 26	RCH; DNQ	ATL; 17	DAR; 17	BRI; 14	NWS; 20	MAR; 20	TAL; 18	SON; 20	CLT; 12	DOV; 9	POC; 13	MCH; 22	DAY; 42	NHA; 36	POC; 22	TAL; 25	IND; 36	GLN; 30	MCH; DNQ	BRI; 35	DAR; 14	RCH; 30	DOV; 32	MAR; 23	NWS; 22	CLT; 21	CAR; 27	PHO; 24	ATL; 16						26th	2711
1995	Jimmy Spencer	23	Ford	DAY; DNQ	CAR; 30	RCH; 24	ATL; 32	DAR; 36	BRI; 16	NWS; 27	MAR; DNQ	TAL; 9	SON; 17	CLT; 27	DOV; 29	POC; 41	MCH; 30	DAY; 9	NHA; 12	POC; 17	TAL; 10	IND; 23	GLN; 18	MCH; 14	BRI; 18	DAR; 29	RCH; 31	DOV; 16	MAR; 18	NWS; 36	CLT; 12	CAR; 26	PHO; 33	ATL; 6						26th	2809
1996	Jimmy Spencer	23	Ford	DAY; 11	CAR; 27	RCH; 29	ATL; 7	DAR; 32	BRI; 13	NWS; 31	MAR; 19	TAL; 40	SON; 21	CLT; 17	DOV; 6	POC; 8	MCH; 4	DAY; 10	NHA; 17	POC; 24	TAL; 5	IND; 12	GLN; 19	MCH; 10	BRI; 7	DAR; 23	RCH; 30	DOV; 30	MAR; 19	NWS; 20	CLT; 16	CAR; 10	PHO; 18	ATL; 14						15th	3476
1997	Jimmy Spencer	23	Ford	DAY; 35	CAR; 40	RCH; 22	ATL; 32	DAR; 22	TEX; 39	BRI; 15	MAR; 11	SON; 14	TAL; 7	CLT; 18	DOV; 22	POC; 19	MCH; 15	CAL; 5	DAY; 31	NHA; 12	POC; 7	IND; 24	GLN; 34	MCH; 19	BRI; 27	DAR; 28	RCH; 11	NHA; 7	DOV; 36	MAR; 33	CLT; 42	TAL; 24	CAR; 43	PHO; 14	ATL; 24					20th	3079
1998	Jimmy Spencer	23	Ford	DAY; 15	CAR; 4	LVS; 7	ATL; 41	DAR; 21	BRI; 14	TEX; 7	MAR; 30	TAL; 2	CAL; 21	CLT; 13	DOV; 24	RCH; 14	MCH; 11	POC; 10	SON; 29	NHA; 25	POC; 19	IND; 32	GLN; 20			NHA; 13	DAR; 34	RCH; 9	DOV; 27	MAR; 19	CLT; 10	TAL; 4	DAY; 12	PHO; 26	CAR; 30	ATL; 21				14th	3464
1998	Frank Kimmel	23	Ford																					MCH; 31																14th	3464
1998	Ted Musgrave	23	Ford																						BRI; 20															14th	3464
1999	Jimmy Spencer	23	Ford	DAY; 41	CAR; 25	LVS; 26	ATL; 17	DAR; 20	TEX; 28	BRI; 17	MAR; 16	TAL; 16	CAL; 36	RCH; 29	CLT; 38	DOV; 23	MCH; 43	POC; 14	SON; 5	DAY; 27	NHA; 9	POC; 20	IND; 26	GLN; 16	MCH; 8	BRI; 2	DAR; 15	RCH; 37	NHA; 24	DOV; 14	MAR; 17	CLT; 28	TAL; 24	CAR; 20	PHO; 17	HOM; 20	ATL; 42			20th	3307
2000	Jimmy Spencer	26	Ford	DAY; 30	CAR; 26	LVS; 30	ATL; 17	DAR; 23	BRI; 18	TEX; 15	MAR; 28	TAL; 5	CAL; 40	RCH; 17	CLT; 25	DOV; 22	MCH; 15	POC; 36	SON; 34	DAY; 32	NHA; 41	POC; 9	IND; 17	GLN; 31	MCH; 7	BRI; 24	DAR; 32	RCH; 33	NHA; 15	DOV; 34	MAR; 7	CLT; 15	TAL; 38	CAR; 39	PHO; 13	HOM; 5	ATL; 33			22nd	3188
2001	Jimmy Spencer	26	Ford	DAY; 27	CAR; 30	LVS; 10	ATL; 25	DAR; 4	BRI; 19	TEX; 38	MAR; 9	TAL; 36	CAL; 7	RCH; 16	CLT; 6	DOV; 37	MCH; 11	POC; 17	SON; 27	DAY; 19	CHI; 5	NHA; 4	POC; 12	IND; 13	GLN; 38	MCH; 11	BRI; 35	DAR; 31	RCH; 8	DOV; 13	KAN; 22	CLT; 11	MAR; 14	TAL; 43	PHO; 31	CAR; 26	HOM; 18	ATL; 40	NHA; 14	16th	3782
2002	Joe Nemechek	26	Ford	DAY; 40	CAR; 33	LVS; 19	ATL; 25	DAR; 17	BRI; 43				CAL; 25																											36th	2830
2002	Frank Kimmel	26	Ford							TEX; 33	MAR; 40	TAL; 35		RCH; 42	CLT; 26																									36th	2830
2002	Todd Bodine	26	Ford													DOV; 18	POC; 18		SON; 26	DAY; 7	CHI; 26	NHA; 6		IND; 34	GLN; 8	MCH; 26	BRI; 43	DAR; 33	RCH; 5	NHA; 42	DOV; 40	KAN; 34	TAL; 23	CLT; 37	MAR; 30	ATL; 41	CAR; 42	PHO; 22		36th	2830
2002	Geoff Bodine	26	Ford															MCH; 19					POC; 34																HOM; 32	36th	2830
2003	Todd Bodine	54	Ford	DAY; 18	CAR; 42	LVS; 20	ATL; 28	DAR; 43	BRI; 40	TEX; 11	TAL; 28	MAR; 37	CAL; 25	RCH; 23	CLT; 23	DOV; 12	POC; 11	MCH; 37	SON; 23	DAY; 13	CHI; 33	NHA; 19	POC; 8	IND; 23	GLN; 35	MCH; 43	BRI; 37	DAR; 17	RCH; 42	NHA; 35	DOV; 17	TAL; DNQ	KAN; 11	CLT; 29	MAR; 40	ATL; 42	PHO; 22	CAR; 16	HOM; 11	31st	2976

=== Secondary Car Results ===
Year	Driver	No.	Make	1	2	3	4	5	6	7	8	9	10	11	12	13	14	15	16	17	18	19	20	21	22	23	24	25	26	27	28	29	30	31	32	33	34	35	36	Owners	Pts
1999	Darrell Waltrip	66	Ford	DAY; 21	CAR; 27	LVS; 25	ATL; 20	DAR; 41	TEX; 25	BRI; 32	MAR; 12	TAL; 26	CAL; 15	RCH; 25	CLT; 43	DOV; DNQ	MCH; 39	POC; 34	SON; 12	DAY; 38	NHA; 33	POC; 25	IND; 42	GLN; 15	MCH; DNQ	BRI; 14	DAR; 29	RCH; 32	NHA; DNQ	DOV; DNQ	MAR; 23	CLT; DNQ	TAL; DNQ	CAR; 34	PHO; 26	HOM; 43	ATL; DNQ			37th	2158
2000	Darrell Waltrip	66	Ford	DAY; 32	CAR; 39	LVS; 38	ATL; 31	DAR; 43	BRI; 31	TEX; 24	MAR; 43	TAL; 26	CAL; 29	RCH; DNQ	CLT; DNQ	DOV; 33	MCH; DNQ	POC; DNQ	SON; 28	DAY; 27	NHA; 33	POC; 22	IND; 11	GLN; 20	MCH; DNQ	BRI; 42	DAR; 42	RCH; DNQ	NHA; 29	DOV; 31	MAR; 27	CLT; 30	TAL; 35	CAR; 37	PHO; 33	HOM; 36	ATL; 34			36th	1981
2001	Todd Bodine	66	Ford	DAY; DNQ	CAR; 34	LVS; 5	ATL; 18	DAR; 33	BRI; 32	TEX; 35	MAR; 43	TAL; 41	CAL; 28	RCH; 30	CLT; 37	DOV; 15	MCH; 42	POC; 25	SON; 33	DAY; 12	CHI; 14	NHA; 15	POC; 43	IND; 24	GLN; 5	MCH; 23	BRI; 32	DAR; 40	RCH; 18	DOV; 15	KAN; 42	CLT; 17	MAR; 12	TAL; 41	PHO; 29	CAR; 41	HOM; 17	ATL; 16	NHA; 31	29th	2960
2002	Todd Bodine	66	Ford	DAY; 31	CAR; 32	LVS; 29	ATL	DAR	BRI	TEX	MAR	TAL	CAL	RCH	CLT	DOV	POC	MCH	SON	DAY	CHI																			47th	345
2002	Geoff Bodine	66	Ford																			NHA; 43	POC	IND	GLN	MCH	BRI	DAR	RCH	NHA										47th	345
2002	Hideo Fukuyama	66	Ford																												DOV; 39	KAN	TAL	CLT	MAR; 42		CAR; DNQ	PHO	HOM	47th	345
2002	Frank Kimmel	66	Ford																																	ATL; DNQ				47th	345
2003	Hideo Fukuyama	66	Ford	DAY	CAR	LVS; 33	ATL	DAR	BRI	TEX	TAL	MAR	CAL; DNQ	RCH; Wth	CLT	DOV	POC	MCH	SON; 43	DAY	CHI	NHA	POC	IND	GLN	MCH	BRI	DAR	RCH	NHA	DOV	TAL	KAN	CLT	MAR	ATL	PHO	CAR	HOM	63rd	98

== See also ==
Other teams owned by Carl Haas:

- Newman/Haas Racing
- Haas Lola
