= Mike Lanigan =

American racing owner

Michael Lanigan (born September 1, 1950 in Vinita, Oklahoma) is an entrepreneur and IndyCar Series team owner. He won the 2007 Champ Car championship with Sébastien Bourdais and the 2020 Indianapolis 500 with Takuma Sato.

In 1973, Lanigan founded a division of his father's company, Mi-Jack Construction Equipment, in Indianapolis. He returned to his hometown of Chicago, Illinois in 1989 to become the company's president. Mi-Jack produces rubber-tire gantry cranes, and in 1992, began sponsoring cars in CART and the Indianapolis 500. In 1993, Lanigan co-founded Walter Payton Power Equipment, a crane and heavy equipment distributor. He currently leads the Lanco Group, a conglomerate involved in cranes, industrial equipment, entertainment, motorsport interests, and a joint venture that operates the Panama Canal Railway.

Lanigan expanded into team ownership in 2001 by partnering with Éric Bachelart to co-own Conquest Racing, which competed in the IndyCar Series in 2001 and 2002, and in the Champ Car World Series from 2003 to 2006. After the 2007 season, he sold his interest in Conquest and joined Newman/Haas Racing, which was renamed Newman/Haas/Lanigan Racing. The team transitioned to the IndyCar Series following the unification of Champ Car and IndyCar in 2008. In 2007, Lanigan also held partial ownership of Carl A. Haas Motorsports in NASCAR. He left Newman/Haas in 2010 and, in December of that year, joined Rahal Letterman Racing, which was subsequently renamed Rahal Letterman Lanigan Racing. The team competes in both IndyCar and the WeatherTech SportsCar Championship.

Lanigan took over promoting Champ Car's Grand Prix of Houston in 2006 and the Grand Prix of Cleveland in 2007, though neither survived the merger to appear on the IndyCar Series schedule.
