= Port of Nansha =

Port of Nanshan
- Interactive map of Port of Nanshan

Location
- Country: China
- Location: Longxue Island, Guangdong
- Coordinates: 22°39′N 113°40′E

Details
- Opened: 2004; 22 years ago
- Operated by: The Guangzhou Port Group
- Owned by: The Guangzhou Port Group
- No. of berths: 16
- Draft depth: 17 metres (56 ft)

Statistics
- Annual container volume: 25.4 million TEUs (2023)

Port of Nansha, officially Nansha Port Area, is a port, which is one of the three port areas of the Port of Guangzhou. The port is located at the estuary of the Pearl River, about 35 nautical miles (65 km) from the sea. Its construction continued throughout the early 2000s, and began operations in 2004 as an integral part of the Port of Guangzhou. The port system consists of riverside deep-draft jetties.The port mainly handles large container ships; accommodates vessels with a draft of 17 metres (56 ft).

== Bibliography ==
- Jiang, Jian; Sun, Wanhua (2019). "The estimation of the facility efficiency in Nansha Port terminal" (PDF). Web of Proceedings. School of Traffic and Transportation, Beijing Jiaotong University, Beijing: Francis Academic Press, UK. doi:10.25236/iwass.2019.059.
