= Mi-Jack Products =

American crane manufacturer

Coordinates: 41.5856°N 87.6904°W

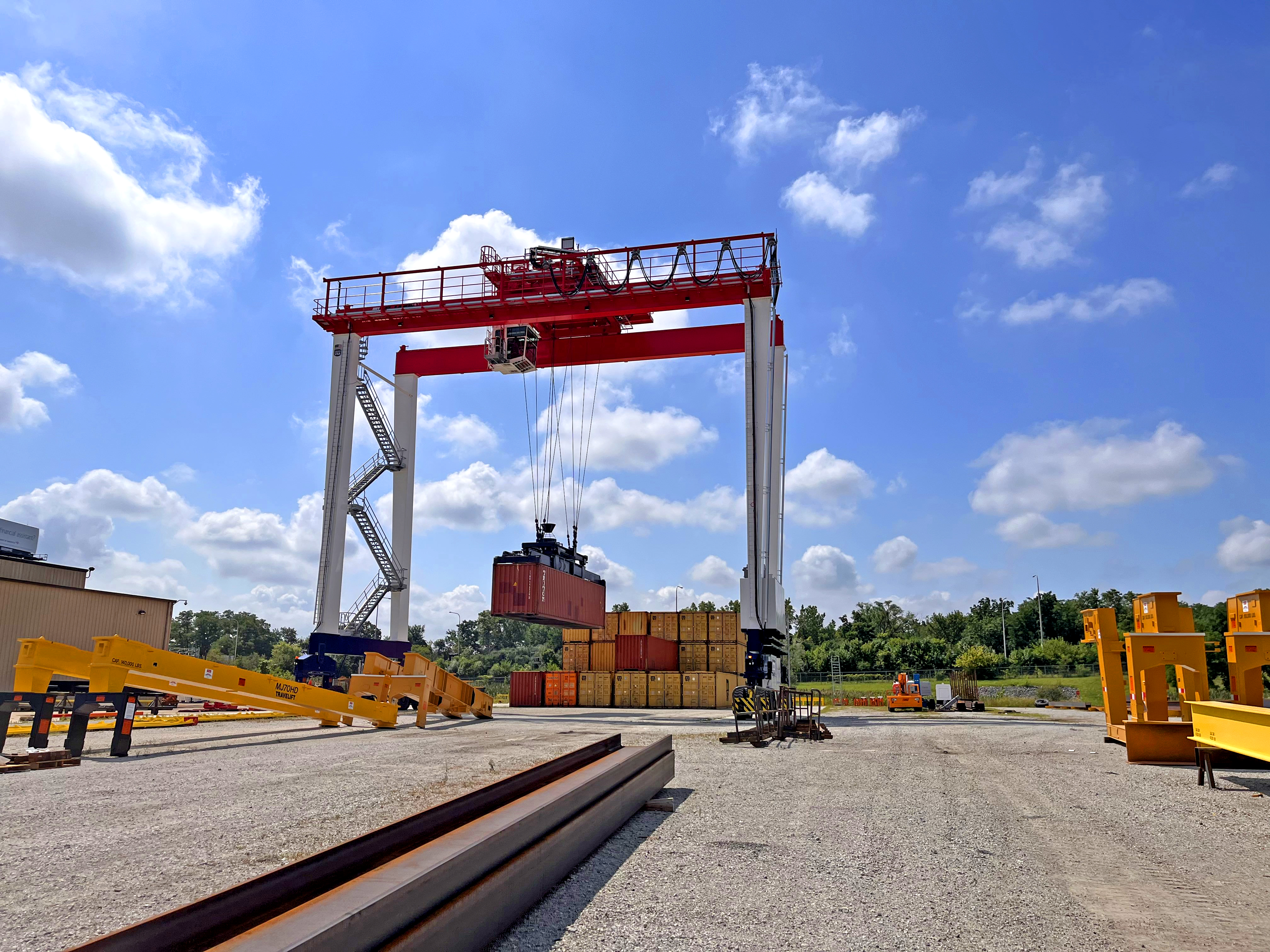
Translift Rubber Tired Gantry Crane at Mi-Jack

Mi-Jack Products is an American manufacturer of industrial, intermodal, and port cranes based in Hazel Crest, Illinois. It manufactures Travelift and Translift rubber-tired gantry cranes, as well as various other container handling systems and is a part of the Lanco Group of Companies.

== History ==
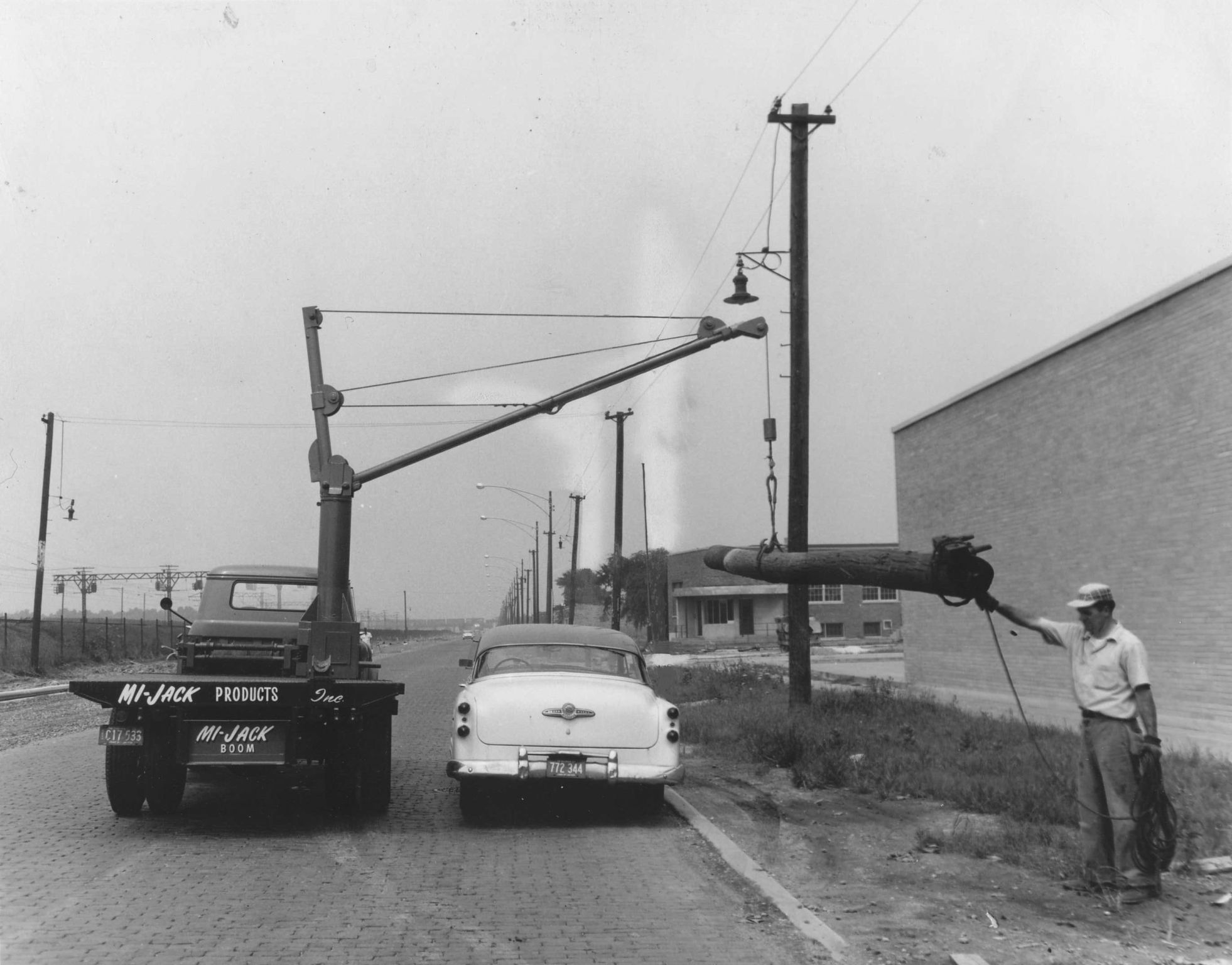
Jack Lanigan's boom crane lifting pole over car

=== Beginnings: 1954 ===
Mi-Jack Products was established in 1954 by Jack Lanigan Sr. in Chicago, Illinois. Lanigan named Mi-Jack Products after his two sons, Mike and Jack. During the 1960s Mi-Jack Products began distributing self-propelled rubber-tired gantry cranes. To further its expansion in the 1980s, Mi-Jack Products purchased the manufacturing rights to the cranes they had been selling, allowing them to enter new markets both nationally and internationally.

=== The Panama Canal Railroad: 1998 ===
Mi-Jack Products entered into railroad operations in the 1990s. In 1998 the Nation of Panama announced it was taking bids for a 50-year concession to rebuild and operate its 47.6-mile railroad stretching across the Isthmus of Panama. Lanigan banded with the Kansas City Southern Railway to submit a winning bid to operate the line, called the Panama Canal Railway Co.

=== The Lanco Group ===
In the early 2000s Mi-Jack formed The Lanco Group of Companies, a diverse group of companies specializing in disciplines: from material handling, terminal automation, supply chain, and sports & entertainment. Mike Lanigan is currently the president of Mi-Jack and the co-owner of the Lanco Group of Companies.

==== Lanco Material Handling Division ====
- Mi-Jack Products
- Western Pacific Crane & Equipment
- Walter Payton Power Equipment
- Broderson Manufacturing
- Liftking
- Greenfield Products

Lanco Supply Chain Division

- QProducts & Services
- Power In-Lock
- Panama Canal Railway Co

==== Lanco Sports & Entertainment Division ====
- Rahal Letterman Lanigan
- Black Tie Products

In 2026, Mi-Jack Products announced plans to open a manufacturing facility in the Monee Industrial Park in Monee, Illinois, expanding its manufacturing presence in the Chicago metropolitan area.

== Cranes ==
=== Travelift ===
The Mi-Jack Travelift is a rubber tired gantry crane used for a variety of applications, from steel and precast concrete, to manufacturing, wind, or bridge related lifting needs.

=== Translift ===
Mi-Jack's Translift rubber tired gantry cranes are used at rail intermodal terminals and may run on a hybrid battery system.

==== JL1400P ====
The JL1400P is a Translift RTG container crane from Mi-Jack. Made in the US and launched in 2022 it is designed for standard applications at ports and intermodal terminals.

== Technology ==
=== Mi-Star ===
Mi-Star is Mi-Jack Product's collision avoidance, virtual terminal visualization, inventory management and fleeting monitoring technology for rubber tired gantry cranes.

==== AccuTrack™ ====
AccuTrack™ is a container terminal productivity solution that provides personnel and asset tracking with optional work zone protection features. To ensure operational safety, the backreach area is divided into two distinct zones monitored by the AccuTrack system, which detects the presence of tagged personnel and provides real-time feedback to the straddle carrier operator:

- Safe Zone: When personnel are detected within this area, AccuTrack signals a green traffic light, indicating it is safe for the straddle carrier to continue operating.
- Unsafe Zone: If personnel enter this area, AccuTrack displays a red warning light, prompting the operator to stop the straddle carrier and wait until the personnel leave before resuming operation.

== Notable Projects ==
=== MTA Park Avenue Viaduct Replacement Project ===
In 2024 New York City's subway, MTA announced it's Park Avenue Viaduct (PAV) Replacement Project constructed by Halmar International. Halmar used two custom Mi-Jack gantry cranes that spanned across the PAV allowing them to remove and replace multiple spans of the viaduct while the MNR trains continued to run unobstructed.
