= Rubber tyred gantry crane =

Mobile crane used in intermodal operations to ground or stack containers

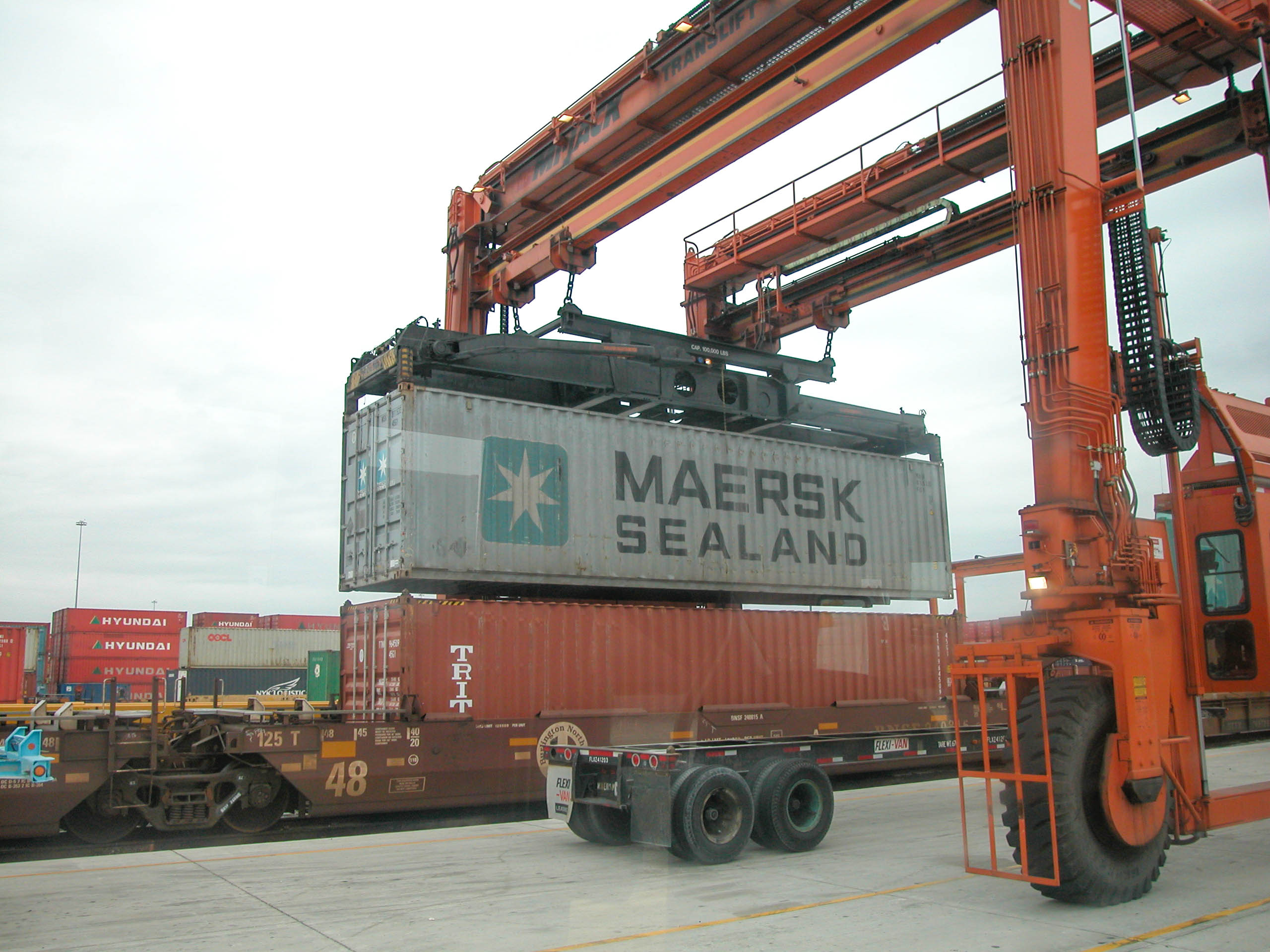
Rubber tyred gantry crane loading a 40 foot container

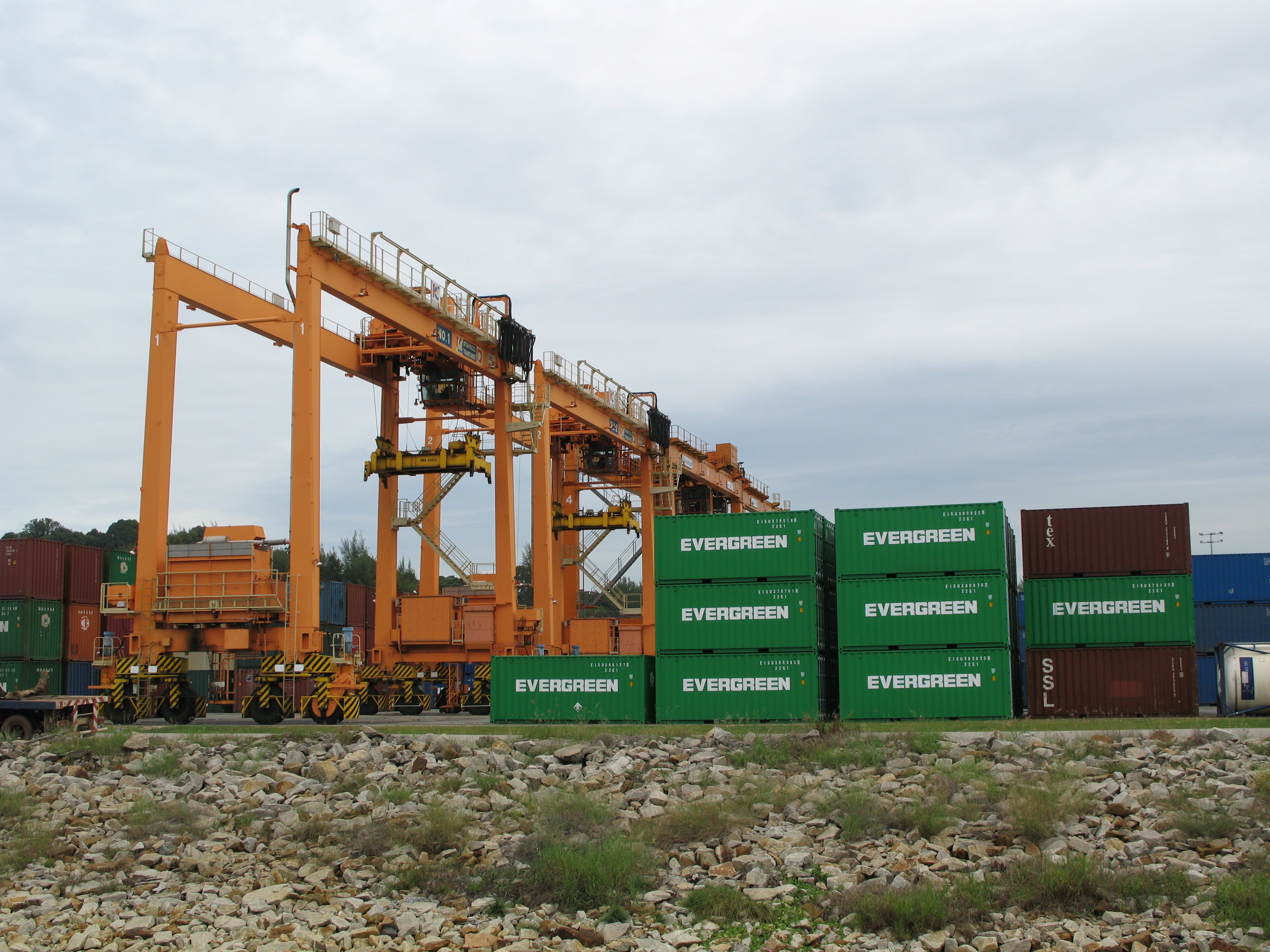
Kuantan Port container yard with rubber-tyred gantry crane.

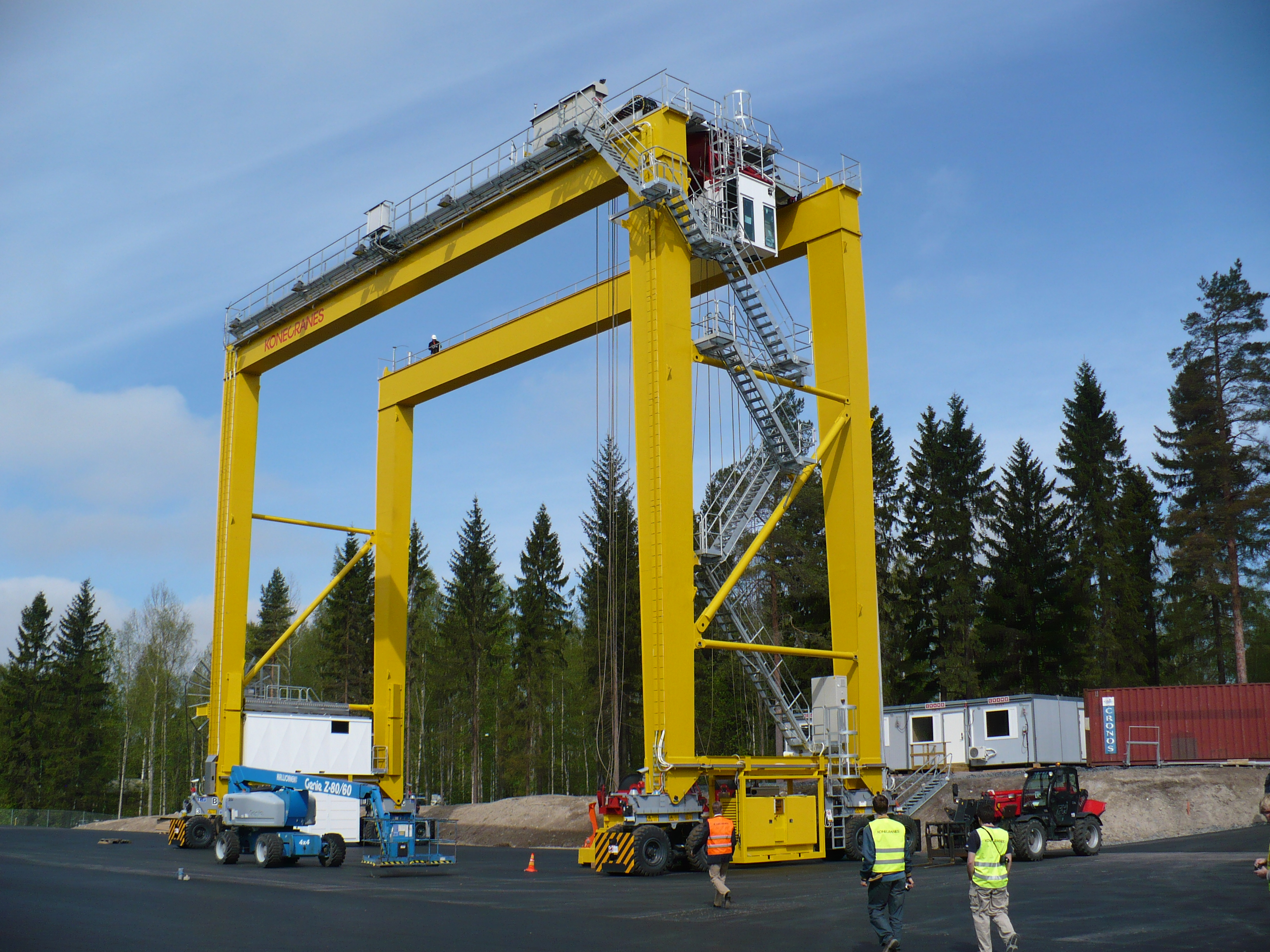
Rubber tyred gantry crane

A rubber tyred gantry crane (US: rubber tired gantry crane)/ RTG (crane), or sometimes transtainer, is a wheeled mobile gantry crane operated to ground or stack intermodal containers. Inbound containers are stored for future pickup by drayage trucks, and outbound are stored for future loading onto vessels. RTGs typically straddle multiple lanes, with one lane reserved for container transfers.

Being mobile, RTGs are often powered by diesel generator systems (gensets) of 100 to 600 kW (134 to 805 hp). Due to the lack of an electrical grid to dump energy when containers are being lowered they often have large resistor packs to rapidly dissipate the energy of a lowering or decelerating container. Diesel-powered RTGs are notorious polluters at ports, as each burns up to 10 US gallons per hour (8.3 imp gal/h; 38 L/h) of diesel fuel.

There are also electric rubber tired gantry cranes. The first electrified rubber-tyred gantry cranes (ERTG) in China was unveiled by the She Kou container terminal (SCT) in Shenzhen in Aug 2008. Rubber-tired gantry cranes are also being electrified at the Port of Long Beach to improve air quality, with funding from the California Energy Commission.

Aside from the intermodal industry, RTGs also are extensively used in industry. Applications include erecting large unbalanced structures, assembling large manufacturing components, positioning pipelines, and bridge construction.

Some RTGs use automation technology at ports to reduce human involvement in processing and handling cargo. Automation technology is used to optimize, track, or communicate container movements (e.g., automated gate systems), as well as automated cargo handling equipment to load, unload, and move containers.

== See also ==
- Tire
