= East Port Said Industrial Zone =

Egyptian industrial zone

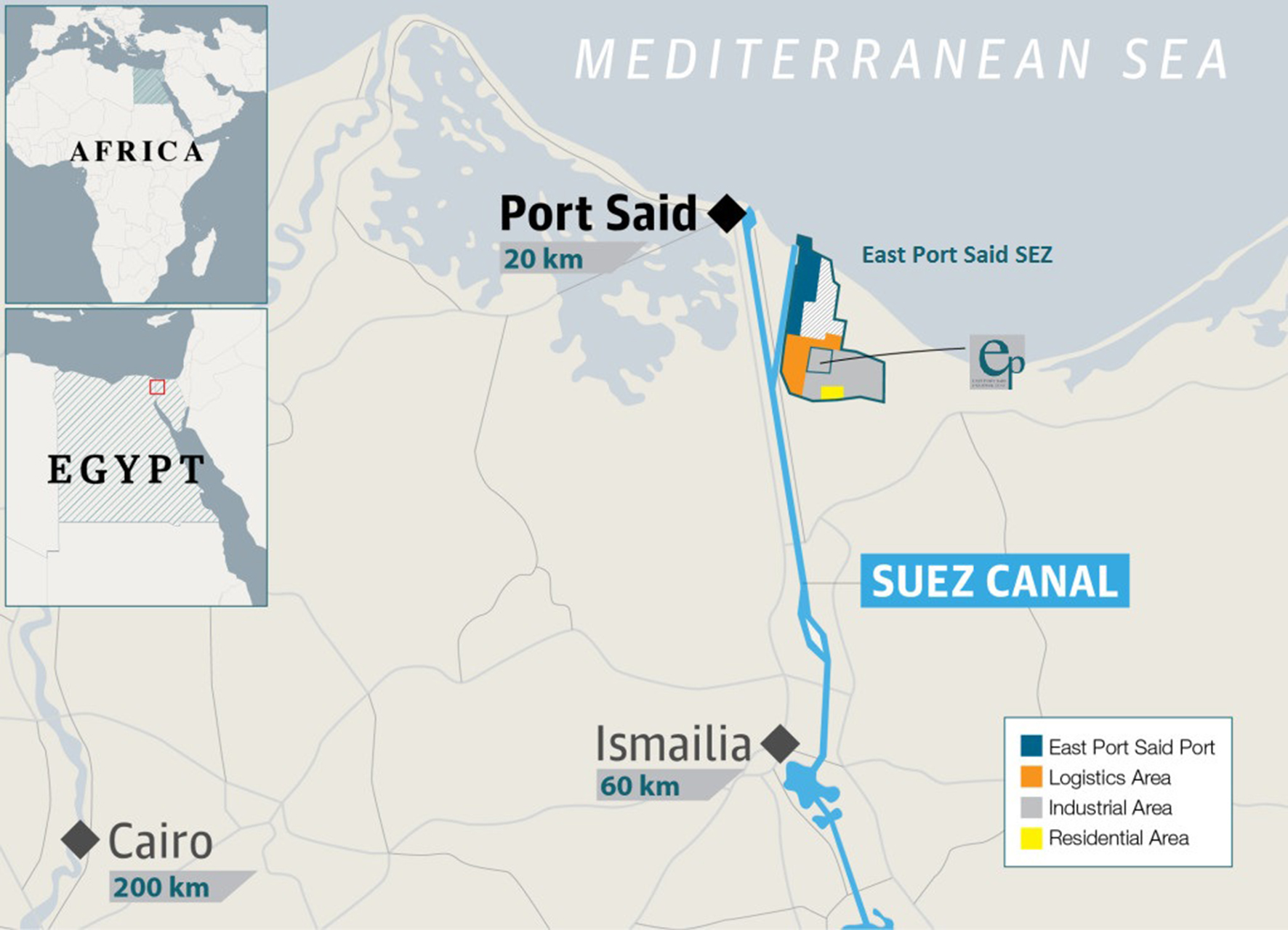

East Port Said Industrial Zone is an industrial park with a total area of 1600 ha in Port Fuad, Egypt. The main developer and promoter of the park is East Port Said Development Co; it is located at the northern end of the Suez Canal Special Economic Zone. According to Benchmarkia, East Port Said Industrial Zone ranks among the top 20 largest industrial parks by area.

The government provides a number of incentives to investors in the scheme including zero tax and duties on tools, machines and raw materials related to the production of goods for export.

== Industry ==
The park includes medium and light industries such as:

- Automobile Assembly Parts
- Construction and Building Material
- Home Appliances and Electronics
- Textile and Ready-made Garment
- Agri-Business and Food Processing
- Pharmaceutical
- East Port Said Port
- ICT
- General Industries
