= List of Panamax ports =

A Panamax port is a deep water port that can accommodate a fully laden Panamax ship. With the completion of the Panama Canal expansion project in 2016, this list will need to be significantly revised due to larger "post panamax" ships transiting Panama. Other lists are required for even bigger Valemax and Chinamax ships.

== Africa ==
=== Mediterranean Sea ===
Port	Country	Notes
Tanger-Med	Morocco	
Djendjen (Jijel)	Algeria	
Port Said	Egypt	

=== Atlantic Ocean ===
==== Active (north to south) ====
Port	Country	Notes
Nouadhibou	Mauritania	Iron ore terminal
Nouakchott	Mauritania	Proposed railhead for phosphate mine
Port Kamsar	Guinea	Bauxite loading port; origin of Kamsarmax ship type
Monrovia	Liberia	Proposed deepening to 20m for 200,000t vessels
Sekondi-Takoradi	Ghana	Built 1928
Tema	Ghana	Built 1961
Cotonou	Benin	
Lomé	Togo	
Lekki Deep Sea Port	Nigeria	Began operations April 2023; currently the largest deep water port in Africa. Designed for post-Panamax vessels
Ibom Deep Sea Port	Nigeria	Undergoing implementation
Kribi	Cameroon	Oil terminal; iron ore from Mbalam and Nabela (300,000 tonnes); bauxite (future)
Owendo	Gabon	Railhead
São Tomé e Príncipe	São Tomé and Príncipe	Island transhipment port
Lobito	Angola	
Walvis Bay	Namibia	Railhead
Saldanha Bay	South Africa	

==== Proposed (north to south) ====
Port	Country	Notes
Bargny	Senegal	
Matakong	Guinea	Deepwater port for Simandou and Kalia iron ore
Tagrin Point	Sierra Leone	For iron ore
Dadia	Liberia	Liberty Corridor
San Pédro, Côte d'Ivoire	Côte d'Ivoire	For iron ore
Port Notel Ocean Terminal, Ibeno Akwa-Ibom	Nigeria	
Ikot Akpatek, Akwa-Ibom	Nigeria	Proposed
Lolabé	Cameroon	Iron ore export
Malabo	Equatorial Guinea	
Santa Clara, Gabon	Gabon	Proposed deepwater port with railhead for Makokou iron ore
Indienne, Congo	Republic of the Congo	
Barra do Dande (Bengo Province)	Angola	
Shearwater Bay	Namibia	Coal; 30 km south of Luderitz

=== Red Sea ===
Port	Country
Berbera	Somalia
Port Sudan	Sudan
Massawa	Eritrea
Bosaso Port	Somalia

=== Indian Ocean ===
==== Active (north to south) ====
Port	Country	Notes
Mogadishu	Somalia	
Kismayo	Somalia	
Kilindini Harbour, Mombasa	Kenya	
Mtwara	Tanzania	
Nacala	Mozambique	Railhead for Malawi
Richards Bay	South Africa	
Ngqura	South Africa	

==== Proposed (north to south) ====
Port	Country
Garacad	Somalia
Lamu Port, Lamu	Kenya
Bagamoyo Port	Tanzania
Pangani	Tanzania
Pemba	Mozambique
Technobanine Point	Mozambique

== Americas ==
=== Canada ===
Port	Ocean	Notes
Port of Churchill	Arctic	Terminal on Hudson Bay; handles grain, bulk commodities, general cargo, and tanker vessels
Sept-Îles	Atlantic	Iron ore terminal on the Saint Lawrence River
Port Cartier	Atlantic	Iron ore terminal on the Saint Lawrence River
Quebec City	Atlantic	Deepwater terminal on the Saint Lawrence River; gateway to the Great Lakes; accommodates Panamax and Capesize vessels; 50 ft water at low tide
Port of Montreal	Atlantic	
Chandler	Atlantic	Large deepwater wharf
Melford Terminal (proposed)	Atlantic	Deepwater terminal on the Strait of Canso
Port of Saint John	Atlantic	Deepwater port in the Bay of Fundy
Port of Halifax	Atlantic	Most easterly North American full-service container port
Sydney	Atlantic	
Port of Prince Rupert	Pacific	Deep sea port with direct rail connections to major North American cities
Port Alberni	Pacific	Fjord-like channel navigable by deep sea vessels and cruise ships
Port of Vancouver	Pacific	Modern port of entry on the west coast of Canada
Squamish Terminals	Pacific	Breakbulk terminal specializing in forestry, steel, and project cargo
Crofton	Pacific	Unusual depth for the east coast of Vancouver Island
Kitimat	Pacific	Year-round deep-sea shipping; accessible by Panamax, VLCC, and ULCC vessels up to 320,000 DWT

=== Greenland ===
Port	Ocean	Notes
Thule Air Base	Arctic	Northernmost deepwater port in the world

=== United States ===
Port	Ocean	Notes
Port of Boston	Atlantic	
Port of New York and New Jersey	Atlantic	Includes Port Newark-Elizabeth Marine Terminal and Port Jersey
Port of Philadelphia	Atlantic	
Port of Wilmington	Atlantic	
Port of Baltimore	Atlantic	
Hampton Roads	Atlantic	Complex includes Port of Virginia and Naval Station Norfolk
Port of Morehead City	Atlantic	
Port of Charleston	Atlantic	
Port of Savannah	Atlantic	
Port of Jacksonville	Atlantic	
Port Canaveral	Atlantic	
Port Everglades	Atlantic	
Port of Miami	Atlantic	
Port Corpus Christi	Gulf of Mexico	Fifth-largest US port by total tonnage; Panamax vessels handled at Bulk Terminal
Port of Tampa	Gulf of Mexico	
Port of Mobile	Gulf of Mexico	Only deepwater port in Alabama
Port of New Orleans	Gulf of Mexico	
Port of Beaumont	Gulf of Mexico	
Port of Galveston	Gulf of Mexico	Oldest port on the Gulf Coast west of New Orleans
Port of Houston	Gulf of Mexico	Tenth-busiest port in world by tonnage
Port of Seattle	Pacific	
Port of Tacoma	Pacific	
Port Madison	Pacific	Deepwater bay on Puget Sound
Port Angeles	Pacific	
Port of Grays Harbor	Pacific	
Port of Longview	Pacific	
Port of Kalama	Pacific	
Port of Vancouver USA	Pacific	
Port of Portland	Pacific	Three post-Panamax terminals
Port of Coos Bay	Pacific	Oregon's second busiest seaport
Port of Humboldt Bay	Pacific	Only deepwater port in California north of San Francisco Bay
Port of Richmond	Pacific	
Port of Stockton	Pacific	California's farthest-inland deepwater port
Port of Oakland	Pacific	Channel is 50 ft deep and 800 ft wide
Port of Redwood City	Pacific	
Port of Hueneme	Pacific	Only deepwater port between Los Angeles and San Francisco; only military deepwater port between San Diego Bay and Puget Sound
Port of Los Angeles	Pacific	Busiest port in the United States
Port of Long Beach	Pacific	One of the busiest container ports in the world
Port of San Diego	Pacific	Home to bulk of the United States Navy Pacific Carrier Fleet; only the first nine miles (14 km) accessible to Panamax vessels

=== Latin America and the Caribbean ===
Port	Country	Ocean	Notes
Buenos Aires	Argentina	Atlantic	
Bahía Blanca	Argentina	Atlantic	
Quequén	Argentina	Atlantic	
Santos	Brazil	Atlantic	
Tubarão, Vitória	Brazil	Atlantic	Largest iron ore embarking port in the world; receives ships up to 350,000 tonnes
Ponta da Madeira	Brazil	Atlantic	
Ponta Ubu	Brazil	Atlantic	
Guaiba	Brazil	Atlantic	Iron ore export terminal operated by Vale in Sepetiba Bay
Itaguaí, Rio de Janeiro	Brazil	Atlantic	Iron ore export terminal operated by Vale in Sepetiba Bay
Port of Montevideo	Uruguay	Atlantic	
Port of Paranaguá	Brazil	Atlantic	Commodities
Port of Rio Grande	Brazil	Atlantic	Commodities
Barranquilla, Colombia	Colombia	Caribbean	
Bridgetown	Barbados	Caribbean	Dredging project (2002) now allows world's largest cruise ships
Grand Bahama (Freeport Container Port)	Bahamas	Caribbean	
Cartagena, Colombia	Colombia	Caribbean	
Ciénaga	Colombia	Caribbean	Coal export port
Colón	Panama	Caribbean	
Boca Grande, Venezuela	Venezuela	Caribbean	Iron ore transfer station
Port Lafito	Haiti	Caribbean	Port-au-Prince
Port of the Americas (Port of Ponce)	Puerto Rico	Caribbean	Post-Panamax capable; controlling depth of 50 feet (15 m)
Port of Mariel	Cuba	Gulf of Mexico	Neo-Panamax
Buenaventura	Colombia	Pacific	
Valparaíso	Chile	Pacific	
Manta	Ecuador	Pacific	
Puerto Bolívar	Ecuador	Pacific	
Port of Ensenada, Baja California	Mexico	Pacific	
Port of Lázaro Cárdenas	Mexico	Pacific	
Manzanillo, Colima	Mexico	Pacific	

==== Proposed ====
Port	Country	Notes
Punta Colonet, Baja California	Mexico	
Posorja	Ecuador	

== Asia ==
=== Bangladesh ===
==== Proposed ====
- Matarbari Port

=== Brunei ===
Port	Notes
Muara	Brunei's only deepwater port

=== Cambodia ===
Port
Port of Sihanoukville

=== China ===
- Anqing
- Beihai
- Caofeidian
- Dalian
- Dandong
- Dongguan
- Fangchenggang
- Foshan
- Fuzhou
- Guangzhou
- Haikou
- Huanghua
- Huizhou
- Huludao
- Humen
- Jiangyin
- Jiaxing
- Jingtang
- Jinzhou
- Lianyungang
- Lianyungang
- Longkou
- Luzhou
- Macun
- Maoming
- Meizhou
- Nanjing
- Nantong
- New Seaport
- Ningbo-Zhoushan
- Qingdao
- Qinhuangdao
- Qinzhou
- Quanzhou
- Rizhao
- Shanghai
- Shantou
- Shenzhen
- South Port
- Suzhou
- Taizhou
- Tianjin
- Weihai
- Wenzhou
- Wuhan
- Xiamen
- Xiuying
- Yangjiang
- Yangpu
- Yangshan
- Yangzhou
- Yantai
- Yantian
- Yingkou
- Yueyang
- Zhangzhou
- Zhanjiang
- Zhenjiang
- Zhongshan
- Zhuhai

=== Hong Kong ===
Port
Kwai Chung / Tsing Yi
Tuen Mun

=== India ===
==== Active ====
Port	Notes
Cochin Port, Kochi	
Dhamra Port	
Gangavaram Port	
Jawaharlal Nehru Port Trust, Navi Mumbai	
Kakinada Port	
Krishnapatnam Port, Krishnapatnam	
Vizhinjam International Seaport Thiruvananthapuram	Trivandrum Seaport

==== Under construction ====
- Keni Port
- Machilipatnam Port
- Mulapeta Port
- Ramayapatnam Port
- Vadhavan Port

==== Proposed ====
- Port of Dahej, Bharuch, Gujarat
- Dadanpatrabar Port, West Bengal
- Tajpur Port, West Bengal

=== Japan ===
Port	Notes
Port of Yokohama	Post-Panamax multi-purpose port
Kashima	Container, dry and wet bulk, and general cargo
Fukuyama	Multi-purpose and dry bulk

=== Malaysia ===
Port	Notes
Port of Tanjung Pelepas	
Johor Port	
Melaka Gateway Deep Sea Port	Planned

=== Myanmar ===
==== Active ====
- Thilawa Port
- Dawei Port

==== Proposed ====
- Kyaukphyu — for import of oil to China

=== Pakistan ===
Port
Port Qasim
Gwadar Port
Port of Karachi

=== Philippines ===
Port
Port of Manila
Batangas International Port
Port of Subic
Mabini Bulk Grains Terminal

=== Saudi Arabia ===
Port
Dammam
Jeddah Seaport

=== Singapore ===
- Port of Singapore

=== Sri Lanka ===
Port
Colombo
Hambantota

=== Taiwan ===
- Kaohsiung

=== Thailand ===
- Laem Chabang (1991)

=== United Arab Emirates ===
- Jebel Ali/Dubai

=== Vietnam ===
==== Active ====
- Cai Mep Thi Vai Port

==== Proposed ====
- Van Phong Port

== Europe ==
=== Nordic / Baltic ===
Port	Country	Notes
Reyðarfjörður	Iceland	
Narvik	Norway	Northern Norway
Karmsund	Norway	South-western Norway
Gothenburg	Sweden	Largest port in Scandinavia (west coast)
Aarhus	Denmark	Post-Panamax; main port of Denmark
Gdynia	Poland	Baltimax, post-Panamax; 3rd biggest port of Poland
Gdańsk	Poland	Baltimax, post-Panamax; main port of Poland
Norrköping	Sweden	East coast
Södertälje	Sweden	Stockholm
Helsinki	Finland	Post-Panamax; main port of Finland
Kokkola	Finland	Capesize; mainly bulk
Port of Pori	Finland	
Tallinn	Estonia	
Sillamäe	Estonia	
Klaipėda	Lithuania	
Port of Ventspils	Latvia	
Freeport of Riga	Latvia	

=== North Sea / Mainland ===
Port	Country	Notes
JadeWeserPort, Wilhelmshaven	Germany	Oil, coal, chemicals
Port of Amsterdam	Netherlands	North Holland
IJmuiden	Netherlands	North Holland
Rotterdam	Netherlands	Post-Panamax; largest port in Europe
Zeebrugge	Belgium	West Flanders
Antwerp	Belgium	
Dunkirk	France	Liquid and bulk handling
Le Havre	France	Oil, coal, chemicals, containers; draft up to 82 ft
Zeeland Seaports	Netherlands	Ports of Vlissingen and Terneuzen

=== Iberia and Mediterranean ===
Port	Country	Notes
Algeciras	Spain	Andalusia
Barcelona	Spain	Catalonia
Cagliari	Italy	Sardinia
Gijón	Spain	Asturias; draft up to 59 ft
Gioia Tauro	Italy	Southern Italy
Marseille-Fos Port	France	
Omišalj	Croatia	Supertanker oil terminal
Port of Rijeka	Croatia	
Port of Genoa	Italy	
Port of Lisbon	Portugal	
Sines	Portugal	
Port of Piraeus	Greece	Athens
Port of Thessaloniki	Greece	
Port of Koper	Slovenia	Post-Panamax
Port of Trieste	Italy	Draft up to 18m / 59 ft

=== Great Britain ===
Port	Location	Notes
Southampton	English Channel	Post-Panamax; traditional liner port
Teesport	Middlesbrough, North Sea	
Falmouth	Cornwall, Atlantic Ocean	
Port of Tyne	Newcastle, North Sea	
Felixstowe	North Sea	Post-Panamax; 35% of UK container traffic
Barrow	Irish Sea	
Liverpool	Irish Sea	Post-Panamax terminal under construction; accommodates cruise ships up to 345 metres (1,132 ft) length and 10 metres (33 ft) draught
Port Talbot	Bristol Channel	
Milford Haven	Irish Sea	
Invergordon	Moray Firth	
Hunterston Terminal	Firth of Clyde	
Hound Point	Firth of Forth	
London Gateway	Thurrock, Thames Estuary	
Portland Port	Portland Harbour, English Channel	

=== Ireland ===
Port	Notes
Cork	Deep water multi-modal port; south coast of Ireland; Celtic Sea/Atlantic Ocean
Aughinish	
Moneypoint	

=== Ukraine ===
Port	Notes
Port of Odesa	Black Sea

== Oceania ==
=== Australia ===
(clockwise from north)

Port	Notes
Port of Townsville	Military port; mineral ores, fertilizer, concentrates, sugar, motor vehicles; accommodates 4 Panamax vessels simultaneously
Abbot Point	Coal export terminal
Dalrymple Bay	Coal export terminal; part of Hay Point, Queensland
Hay Point	BHP Mitsubishi Alliance coal export terminal
Gladstone	Coal
Brisbane	Coal, containers
Newcastle	Coal, wheat
Port Botany (Sydney)	Containers
Port Kembla	Coal, wheat, cars
Melbourne	
Geelong	
Portland, Victoria	
Adelaide Outer Harbor	Deepened to Post-Panamax in 2006
Port Giles	
Port Bonython	Capesize; oil, LPG, diesel; proposed iron ore pending approval
Whyalla, South Australia	65,000t ships in inner harbor; Capesize iron ore bulkers serviced in Spencer Gulf via transhipment
Port Lincoln	Grain
Fremantle	
Geraldton	
Oakajee Port	Under construction
Dampier	North-west Western Australia; iron ore
Cape Lambert	Upgrade from 80 mtpa to 180 mtpa
Port Hedland	North-west Western Australia; iron ore
East Arm Wharf (Port of Darwin)	Panamax

=== New Zealand ===
Port	City
Ports of Auckland	Auckland
Lyttelton	Christchurch
Marsden Point	Whangārei
Port Taranaki	New Plymouth
Port Chalmers	Dunedin
Port of Tauranga	Tauranga
CentrePort	Wellington

(Source: Recount, Taranaki District Council newsletter, page 5.)

=== Other ===
Port	Location	Notes
Apra Harbor	Guam	Deepwater port on the western side of Guam

== Maps ==
- Africa
- South East Asia

== See also ==
- Dry port
- Marine transfer operations
- Merchant vessel
- Petroleum transport
