= List of ports and harbours of Andhra Pradesh =

Operational Seaports excluding fishing harbors in Andhra Pradesh'"`UNIQ--ref-00000006-QINU`"'

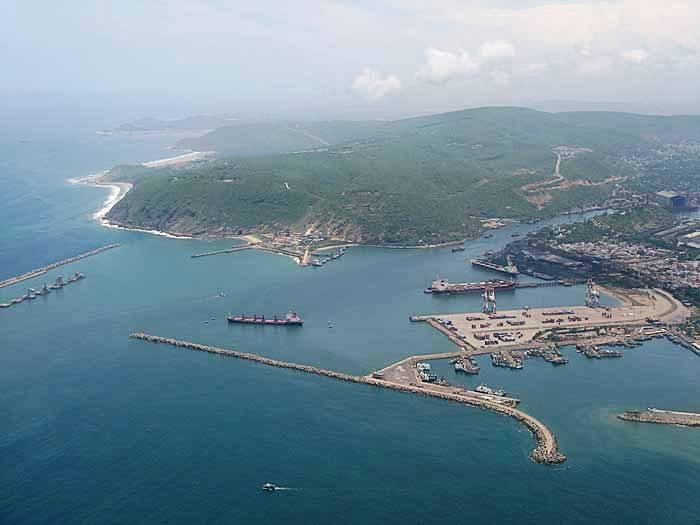
Vizag Seaport aerial view

Andhra Pradesh has the 2nd longest coastline of 974 km in the eastern peninsular India, which accounts for 12% of the country's total coastline with one major (Operational) and 14 non–major (5 Operational) ports, with six ports under development in the PPP mode.

== Cargo handling ==
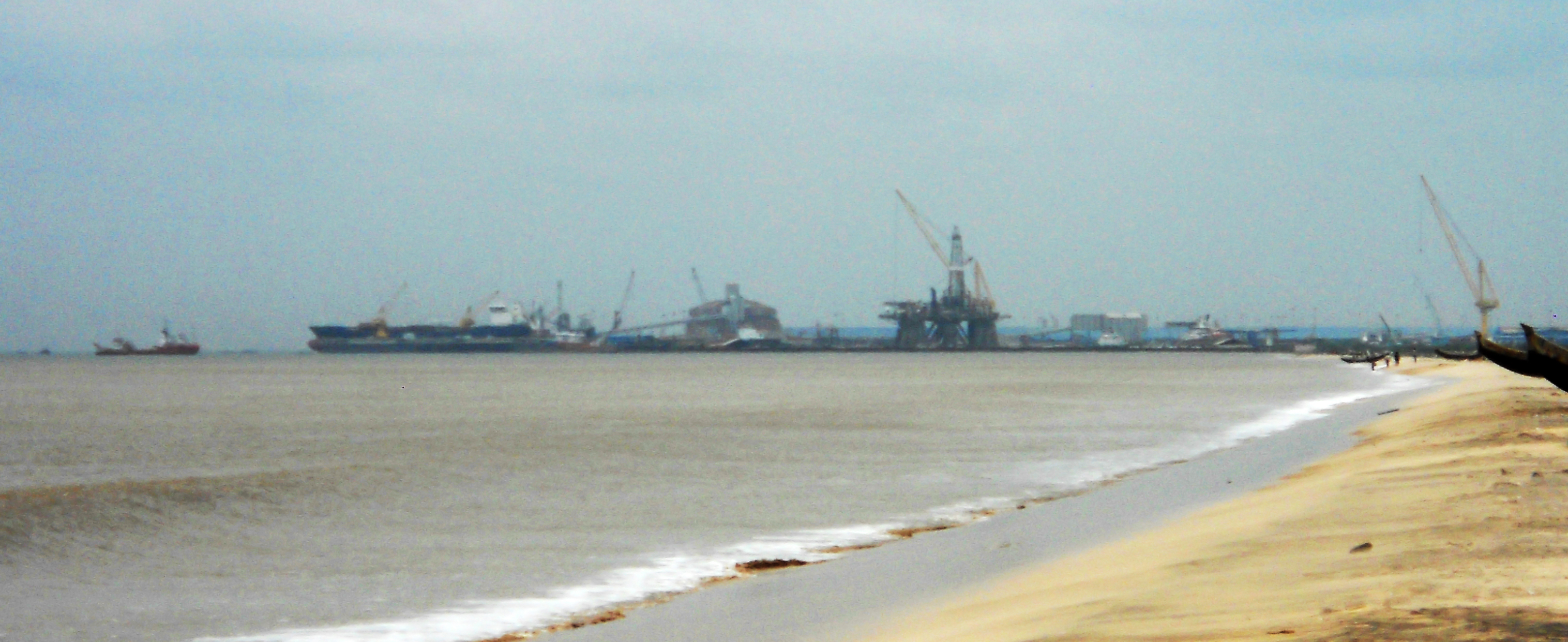
View of Kakinada port from Beach

The state's ports handled 73 million tons of cargo in financial year 2015–16. The state of Andhra Pradesh is the second maritime state (after Gujarat) in terms of cargo handled by Non-Major Ports and the third maritime state (after Gujarat and Maharashtra) in terms of overall cargo handled including Visakhapatnam port trust .

Port Wise Cargo Handled in Financial Year 2017-18
S.No.	Port	Traffic Handled-FY 15-16 (in MMT)
1	Visakhapatnam Port	57
2	Gangavaram Port	20
3	Kakinada Deep Water	15
4	Kakinada Anchorage	2
5	Rawa	1
6	Krishnapatnam Port	35

=== Exports and imports ===
Exported products are Rice, Wheat, Maize, Soya bean meal and retraction, Rice bran extraction, Bentonite, Fibre, Fish Meal, Tobacco, Sand, Cement Iron ore, Cement clinker, Minerals etc. Some of the imports include Murate of Potash, Rock phosphate, Urea, Crude Palm Oil, Edible oils, Chemicals, Gases, Wood pulp, Machineries etc. Lightering of Crude oil also takes place.

== List ==
The state has one major port at Visakhapatnam under the administrative control of Central government and 15 notified ports inclusive of 3 captive ports under the control of state government.

List of ports and harbours in Andhra Pradesh
Location	Name	Type	Category	Functional status	Owned/operated
Anakapalli	Nakkapalli Port	Captive Jetty	Minor	Operational	
East Godavari	Kakinada Fishing Harbour	Fishing Harbour	Minor	Operational	
Guntur	Nizampatnam Port	Green Field Port	Minor	Proposed	
Guntur	Nizampatnam Fishing Harbour	Fishing Harbour	Minor	Operational	
Kakinada	Kakinada Port	Anchorage Port; SEZ Port; Deep Water Port	Minor	Operational	
Kakinada	Ravva Port	Captive Port	Minor	Operational	
Krishna	Machilipatnam Port	Green Field Port	Minor	Re-development	Government of Andhra Pradesh
Krishna	Machilipatnam Fishing Harbour	Fishing Harbour	Minor	Operational	Government of Andhra Pradesh
Nellore	Krishnapatnam Port	Deep Water Port	Minor	Operational	KPCL
Nellore	Ramayapatnam Port	Deep Water Port	Minor	Proposed	Government of Andhra Pradesh
Prakasam	Vodarevu Port	Green Field Port	Minor	Proposed	
Srikakulam	Bhavanapadu Fishing Harbour	Fishing Harbour	Minor	Operational	
Srikakulam	Kalingapatnam Port	Green Field Port	Minor	Proposed	
Srikakulam	Meghavaram Port	Captive Port	Minor	Proposed	
Srikakulam	Mulapeta Port	Green Field Port	Minor	Proposed	Government of Andhra Pradesh
Visakhapatnam	Bheemunipatnam Port	Green Field Port	Minor	Proposed	
Visakhapatnam	Gangavaram Port	Deep Water Port	Minor	Operational	Gangavaram Port Ltd.
Visakhapatnam	Mutyalammapalem Port	Green Field Port	Minor	Proposed	
Visakhapatnam	Visakhapatnam Port	Outer Harbour; Inner Harbour	Major	Operational	Government of India
Visakhapatnam	Visakhapatnam Fishing Harbour	Fishing Harbour	Major	Operational	Government of India
West Godavari	Narasapur Port	Green Field Port	Minor	Proposed	
