= Wenzhou Bay =

Roadstead in Zhejiang, China

- 温州湾
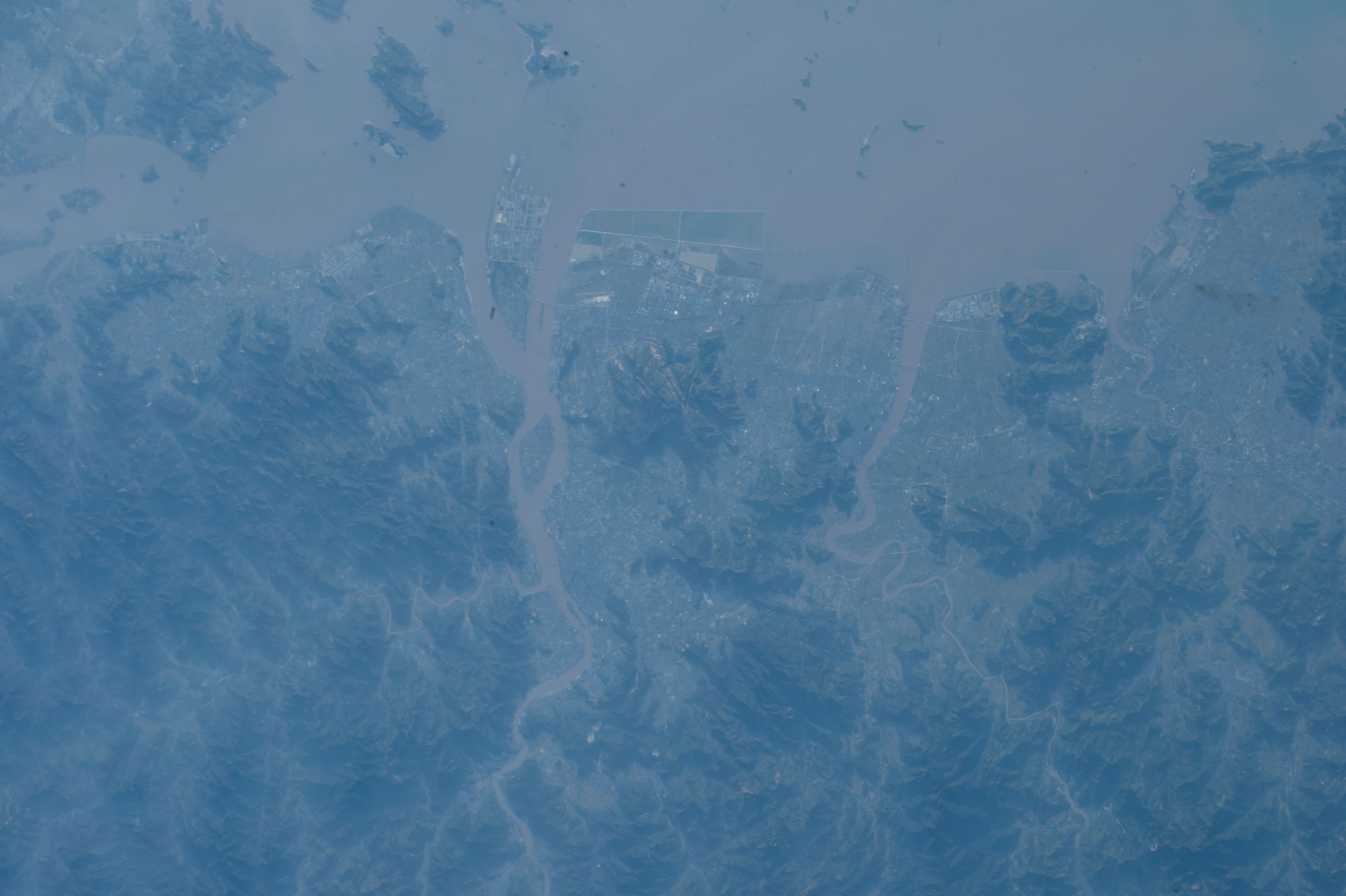
- Wenzhou coastline from the outer space
- Interactive map of Wenzhou Bay
- Location: Off Wenzhou, Zhejiang, China
- Coordinates: 27°55′31.36″N 121°2′56.12″E
- Primary inflows: Ou River, Feiyun River, Ao River, etc.
- Catchment area: 23,000 km^{2} (8,900 sq mi)
- Basin countries: China
- Surface area: 1,473.69 km^{2} (568.99 sq mi)
- Frozen: Never

Wenzhou Bay (Chinese: 温州湾) is a roadstead located off the coast of Wenzhou, Zhejiang, China. The name originally referred specifically to the estuarine bay at the mouth of the Ou River. It later gradually evolved into a broader term denoting the open sea area enclosed by the Dongtou Islands to the north, the Wenzhou coastal plain to the west, bordering the Yueqing Bay.

Wenzhou Bay is an important stopover and wintering ground for migratory birds along the East Asian–Australasian Flyway, with more than one hundred thousand birds passing through or overwintering there each year. Within the bay, the combined influence of tidal currents, river runoff, and the segmentation effect of islands has created multiple flow channels and extensive intertidal shoals. Notable features include the Wenzhou Shoal, which formed to the southeast of Lingkun Island and connects underwater with the Yangshe sand spit of Niyu Island, both of which affect navigation into and out of the Port of Wenzhou. Large-scale land reclamation in the 2000s gradually converted parts of the bay into land, significantly altering the local tidal regime and raising widespread concern over the destruction of habitats for migratory birds, especially the black-faced spoonbill.

== Geography ==
Earlier sources, including the Draft History of Qing (1928), used "Wenzhou Bay" to denote the mouth of the Ou River, which is sheltered from the open sea by Lingkun Island. Later definitions broadened the term to encompass the waters associated with the Dongtou Islands. Under this broader usage, Wenzhou Bay adjoins Yueqing Bay to the northeast, extends westwards to the Shuicheng area near Tongpan Island, and reaches southwards to Damen Island and Niyu Island. The bay measures roughly 25 km (16 mi) from east to west and about 20 km (12 mi) from north to south, covering an area of approximately 500 km^{2} (190 sq mi).

Modern sources, such as the China Bay Gazetteer (1993), note that Wenzhou Bay lacks a distinct bay shape beyond the estuarine bays of the Ou River, Feiyun River, and Ao River; in essence, it is an open sea area enclosed by the Wenzhou coastal plain and the Dongtou Islands. Zhejiang provincial government once defined Wenzhou Bay as extending northwards to the line between Qitouzui in Yueqing and Dawuxing, where it adjoins Yueqing Bay. Its eastern boundary runs sequentially through Xiaomen Island, Damen Island, Qingshan Island, Zhuangyuan'ao, Sanpan Island, Dongtou Island, Banping Mountain, Beice Island, Nance Island, and Beilong Mountain, while its southern boundary reaches Pingyangzui in Cangnan County. The designated sea area spans 27°27′55″ to 27°59′09″ N and 120°35′50″ to 121°11′30″ E.
