= Jiao River (Zhejiang) =

Coordinates: 28.6778°N 121.5269°E

Jiao River Ling River
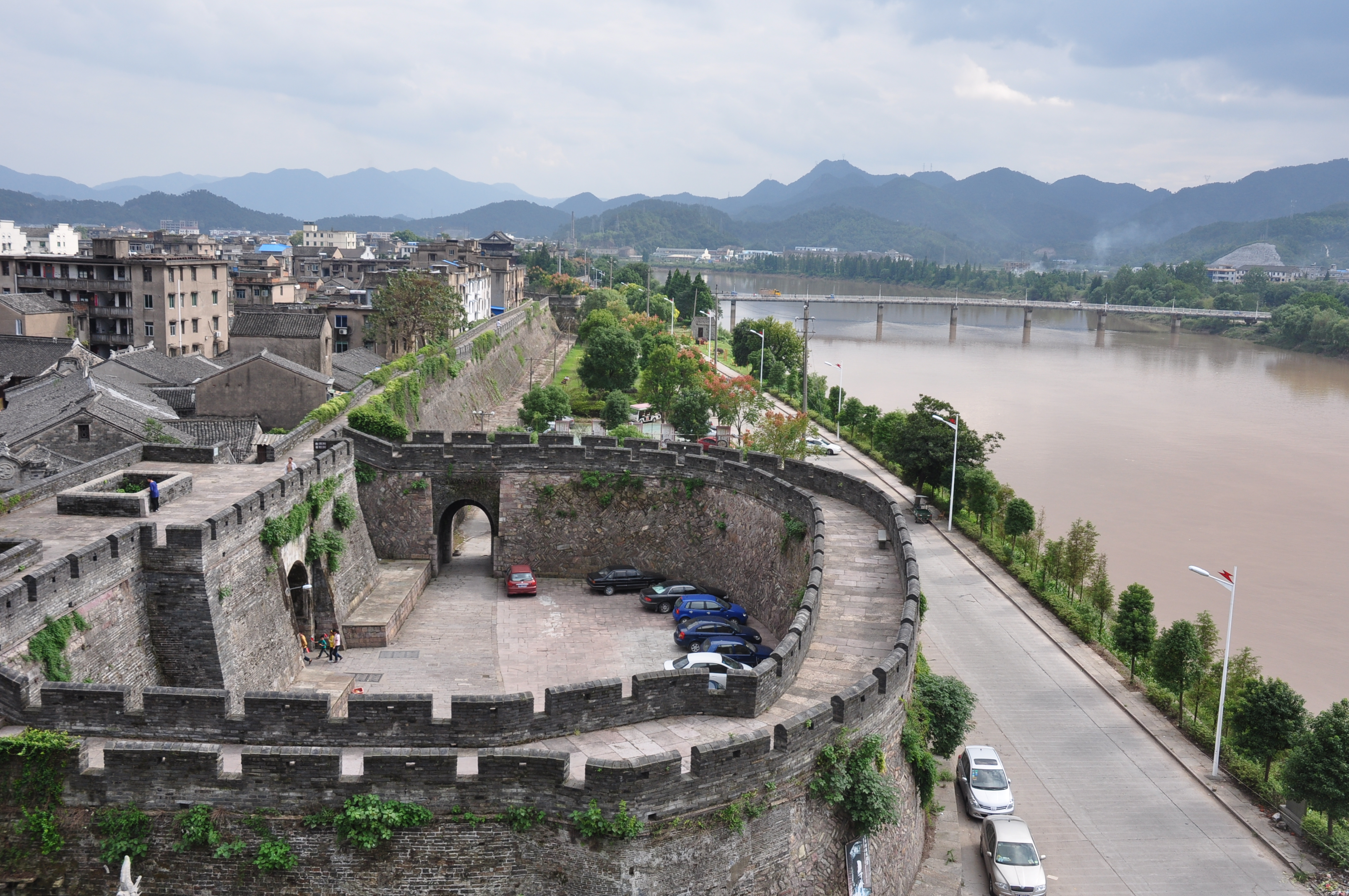
- The Ling River in Linhai, next to the city wall
- Native name: 椒江 (Chinese)

Location
- Country: China
- Region: Zhejiang Province

The Jiao River (Chinese: 椒江; pinyin: Jiāojiāng) is a river in Zhejiang Province, China. Its upper stretches are called Yong'an Brook (永安溪) and Ling River (灵江). It flows into the Taizhou Bay, Yueqing Bay and Sanmen Bay of the East China Sea at the Port of Taizhou, a natural seaport on the coast of the prefectural-level city of Taizhou.

This 198 kilometres (123 mi) long river drains 6,519 square kilometres (2,517 sq mi).
