= Dadanpatrabar Port =

Deep-sea port of West Bengal

- Interactive map of Dadanpatrabar Port
- Location within West Bengal
- Native name: দাদনপাত্রবাড় বন্দর

Location
- Country: India
- Location: Dadanpatrabar Port, Purba Medinipur, West Bengal
- Coordinates: 21°40′12″N 87°42′24″E

Details
- Owned by: Government of West Bengal
- Type of Harbor: Deep-sea port

Dadanpatrabar Port is a proposed greenfield deep-sea port in Dadanpatrabar, Purba Medinipur district, West Bengal.

Initially, the union and state governments will jointly start the project on 1,700 acres of land in Dadanpatrabar. Later, more land will be acquired for the project as per the requirement.

== Location and meteorology ==
Dadanpatrabar Port site is situated on the coast of Bay of Bengal at Dadanpatrabar, located in the Indian state of West Bengal.

Unconsolidated sedimentary deposits of Quaternary period are seen in this area. The area falls under the deltaic plain of Bengal, and the deltaic plain of Bengal is characterised by thick deposits of unconsolidated sediments. The port area falls under class III seismic zone, which indicating a moderate risk of earthquakes.

== Connectivity ==
The nearest national highway from the port is National Highway 116B, which is at a distance of 8 km. The national highway starts from National Highway 116 at Nandakumar and ends at Digha near Tajpur. There are plans to connect the port to the existing Tamluk–Digha branch line.
