= Ramayapatnam Port =

Deep-sea port in Andhra Pradesh, India

- Interactive map of Ramayapatnam Port
- Location in India Andhra Pradesh

Location
- Country: India
- Location: Ramayapatnam, Prakasam, Andhra Pradesh
- Coordinates: 15°01′09″N 80°03′09″E

Details
- Operated by: Andhra Pradesh Maritime Board
- Owned by: Andhra Pradesh Maritime Board
- Type of harbour: Deep-sea port
- Land area: 802.70 acres (3.2484 km^{2})
- No. of berths: 4
- Draft depth: 15.5 metres (51 ft)
- Length of approach channel: 11.83 kilometres (7.35 mi)

Ramayapatnam Port is a deep-sea port at Ramayapatnam in Prakasam district of Andhra Pradesh. The port is being constructed by the Ramayapatnam Port Development Corporation Limited under the Andhra Pradesh Maritime Board, an organization of the Government of Andhra Pradesh.

The port consists of an artificial harbour surrounded by Breakwaters. Cargo will be handled through container berths, coal berths and multi-purpose berths located within the harbour. It will have a maximum depth of 16 metres (52 ft) and will be able to accommodate panamax vessels. According to the Andhra Pradesh Maritime Board, the draft of the port will be around 15.5 metres (51 ft), which accommodate 85,000 deadweight tonnage vessels at the harbour's jetties.

== Location and meteorology ==
The Ramayapatnam Port is situated on the shore of the Bay of Bengal at 15.019167° north latitude and 80.052500° east longitude. It is located about 13 kilometres (8.1 mi) southeast of Ulavapadu and 80 kilometres (50 mi) south of Ongole. Distance from Krishnapatnam Port to Ramayapatnam port is 83 kilometres (52 mi), and is located north from Krishnapatnam. There are no protected areas—ecologically sensitive areas, marine national parks, wildlife sanctuaries, etc.—within a 10 kilometres (6.2 mi) radius of the port.

The Ramayapatnam region is characterized by a hot subtropical climate, with harsh summers and annually recurring monsoons. Ramayapatnam experiences seasonal temperature variation; the climate is hot and humid with seasonal rainfall varying between 18-40°C. April and May are the warmest months, while December and January are the coldest months. The average monthly temperature is above 30°C from April to July and the maximum monthly temperature is 42°C in May. August to March temperatures are below 30°C, and January and December are the lowest monthly temperatures of 20°C. The port receives most of its seasonal rainfall from the southwest monsoon from June to September and the northeast monsoon (October to December). The near shore is relatively steeper due to the effect of high waves during the monsoon season. Due to low pressure in the Bay of Bengal, cyclones with wind speeds above 60 km/h occur in the coastal area of Ramaypatnam, especially during May and September to November, but cyclones are more frequent in October.

The area is covered by coastal alluvium consisting of occasional layers of sand and clay. The upper layer consists of sand with fresh water aquifer at a depth of 6 metres (20 ft)to 7 metres (23 ft), and the next layer consists of silt and clay with saline aquifer. Hard rock schist lies at greater depth. The area near Tettu village west of the port area is covered by laterite followed by schist layers. The port falls under Class III seismic zone as per Seismic Zone Map of India IS: 1893 Part 1, 2002, which indicating a moderate risk of earthquakes. According to the bathymetric survey, the water depth is 20 meters at a distance of 13 kilometres (8.1 mi) from the shoreline.

== Port details ==
=== Harbour ===
The harbour of the Ramayapatnam deep sea port an artificial harbor, which is protected by breakwaters. The water depth of the harbour basin is 16 metres (52 ft), which will accommodate large ships. The approach channel forms a turning circle in the harbor with a depth of 15.2 metres (50 ft), which is used to change the direction of the vessel as required before berthing the vessel at the jetty.

=== Approach channel ===
Depth of water in the channel
Depth		Measure (meters)
Condition	Value	Measure (meters)
Natural depth	Range	5–16 metres (16–52 ft)
Natural depth	Dredged	16 metres (52 ft)
Tidal depth	Maximum	16.8–17 metres (55–56 ft)

The approach channel connect the 16 metres (52 ft) deep water body to the harbour, which is constructed by dredging the seabed at a depth of 5 m within 300 metres (980 ft) to 600 metres (2,000 ft) from the seashore, 10 m between 3 kilometres (1.9 mi) and 15 m between 10 kilometres (6.2 mi). An 11.83 kilometres (7.35 mi) long approach channel at open sea will be used for the movement of ships to the port's harbour. The approach channel has a depth of 16 metres (52 ft) and a minimum width of 200 metres (660 ft), allowing vessels with a draft of 15.5 m to arrive and depart the harbor without tidal assistance. However, the highest and lowest tides observed in the harbor area are 1.2 metres (3.9 ft) and 0.5 metres (1.6 ft) respectively.

== Connectivity ==
The nearest national highway from the port is National Highway 16, which is at a distance of 4.5 kilometres (2.8 mi). The National Highway provides road connectivity between Kolkata and Chennai, which is connected to the cities of Guntur, Vijayawada and Visakhapatnam in Andhra Pradesh. The port is connected to National Highway 16 through a 4-lane road, which is planned to be widened to 6 lanes later. The total length of this road is about 5.75 kilometres (3.57 mi).

The port is connected to the existing Howrah–Chennai main line near Tettu railway station. The railway is about 7.3 km long.

== Bibliography ==
- RITES (2019). Detailed Project Report (DPR) for Development of Ramayapatnam Port (Report). environmentclearance.nic.in.
- Chandramohan, Dr. P. (2021). Environmental Impact Assessment & Environmental Management Plan Report for Development of Greenfield Non-Major Port at Ramayapatnam in Prakasam District of Andhra Pradesh (PDF) (Report). Archived from the original (PDF) on 13 June 2024.
