= Yueqing Bay =

Bay in Zhejiang, China

- 乐清湾
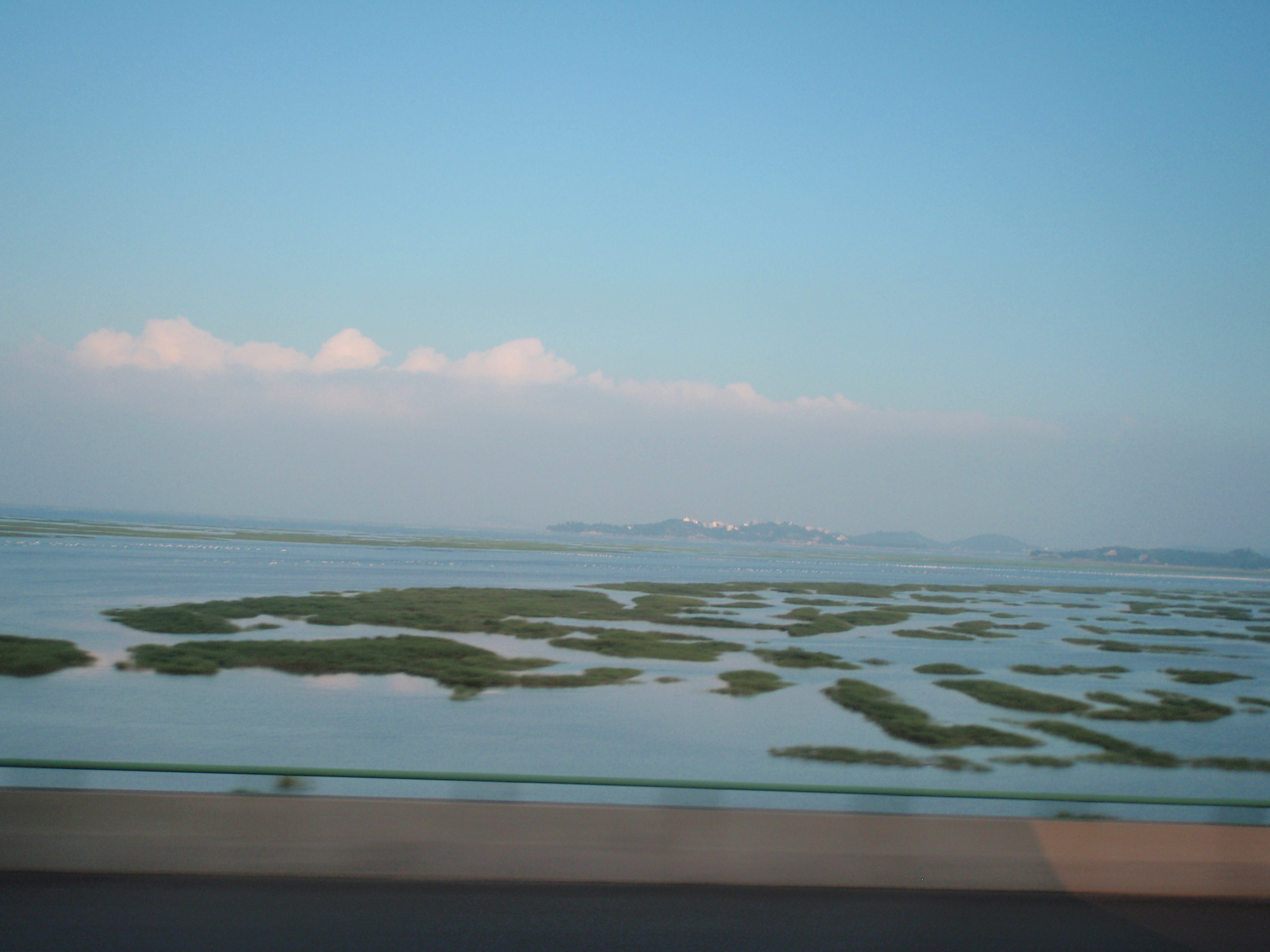
- Coastal tidal flats along the western shore of Yueqing Bay
- Interactive map of Yueqing Bay
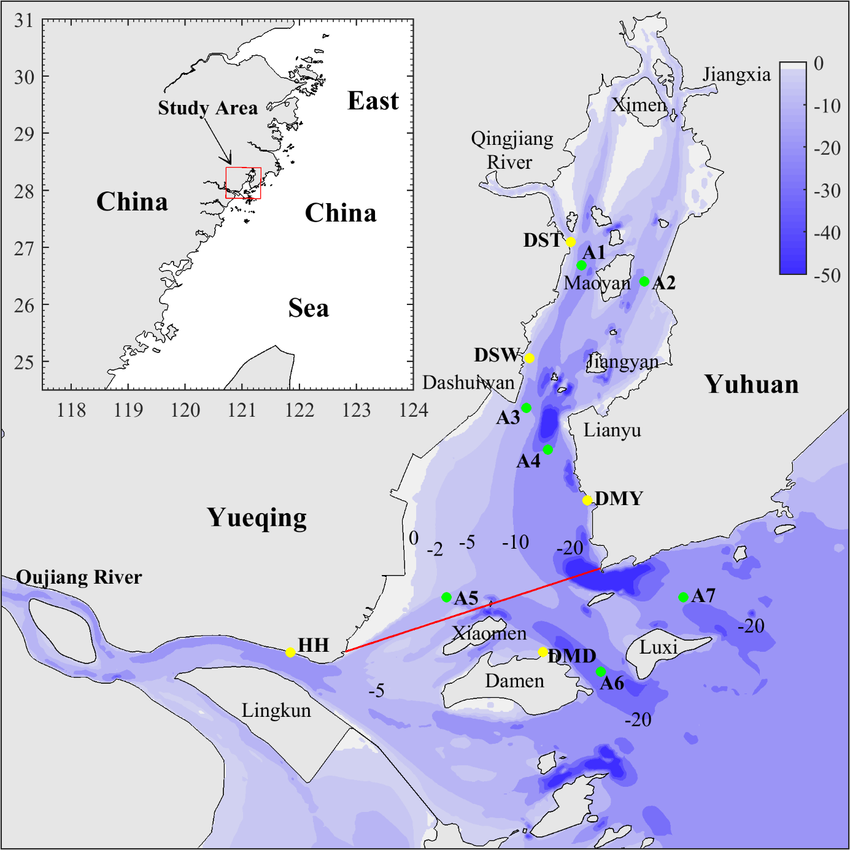
- Bathymetry of the Yueqing Bay and its environs
- Location: North of the estuary of the Ou River and along the northern margin of the Wenzhou Bay, bordering Yuhuan to the east and Yueqing to the west, with Wenling at its tip
- Coordinates: 28.1748963°N 121.1313986°E
- Type: Semi-enclosed bay
- Etymology: Yueqing City on its west coast
- Primary inflows: Qingjiang (Qing River), Baixi (Bai Creek), Shuizhangxi (Shuizhang Creek), Lingxi (Ling Creek), Jiangxia (Jiangxia Creek) and Dajingxi (Dajing Creek), etc.
- Catchment area: 1,470 km^{2} (570 sq mi)
- Basin countries: China
- Max. length: 47 km (29 mi)
- Max. width: 15 km (9.3 mi)
- Surface area: 469 km^{2} (181 sq mi)
- Average depth: 6.3 m (21 ft)
- Max. depth: Over 70 m (230 ft)
- Residence time: 49.5 days on average
- Shore length^{1}: 220 km (140 mi)
- Frozen: Never
- Islands: Ximen Island, Maoyan Island, Jiangyan Island, Dawu Island and Xiaowu Island, etc.
- ^{1} Shore length is not a well-defined measure.

Yueqing Bay
- Simplified Chinese: 乐清湾
- Traditional Chinese: 樂清灣
- Literal meaning: Yueqing Bay
Transcriptions
Standard Mandarin
- Hanyu Pinyin: Yuèqīng Wān

Yueqing Bay (Chinese: 乐清湾; pinyin: Yuèqīng Wān) is a semi-enclosed bay in southern Zhejiang of China. It lies north of the estuary of the Ou River and along the northern margin of the Wenzhou Bay, bordering Yuhuan to the east and Yueqing to the west, with Wenling at its tip. The mouth of the bay opens southwards and is fringed by the islands of Dongtou. The bay takes its name from Yueqing on its western shore.

Originally a tidal channel between Wenzhou Bay and Xuanmen Bay, Yueqing Bay gradually developed into a semi-enclosed harbour after the silting and closure of Xuanmen Harbour. The bay extends approximately 47 km (29 mi) from north to south and up to 15 km (9.3 mi) at its widest point from east to west, covering a sea area of about 469 km^{2} (181 sq mi), with a total coastline exceeding 220 km (140 mi).

== Geography ==
More than thirty rivers and creeks, including the Qingjiang (Qing River), Baixi (Bai Creek), Shuizhangxi (Shuizhang Creek), Lingxi (Ling Creek), Jiangxia (Jiangxia Creek) and Dajingxi (Dajing Creek), flow into the bay. Small alluvial or diluvial plains have generally developed at their estuaries. The total catchment area is approximately 1,470 km^{2} (570 sq mi), with a long-term average annual runoff of about 102,900,000 m^{3} (3.63×10^{9} cu ft).The intertidal zone is dominated by silty tidal flats, with mudflats accounting for roughly half of the bay's total area.

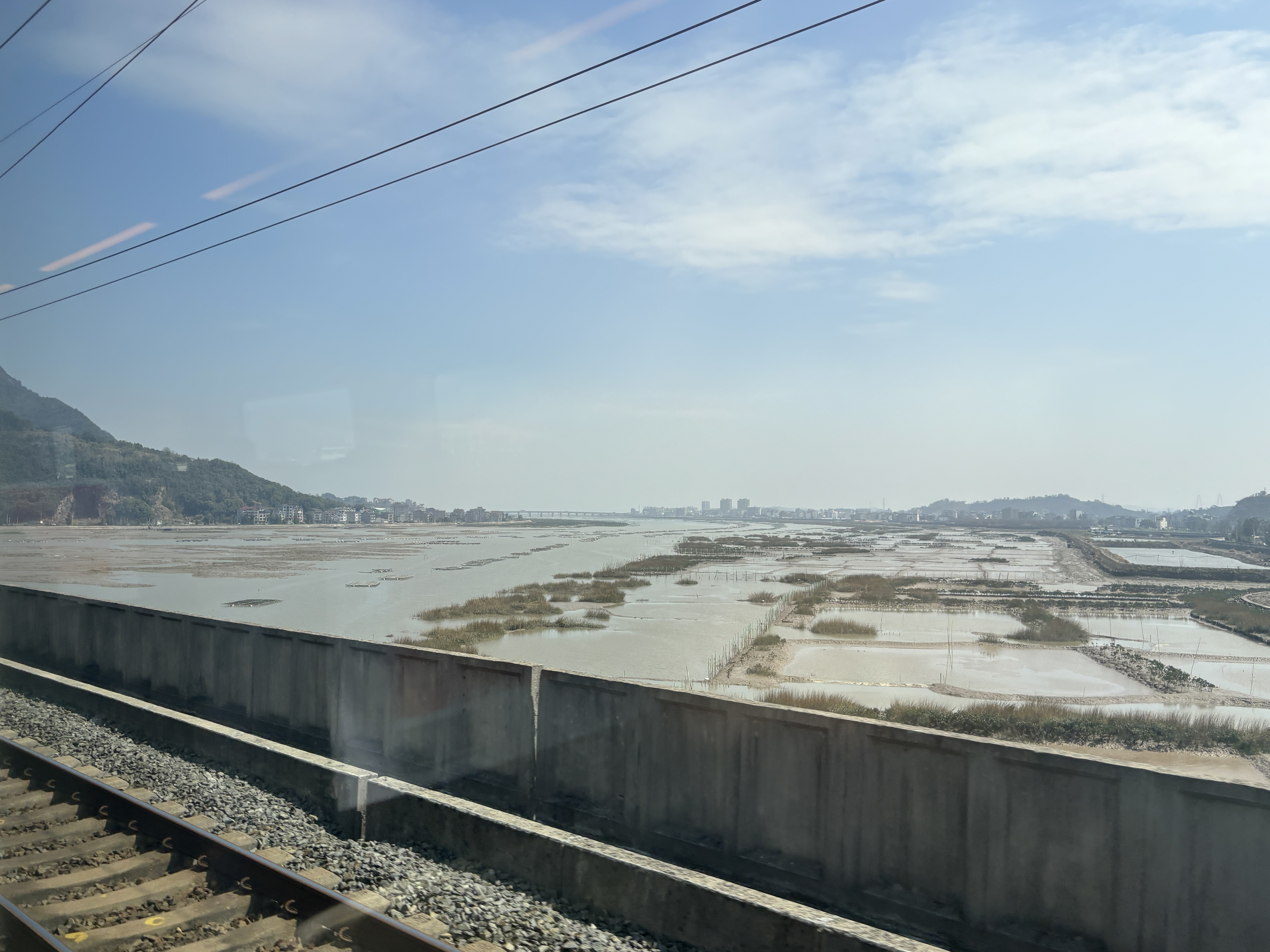
Estuary of the Dajing Creek

The bay contains about 30 islands and reefs with an area exceeding 1,000 m^{2} (11,000 sq ft), among which Ximen Island, Maoyan Island, Jiangyan Island, Dawu Island and Xiaowu Island are relatively important. In addition, there are 8 exposed reefs and 1 shoal. Most of these islands and reefs are remnants of the Yandang Mountains formed under marine transgression. Baisha Island, Ximen Island and Xiaohengchuang Island have permanent residents, while the others are largely uninhabited. Ximen Island, with an area of approximately 6.37 square kilometres (2.46 sq mi) and a highest elevation of 398.6 metres (1,308 ft), is the largest island under the administration of Yueqing.

Since 1990, the Yueqing Bay has been significantly affected by human activities. Between 1990 and 2017, driven by urban expansion, port and wharf construction, land reclamation, and aquaculture, the total length of the Yueqing Bay coastline decreased by approximately 5 kilometres (3.1 mi), during which natural shoreline was substantially reduced, while artificial shoreline increased markedly. After 2000, as readily exploitable nearshore resources became increasingly scarce, the expansion of reclamation shoreline gradually slowed. Meanwhile, sandy shorelines and silty muddy shorelines were extensively compressed due to aquaculture use and land reclamation.

== Climate ==
Yueqing Bay has a humid subtropical climate, resulting in a generally warm and humid climate with four distinct seasons. The annual mean temperature is approximately 17–18 °C (63–64 °F), and the average annual precipitation is about 1,700 mm (67 in). Major meteorological hazards include tropical cyclones, intense rainfall and flooding, storm surges, and drought, among which typhoons and storm surges pose the most significant threats to coastal areas along the bay. Seasonal variations in river runoff flowing into the bay are pronounced, leading to corresponding seasonal changes in the extent of estuarine tidal flats.

== Human activities ==
=== Governance ===
Yueqing Bay is one of the bay areas designated for development by the Zhejiang Provincial Government, with coordinated planning and construction undertaken jointly by Wenzhou and Taizhou. However, historical disputes between Yueqing and Yuhuan over the third-phase reclamation of Xuanmen and reclamation projects in Dongtou, together with wastewater discharge outlets established by Wenling in the upper reaches of the bay, have made interregional coordination relatively complex.

At present, the Yuhuan Maritime Safety Administration and the Yueqing Bay Maritime Safety Administration have signed a memorandum of cooperation and established a joint maritime coordination mechanism to ensure navigational safety in the bay. In addition, the two sides have promoted collaboration in infrastructure development, tourism, healthcare, and environmental protection around Yueqing Bay.

=== Salt production ===
Hot summers and abundant sunshine favour solar saltmaking, and salt pans have operated here for centuries. In Yueqing, saltworks such as Changlin and Tianfu were already well developed by the Southern Song period and the area remains part of the region's salt producing landscape today.

=== Fisheries ===
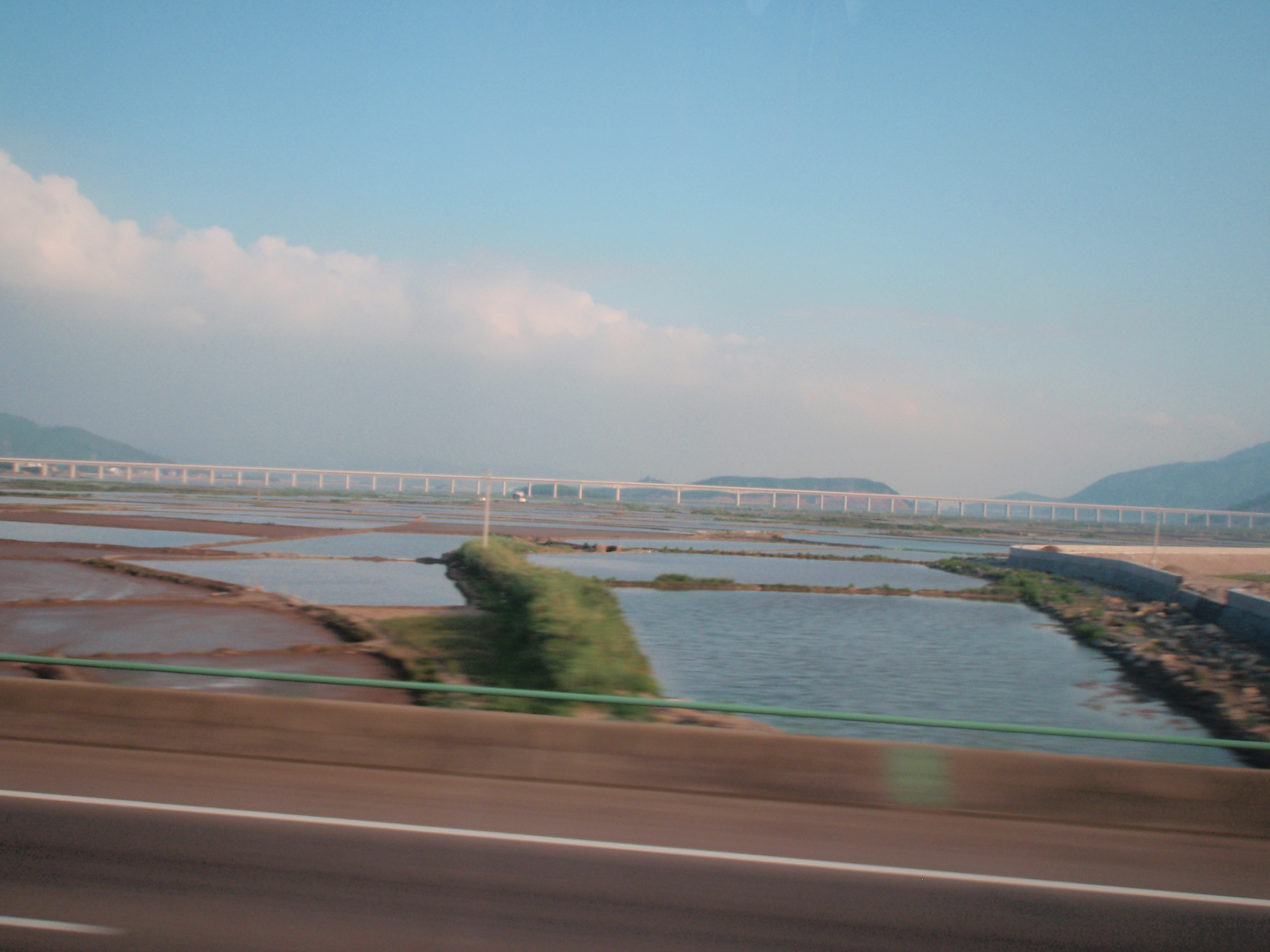
Forebays along the coastline

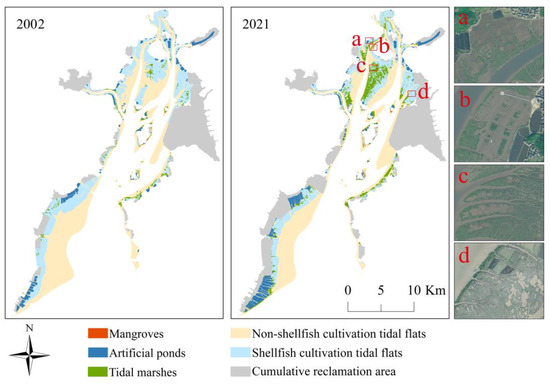
Distribution of shellfish cultivation, pond cultivation, and tidal marshes in 2003 and 2021

The bay supports a wide range of commercially valuable species, including around 106 fish species, about 58 shellfish species, and roughly 60 crustacean species. Exploitation has tended to follow a stepped nearshore pattern, from the shallow inshore waters (the forebay) to intertidal mudflats and, further landward, to enclosed ponds created by embankments. Shellfish farming on the tidal flats has a tradition of several centuries and functions as an important seed production base; seed output for razor clams (e.g., Sinonovacula constricta) and blood cockles is among the higher shares within Zhejiang Province.

=== Port facilities ===
The Damaiyu Port on the Yueqing Bay, together with the stretch from Shagangtou to Dongshantou, has relatively favourable bathymetric conditions. Water depths in the port area are about 9–30 m (30–98 ft), with a maximum of around 41 m (135 ft), providing a natural basis for developing deep water berths of multiple tonnage classes. Topographically, the bay is bordered to the north and west by the Yandang Mountains and sheltered to the east by the Yuhuan Island, making the inner bay comparatively protected with generally lower current speeds, and suitable for use as a typhoon shelter and anchorage for coastal and international shipping.

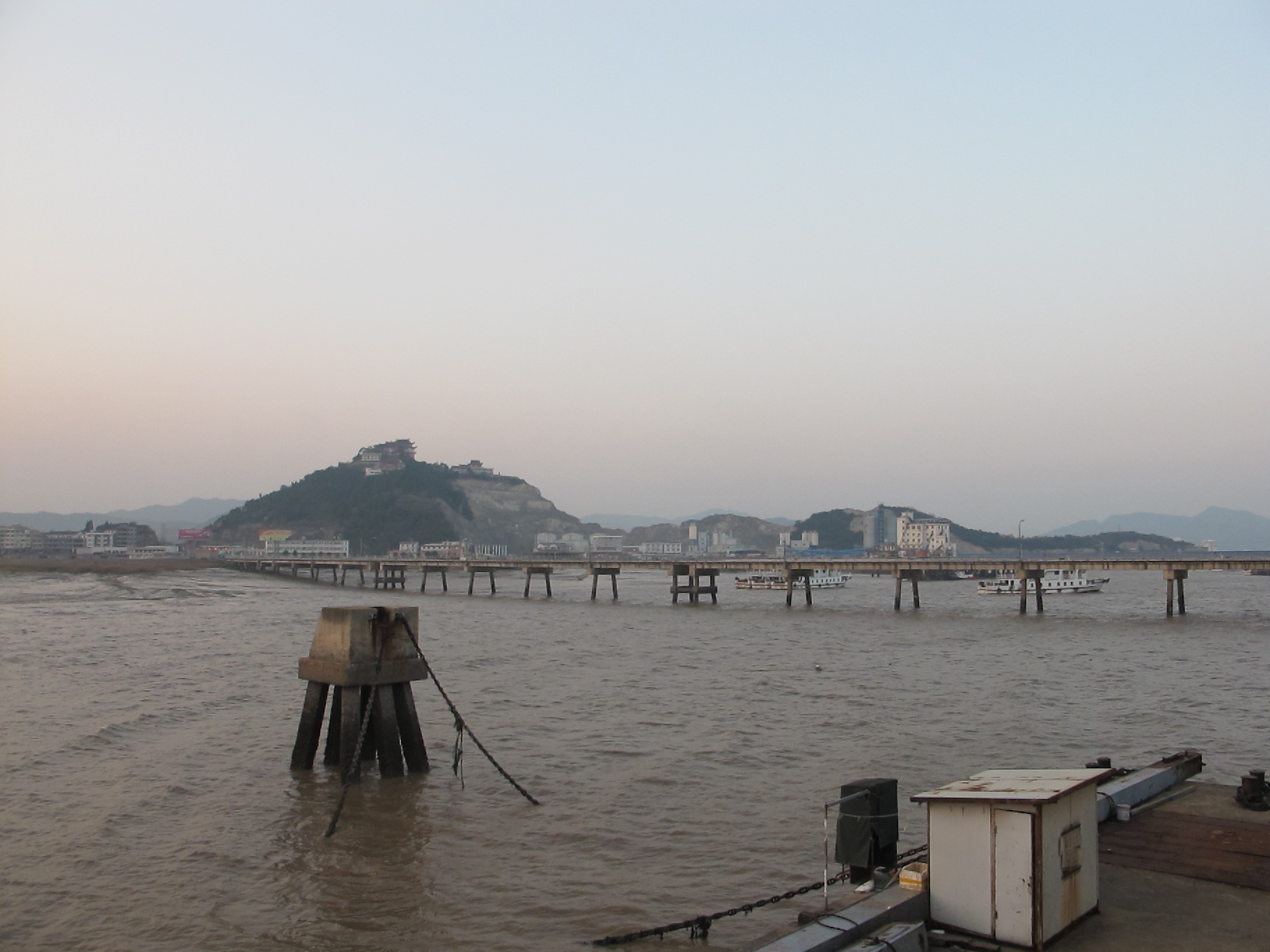
Nanyue Pier of Yueqing Bay Port

Phase I of Zone C of the Yueqing Bay Port Area involved a total investment of about CN¥ 2.889 billion. Construction started in December 2019, with plans including three 100,000 tonne general cargo berths and associated facilities, designed for an annual throughput capacity of 18.40 million tonnes. The Yueqing Bay Port adjacent economy development zone was approved as a provincial level development zone in Zhejiang in 2022, and was officially inaugurated in February 2023. In 2023, the main structure of the Wenzhou Bonded Logistics Centre was completed; the marine works for Berths 1 and 3 were finished; and Berth 2 was largely completed. That year, port cargo throughput reached 26.3322 million tonnes, and container handling totalled 85,590.5 TEU.

The approach channel is planned and maintained in parallel with port development. It links the Dayangyu Port Area of Taizhou Port with the Yueqing Bay Port Area of Wenzhou Port, with a total length of about 45.5 km (24.6 nmi). The channel is built to accommodate one way navigation by 100,000 tonne bulk carriers and two way navigation by 50,000 tonne container ships. It comprises an outer bay and an inner bay section, with design depths of approximately 17.2 m (56 ft) and 16.4 m (54 ft) respectively. Navigation is strongly influenced by tides, and large vessels often enter and leave on a tidal window. The channel also experiences periodic siltation, with mean monthly deposition of about 3.91 cm (1.54 in) in shallower open water sections and about 2.29 cm (0.90 in) in shallower constricted sections inside the bay; during the flood season, increased runoff can bring short term scouring, leading to localised shifts from deposition to erosion.

=== Industrial zones ===
Yueqing Bay Electric Power Technology Town is located within the Yueqing Economic and Technological Development Zone and covers a planned area of about 3.33 km^{2} (1.29 sq mi). It focuses primarily on high end equipment manufacturing in the power and electrical sector. In 2021 it was officially recognised by the Zhejiang provincial government, and in 2022 it was selected as a model case in the province's green and low carbon themed characteristic towns programme. The planned area extends from Weiyi Road in the north to Weishier Road and further to Weishiqi Road in the south, bounded by the Lehai reclamation area to the east and Jingqi Road to Jingjiu Road to the west. In 2022 the town completed fixed asset investment of CN¥ 638 million, of which 78.3% was directed towards its core industries.

As of 2023, 188 power related enterprises have been established and are in operation within the town. These include 6 listed companies, 3 recognised national hidden champion firms, 48 high tech enterprises and 92 industrial enterprises above designated size. Total industrial output has exceeded CN¥10 billion. The industrial chain is relatively complete, covering equipment manufacturing across power generation, transmission, transformation, distribution and utilisation, as well as core components and end products. The town has established five innovation and entrepreneurship platforms at provincial level or above, including two at national level and a national demonstration base for small and micro enterprise innovation. It also hosts 14 provincial level enterprise research institutes.

=== Tidal power ===
Yueqing Bay is strongly influenced by tidal processes and has a relatively large tidal range. The long term mean tidal range is about 4.5 m (15 ft), increasing from roughly 4.2 m (14 ft) at the bay mouth to about 5.2 m (17 ft) at the Jiangxia tide station near the head of the bay; the maximum tidal range can exceed 8.5 m (28 ft). Tidal waves propagate from the East China Sea into the bay. With the exception of Haishan and Jiangxia, which experience irregular semidiurnal tides, most waters within the bay are characterised by regular semidiurnal tides. The bay possesses considerable tidal energy resources and is considered suitable for tidal power development. Tidal power stations have been constructed at Jiangshan, Haishan and Jiangxia. Among them, the Jiangxia Pilot Tidal Power Plant, completed in 1980 and still in operation, is the largest tidal power station in China, with an installed capacity of up to 550,000 kW.

== Conservation ==
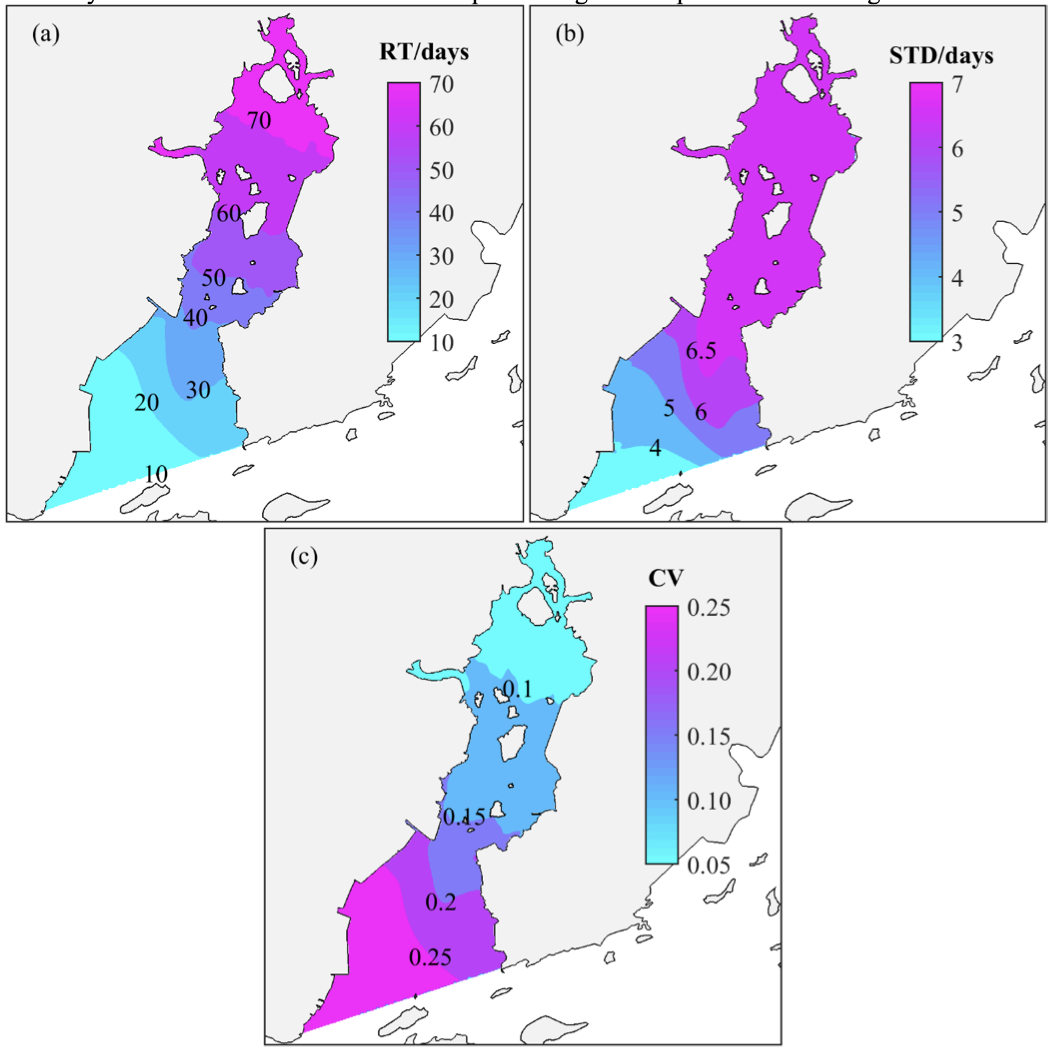
Horizontal distribution of (a) residence time, (b) standard deviation of residence time and (c) coefficient of variation in Yueqing Bay

Yueqing Bay has been identified by BirdLife International as an Important Bird Area and serves as a key habitat for many rare and endangered waterbirds during the wintering and breeding seasons. It also marks the northernmost limit of mangrove distribution in China. In 2005, the Chinese government established the Ximen Island National Marine Special Protected Area within the bay, the first national-level marine special protected area in the country.

As one of Zhejiang's principal zones for mariculture and port activity, the bay has experienced rapid industrialisation and urbanisation over recent decades, placing considerable pressure on its nearshore environment. The invasion of Spartina alterniflora, accelerated coastal development and intensified human activities have posed significant threats to local mangrove ecosystems and intertidal aquaculture. Shrinking water areas, high and poorly planned aquaculture density, and associated pollution risks have contributed to a continuing degradation of marine habitats.

Monitoring data from 2018 to 2019 indicate pronounced seasonal variation in nutrient levels. Nitrogen-dominated nutrients were highest in autumn and lowest in winter, while phosphorus concentrations were relatively elevated in autumn and lowest in summer. Nutrient concentrations were generally lower near the bay mouth and increased landward, particularly in the central and inner sections of the bay. Influencing factors include river-borne pollutants, domestic and industrial wastewater discharge, aquaculture activities and engineering works affecting water exchange. Phosphorus distribution is more complex, additionally influenced by sediment release processes and thermal discharges from power plants.

Long-term monitoring shows that before 2007, concentrations of several heavy metals rose markedly, with particularly sharp increases in mercury and copper. Between 2007 and 2021, environmental quality gradually improved following the implementation of coastal emission reduction policies and industrial regulation. However, copper has remained at relatively high pollution levels, cadmium contamination has intensified since 2007, and lead, zinc and chromium have generally remained at moderate levels. Arsenic and mercury exhibited an initial increase followed by partial improvement. Soils in highly disturbed areas near industrial, agricultural and residential land show significantly higher concentrations of cadmium, lead and mercury, while total carbon, organic carbon and readily oxidisable organic carbon contents are lower, suggesting that elevated heavy metal levels may weaken the carbon storage function of coastal wetland soils.

== See also ==
- Yueqing Bay Bridge
- Yueqingwan Railway
