= Keni Port =

- Interactive map of Keni Port
- Location in India Karnataka

Location
- Country: India
- Location: Keni, Uttara Kannada, Karnataka
- Coordinates: 14°42′N 74°15′E

Details
- Operated by: JSW Infrastructure
- Owned by: Karnataka Maritime Board
- Type of harbour: Deep-sea port
- Draft depth: 1st phase: 14.5 metres (48 ft); 2nd phase: 18 metres (59 ft)
- Navigational channel: 1st phase: 7.3 kilometres (4.5 mi); 2nd phase: 12 kilometres (7.5 mi)

Keni Port is a proposed deep-sea port at Keni village in Uttara Kannada district of Karnataka. (Note: In 2016, a techno-economic feasibility report was prepared by AECOM India Private Limited for Ministry of Shipping / Indian Ports Association to build a deep-sea port at Keni village, which was referred to as the Port at Belekeri in the report. However, the Karnataka Maritime Board established Keni port limits at location of the proposed Belekeri port in 2022.) The Karnataka Maritime Board signed an agreement with JSW Infrastructure in November 2023 to build the port. It is estimated that the port will be constructed at a cost of more than ₹4 thousand crore.

The port will consist of a harbor protected by Breakwaters, and deep channel. Cargo will be handled through port's container terminal, dry bulk cargo terminal and multipurpose cargo terminal. It will have a maximum depth of 20 meters and will be able to accommodate panamax and capesized vessels. A statement from the state government estimated that the port's net draft 18 meters, allowing Capesize vessels with 200,000 DWT (deadweight tonnage) to enter the proposed port.

== Port details ==
=== Harbour ===
The harbor of the Keni deep sea port will be an artificial harbor, which is protected by Breakwaters. The prescribed water depth for the harbor basin is 16.5 metres (54 ft) (1st phase), which will accommodate large ships; the maneuvering basin between the harbor basin and the approach channel will be 15.4 metres (51 ft) deep. The land required for the construction of infrastructure for cargo handling will be land reclaimed from the sea by filling with sediment.

=== Approach channel ===
An 7.3 kilometres (4.5 mi) (1st phase) long approach channel at open sea will be used for the movement of ships to the port's harbor. The approach channel has a depth of 16.1 metres (53 ft) and a minimum width of 150 metres (490 ft), allowing vessels with a draft of 14.5 metres (48 ft) to arrive and depart the harbor.

== Connectivity ==
The location of the port is well connected to the hinterland through National and State Highways. The nearest national highway from the port is National Highway 66, which is at a distance of 5 kilometres (3.1 mi).

There are plans to connect the port to the existing Konkan railway line. Ankola railway station is the nearest railway station from the port, at a distance of 8.2 kilometres (5.1 mi).

== Bibliography ==
- AECOM (2016). Techno-Economic Feasibility Report for Development of Port at Belekeri (PDF) (Report). sagarmala.gov.in.
