= Port of Maoming =

Coordinates: 21°38′33″N 111°04′21″E

Port of Maoming 茂名港
- Interactive map of Port of Maoming 茂名港

Location
- Country: People's Republic of China
- Location: Maoming, Maoming Prefecture, Guangdong Province,

Details
- Opened: 1998
- Operated by: Maoming Port Group Corporation, Ltd.
- Owned by: People's Republic of China
- Type of harbour: Natural Coastal Deep-water Port

Statistics
- Website; Website of the Port of Maoming

The Port of Maoming is a natural coastal seaport located on Maoming, Guangdong. It opens to the South China Sea.

In 2012, the port handled 23.9 million tonnes of total cargo and 83,543 TEU of containers.

== Layout and Facilities ==
Shuidong Port Area (水东港区) is the original port area, set alongside the mouth of the Maoming lagoon. As of 2012, it had 2 liquid chemical berths of 30,000DWT, 2 general cargo berths of 10,000DWT and 9 multipurpose berths. The channel is 15m deep.

Bohe New Port Area (博贺新港区)is located on the Liantou Peninsula, to the southeast of the Shuidong area. Since 1994 it has operated a single buoy mooring for 300000DWT VLCC 850,000m3 tank storage. 10Mt annual capacity. Bohe fishing port, with 800m wharf is across the bay. Future plans are for an extensive artificial deep-water port built on reclaimed land on the Peninsula, for a total of 33 berths, of which 2 coal berths of 150,000DWT and 1 of 100,000DWT; 2 ore berths of 200,000DWT, 3 bulk cargo berths of 30,000DWT; 7 general cargo berths of 70,000DWT, 2 container berts of 100,000DWT, 12 liquid chemical berths of 50,000-100,000DWT, 2 LNG berths and 1 300,000DWT oil berth.

Jida Port Area (吉达港区) is a planned development further east of the Bohe New Port, intended to support the planned harbor-front industrial development area. It is planned to have 47 deep-water berths. of which 6 100000DWT container berths.
