= Port of Beibu Gulf =

Port of Beibu Gulf 北部湾港
- Location in China

Location
- Country: People's Republic of China
- Location: Fangchenggang-Qinzhou-Beihai, Guangxi
- Coordinates: 21°42′06″N 108°36′47″E

Details
- Operated by: Guangxi Beibu Bay International Port Group
- Type of harbour: coastal natural deep-water & offshore terminal

Statistics
- Annual cargo tonnage: 4.63 million teu (2021)
- Website; Beibu Gulf Port Group

Port of Beibu Gulf

Chinese name
- Simplified Chinese: 北部湾港
- Traditional Chinese: 北部灣港
Transcriptions
Standard Mandarin
- Hanyu Pinyin: Běibùwān Gǎng
Yue: Cantonese
- Jyutping: Bak1 bu4 waan1 gong2 (Qinzhou accent)

Vietnamese name
- Vietnamese alphabet: Cảng Vịnh Bắc Bộ
- Chữ Nôm: 港泳北部

Port of Beibu Gulf (CNQZH, from Port of Qinzhou) is a port located in the Gulf of Tonkin (also known as Beibu Gulf), constituted by Port of Fangcheng, the Port of Qinzhou (also Qinzhou bonded logistics park) and the Port of Beihai from west to east.

The port mainly imports crude oil, vegetable oils, bitumen, bulk ore, etc. and exports the corresponding products. With its growth over the past five years, the port (represented by Qinzhou) was named one of the top 100 ports in the world by Lloyd's List for 2022.

== Infrastructure ==
- Port of Fangcheng: three 200,000-ton berths, eight 100,000~200,000 ton berths among 44 berths in total.
- Port of Qinzhou: one berth for 300,000-ton crude oil vessels, six berths for 100,000-ton container vessels, four 100,000-ton general berths, one 70,000-ton roll-on/roll-off berth among 22 berths in total.
- Port of Beihai: six 150,000-ton berths among 11 berths in total.
