= Port of Taizhou =

Coordinates: 28°41′08″N 121°27′01″E

Port of Taizhou 台州港
- Interactive map of Port of Taizhou 台州港

Location
- Country: People's Republic of China
- Location: Taizhou, Zhejiang Province

Details
- Owned by: People's Republic of China
- Type of harbour: Natural Estuary Seaport

Statistics
- Annual cargo tonnage: 56,280,000 metric tons (2013)
- Annual container volume: 166,571 TEU (2013)
- Website; Port of Taizhou website

The Port of Taizhou is a natural seaport on the coast of the prefectural-level city of Taizhou, Zhejiang Province, People's Republic of China. The Port is centered at the mouth of the Jiaojiang River, with port areas opening to the Taizhou Bay, Yueqing Bay and Sanmen Bay of the East China Sea. It is considered as the southernmost of the ports of the Yangtze Delta economic area. In 2013 it reached a throughput of 56.28 million metric tons, an increase of 5.0% over 2012, and a container throughput of 166,571 TEUs, an increase of 10.4%.

== Layout ==
The Port of Taizhou is scattered all over the Taizhou Prefecture's 1,544 km of shoreline. It has six main port areas:

- Haimen Port Area (Chinese: 海门港区) is the central port area and its main administrative and communication center. Channel is 2 m deep, allowing for 5,000 DWT vessels and heavy barges at high tide. Haimen Port Area focuses on general cargo and passenger services.
- Damaiyu Port Area (大麦屿港区) is located on the east coast of Yuhuan Peninsula, in Damaiyu, to the south of Taizhou city. The Lanmensha channel leading to it is 11 m deep, sufficient to handle 30,000 DWT vessels, up to 50,000 DWT vessels at high tide. The port basin is 13 m deep, low silt and the anchorage is well protected from wind, a useful feature in typhoon country. As of 2012, the port area had 14 berths, including one berth of 50,000 DWT, 2 berths of 30,000 DWT capacity, 1 Ro-ro berth 3,000 DWT, a passenger wharf of 3000 DWT and a 1000 DWT LNG transfer terminal. The planned shoreline extends 29.85 km.
- The Jiantiao Port Area (健跳港区) is located to the north of the prefecture. It includes the Niushan and Yangshi deep-water harbors wharves, with water depths of 10 m. As of 2012, it had 10 wharves with 615 m of quayside, including one multipurpose wharf 5000 DWT, 2 wharves of 1000 DWT. It is also the site of an under-construction nuclear power station.
- The Linhai (Toumen) Port Area (临海（头门）港区), currently under construction, is located outside the estuary of the Jiaojiang, on reclaimed land around Toumen Island, connected to the mainland by a 12 km long passageway. The south shore of the 4.3 km, water depth of 9 m will have multipurpose, petrochemical and coal berths. The port area will have 47 deep-water berths. The north shore will become and industrial port and tourism and leisure center.
- The Wenling Port Area (温岭港区) as of 2012 had 38 berths, of which 3 1,000 DWT and 5 2,000 DWT oil berths. It also hosts the Longmen shipyard. The planned Wenling (Longmen) Port Area will cover 36.7 km of coastline. It is planned to be mostly a supply port for the industrial area, and a shipbuilding area.
- The Huangyan Port Area (黄岩港区) is located on the south shore of the Jiaojiang River, 1.87 km of quayside. Channel depth is 3–8 m. As of 2012 it had 7 wharves of 500-1000 DWT, and 2 shipyards. Five bulk cargo berths of 1000-2000 DWT are planned, and one berth for dangerous chemicals.
