= Port of Huludao =

Coordinates: 40°42′55″N 121°01′20″E

Port of Huludao 葫芦岛港
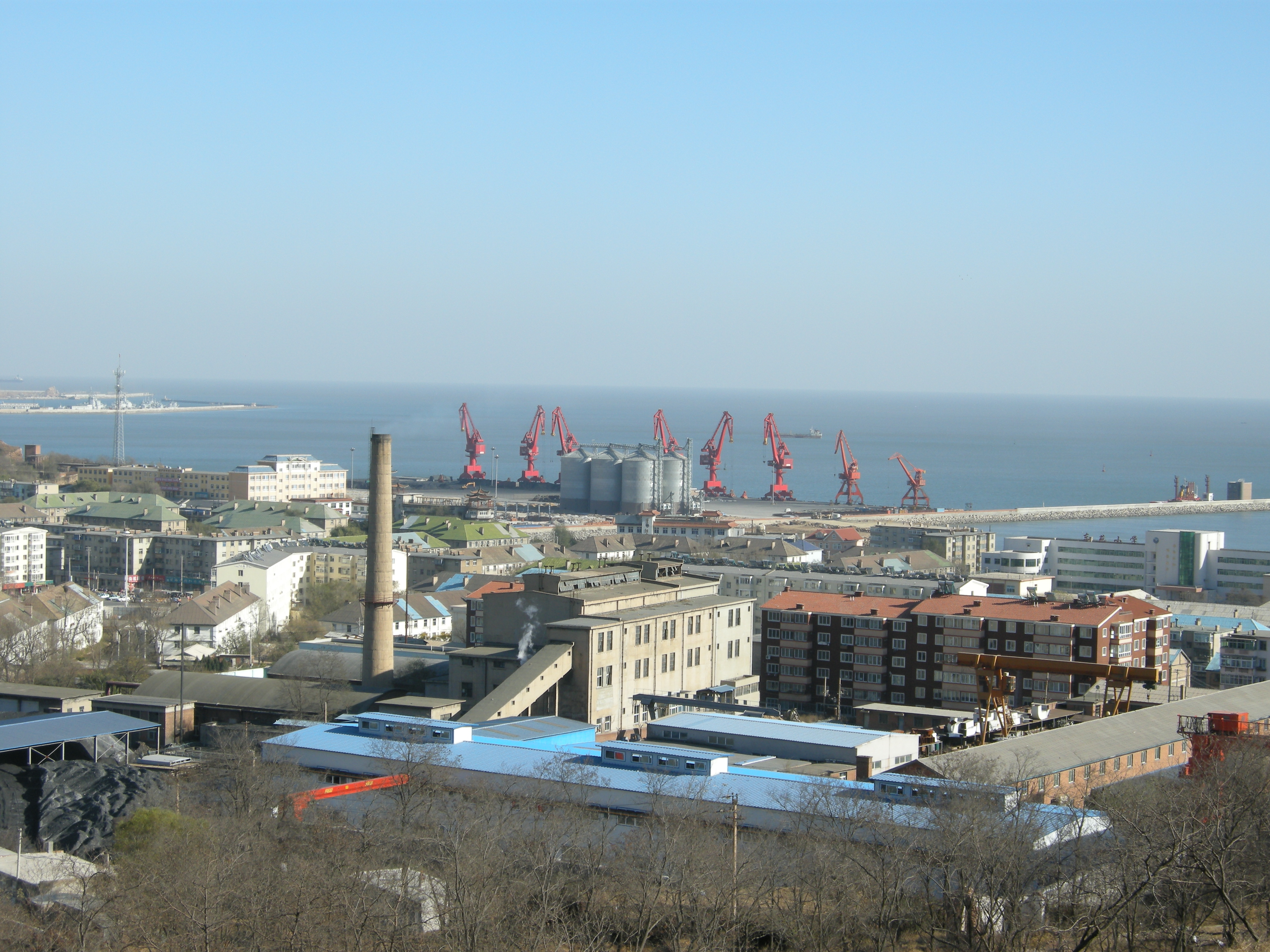
- Interactive map of Port of Huludao 葫芦岛港

Location
- Country: People's Republic of China
- Location: Huludao, Liaoning Province

Details
- Opened: 1908
- Owned by: People's Republic of China
- Type of harbour: Artificial Deep-water Seaport

The Port of Huludao is an artificial deep-water international seaport on the coast of Huludao, Liaoning, People's Republic of China, on the Liaodong Bay. It is one of several smaller ports being rapidly expanded in Liaoning Province in order to service the Northeast.

== Setting ==
Huludao Port opens to the middle section of Liaodong Bay. The port location was originally selected by British engineers hired by the Qing government, who considered that the shelter provided by the nearby mountains gave it an advantage over existing ports and alternative sites alike.

== History ==
The Port of Huludao was founded in 1908 by the then Qing governor Xu Shichang as a way to provide an alternative to the overloaded Qinghuangdao and Yingkou ports. Construction work started in 1910, only to stop abruptly with the outbreak of the 1911 Revolution. In 1930, Manchuria's warlord Zhang Xueliang once more started work, only to be thwarted again by the Mukden Incident. It was only during Japanese occupation that the port was completed to an annual capacity of 1 million tons.

After the war, the Port was mostly used as a naval base by the PLAN. It was only in 1984 that it started by shared for civilian use again, and in 1997 that it was fully reopened for internal trade. It was only in 2007 that it was reopened for foreign trade. Current plans hope to make the port into a 100 million ton throughput port by 2016.

== Layout ==
Huludao Port operates in four port areas. The main area is the Liutaogou Port Area (柳条沟港区), with 4 berths being expanded to 7. The North Port Area, opening to the Longwan Bay and the Xincheng Port Area to the southwest of the city are intended as general cargo ports. The under construction Suizhong Port Area (绥中港区) will be a large-scale coal terminal with 1 50,000DWT berth, 1 70,000DWT berth and 2 100,000DWT berths and a capacity for 50 million tons/year. The wharf length will be 1130m, and fairway depth of -16.4m.

The Bohai Shipyard (渤海造船厂) is located to the east of the new port, on the site of the original port.
