= Mulapeta Port =

Deep-sea port in Andhra Pradesh, India

- Interactive map of Mulapeta Port
- Location within Andhra Pradesh

Location
- Country: India
- Location: Mulapeta, Srikakulam, Andhra Pradesh
- Coordinates: 18°35′N 84°26′E

Details
- Operated by: Andhra Pradesh Maritime Board
- Owned by: Andhra Pradesh Maritime Board
- Type of Harbor: Deep-sea port
- Land area: 1,010 acres (4.1 km^{2})
- No. of berths: 4
- Draft depth: 16 metres (52 ft)
- Length of approach channel: 2.2 kilometres (1.4 mi)

Mulapeta Port is an under-construction deep sea port located at Mulapeta in Srikakulam district of Andhra Pradesh, India. The port is being constructed under the Andhra Pradesh Maritime Board, an organization of the Government of Andhra Pradesh. It is estimated that the construction cost of the port will more than ₹43 billion.

The port consist of an artificial harbour surrounded by breakwaters. Cargo will be handled through container berths, coal berths and multipurpose cargo berths located within the harbour. It will have a depth of 18 m (59 ft) and will be able to accommodate panamax and capsize vessels. According to a data from the Andhra Pradesh Maritime Board, the draft of the port will be around 16 m (52 ft), which accommodate 120,000 deadweight tonnage vessels at the harbour's jetties.

== History ==
The state of Andhra Pradesh has an approximately 975 km (606 mi) long coastline, the second longest among Indian states and union territories in India. The long coastline enables the state to monetize marine activities on a large scale. Andhra Pradesh is one of the premier states in India to have large-scale port infrastructure, and currently has fifteen non-major ports and one major port (Vishakhapatnam). The Andhra Pradesh Maritime Board Act came into effect from 16 December 2016; importance and benefits of adapting PPP models in modernization of state ports and their management are acknowledged. As part of its efforts to develop port infrastructure, the Andhra Pradesh Maritime Board (APMB) proposed the development of a greenfield port at Bhavnapadu (now Mulapeta) in Srikakulam district of Andhra Pradesh. The port limits were fixed in 1979, considering the current requirements and phased development, the Director of APMB requested the Government of Andhra Pradesh to increase the port limits.

The foundation stone of Mulapeta port in Srikakulam district was laid on 19 April 2023.

== Port infrastructure ==
=== Harbour ===
The Mulapeta Port is located within an artificial harbour, which is protected by breakwaters. The maneuvering basin or turning circle, located in the middle of the harbour, is 18.40 metres (60.4 ft) deep (below CD). The harbour has sufficient draft to accommodate Cape-sized vessels, up to about 120,000 DWT vessels.

The harbour is protected by two breakwaters—the South Breakwater, 2,855 metres (9,367 ft) long, and the North Breakwater, 580 metres (1,900 ft) long. For the north breakwater, the present bed level varies steeply along the alignment of the breakwater and ended up at a depth of 6 metres (20 ft) CD. In case of south breakwater, major portion is stretched diagonal to contour line and is located at a deeper depth around 9 metres (30 ft) to 12 metres (39 ft) CD contour line.

=== Approach channel ===
Water depth
Depth		Channel and harbour basin		
Depth		Approach Channel	Turning Circle	Berths
Natural	Seabed (below CD)	7–19.20 metres (23.0–63.0 ft)		2–10 metres (6.6–32.8 ft)
Natural	Dredged	19.20 metres (63.0 ft)	18.40 metres (60.4 ft)	15.5–17.60 metres (50.9–57.7 ft)

An 2.2 kilometres (1.4 mi) long approach channel at open sea will be used for the movement of ships to the port's harbour. The approach channel has a depth of 19.20 metres (63.0 ft) below chart datum and 20.2 metres (66 ft) below Sea level (MSL), and a minimum width of 225 metres (738 ft), allowing vessels with a draft of 16 metres (52 ft) to arrive and depart the harbour without tidal assistance.

== Bibliography ==
- Rao Kollu, Upendar (2022). Development of Greenfield Bhavanapadu Port, Dist. Srikakulam, Andhra Pradesh - Draft EIA Report (PDF) (Report). Voyants Solutions Private Limited.
- Solutions, Voyants (2021). PRELIMINARY SOCIAL IMPACT ASSESSMENT (SIA) REPORT (PDF) (Report).
