= Port of Zhenjiang =

Coordinates: 32°13′00″N 119°26′30″E

Port of Zhengjiang 镇江港
- Interactive map of Port of Zhengjiang 镇江港

Location
- Country: People's Republic of China
- Location: Zhenjiang, Jiangsu Province

Details
- Owned by: People's Republic of China
- Type of harbour: Natural Inland River Port
- No. of wharfs: 23

Statistics
- Annual cargo tonnage: 140.9 Mt (2013)
- Annual container volume: 384,000 TEU （2013）
- Website; Port of Zhenjiang

The Port of Zhenjiang is a natural inland river port located on Zhengjiang Prefectural Level city, Jiangsu, People's Republic of China. It is one of the succession of large shipping hubs lining the estuary and lower course of the Yangtze. The Port had a throughput of 140,984,000 tonnes of total cargo in 2013, an increase of 4.7%.

== Setting ==
Port of Zhenjiang extends on the South Bank of the Yangtze River between Nanjing and Changzhou. The river channel depth averages 11 m, capable of handling ships of up to 50,000 DWT year-round. The Grand Canal's Jiangnan section enters the Yangtze at Zhenjiang.

== History ==
There has been a major port at the location at least since late Han dynasty days. As the port straddled the confluence of the Grand Canal and the Yangtze river, it was a major hub for most Imperial times, its prosperity oscillating with the degree of repair of the Canal.

Chingkiang was one of the ports opened to foreign trade in 1858 by the Tianjin Treaties

== Layout ==
The Port of Zhenjiang extends over 33.8 km of shoreline, and it is divided into seven main port areas:

- Gaozi Port Area (高资港区): On the north shore of the Yangtze.
- Longmen Port Area (龙门港区):
- Zhenjiang Port Area (镇江港区): the old port area, has a channel depth of 4m. It is currently being discontinued and re-purposed.
- Jianbi Port Area (谏壁港区): includes the confluence of the Grand Canal.
- Dagang Port Area (大港港区): It is the main port area, currently with 8 berths of 25,000 DWT, 2 of 5,000 DWT, 1 of 2,000 DWT and 11 barge berths of 100 DWT. The Dagang Port Area Phase III, currently under construction, has 1 container berth of 50,000 DWT, 1 multiple use berth of 30,000 DWT, 1 general cargo berth of 50,000 DWT, 1 bulk cargo berth of 70,000 DWT, 2 berths for 5,000 DWT large Yangtze barges and a river basin for 12 500 DWT barges.
- Gaoqiao Port Area (高桥港区):
- Yangzhong Port Area (扬中港区): Mostly in development

== Administration ==
The Zhenjiang Port Group Co Ltd (镇江港务集团有限公司) was created in 2005 from the merger of the Zhenjiang City Port Management Bureau (镇江市港务管理局) and the Zhenjiang Port Limited Company (镇江港口有限责任公司).

== Operations ==
=== Workboats ===
As of 2012,
