= Macun Port =

Coordinates: 19.954°N 110.023°E

Macun Port 马村港
- Click on the map for a fullscreen view

Location
- Country: China
- Location: Haikou

Details
- Owned by: Hainan Harbor & Shipping Holding Co., Ltd. (state-owned stock holding enterprise)

Macun Port (simplified Chinese: 马村港; traditional Chinese: 馬村港; pinyin: Mǎcūn Gǎng) is a seaport in Hainan, China.
