= Feiyun River =

River in Zhejiang, China

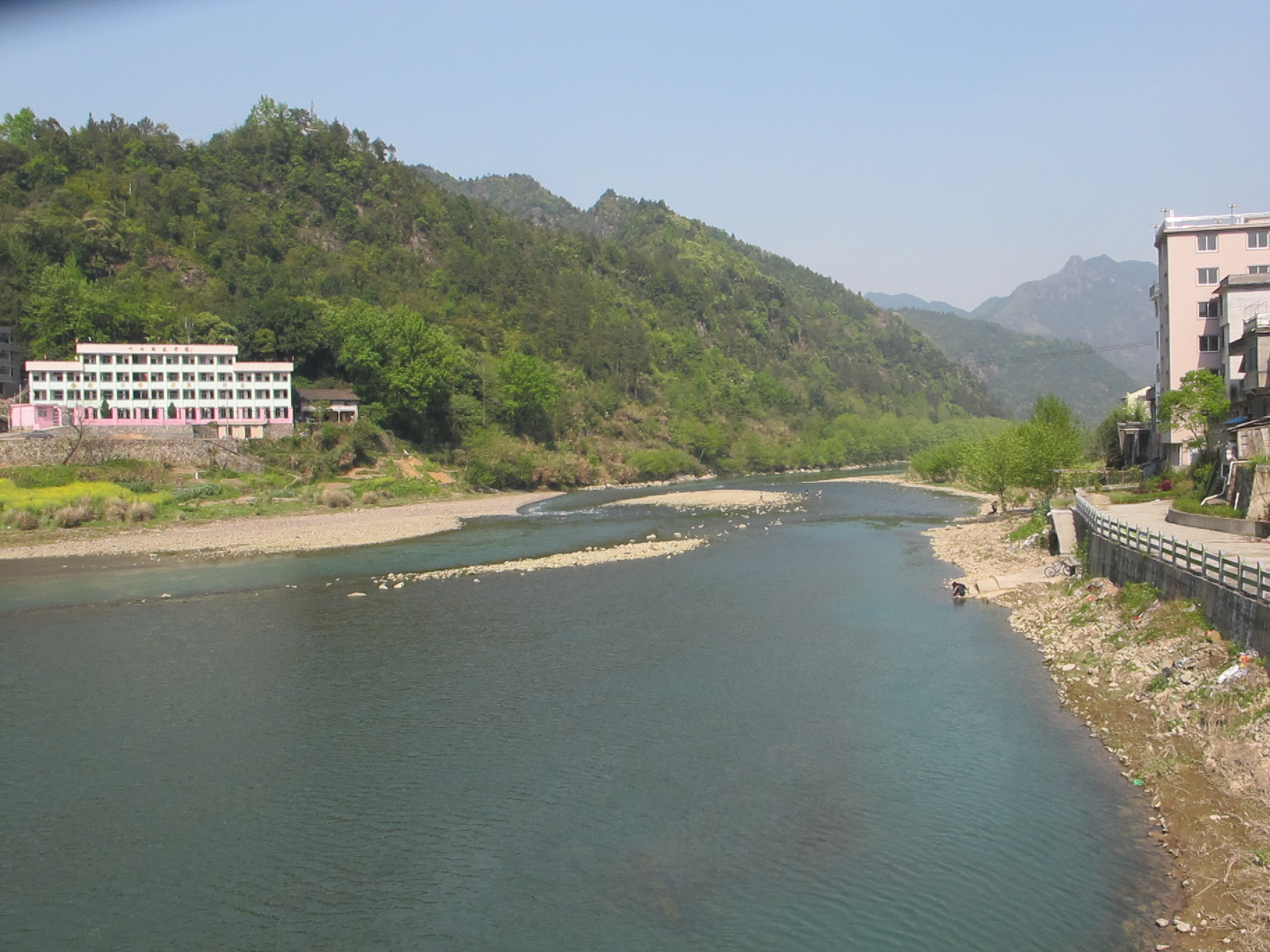
Looking at the Feiyun River on the Qiaokou Township Bridge

Feiyun River (Chinese: 飞云江) is the third longest river in Zhejiang, China. It has a total length of about 193 kilometres (120 mi), and a basin area of 3,719 square kilometres (1,436 sq mi). It has an average annual flow of 144 cubic meters (188 cu yd) per second.
