= Ikot Akpatek =

Village in Nigeria

Ikot Akpartek is a village in Akwa Ibom state in Nigeria. A coastal location, it has been proposed as a location to build a Panamax port.

In the past it has been at the center of controversies as the village council has tried to take over some of the historical lands held by some women in the village. It is also the headquarters location of a stake of the Church of Jesus Christ of Latter-day Saints. It is also has some Pentecostal churches. It is the location of a congregation of the Church of the Nazarene.

Recently, a market with 202 open stalls was commissioned by governor Udom Emmanuel at the urging of his wife.

During the period of British rule over Nigeria, Keith Arrowsmith, a local level British administrator, attempted to get locals to construct a road from Ikot Akpatek to Ikwe and Odio to improve accessibility to the latter two communities. This route is being reinforced by the Udom Emmanuel administration with the construction of a road connecting Ndon Eyo to Odio going through Ikot Akpatek.
