= Machilipatnam Port =

Proposed port in Andhra Pradesh, India

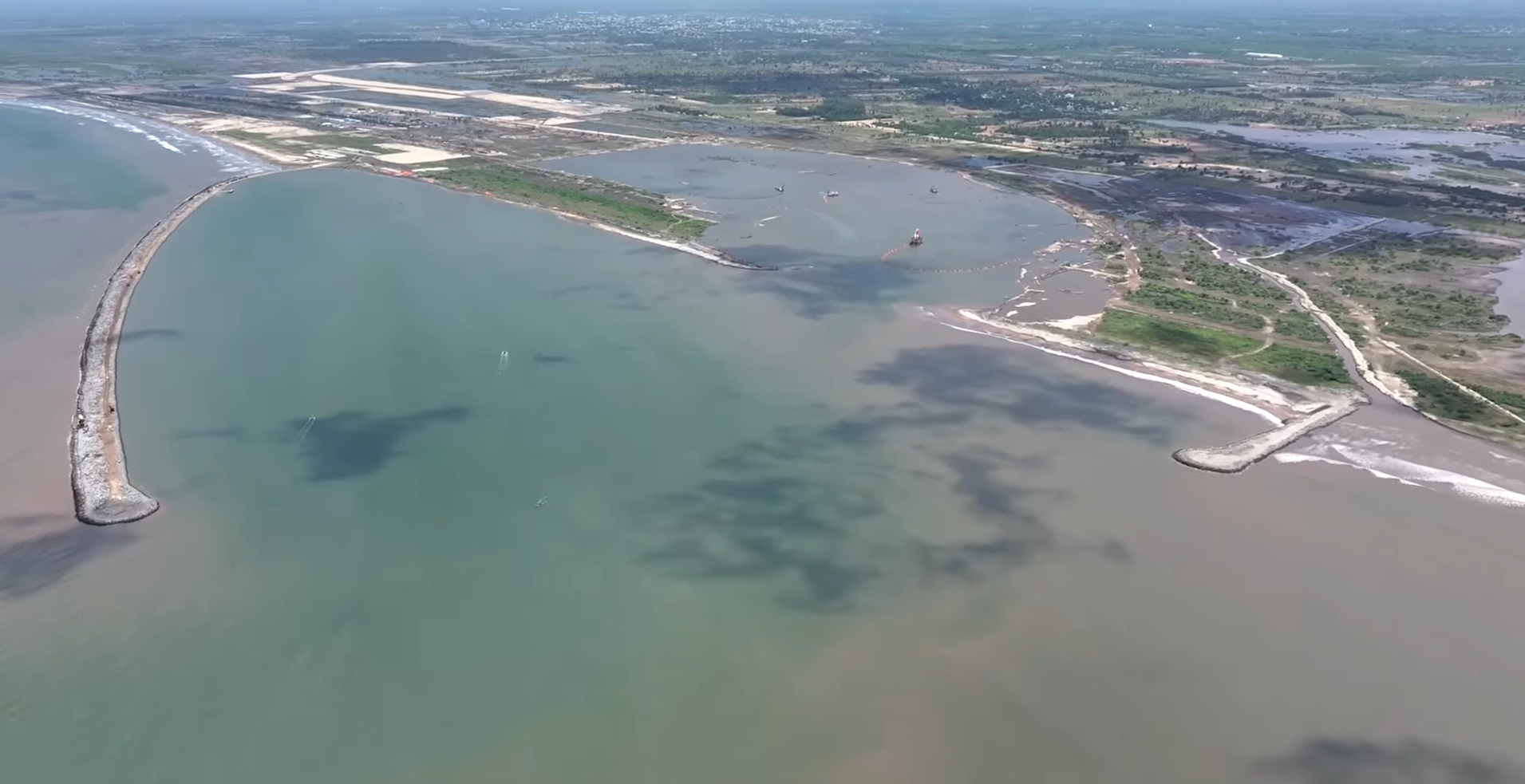
- Aerial view of the port under construction in August 2024.
- Interactive map of Machilipatnam Port
- Location in Andhra Pradesh, India Machilipatnam Port (India)

Location
- Country: India
- Location: Machilipatnam, Krishna district, Andhra Pradesh
- Coordinates: 16.2254261°N 81.2268909°E

Details
- Operated by: A.P Ports
- Owned by: A.P Government
- Land area: 5,000 acres
- No. of berths: 3 general cargo and 1 OSV berth (proposed)
- Employees: Nearly 5,000 direct employability and nearly 15,000 indirect employability

Statistics
- Annual revenue: ₹10,000 crores
- Net income: ₹50,000 crores after 2 years
- Website https://ports.ap.gov.in/#/machilipatnam-port

Machilipatnam Port is a greenfield deep sea port which lies midway on the east coast of India. It is on the coast of Bay of Bengal. It is located in Machilipatnam, Krishna district in the Indian state of Andhra Pradesh.

== History ==
The port was originally expected to begin its operations by 2021. Navayuga Engineering Company Limited bagged the project to develop the port on a build-own-operate-transfer basis.

There is a proposal to develop a mega thermal power plant near Machilipatnam during 11th Five Year Plan. It is proposed to construct of 2 Nos. General cargo berth and 1 OSV berth in Phase 1 Depth of the Channel: 12.80 Mt with ship handled capacity is 65000 DWT and port anticipated handling capacity.

The construction of the port, with an initial cargo capacity of 35 million tonnes (35 MMTPA), through four berths-three general cargo berths and one coal terminal. In the future, the capacity of the four-berth deep water port will be increased to 116 million tonnes (116 MMTPA) as the cargo traffic increases gradually. The port is scheduled to be completed in two years.

The work has been awarded to Megha Engineering and Infrastructure Ltd (MEIL) and the construction is currently under-progress.

== Gallery ==
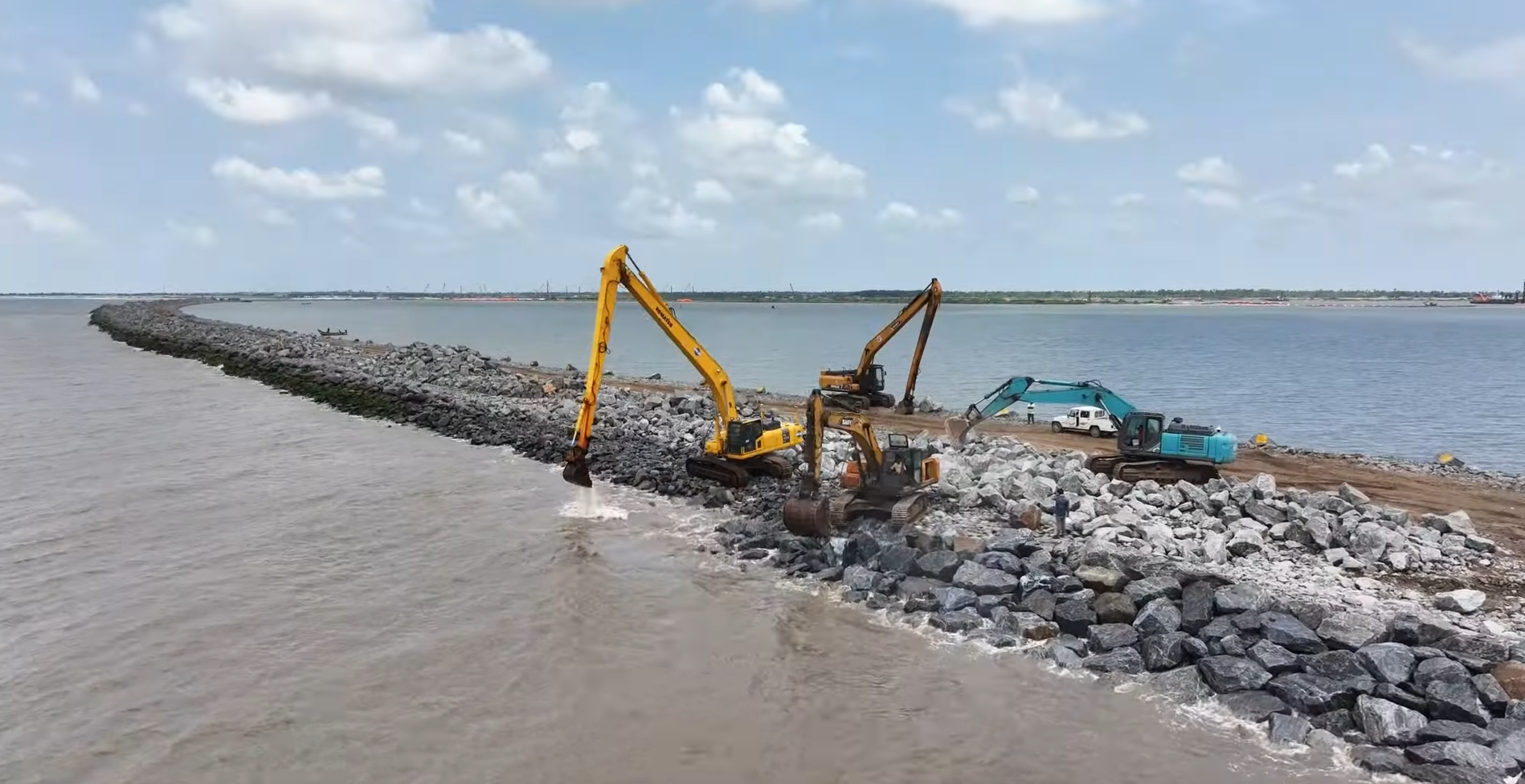
Construction of breakwater

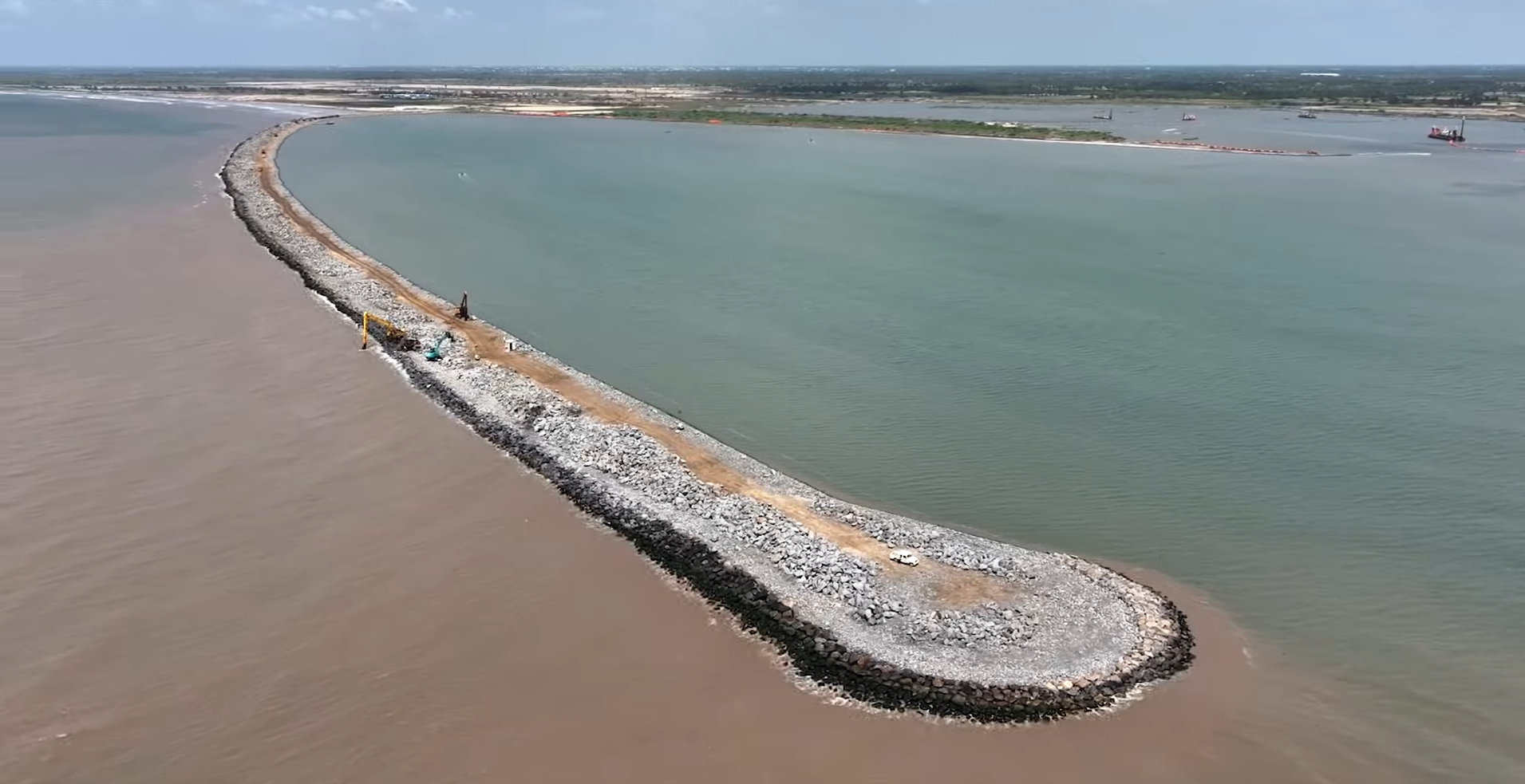
Breakwater aerial view

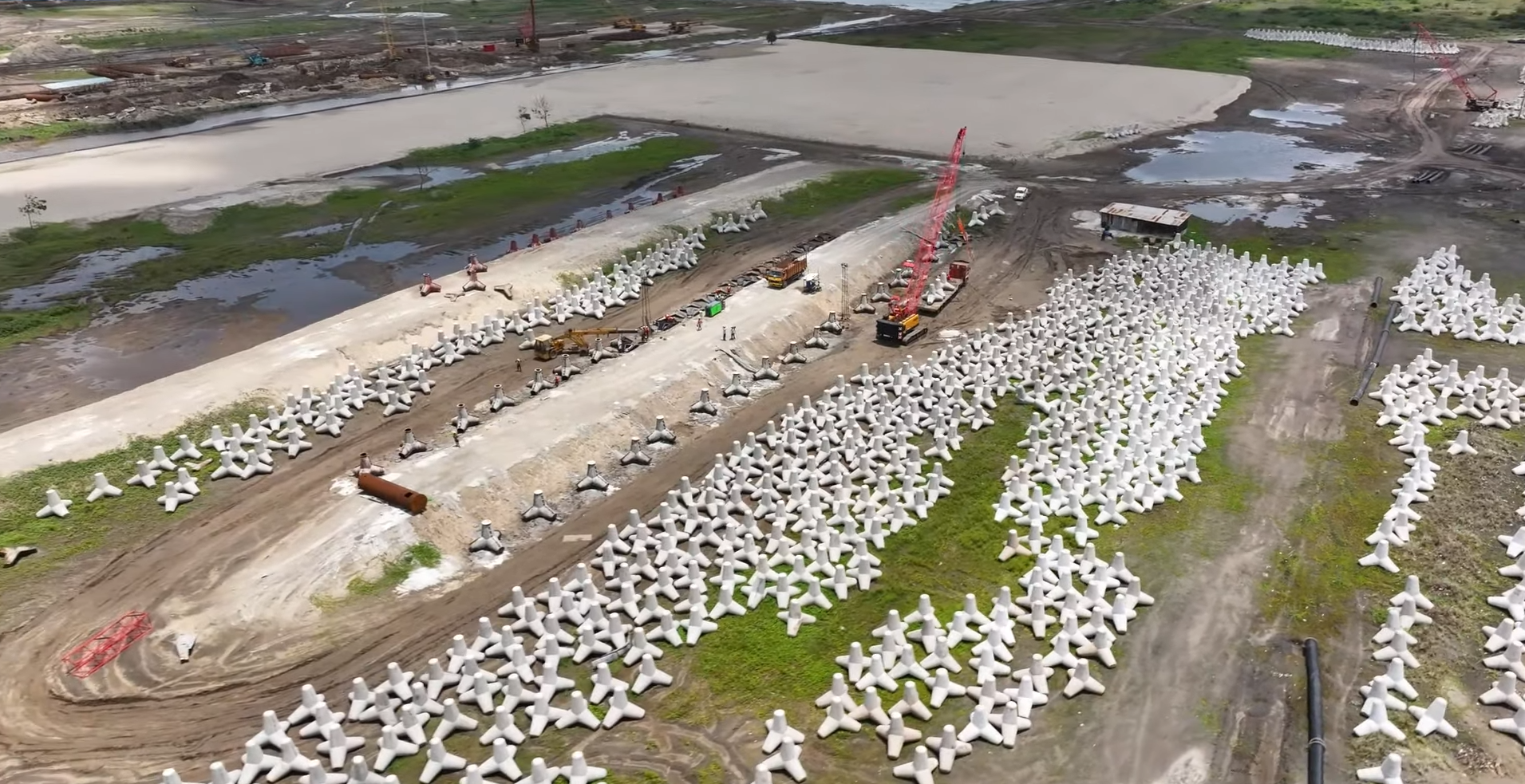
Construction material

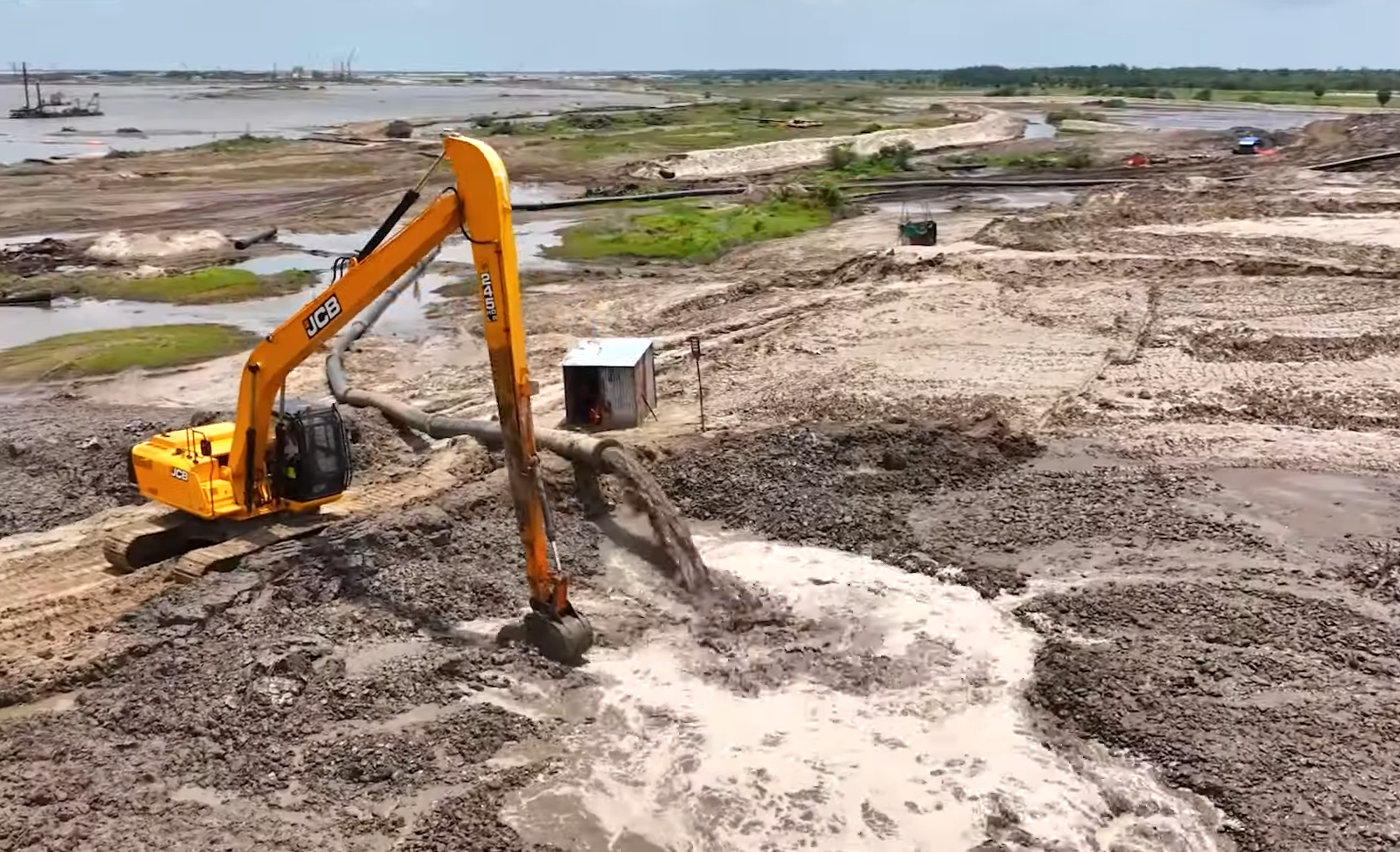
Dredging
