= Port of Yangjiang =

Coordinates: 21°42′30″N 111°48′41″E

Port of Yangjiang 阳江港
- Interactive map of Port of Yangjiang 阳江港

Location
- Country: People's Republic of China
- Location: Yangjiang, Guangdong Province

Details
- Opened: 1993
- Type of harbour: Natural Coastal Port
- No. of berths: 15

Statistics
- Website; Port of Yangjiang website

The Port of Yangjiang is a natural estuary port on the coast of the city of Yangjiang, Guangdong Province, People's Republic of China. In 2013 it had a total cargo throughput of 21 million tonnes, an increase of 30%, mostly handling ore and coal.

The Port has 1 major port area and 6 port operation areas. 15 berths.

The list of Berths include: Yangjiang Coal Terminal; Lianggang Terminal; Yangjiang Ore Terminal; Yangxi Power Station.
