= Krishnapatnam Port =

Coordinates: 14°15′N 80°08′E

Krishnapatnam Port Company Limited (KPCL)

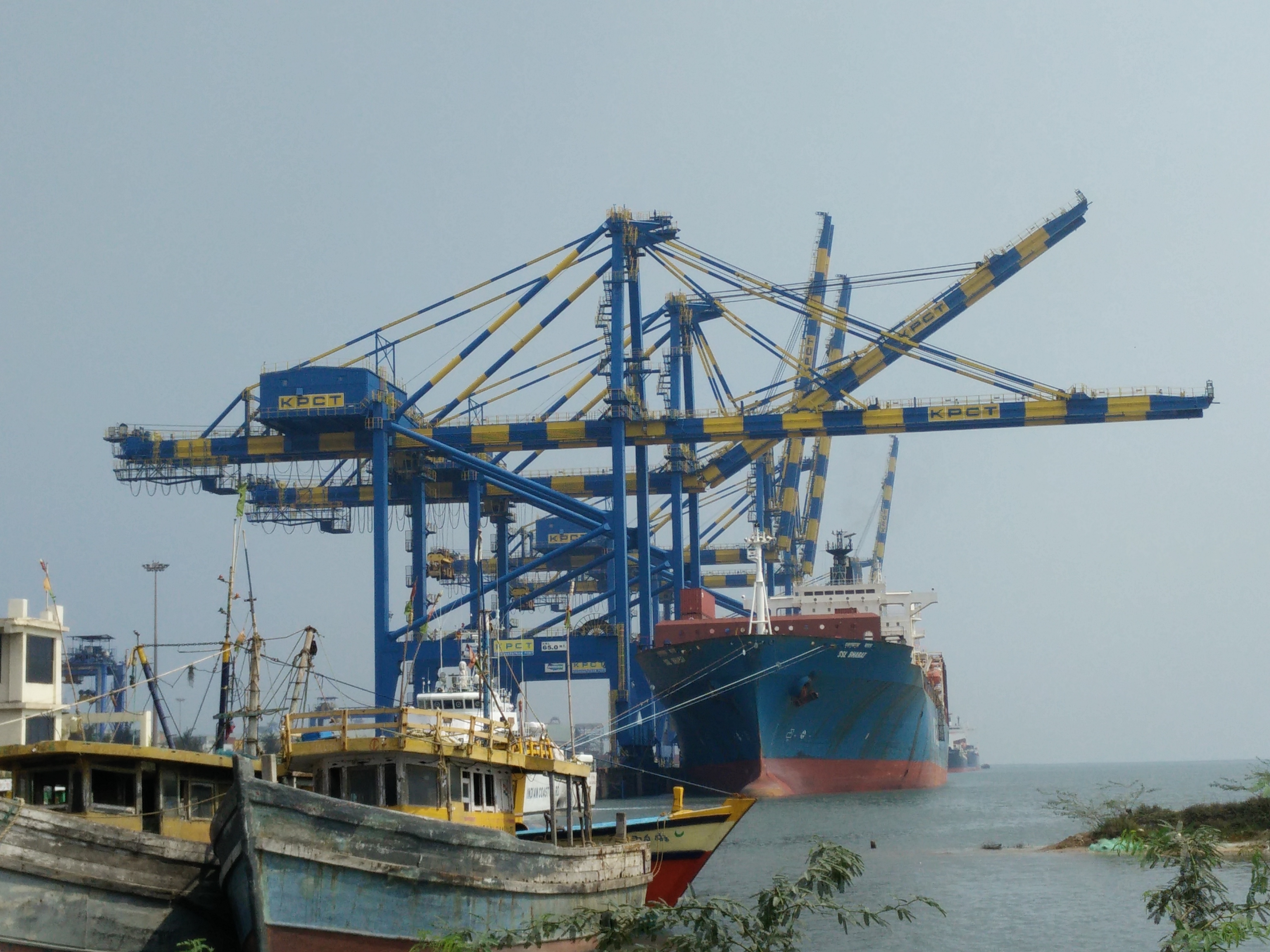
- Interactive map of Krishnapatnam Port Company Limited (KPCL)

Location
- Country: India
- Location: Krishnapatnam

Details
- Opened: 2008
- Operated by: Adani Ports & SEZ
- Owned by: Adani Group
- No. of berths: 14

Statistics
- Annual cargo tonnage: 6.4 crore tonnes (64 mtpa) (2020-21)
- Annual container volume: 8.5 million TEU (2022-23)
- Annual revenue: ₹ 1,940.23 crores (2022-23)
- Website krishnapatnamport.com adaniports.com

Krishnapatnam Port popularly known as KPCL is a privately built and owned all weather, deep water port on the east coast of India, located in the Nellore District of Andhra Pradesh. It is located about 190 km north of the Chennai Port and 18 km east of the city of Nellore. The port was owned and operated by the Krishnapatnam Port Company Limited (KPCL) which was 92% owned by Hyderabad-based CVR Group. The London-based equity firm 3i owned the remaining 8% equity in KPCL.

In October 2020, Adani Ports & SEZ acquired 75% stake in the port, which increased to 100% in April 2021 with Adani Group buying the residual 25% stake.

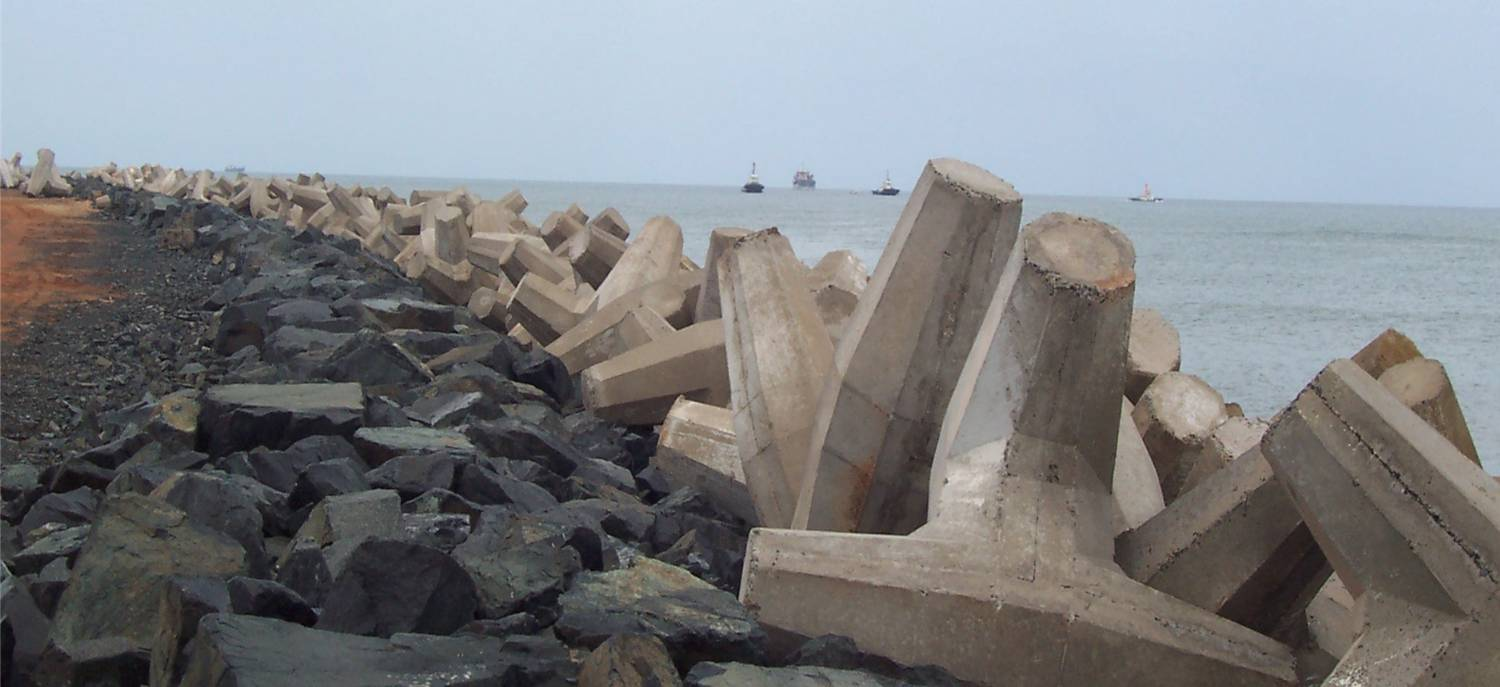
KPCL breakwater with KOLOS armour units

== Etymology ==
The port has its history back to Vijayanagar Emperor, when Sri Krishnadevaraya used to operate it. So, the name was given to it as Krishnapatnam Port. It is also known as KPCL.

== Establishment and promoters ==
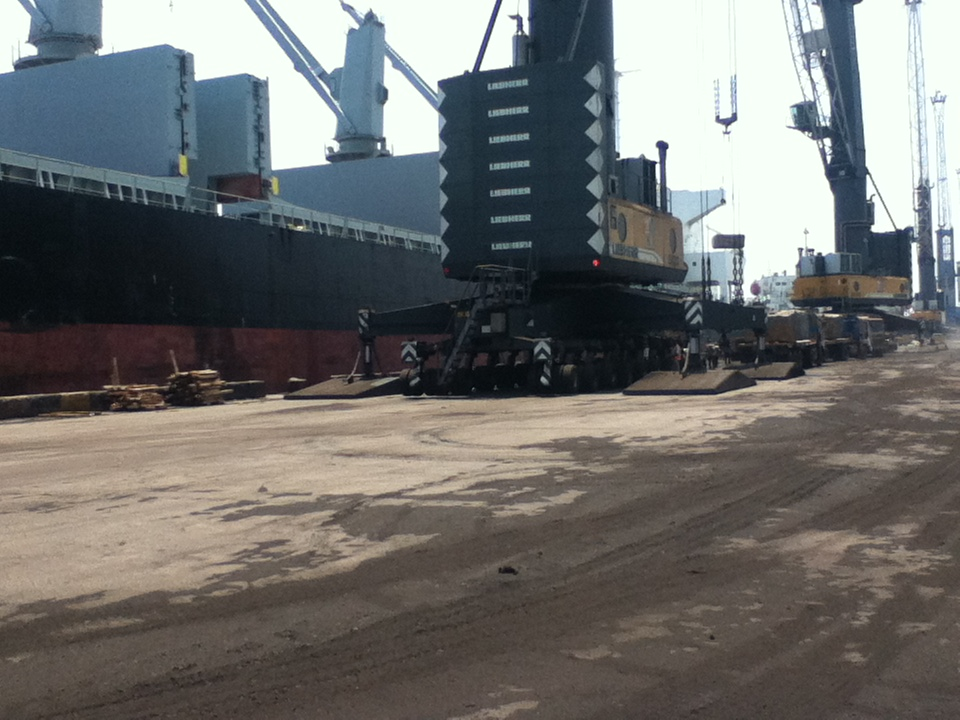
Krishnapatnam Port (KPCL)

It was inaugurated on 17 July 2008 by the UPA Chairperson Sonia Gandhi. The port was built by the Navayuga Engineering Company Limited, the flagship concern of the CVR Group, under a build-operate-share-transfer (BOST) agreement with the Government of Andhra Pradesh. The port covers an area of 4,553 acres. The BOST agreement, valid for 30 years and further extendable to 50 years, requires the promoters to pay 2.6% of the port's gross revenue to the Government of Andhra Pradesh for the first 30 years. From the 30th year, that share increases to 5.4% and from the 40th year to 10.8%. The agreement also requires them to develop the port in three phases with the first phase being completed by January 2008, the second phase by 2012 and the final by 2017.

== Connectivity and hinterland ==
As of 2015, KPCL is capable of handling 7.5 crore (75 million) tonnes (mt) of cargo per annum and is the second deepest port of India with a draft of 18 metres . The hinterland of the port includes southern and central Andhra Pradesh, eastern Karnataka, northern Tamil Nadu and Eastern Maharashtra. The port is linked to the Chennai–Kolkata rail line through a 19 km long line and is also connected with the National Highway 16 (India) which is being upgraded from a four-lane to a six-lane highway.

== Phases of development ==
The first phase of development of the port involved an expenditure of ₹1,400 crores and was completed in 2009. In this phase the Port developed an annual cargo handling capacity of 2.5 crore tonnes (25 mt). Two mechanised Iron Ore Berths, a mechanised Coal Berth and a mechanised General Cargo Berth were set up in this phase. The second phase of the Port's development entails an investment of $2 billion and the enhancement of cargo handling capacity by 4 crore tonnes (40 mt). By 2017, when the Port is fully developed, it is expected to handle 20 crore tonnes (200 mt) of cargo annually. The second phase of expansion will increase the total berths to twelve of which half will handle coal with the rest handling general, bulk and container cargo. The draft of the port is also to be enhanced from the present 18 metres to 21 metres.

== Container terminal ==
In September 2012, the KPCL inaugurated its container terminal capable of handling 12 lakh standard containers a year. This terminal is equipped with 5 Panamax gantry cranes, and 9 RTGC rubber tyre gantry cranes overall two berths length of 725 metres and a channel depth of 13.5m allowing large vessels carrying up to 8,000 containers to dock. The second phase of its development will involve the investment of ₹11,000 crores and the expansion of capacity by another 48 lakh tonnes (4.8 mt). KPCL has entered into an agreement with Container Corporation of India (CONCOR) to develop a container freight station at the port and inland container depots in the hinterland to facilitate trade through the port.

Krishnapatnam port terminal set to emerge as a major trans-shipment hub on the East Coast following dynamic initiatives being taken up by some international shipping container liners.

== Cargo handled ==
When the port was inaugurated in 2008, iron ore constituted its most important cargo which peaked at 10.5 million tonnes in 2009-'10. Since the ban on export of iron ore from the Bellary-Hospet region of Karnataka, its shipments have dwindled forcing the port to diversify its portfolio. Coal is now the primary commodity handled by the port, its volume having expanded from less than 1,00,000 tonnes in 2008-09 to 1.13 crore tonnes (11.3 mt) in 2011-12.

The port now also plans to handle liquefied natural gas cargo, cars meant for exports, edible oils and fertilisers. During 2012-13, the port handled 2.12 crore tonnes (21.2 mt) of cargo, of which three-fourths comprised imported coal. The Port handled 25.16 MT during the year 2013-14 against the target of 28 MT. The port registers very impressive growth of 60% for the year 2014-15 and ended up handling total cargo of ~4.1 crore tonnes (40.72 mt) up from 2.5 crore tonnes (25.16 MT) in the previous year.

== Special economic zone ==
A 12,000 acre Special Economic Zone (SEZ) is being set up in the vicinity of the port by the Krishnapatnam Infratech Private Limited, a special purpose vehicle set up by KPCL. The SEZ entails an investment of ₹6,000 crores and is expected to create 30,000 direct employments. The SEZ is being designed by Mahindra Engineering and is to be a multi-product SEZ.

== See also ==
- Adani Ports & SEZ
- Adani Group
- KOLOS
- Navayuga Engineering Company Limited
- Vizhinjam International Seaport Thiruvananthapuram
