= Port of Wenzhou =

Port of Wenzhou (温州港)
- Interactive map of Port of Wenzhou (温州港)

Location
- Country: People's Republic of China
- Location: Wenzhou, Zhejiang Province,
- Coordinates: 27°58′19″N 120°48′11″E

Details
- Owned by: People's Republic of China
- Type of harbour: Artificial Deep-water Seaport
- Employees: 2，000 （2012）

Statistics
- Annual cargo tonnage: 25.16 million tonnes (2013)
- Annual container volume: 570,200 TEU
- Website; Port of Wenzhou website

The Port of Wenzhou is a natural estuary deep-water international seaport on the coast of Wenzhou, Zhejiang, People's Republic of China. It opens into the East China Sea. In 2013, its total cargo throughput was 25.16 million tonnes, up 15.4% from 2012, and container throughput was 570,200 TEU, up 10.19%.

== Layout ==
The Port as of 2012 had 16 production berths, of which 4 were deep-water berths with capacity for 100,000DWT.

Wenzhou Port operates on seven port areas, three main ones and four ancillary areas.

- Zhuangyuanao Port Area (状元岙港区)
- Yueqingwan Port Area (乐清湾港区)
- Daxiaomendao Port Area (大小门岛港区)
- Oujiang Port Area (瓯江港区)
- Ruian Port Area (瑞安港区)
- Pingyang Port Area (平阳港区)
- Cangnan Port Area (苍南港区)
