= Automated border control system =

Type of automated self-service barrier

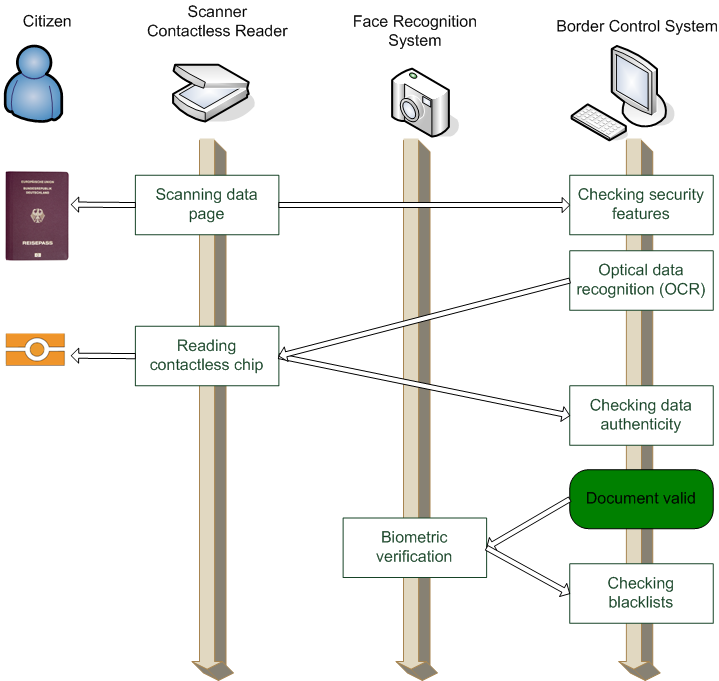
The typical work-flow of an automatic border control system (eGate)

Automated border control systems (ABC) or eGates are automated self-service barriers which use data stored in a chip in biometric passports along with a photo or fingerprint taken at the time of entering the eGates to verify the passport holder's identity. Travellers undergo biometric verification using facial or iris recognition, fingerprints, or a combination of modalities. After the identification process is complete and the passport holder's identity is verified, a physical barrier such as a gate or turnstile opens to permit passage. If the passport holder's identification is not verified or if the system malfunctions, then the gate or turnstile does not open and an immigration officer will meet the person. E-gates came about in the early 2000s as an automated method of reading the then-newly ICAO-mandated e-passports.

All eGate systems require the use of an e-passport that is machine readable or an identity card. Some countries permit only specific nationalities to use the automated border crossing systems, e.g. EU/EEA/Swiss citizens or AUS/CAN/JPN/KOR/MYS/NZL/SGP/GBR/USA passport bearers, etc. For all other nationalities, citizens must go to immigration officers to be questioned and then have their passports stamped. They come in different configurations, including a gate, kiosk and gate, or mantrap kiosk, and the process for each setup is the same for departing and arriving passengers.

In the gate configuration, an incoming passenger places their passport data page either on or under a scanner, looks at a camera that will take a live picture to compare to the picture in the passport, and walks through a set of barriers that will open if the citizen's identity is verified. At either the passport scan or photo stage, if either identity cannot be verified or a malfunction happens, an immigration officer will step in at that point. Fingerprint and/or iris scans can also be taken depending on the system. In the kiosk and gate configuration, a passenger approaches a kiosk for a facial, finger and passport scan. They then proceed to a set of doors and pass through using their fingerprint. In the mantrap kiosk configuration, a passenger walks through a first set of barriers to a kiosk for a facial, finger and passport scan. They then proceed out through a second set of barriers.

The number of e-gate units deployed globally is expected to triple from 1,100 in 2013 to more than 3,200 in 2018, according to a 2014 report by Acuity Market Intelligence. Most e-gates have been deployed in airports in Europe, Australia and Asia.

== Privacy issues ==
Automated border control systems typically collect personal information such as the information on the biometric page of the passport: name, sex, date of birth, passport number, passport photograph, nationality, and the country of origin of the passport.

Other information may also be collected, such as travel details, and the facial biometric template.

Travellers' passport booklets are typically no longer stamped if they are processed by eGates.

== Australia ==
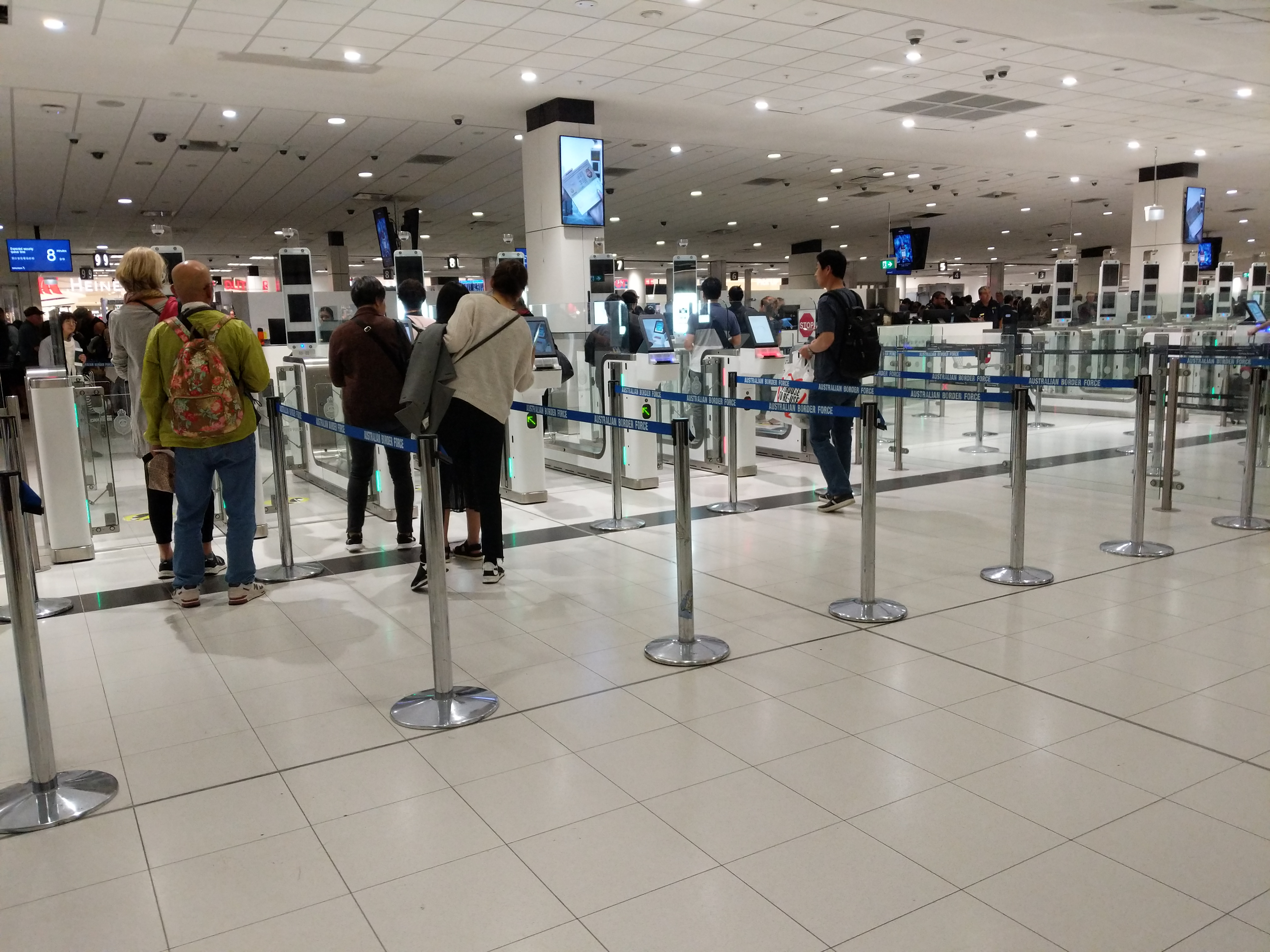
SmartGate departure gates at Sydney Airport

SmartGate is an automated self-service border control system operated by the Australian Border Force and located at immigration checkpoints in arrival halls in eight Australian international airports. SmartGates allow Australian ePassport holders and ePassport holders of a number of other countries to clear immigration controls more rapidly, and to enhance travel security by performing passport control checks electronically. SmartGate uses facial recognition technology to verify the traveller's identity against the data stored in the chip in their biometric passport, as well as checking against immigration databases.

Travellers require a biometric passport to use SmartGate as it uses information from the passport (such as photograph, name and date of birth) and in the respective countries' databases (i.e. banned travellers database) to decide whether to grant entry or departure from Australia or to generate a referral to a customs agent.

=== Eligibility ===
The SmartGates require travellers to look as much like their passport photo as possible, which may require removing accessories such as glasses, hats, or masks when using the SmartGate.

==== Requirements ====
Departing travellers, regardless of age and nationality, can use the SmartGates if they have an ePassport or machine-readable passport and can independently use the machine.

As of June 2025, previous eligibility criteria for arriving travellers based on nationality have been removed. All travellers holding an ePassport or machine-readable passport are now eligible to use arrival SmartGates - regardless of nationality.

Children aged seven and over may also use arrival SmartGates and kiosks when entering Australia, provided they are accompanied by a parent or legal guardian, possess an ePassport, and are taller than 110 cm.

==== Exceptions ====
There are a number of notable exceptions when entering and departing Australia and using SmartGate.

- If airline crew meet the above requirements they are also eligible to use SmartGate or they may continue to use the "crew lane".
- Australian and New Zealand citizens travelling on military orders may not use SmartGate upon arrival.

==== Locations ====
In Australia, SmartGates are available at the ten following international airports:

- Adelaide
- Avalon
- Brisbane
- Cairns
- Canberra
- Darwin
- Gold Coast
- Melbourne
- Perth
- Sydney

=== History ===
The first trials of SmartGate began in 2002 with Qantas aircrews. The trials were expanded in 2004 to include over 1,000 Qantas platinum frequent flyers, and in 2007 it was launched to the public at Brisbane Airport.

Since October 2005, Australia has issued only biometric passports, called ePassports. As the validity of Australian passports do not exceed 10 years, all previous Australian passports have now expired and are now biometric.

In May 2015, the Australian Government announced that SmartGate will be launched at air and sea ports, using solely biometrics to identify and process arriving passengers, with a goal of processing 90% of air travellers automatically by 2020. The introduction of biometric arrivals, under the Seamless Traveller initiative, is expected to cost approximately AUD93.7m over 5 years and be completed by March 2019.

A phased rollout of new SmartGates for international arrivals commenced in late 2022 and was completed in 2024. Since June 2025, all travellers aged over 7 years, regardless of nationality, are eligible to use the automated SmartGates when entering Australia.

== Bahrain ==
Bahrain International Airport has 12 departure e-gates and 8 arrival e-gates with a total number of 20 e-gates. They require taking photos or fingerprints depending on the directions the machine prompts for passengers. Those currently eligible to use the e-gates are Bahrain citizens and residents with valid passports or valid ID Cards, citizens of GCC Member States with valid passports and visitors with valid multi-entry visas, after a successful first arrival through a physical counter (Does not apply to citizens of Belarus, Iran, Kosovo and North Korea)

== Brazil ==
Brazil has eGates at Rio de Janeiro/Galeão International Airport and São Paulo/Guarulhos International Airport.

== Canada ==
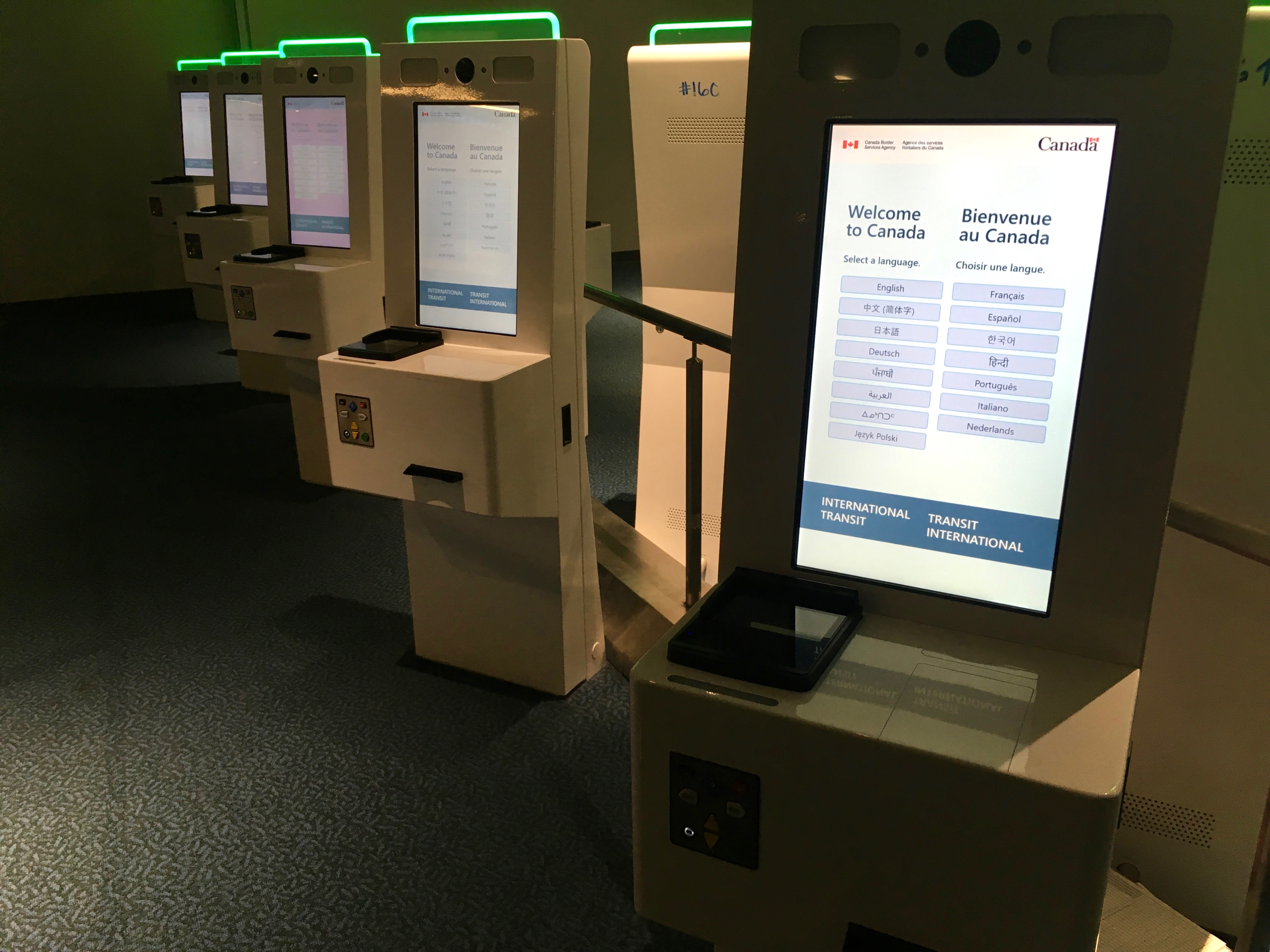
Kiosks at Vancouver International Airport (2018).

Most major Canadian airports use Primary Inspection Kiosks to screen returning Canadian citizens and permanent residents. These machines have meant that there is no longer a requirement at most major airports to complete a customs declaration form for returning citizens and residents. These machines take a photo, but may also require a fingerprint if the individual is not a Canadian citizen. These machines have been heavily criticized by travellers as the setup of these machines creates disruptive passenger flow (as opposed to eGates elsewhere), in addition to the printing of the receipt at the end of the inspection process, negating the original intent of cutting the use of paper.

Travellers must present their receipt obtained from the Primary Inspection Kiosk to a border officer, who will triage in seconds, whether the traveller needs to line up to speak with a border officer for further questioning. The border officer assigned to triage may ask the traveller a question or two, but often directs passengers almost immediately after seeing the traveller's form.

eGates were introduced in Terminal 1 of Toronto Pearson International Airport in June 2022 as part of a pilot project with the aim of reducing delays. eGates, however, still require travellers to speak to a border officer after completing their declaration.

Members of the NEXUS program for trusted travellers may use a special lane with different requirements for identification.

== China ==
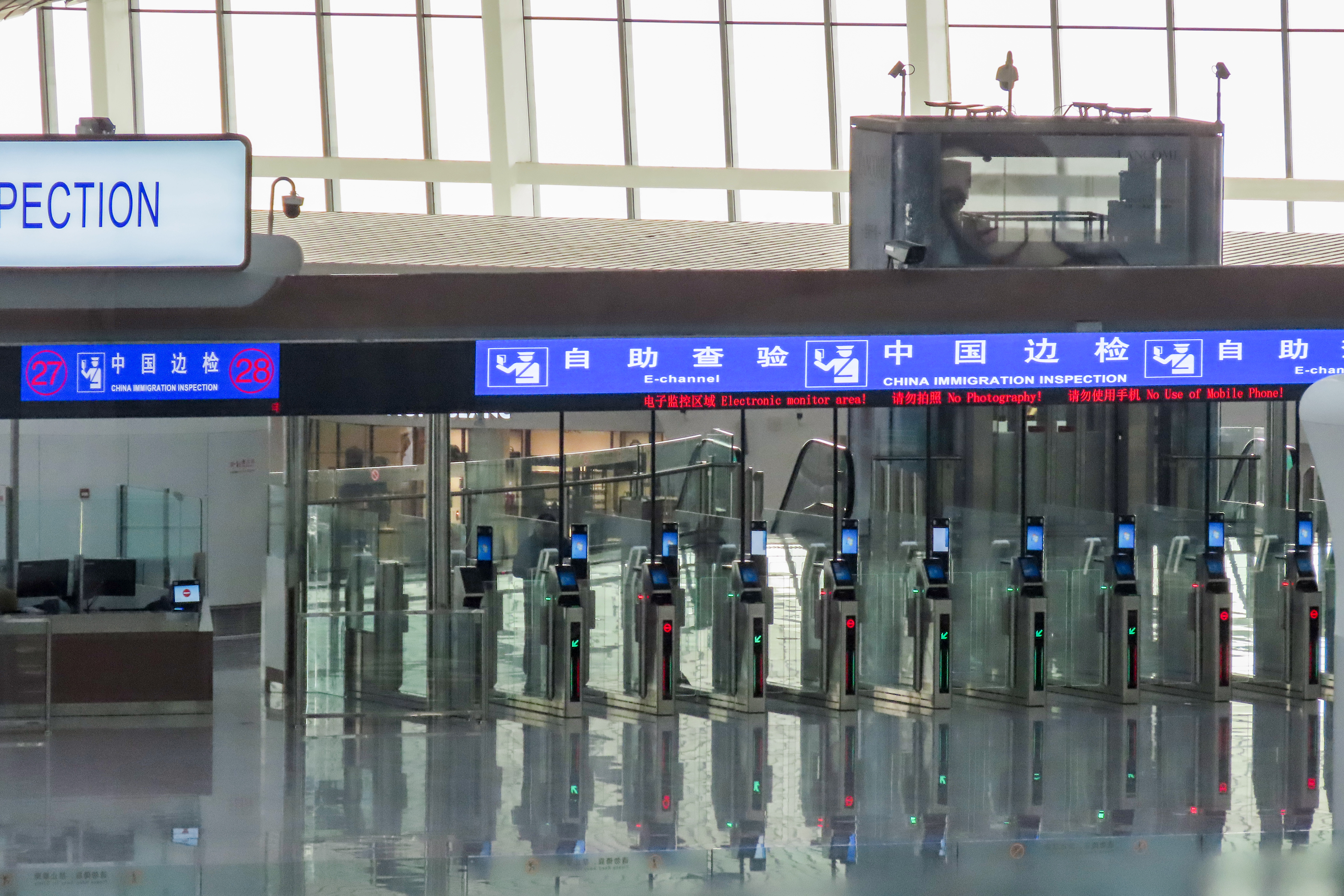
E-channel at Beijing Daxing International Airport

E-channel is a self-service immigration clearance system established by China Immigration Inspection at mainland China's entry and exit ports. This system compares the biometric features of eligible travelers with the biometric information stored in their travel documents or registered with the border inspection authorities, directly completing identity verification and document inspection. The entire process takes an average of 6 to 10 seconds.

=== Eligibility ===
==== Requirements ====
- Aged 7 or above;
- Height above 1.2 meters;
- Have registered facial and fingerprint data;
- Holders of the following valid documents:

- Chinese passport
- Exit-Entry Permits for Traveling to and from Hong Kong and Macao with valid endorsement
- Taiwan Travel Permit with valid endorsement(Excluding Tour Group (L) endorsement）
- Exit-entry Permit for Travelling to and from Hong Kong and Macao for official purposes with multiple valid endorsement
- Mainland Travel Permit for Hong Kong and Macao Resident^{1}
- Mainland Travel Permit for Hong Kong and Macao Resident (non-Chinese Citizen)^{1}
- Mainland Travel Permit for Taiwan Resident^{1}
- Exit and Entry Permit valid for one year multiple exit and entry (usable only at designated checkpoint both manual or automatic inspection channels)^{1}
- Foreign ePassport with a Residence Permit For Foreigner in The People's Republic of China valid for more than 6 months^{1}
- Foreign Passport (ePassport and other types of machine readable passport) with one of following documents:
  - Foreign Permanent Resident ID Card^{1}
  - For foreign airline crew, a passport eligible for visa-free entry or hold a crew visa (C), work visa (Z), or residence permit valid for more than one year.^{1}

_{1 - Holders of the above documents should apply and register facial and fingerprint data at designated checkpoints.}

Foreigners who meets the above requirements to entry via E-channel, may be exempted from filling in the Arrival Card.

==== Document-Free Channel ====
Starting November 20, 2024, individuals aged 14 or above who hold the specified documents and have had their facial and fingerprint information registered may use facial recognition in place of presenting documents to pass through the Document-Free Channel at Shenzhen Bay Port or Zhuhai Gongbei Port Since November 5, 2025, "Document-Free Channel" is started to apply at 12 checkpoints open for navigation and passage with Hong Kong, Macao and Taiwan regions.

The service is deployed at the following checkpoints:

- Shanghai Hongqiao International Airport
- Xiamen Gaoqi International Airport
- Xiamen Wutong Ferry Terminal
- Guangzhou Pazhou Ferry Terminal
- Guangzhou Nansha Ferry Terminal
- Shenzhen Bay Port
- Shenzhen Huanggang Port
- Shenzhen Luohu Port
- Shenzhen Liantang Port
- Shenzhen Futian Port
- Shenzhen Wenjindu Port
- Zhuhai Gongbei Port
- Zhuhai Hengqin Port
- Hong Kong–Zhuhai–Macao Bridge Zhuhai Port

The service is for holders of the following documents:

- Exit-Entry Permits for Traveling to and from Hong Kong and Macao with multiple valid stay(D), family reunion(T), business(S), talent (R)or other(Q) type of endorsements
- Mainland Travel Permit for Hong Kong and Macao Resident
- Mainland Travel Permit for Hong Kong and Macao Resident (non-Chinese Citizen)
- 5-year valid Mainland Travel Permit for Taiwan Resident

Although travelers are not required to present travel documents when using the Document-Free E-channel, they must still carry their documents for on-site verification or use in other situations.

==== Collaborative Inspection Automated Channel ====
Collaborative Inspection Automated Channel Chinese: 合作自助查验通道(simplified) 合作自助查驗通道 (traditional) Portuguese:Canal de inspecção integral automático is used for travel between mainland China and Hong Kong, and mainland China and Macau, allowing eligible travelers to queue once to complete all immigration procedures automatically.This system is currently implemented at the Hong Kong–Zhuhai–Macao Bridge Zhuhai–Macao Port, Hengqin Port, Qingmao Port, Huanggang Port and is under construction at the new joint inspection building at Shatoujiao Port(Sha Tau Kok Control Point) as part of its reconstruction project.

External videos
- 【創新通關模式】合作查驗、一次放行 Collaborative Inspection and Joint Clearance on YouTube

The following are the eligible users and documents for Collaborative Inspection Automated Channel:

Port\Document	Exit-Entry Permits for Traveling to and from Hong Kong and Macao ^{H M}	multiple entry Exit and Entry Permit valid for one year ^{C M}	Exit-entry Permit for Travelling to and from Hong Kong and Macao for official purposes ^{M}	Hong Kong Identity Card ^{C PHM}	Hong Kong Permanent Identity Card ^{C M PHM}	Mainland Travel Permit for Hong Kong and Macao Resident (Hong Kong resident) ^{C}	Mainland Travel Permit for Hong Kong and Macao Resident (Hong Kong permanent resident, regardless of nationality) ^{C M}	Macau Resident Identity Card (Hong Kong and Macao resident) ^{C PHM}	Macau Resident Identity Card (Taiwan^{PT} and foreign resident^{V}) ^{C}	Mainland Travel Permit for Hong Kong and Macao Resident (Macao resident, regardless of nationality) ^{C}	Mainland Travel Permit for Taiwan Resident ^{C M}	Foreign ePassport^{C M V}
Hong Kong-Zhuhai-Macao Bridge Zhuhai-Macao Port	✓	✓	✓	✗	✓ ✗	✗	✓	✓ ✗	✓ ✗	✓	✓	✓
Hengqin Port	✓	✓	✓	✗	✓ ✗	✗	✓	✓ ✗	✓ ✗	✓	✓	✓
Qingmao Port	✓	✗	✓	✗	✓ ✗	✗	✓	✓ ✗	✗	✓	✗	✗
Huanggang Port	✓	✗	✗	✓	✓	✓	✓	✗	✗	✗	✗	✗

^{C——Should register biometric data to China Immigration Inspection to use the China self-service clearance.}
^{H——Should register biometric data to Hong Kong Immigration Department to use the Hong Kong self-service clearance.}
^{M——Should register biometric data to Public Security Police Force to use the Macao self-service clearance.}
^{V——Holding PRC Foreign Permanent Resident ID Card or PRC Foreigner’s Residence Permit valid for over 6 months, or Macau Resident Identity Card and multiple-entry Chinese visa valid for more than 6 months.}
^{PHM——Holding Mainland Travel Permit for Hong Kong and Macao Resident or Mainland Travel Permit for Taiwan Resident.}
^{PT——Holding Mainland Travel Permit for Taiwan Resident.}
^{✓ ——Available for southbound (Note: From mainland China to Hong Kong or Macao) and northbound (Note: From Hong Kong or Macao to mainland China) travel.}
^{✗ ——Not available for both southbound and northbound travel.}
^{✓ ✗ ——Available for southbound travel.}

== European Union and Schengen Area ==
The European Union funded project FastPass, one of the Seventh Framework Programs (FP7), aims to develop and demonstrate a harmonized, modular reference system for European automated border crossing points. Another FP7 project is the ABC4EU project, the primary goal of which is to make border control more flexible by enhancing the workflow and harmonizing the functionalities of ABC e-gates.

Most ABC systems in member states of the European Economic Area (EEA) (which includes all the member states of the European Union together with the EFTA states of Iceland, Liechtenstein and Norway) and in Switzerland are available for citizens of the EEA and Switzerland to use since, according to Council Regulation (EC) No 2252–2004, all passports and travel documents issued by EFTA and EU member states shall comply with minimum security standards, and passports must incorporate a storage medium (a chip) that contains the holder's facial image and fingerprints.

It was planned that, except for Denmark, Ireland and the UK (which is no longer an EU member state), EU passports would have digital imaging and fingerprint scan biometrics placed on their RFID chips. This combination of biometrics aims to create an unrivalled level of security and protection against fraudulent identification papers. Technical specifications for the new passports have been established by the European Commission. The specifications are binding for the Schengen agreement parties, i.e. the EU countries, except Ireland and the UK, and three of the four European Free Trade Association countries – Iceland, Norway and Switzerland. These countries were obliged to implement machine readable facial images in the passports by 28 August 2006, and fingerprints by 29 June 2009. According to EU requirements, only nations that are signatories to the Schengen acquis are required to add fingerprint biometrics.

=== Austria ===
Vienna International Airport have been using the E Gates automated border control system provided by Secunet.

Citizens of the European Economic Area, Switzerland and Monaco who hold a valid biometric passport may use the E-Gates to enter Austria.

=== Belgium ===
Passengers who are over 12 years old and have an electronic passport from one of the following countries may use the eGates:

- European Union
- Canada
- Iceland
- Liechtenstein
- Monaco
- Norway
- Switzerland
- United Kingdom
- United States

This service is currently available only at Brussels International Airport as of 2024.

=== Bulgaria ===
At Sofia Airport Terminal 2, eGates are available for passengers aged 18 and older from one of the following countries may use the eGates:

- European Union
- Iceland
- Liechtenstein
- Norway
- Switzerland
- United Kingdom

After a Non-EU/EEA citizens clears the e-gate, border control officers next to the eGates are required to stamp passports.

=== Cyprus ===
BorderXpress are operated by Cyprus Port and Marine Police at Larnaca International Airport and Paphos International Airport.

The gates used facial recognition to verify the user's identity against the data stored in the chip in travellers' biometric passports.

The system can be used by the following passport holders, aged 12 and over.

- Andorra
- (Europe) European Union
- Iceland
- Liechtenstein
- Monaco
- Norway
- San Marino
- Switzerland
- (United Kingdom) United Kingdom^{1}
- Vatican City

_{1 – Including all classes of British nationality.}

After a non-EU/EEA citizen clears the e-gate, a border police officer performs the final verification and affixes a passport stamp.

=== Czech Republic ===
Easy Go enables self-service passport clearance for flights.

Citizens of the European Economic Area and Switzerland who hold a valid biometric passport and are aged 16 and above can use Easy Go to enter the country.

Prague Airport was the first airport in Eastern Europe to offer its passengers an automatic passport control at the E-Gate. It can be used by passengers arriving in Terminal 1 and is based on the German EasyPASS border control system.

=== Denmark ===
Copenhagen Airport has installed self-service passport control at the beginning of Pier C.

The automated passport control e-gates can be used by European Economic Area and Swiss citizens aged 18 or over.

=== Finland ===
The automated border control system is operated by the Finnish Border Guard and is based on the biometric identification of passengers. A real-life picture is taken to compare individual facial dimensions with the photograph held on the chip in the passport. Passengers travelling with an infant or with a wheelchair still need to choose the manual border control line.

The Finnish Border Guard will implement automated border checks for all nationalities.

Helsinki Airport has dozens of automated passport machines. These can be used by travellers who have an e-passport (biometric passport).

- Citizens of EEA, Switzerland, Japan, South Korea and United Kingdom can use the passport machines at arrival and departure.
- Citizens of United States, Canada, Australia and New Zealand can use the passport machines whenever they are departing.

=== France ===
PARAFE gates are operated by the direction centrale de la police aux frontières and located at immigration checkpoints at major French border controls and offer an alternative to using desks staffed by immigration officers. The gates used fingerprint technology and facial recognition to verify the user's identity against the data stored in the chip in travellers' biometric passports. Facial recognition gates have replaced finger recognition gates. Facial recognition is now confirmed as available at all Parafe-hosting border controls.

At present, citizens of the following countries can use the PARAFE gates for both entering and exiting the Schengen area, provided that they are aged 18 years or over and hold valid biometric passports. Minors aged 12–17 can also use the gates, but only upon arrival into France.

- Andorra
- Argentina
- Australia
- Chile
- Canada
- (Europe) EU/EEA
- Japan
- Mexico
- Monaco
- New Zealand
- Peru
- San Marino
- Singapore
- South Korea
- Switzerland
- United Kingdom
- United States

On 30 June 2023, eligibility on exit of the Schengen area was extended to all adults (aged 18 years or over), without condition of citizenship. Travellers remain subjected to the possession of a valid biometric passport. As of July 2023, this means passport holders from the following countries can use PARAFE:

- Albania
- Algeria
- Azerbaijan
- (The Bahamas) Bahamas
- Barbados
- Benin
- Bosnia and Herzegovina
- Brazil
- Cameroon
- China
- (Timor-Leste) East Timor
- Ecuador
- (Georgia (country)) Georgia
- Ivory Coast
- Kazakhstan
- Kuwait
- Lebanon
- Malaysia
- Maldives
- Morocco
- Moldova
- Montenegro
- North Macedonia
- Nepal
- Oman
- Panama
- Paraguay
- Philippines
- Qatar
- Russia
- Rwanda
- Saint Vincent and the Grenadines
- Saint Kitts and Nevis
- Serbia
- Taiwan
- Tajikistan
- Tanzania
- Thailand
- Turkmenistan
- United Arab Emirates
- Uganda
- Ukraine
- Uruguay
- Uzbekistan
- (Vatican City) Vatican
- Zimbabwe

Parafe gates are available at the following locations:

- Paris Orly
- Paris Charles de Gaulle
- Bordeaux–Mérignac Airport
- EuroAirport Basel Mulhouse Freiburg
- Lyon Airport
- Marseille Provence Airport
- Nice Côte d'Azur Airport
- Eurostar Paris Gare du Nord Terminal (juxtaposed controls)
- Eurostar London St Pancras Terminal (juxtaposed controls)
- Eurotunnel Calais Terminal (juxtaposed controls)
- Eurotunnel Folkestone Terminal (juxtaposed controls)

=== Germany ===
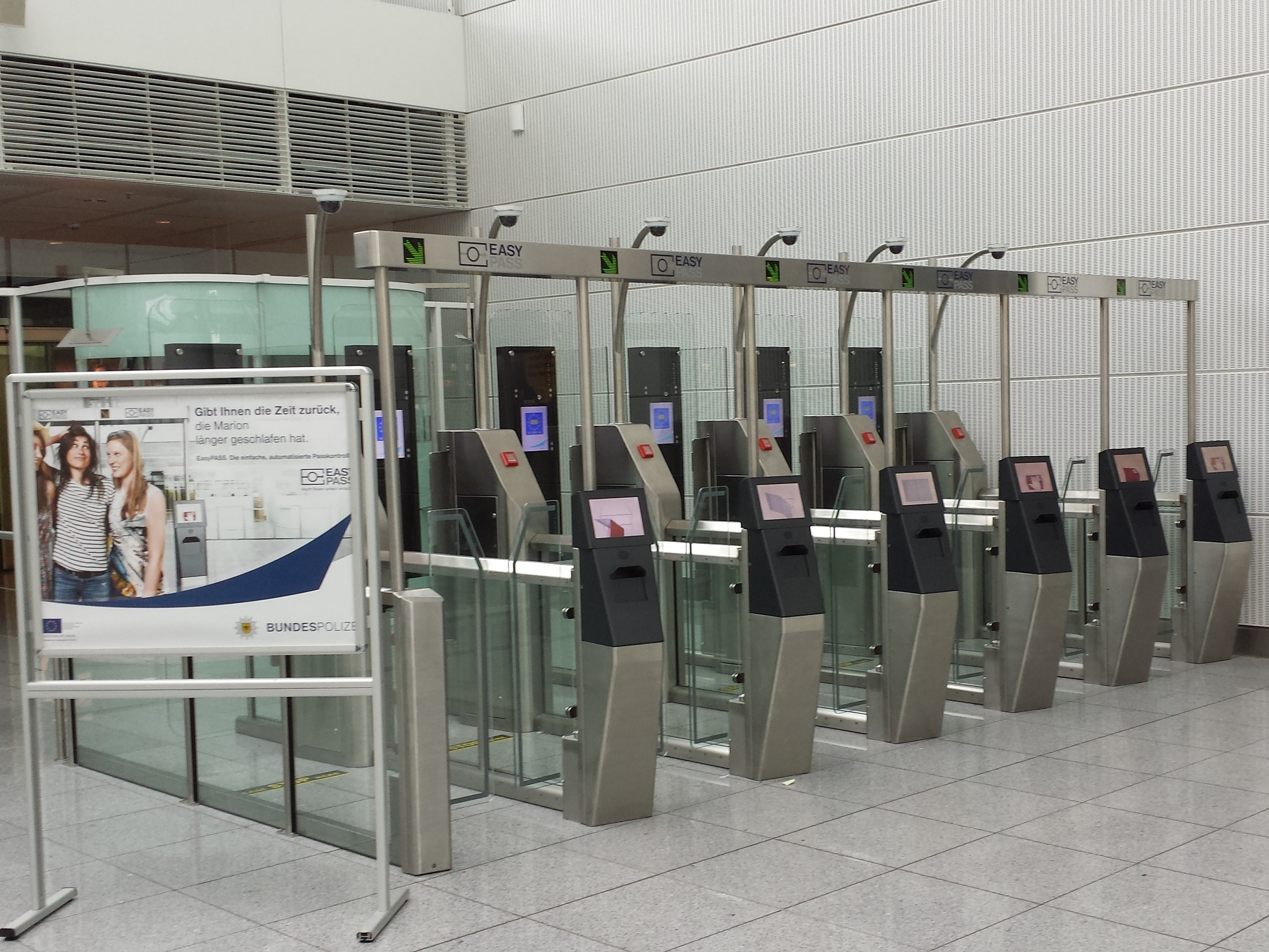
EasyPASS self-service gates at Munich Airport

EasyPASS border control system - This is available without registration for passengers over 12 with an E-Passport from a European Economic Area country or Switzerland or a German National ID cards (Personalausweis) Holders. Additionally, all passengers over 12 with a German Residence Permit linked to their E-Passport are permitted to use the system. Under the Registered Traveller Programme, United States, United Kingdom, United Arab Emirates, Hong Kong, South Korea and Taiwan E-passport holders may register to use the system at all available airports. Additionally, Andorra, Australia, Brazil, Canada, Chile, Israel, Japan, Monaco, New Zealand, Singapore and United Arab Emirates passport holders may use EasyPass without registration when entering and leaving but by only Munich International Airport.
EasyPASS is available at:

- Berlin Brandenburg Airport
- Cologne/Bonn Airport
- Düsseldorf Airport
- Frankfurt Airport
- Hamburg Airport
- Munich Airport
- Stuttgart Airport
- Hannover Airport

=== Hungary ===
Automated Gates are available at Passport Controls at some of Hungary's list of border crossings. The system involves a passport and facial scan. The system is open to passengers aged 18 and above with European Economic Area, Switzerland, Monaco and United Kingdom biometric passport holders or passengers aged 18 and above with European Economic Area and Switzerland national identity card holders.

=== Ireland ===
The Garda National Immigration Bureau operates eGates at Dublin Airport for arrivals at Terminal 1 (Piers 1 and 2) and Terminal 2. They are currently available to citizens of the European Economic Area, Switzerland and UK with electronic passports aged 18 or over.

Electronic passport holders of Australia, Canada, Japan, New Zealand and the United States that are aged 18 can also use the eGates in the Flight Connections Area of Dublin International Airport if they are in transit with an onward flight to a destination outside of the Common Travel Area.

There are proposals to extend the service to non-European citizens. Irish Passport Cards can, as of 1 January 2020, be used.

=== Italy ===
eGates eligibility screen at Venice Airport

eGates and Self Service Kiosks are operated by the Polizia di Frontiera and located at selected immigration checkpoints in non-Schengen arrival and departure halls in some airports across Italy, offering an alternative to using desks staffed by immigration officers. The gates use facial recognition technology and fingerprints (for third country nationals) to verify the user's identity against the data stored in the chip in their biometric passport. The eGates can also accept the Italian Electronic Identity Card, providing that is valid for foreign travel and issued after 7 February 2018.

Only passengers who are over 12 years old may use the eGates. Children under the age of 14 must be accompanied by a parent or a guardian.

On arrival, passport holders from the following countries can use the eGates without any pre-arrival registration requirement at the Self Service Kiosk.

- Andorra
- (Europe) European Union^{1}
- Iceland
- Liechtenstein
- Monaco
- Norway
- San Marino
- Switzerland
- Vatican City

_{1 – Only for Italian Citizens, the eGates also accept the Italian Electronic Identity Card.}

Holders of a valid Italian residence permit are eligible to use the eGates both on arrival and on departure, without any pre-registration, regardless of their nationality or whether their passport is biometric.

All other biometric passport holders (from any third country) are required to use a Self Service Kiosk on arrival for a registration with the EU Entry-Exit System. Visitors and residents holding passports from the following countries or jurisdictions are allowed to use the eGates on arrival after a successful kiosk registration, provided there is no adverse immigration record.

- Antigua and Barbuda
- Argentina
- Australia
- Barbados
- Bosnia and Herzegovina
- Brazil
- Canada
- Chile
- Colombia
- Costa Rica
- Dominica
- Hong Kong
- Israel
- Japan
- (Macau) Macao
- Malaysia
- Mexico
- Montenegro
- New Zealand
- Panama
- Saint Kitts and Nevis
- Saint Vincent and the Grenadines
- Serbia
- Seychelles
- Singapore
- South Korea
- Sovereign Military Order of Malta
- (Taiwan) Taiwan^{1}
- Timor-Leste
- United Arab Emirates
- (United Kingdom) United Kingdom^{2}
- United States
- Uruguay

_{1 – Only for those holding a passport with National ID number.}
_{2 – For holders of British passports, only British citizens are eligible.}

On departure, all holders of biometric (e-passports) are allowed to use the eGates without any Self Service Kiosk pre-registration requirement.

Some countries issuing ICAO-compliant biometric passports remain ineligible on both arrival and departure, including Pakistan, Bolivia, Dominican Republic, Brunei, Sri Lanka, Honduras, Guatemala, El Salvador and Myanmar.

At present, eGates and Self Service Kiosks are available at twenty international airports:

- Naples Airport
- Rome Fiumicino Airport
- Rome Ciampino Airport
- Bologna Guglielmo Marconi Airport
- Venice Marco Polo Airport
- Cagliari Airport
- Milan Malpensa Airport
- Milan Linate Airport
- Bari Airport
- Brindisi Airport
- Bergamo Airport
- Treviso Airport
- Verona Villafranca Airport
- Florence Airport
- Pisa International Airport
- Turin Airport
- Olbia Costa Smeralda Airport
- Catania Airport
- Palermo Airport
- Lamezia Terme Airport

Self Service Kiosks are also available at the following airports for the registration with the EU Entry-Exit system of third country nationals. However, at those airports, after a successful kiosk registration, travelers are required to proceed to staffed booths for the final clearance.

- Forlì Airport
- Perugia Airport
- Rimini Airport
- Trapani Airport
- Genoa Airport

Passport stamps are no longer issued, even if using the staffed desks or upon request.

=== Luxembourg ===
In July 2018 at Luxembourg Airport, five ABC gates were installed at passport control at departures and another five at passport control at arrivals. Passengers who are aged 18 and over and hold a valid biometric European Union, European Free Trade Association, Andorra, Monaco, San Marino or Vatican City passport may use the ABC gates.

=== Netherlands ===
The Netherlands Marechaussee has rolled out e-gates in the Netherlands over the past few years. They work by scanning facial information from the passport and, using facial recognition the image on the chip is compared to an image captured of the traveller. Currently, there are there are 78 eGates at Amsterdam Airport Schiphol. They are located in the arrival, departure and transfer areas.

The e-gates require the use of a biometric passport.

On arrival and departure, the e-gates can be used by European Union, European Economic Area and Swiss citizens aged 14 and over.

The following citizens, aged 14 and over may use the e-gates as well on arrival and departure after registration at an EES kiosk:

- Australia
- Canada
- Hong Kong
- Japan
- Malaysia
- New Zealand
- Singapore
- South Korea
- United Kingdom
- United States

For non-EU citizens, the passports will be manually stamped by a border official after using the gates.

=== Norway ===
The EasyPass system was introduced in 2012. Two automated self-service passport control units were put in place, designed in collaboration with the National Police Directorate.

Oslo Airport was the first in Norway to implement self-service passport control. Initially only Norwegian passport holders were eligible. In the autumn of 2017, eight new e-gates were installed for departing passengers, and during 2017, twelve were installed on arrival.

Norway, Switzerland and European Economic Area citizens can use the ePassport gates to enter the country provided that they are aged 12 and over and hold a valid biometric passport.

=== Portugal ===
RAPID4ALL e-gates are available at Faro Airport, Lisbon Airport Terminal 1, Madeira Airport, Ponta Delgada Airport, and Porto Airport.

On both departure and arrival, the RAPID4ALL e-gates can be used by travellers aged 18 and over holding a valid biometric passport from the European Economic Area or Switzerland or a Portuguese ID card, as well as the following non-EU countries:

- Australia
- Canada
- Japan
- New Zealand
- Singapore
- United Kingdom
- United States

On departure only, the RAPID4ALL e-gates can be used by travellers aged 18 and over holding a valid biometric passport from the European Economic Area or Switzerland or a Portuguese ID card, as well as the following non-EU countries (provided that they entered the Schengen Area through Portugal and have not overstayed the limit):

- Angola
- Brazil
- Hong Kong
- Macau
- South Korea
- Timor-Leste
- Venezuela
- China
- Taiwan

After a non-EU/EEA citizen clears the e-gate, a border police performs the final verification and affixes a passport stamp.

=== Romania ===
Romania installed their first e-gates in March 2021. The ABC gates can be used by citizens of the European Economic Area and Switzerland who hold a biometric travel document (passport or identity card) and are over 18 years old.

The gates check people's travel documents, by comparing the facial image from the electronic chip of the passport/identity card with the one captured from the person physically present at the border control, to carry out the process of identification. The gates are connected to the Information System of the Border Police and allow checks to be carried out by querying the databases and access to the relevant operative information.

Currently, they are only available at Bucharest's Henri Coanda International Airport. There are 6 e-gates for departing passengers but the Romanian Border Police intends to install up to 24 e-passport gates at Henri Coanda International Airport. The Romanian Border Police also intends to install e-gates throughout other airports in Romania in the future.

=== Spain ===
At some of the Spanish borders, Automated Border Control (ABC) is available to citizens of the European Economic Area, Switzerland and United Kingdom who are aged 18 and over with ePassports, as well as Spanish ID cards, at immigration halls, operated by the Spanish National Police. They come in either a gate, kiosk and gate, or mantrap kiosk configuration.

In the gate configuration, a passenger places their passport on a reader, looks at a camera and walks through a set of barriers. Finger scans are sometimes taken depending on the type of gate. Spanish Airports are replacing original kiosk/mantrap gates with these from providers such as Minsait and Everis. These gates also enable departing passengers to use them.

In the kiosk and gate configuration, a passenger approaches a kiosk for a facial, finger and passport scan. They then proceed to a set of doors and pass through using their fingerprint.

In the mantrap kiosk configuration, a passenger walks through a first set of barriers to a kiosk for a facial, finger and passport scan. They then proceed out through a second set of barriers.

Automated Border Control is available at the following locations:

- Port of Algeciras
- Alicante Airport
- Barcelona Airport
- Girona Airport
- Ibiza Airport
- La Linea de la Concepción
- Madrid Airport
- Málaga Airport
- Menorca Airport
- Palma de Mallorca Airport
- Tenerife South Airport

=== Switzerland ===
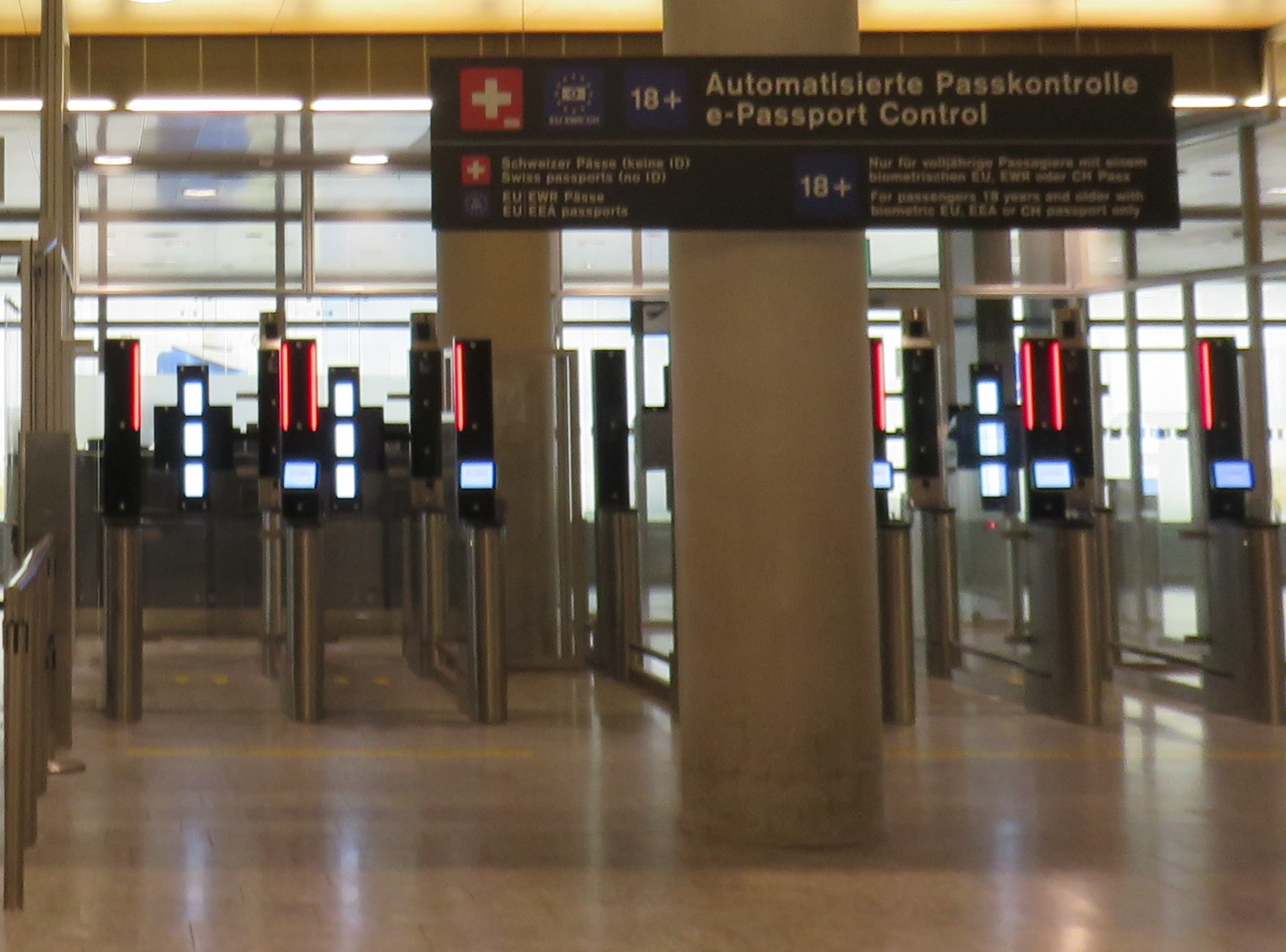
e-Passport control self-service gates at Zürich Airport

Automated passport controls were introduced at Zürich Airport in May 2018. Currently as of 2024, all passengers over 18 who are holders of biometric passports issued by Switzerland and European Economic Area member states are eligible to use them upon departure and arrival.

It was announced at the conclusion of the Switzerland–United Kingdom Free Trade Agreement on 13 July 2026 that there will be a standalone initiative to permit UK passport holders access to Swiss eGates in the near future. It is envisaged this will firstly apply to Zurich Airport, with Basel Airport and Geneva Airport following afterwards.

== Hong Kong ==
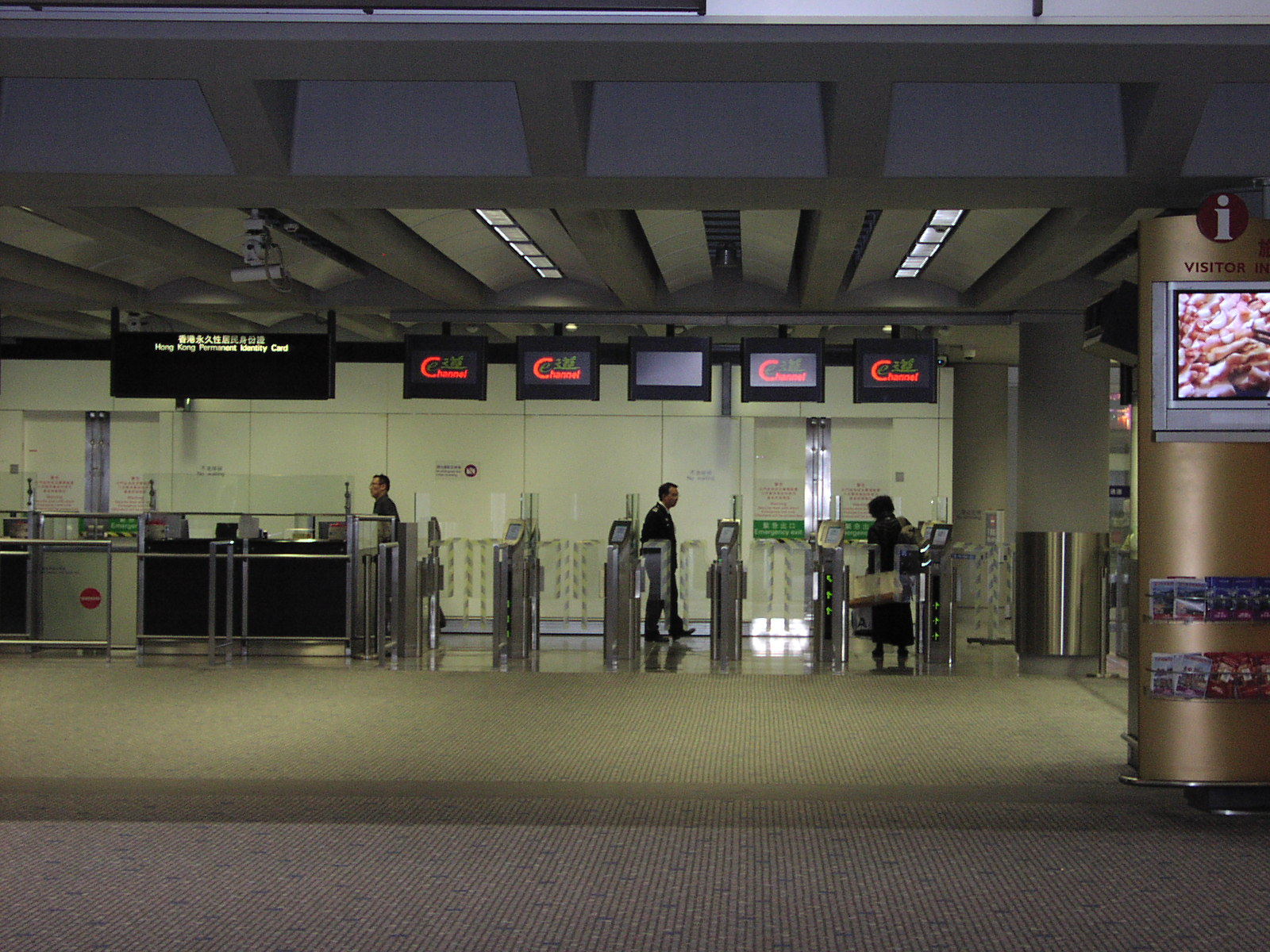
e-Channel machines at Hong Kong International Airport

Hong Kong's e-Channels are situated at all border crossing points. A person who holds a Hong Kong Identity Card (HKID) inserts the card into a slot to enter the first eGate and then has their thumbprint scanned to pass through the second eGate.

The Automated Passenger Clearance System was introduced by the Hong Kong Immigration Department in 2004 and designed to speed up border immigration processes for residents of Hong Kong, Macau and frequent visitors to Hong Kong entering and exiting the territory whether it be by land, air or sea via the use of self-service kiosks employed at various border control points.

=== Eligibility ===
- A Hong Kong permanent resident aged 7 or above (using a smart identity card)
- A Hong Kong resident aged 11 or above holding a Document of Identity for Visa Purposes (using a smart identity card and carrying a valid Document of Identity for Visa Purposes)
- A person aged 11 or above who has the right to land or is on unconditional stay in Hong Kong (using a smart identity card)
- A non-permanent resident issued with a notification label (using a smart identity card and carrying a valid travel document)
- A registered cross-boundary primary school student under the age of 11 (using the enrolled valid travel document)
- A registered frequent visitor aged 18 or above (using the enrolled valid travel document)
- A registered Macau permanent resident aged 11 or above (using a Macau permanent identity card)
- A registered mainland resident aged 11 or above (using an Electronic Exit-Entry Permit for Travelling to and from Hong Kong and Macao (e-EEP) or using a PRC passport as a transit passenger (Note: PRC passport holders are not required to register in advance.))
- A registered Republic of Korea citizen aged 18 or above and enrolled under Smart Entry Service (SES) scheme (using the Republic of Korea Passport valid for at least 6 months and having no adverse record in the HKSAR)
- An enrolled holder of a Republic of Singapore Passport aged 12 or above (using a Republic of Singapore Passport valid for at least 6 months, completed 1 trip in the past 12 months and having no adverse record in the HKSAR)
- An enrolled holder of a Kingdom of Thailand Passport aged 12 or above (using a Kingdom of Thailand Passport valid for at least 6 months, completed 1 trip in the past 12 months and having no adverse record in the HKSAR)
- An enrolled holder of a Federal Republic of Germany Passport aged 18 or above (using a Federal Republic of Germany Passport valid for at least 6 months and having no adverse record in the HKSAR)
- An enrolled holder of an Australian Passport aged 16 or above (using an Australian Passport valid for at least 6 months and having no adverse record in the HKSAR)

The user upon entrance to the e-Channel inserts his Hong Kong Identity Card into the card reader (which reads the embedded chip) or places his registered travel document or Macau Identity Card onto the document reader. The channel gate will open, the user takes his Hong Kong identity card or registered travel document or Macau Identity Card and steps in and the gate will close. Thumb or finger is then placed onto the fingerprint reader, once identity has been confirmed, another set of gates in front open allowing exit. If an issue arises and identity cannot be confirmed or a malfunction occurs, an immigration supervisor will be on hand to assist.

=== Locations ===
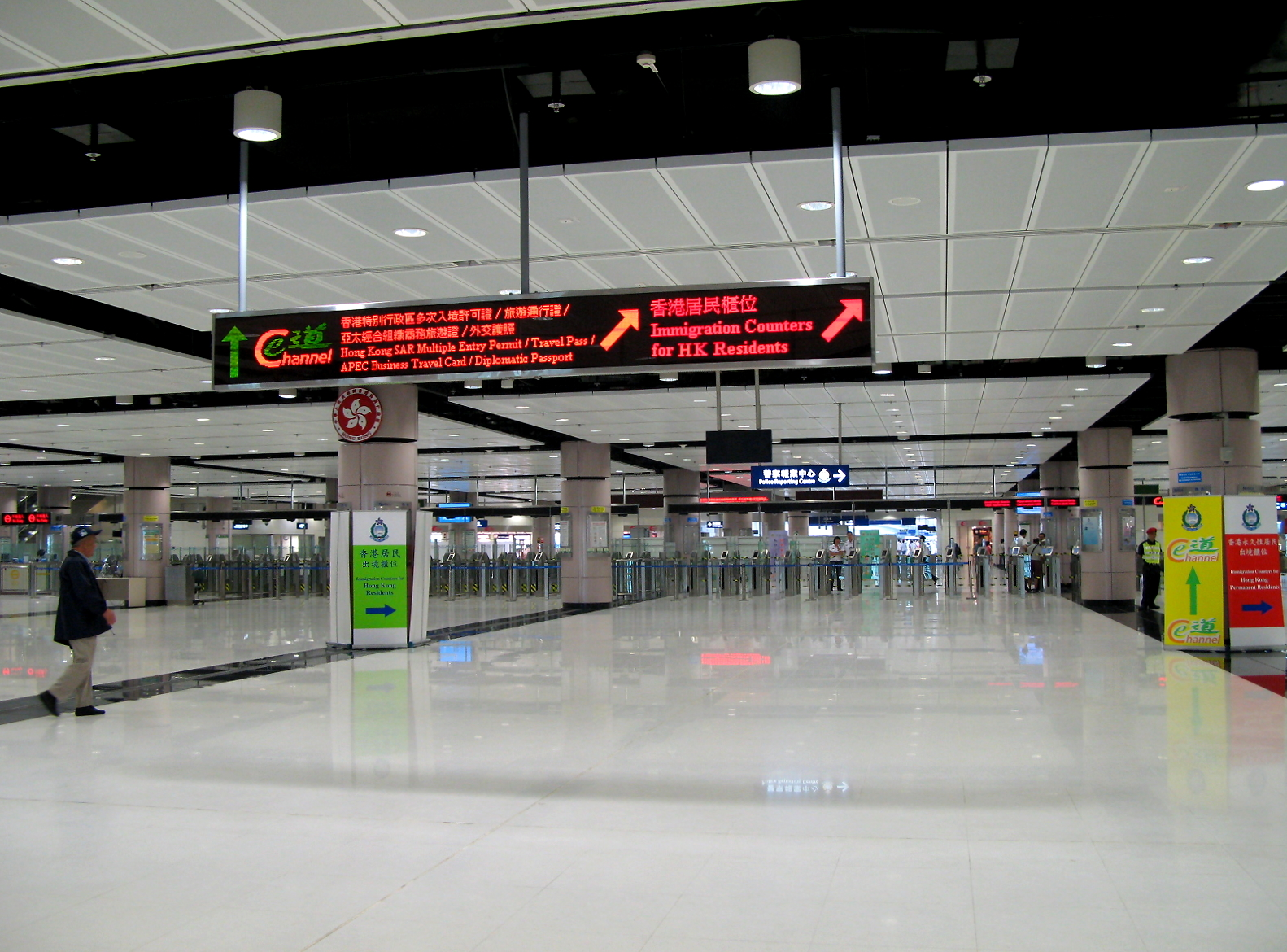
e-Channel machines at Lok Ma Chau Station

First made available on 16 December 2004 in Lo Wu Control Point, over the past several years the locations have expanded to include:

- Hong Kong International Airport
- Lo Wu Control Point
- Lok Ma Chau Control Point
- Lok Ma Chau Spur Line Control Point
- Man Kam To Control Point
- Shenzhen Bay Control Point
- Hong Kong–Zhuhai–Macau Bridge
- West Kowloon station
- Hong Kong China Ferry Terminal
- Hong Kong–Macau Ferry Terminal
- Kai Tak Cruise Terminal
- Heung Yuen Wai Control Point

By allowing registered users to use the self-service kiosks to pass through Hong Kong immigration, processing time averages around 12 seconds making E-channels far more efficient than traditional immigration counters.

=== Macau residents ===
Since its first inception where only Right to Abode Hong Kong Permanent Identity Card holders were permitted to use the self-service kiosks, the program expanded on 12 September 2006; allowing not only those of Right to Land or those with unconditional stay in Hong Kong but also to those residents and non-residents with notification labels to use the E-Channels.

The program was expanded further again on 10 December 2009 to allow holders of a Macau Resident Identity Card to register for and use of the Hong Kong E-channels to enter and exit the territory.

Border cities to Hong Kong on mainland China's side such as Shenzhen and Zhuhai have E-Channels for use of the Home Return Permit cards.

=== Frequent Visitor Automated Passenger Clearance ===
Frequent visitors to Hong Kong as well as Macau Resident Card holders can register for Frequent Visitor Automated Passenger Clearance.

A valid travel document with a multiple visit visa (if applicable), plus one of the following documents is needed:

- A valid HKSAR Travel Pass or
- An APEC Business Travel Card with the economy code 'HKG' or
- Hong Kong International Airport Frequent Visitor Card or
- Frequent Flyer Programme Membership Card issued by an airline which has joined this arrangement (please enquire with your airline).

=== e-Channel Service for foreign nationals ===
The Frequent Visitor program was further expanded to nationals of the following countries. Such arrangements are reciprocal and eligible Hong Kong Special Administrative Region passport holders may also enroll for the respective automated border clearance schemes under these countries:

- Republic of Korea enrolled under Smart Entry Service (SES) scheme (Since 16 December 2013)
- Singapore (Since 22 September 2014)
- Germany (Since 1 November 2014)
- Australia (Since 20 June 2016)
- Thailand (Since 15 September 2018)

=== One Stop Customs and Immigration clearance ===
A special vehicular E-Channel has been erected for Shenzhen Bay known as One Stop Customs and Immigration Clearance for goods vehicles passing through the Shenzhen Bay Control Point, indicating how versatile this system is, and an asset for the Hong Kong Immigration Department.

=== Smart Departure ===
Departing visitors from Hong Kong can use Smart Departure e-Channels regardless if they enrolled for the e-Channel service or not. They must be aged 11 or above and hold a valid electronic document compliant to the International Civil Aviation Organization (ICAO) and the Hong Kong Immigration Department.

- Albania
- Algeria
- Argentina
- Armenia
- Australia
- Austria
- Azerbaijan
- Belarus
- Belgium
- Benin
- Bosnia and Herzegovina
- Botswana
- Brazil
- United Kingdom
- Bulgaria
- Bahamas
- Barbados
- Canada
- Chile
- Colombia
- Ivory Coast
- Croatia
- Cyprus
- Czech Republic
- Denmark
- Estonia
- Finland
- France
- Gabon
- Georgia
- Germany
- Ghana
- Greece
- Hungary
- Iceland
- India
- Indonesia
- Iran
- Ireland
- Israel
- Italy
- Japan
- Kazakhstan
- South Korea
- Kuwait
- Latvia
- Lebanon
- Liechtenstein
- Lithuania
- Luxembourg
- Macau
- Malaysia
- Maldives
- Malta
- Mexico
- Moldova
- Monaco
- Montenegro
- Morocco
- Nepal
- Netherlands
- New Zealand
- North Macedonia
- Oman
- Panama
- Nigeria
- Norway
- China
- Peru
- Philippines
- Poland
- Portugal
- Paraguay
- Qatar
- Romania
- Russia
- Rwanda
- Senegal
- Serbia
- Singapore
- Slovakia
- Slovenia
- Spain
- Saint Kitts and Nevis
- Sweden
- Switzerland
- Tajikistan
- Tanzania
- Turkmenistan
- Thailand
- Timor-Leste
- Togo
- Turkey
- United States
- Uganda
- Ukraine
- United Arab Emirates
- Uruguay
- Uzbekistan
- Vatican City
- Venezuela
- Taiwan (Note: Mainland Travel Permit for Taiwan Residents (commonly known as "Tai Bao Zheng")holders only)

== India ==
The Fast Track Immigration–Trusted Travelers Program (FTI–TTP) allows for e-gate use using biometrics for both arrivals and departures by Indian nationals and OCI holders who complete a registration process. It doesn't require ePassport for registration. It was inaugurated at Indira Gandhi International Airport on June 22, 2024.

== Indonesia ==
Automated border control gates (also known as autogates) in Indonesia were first installed at Soekarno-Hatta International Airport in 2012. The autogates can be used by Indonesians, nationals of visa-free countries, and nationals from non-visa-free countries who have obtained a visa on arrival (see Visa policy of Indonesia). Holders of a limited long-term stay or a permanent residence permit are also eligible to use the autogates.

Indonesian citizens with all types of passports (ordinary, e-passport, polycarbonate-page e-passport) can freely use the autogates. Foreigners must have an e-passport in order to use the system. The autogates can be used by travelers aged 6 and above.

The autogates are available for use at these ports of entry:

- Soekarno-Hatta International Airport (Jakarta)
- Ngurah Rai International Airport (Bali)
- Batam Harbour Bay Ferry Terminal (Batam)
- Batam Center Ferry Terminal (Batam)

== Israel ==
Automated passport control stations at Ben Gurion Airport, May 2015

Automated border control in Israel is run by the Population and Immigration Authority, which carries out border checks at Ben Gurion Airport and at the country's other international crossings. Self-service biometric stations (Hebrew: עמדות ביומטריות) allow holders of biometric Israeli passports to enter and leave the country without being seen by a border officer. As described when the stations were introduced, the traveller inserts the passport and the station takes a facial photograph and a fingerprint, a process lasting a few seconds. Passports are not stamped: the station prints a slip, known as an Electronic Gate Pass, which carries the traveller's passport details and opens the electronic gate leading out of the border control area.

=== Eligibility ===
The stations are intended for Israeli citizens travelling on a biometric passport, who may use them on both arrival and departure. Some stations are adapted for children, people of short stature and people with disabilities. Since December 2023, Israelis travelling on an older, non-biometric passport have had to use the staffed counters on arrival.

When the enlarged set of stations was inaugurated in 2015, the Authority said they could be used by any holder of a biometric passport, whether an Israeli or a foreign tourist. In 2019 the Authority's measures for foreign visitors centred on additional staffed counters, while automated stations for foreign nationals in the border control hall were described as a later stage.

=== History ===
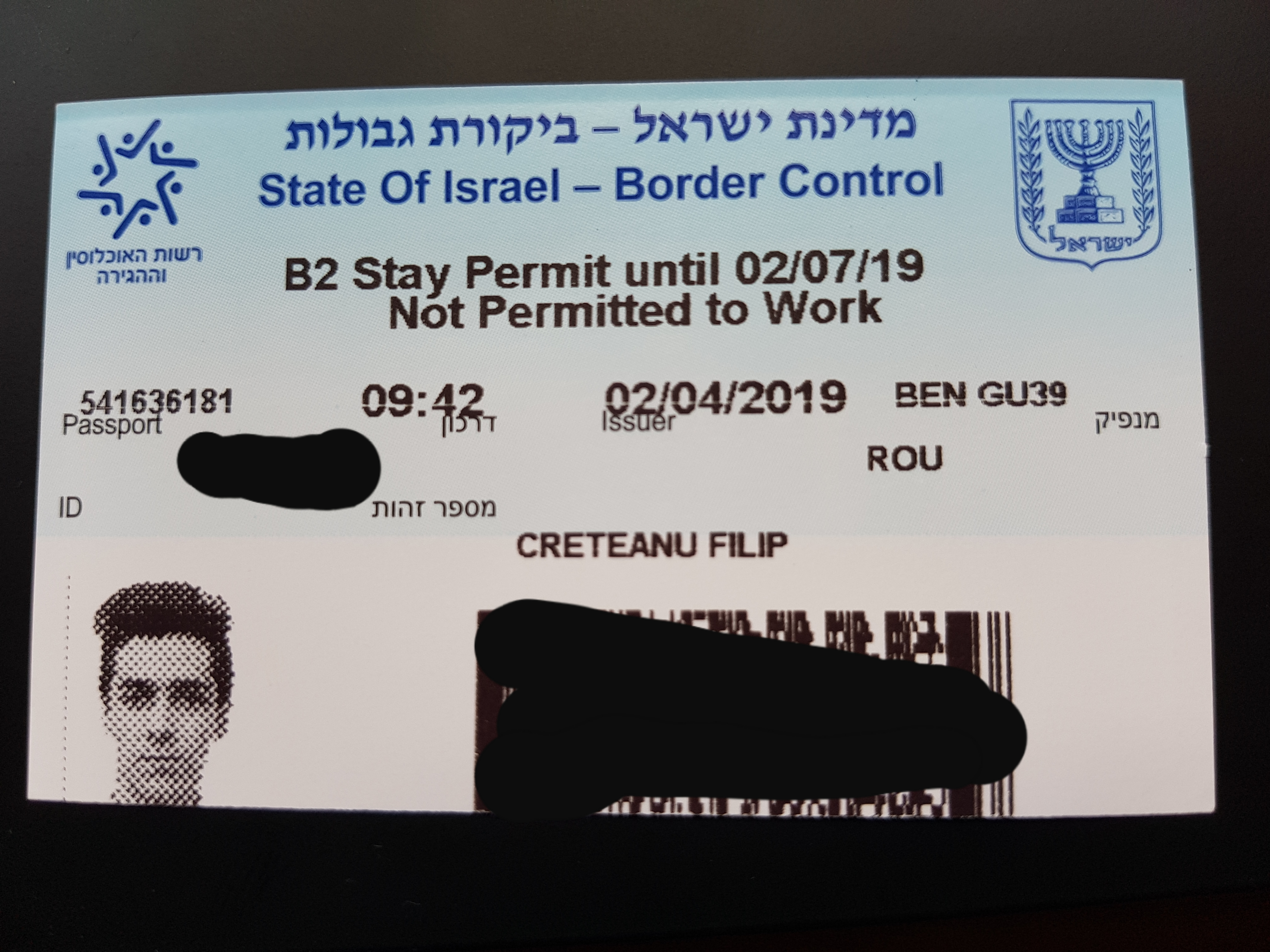
Entry slip issued at Ben Gurion Airport in place of a passport stamp

An earlier system, Express Entry, was built for Ben Gurion Airport by Electronic Data Systems (EDS) under a contract awarded in April 1998 and was operating within three months. Enrolled travellers identified themselves at a kiosk with a card and then placed a hand on a hand geometry reader, after which the kiosk printed a slip that let them bypass the staffed desks. The system started with four kiosks and had grown to 22 by 2005, when about 250,000 frequent Israeli flyers were enrolled. In 2019 it was reported that the hand readers were to be removed.

Israel began issuing biometric identity documents on 30 June 2013, and automatic crossing stations for holders of biometric passports were installed at Ben Gurion Airport alongside the staffed booths. Official use began in August 2014 with a pilot of four stations, two at entry and two at exit. In May 2015 Interior Minister Silvan Shalom inaugurated an enlarged set of 17 stations. An interim satisfaction survey carried out for the Authority by the Central Bureau of Statistics found that of more than 54,000 biometric passport holders who had flown during the survey period, about 44,000 had used the stations in at least one direction, and that over 86% of respondents were satisfied with the process.

In July 2016 further stations were placed in the three arrival concourses (B, C and D) of Terminal 3, so that holders of biometric passports could clear border control immediately after leaving the aircraft, before reaching the main border control hall. Biometric passports became compulsory in June 2017, and the State Comptroller later noted that the number of biometric stands at border crossings rose by 200% between July 2017 and July 2019. By early 2019 about 2.5 million Israelis held biometric passports and were not required to see a border officer when entering or leaving the country, and 36 stations were planned for the airport's border control hall by that summer, 15 of them suited to people with disabilities, pushchairs and children.

From 2017, separate automatic stations at Ben Gurion Airport also served holders of non-biometric Israeli passports, photographing the traveller and comparing the image with the passport photograph. In a report published in May 2023, the State Comptroller found that about 30% of the Israelis passing through the airport's automatic checkpoints, which were designed for biometric passports, did so with an old-type passport, a document the report described as easy to forge. In December 2023 the Authority stopped allowing travellers without a biometric passport to use the machines on arrival, requiring them to queue for a border officer instead; it said the step corrected deficiencies raised by the State Comptroller and closed security gaps.

== Japan ==
Japan's J-BIS Biounit is an immigration control system that was introduced into Japanese airports and located at immigration booths. Fingerprints of both index fingers are collected along with a photograph. At the same time, the person is checked against immigration office lists, and criminals, people who were previously deported, and other punished foreigners are prevented from entering Japan. On 20 November 2007, Narita Airport, Kansai International Airport, and Chūbu Centrair International Airport had the system, with plans to roll out the system to the 27 airports and 126 harbours in Japan.

Until the start of J-BIS, when people would land in Japan and apply for entry, it was difficult to tell which people had changed their names or used special names on their passports, had been deported, or had criminal records. After the events of 9/11, Japan amended its Immigration Control and Refugee Recognition Act.

On 20 November 2007, the changes to the act went into effect. Most foreigners (everyone except special permanent residents, diplomats, people who were invited by the government, and people under the age of 16) were now required to have fingerprints taken from their two index fingers, as well as a photograph. The J-BIS system was the second system of its type enacted in the world; the first was the United States's US-VISIT system.

The fingerprint scans and photographs are transferred from the airport to the immigration office's servers, and this information is compared against a blacklist in around five seconds.

This list is a collection of Interpol information and around 14,000 people that have been searched by Japanese police, as well as the fingerprints and pictures that were recorded from around 800,000 foreigners who were deported from Japan. According to the immigration office, it is predicted that 0.001% of people who enter Japan appear on the blacklist.

Since the introduction of the system, 846 people received exclusion orders by immigration authorities and 8 people were arrested for fabricating their fingerprints. The Japan Coast Guard also reported that the number of smugglers crossing the Korea Strait from the Korean peninsula has increased rapidly.

Along with the introduction of J-BIS, an "Automated gate" (自動化ゲート) was set up at Terminal 1 and 2 at Narita Airport, Haneda Airport, Chubu Centrair Airport and Kansai Airport. With this system, when a person enters or leaves Japan, rather than having to be processed by a human examiner there, a person can use an eGate, thereby making both entry and departure simpler and easier, as well as more convenient. Japanese people with valid passports, foreigners with both valid passports (this includes refugees with valid travel certificates and re-entry permits) and re-entry permits can use this system.

Automated immigration at Narita Airport.

The gate works by holding up the identification page of the passport up to the terminal in front of the transparent booth, and the entrance to the booth will open. Inside the booth, there is equipment to read fingerprints, where prints from two fingers are taken. After confirmation of identity, the exit gate will open. Although there is a worker sitting at the gate, according to the Ministry of Justice immigration office's information guide to the automated gates, most Japanese should be able to use the automated gate. When the automated gate is used, passports are not stamped. When an entry stamp is needed, officials are available near the gate to stamp passports; alternatively, one can use the regular gate.

To use Japanese eGates, prior registration is required. For details, see the Ministry of Justice immigration office's information guide. For this advance registration, Japanese people (those who hold Japanese passports), only fingerprints are needed (not an image), as the automated gate does not take a picture.

== Macau ==
Macau uses the same E-Channel system as Hong Kong. Macau residents, Hong Kong ID Card holders, Exit-Entry Permit for Travelling to and from Hong Kong and Macau holders for mainland residents can use this service. Checkpoints in Zhuhai have E-Channels which process Home Return Permit cards.

=== E-Channel Service for foreign nationals ===
In addition as of 2024, all foreign visitors aged 12 or above who hold a passport that is valid for 90 days and is issued by the following countries and territories can use the E-Channel conveniently upon finishing registration (unless otherwise stated) under reciprocity. Additionally, minors aged 12 to 17 are required to be accompanied by a parent or guardian to be eligible for the E-Channel.

- Australia
- Brazil
- France
- Malaysia
- Portugal^{1}
- Singapore
- South Korea
- United Kingdom

_{1 - Portuguese passport holders may use the E-Channel only on departure from Macau under reciprocity.}

Foreign visitor holding a valid passport with Foreign Permanent Resident ID Card or Foreigner’s Residence Permit (more than 6 months) of the People’s Republic of China is available to use the service.

== Malaysia ==
Malaysia's NIISe eGate is the automated border control module of the National Integrated Immigration System, it was introduced nationwide in phases and designed to replace the old Malaysian Immigration System eGate.

Malaysia was the first country in the world to issue biometric passports in 1998. As such, it was among the first to adopt the use of an automated border control system to facilitate immigration clearance for Malaysian citizens. The Autogate system is available at most immigration checkpoints for all Malaysian passport holders. The system uses facial recognition and thumbprint verification to match against information stored in the traveller's biometric passport. On 22 September 2025, the MyNIISe eGates was introduced at Sultan Abu Bakar Complex and Sultan Iskandar Building as a trial phase for testing.

Biometric passport holders of the following countries may use the NIISe eGate at Kuala Lumpur International Airport, Sultan Iskandar Building, Sultan Abu Bakar Complex, Penang International Airport, Bukit Bunga ICQS Complex and Senai International Airport.

- European Union member states
- Albania
- Andorra
- Armenia
- Australia
- Azerbaijan
- Belarus
- Bosnia and Herzegovina
- Brunei
- Bahrain
- Canada
- China
- (Georgia (country)) Georgia
- Hong Kong (Note: Hong Kong and Macao passport holders are required to select “Hong Kong” or “Macao” as their nationality during MDAC registration to ensure the correct visa-free period is granted. Both are now eligible to use the autogates at the available Malaysian airports.)
- Iceland
- Japan
- Jordan
- Kuwait
- Liechtenstein
- (Macau) Macao
- Moldova
- New Zealand
- North Macedonia
- Norway
- Oman
- Qatar
- Russia
- San Marino
- Saudi Arabia
- Singapore
- South Korea
- Switzerland
- Taiwan
- Turkey
- Ukraine
- United Arab Emirates
- United Kingdom
- United States of America

The NIISe eGate may also be used by passport holders of 8 ASEAN countries, although currently limited to only Departure. The following countries are Cambodia, Indonesia, Laos, Myanmar, the Philippines, Thailand, Timor-Leste and Vietnam.

At the two road border checkpoints with Singapore (Sultan Iskandar Building in Johor Bahru, Sultan Abu Bakar Complex in Iskandar Puteri), all Singaporean citizens (with the exception of those with Malaysian Permanent Residency status) are eligible to use the Autogate system (with initial pre-enrollment required at the manual counters) under the MACS 2.0 program. In addition, MBIKE is open to registered Malaysian motorcyclists, using an RFID sticker in the registered user's passport.

The Malaysia Automated Clearance System (MACS) can be used by registered Singapore citizens, Singapore permanent residents and foreigners residing in Singapore. However, registration for the MACS scheme has been suspended since August 2018, although existing registered users may continue to use automated clearance until the expiration of their MACS stickers.

== Mexico ==
Mexico's Viajero Confiable program is only open to Mexican and US citizens who are members of Global Entry. It is a Western Hemisphere Travel Initiative (WHTI) program and prospective members must pass a background check, interview with a Mexican immigration officer, and have fingerprints and iris scans taken. Kiosks are currently available at the Cancun, Los Cabos, and Mexico City international airports, but the Mexican government hopes to expand it to other cities in the near future.

In January 2023, Mexico began operating eGates as part of a pilot program, which enabled citizens from Canada and the United States to clear passport control without interacting with a border control officer. These eGates are at Cancun's airport in terminals 3 and 4, and involve the passport holder entering a booth by themselves, scanning their passport and having their picture taken. The Mexican government plans to expand eGates next to airports in Los Cabos and Puerto Vallarta.

== New Zealand ==
New Zealand also operates the Australian manufactured SmartGate system (renamed as eGates) at Auckland, Wellington, Christchurch and Queenstown airports. eGates can only be used by travellers 10 years of age or older. E-passports from the following countries are eligible to use the New Zealand eGates (as of 13 October 2025).

- Andorra
- Argentina
- Australia
- Austria
- Bahrain
- Belgium
- Brazil
- Bulgaria
- Canada
- Chile
- China
- Croatia
- Cyprus
- Czech Republic
- Denmark
- Estonia
- Finland
- France
- Germany
- Greece
- Hong Kong
- Hungary
- Iceland
- (Republic of Ireland) Ireland
- Italy
- Japan
- Kuwait
- Latvia
- Liechtenstein
- Lithuania
- Luxembourg
- Macau
- Malaysia
- Malta
- Mexico
- Monaco
- Netherlands
- New Zealand
- Norway
- Oman
- Philippines
- Poland
- Portugal
- Romania
- San Marino
- Seychelles
- Singapore
- Slovakia
- Slovenia
- South Korea
- Spain
- Sweden
- Switzerland
- Taiwan
- Thailand
- United Arab Emirates
- United Kingdom
- United States
- Vatican City

New Zealand eGates use biometrics to match the stored image in the ePassport with the picture of the user taken at the gate.

To make sure eGate can do this, travellers must make sure they look as similar to their ePassport photos as possible and remove veils, scarves and hats that obscures any part of the face. Glasses may be left in place if worn in the ePassport photo and they have thin frames. eGate can handle minor changes in your face, for example if the travellers' weight or hair has changed.

Customs, Biosecurity and Immigration officials will use information provided at eGates, including photos, to clear travellers and their items across New Zealand's border.

Biometric information is kept for three months before destruction but other information, including about movements across New Zealand's border is kept indefinitely and handled in accordance with the Privacy Act 1993, or as the law authorises. This might include information being used by or shared with other law enforcement or border control authorities.

Unlike Australian eGates, arriving passengers aren't required to complete a questionnaire before reaching the eGate.

== Philippines ==
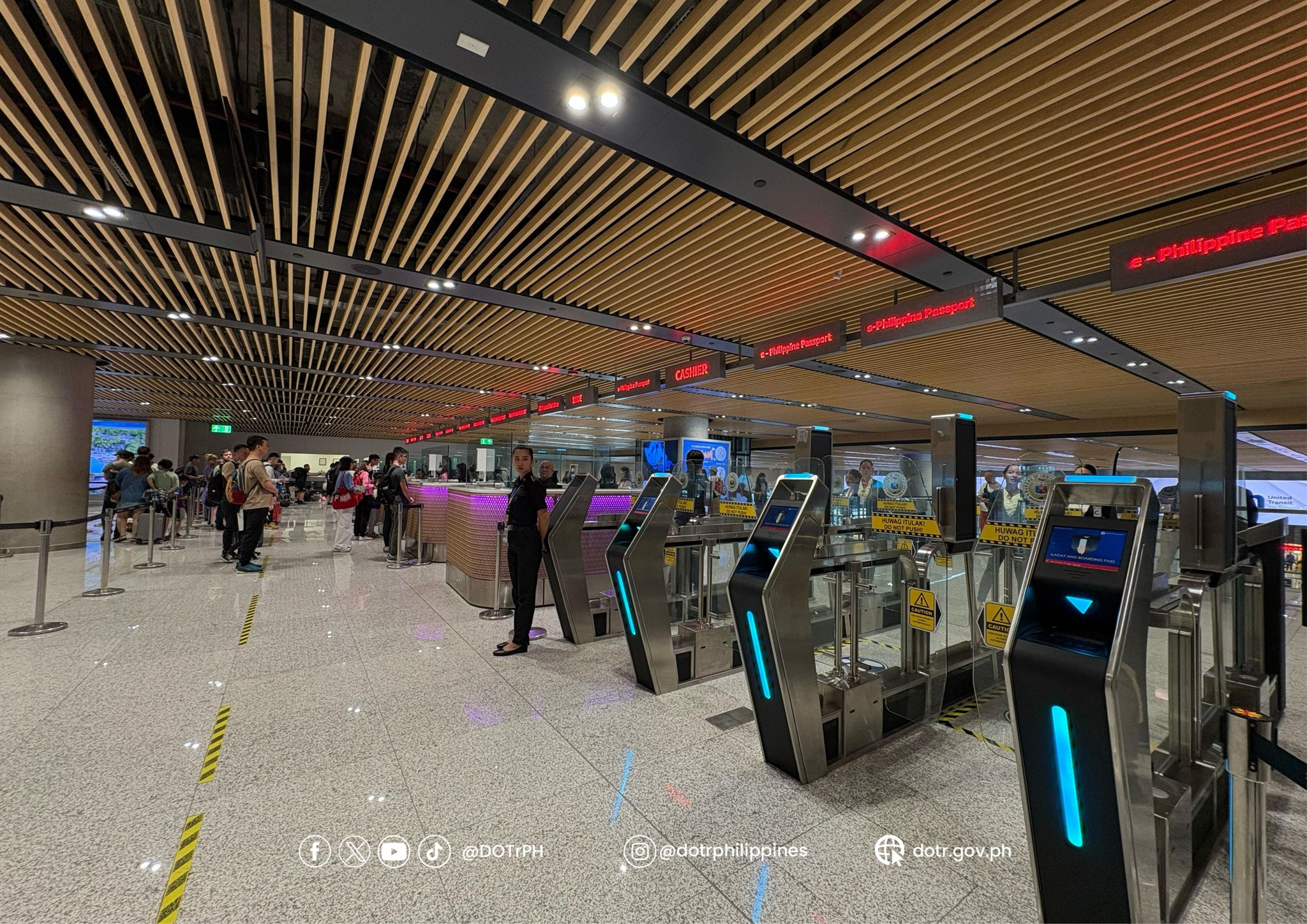
eGates at Mactan–Cebu International Airport

The Philippines' Bureau of Immigration (BI) operates eGates procured from the Taiwan-based MiTAC Computing Technology Corp. through a joint venture with Ascent Solutions at Clark International Airport, Francisco Bangoy International Airport in Davao, Mactan–Cebu International Airport, and Ninoy Aquino International Airport (NAIA) in Manila. The first gates were launched at NAIA in October 2018 solely for arriving biometric Philippine passport holders. The bureau stated that the utilization of eGates reduces the processing time per passenger by 30 seconds maximum. As of 2023, 21 eGates are in use across the Philippines, most of which are situated at NAIA. By 2026, this had expanded to 78 eGates at NAIA Terminals 1 and 3.

The BI suspended the operations of eGates at Philippine airports in March 2020 when the COVID-19 pandemic emerged due to concerns that the biometric fingerprint scanning feature could potentially expose passengers to the COVID-19 virus and facilitate its spread. The bureau lifted the suspension in December 2021.

In December 2025, the BI together with New NAIA Infra Corp. (NNIC) began operating new eGates at NAIA made by the Spanish firm Amadeus IT Group. Throughout the first half of 2026, the BI and NNIC added more eGates at NAIA's terminals, at both arrivals and—for the first time—departures. eGate eligibility for departing travellers was initially limited to Overseas Filipino Workers (OFWs), but is set to be extended to other travellers in phases throughout 2026.

== Qatar ==
E-Gate is a program that allows Qatari nationals, expatriate citizens of Qatar and GCC nationals to apply for an e-gate card by visiting the Ministry of Interior office in Al Gharafa (Doha).

== Russia ==
Russia's automated passport control system (Russian: автоматизированная система паспортного контроля, ASPK) Sapsan (Russian: Сапсан, "peregrine falcon") consists of self-service booths at airport border checkpoints that clear travellers without the involvement of an officer of the FSB Border Service. The booths were developed by the Russian company GazIntech and use document-recognition software from Smart Engines. A booth reads the passport and its chip, verifies the traveller's face and fingerprint, and decides automatically whether the traveller may cross the border. According to the Ministry of Transport, a check takes 30 to 45 seconds on average.

The traveller inserts the passport into a reader, scans the boarding pass when departing, looks into a camera, gives a fingerprint and selects the destination and purpose of travel on a touchscreen; if all checks are passed, the second door of the booth opens, and otherwise the traveller is sent to a staffed desk. Passports are not stamped by the booth, but a traveller who wants an entry or exit stamp can hand the passport to an officer at a desk located just after the automated booths.

=== Eligibility ===
Sapsan can be used on international flights by Russian citizens aged 18 or over who hold a biometric international passport of series 75 or higher. Foreign nationals and minors cannot use the booths, and families travelling with children must use the staffed desks.

=== Locations ===
Sapsan booths are available at the following airports:

- Sheremetyevo International Airport (Moscow), Terminal C
- Vnukovo International Airport (Moscow)
- Koltsovo International Airport (Yekaterinburg)

=== History ===
In January 2019 the newspaper Izvestia reported, citing the Federal Security Service (FSB), that prototype self-service booths were being tested at Sheremetyevo and that further booths were planned for Domodedovo and Vnukovo. During the trial, passengers still had to show their documents to a border officer after leaving the booth.

Sapsan entered service in Sheremetyevo's Terminal C in 2021 with 20 booths, ten for departing and ten for arriving passengers. The airport put the capacity of the Terminal C installation at up to 2,000 passengers an hour, and by August 2022 it said that more than 500,000 travellers had used the booths. In May 2026 the airport increased the number of booths in the Terminal C arrivals area to 20 and reported 30 Sapsan booths operating in the terminal.

Vnukovo launched Sapsan on 17 July 2025, with booths in both the departure and the arrival passport control areas; the airport had earlier announced five booths for each direction in Terminal A. Later that month Koltsovo Airport in Yekaterinburg opened a rebuilt border checkpoint equipped with eight Sapsan modules, becoming the first regional airport in Russia to offer the service. In March 2025 the operator of Pulkovo Airport in Saint Petersburg issued a tender for design work on equipping its border checkpoint with Sapsan, and extension of the system to Domodedovo and to airports in southern Russia has also been discussed.

=== Biometric registration of foreign nationals ===
Separately from Sapsan, Russia collects fingerprints and facial images from foreign nationals and stateless persons at the border under an experiment that began in December 2024 at the four Moscow airports (Sheremetyevo, Domodedovo, Vnukovo and Zhukovsky) and at the Mashtakovo road checkpoint on the border with Kazakhstan. On 30 June 2025 the scheme was extended to all Russian border entry points, and most visa-free travellers were required to submit their details in advance through the ruID mobile application. Diplomats, children under six and citizens of Belarus are exempt.

== Singapore ==
The Immigration and Checkpoints Authority of Singapore (ICA) has integrated information technology to streamline the entry and exit procedure at checkpoints. Singapore citizens, permanent residents and other registered travellers can use automated lanes called the enhanced-Immigration Automated Clearance System (eIACS). Foreign visitors whose fingerprints are registered on arrival may use the eIACS lanes for exit clearance. The Biometric Identification of Motorbikers (BIKES) System at land checkpoints can be used by residents and work pass holders entering and leaving Singapore by motorcycle.

The Frequent Traveller Programme (FTP) allows eligible travellers to enjoy convenient immigration clearance via the eIACS automated clearance facilities. APEC Business Travel Card (ABTC) holders or visitors who have visited at least 2 times within the last 24 months, from certain eligible countries, are able to apply. Eligible countries or regions include Australia, Japan, Malaysia, South Korea, United Kingdom ("British Citizen" only), New Zealand, Thailand, People's Republic of China (with prior approval of 5-year, multiple-entry visas and Hong Kong SAR passport) and the United States (for citizens who are existing members of the U.S. Global Entry Programme (GEP)), with age variations depending on the type of nationality.

In 2016, ICA began the biometric registering and verification of travellers using the Bioscreen system. Singapore citizens and Permanent Residents have their iris bio-data registered as well.

In 2019, ICA began trialing using the facial and iris recognition as an upgrade to the current fingerprint recognition at various land and air border checkpoints.

In May 2022, ICA announced that from the second half of this year, foreign travellers who have enrolled their facial and iris biometrics on their initial visit to Singapore will be able to obtain automated immigration clearance on subsequent trips to Singapore.

Under the Immigration & Checkpoints Authority (ICA)'s Automated Clearance Initiative (ACI), eligible foreign visitors, including those visiting Singapore for the first time, can use automated lanes for both arrival and departure immigration clearance without the need for prior enrolment. As of April 2023, the ACI was deployed to 130 automated lanes at Changi Airport and 40 automated lanes at the land checkpoints.

Travellers are required to provide a valid email address within their SG Arrival card submissions in order to receive their Electronic Visit Pass (e-Pass) when using the automated lanes; travellers will not be issued an arrival immigration endorsement in their passports.

Under the ACI, eligible arriving foreign visitors are directed to the automated lanes for immigration clearance.

a) Their biometrics (iris, facial and fingerprint images) are automatically enrolled during the arrival clearance process (if not already enrolled during a previous trip to Singapore).

b) Information on their enrolment is included in the electronic visit pass (e-Pass) which is emailed to them after immigration clearance.

c) Enrolled foreign visitors will then be able to use any automated lane during departure and on subsequent visits to Singapore.

ACI is a critical component of ICA's New Clearance Concept (NCC), which aimed to make automated immigration clearance the norm at the checkpoints. Automated immigration lanes leverage multi-modal biometric scanning technology to provide travellers with a more secure, efficient, and seamless immigration clearance experience. 95% of all arrivals at Changi Airport are expected to be cleared through the automated lanes, by the first quarter of 2024.

Through the use of automated lanes which take up less physical space and require less manpower than manual counters, ICA would be able to increase its clearance throughput and meet the growing traveller volume, which was expected to reach 300 million travellers per year by 2025.

From 17 May 2024, the ICA permitted all passport holders, regardless of nationality to use the automated gates at all land, sea, and air checkpoints on both arrival and departure. This includes first-time visitors to Singapore.

On 30 September 2024, the ICA adopted passport-less clearance at all 4 terminals at Changi airport. Without presenting their passport, Singaporeans, Permanent Residents and long-term pass holders can pass through immigration by only their facial and iris biometrics on arrival and departure. All other visitors can only use passport-free clearance on departure.

On 16 December 2024, the ICA extended passport-less clearance for Singaporeans, Permanent Residents and long-term pass holders at Marina-Bay Cruise Center. This facility is available to them on both arrival and departure.

== South Korea ==
South Korea's Smart Entry Service (SeS) is a voluntary program that allows pre-approved and trusted travellers to proceed through South Korean immigration using biometric information included in their passports at eGates. Typically this takes less than 12 seconds.

Eligible applicants register their fingerprints and facial image in advance and must agree to the use of their registered personal information.

South Koreans aged 7 or above, citizens from selected countries, foreigners aged 17 or above and holding a Korean Alien Registration Card, foreign crew members with multiple-entry visas, and foreigners holding a Korea Priority Card issued by Ministry of Justice are eligible. Foreign nationalities eligible to register include American citizens enrolled in Global Entry, Hong Kong SAR passport holders, Macau SAR passport holders, and Taiwanese passport holders. The nationals must not hold a Korean Alien Registration Card. For Hong Kong, Macau, and Taiwan passport holders, they must not use other passports such as People's Republic of China passport, British National (Overseas) passport, and Portuguese passport when they enter South Korea to be eligible.

== Serbia ==
The automated passport control was introduced to Belgrade Nikola Tesla Airport back in December 2010 as a donation of the German company Millbauer.

On 20 December 2024, a new eGate system was implemented at Belgrade Nikola Tesla Airport passport control. Initially, the new e-gates could have been used only by the adult Serbian citizens using their biometric Serbian passports. Before the introduction of the latest iteration of the eGates, article 47 of the Serbian law dealing with border control - Zakon o graničnoj kontroli - had to be modified and approved by the legislature so that the requirement for stamping Serbian passports on exit control could be dropped from the law.

On 4 April 2025, the use of the e-gates at Belgrade Nikola Tesla Airport has been extended to citizens from the following countries:

- Serbia
- Austria
- Belgium
- Bulgaria
- Czech Republic
- Finland
- France
- Germany
- Hungary
- (Republic of Ireland) Ireland
- Italy
- Latvia
- Luxembourg
- Netherlands
- Norway
- Romania
- Slovakia
- Spain
- Sweden
- Switzerland
- United Kingdom
- United States

== Taiwan ==
Taiwan's eGate is a free automated entry system for Republic of China citizens and certain classes of residents and frequent visitors.

Users simply scan their travel documents at the gate and are passed through for facial recognition. Electronic fingerprinting is used when facial recognition fails. Registration is available at the immigration counter right at the port of entry.

Passengers who are over 10 years old and at least 120cm height, holding an electronic passport from one of the following countries (pre-enrolment registration required at the manual immigration office near checkpoint) may use the eGates:

- Australia
- Malaysia
- Germany
- New Zealand
- Italy
- Singapore
- South Korea
- United States

== Thailand ==
Thailand's automated passport control (APC) system at Suvarnabhumi Airport and Don Mueang International Airport has been available for only Thai nationals since 2012. In addition, Hong Kong and Singapore E-Passport Holders can also use the automated passport control gates on both departure and arrival from Thailand under current reciprocal agreements. Since 15 December 2023, the APC system can be used for all nationalities with an electronic passport but only when on departure from the country and if have not overstayed the limit.

== Turkey ==
Automated Passport Control gates, called "Hızlı Pasaport Geçiş Sistemi" (Expedited Passport-Entry System) was introduced first in Istanbul's Sabiha Gökçen Airport in May 2019, quickly followed by the newly opened Istanbul Airport in June 2019. Citizens of Turkey with a valid and chipped biometric passport (both old and new chipped-models are accepted, but must not be issued by consulates or embassies abroad) are eligible to use the automated gates, which require passengers to scan their passports and fingerprints, as well as using a facial-recognition system by taking a live photograph of the passenger. In the departure immigration checkpoints, a Turkish Border Police Officer will check the departure tax stamp/card ("Harç Pulu") for Turkish citizens. Receiving an exit / entry stamp is optional for Turkish citizens.

== United Arab Emirates ==
The UAE's Smart Gate system allows UAE nationals, UAE residents, GCC nationals and nationals of visa-exempt countries to arrive and depart the country without the need to see an immigration officer. The process takes 30 seconds.

== United Kingdom ==
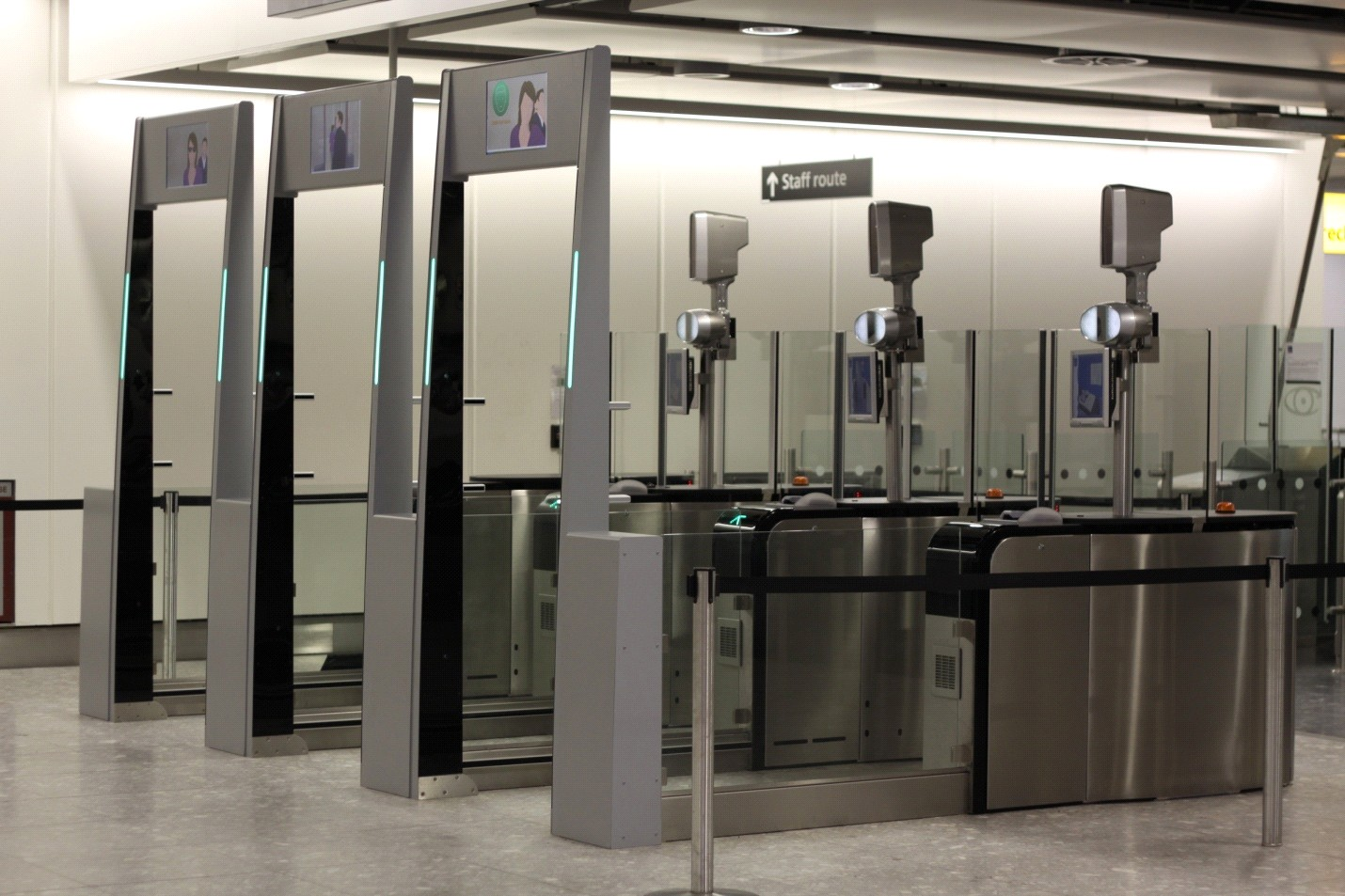
ePassport gates in Heathrow Airport (Terminal 4)

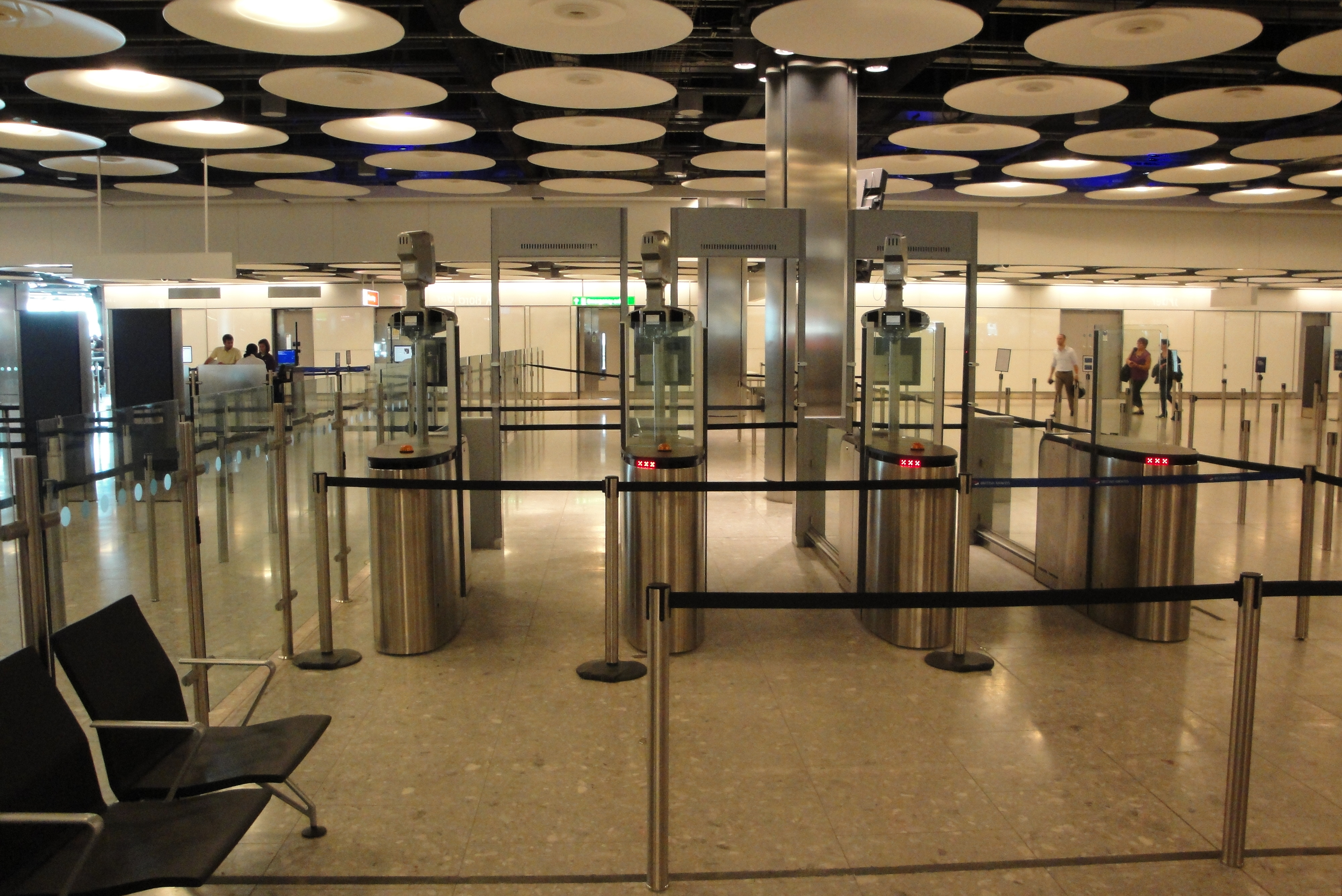
ePassport gates in Heathrow Airport (Terminal 5)

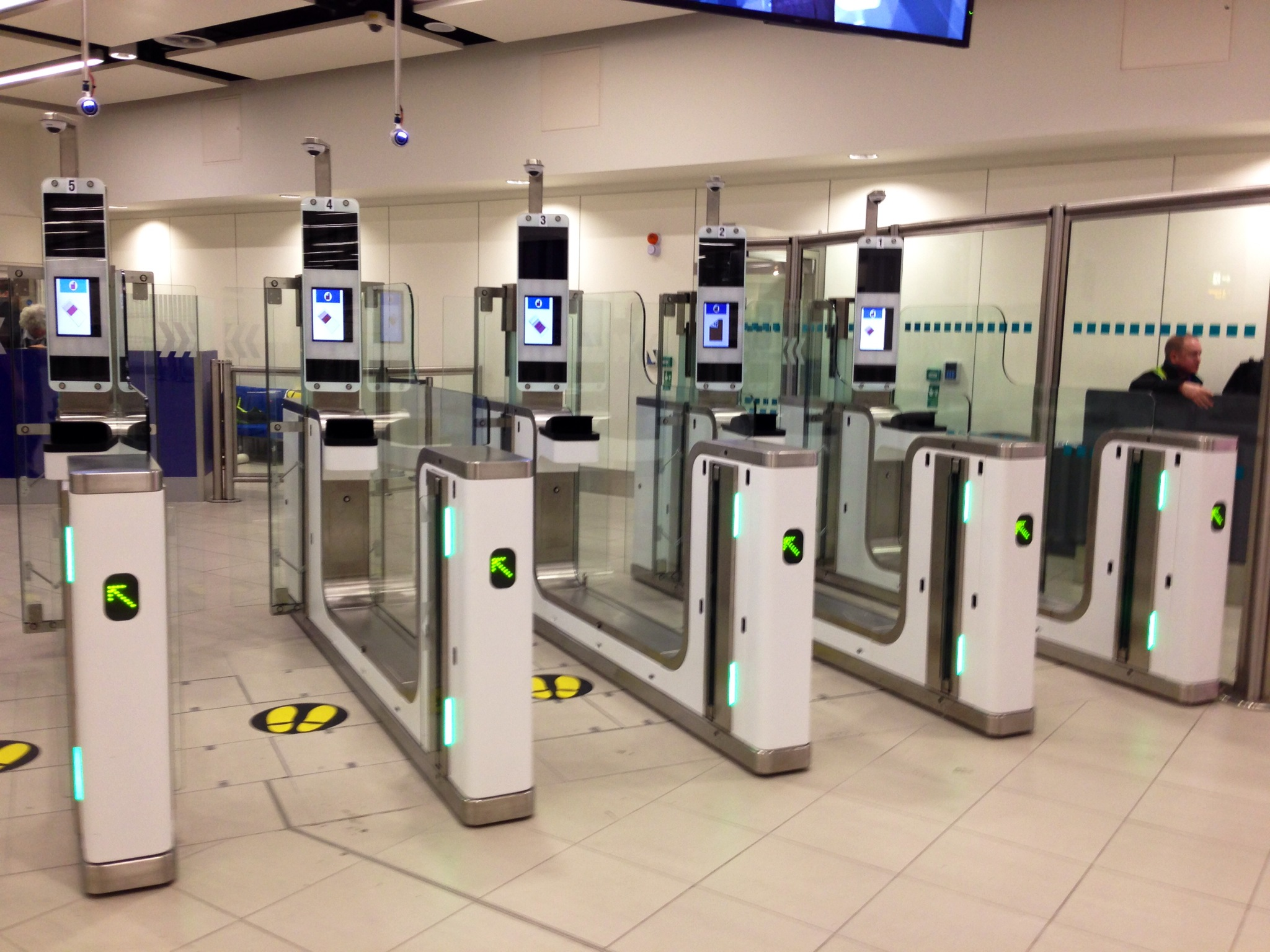
ePassport gates in Gatwick Airport (South Terminal)

ePassport gates are operated by the UK Border Force and located at immigration checkpoints in arrival halls in some airports across the United Kingdom, offering an alternative to using desks staffed by immigration officers. The gates use facial recognition technology to verify the user's identity against the data stored in the chip in their biometric passport. The ePassport gates do not accept national identity cards, even though EU/EEA national identity cards are accepted at manned gates under the EU Settlement Scheme.

Citizens with European Economic Area, European Union, Swiss, Australian, Canadian, Japanese, New Zealand, Singaporean, South Korean, and United States passports can use ePassport gates, provided that they are aged either 10 or over and holding valid biometric passports. Users between the ages of 10 and 17 who are using ePassport gates are required to be accompanied by an adult. From Wednesday 8 July, this will include users between the ages of 8 and 9.

- Australia
- Canada
- (Europe) EU/EEA
- Japan
- New Zealand
- Singapore
- South Korea
- Switzerland
- United Kingdom
- United States

Holders of valid biometric passports from the following countries can use ePassport gates, provided that they are aged 12 or over and are already enrolled as a "Registered Traveller":

- Andorra
- Argentina
- (The Bahamas) Bahamas
- Belize
- Brazil
- Brunei Darussalam
- Chile
- Costa Rica
- Guatemala
- (Vatican City) Holy See
- Hong Kong SAR
- Israel
- Macau SAR
- Malaysia
- Maldives
- Mexico
- Monaco
- Nauru
- Nicaragua
- Panama
- Papua New Guinea
- Paraguay
- Saint Vincent and the Grenadines
- Samoa
- Seychelles
- Taiwan (Note: Only for holders with their personal ID numbers stipulated in their respective passports. Taiwan issues passports without ID numbers to some persons not having the right to reside in Taiwan, including nationals without household registration.)
- Tonga
- Trinidad and Tobago
- Uruguay

ePassport gates are available at the following locations:

- Birmingham Airport
- Bristol Airport
- Cardiff Airport
- East Midlands Airport
- Edinburgh Airport
- Eurostar Brussels-Midi Terminal (juxtaposed controls)
- Eurostar Paris Gare du Nord (juxtaposed controls)
- Gatwick Airport (North and South Terminals)
- Glasgow Airport
- Heathrow Airport (Terminals 2, 3, 4 and 5)†
- London City Airport
- Luton Airport
- Manchester Airport (Terminals 1, 2 and 3)
- Newcastle Airport
- Stansted Airport

† Heathrow Airport Terminal 1 became obsolete on 29 June 2015.

== United States ==
A system called Automated Passport Control (APC) was previously available, without having to pre-register, to U.S. citizens, U.S. lawful permanent residents, Canadian citizens, Canadian permanent residents, eligible Visa Waiver Program travellers and passengers holding a B1/B2, C1/D, or D visa. APC had ceased to operate by 2022 with all kiosks removed.

Besides APC, certain low-risk travellers can also apply to enroll in Trusted Traveler Programs operated by U.S. Customs and Border Protection, such as Global Entry and NEXUS. Applicants must file an application, pay a registration fee, go through a background check and attend an interview. Once approved, in addition to using self-service kiosks just like APC, travellers may receive additional benefits such as TSA PreCheck.

=== Global Entry ===
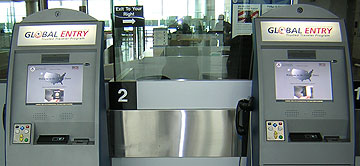
Global Entry kiosks

Global Entry is a program of the U.S. Customs and Border Protection service that allows pre-approved, low-risk travellers to receive expedited clearance upon arrival into the United States.

=== Mobile Passport Control ===
Mobile Passport Control allows select travellers at participating points of entry to enter their details and customs declarations, and take a photo on an iOS or Android app, before submitting this online. They can then receive expedited processing in a dedicated line at USCBP checkpoints. MPC is free of charge. Users must still be examined by a USCBP officer.

== See also ==
- Airport of Entry
- Entry/Exit System
- Iris Recognition Immigration System
- Port of entry
- Port Passenger Accelerated Service System (PORTPASS)
- Secure Electronic Network for Travelers Rapid Inspection (SENTRI)
