= Secunet Security Networks =

German information security and networking company

secunet Security Networks AG
- Type: Public
- Traded as: FWB: YSN; SDAX component
- ISIN: DE0007276503
- Industry: Cybersecurity
- Founded: 1997; 29 years ago in Essen, Germany
- Headquarters: Essen, Germany
- Area served: Worldwide
- Key people: Marc-Julian Siewert (CEO and chairman of the management board)
- Products: SINA
- Revenue: ▲€458.8 million (2025)
- Operating income: ▲€51.6 million (2025)
- Net income: ▲€33.3 million (2025)
- Total assets: ▲€410.7 million (2025)
- Total equity: ▲€167.0 million (2025)
- Number of employees: ▲1,302 (2025)
- Website: secunet.com
- Footnotes; Financials and employees as of 31 December 2025.

secunet Security Networks AG (known as Secunet) is a German cybersecurity company headquartered in Essen. It develops information-security products and services for public authorities, defence and security organisations, critical infrastructure operators and businesses. The company develops the SINA (Secure Inter-Network Architecture) secure-networking system, which was commissioned by the German Federal Office for Information Security (BSI) in 1999 and is used in government, security-cleared businesses and critical infrastructure.

Secunet was founded in 1997 as an independent company emerging from TÜV Mitte AG. Giesecke+Devrient acquired a majority stake in the company in 2004 and remains its majority shareholder. Secunet has been publicly traded since 1999, with its shares listed in the Prime Standard of the Frankfurt Stock Exchange. In 2025, the company reported revenue of €458.8 million.

== Products and services ==
With its products and services, Secunet primarily focuses on clients in the public administration and ministries, the healthcare sector, the defense and space sector as well as specifically security and police agencies.

=== Secure Networking ===
One of Secunet's premier products is the SINA (Secure Inter-Network Architecture) product line which was co-developed with Germany's Federal Office for Information Security (BSI). The SINA architecture forms the basis for Germany's classified information networks and is used in a broad range of public institutions in Germany and abroad. The architecture is accredited to the NATO and EU SECRET classifications and includes network encryptors and workstations as well as communication devices, such as encrypted phones.

=== Border Control ===
Secunet is the producer of EasyPASS, an automated border control system used at airports and border check points in Germany and a number of EU countries.

=== Healthcare ===
Germany's electronic healthcare infrastructure is partially based on Secunet products.
