= EasyPASS =

German automated border control system

Logo of the EasyPASS Program

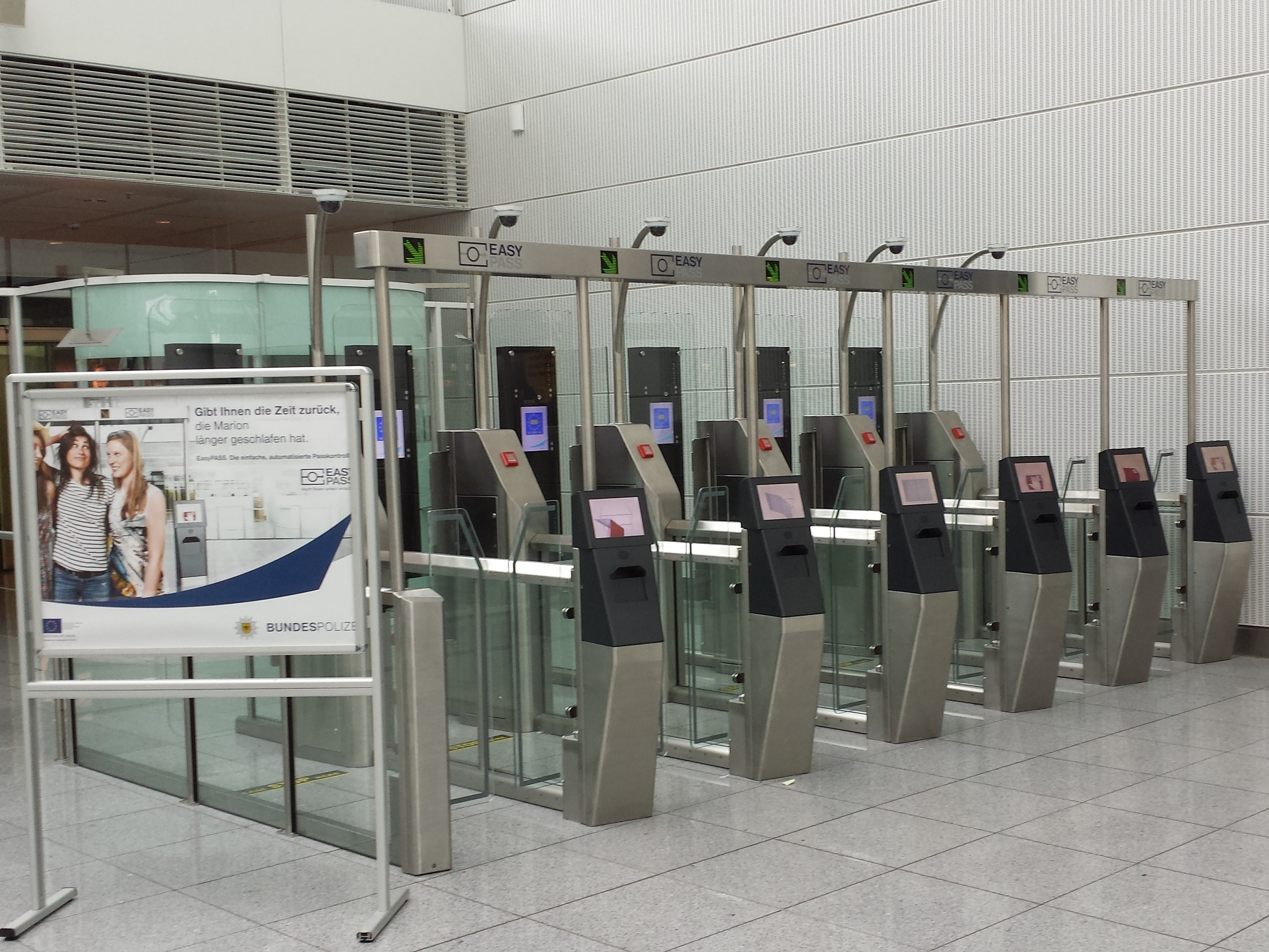
EasyPASS self-service gates at Munich Airport

EasyPASS is a German automated border control system for e-passports holders of certain nationalities who enter and leave Germany by air, which is operated by the German Federal Police. It is currently available at Frankfurt, Munich, Hamburg, Hannover, Düsseldorf, Stuttgart, Berlin Brandenburg and Cologne/Bonn Airports.

== Eligibility ==
EasyPASS is generally available on entry to any person above the age of 12 who fulfils one of the following criteria:

- Holders of e-passports issued by
  - (Europe) EU/EEA
  - Switzerland
- Holders of a national identity card issued by
  - Germany
- Holders of an e-passport issued by any country, who also hold a residence permit issued by:
  - Germany
- Holders of e-passports issued by
  - United States
  - Hong Kong
  - Taiwan
  - South Korea
  - United Kingdom
  - who are members of the EasyPASS Registered Traveler Program.

In addition to those who may use EasyPass upon entry and exit, the following may use it when exiting Germany:

- Holders of an e-passport issued by any country, who also hold a long stay D-Visa issued by:
  - Germany

Those able to use EasyPass by virtue of holding a German residence permit or long stay D-Visa must have their e-passports entered in the German Central Register of Foreigners, which is normally done automatically by the responsible immigration authority, but may be missing in the event of an administrative error.

== Function ==
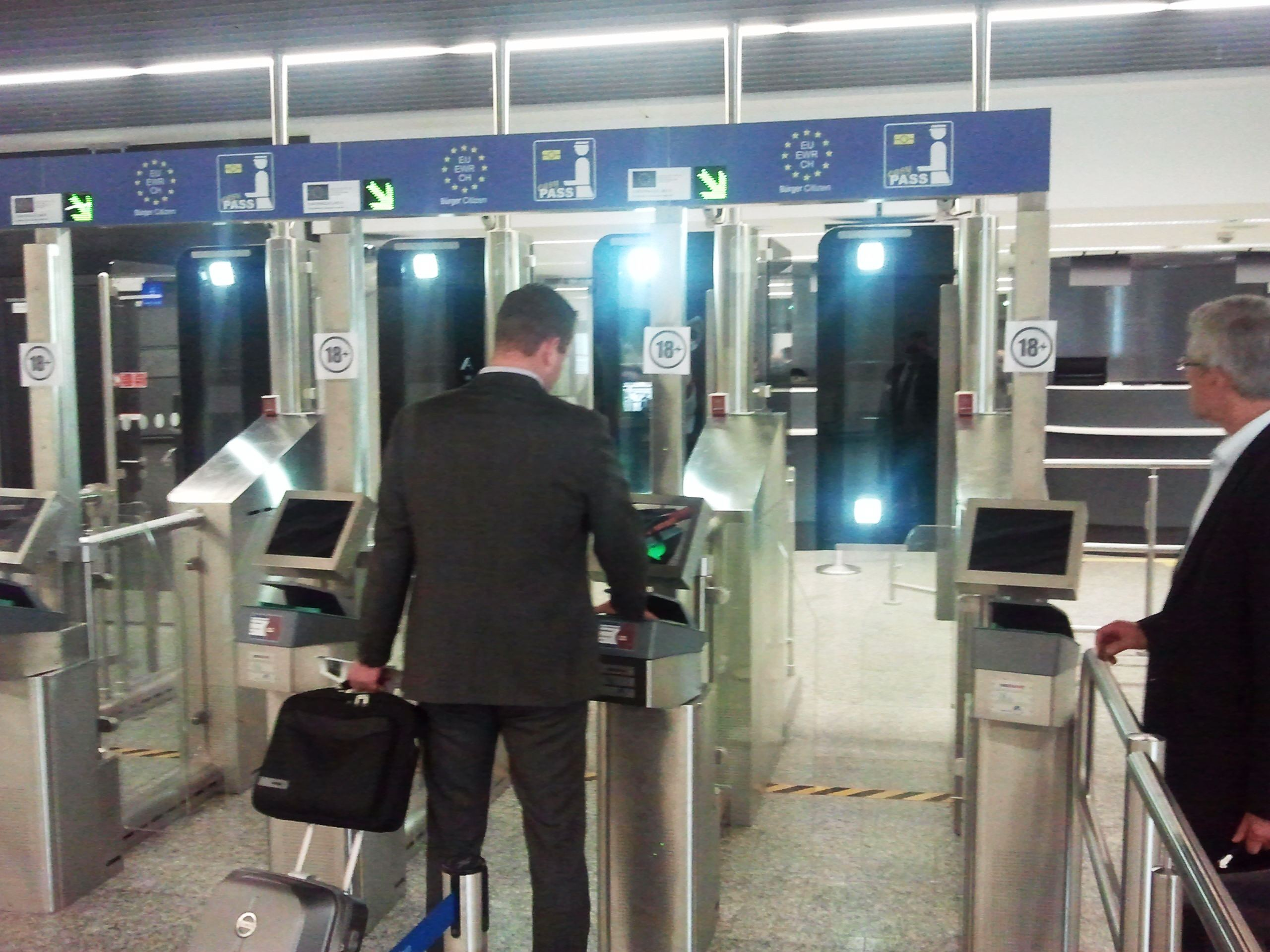

The system uses the data stored in the electronic chip of the e-passport, and compares this to the live image of the traveler passing through the gates.

The traveler places their travel document on the document reader prior to the first gate. The system, after carrying out checks on authenticity of the document, establishes the eligibility of the passenger to use the gates, in addition to checking the following databases, as would happen during a standard border check:

- INPOL
- Schengen Information System
- Interpol Stolen and Lost Travel Documents Database

If the check is successful, the first gate will open, allowing them to enter the holding pen, after which the gate will close behind them. A camera and a screen are mounted to the gate in front of them, showing the alignment of the passenger's head with the guide. After successful verification of their identity, the passenger be shown a green proceed arrow with the message "border check complete", after which the second gate opens, allowing them to proceed to the next part of the airport. If the verification of the passengers identity is not successful, they are shown a message to proceed to the border guard supervising the system for a manual check, after which the second gate opens, allowing them to speak with an officer. This will also happen to any traveler who is subject to the 90/180 day rule (ie. those using the Registered Traveler program), allowing their travel document to be stamped.

== Technology ==
The document readers at the entrance to the pen check travel documents' optical and electronic security features in accordance with the technical guidelines TR-03135 of the Federal Office for Information Security. The required certificates for accessing the electronic chips of the e-passports are managed through a "Terminal Control Center" (TCC). The TCC carries out all the cryptographic functions and key management for the connected eGates.

An intelligent camera system takes care of the comparison between the face of the passenger and their passport photo. Comprehensive factual recognition software is used for this purpose.

The eGates also have an "innovative Background Management System", with which all of the eGates can be remotely controlled and configured. The central pen is secured through the MiddlewareBiomiddle product.

For the configuration of the eGates there is a monitoring system available for the border control officials. The processes and outcomes of the eGates' biometric verification can be observed in real time.

The entire process lasts no longer than 18 seconds in an ideal case and allows for the faster processing of travellers in an airport border environment. The parallel operation of up to six "eGates" is possible, which greatly increases the processing capacity of the border.

== See also ==
- ePassport gates
- PARAFE
- SmartGate
