= Dominican passport =

Dominican passport may refer to:

- Dominican Republic passport, issued to citizens of the Dominican Republic
- Dominica passport, issued to citizens of the Commonwealth of Dominica
