= Exit and Entry Permit (China) =

Travel document

People's Republic of China Exit and Entry Permit 中华人民共和国出入境通行证
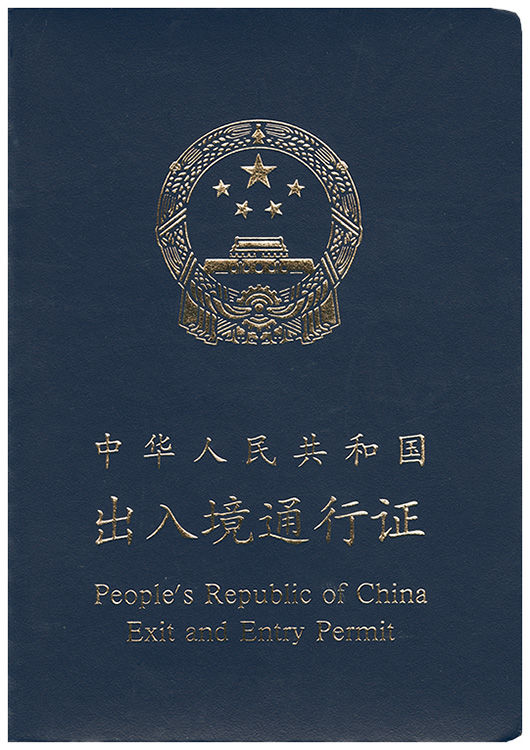
- Type: Travel document
- Issued by: (China) National Immigration Administration
- Purpose: Border trade and border tourism
- Eligibility: Chinese citizens
- Expiration: One year (multiple exit and entry); Three months (one exit and entry)

The People's Republic of China Exit and Entry Permit is a travel document issued by the National Immigration Administration of China to Chinese citizens for border trade, border tourism services, and border tourism.

For Chinese citizens engaged in border trade and border tourism services, an Exit and Entry Permit with a validity of one year for multiple entries or three months for single entry can be issued to them. For Chinese citizens participating in border tourism routes, an Exit and Entry Permit with a validity of three months for single entry can be issued to them.

== See also ==
- Chinese passport
- Chinese Travel Document
- Taiwan Travel Permit
- Hong Kong and Macao Travel Permit
- One-way Permit, to Hong Kong and Macau
- Mainland Travel Permit for Taiwan Residents
- Mainland Travel Permit for Hong Kong and Macao Residents
- Visit Permit for Residents of Macao to HKSAR
