= Nansha Ferry Port =

Ferry terminal in China

Coordinates: 22°46′22″N 113°36′25″E

Nansha Ferry Port (IATA: NSZ) is a ferry terminal on the shore of the Pearl river (aka Zhujiang River), in the Nansha District in the Southern China's Guangdong province, situated immediately north of Hong Kong. It includes a passenger terminal for high-speed ferries connecting the Nansha District, in mainland China, with Zhuhai and Hong Kong.

== Facilities and Infrastructure ==
- Terminals: The port hosts multiple specialized terminals, including those for containers and bulk cargo, along with Roll-on/Roll-off (Ro-Ro) terminals.
- Berths: Nansha Ferry Port boasts over 20 deep-water berths, accommodating large vessels, including ultra-large container ships (ULCS). The port has a quay length of 5,718 meters and is equipped with 16 container berths designed for ships with a capacity of up to 150,000 tons

== See also ==
- Chu Kong Passenger Transport Co., Ltd
