= Batam Harbour Bay Ferry Terminal =

Transport hub in Batam, Indonesia

Coordinates: 1.1539°N 103.9971°E

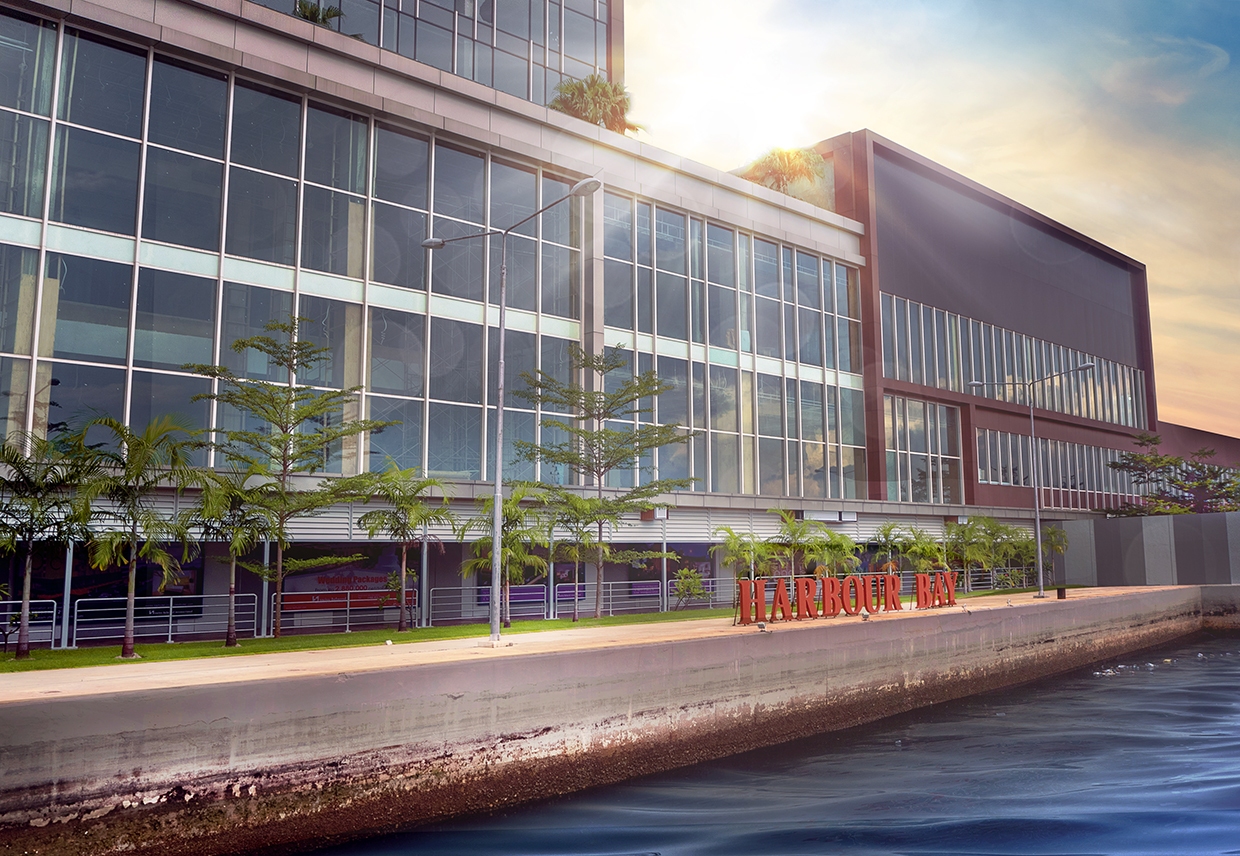
Batam Harbour Bay Ferry Terminal

Batam Harbour Bay Ferry Terminal is an international transport hub with shopping and restaurants in the center of Batam, Indonesia. Located within Nagoya, Jodoh, it is 10 minutes drive away from Batam Nagoya city.

Since its opening in 2006, it has been serving an average of 45,000 visitors coming from Singapore every month.

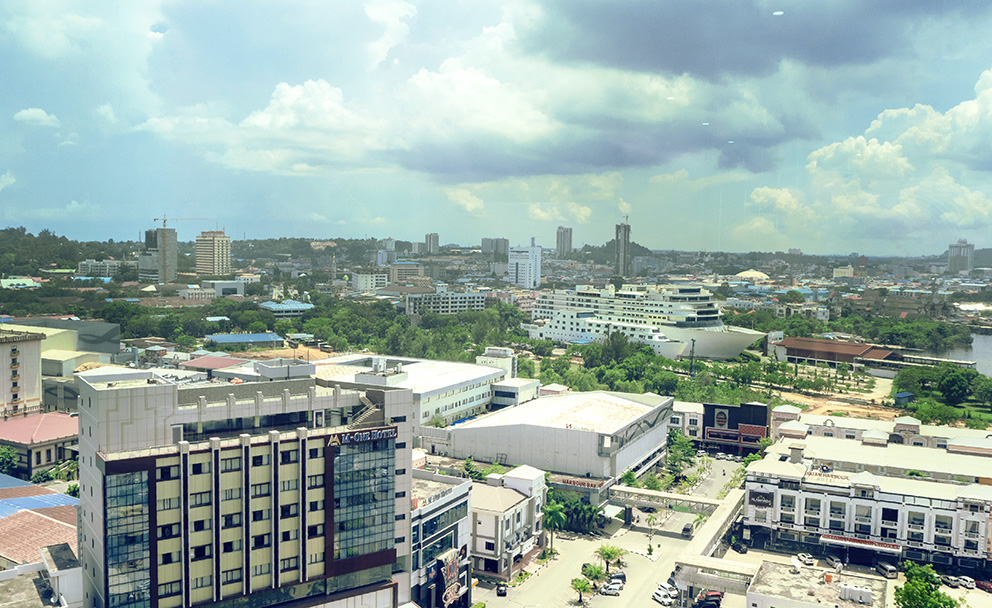
Batam Harbour Bay Downtown sky view

The ferry terminal is part of an integrated development by Citra Buana Prakarsa that includes a hotel, shopping, entertainment, and apartments near the terminal.

On 2014 September 5 and 6, it hosted the 7th Asean Jazz Festival sponsored by the Ministry of Tourism and Creative Economy of the Republic of Indonesia in collaboration with the Keppri Regional Government and Batam City Government. The Jazz Festival is held to increase foreign tourist visits.

== Ferry Schedule ==
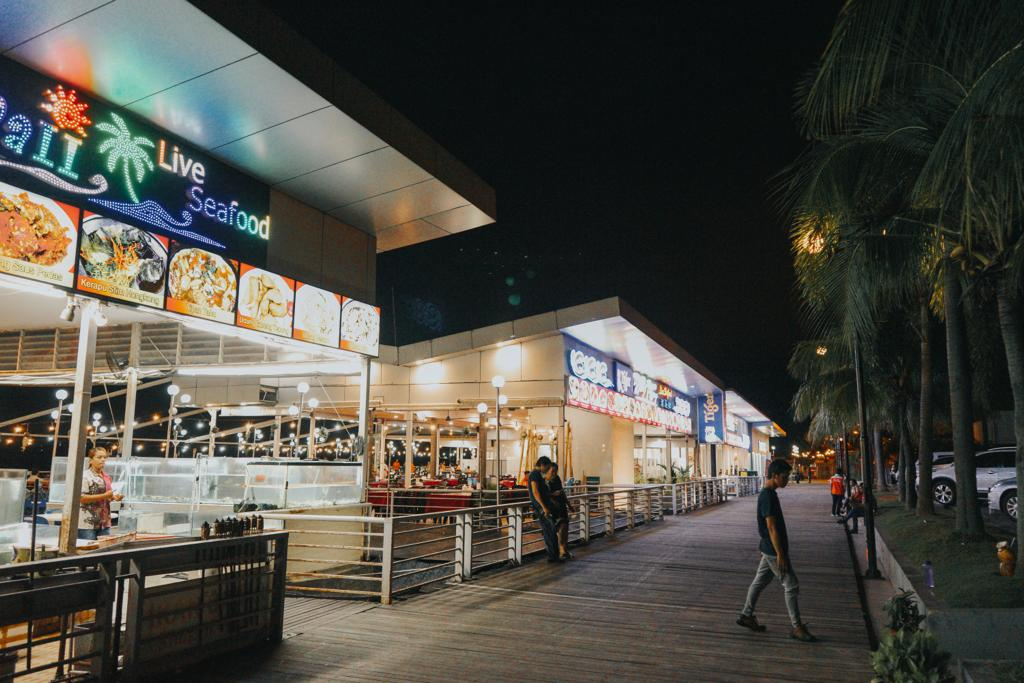
Seafood restaurant stretch in Batam Harbour Bay Downtown

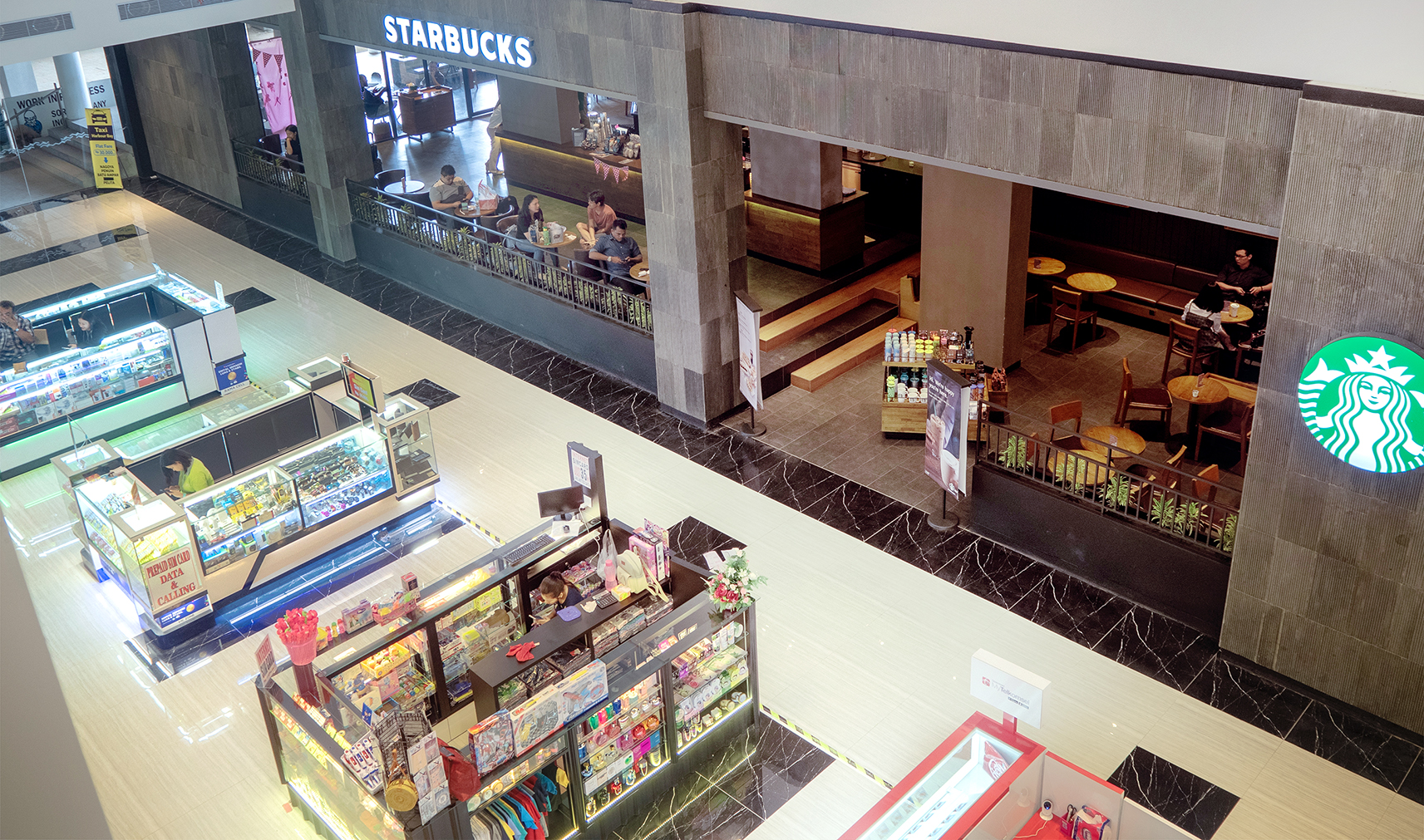
Batam Bayfront mall in Harbour Bay Ferry Terminal

There is 12 daily voyage between Harbour Front Singapore to Harbour Bay Batam. Each trip lasts approx 45 minutes.

The terminal is served by Horizon Fast Ferry and Batam Fast that commutes between Singapore Harbourfront and Batam.

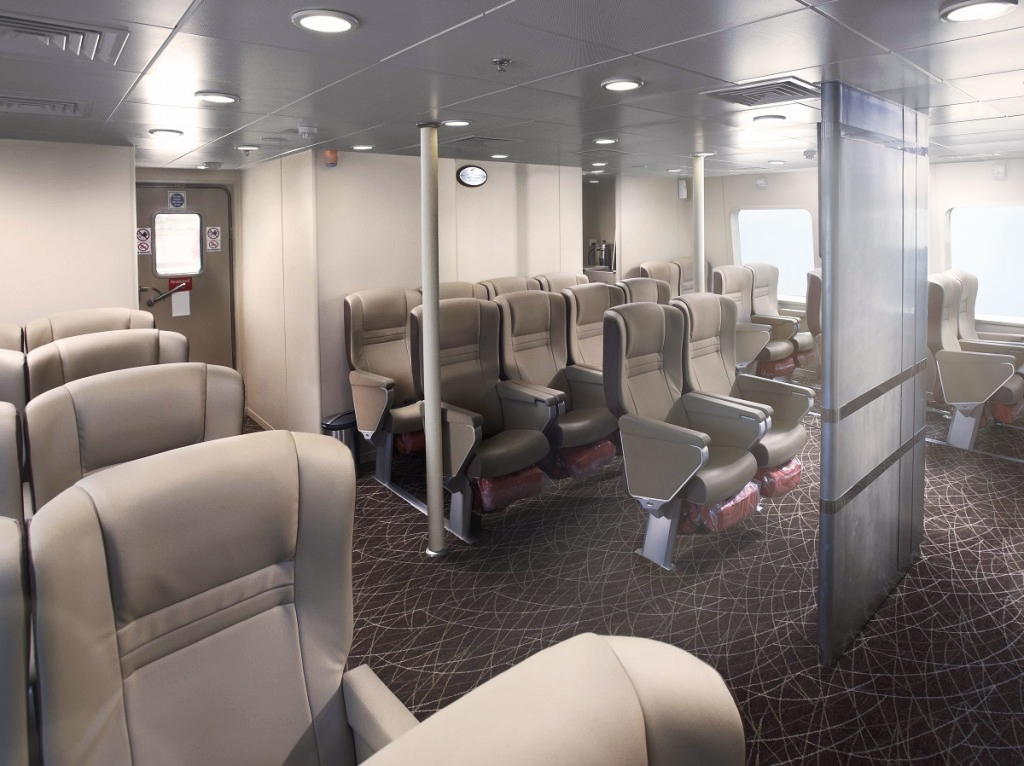
Horizon Fast Ferry interior

Service also runs to nearby Rimau Island Karimun via MV Oceana Ferry. or to Johor, Malaysia, Puteri Harbour Ferry Terminal, via Marine Hawk

== Facilities ==
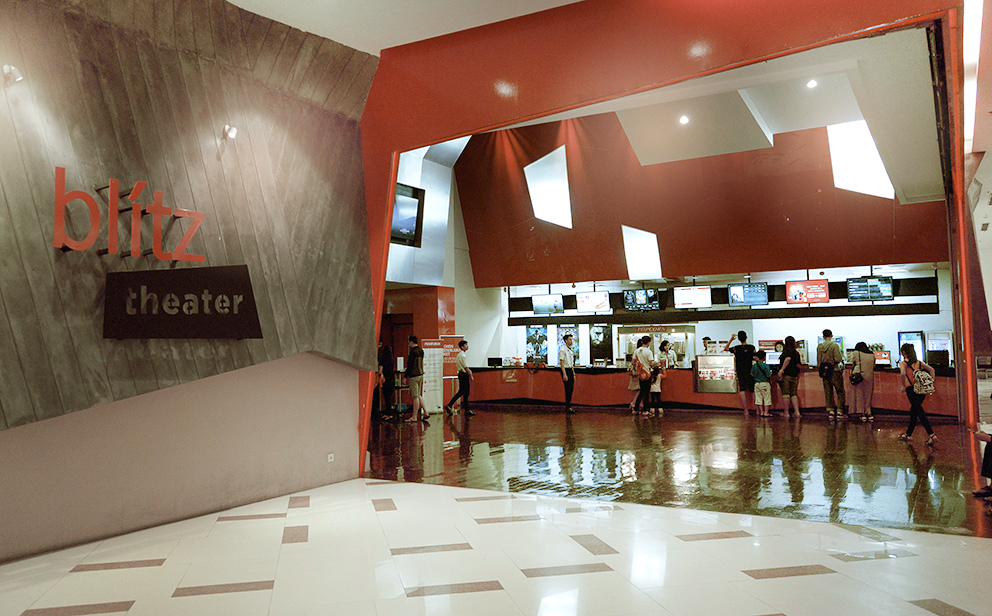
Harbour Bay mall cinema

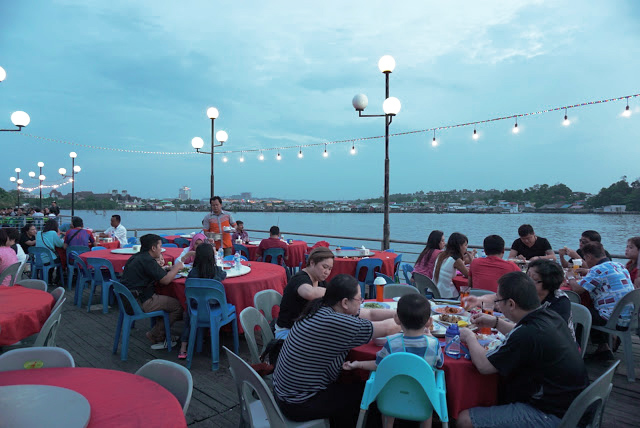
Several seafood restaurants located by the sea in Harbour Bay Terminal

Connected to the terminal is BayFront Mall, Harbour Bay Residences, a Marriott hotel and Harbour Bay Seafood area.

== Events ==
On 2014 September 5 and 6, it hosted the 7th Asean Jazz Festival sponsored by the Ministry of Tourism and Creative Economy of the Republic of Indonesia in collaboration with the Keppri Regional Government and Batam City Government. The Jazz Festival is held to increase foreign tourist visits.
