= Batam Center Ferry Terminal =

International ferry terminal in Indonesia

Coordinates: 1.130856°N 104.055225°E

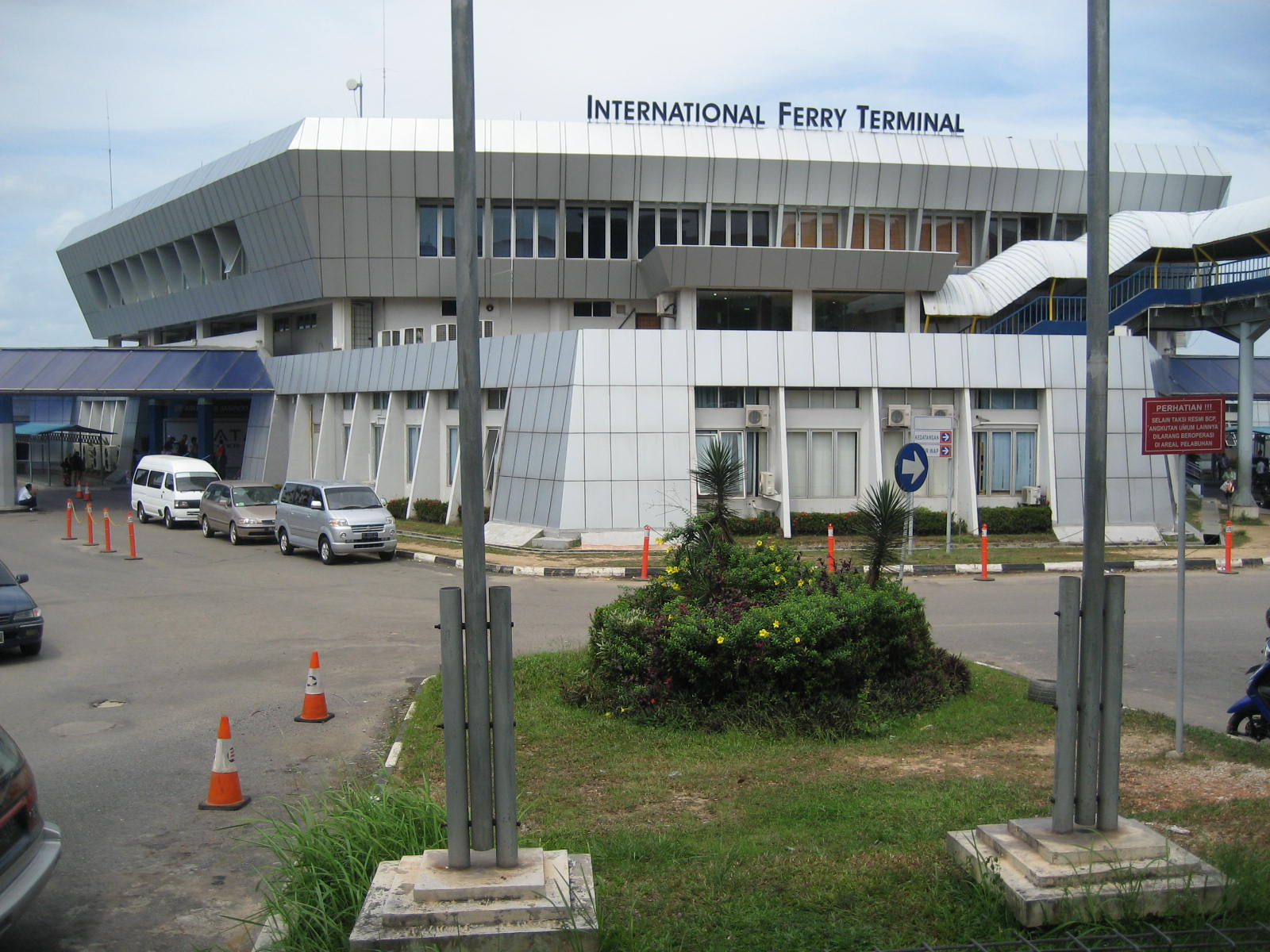

Batam Center Ferry Terminal is an international ferry terminal located in Teluk Tering, Batam, Riau Islands, Indonesia. The terminal mostly serves international routes to Singapore and Malaysia. It is located north of governmental buildings of Batam and landmarks such as the Grand Mosque of Batam and Engku Putri Fountain.
