= Visa requirements for Taiwanese citizens =

Administrative entry restrictions

Front cover of a Republic of China (Taiwan) passport

Visa requirements for citizens of the Republic of China (Taiwan) are administrative entry restrictions by the authorities of other states placed on nationals of the Republic of China (Taiwan) who have also established household registration in Taiwan. The law of Taiwan has various distinctions on its nationals' right of abode to its territory for those with or without household registration in Taiwan (NWHR and NWOHR).

The nationals with household registration (NWHRs), also referred to as citizens, are eligible to apply for National Identification Card with an ID number, and the ID number is imprinted on the passport's biodata page to signify the holder's status against the nationals without household registration (NWOHRs). As such, holders of passports with a National ID number can travel to more countries and territories without visas than those without.

In terms of the number of countries that its holders may visit without a visa, the Taiwan passport is one of five passports with the most improved rating globally from 2006 to 2016 (20+), but became one of seven passports with the most decreased rating globally from 2016 to 2026 (-4). From 2006 to 2026, the Taiwan passport improved 16 spots overall (16+).

As of 2026, NWHRs had visa-free or visa on arrival access to 134 countries and territories, ranking the Taiwanese passport 31st in the world, according to the Henley Passport Index.

== Visa requirements map ==
Map of where nationals with household registration (NWHRs) may enter. Republic of China (Taiwan) Visa not required / ESTA / eTA / eVisitor eVisa Visa available both on arrival or online Visa on arrival Taiwan compatriot permit or Chinese travel document required Visa required Admission refused

== Visa requirements ==
Many countries require passport validity of no less than 6 months and 1 or 2 blank pages.

Visa requirements for holders of normal passports travelling for tourist purposes:

Country	Visa requirement	Allowed stay	Notes (excluding departure fees)
Afghanistan	eVisa	30 days	e-Visa : Visitors must arrive at Kabul International (KBL).
Albania	Visa not required	90 days	90 days within any 6-months period.; Taiwanese citizens can use 「eGates」 to enter the country.
Algeria	Visa required		Travelers arriving by cruise ship do not need to apply for a visa in advance.Their visas are processed on board the ship.; Travelers on tours organized by an approved travel agency may obtain a visa on arrival for up to 30 days. The itinerary must include one of these southern provinces: Adrar, Béchar, Béni Abbès, Biskra, Bordj Badji Mokhtar, Djanet, Djelfa, El Bayadh, El M'Ghair, El Menia, El Oued, Ghardaïa, Illizi, In Guezzam, In Salah, Laghouat, M'Sila, Naâma, Ouargla, Ouled Djellal, Tamanrasset, Timimoun, Tindouf, Touggourt.
Andorra	Visa not required		
Angola	eVisa		Those who hold a visa approval certificate in advance can apply for a visa on arrival.
Antigua and Barbuda	Visa not required	30 days	
Argentina	Travel Certificate required		An Autorización de Viaje Electrónica (AVE) is available for Taiwanese passport with a valid entry authorization for the United States of America for a fee of US$200. The maximum duration is 3 months and is for tourism purposes only. Applying for one requires holding a regular passport with a validity period of at least 6 months, a record of at least 1 entry into the United States in the past 2 years, or holding a valid entry permit issued by the United States (ESTA or B2/J/B1/O/P<P1-P2-P3>/E/H-1B visa), and must hold a printed electronic travel authorization approval certificate; Additionally, passport holders can apply for a Travel Certificate issued by Argentina.
Armenia	eVisa	120 days	Maximum duration of 120 days, limited to sightseeing purposes. Entry from Yerevan Zvartnots International Airport (EVN) can also be applied for in local currency; The longest is 21 days.
Australia and territories	Electronic Travel Authority	90 days	90 days on each visit in 12-month period.; ROC passports without National ID numbers are not accepted unless the holder has permanent residency in another country. The longest is 3 months. For tourism or business purposes only, an Electronic Travel Authority (ETA) must be applied for in advance through the mobile application "AustralianETA", with a validity period of one year. Only a Republic of China passport holding a Republic of China national identity card number will be issued, and non registered citizens are not allowed to apply unless they have permanent residency in a third country.; May enter using SmartGate on arrival in Australia.; Ashmore and Cartier Islands - Special authorisation required.
Austria	Visa not required	90 days	90 days within any 180 day period in the Schengen Area.; Passport with National ID number required.
Azerbaijan	Visa required		
Bahamas	eVisa		
Bahrain	eVisa / Visa on arrival	14 days	Bahrain International Airport has 12 departure e-gates and 8 arrival e-gates with a total number of 20 e-gates. They require taking photos or fingerprints depending on the directions the machine prompts for passengers. Those currently eligible to use the e-gates are Bahrain citizens and residents with valid passports or valid ID Cards, citizens of GCC Member States with valid passports and visitors with valid multi-entry visas, after a successful first arrival through a physical counter (Does not apply to citizens of Belarus, Iran, Kosovo and North Korea)
Bangladesh	Visa on arrival	30 days	Visa-on-arrival fee is US$51; Passengers who are eligible to tourism who holds round-trip air tickets and accommodation booking validations or business purposes and hold round-trip air tickets with a confirmation letter from the Board of Investment of Bangladesh can apply for a visa on arrival.; Available at international airports in Dhaka, Chittagong, and Sylhet.
Barbados	Visa required		Passengers holding a cruise booking certificate can stay visa free for up to 24 hours.
Belarus	Visa required		Passengers who are not departing or transiting from Russia are eligible to apply for a visa upon arrival at Minsk National Airport and must provide proof of sufficient medical expenses.; The condition is that proof documents must be submitted 3 working days before the actual date of entry.; Visas are issued on arrival at the Minsk National Airport if the support.
Belgium	Visa not required	90 days	90 days within any 180 day period in the Schengen Area.; Passport with National ID number required.
Belize	Visa not required	30 days	
Benin	eVisa		Must have an international vaccination certificate.
Bhutan	eVisa		
Bolivia	Online Visa / Visa on arrival	30 days	
Bosnia and Herzegovina	Visa not required	90 days	90 days within any 6-month period.; Passport with National ID number required.
Botswana	eVisa		Due to the influence of the Chinese government, Botswana has removed the option for "Taiwan" and requires Taiwanese citizens to choose "China" in order to apply for an electronic visa.
Brazil	Visa required		Brazilian visas issued before 14 May 2014 were affixed on laissez-passers.
Brunei	Visa not required	14 days	Must be in possession of a regular passport with a validity period of at least 6 months.
Bulgaria	Visa not required	90 days	90 days within any 180 day period in the Schengen Area.; Passport with National ID number required.
Burkina Faso	eVisa	30 days	
Burundi	Visa on arrival	1 month	
Cambodia	eVisa / Visa on arrival	30 days	
Cameroon	eVisa		
Canada	Electronic Travel Authority	6 months	Passport with National ID number issued by the Ministry of Foreign Affairs required.; On arrival from land or overseas; eTA required when arriving by air.
Cape Verde	Visa on arrival		
Central African Republic	eVisa		Online Visa: https://paris.diplomatie.gouv.cf/services/24/visa-court-sejour/
Chad	eVisa		
Chile	Visa not required	90 days	
China (People's Republic of)	With Mainland Travel Permit for Taiwan Residents or Chinese Travel Document only, including airside transit		Holders of Mainland Travel Permit for Taiwan Resident can enter China via E-channel upon arrival.
Colombia	Online Visa		The fee varies depending on the visa type. If the country option is displayed in Spanish when filling out the form, please select 'Other Cases and TERRITORIES'.; Taiwanese citizens holding ROC passports or valid visas to the Schengen Area or the United States are eligible for visa-free entry.; San Andrés and Leticia - Visitors arriving at Gustavo Rojas Pinilla International Airport and Alfredo Vásquez Cobo International Airport must buy tourist cards on arrival.
Comoros	Visa on arrival	45 days	
Republic of the Congo	eVisa		Passengers holding VIP invitation letters do not require visas.; In April 2019 Congolese authorities announced a plan to introduce an electronic visa in August 2019. Visa applications can already be submitted online at the Republic of the Congo embassy in France website.
Democratic Republic of the Congo	eVisa	7 days	
Costa Rica	Visa not required	90 days	
Côte d'Ivoire	eVisa	3 months	e-Visa holders must arrive via Port Bouet Airport.
Croatia	Visa not required	90 days	90 days within any 180 day period in the Schengen Area.; Passport with National ID number required.
Cuba	eVisa	90 days	Since August 2024, visitors from most countries may obtain an e-Visa for 90 days. Extension is possible for another 90 days.; The electronic visa option requires selecting "Taiwan Province of China".
Cyprus	Visa not required	90 days	90 days within any 180 day period.; Passport with National ID number required.; Except for civilian areas, a road pass is required to enter the United Nations Buffer Zone in Cyprus.
Czech Republic	Visa not required	90 days	90 days within any 180 day period in the Schengen Area.; Passport with National ID number required.; After arriving in the Czech Republic, Taiwanese passport holders can use Easy Go to enter the country.
Denmark	Visa not required	90 days	90 days within any 180 day period in the Schengen Area.; Passport with National ID number required.
Djibouti	eVisa		
Dominica	Visa not required	180 days	
Dominican Republic	Visa not required		
Ecuador	Visa not Required	90 days	
Egypt	eVisa / Visa on arrival	30 days	
El Salvador	Visa required		
Equatorial Guinea	eVisa		
Eritrea	Visa required		Visa covers Asmara only; to travel in the rest of the country, a Travel Permit for Foreigners is required (20 Eritrean nakfa).
Estonia	Visa not required	90 days	90 days within any 180 day period in the Schengen Area.; Passport with National ID number required.
Eswatini	Visa not required	90 days	
Ethiopia	eVisa / Visa on arrival	up to 90 days	Visa on arrival is obtainable only at Addis Ababa Bole International Airport.; e-Visa holders must arrive via Addis Ababa Bole International Airport.; e-Visa is available for 30 or 90 days.
Fiji	Visa not required	4 months	Lau Province- Special permission required.
Finland	Visa not required	90 days	90 days within any 180 day period in the Schengen Area.; Passport with National ID number required.
France	Visa not required	90 days	90 days within any 180 day period in the Schengen Area.; Passport with National ID number required.; Special permission is required to travel to 'Clipperton Island'.; Taiwanese passport holders can use PARAFE to leave France.
Gabon	eVisa	90 days	e-Visa holders must arrive via Libreville International Airport.; New digital platform for issuing electronic tourist visas (e-Visas) in less than 48 hours, free of charge, for all applications submitted between July 1 and September 30, 2025.
Gambia	Visa not required	90 days	
Georgia	Admission refused		Only those invited to participate in international conferences, sports events, world-class events, etc. held in Georgia can apply for an exception, but they need to obtain a visa based on specific circumstances.
Germany	Visa not required	90 days	90 days within any 180 day period in the Schengen Area.; Passport with National ID number required.; After arriving in Germany, EasyPass can be used for entry.; The EasyPass system can be used in various parts of Germany, including 8 airports such as Frankfurt am Main, Munich, Cologne/Bonn, Düsseldorf, Berlin, Stuttgart, Hanover, and Hamburg. However, people who stay in Germany for a long time still need a visa or residence permit to use the EasyPass system.
Ghana	eVisa required		Ghana has brought online the official portal that will be used for electronic visa applications starting May 25, 2026.; The processing time for the eVisa is 96 hours, costing $260 for a single entry and $468 for a multiple entry visa, making it one of the most expensive eVisas. Fees are higher for faster processing.
Greece	Visa not required	90 days	90 days within any 180 day period in the Schengen Area.; Passport with National ID number required.; Mount Athos Special permit required (4 days: 25 euro for Orthodox visitors, 35 euro for non-Orthodox visitors, 18 euro for students). There is a visitors' quota: maximum 100 Orthodox and 10 non-Orthodox per day and women are not allowed.
Grenada	Visa required		Beginning on December 1, 2020, all travellers to Grenada will be required to complete an online application in order to receive a Pure Safe Travel Authorization Certificate to enter Grenada.; Cruise ship passengers of all nationalities can visit Grenada for up to 24 hours without a visa.
Guatemala	Visa not required	90 days	
Guinea	eVisa	90 days	
Guinea-Bissau	Visa on arrival	90 days	
Guyana	eVisa		According to Timatic, all other visitors that are not visa exempt can obtain an eVisa before departure.
Haiti	Visa not required	3 months	
Honduras	Visa not required	3 months	
Hungary	Visa not required	90 days	90 days within any 180 day period in the Schengen Area.; Passport with National ID number required.
Iceland	Visa not required	90 days	90 days within any 180 day period in the Schengen Area.; Passport with National ID number required.
India	eVisa	30 days	e-Visa holders must arrive via 32 designated airports (Note: Ahmedabad; Amritsar; Bagdogra; Bengaluru; Bhubaneswar; Chandigarh; Chennai; Coimbatore; Delhi; Gaya; Goa-Dabolim; Goa-Manohar; Guwahati; Hyderabad; Indore; Jaipur; Kannur; Kochi; Kolkata; Kozhikode; Lucknow; Madurai; Mangaluru; Mumbai; Nagpur; Port Blair; Pune; Surat; Thiruvananthapuram; Tiruchirappalli; Varanasi; Visakhapatnam) or 5 designated seaports. (Note: Chennai; Cochin; Mormugao; Mumbai; Mangalore); An Indian e-Tourist Visa may only be obtained twice within 1 calendar year.; Foreigners of Pakistani origin or who hold a Pakistani Passport are not eligible for an e-Visa. Foreigners who are not Pakistani nationals, but whose parents or grandparents (either paternal or maternal) were born in, or were permanent residents in Pakistan, are also not eligible for an e-Visa.; Protected Area Permit (PAP) required for all of Arunachal Pradesh, Manipur, Mizoram and parts of Himachal Pradesh, Jammu and Kashmir and Uttarakhand.; Restricted Area Permit (RAP) required for all of Andaman and Nicobar Islands and Lakshadweep and parts of Sikkim. Some of these requirements are occasionally lifted for a year.
Indonesia	e-VOA / Visa on arrival	30 days	From October 2026, Taiwanese passport holders exempt from visa-on-arrival fees.
Iran	eVisa	30 days	Tourist purpose: single trip from the 15th to the 30th; The maximum duration for a single business purpose is 14 days, limited to processing at designated ports.; Kish Island - No visa required for 14 days.
Iraq	eVisa		
Ireland	Visa not required	90 days	
Israel	Electronic Travel Authorization	90 days	Entry refused by certain Muslim countries due to Arab league boycott of Israel if evidence of travel to Israel; Passport with National ID number required.; Underof Zone and Ghajar are restricted areas, therefore access is restricted.
Italy	Visa not required	90 days	90 days within any 180 day period in the Schengen Area.; Passport with National ID number required.; After arriving in Italy, Taiwanese passport holders can use eGates to enter the country.; The eGates system can be used at 20 airports in Italy.
Jamaica	Affidavit of Identity required		ROC passports are not recognized.; Must hold an Affidavit of Identity issued by Jamaica.; citizens of Taiwan with an "Affadivit of Identity" traveling as tourists may obtain a visa on arrival.
Japan	Visa not required	90 days	Passport with National ID number required.; After arriving in Japan, J-BIS can be used for entry.
Jordan	eVisa / Visa on arrival		Visa can be obtained upon arrival, it will cost a total of 40 JOD, obtainable at most international ports of entry and land border crossings. (except King Hussein/Allenby Bridge)
Kazakhstan	Visa required		Kazakhstan has cancelled the electronic visa application for Taiwanese citizens. Taiwanese citizens must apply for a visa from the Kazakh embassy or consulate before entering Kazakhstan.; Closed cities - Special permission required for the town of Baikonur and surrounding areas in Kyzylorda Oblast, and the town of Gvardeyskiy near Almaty.
Kenya	Electronic Travel Authority		Taiwanese citizens can still apply for eTA to enter Kenya.
Kiribati	Admission refused		Due to influence of the Chinese government, Kiribati no longer recognizes Taiwanese passports and therefore does not issue visas to Taiwanese citizens (for business and tourism). This means that Taiwanese citizens will not be able to enter Kiribati.
North Korea	Visa required		To enter for tourism purposes, one must first obtain authorization issued by a local travel agency in North Korea.; Tourists are not allowed to leave North Korea outside of the capital Pyongyang. Special permission is required to travel to other areas, and tourists can only leave the capital with the accompaniment of government guides (cannot move independently).; The Korean Demilitarized Zone is a restricted area, therefore access is restricted.
South Korea	Electronic Travel Authorization	90 days	Taiwanese citizens can enter South Korea as a short term visit (e.g., tours, visiting relatives or friends, attending simple meetings) up to 90 days without a visa. They must have an onward or return ticket. It is illegal to work on a tourist visa, whether as a teacher or in any other capacity.; Taiwanese passport holders must be in possession of a Korea Electronic Travel Authorization (K-ETA) to enter Korea visa-free. They can complete their K-ETA application up to 24 hours before boarding their flight and it will be valid for 3 years from the date of approval. There is a small, non-refundable charge.; Taiwanese passport holders are exempt from K-ETA requirements until end of 2026.; After arriving in South Korea, Taiwanese passport holders can use the Smart Entry Service (SeS) to enter the country.
Kuwait	Visa required		Nationals of most countries who hold a valid visa or residence permit from the United States, the Schengen Area, or the United Kingdom are eligible to apply for a simplified Kuwait e-Visa. The supporting document (visa or residence permit) must be valid for at least 6 months at the time of application.; The Kuwait e-Visa may be issued as a single or multiple-entry visa, with each stay allowed for a maximum of 30 days. The e-Visa itself can be valid for up to 1 year, depending on the applicant's eligibility and the type of visa issued.
Kyrgyzstan	eVisa		e-Visa holders must arrive via Manas International Airport or Osh Airport or through land crossings with China (at Irkeshtam and Torugart), Kazakhstan (at Ak-jol, Ak-Tilek, Chaldybar, Chon-Kapka), Tajikistan (at Bor-Dobo, Kulundu, Kyzyl-Bel) and Uzbekistan (at Dostuk).; Visa on arrival is also available for those with pre-arranged landing visa invitation.; Invitation letter issued by Kyrgyz travel agency or other inviting units.
Laos	eVisa / Visa on arrival	30 days	18 (Note: Savannakhet Airport; Lanetoui - Mengkang (China); Meuangmom - Wan Pong (Myanmar); Banvang - Ban Khok Phai (Thailand); Namngeun - Huay Kon (Thailand); Paksan - Bueng Kan (Thailand); Paktaphan - Pak Saeng (Thailand); Pangmon - Ban Huak (Thailand); Phoudou (Thailand); Dak ta ock - Nam Giang (Vietnam); La Lai (Vietnam); Namkan (Vietnam); Namphao - Cau Treo (Vietnam); Namsoy - Na Meo (Vietnam); Naphao - Cha Lo (Vietnam); Pahang - Long Sap (Vietnam); Panghok - Tây Trang (Vietnam); Phoukeua - Bo Y (Vietnam)) of the 33 border crossings are only open to regular visa holders.; e-Visa may be used to enter Laos through the Luang Prabang, Pakse and Vientiane international airports, 3 Thai-Lao Friendship Bridges (Note: Vientiane (Friendship Bridge 1); Savannakhet (Friendship Bridge 2); Bokeo (Friendship Bridge 4)), in Boten (road and railroad), and in Vientiane (at Khamsavath railway station).; Visa on arrival is available at the Luang Prabang, Pakse and Vientiane international airports, 4 Thai-Lao Friendship Bridges (Note: Vientiane (Friendship Bridge 1); Savannakhet (Friendship Bridge 2); Khammouane (Friendship Bridge 3); Bokeo (Friendship Bridge 4)) and 7 border crossings. (Note: Nongnokkheane - Trapeang Kriel (Cambodia); Boten - Bo han (China); Golden Triangle/Samliemkham (Thailand); Khamsavath railway station (Thailand); Namheuang - Ban Na Kraseng (Thailand); Vang tao - Chongmek (Thailand); Dansavan - Lao Bảo (Vietnam))
Latvia	Visa not required	90 days	90 days within any 180 day period in the Schengen Area.; Passport with National ID number required.
Lebanon	Visa required		Pre examination system Tourist visa on arrival, up to 30 days, requires first sending an email to the Jordanian representative office to handle the tourist visa on arrival, limited to entry from Beirut International Airport (BEY), and the passport must be valid for at least one month upon arrival.
Lesotho	eVisa		
Liberia	eVisa		Starting March 11, 2025, international travelers can apply for an electronic visa on arrival to visit Liberia, but if there is a Liberian embassy in one's country, the traveler is required to apply for a visa directly at the embassy and not through this portal.
Libya	eVisa		
Liechtenstein	Visa not required	90 days	90 days within any 180 day period in the Schengen Area.; Passport with National ID number required.
Lithuania	Visa not required	90 days	90 days within any 180 day period in the Schengen Area.; Passport with National ID number required.
Luxembourg	Visa not required	90 days	90 days within any 180 day period in the Schengen Area.; Passport with National ID number required.
Madagascar	eVisa / Visa on arrival		
Malawi	eVisa / Visa on arrival	90 days	
Malaysia	Visa not required	30 days	After arriving in Malaysia, Taiwanese passport holders can use Autogate to enter the country.; Sabah and Sarawak - Malaysian Visa / eNTRI required. These states have their own immigration authorities but same visa policies applies as West Malaysia. However a single entry Visa / eNTRI is valid for multiple entry/exit between the territories inside Malaysia.
Maldives	Free visa on arrival	30 days	With the exception of the capital Malé, tourists are generally prohibited from visiting non-resort islands without the express permission of the Government of Maldives.
Mali	Visa required		
Malta	Visa not required	90 days	90 days within any 180 day period in the Schengen Area.; Passport with National ID number required.
Marshall Islands	Visa not required	90 days	
Mauritania	eVisa		Available at Nouakchott–Oumtounsy International Airport.
Mauritius	Visa on arrival	60 days	Free visa on arrival.
Mexico	Visa required		No visa is required for passengers with a valid visa or show proof of permanent residence of Canada, Japan, USA, United Kingdom or a Schengen Member State.
Micronesia	Visa not required	30 days	
Moldova	Admission refused		Taiwanese citizens are not allowed to enter and transit.
Monaco	Visa not required		
Mongolia	eVisa	30 days	
Montenegro	Visa not required	90 days	Passport with National ID number required.
Morocco	Visa required		Morocco has resumed visa applications for Taiwanese citizens on September 21st.
Mozambique	eVisa / Visa on arrival	30 days	
Myanmar	eVisa	28 days	e-Visa holders must arrive via Yangon, Nay Pyi Taw or Mandalay airports or via land border crossings with Thailand — Tachileik, Myawaddy and Kawthaung or India — Rih Khaw Dar and Tamu.; e-Visa available for both tourism (allowed stay is 28 days) or business (allowed stay is 70 days) purposes.
Namibia	eVisa		Starting from September 22, 2023, Republic of China passport holders can apply for a Holiday Visa online through the website of the Ministry of the Interior, Immigration, and Security of the host country https://eservices.mhaiss.gov.na/holidayvisa-services .
Nauru	Visa required		
Nepal	Online Visa / Visa on arrival	30 days	Business purposes and obtain a license from the Nepalese Ministry of Industry for a maximum of 5 years.
Netherlands	Visa not required	90 days	90 days within any 180 day period in the Schengen Area.; Passport with National ID number required.; Taiwanese citizens can apply for a 'Security Check Time Slot' to leave the Netherlands.
New Zealand	Electronic Travel Authority	3 months	Taiwan standard passport with National ID number required; otherwise, visa required.; Taiwan diplomatic and official passports are unacceptable, and visas will not be endorsed in them.; International Visitor Conservation and Tourism Levy must be paid upon requesting an Electronic Travel Authority.; Holders of an Australian Permanent Resident Visa or Resident Return Visa may be granted a New Zealand Resident Visa on arrival permitting indefinite stay (pursuant to the Trans-Tasman Travel Arrangement), subject to meeting character requirements and obtaining an Electronic Travel Authority prior to departure. Such travellers are not required to pay the International Visitor Conservation and Tourism Levy.; Taiwanese citizens can use eGate to enter and exit New Zealand.
Nicaragua	eVisa		Citizens of all other countries are eligible to obtain an electronic visa in advance.; The country launched the electronic visa portal in March 2026.
Niger	Visa required		Holders of a pre-approved confirmation from the National Police may obtain a visa on arrival (flyer visa) upon arrival at Niamey. The passport will be compounded for 1 working day and the traveler is required to appear at the Director General of Immigration the next working day to register and collect their passport.; Transit without a visa is available to holders of onward tickets for a maximum transit of 24 hours.
Nigeria	eVisa		
North Macedonia	Visa not required	90 days	Passport with National ID number required.
Norway	Visa not required	90 days	90 days within any 180 day period in the Schengen Area.; Passport with National ID number required.; Go to Jan Mayen Permit issued by the local police required for staying for less than 24 hours and permit issued by the Norwegian police for staying for more than 24 hours.; Anyone of any nationality may live and work freely in Svalbard per the Svalbard Treaty.
Oman	Visa not required / eVisa	14 days / 30 days	
Pakistan	Visa required		Extra registration with the Immigration Head Office of Pakistan in Hong Kong is required in advance of arrival.
Palau	Visa not required	90 days	
Panama	Visa not required	90 days	
Papua New Guinea	eVisa	60 days	Available at Gurney Airport (Alotau), Mount Hagen Airport, Port Moresby Airport and Tokua Airport (Rabaul).
Paraguay	Visa not required	90 days	
Peru	Visa not required	183 days	
Philippines	Visa not required	14 days	Visa exemption applies for tourism purposes only. Effective until June 30, 2027.; eVisa is still available for short-term visits not exceeding 30 days.; Visa required for longer tourism trips or other travel purposes.
Poland	Visa not required	90 days	90 days within any 180 day period in the Schengen Area.; Passport with National ID number required.
Portugal	Visa not required	90 days	90 days within any 180 day period in the Schengen Area.; Passport with National ID number required.; Taiwanese citizens holding valid biometric passports (provided they entered the Schengen area through Portugal and did not overstay) can use the RAPID4ALL electronic gate to leave the country. RAPID4ALL e-gates are available at Faro Airport, Lisbon Airport Terminal 1, Madeira Airport, Ponta Delgada Airport, and Porto Airport.
Qatar	eVisa / Visa on arrival	30 days	Available at Hamad International Airport
Romania	Visa not required	90 days	90 days within any 180 day period in the Schengen Area.; Passport with National ID number required.
Russia	eVisa	30 days	The scope of application covers the entire territory of Russia, with a visa validity period of 60 days and a stay period of 16 days. The visa fee is $40, and children under 6 years old are free of charge.; Several closed cities and regions in Russia require special authorization.; For visiting Crimea, visas issued by Russia are required.; Russia signed the "Shared Values Visa" law on August 19, 2024, aimed at simplifying the residence permits for citizens of countries that do not conform to Russia's traditional spirit and values. This means that one can obtain a three-month temporary residency without passing the exam. The focus of this law is to simplify the residence permit for foreign citizens with traditional Russian spirit and values. As long as they comply with Russian values, foreign citizens do not need to prove their knowledge of Russian language, Russian history, or Russian law (without examination), and can obtain a temporary residence permit for three months. By simplifying the process, more people can be attracted to settle in Russia, and these foreign citizens must come from countries that oppose Russian values. This list applies to 47 regions, including Taiwan.
Rwanda	eVisa / Visa on arrival	30 days	
Saint Kitts and Nevis	Electronic Travel Authorisation	3 months	
Saint Lucia	Visa not required	6 weeks	
Saint Vincent and the Grenadines	Visa not required	6 months	
Samoa	Visa not required	60 days	
San Marino	Visa not required		
São Tomé and Príncipe	eVisa		
Saudi Arabia	eVisa / Visa on arrival	90 days	Restricted tourism and Islamic sub pilgrimage purposes; Holding a business or tourist visa issued by the United States, the United Kingdom, or a Schengen area country, and the visa is valid, used, and stamped, can apply for a visa on arrival. It is necessary to travel on airlines such as Saudi Arabian Airlines (SV), Flyadeal (F3), Saudigulf (6S), or Nasir (XY).; Special access permission is required to travel to Mecca and Medina. Non Muslims and followers of the Ahmadiyya religious movement are strictly prohibited from entering the country.
Senegal	Visa required		
Serbia	Travel Certificate required		Travel certificate issued on a separate piece of paper.; Holders of passports of the Taiwan can apply for a short-stay visa (visa C) in person at the relevant diplomatic-consular mission or through the Welcome to Serbia portal.If the request for issuing a visa for a short stay (visa C) is submitted in person, the visa is issued on the same day, and if it is submitted online, it is necessary to make an appointment at the competent diplomatic-consular mission of the Republic of Serbia to collect the visa.; It is necessary to apply for an entry permit letter from the Serbian embassy or consulate abroad in advance. The permit letter is not attached to the passport and can be used for a maximum stay of 90 days
Seychelles	Electronic Border System	3 months	Application can be submitted up to 30 days before travel.; Visitors must upload a reservation confirmation(s) for each visitor's location of stay in Seychelles.; Yellow fever vaccination certificate is required if coming from endemic countries.; Payment of the fee (EUR 10) by credit or debit card.; Valid for one journey only and it expires once exit the country.
Sierra Leone	eVisa		
Singapore	Visa not required	30 days	Holders of passports without National ID numbers are required to hold a valid Taiwanese re-entry permit.; After arriving in Singapore, Taiwanese passport holders can use the Immigration and Checkpoints Authority (ICA) to enter the country.
Slovakia	Visa not required	90 days	90 days within any 180 day period in the Schengen Area.; Passport with National ID number required.
Slovenia	Visa not required	90 days	90 days within any 180 day period in the Schengen Area.; Passport with National ID number required.
Solomon Islands	Visa required	3 months	Since 24 April 2025, Solomon Islands have cancelled the visa on arrival for Taiwanese passport holders.
Somalia	Visa required		In April 2025, Somalia announced that passengers with a Taiwanese passport were not allowed to enter or transit, and Timatic shows that Taiwanese citizens were unable to enter Somalia at the time. In June 2025, however, Somalia lifted its ban on visitors entering with Taiwanese passports, and Timatic shows that Taiwanese citizens must have a valid visa issued by Somalia.
South Africa	Visa required		Visas issued free of charge.
South Sudan	eVisa		Obtainable online.; Printed visa authorization must be presented at the time of travel.; When traveling online, a printed visa authorization letter must be presented.
Spain	Visa not required	90 days	90 days within any 180 day period in the Schengen Area.; Passport with National ID number required.
Sri Lanka	Visa Required		A letter from sponsor in Sri Lanka is required for visa application.
Sudan	Visa required		All foreigners traveling more than 25 kilometers outside of Khartoum must obtain a travel permit.; Go to Darfur Separate travel permit is required.; Mandatory Police Registration for all nationalities is required within 24 hours of arrival.
Suriname	Visa not required	90 days	An entrance fee of USD 50 or EUR 50 must be paid online prior to arrival.; Multiple entry e-Visa is also available.
Sweden	Visa not required	90 days	90 days within any 180 day period in the Schengen Area.; Passport with National ID number required.
Switzerland	Visa not required	90 days	90 days within any 180 day period in the Schengen Area.; Passport with National ID number required.
Syria	eVisa		
Tajikistan	eVisa		Go to Gorno-Badakhshan Autonomous Province OIVR permit required (15+5 Tajikistani Somoni) and another special permit (free of charge) is required for Lake Sarez.
Tanzania	eVisa / Visa on arrival		
Thailand	Visa not required	60 days	After entering Thailand, Taiwanese passport holders can use the automated passport control (APC) system to exit the country.
Timor-Leste	Visa on arrival	30 days	
Togo	eVisa	15 days	
Tonga	Visa required		
Trinidad and Tobago	eVisa		
Tunisia	Visa required		
Turkey	eVisa	30 days	
Turkmenistan	eVisa		Closed cities - A special permit, issued prior to arrival by Ministry of Foreign Affairs, is required if visiting the following places: Atamurat, Cheleken, Dashoguz, Serakhs and Serhetabat.; Turkmenistan has launched an electronic visa application website on October 1, 2026.
Tuvalu	Visa not required	90 days	
Uganda	eVisa		
Ukraine	eVisa		Ukraine resumed its eVisa service in February 2025.; Taiwanese citizens need to select the "China (Taiwan)" option to apply for an electronic visa.; The Ministry of Foreign Affairs urges all Taiwanese citizens to avoid traveling to Ukraine to ensure their safety.
United Arab Emirates	Visa required		May apply using 'Smart service'.; The longest transit electronic visa is 96 hours. Taiwanese passport holders must travel the entire journey on the Emirates airline, with a transit time exceeding 4 hours.; Passengers on all international airlines may enter the United Arab Emirates for 96 hours after obtaining a transit visa at the airport.; All travellers in transit are exempt from entry fees for the first 48 hours; this short time may be extended for up to 96 hours for a fee of 50 AED.; Taiwan citizens can obtain online visas in two ways: Smart Service Visitors may obtain a visa online through Smart Service for Dubai or other emirates.Passengers must have a printed Online Visa confirmation. Each nationality has specific visa conditions based on diplomatic relations, the purpose of visit, and intended duration of stay. Airline visa Visitors may obtain a visa online through an airline if they are arriving on Air Arabia, Air Astana, Emirates, Etihad(and Air Baltic, Air Serbia, flydubai, Turkish Airlines and Indigo Airlines.
United Kingdom	Electronic Travel Authorisation	6 months	ETA valid for 2 years when issued.; Passport with National ID number required.; After arriving in the UK, ePassport gates can be used for entry.
United States	Visa Waiver Program	90 days	ESTA is valid for 2 years from the date of issuance.; ESTA is also required when entering the country by cruise ship or land.; A Form I-94 is required for entry into the United States by land. It carries a $30 fee and can be obtained either online or upon arrival.; Visa required for nationals of VWP countries who have travelled or been present in Iran, Iraq, Libya, North Korea, Somalia, Sudan, Syria or Yemen at any time on or after 1 March 2011 or Cuba at any time on or after 12 January 2021, or nationals of VWP countries who are also nationals of Iran, Iraq, North Korea, Sudan or Syria. Exceptions apply if the travel was in military or diplomatic service of the VWP country.; After arriving in the United States, Global Entry can be used for entry.; A passport with a Republic of China national ID number is required. Otherwise, the DS-232 form must be filled out to apply for a visa.
Uruguay	Visa required		
Uzbekistan	eVisa		
Vanuatu	Visa not required	30 days	
Vatican City	Visa not required		
Venezuela	Admission refused		Due to influence of the Chinese government, Venezuela no longer recognizes Taiwanese passports and therefore does not issue visas to Taiwanese citizens (for business and tourism). This means that Taiwanese citizens will not be able to enter Venezuela.
Vietnam	eVisa		Direct flight traveling to Phú Quốc can be exempted from a visa for 30 days.
Yemen	eVisa		Special permission needed for travel outside Sanaa or Aden.; Passengers can transit without visa with a confirmed onward ticket for a flight to a third country within 24 hours. They must stay in the international transit area of the airport and have documents required for the next destination.; Yemen has launched an electronic visa system for visitors who meet specific criteria (groups of 10 or more, business travel, transit, etc.).
Zambia	eVisa		
Zimbabwe	eVisa		

== Other Visa requirements ==
=== APEC Business Travel Card ===
Full members of the scheme Transitional members (United States, Canada)

Holders of an APEC Business Travel Card (ABTC) travelling on business do not require a visa to the following countries:

- Australia^{2}
- Brunei^{2}
- Chile^{2}
- Hong Kong^{4}
- Indonesia^{4}
- Japan^{2}
- Malaysia^{2}
- Mexico^{1}
- New Zealand^{2}
- Papua New Guinea^{4}
- Peru^{2}
- Philippines^{4}
- Russia^{3}
- Singapore^{4}
- South Korea^{2}
- Thailand^{2}
- Vietnam^{4}

_{1 - Up to 180 days}
_{2 - Up to 90 days}
_{3 - Up to 90 days in a period of 180 days}
_{4 - Up to 60 days}

Although Taiwan is a member of this program, its nationals are also not allowed to use ABTC to enter China, instead they are required to use Taiwan Compatriot Permits.

The card must be used in conjunction with a passport and has the following advantages:

- No need to apply for a visa or entry permit to APEC countries, as the card is treated as such (except by Canada and United States)
- Undertake legitimate business in participating economies
- Expedited border crossing in all member economies, including transitional members

=== Vaccination ===
Many African countries, including Angola, Benin, Burkina Faso, Cameroon, Central African Republic, Chad, Democratic Republic of the Congo, Republic of the Congo, Côte d'Ivoire, Equatorial Guinea, Gabon, Ghana, Guinea, Liberia, Mali, Mauritania, Niger, Rwanda, São Tomé and Príncipe, Senegal, Sierra Leone, Uganda, Zambia require all incoming passengers to have a current International Certificate of Vaccination. Some other countries require vaccination only if the passenger is coming from an infected area.

== Dependent, disputed or restricted territories ==
Visa requirements for nationals of Republic of China for visits to various territories, disputed areas, partially recognized countries, and restricted zones:

=== People's Republic of China ===
The People's Republic of China (PRC) does not recognize Taiwan, nor the government of the Republic of China (ROC), and uses its own law to treat different types of ROC nationals differently. Since the PRC nationality law does not recognize dual nationality, those who hold only the ROC nationality will be recognized as Chinese nationals; those who hold dual nationalities of ROC and another country will be recognized as foreign nationals. The Taiwanese passports are recognized in Hong Kong and Macao SARs on limited circumstances, but are totally invalid in all other mainland provinces, municipalities, and autonomous regions.

- A ROC national with household registration in Taiwan (NWHR) who does not hold any other nationality may obtain either a Mainland Travel Permit for Taiwan Resident or a Chinese Travel Document (if not holding a Travel Permit and intends to travel from a third country directly) for traveling to the PRC.
- A ROC national without household registration in Taiwan (NWOHR) who does not hold any other nationality is required to obtain a Chinese Travel Document for traveling to the PRC.
- A ROC national who is also a dual national of another country is required to obtain a Chinese visa or use the visa exemption schemes with the passport or travel document issued by another country for traveling to the PRC, in accordance with the visa policy of mainland China, visa policy of Hong Kong, and visa policy of Macau.

Visa requirements for traveling to the People's Republic of China (PRC)
Provincial-level divisions	Travel with Taiwanese passport	Travel with Mainland Travel Permit for Taiwan Resident	Travel with Chinese Travel Document
Hong Kong SAR	eVisa, 30 days free of charge. A printed authorization letter for Pre-arrival Registration for Taiwan Residents and a Taiwanese passport with a national ID number and a validity not less than 6 months are required upon arrival. Registration is not required for airside transit in Hong Kong International Airport.	30 days	Hong Kong SAR Entry Permit required except for airside transit in Hong Kong International Airport.
Macao SAR	30 days	30 days	7 days, transit only (the country or region traveled before and after Macao must be different).
Tibet AR	Admission refused. Airside transit refused.	Tibet Travel Permit required	Tibet Travel Permit required
All other provinces, municipalities, and ARs	Admission refused. Airside transit refused.	May stay through the duration of the Travel Permit (5 years for a regular permit issued before travel, 3 months for a single-entry permit issued upon arrival at port of entry)	May stay through the duration of the Travel Document (2 years)

To obtain the travel documents mentioned above:

- The Mainland Travel Permit for Taiwan Resident (台湾居民来往大陆通行证) is issued by the National Immigration Administration of China (NIA). An eligible person should has household registration in Taiwan (who are assigned a national ID number) and should not have any other nationality. A valid Taiwanese National ID card, a Taiwanese passport with a national ID number and a validity not less than 6 months are required to be submitted with the application. Since the PRC has no diplomatic mission in Taiwan, the application are usually accepted by authorized Taiwanese travel agencies who later forwards the materials to the Chinese NIA. A regular travel permit is multiple-entry and has a validity of 5 years. A single-entry Mainland Travel Permit valid for 3 months may also be issued upon arrival to specific ports of entry of China if the person does not hold a regular travel permit. A valid Taiwanese National ID card, a Taiwanese passport with a national ID number and a validity not less than 3 months, return ticket and 2 passport-sized photos, fee is CNY 150. Some airports may require additional documents, such as an invitation letter. Eligible airports are: Beijing, Changchun, Changsha, Chengdu, Chongqing, Dalian, Fuzhou, Guilin, Guiyang, Haikou, Hangzhou, Harbin, Hefei, Jinan, Kunming, Nanchang, Nanjing, Nanning, Ningbo, Qingdao, Quanzhou, Sanya, Shanghai, Shenyang, Shenzhen, Tianjin, Wenzhou, Wuhan, Wuxi, Xiamen, Xi'an, Xuzhou, Yancheng, Yantai and Zhengzhou.
- The Chinese Travel Document (中华人民共和国旅行证), Hong Kong SAR Entry Permit (香港特别行政区进入许可), and Chinese visa (中华人民共和国签证) are issued by a diplomatic missions of China. A valid Taiwanese passport or a passport or travel document issued by another country, as well as the document that proofs the legal presence in the applying country are required to be submitted with the application.
- The Pre-arrival Registration for Taiwan Residents (台灣居民預辦入境登記) is handled by the Immigration Department of the Hong Kong SAR. An eligible person should has household registration in Taiwan (who are assigned a national ID number) and should not have any other nationality. A Taiwanese passport with a national ID number and a validity not less than 6 months are required to be submitted with the application. Once the registration is granted, the person is authorized to visit Hong Kong twice, and may stay up to 30 days on each visit.
- The Tibet Travel Permit (台湾同胞进藏确认函) is issued by the Taiwan Affairs Office of the People's Government of the Tibet Autonomous Region. An eligible person should has a valid Mainland Travel Permit for Taiwan Resident or Chinese Travel Document, and a tour itinerary booked with an authorized Tibetan travel agency. The application is required to be submitted by the travel agency and the validity of the travel permit is identical to the itinerary booked.

=== Other ===
Visitor to	Visa requirement	Notes (excluding departure fees)
Europe
Abkhazia	Visa required	
Turkish Republic of Northern Cyprus	Visa not required	3 months. Passport required.
Gibraltar	Visa not required	Visa not required for holders of passports with National ID number only.
Kosovo	Visa not required	90 days, pre-arrival notifications must be made at least two weeks in advance.
South Ossetia	Visa required	Multiple entry visa to Russia and three-day prior notification are required to enter South Ossetia.
Transnistria	Visa required	Moldovan visa required. Registration required after 24h.
Africa
British Indian Ocean Territory	Special permit required	Special permit required.
Mayotte	Visa not required	90 days. Passport with National ID number required.
Réunion	Visa not required	90 days. Passport with National ID number required.
Ascension Island	Admission refused	From May 2015, the Ascension Island Government does not issue entry visas (including eVisas) to citizens of Taiwan.
Saint Helena	eVisa	
Tristan da Cunha	Permission required	Permission to land required for 15/30 pounds sterling (yacht/ship passenger) for Tristan da Cunha Island or 20 pounds sterling for Gough Island, Inaccessible Island or Nightingale Islands.
Sahrawi Arab Democratic Republic	Visa regime undefined	Undefined visa regime in the Western Sahara controlled territory.
Somaliland	Visa on arrival	30 days for 40 US dollars. Due to safety concerns, the Taiwanese government advises its citizens not to travel to Somaliland.
Asia
Iraqi Kurdistan	Visa required	
Palestine	Visa not required	Arrival by sea to Gaza Strip not allowed.
Caribbean and North Atlantic
Anguilla	Visa not required	3 months. Passport with National ID number required.
Aruba	Visa not required	90 days. Passport with National ID number required.
Bermuda	Visa not required	6 months
(Netherlands) Bonaire, St. Eustatius and Saba	Visa not required	90 days. Passport with National ID number required.
British Virgin Islands	Visa not required	6 months
Cayman Islands	Visa not required	60 days. Passport with National ID number required.
Curacao	Visa not required	90 days. Passport with National ID number required.
(France) French Guiana	Visa not required	90 days. Passport with National ID number required.
(France) French West Indies	Visa not required	90 days. Passport with National ID number required.
Greenland	Visa not required	90 days in 180 days. Passport with National ID number required.
Montserrat	Visa not required	6 months
Puerto Rico	Visa not required	90 days. ESTA and passport with National ID number required.
Saint Pierre and Miquelon	Visa not required	90 days. Passport with National ID number required.
Sint Maarten	Visa not required	90 days. Passport with National ID number required.
Turks and Caicos Islands	Visa not required	90 days
U.S. Virgin Islands	Visa not required	90 days. ESTA and passport with National ID number required.
Oceania
American Samoa	Electronic Travel Authorization	30 days.
Cook Islands	Visa not required	31 days
French Polynesia	Visa not required	90 days within 180 days. Passport with National ID number required.
Guam	Visa not required	45 days. Must hold a National ID card and disembark on a nonstop flight from Taiwan. Otherwise under the Visa Waiver Program, for 90 days on arrival from overseas for 2 years. ESTA and passport with National ID number required.
New Caledonia	Visa not required	90 days within 180 days. Passport with National ID number required.
Niue	Visa not required	30 days
Northern Mariana Islands	Visa not required	45 days. Must hold a National ID card and disembark on a nonstop flight from Taiwan. Otherwise under the Visa Waiver Program, for 90 days on arrival from overseas for 2 years. ESTA and passport with National ID number required.
Pitcairn Islands	Visa not required	14 days visa free and landing fee US$35 or tax of US$5 if not going ashore.
United States Minor Outlying Islands	Special permits required	Special permits required for Baker Island, Howland Island, Jarvis Island, Johnston Atoll, Kingman Reef, Midway Atoll, Palmyra Atoll and Wake Island.
Wallis and Futuna	Visa not required	90 days within 180 days. Passport with National ID number required.
South America
Galápagos	Pre-registration required	Online pre-registration is required. Transit Control Card must also be obtained at the airport prior to departure.
South Atlantic and Antarctica
Falkland Islands	Visa not required	A visitor permit is normally issued as a stamp in the passport on arrival, The maximum validity period is 1 month.
South Georgia and the South Sandwich Islands	Permit required	Pre-arrival permit from the Commissioner required (72 hours/1 month for 110/160 pounds sterling).
Antarctica	Special permits required	Special permits required for British Antarctic Territory, French Southern and Antarctic Lands, Argentine Antarctica, (Australia) Australian Antarctic Territory, (Antártica Chilena Province) Chilean Antarctic Territory, (Australia) Heard Island and McDonald Islands, (Norway) Peter I Island, (Norway) Queen Maud Land, (New Zealand) Ross Dependency.

Arab League — Certain countries will deny access to holders of Israeli visas or passport stamps of Israel because of the Arab League boycott of Israel.

== See also ==
- Visa policy of Taiwan
- Taiwan passport
- List of nationalities forbidden at border
