= Bahraini passport =

Travel document

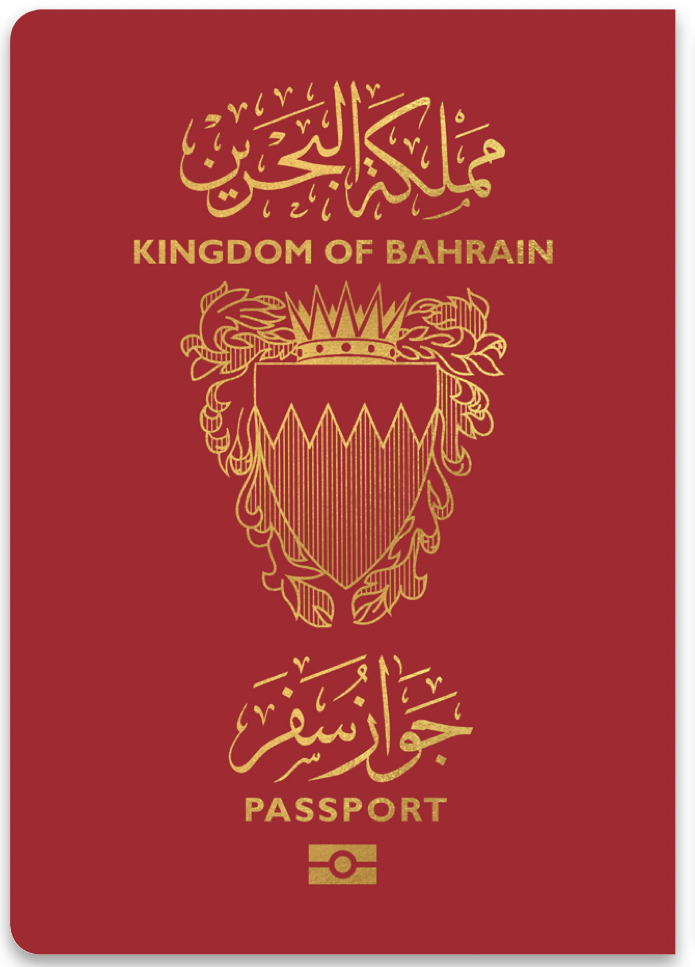
- The front cover of a Bahraini biometric passport

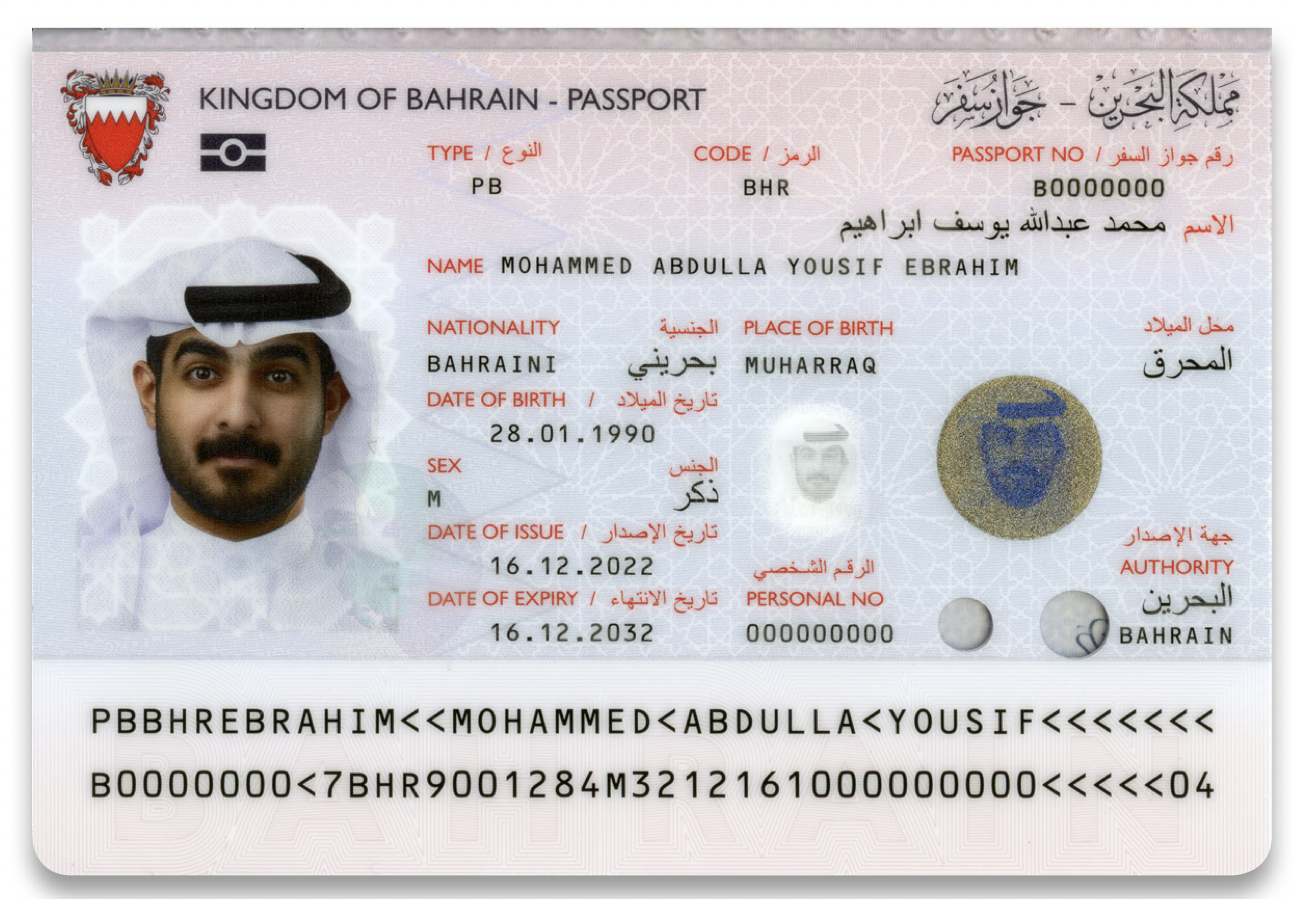
- Data page of Bahraini passport
- Type: Passport
- Issued by: Bahrain Ministry of Interior
- First issued: 20 March 2023 (biometric version)
- Purpose: Identification
- Eligibility: Bahraini citizenship
- Expiration: Adults 10 years, Children 5 years.

The Bahraini passport (Arabic: جواز سفر البحريني) are passports issued to Bahraini citizens for the purpose of international travel. They are issued by the Ministry of Interior.

== History ==
Bahrain started to issue Biometric passports since 20 March 2023.

== Types of Bahraini passport ==
=== Ordinary passport ===
Granted to a Bahraini citizen.

=== Diplomatic passport ===
A diplomatic passport is granted to:

- The King and his Crown Prince.
- The Prime Minister.
- The Commander-in-Chief of the Bahrain Defense Force and Head of the National Guard.
- Ministers
- Deputy Commander-in-Chief and Chief of Staff of the Bahrain Defense Force, Head of Public Security and Director of Staff of the National Guard.
- Members of the Bahraini diplomatic and consular corps and members of the missions of the Kingdom of Bahrain to international organizations that are counterparts to members of the diplomatic corps.
- Judges, members of the Public Prosecution Office, members of the Legislation and Legal Opinion Commission, and members of the military judiciary in the Bahrain Defense Force.

With the approval of the King, a diplomatic passport may be granted to:

- State employees sent on an official mission abroad, upon a request from the Minister of Foreign Affairs.
- Delegates to represent the Kingdom of Bahrain is one of the specialized agencies of the United Nations while performing their duties.
- Whom the King considers granting him this passport, other than the previous categories.

=== Special Passport ===
A special passport is granted to:

- Working employees of the rank of Undersecretary of the Ministry or above, and the like.
- Judges, members of the Public Prosecution Office, members of the Legislation and Legal Opinion Commission, and members of the Department of Legal Affairs and Military Courts in the Ministry of Interior.
- The former president and members of the Shura Council and the House of Representatives.
- Former ministers, former undersecretaries of ministries, and the like, after the approval of the Prime Minister.
- Former ambassadors and ministers plenipotentiary, provided that they have not been dismissed by a disciplinary decision.
- Administrative and clerical staff attached to diplomatic and consular missions and missions of the Kingdom of Bahrain to international organizations, after the approval of the Minister of Foreign Affairs.
- Heads of municipal councils and vice-presidents.
- Whosoever deems His Majesty the King to grant him a special passport other than the previous categories.
- Military personnel of the Bahrain Defense Force, the Public Security Forces, the National Guard and the National Security Apparatus of the rank of brigadier general and above are not eligible for diplomatic passports.
- Retired military personnel from the Bahrain Defense Force, the Public Security Forces, the National Guard and the former National Security Apparatus obtained a special passport of the rank of brigadier general or above, provided that the termination of service was not due to a disciplinary reason or a final judicial ruling, and after obtaining the approval of the higher command of the military authority to which he was affiliated.

=== Travel Document ===
Issued to Bahraini citizens under emergency circumstances.

== Appearance ==
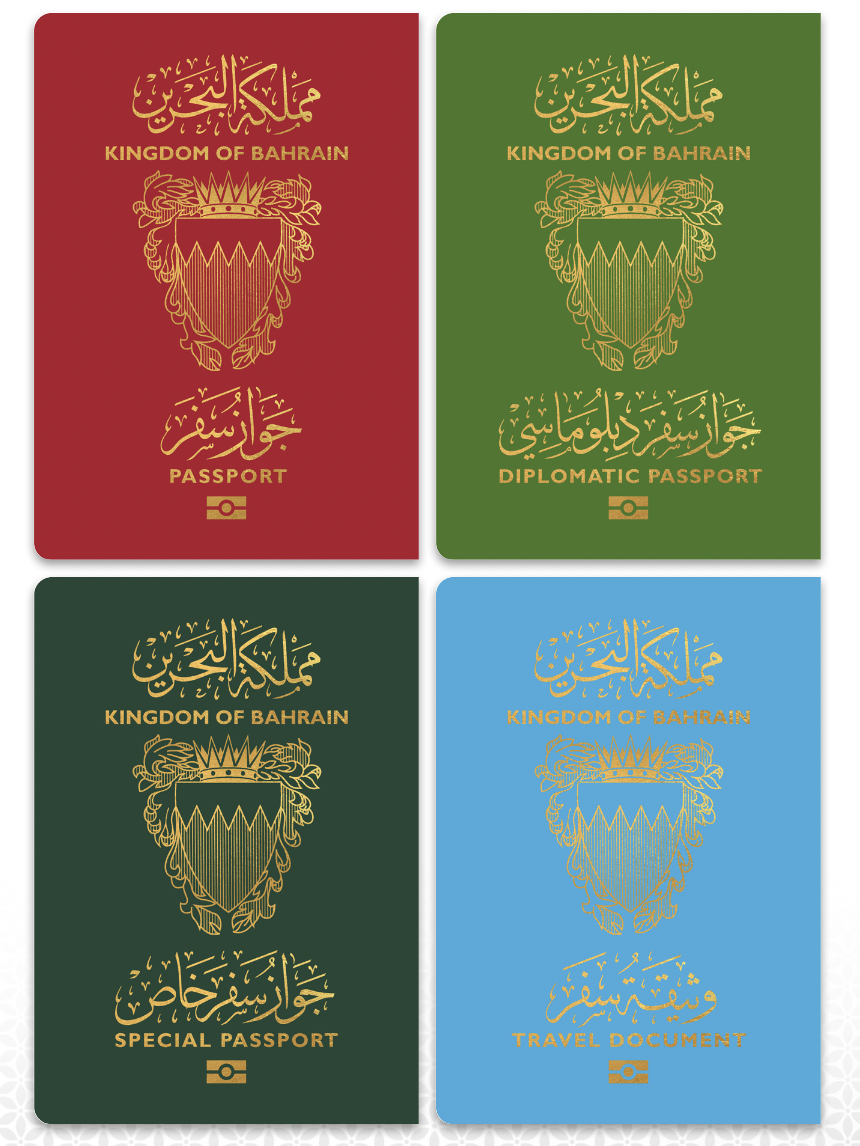
Covers of Ordinary, Diplomatic, Special, and Travel Document (2023)

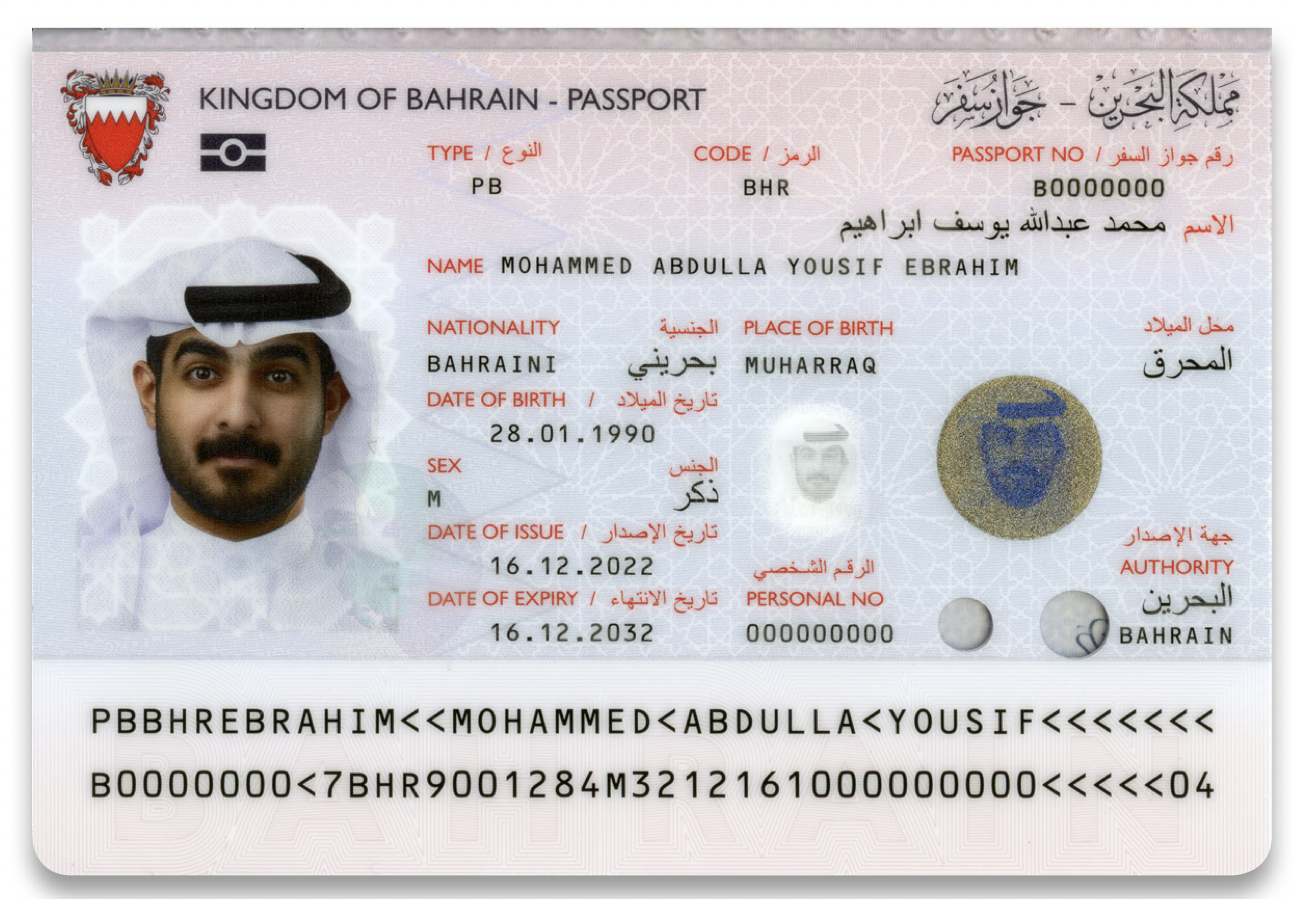
Data page of Biometric passport (2023)

=== Cover ===
The cover of the passport is embossed with a gold block design of the Kingdom of Bahrain emblem centered on the front. The text ‘KINGDOM OF BAHRAIN’ and the type of passport, ordinary book reads ‘PASSPORT’ in both Arabic and English.

There are four types of documents: the ordinary passport (B), the diplomatic passport (D), the special passport (S) and the travel document (T). Ordinary, diplomatic and special passports have 66 pages, while the travel document has 34 pages.

=== Bio-data page ===
The data page displays the holder’s image in three positions using three different technologies. Embedded within the poly-carbonate page is the chip and the antenna holding the biometric data. Information printed on the page in both Arabic and English includes:

- Type ("PB" for ordinary, "PS" for special, and "PD" for diplomatic)
- Country code (BHR)
- Passport serial number
- Passport holder's first, middle, and last name
- Nationality
- Date of birth (DD.MM.YYYY)
- Gender (M for male or F for female)
- Place of birth
- Personal Number
- Date of Issue (DD MM YYYY)
- Validity date (DD.MM.YYYY)
- Issuing Authority

== Visa requirements ==
As of 2024, Bahraini citizens had visa-free or visa on arrival access to 91 countries and territories, ranking the Bahraini passport 59th in the world according to the Visa Restrictions Index.

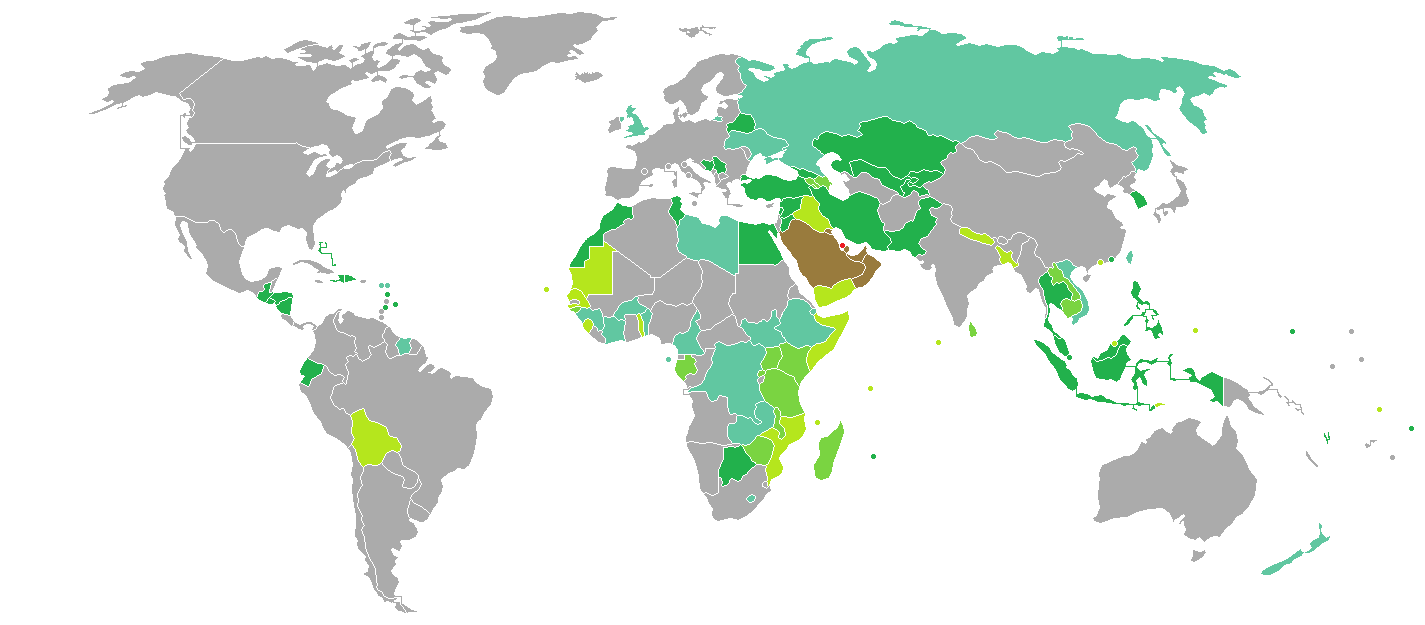
Visa requirements for Bahraini citizens Bahrain Freedom of movement Visa free access Visa on arrival eVisa Visa available both on arrival or online Visa required

== See also ==
- Visa policy of Bahrain
- Visa requirements for Bahraini citizens
