= Sanaag University of Science and Technology =

Public university in Somaliland

Sanaag University
- Former names: Sanaag University of Science and Technology
- Type: Public
- Established: 2009
- President: Ali Abdi Hurre
- Vice-president: Ahmed Warsame idle
- Location: Erigavo, Sanaag, Somaliland; 10°37′27″N 47°21′5″E
- Campus: Urban
- Colors: Green

Sanaag University (Somali: Jaamacadda Sanaag, sometimes Somali: jaamacadda gobolka sanaag) is a public university in Erigavo the capital City of Sanaag region the eastern edge of Somaliland.

== History ==
Its establishment was conceived in 2005.

Established on February 23, 2009.

In 2012, it was announced by the Somaliland Ministry of Education as one of 17 officially accredited universities.

In April 2013, the new school building was built with the donation of the Dahabshiil Group.

In September 2013, The first female student enrolled in the journalism course.

In November 2013, this university was reported as one of six national universities.

In 2018, a fourth graduation ceremony was held.

In 2020, a new school building was built.

== Topic ==
In May 2014, an exam to recruit employees for the Sanag region was about to take place at this university, but was postponed due to riots.

In July 2014, the Sanaag University Board of Trustees accused the Sanaag Secretary of Education of privatizing the university's expenses, which the Sanaag Secretary of Education denied as completely unfounded.

In 2015, President Silanyo spoke at the graduation ceremony of this university.

In November 2018, President Muse Bihi speaks at this university's graduation ceremony.

In 2022, a 60-year-old man made headlines as a graduate.

== Staff ==
=== President ===
- Ali Abdi Hurre (Somali: Cali Cabdi Hurre) Sep. 2014-

=== Vice President ===
- Hasan Bulsho
- Ahmed warsame idle Mar. 2018-

== Undergraduate programs ==
Established in 2009, the college offers undergraduate courses in various fields. Among these disciplines are:

- Faculty of Agriculture and Animal science
- Faculty of Business Administration
  - Accounting and finance
  - Management
  - Human Resource Management
- Faculty of Law
- Faculty of ICT
- Faculty of Health Science
  - Nursing
  - Midwifery
  - Nutrition
  - Laboratory
- Dentistry
- Faculty of education
- Faculty of Engineering
  - Civil engineering

== Admission ==
- Original secondary school certificate
- Passing written and oral entrance exam

== Faculties ==
- Faculty of Agriculture and Environmental Science
- Faculty of Education
- Faculty of Language & Skills
- Faculty of Engineering
- Faculty of Business Administration
- Faculty of Law
- Faculty of Health Science

== Notable people ==
- Roda Kayf - Somali Singer
