= Mayor of Erigavo =

Head of the government of Erigavo

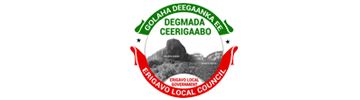

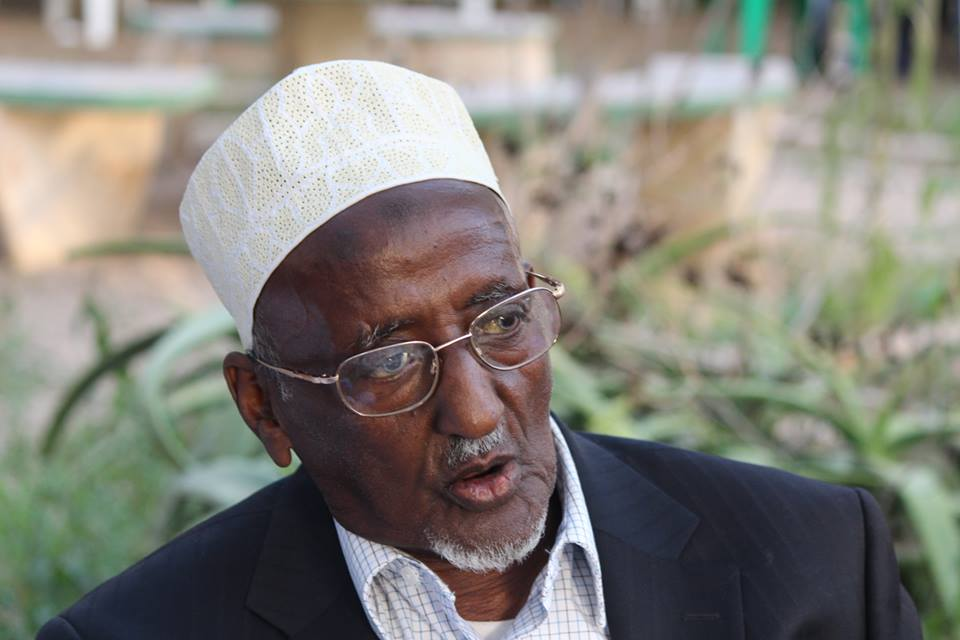
- Incumbent; Ismail Haji Nour since 23 December 2012
- Style: Mr Mayor (formally)
- Member of: Erigavo Municipal Council
- Seat: Erigavo City Hall
- Appointer: Erigavo Municipal Council
- Deputy: Abdirahman mohamud mohamed (Gaadhi-Jiid)

The Mayor of Erigavo is the chief executive of the city of Erigavo, the capital of Sanaag region in Somaliland. The current mayor is Ismail Haji Nour, who took office on 23 December 2012.

== List of mayors ==
Portrait	Name	Somali name	Term of office		
Portrait	Name	Somali name	Took office	Left office	Time in office
	Anthony Mariano ali		1920	1964	
	Hajji Hassan		1964	1972	
	Ali Yusuf aw Abdi		1972	1976	
	Abdullahi Dirie Osman		1976	1981	
	Salah Haji Hassan		1981	1988	
	Hassan Badhafe		1988	1990	
	Jama Ismail Hassan		1990	1994	
	Yassein Mire Ahmed		1994	1998	
	Hassan Hayir		1998	2002	
	Ismail Haji Nour	Ismaaciil Xaaji Nuur	2002	23 December 2012	
	Ismail Haji Nour	Ismaaciil Xaaji Nuur	23 December 2012	Incumbent (as of 2025)	13 years, 258 days

== See also ==
- Mayor of Berbera
- Mayor of Burao
- Mayor of Borama
- Mayor of Hargeisa
- Mayor of Las Anod
