= Shay Mire Dacar =

- Born: Abdillahi Mire Dacar; 1969; Erigavo, Somali Republic (now Somaliland)
- Died: 17 July 2016 (aged 46–47) Hargeisa, Somaliland
- Genres: Somali
- Occupations: Singer-songwriter, composer,
- Years active: 1980s-2016

Abdillahi Mire Dacar (Somali: Cabdillaahi Mire Dacar), more commonly known as Shay Mire Dacar was a Somali musician and artist.

== Biography ==
Shay Mire Dacar was born in the city of Erigavo, capital of the Sanaag region of Somaliland, in 1969. He began his musical career in the mid-1980s and became famous for his qaaci-style songs, performed with the accompaniment of the kaban (oud).

After the Somali civil war, Shay Mire moved to Bosaso, where he released several notable songs and in 1998, Shay Mire relocated to Hargeisa, where he continued his artistic endeavors until his passing.

Shay Mire Dacar held musical tours and performances in countries such as Djibouti, the United Arab Emirates, and the United Kingdom, where large numbers of his fans reside. He also participated in the Somali Week program in London in 2014, which is held annually and invites various poets and musicians.

== Discography ==
- Miyaan Seexdaa
- Bini Aadanbaa Tahay
- Malaha Waa Lagu Sitaa
- Bishaaradii Naftaydaay
- Aduunyadu Qaribanaa

== Death ==
Shay Mire died on July 17, 2016, in Hargeisa, and is survived by five children, three sons and two daughters.
