= Ismail Haji Nour =

Somaliland politician

Ismail Haji Nour Ismaaciil Xaaji Nuur
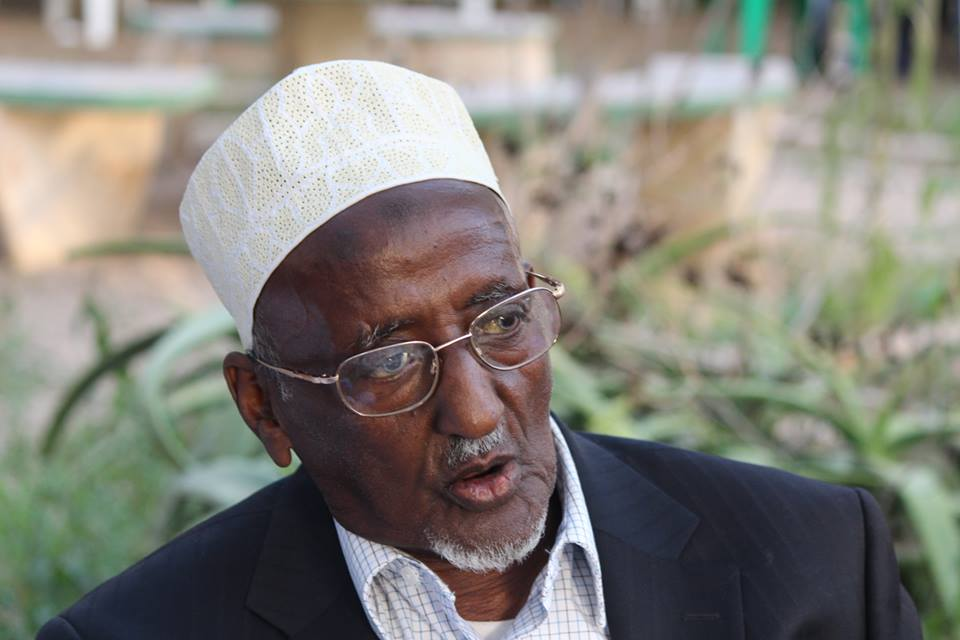

Mayor of Erigavo
- Incumbent
- Assumed office 2003 - 1800
- Preceded by: Yassin Mire Mahamad
- Incumbent
- Assumed office 2003 - 2012
- Incumbent
- Assumed office 23 December 2012

Personal details
- Party: Waddani

Ismail Haji Nour (Somali: Ismaaciil Xaaji Nuur) is a Somaliland politician and is the current mayor of Erigavo, the capital of Sanaag region of Somaliland, since October 2003. A well known businessman, he was imprisoned several times during the rule of Siad Barre for alleged dissidence. He is one of the longest serving mayors in Somaliland and the only mayor who has been re-elected.

== See also ==
- Mayor of Erigavo
- Erigavo

Political offices
Preceded by Mohamed Hassan Maidane	Mayor of Erigavo; 2012-present	Incumbent
