= Abdullahi Jama Mahamed =

Somali middle distance runner (born 2001)

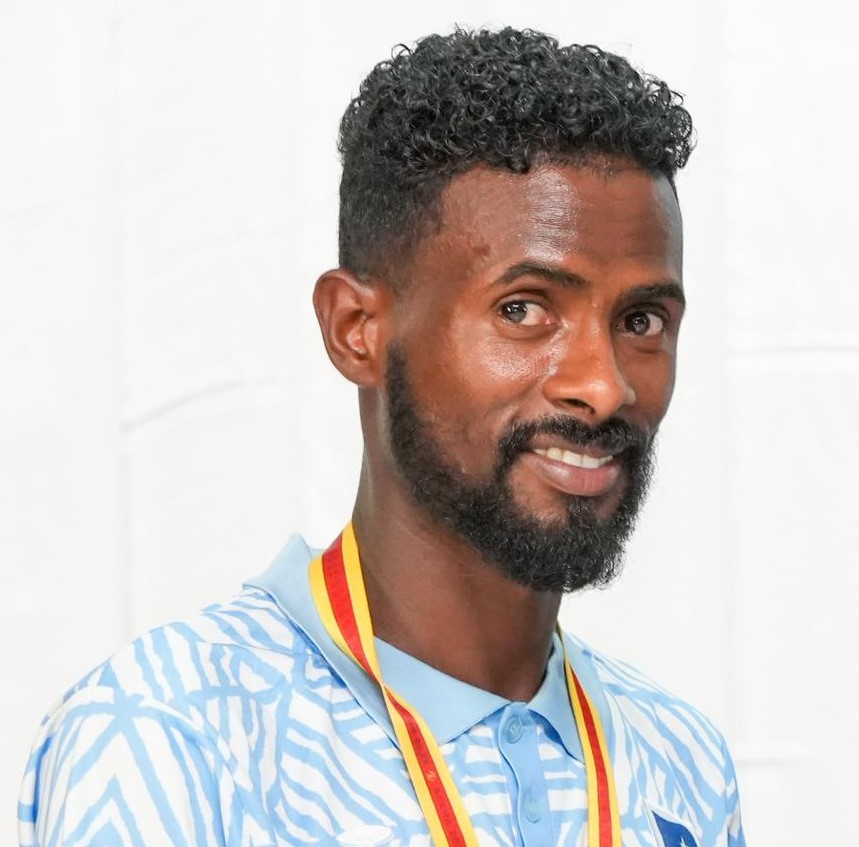
- Abdullahi Jama Mahamed

Personal information
- Nationality: Somali
- Born: 9 November 2001 (age 24) Erigavo, Sanaag

Sport
- Sport: Track
- Events: 1500m, 5000m

Achievements and titles
- Personal bests: 1500m: 3:39.97; 5000m: 13:38.64

Abdullahi Jama Mahamed (Somali: Cabdullaahi Jaamac Maxamed; born 9 November 2001) is a Somali middle distance runner.

== Biography ==
On 9 November 2001, he was born in a village along the Cal Madow mountain range, Erigavo District, Sanaag region. He spent his primary and secondary school years there. His grandfather was also fast on his feet.

Mahamed competed in a local 5k marathon in 2014 and won his first medal.

In 2016, he moved to Mogadishu for training.

In 2017, he participated in the Somali Athletics Meet and was later selected to represent Somalia at the Djibouti Athletics Meet.

In March 2019, he joined the national track and field team and won a gold medal in the youth 1500 metres with a time of 3:46.57 at an international competition in Djibouti.

In April 2019, he represented Somalia in Rwanda and won a bronze medal in the 1500m. In June 2019, he was honoured by the President of Somalia, along with two other athletes, for his work in Rwanda.

In March 2024, he represented Somalia in the 5000 meter run at the African Games in Accra, Ghana, where he won the silver medal with a time of 13:38.64. It was the first time in 35 years that Somalia had won a silver medal in this event. In April 2024, he was invited by the Somali Prime Minister to the Prime Minister's Office to receive an honorary medal.
