= Erigavo =

City in Sanaag, Somaliland

Ceerigaabo Ceerigaabo (Somali) عيرجابو (Arabic)
- City
- Erigavo
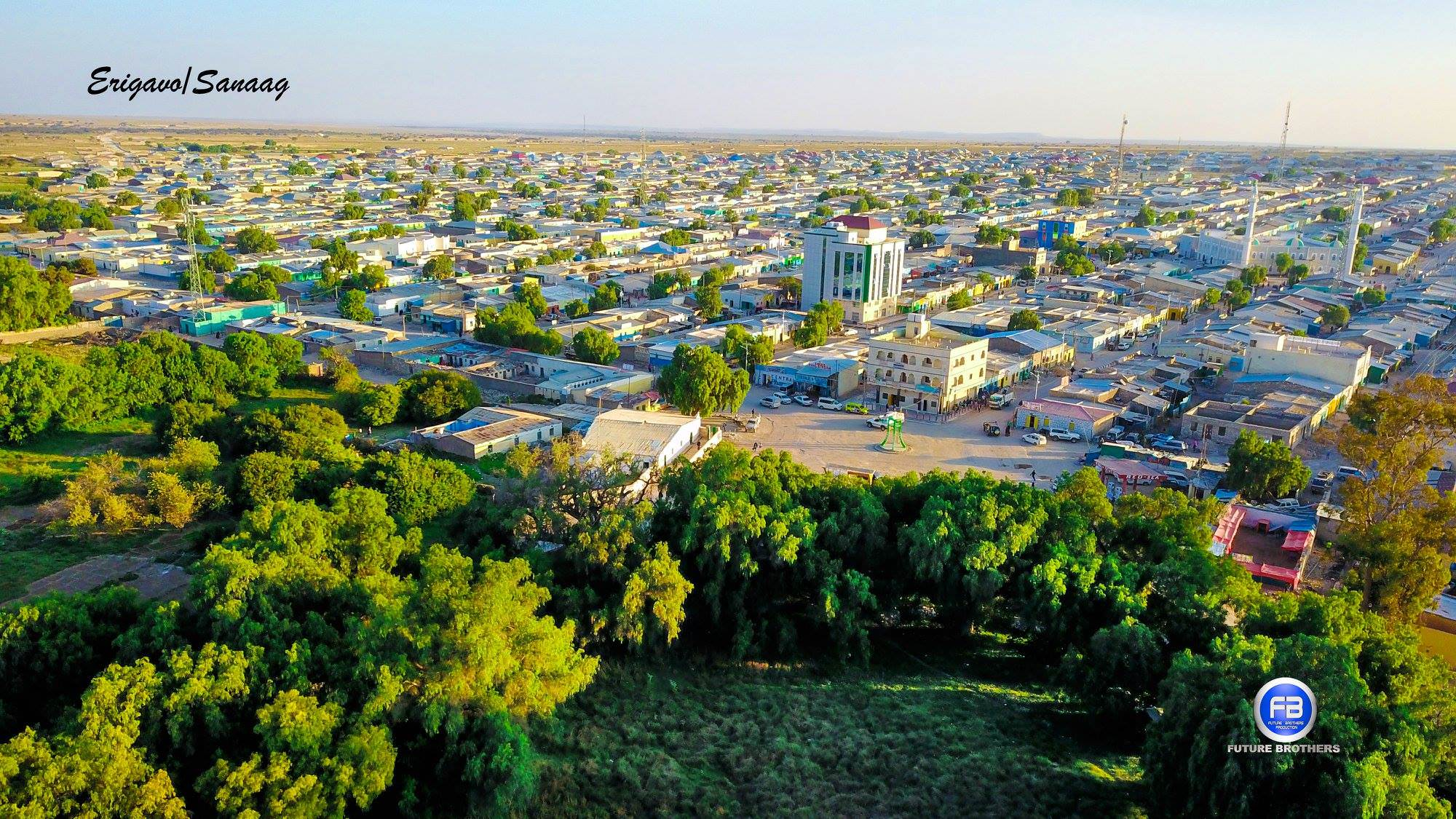
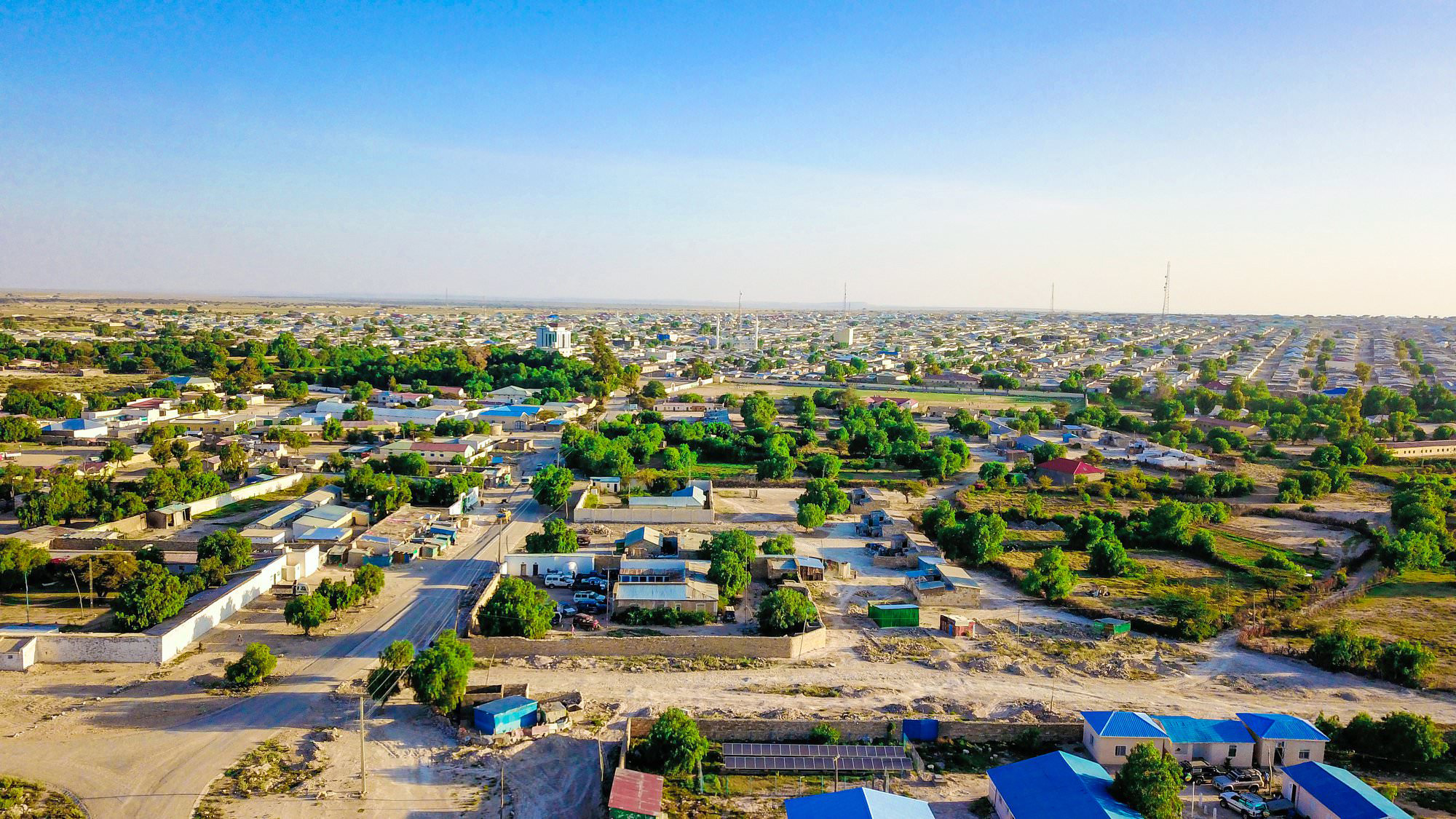

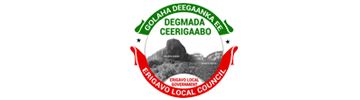
- Local council Seal of Erigavo

- Location in Somaliland Ceerigaabo (Somaliland)
- Coordinates: 10°37′05″N 047°22′12″E
- Country: Somaliland
- Region: Sanaag
- District: Erigavo District
- Established: 1924

Government
  - Mayor: Ismail Haji Nour

Area
  - Total: 26,000 km^{2} (10,000 sq mi)
- Elevation: 1,786 m (5,860 ft)

Population (2013)
  - Total: 30,000
  - Rank: 5th
  - Density: 180,000/km^{2} (470,000/sq mi)
- Time zone: UTC+3 (EAT)
- Area code: +252

Erigavo (Somali: Ceerigaabo, Arabic: عيرجابو), also spelled as Erigabo, is a city administered by Somaliland and the largest administrative center in the Sanaag region.

== Etymology ==
The name Ceerigaabo is described in Somali sources as composed of two elements: Ceeri, denoting a place where water collects, and gaabo (gaaban), meaning short or low; some writers also relate Ceeri to ceeriyaan, a Somali term for mist/fog, so that the toponym may allude to low-lying mist over the town. Variant English renderings of the town's Somali name (e.g. Ceerigaabo/Ceerigabo) reflect differences in romanization conventions for Somali long vowels and consonants noted in recent linguistic guidance.

== Geography ==
=== Environment ===
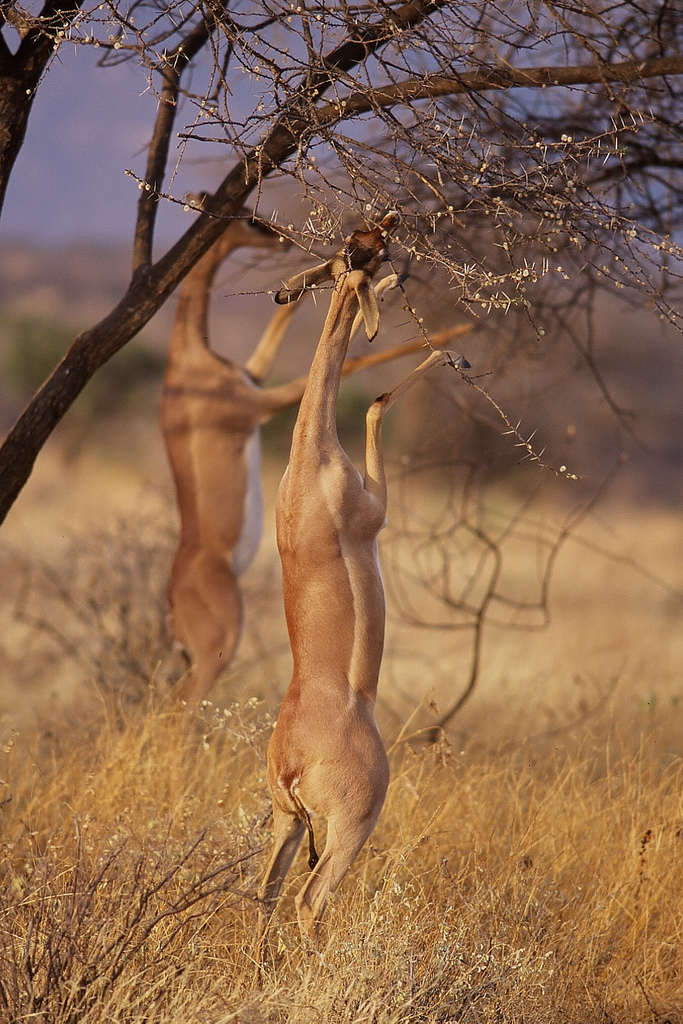
Gerenuks

10 kilometres or 6.2 miles to the north of the town are remnant juniper woodlands that form part of the northern escarpment forests fringing the Sanaag highlands, within the Somali montane xeric woodlands ecoregion. The escarpment forms a sharp drop to the Gulf of Aden coastal plain, reaching around 2,000 metres or 6,560 feet in elevation before descending toward the coast, a pattern typical of the northern ranges where upland catchments drain to the Gulf. 2 kilometres or 1.2 miles to the west, the massif rises to Shimbiris (Mount Shimbiris), the highest point in Somaliland at about 2,460 metres or 8,070 feet above sea level. A road from Erigavo also leads onto the Daallo plateau/Daallo escarpment, part of a long-recognized forest belt; the Daallo Important Bird Area supports evergreen forest dominated by Juniperus procera and Olea on the rocky scarp. The nearby ancient coastal settlement of Heis (Xiis) has been the subject of recent archaeological missions documenting its role in Red Sea trade networks.

Erigavo's uplands and the Daallo–Shimbiris escarpment host characteristic fauna of the North Somali mountains. Avifauna of conservation interest includes the endemic Warsangli linnet and other high-elevation species recorded in juniper woodland around Daallo. Wider ecoregional syntheses also note large mammals such as beira and dik-dik in these escarpment systems, with remnant high-altitude juniper stands forming key habitat patches. In the broader Horn range the Somali ostrich is native, and hamadryas baboon occurs in suitable escarpment and plateau habitats; both have been reported from the north Somali uplands and associated protected/IBA landscapes, including the Daallo area.

=== Climate ===
Under the Köppen climate classification, the Erigavo highlands have a mild semi-arid regime shaped by elevation, with warm days and cool to cold nights and without extreme heat typical of lowland arid zones; seasonal rainfall follows the Gu (April–June) and Deyr (October–November) peaks common to northern Somalia/Somaliland.

Station data compiled by the Deutscher Wetterdienst (DWD) indicate long-term average annual precipitation of about 435 millimetres or 17 inches at Erigavo, with the wettest months in the main rains and very dry conditions in boreal winter; temperatures are equable year-round and sub-zero minima have been observed in some months. The town's altitude on the Sanaag escarpment keeps mean monthly temperatures in the mid-teens to around 20 °C (68 °F) and sharply limits very hot days relative to coastal and inland lowlands.

Climate data for Erigavo, Somaliland
Month	Jan	Feb	Mar	Apr	May	Jun	Jul	Aug	Sep	Oct	Nov	Dec	Year
Record high °C (°F)	30.5 (86.9)	33.5 (92.3)	32.0 (89.6)	33.5 (92.3)	31.5 (88.7)	30.5 (86.9)	30.5 (86.9)	30.0 (86.0)	30.0 (86.0)	29.5 (85.1)	29.5 (85.1)	28.0 (82.4)	33.5 (92.3)
Mean daily maximum °C (°F)	24.5 (76.1)	25.5 (77.9)	25.5 (77.9)	26.5 (79.7)	26.5 (79.7)	26.0 (78.8)	26.0 (78.8)	26.0 (78.8)	25.5 (77.9)	25.0 (77.0)	24.0 (75.2)	23.5 (74.3)	25.5 (77.9)
Daily mean °C (°F)	15.0 (59.0)	16.0 (60.8)	17.0 (62.6)	18.0 (64.4)	19.0 (66.2)	19.5 (67.1)	19.5 (67.1)	19.5 (67.1)	18.5 (65.3)	16.5 (61.7)	15.5 (59.9)	14.5 (58.1)	17.5 (63.5)
Mean daily minimum °C (°F)	5.5 (41.9)	7.0 (44.6)	8.5 (47.3)	10.0 (50.0)	11.5 (52.7)	13.0 (55.4)	13.5 (56.3)	13.5 (56.3)	11.5 (52.7)	8.5 (47.3)	7.0 (44.6)	5.5 (41.9)	9.5 (49.1)
Record low °C (°F)	−3.5 (25.7)	0.5 (32.9)	0.5 (32.9)	2.0 (35.6)	1.5 (34.7)	4.0 (39.2)	5.0 (41.0)	4.5 (40.1)	3.0 (37.4)	0.0 (32.0)	−3.0 (26.6)	−3.5 (25.7)	−3.5 (25.7)
Average rainfall mm (inches)	18 (0.7)	13 (0.5)	33 (1.3)	38 (1.5)	81 (3.2)	64 (2.5)	10 (0.4)	41 (1.6)	114 (4.5)	8 (0.3)	13 (0.5)	2 (0.1)	435 (17.1)
Average rainy days (≥ 1.0 mm)	1	3	6	5	8	9	1	5	15	1	2	0	56
Average relative humidity (%) (at 14:00)	34	35	42	56	51	48	43	49	55	43	34	37	44
Source: Deutscher Wetterdienst (precipitation 1925–1950)

== Demographics ==
Erigavo and its district host a mix of clans; a late-1990s fact-finding account noted the town as “wholly dominated” by the Habr Yunis and Habr Je'lo branches of the Isaaq at that time. A 2013 district assessment by the Observatory of Conflict and Violence Prevention (OCVP) identified four main clans present in Erigavo—Habr Je’lo, Habr Yunis, Warsangali and Dhulbahante—with smaller numbers of other groups, indicating a heterogeneous urban composition.

Population figures in published sources vary by geographic scope and date. A 2011 photo-essay text estimated “180,000” for Erigavo, a figure consistent with district-level usage rather than the built-up town alone. By contrast, the 2013 OCVP assessment states the town's population was “about 30,000,” explicitly referring to Erigavo town. For contextual comparison, the 2014 Population Estimation Survey (PESS) placed the entire Sanaag region at roughly 540,000+, underscoring the large share of population outside the regional capital.

Sanaag has one of the highest proportions of nomadic households nationally, which shapes settlement patterns and seasonal movements in and out of the town; PESS-based tabulations report that a majority of the region's residents were nomadic as of 2014. Periodic shocks also affect short-term demographics; for example, clashes reported in December 2024 led to displacement in and around Ceerigaabo/Erigavo.

== Administration ==
Erigavo serves as the administrative seat of Sanaag region, and town affairs are managed by the mayor of Erigavo and an elected local council. As of the post-war municipal consolidation, taxes were levied and collected by the town council (recorded in 1999).

Under Somaliland's municipal system the mayor is chosen by the local council following municipal elections. In December 2012, the newly sworn council re-elected Ismail Haji Nour as mayor of Erigavo (a decision later confirmed in a court-ordered re-vote).

== Economy ==
Erigavo is the principal commercial hub of the Sanaag region, serving as the administrative and economic center of the highlands.

Markets in Erigavo function as regional trading points where livestock, imported goods, and agricultural produce are exchanged, linking coastal towns with inland communities; Food Security and Nutrition Analysis Unit (FSNAU) explicitly tracks Erigavo market prices and terms-of-trade as a key reference for the East Golis/Guban zone.

Livestock rearing and trade are central to livelihoods in Erigavo; FSNAU reports the town's cereal supply lines (including inflows from surrounding agro-pastoral areas and Bay) and notes that poor road infrastructure raises transport costs and market prices. Animal health and market participation have long been supported from Erigavo; following assessments in the early 1990s, ActionAid and VETAID opened an office in the regional capital Erigavo to run a paravet-based Animal Health Programme focused on water and animal health services for pastoralists across Sanaag.

The Sanaag highlands are also a center for the collection and trade of aromatic resins, particularly frankincense (Boswellia carteri and Boswellia frereana). Extensive harvesting and export have been documented in Erigavo and its surroundings. Erigavo is internationally known as a source of frankincense, and its woodlands are ecologically significant. Some foundations have invested in sustainable harvesting initiatives in cooperation with local resin-collecting communities.

Agriculture in and around Erigavo is practiced on a smaller scale due to altitude and climate, with irrigated plots in nearby valleys producing a variety of vegetables; reported vegetables include tomatoes, lettuce, onions, peppers, and cabbages. Fruits reported for the wider Sanaag highlands (with Erigavo as the regional capital) include apricots, pomegranates, figs, olives, apples, and grapes.

== Transport and logistics ==
Transport and logistics around Erigavo

The town is connected to Burao, capital of Togdheer region, as well as to the rest of the country via the Siilaanyo road, whose upgrades—including new culverts—have been reported in recent years.

The Burao-Erigavo road (also called the Siilaanyo Road) provides Erigavo's primary overland link to central Somaliland and onward to the Port of Berbera via Burao; the project spans about 284 km and was launched in 2014 to improve regional connectivity. In February 2020, the corridor received over 280 transverse drainage culverts on the Erigavo–Ina Afmadoobe section to address seasonal flows across the route. Food Security and Nutrition Analysis Unit (FSNAU) has noted that poor road infrastructure in the Erigavo catchment limits market access and raises transport costs, affecting staple cereal flows into the town's market. Eastward connections from Erigavo run via Badhan toward Bosaso; planning documents describe Badhan's approach roads as mostly minor routes, underscoring constraints on through-traffic to coastal markets. Air access is provided by Erigavo Airport (IATA: ERA; ICAO: HCMU), which has a compacted-gravel runway of approximately 2,000 m. In 2023, an automatic weather station was installed in Erigavo under the ICPAC Down2Earth project, enhancing local observation capacity for transport and market planning.

== Education ==
Gollis University also lists an Erigavo campus among its locations. Gollis University operates an Erigavo branch; on 24 September 2025 the Somaliland Minister of Education presided over the 10th cohort graduation at the Ceerigaabo branch.

Sanaag University is a public university based in Erigavo and offers undergraduate programs in the regional capital.

East Africa University (EAU) has one of its six branches in the city. East Africa University's Erigavo campus holds local graduation ceremonies (for example, the campus announced its graduation date of 12 October 2023).

Queen of Sheba University offers women in Sanaag free degree courses and a limited number of places worldwide in distance mode.

== Services ==
Urban services have expanded since the late 2010s through public–private and aid-supported programmes. In 2018–2019, the urban water system in Erigavo was rehabilitated under a PPP model financed by the EU with technical support from UNICEF and partners, alongside works in Borama, Burao and Tog Wajaale.

Health services in Erigavo include the government-run Erigavo General Hospital, which has received equipment and medical supplies delivered by the Ministry of Health Development in 2025 as part of service upgrades. In addition, the privately supported Sanaag Specialty Hospital in Erigavo was completed and opened in 2021, providing emergency, maternity, surgical and diagnostic services; planning documents and opening announcements describe it as a referral facility for eastern Somaliland.

Municipal safety and emergency services have been an explicit policy focus. In February 2020, the Somaliland Fire Brigade leadership met with Sanaag regional and Erigavo district authorities to coordinate the establishment and strengthening of a professional fire service in the town.

Electricity access has been partially improved through a hybrid generation project announced and launched in 2021, combining solar, battery storage and diesel capacity and reported to reduce retail power costs in Erigavo.

The city is home to a Boy Scouts organization. Formed in 2005 by the local Sanaag administration, the Scouts partake in various activities, including a 2006 training program on governance, peace and leadership.

== History ==
The Erigavo settlement is several centuries old. The surrounding area was supposedly built by the Madigan Dir. Modern Erigavo was founded by the Musa Ismail sub-clan of the Habr Yunis as a home well for passing nomads and caravans. The general area is noted for its numerous historical tombs, where various Somali clan patriarchs are buried.

=== 1945 Sheikh Bashir Rebellion ===
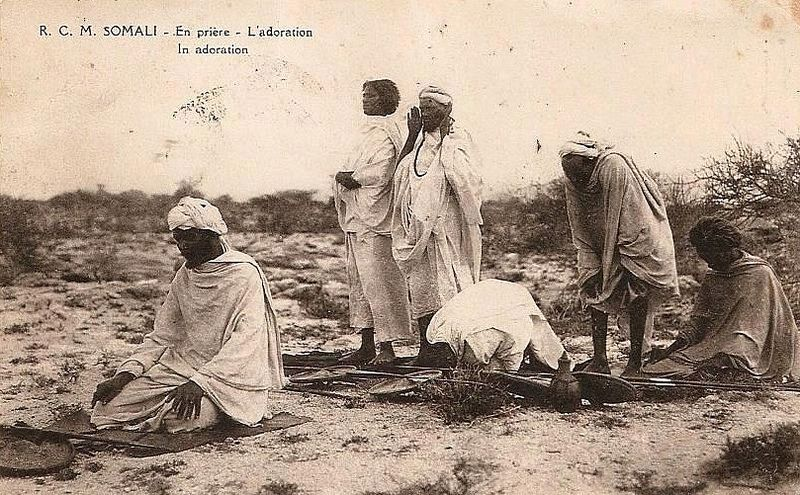
Sheikh Bashir praying Sunnah prayer, 1920

The 1945 Sheikh Bashir Rebellion was a rebellion waged by tribesmen of the Habr Je'lo clan in the cities of Burao and Erigavo in the former British Somaliland protectorate against British authorities in July 1945 led by Sheikh Bashir, a Somali religious leader.

On July the 2nd, Sheikh Bashir collected 25 of his followers in the town of Wadamago and transported them on a lorry to the vicinity of Burao, where he distributed arms to half of his followers. On the evening of July the 3rd the group entered Burao and opened fire on the police guard of the central prison in the city, which was filled with prisoners arrested for previous demonstrations. The group also attacked the house of the district commissioner of Burao District, Major Chambers, resulting in the death of Major Chamber's police guard before escaping to Bur Dhab, a strategic mountain south-east of Burao, where Sheikh Bashir's small unit occupied a fort and took up a defensive position in anticipation of a British counterattack.

The British campaign against Sheikh Bashir's troops proved abortive after several defeats as his forces kept moving from place to place and avoiding any permanent location. No sooner had the expedition left the area, than the news traveled fast among the Somali nomads across the plain. The war had exposed the British administration to humiliation. The government came to a conclusion that another expedition against him would be useless; that they must build a railway, make roads and effectively occupy the whole of the protectorate, or else abandon the interior completely. The latter course was decided upon, and during the first months of 1945, the advance posts were withdrawn and the British administration confined to the coast town of Berbera.

Sheikh Bashir solved many disputes among the tribes in the vicinity, which kept them from raiding each other. He was generally thought to settle disputes through the use of Islamic Sharia and gathered around him a strong following.

Sheikh Bashir sent a message to religious figures in the town of Erigavo and called on them to revolt and join the rebellion he led. The religious leaders as well as the people of Erigavo heeded his call, and mobilized a substantial number of people in Erigavo armed with rifles and spears and staged a revolt. The British authorities responded rapidly and severely, sending reinforcements to the town and opening fire on the armed mobs in two "local actions" as well as arresting minor religious leaders in the town.

The British administration recruited Indian and South African troops, led by police general James David, to fight against Sheikh Bashir and had intelligence plans to capture him alive. The British authorities mobilized a police force, and eventually on 7 July found Sheikh Bashir and his unit in defensive positions behind their fortifications in the mountains of Bur Dhab. After clashes Sheikh Bashir and his second-in-command, Alin Yusuf Ali, nicknamed Qaybdiid, were killed. A third rebel was wounded and was captured along with two other rebels. The rest fled the fortifications and dispersed. On the British side the police general leading the British troops as well as a number of Indian and South African troops perished in the clashes, and a policeman was injured.

Despite the death of Sheikh Bashir and his followers resistance against British authorities continued in Somaliland, especially in Erigavo where his death stirred further resistance in the town and the town of Badhan and lead to attacks on British colonial troops throughout the district and the seizing of arms from the rural constabulary.

=== Up to Somali independence (1960) ===
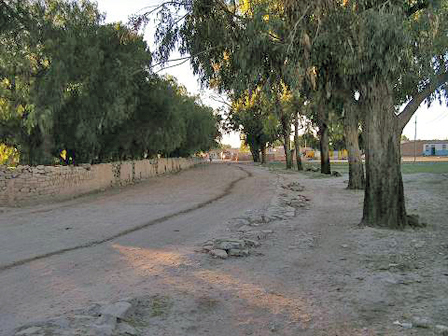
Pathway in old Erigavo.

Under the British Somaliland Protectorate, Erigavo served as the administrative seat for the Sanaag area on the high escarpment and appeared in colonial surveys as a regional centre for governance and pastoral economy.

=== 1960–1991 (to the Somaliland declaration) ===
During the final years of the Barre regime, Erigavo and wider Sanaag experienced conflict dynamics associated with the Somali National Movement (SNM) insurgency and government reprisals; human rights reporting from the period documents killings, arrests and short-lived insurgent incursions around Erigavo in 1989.

=== Since the Somaliland declaration (1991–) ===
Following Somaliland's 1991 declaration, Erigavo hosted a series of local reconciliations that culminated in the Sanaag Regional Peace Charter (“Erigavo Peace Charter”) on 31 August 1993, which codified inter-communal agreements reached across 1991–1993. Analytical accounts of Somaliland's bottom-up peacebuilding similarly identify the Erigavo conference as a key regional settlement that fed into state formation.

In the municipal sphere, Erigavo's post-war local government consolidated from the early 2000s: Ismail Haji Nour is recorded as serving as mayor from the 2002 local elections period, a tenure later discussed in election analyses of the time.

In mid-2015, local elders and officials in Erigavo publicly addressed disturbances in the town, coordinating with security authorities and urging calm and restraint to maintain public order.

In November 2018, Erigavo hosted a presidential visit, with large crowds welcoming the head of state and local authorities coordinating public-order arrangements.

In December 2020, local media reported that a large wildfire on the outskirts of Erigavo was brought under control by the town's fire brigade and authorities.

=== Recent history (2023–present) ===
In May 2024, unrest broke out in Erigavo after youths reportedly waved non-Somaliland flags; the Sanaag Regional Security Committee said more than 50 people were arrested in connection with rioting on 25 May. In August 2024, the president visited Erigavo and inaugurated local projects with regional officials.

In mid-December 2024, Somali-language outlets reported armed clashes inside Erigavo between Somaliland security forces and SSC-Khaatumo fighters, with fighting continuing into a second day in several neighbourhoods. Humanitarian agencies confirmed that the violence caused large-scale displacement from Erigavo and its environs.

In January 2025, Somaliland forces reported reasserting control over the nearby settlement of Jiidali following the December clashes. Later that month, Puntland's president publicly urged dialogue to ease tensions in Erigavo. Through 2025, officials and community leaders held reconciliation and peace-building meetings in Erigavo, with coverage including a large peace conference opened in September 2025 and follow-up government engagement in the city.

== Notable people ==
- Jama Ali Korshel — military and police leader; former First Vice President of Somalia.
- Abdullahi Ahmed Jama (born 1951) — born in Erigavo; military general and politician (Ilkajir).
- Asha Ahmed Abdalla — politician and former member of the Transitional Federal Parliament; publicly associated with representing the Sanaag region.
- Ismail Haji Nour — resident of Erigavo; long-serving mayor of the city.
- Shay Mire Dacar (1969–2016) — Somali singer and composer. He began his musical career in the 1980s in Ceerigaabo (Erigavo), Sanaag, and he died in Hargeisa in July 2016. He was born in 1969.
- Abdullahi Jama Mahamed (born 2001) — born in Erigavo District; middle-distance/long-distance runner, 2024 African Games 5000 m silver medallist for Somalia.
