= Visa policy of Bahrain =

Policy on permits required to enter Bahrain

Most visitors to Bahrain can apply for a visa on arrival or an e-Visa before traveling. Citizens of the Gulf Cooperation Council countries have freedom of movement in Bahrain and may enter with a national ID card. Passport must be valid for 6 months from arrival and visitors must hold return or onward ticket.

== Overview ==
In October 2014, Bahrain implemented a new visa policy that makes it easier for incoming travelers to get Bahraini visas. Travelers must have a passport that is valid for at least six months and a visa to enter Bahrain. However, travelers from approved countries can now get their visas online or when they arrive in the country. Bahrain has issued more visas since the policy was implemented than it did before. Starting in April 2015, Bahrain began sending applicants confirmations of their application status by text messaging.

In November 2016, Bahrain adopted new visa policy rules defining a two-week allowed stay on a single entry visa and a 90-day stay on a multiple entry visa valid for one year. In addition, a multiple entry visa valid for three months allows stay for one month. Citizens of Canada, Ireland, United Kingdom may obtain a five-year multiple entry visa allowing a 90-day stay on each visit.

In October 2020, the United States and Bahrain introduced a reciprocal agreement for a 10-year multi-entry visa scheme for citizens of both countries which also unifies the processing fees and validity of the visa at 90-days per visit for a cost of 160 USD (60 Bahraini Dinars).

== Visa policy map ==
Visa policy of Bahrain Bahrain Freedom of movement Visa on arrival / eVisa eVisa Visa required

== Visa exemption ==
Citizens of the Gulf Cooperation Council countries may enter Bahrain without a visa and may use a national ID card:

Freedom of movement

- Kuwait
- Oman
- Qatar
- Saudi Arabia
- United Arab Emirates

=== Non-ordinary passports ===
In addition to countries whose citizens are visa-exempt, holders of diplomatic or official/service passports may enter Bahrain without a visa for the following period:

90 days

- China
- France
- Greece
- Israel
- Japan
- Jordan

30 days

- Botswana
- Hungary
- India
- Indonesia
- Italy
- Kazakhstan
- Malaysia
- Singapore
- Sri Lanka
- Tajikistan

== Visa on arrival ==
According to Bahrain's e-Visa website citizens of all countries (except Belarus, Iran, Kosovo, and North Korea) may obtain a visa on arrival.

According to IATA Timatic, only citizens of the following countries may obtain a visa on arrival:

- All European Union member states
- Andorra
- Argentina
- Australia
- Bolivia
- Brazil
- Brunei
- Canada
- Chile
- China
- Colombia
- Ecuador
- Georgia
- Guyana
- Hong Kong
- Iceland
- Japan
- Kazakhstan
- Liechtenstein
- Macau
- Malaysia
- Mexico
- Monaco
- New Zealand
- Norway
- Paraguay
- Peru
- Russia
- San Marino
- Singapore
- South Korea
- Suriname
- Switzerland
- Thailand
- Ukraine
- United Kingdom
- United States
- Uruguay
- Vatican City
- Venezuela

== Electronic visa (e-Visa) ==
Citizens of all countries may obtain an e-Visa, except for the following countries whose citizens must have a guarantor (Bahraini commercial entity or a Bahraini individual) to obtain a visa:

- Iran
- Kosovo
- North Korea

Visas may be either single entry or multiple entry, and must be used within 3 months from the date of approval. In case of a visa rejection, processing fee is non-refundable whereas visa fee is refundable under certain circumstances. However, the refund request must be initiated by the applicant.

Visa policy	Validity	Number of entry	Duration of stay	Total price
eVisa	2 weeks	Single	2 weeks	9 BHD
eVisa	3 months	Multiple	1 month	16 BHD
eVisa	1 year	Multiple	90 days	44 BHD
eVisa	5 years^{*}	Multiple	90 days	64 BHD
Visa on arrival	2 weeks	Single	2 weeks	5 BHD
Visa on arrival	3 months	Multiple	1 month	12 BHD

_{* - Citizens of some countries cannot get 5-year e-Visa.}

=== E-Visa Application Requirements ===
E-Visa applicants must supply scanned copies of following documents along with their visa application:

- Applicant's passport
- Confirmed return air ticket
- Hotel booking in Bahrain or ID card of relative/friend (in case of staying with them)
- Bank statement under the visitor's name covering the last 3 months with an ending balance of at least the equivalent of 1000 USD

Applications are processed in approximately 3 to 5 working days.

== Residents of GCC Countries ==
Legal residents of Gulf Cooperation Council countries, irrespective of their nationality and except Iranian citizens, may obtain a visa online or on arrival at any port of entry, subject to the following conditions:

- Have held a residence permit issued by their country of residence for more than 3 months.
- Residence permit is valid for at least another 3 months at the time of the visa application.
- Occupation as per their resident permit must not be labourer.

== History ==
For a period of time, citizens of Qatar were banned from entering Saudi Arabia, UAE and Bahrain unless they were married to a local person.

== See also ==
- Visa requirements for Bahraini citizens
