= Visa requirements for Singapore citizens =

Administrative entry restrictions

A Singapore passport from 2018

Visa requirements for Singapore citizens are administrative entry restrictions by the authorities of other states which are imposed on citizens of the Republic of Singapore.

As of 2026, holders of Singapore passports have visa-free/visa-on-arrival/electronic-visa access to a total of 192 countries and territories, ranking the Singapore passport 1st in the world according to Henley Passport Index.

== Changes ==
Visa requirements for Singapore citizens were most recently lifted by Tajikistan (1 January 2022), Guyana (1 October 2023), Iran (4 February 2024), Timor-Leste (3 July 2024) and Azerbaijan (1 August 2026).

Timeline (expansion of visa privileges)
- No historical visa requirements: Brunei (visa-free); Indonesia (visa-free); Ireland (visa-free); Schengen Area (European Union + Iceland, Liechtenstein, Monaco, Norway, San Marino, Switzerland, and Vatican City; applies to Cyprus; excludes Ireland) (visa-free); United Kingdom (visa-free)
- 1972: Japan (visa-free; 1 January)
- 1982: South Korea (visa-free; 1 November)
- 1985: France (visa-free, 1 June)
- 1987: New Zealand (visa-free; 1 November)
- 1990: Mongolia (visa-free; 9 March)
- 1996: Australia (electronic authorisation; 11 September)
- 1999: Argentina (visa-free; 5 August); United States (electronic authorisation; 9 August)
- 2001: Taiwan (visa-free; 1 May)
- 2003: China (visa-free; 1 July); Slovakia (visa-free; 13 August); Vietnam (visa-free; 1 December)
- 2014: Brazil (visa-free; 9 January); India (e-Visa; November)
- 2015: Kazakhstan (visa-free; 15 July)
- 2016: Suriname (visa-free; January); Azerbaijan (visa on arrival; February); Cuba (visa-free; May); Myanmar (visa-free; 1 December)
- 2017: Belarus (visa-free; 12 February); Primorye, Khabarovsk, Sakhalin, Chukotka, and Kamchatka regions of the Russian Far East (visa on arrival; August); Qatar (visa-free, 9 August); Paraguay (visa-free; 5 October)
- 2018: Djibouti (visa-free; 21 January); Uzbekistan (visa-free; 10 February); Armenia (visa-free; 21 March); Angola (visa-free; 30 March); Guinea (visa-free; 20 November)
- 2019: Saudi Arabia (e-Visa/visa on arrival; September)
- 2022: Tajikistan (visa-free; 1 January)
- 2023: Guyana (visa-free; 1 October)
- 2024: Iran (visa-free; 4 February); Timor-Leste (visa-free; 3 July)
- 2026: Azerbaijan (visa-free);

== Visa requirements map ==
Visa requirements for Singapore citizens holding ordinary passports Singapore Visa not required / ETA (Note: ETA required for Australia, Canada if arriving by air, Israel, New Zealand, Saint Kitts and Nevis, Seychelles, United Kingdom and the United States) Visa on arrival eVisa Visa available both on arrival or online Visa required prior to arrival

== Visa requirements ==
Visa requirements for holders of normal passports travelling for tourist purposes:

Country / Region	Visa requirement	Allowed stay	Notes (excluding departure fees)	Reciprocity
Afghanistan	eVisa	30 days	e-Visa : Visitors must arrive at Kabul International (KBL).; The Government of Singapore advises its citizens not to travel to Afghanistan due to the ongoing situation in the country.	✓
Albania	Visa not required	90 days	May enter Albania using a national ID card in lieu of a passport.	✓
Algeria	Visa required		Persons may be denied entry if entering with a passport containing visas or stamps issued by Israel.; Visitors on tours organized to some southern regions by an approved travel agency may obtain a visa on arrival for up to 30 days.	✓
Andorra	Visa not required	90 days		✓
Angola	Visa not required	30 days	30 days per trip, but no more than 90 days within any 1 calendar year for tourism purposes only.; Visitors must have a return/onward ticket and a hotel reservation confirmation.; An International Certificate of Vaccination is required.	✓
Antigua and Barbuda	Visa not required	6 months		✓
Argentina	Visa not required	90 days		✓
Armenia	Visa not required	180 days		X
Australia	Electronic Travel Authority	90 days	90 days on each visit in a 12-month period if granted.; May enter using SmartGate on arrival in Australia.; Also eligible for a visitor visa (subclass 600) with a validity of six years, allowing a maximum stay of three months per entry during the visa's validity period.	X
Austria	Visa not required	90 days	90 days within any 180-day period in the Schengen Area.	✓
Azerbaijan	Visa not required	30 days	Singaporeans of Armenian origin are permanently banned from entering Azerbaijan and are included on the "list of persona non grata".	X
Bahamas	Visa not required	3 months		✓
Bahrain	eVisa / Visa on arrival	14 days		X
Bangladesh	Visa on arrival	30 days	Not available at all entry points.	X
Barbados	Visa not required	6 months		✓
Belarus	Visa not required / eVisa	30 days	Must arrive and depart via Minsk International Airport.	X
Belgium	Visa not required	90 days	90 days within any 180-day period in the Schengen Area.	✓
Belize	Visa not required	180 days		✓
Benin	Visa not required	14 days	Must have an international vaccination certificate.	✓
Bhutan	eVisa	90 days	The Sustainable Development Fee (SDF) of 200 USD per person, per night for almost all visitors to Bhutan. Additionally, if payment is made in US dollars from September 1, 2023 to August 31, 2027, the SDF is 100 USD.	X
Bolivia	Online Visa		Visitors must complete an online application, but still need to visit the embassy to receive the visa in their passport.	X
Bosnia and Herzegovina	Visa not required	90 days		✓
Botswana	Visa not required	90 days	90 days within any 1-year period.	✓
Brazil	Visa not required	30 days		✓
Brunei	Visa not required	30 days		✓
Bulgaria	Visa not required	90 days	90 days within any 180-day period in the Schengen Area.	✓
Burkina Faso	Visa not required	30 days		✓
Burundi	Online Visa / Visa on arrival	1 month	From December 2021, passengers of all countries that require a visa, can now obtain a visa on arrival at Bujumbura International Airport, and all land borders.	X
Cambodia	Visa not required	30 days		✓
Cameroon	eVisa		Holders of a pre-arranged approval issued by "Le Delegue General de la Surete" can obtain a visa on arrival.	X
Canada	Electronic Travel Authority	6 months	eTA required if arriving by air; not required if arriving by land or sea.	✓
Cape Verde	Visa not required (EASE)	90 days	Must register online at least five days prior to arrival.; Visitors must pay the Airport Security Fee (TSA) before visiting. The cost is 3,400 CVE (approx. 31 EUR) and can be paid via the online platform (EASE).	✓
Central African Republic	Visa required			X
Chad	eVisa	90 days	According to the e-Visa site, citizens of Singapore are exempt from visa requirements. The change is not reflected in IATA Timatic, so travelers may be denied boarding.	X
Chile	Visa not required	30 days		✓
China	Visa not required	30 days	A 30-day mutual visa waiver agreement was signed with China and was effective on 9 February 2024.	✓
Colombia	Visa not required	90 days	90 days - extendable up to 180-day stay within a 1-year period.	✓
Comoros	Visa on arrival	45 days		X
Republic of the Congo	Visa required		Except passengers with a VIP invitation.	X
Democratic Republic of the Congo	eVisa	7 days		X
Costa Rica	Visa not required	90 days		✓
Côte d'Ivoire	Visa not required	90 days		✓
Croatia	Visa not required	90 days	90 days within any 180 day period in the Schengen Area.	✓
Cuba	Visa not required	30 days		✓
Cyprus	Visa not required	90 days	90 days within any 180-day period.	✓
Czech Republic	Visa not required	3 months	3 months, regardless of previous time spent in other Schengen Area countries (pursuant to the Czech Republic-Singapore bilateral agreement that was concluded before the Czech Republic joined the European Union and the Schengen Area).	✓
Denmark	Visa not required	3 months	3 months within the past 6 months, regardless of previous time spent in other Schengen countries, but including time spent in other Nordic countries.	✓
Djibouti	Visa not required			✓
Dominica	Visa not required	6 months		✓
Dominican Republic	Visa not required	30 days		✓
Ecuador	Visa not required	90 days		✓
Egypt	eVisa / Visa on arrival	30 days	15 day free visa on arrival if arriving and departing from Sharm El-Sheikh, St Catherine and Taba Airports	X
El Salvador	Visa not required	3 months		✓
Equatorial Guinea	eVisa			X
Eritrea	Visa required			X
Estonia	Visa not required	90 days	90 days within any 180-day period in the Schengen Area.	✓
Eswatini	Visa not required	30 days		✓
Ethiopia	eVisa / Visa on arrival	90 days	Visa on arrival is obtainable only at Addis Ababa Bole International Airport.; e-Visa holders must arrive via Addis Ababa Bole International Airport.; e-Visa is available for 30 or 90 days.	X
Fiji	Visa not required	4 months		✓
Finland	Visa not required	90 days	90 days within any 180-day period in the Schengen Area.	✓
France	Visa not required	90 days	90 days within any 180-day period in the Schengen Area (in Regions of France).	✓
Gabon	eVisa	30 days	According to a document published by the Ministry of foreign affairs of Gabon, citizens of Singapore are exempt from visa requirements. The change is not reflected in IATA Timatic, so travelers may be denied boarding.	X
Gambia	Visa not required	90 days		✓
Georgia	Visa not required	1 year		X
Germany	Visa not required	90 days	90 days within any 180-day period in the Schengen Area.	✓
Ghana	Visa not required	60 days		✓
Greece	Visa not required	90 days	90 days within any 180-day period in the Schengen Area.	✓
Grenada	Visa not required	3 months		✓
Guatemala	Visa not required	90 days		✓
Guinea	Visa not required	30 days		✓
Guinea-Bissau	Visa on arrival	90 days		X
Guyana	Visa not required	30 days		✓
Haiti	Visa not required	3 months		✓
Honduras	Visa not required	3 months		✓
Hungary	Visa not required	90 days	90 days within any 180-day period in the Schengen Area.	✓
Iceland	Visa not required	90 days	90 days within any 180-day period in the Schengen Area.	✓
India	eVisa	30 days	e-Visa holders must arrive via 32 designated airports (Note: Ahmedabad; Amritsar; Bagdogra; Bengaluru; Bhubaneswar; Chandigarh; Chennai; Coimbatore; Delhi; Gaya; Goa-Dabolim; Goa-Manohar; Guwahati; Hyderabad; Indore; Jaipur; Kannur; Kochi; Kolkata; Kozhikode; Lucknow; Madurai; Mangaluru; Mumbai; Nagpur; Port Blair; Pune; Surat; Thiruvananthapuram; Tiruchirappalli; Varanasi; Visakhapatnam) or 5 designated seaports. (Note: Chennai; Cochin; Mormugao (Goa); Mumbai; Mangalore); An Indian e-Tourist Visa may only be obtained twice within 1 calendar year.; Foreigners of Pakistani origin or who hold a Pakistani Passport are not eligible for an e-Visa. Foreigners who are not Pakistani nationals, but whose parents or grandparents (either paternal or maternal) were born in, or were permanent residents in Pakistan, are also not eligible for an e-Visa.; Holders of a valid Person of Indian Origin or Overseas Citizen of India Card are exempt from visa requirements, and may travel to India unlimited times.	✓
Indonesia	Visa not required	30 days		✓
Iran	Visa not required	15 days	15 days within any 6-month period.; The Government of Singapore advises its citizens not to travel to Iran due to security issues in the country.	X
Iraq	eVisa	30 days	The Government of Singapore advises its citizens not to travel to Iraq due to the security situation in the country.	X
Ireland	Visa not required	3 months		✓
Israel	Electronic Travel Authorization	90 days		✓
Italy	Visa not required	90 days	90 days within any 180-day period in the Schengen Area.	✓
Jamaica	Visa not required	6 months		✓
Japan	Visa not required	90 days		✓
Jordan	eVisa / Visa on arrival		A 40 JOD Visa can be obtained upon arrival, but the fee can be waived for single entry evisa or visa on arrival if purchase Jordan Pass, obtainable at most international ports of entry and land border crossings (except King Hussein/Allenby Bridge).	X
Kazakhstan	Visa not required	30 days		X
Kenya	Visa not required	90 days		✓
Kiribati	Visa not required	90 days		✓
North Korea	Visa required			✓
South Korea	Visa not required	90 days	Singapore citizens can enter South Korea up to 90 days without a visa.; A K-ETA application can be completed up to 24 hours before boarding a flight. It will be valid for 3 years.; Singapore citizens are exempt from the K-ETA requirement from 1 April 2023 until 31 December 2026.	✓
Kuwait	eVisa / Visa on arrival	3 months	e-Visa is also available online.	X
Kyrgyzstan	Visa not required	30 days	30 days within any 60-day period.	X
Laos	Visa not required	30 days		✓
Latvia	Visa not required	90 days	90 days within any 180-day period in the Schengen Area.; From 1 September 2025, citizens of Singapore intending to enter Latvia without a visa or residence permit are required to submit an electronic declaration form at least 48 hours before seeking entry into Latvia.	✓
Lebanon	Free Visa on arrival	1 month	1 month extendable for 2 additional months.; Granted free of charge at Beirut International Airport or any other port of entry if there is no Israeli visa or stamp in the passport, and in possession of a phone number & address to be visited in Lebanon, and a non-refundable onward or round trip ticket.; The Government of Singapore advises its citizens not to travel to Lebanon due to the volatile situation in the country.	X
Lesotho	Visa not required	30 days		✓
Liberia	e-VOA	3 months		X
Libya	eVisa		The Government of Singapore advises its citizens not to travel to Libya due to civil unrest, and the political instability in the country.	X
Liechtenstein	Visa not required	90 days	90 days within any 180-day period in the Schengen Area.	✓
Lithuania	Visa not required	90 days	90 days within any 180-day period in the Schengen Area.	✓
Luxembourg	Visa not required	90 days	90 days within any 180-day period in the Schengen Area.	✓
Madagascar	eVisa / Visa on arrival	90 days	For stays of 61 to 90 days, the visa fee is 59 USD.	X
Malawi	Visa not required	30 days		X
Malaysia	Visa not required	1 month		✓
Maldives	Free visa on arrival	30 days		X
Mali	Visa required			✓
Malta	Visa not required	90 days	90 days within any 180-day period in the Schengen Area.	✓
Marshall Islands	Visa on arrival	90 days		X
Mauritania	eVisa	30 days		X
Mauritius	Visa not required	90 days		✓
Mexico	Visa not required	180 days		✓
Micronesia	Visa not required	30 days		✓
Moldova	Visa not required	90 days	90 days within any 180-day period.	X
Monaco	Visa not required	90 days		✓
Mongolia	Visa not required	30 days		✓
Montenegro	Visa not required	90 days		✓
Morocco	Visa not required	90 days		X
Mozambique	Electronic Travel Authorization	30 days	Visitors must register their ETA on the e-Visa platform at least 48 hours before travel and pay a processing fee of 48 USD, provided that they present normal passports valid for 6 months on arrival, as well as a return or onward ticket and a hotel reservation confirmation. In addition, an extension of 30 days is possible.	✓
Myanmar	Visa not required	30 days	The Government of Singapore advises its citizens not to travel to Myanmar due to the security situation in the country. Singaporeans are advised to leave as soon as possible.	✓
Namibia	Visa not required	90 days		✓
Nauru	Visa required			X
Nepal	Online Visa / Visa on arrival	90 days		X
Netherlands	Visa not required	90 days	90 days within any 180-day period in the Schengen Area (European Netherlands).	✓
New Zealand	Electronic Travel Authority	3 months	May enter using eGate.; International Visitor Conservation and Tourism Levy must be paid upon requesting an Electronic Travel Authority.; Holders of an Australian Permanent Resident Visa or Resident Return Visa may be granted a New Zealand Resident Visa on arrival permitting indefinite stay (pursuant to the Trans-Tasman Travel Arrangement), subject to meeting character requirements and obtaining an Electronic Travel Authority prior to departure. Such travellers are not required to pay the International Visitor Conservation and Tourism Levy.	X
Nicaragua	Visa not required	90 days		✓
Niger	Visa required			X
Nigeria	Free eVisa	30 days	Holders of written e-visa approval issued by Immigration Authority Headquarters in Abuja, can obtain a visa on arrival.	✓
North Macedonia	Visa not required	90 days		✓
Norway	Visa not required	3 months	3 months within the past 6 months, regardless of previous time spent in other Schengen countries, but including time spent in other Nordic countries	✓
Oman	Visa not required / eVisa	14 days / 30 days		✓
Pakistan	eVisa	3 months		X
Palau	Free visa on arrival	30 days	A visa is issued free of charge upon arrival at any port of entry.	X
Panama	Visa not required	90 days		✓
Papua New Guinea	eVisa / Visa on Arrival	60 days		X
Paraguay	Visa not required	30 days		✓
Peru	Visa not required	90 days		✓
Philippines	Visa not required	30 days	A single or multiple entry e-Visa for stays of up to 59 days is also available.	✓
Poland	Visa not required	90 days	90 days within a 180-day period, regardless of previous time spent in other Schengen countries (pursuant to the Poland-Singapore bilateral agreement regulating visa-free traffic that was concluded before Poland joined the European Union and the Schengen Area).	✓
Portugal	Visa not required	90 days	90 days within any 180-day period in the Schengen Area.	✓
Qatar	Visa not required	30 days		✓
Romania	Visa not required	90 days	90 days within any 180-day period in the Schengen Area.	✓
Russia	eVisa	30 days	Holders of an APEC Business Travel Card (ABTC) travelling on business do not require a visa.	✓
Rwanda	Visa not required	90 days		✓
Saint Kitts and Nevis	Electronic Travel Authorisation	3 months		✓
Saint Lucia	Visa not required	15 days		✓
Saint Vincent and the Grenadines	Visa not required	3 months		✓
Samoa	Entry permit on arrival	90 days		✓
San Marino	Visa not required	90 days		✓
São Tomé and Príncipe	eVisa		Visitors holding a visa issued by the United States or a Schengen Member State together with a passport valid for a minimum of 3 months from the arrival date may enter visa-free for a stay of up to 15 days	X
Saudi Arabia	eVisa / Visa on arrival	90 days		X
Senegal	Visa not required	90 days		✓
Serbia	Visa not required	90 days	90 days within 6-month period.	✓
Seychelles	Electronic Border System	3 months	Application can be submitted up to 30 days before travel.; Visitors must upload a reservation confirmation(s) for each visitor's location of stay in Seychelles.; Yellow fever vaccination certificate is required if coming from endemic countries.; Payment of the fee (EUR 10) by credit or debit card.; Valid for one journey only and it expires once exit the country.	X
Sierra Leone	Free visa on arrival	30 days		X
Slovakia	Visa not required	90 days	90 days within any 180-day period in the Schengen Area.	✓
Slovenia	Visa not required	90 days	90 days within any 180-day period in the Schengen Area.	✓
Solomon Islands	Free Visitor's permit on arrival	3 months	3 months within any 1-year period.	X
Somalia	eVisa	30 days		X
South Africa	Visa not required	90 days		✓
South Sudan	eVisa		Obtainable online 30 days single entry for 100 USD, 90 days multiple entry for 200 USD and 180 days multiple entry for 350 USD.; Printed visa authorization must be presented at the time of travel.	X
Spain	Visa not required	90 days	90 days within any 180-day period in the Schengen Area.	✓
Sri Lanka	Visa not required	30 days	Citizens of Singapore are exempt from the requirement of obtaining a tourist standard e-Visa.	✓
Sudan	Visa required		Pre-Approved Visa can be obtained on arrival.	✓
Suriname	Visa not required	90 days	An entrance fee of USD 50 or EUR 50 must be paid online prior to arrival.; Multiple entry e-Visa is also available.	✓
Sweden	Visa not required	90 days	90 days within any 180-day period in the Schengen Area.	✓
Switzerland	Visa not required	90 days	90 days within any 180-day period in the Schengen Area.	✓
Syria	eVisa		Singaporeans of Syrian origin, or Singaporeans whose passport states that they were born in Algeria, Bahrain, Jordan, Kuwait, Lebanon, Mauritania, Morocco, Oman, Qatar, Saudi Arabia, Somalia, Sudan, Syria, Tunisia, United Arab Emirates or Yemen are visa exempt.	X
Tajikistan	Visa not required / eVisa	30 days / 60 days		X
Tanzania	Visa not required	90 days		✓
Thailand	Visa not required	30 days		✓
Timor-Leste	Visa not required	30 days		✓
Togo	eVisa	15 days		X
Tonga	Free visa on arrival	31 days		X
Trinidad and Tobago	Visa not required			✓
Tunisia	Visa not required	3 months		X
Turkey	Visa not required	3 months		✓
Turkmenistan	Visa required		When transiting between two non-bordering countries, visitors can obtain a Turkmenistan transit visa for a five-day stay. This must be applied for in advance at the Turkmenistan Embassy. Visitors must also submit copies of the visas for the country of entry into Turkmenistan and the country of departure from Turkmenistan. Visa fee is 20 USD.	✓
Tuvalu	Visa on arrival	1 month		X
Uganda	Visa not required	3 months		✓
Ukraine	eVisa	30 days	The Government of Singapore has advised its citizens not to travel to Ukraine due to Russia's continued aggression towards Ukraine. Singaporeans in Ukraine are advised to leave as soon as possible.	✓
United Arab Emirates	Visa not required	90 days	Visa on Arrival is issued free of charge for stays not exceeding 90 Days.; Extension is possible for a fee.	✓
United Kingdom	Electronic Travel Authorisation	6 months	ETA UK (valid for 2 years when issued) required.; Adults can use ePassport gates.	✓
United States	Visa Waiver Program	90 days	ESTA is valid for 2 years from the date of issuance.; ESTA is also required when entering the country by cruise ship or land.; A Form I-94 is required for entry into the United States by land. It carries a $30 fee and can be obtained either online or upon arrival.; Visa required for nationals of VWP countries who have travelled or been present in Iran, Iraq, Libya, North Korea, Somalia, Sudan, Syria or Yemen at any time on or after 1 March 2011 or Cuba at any time on or after 12 January 2021, or nationals of VWP countries who are also nationals of Iran, Iraq, North Korea, Sudan or Syria. Exceptions apply if the travel was in military or diplomatic service of the VWP country.	✓
Uruguay	Visa not required	3 months		✓
Uzbekistan	Visa not required	30 days		X
Vanuatu	Visa not required	120 days		✓
Vatican City	Visa not required	90 days		✓
Venezuela	eVisa		Introduction of Electronic Visa System for Tourist and Business Travelers.	X
Vietnam	Visa not required	30 days		✓
Yemen	Visa required		The Government of Singapore has advised its citizens not to travel to Yemen due to the ongoing civil war in the country. Singaporeans currently in Yemen are advised to leave immediately.; Separately, Yemen introduced an e-Visa system for visitors who meet certain eligibility requirements (group travel of 10 or more people, business trips, and transit etc.).	✓
Zambia	Visa not required	90 days		✓
Zimbabwe	Visa not required	3 months		✓

=== Territories and disputed areas ===
Visa requirements for Singapore citizens for visits to various territories, disputed areas, partially recognised countries and restricted zones:

Visitor to	Visa requirement	Notes (excluding departure fees)
Europe
Abkhazia	Visa required	Tourists from all countries (except Georgia) can visit Abkhazia for a period not exceeding 24 hours as part of an organized tourist group.
Mount Athos	Special permit required	Special permit required (4 days: 25 EUR for Orthodox visitors, 35 EUR for non-Orthodox visitors, 18 EUR for students). There is a visitors' quota: maximum 100 Orthodox and 10 non-Orthodox per day and women are not allowed.
(Belarus) Brest and Grodno	Visa not required	Visa-free for 10 days.
Faroe Islands	Visa not required	
Gibraltar	Visa not required	
Guernsey	Visa not required	
Isle of Man	Visa not required	
(Norway) Jan Mayen	Permit required	Permit issued by the local police required for staying for less than 24 hours and permit issued by the Norwegian police for staying for more than 24 hours.
Jersey	Visa not required	
Kosovo	Visa not required	90 days
Northern Cyprus	Visa not required	3 months
Russia	Special authorization required	Several closed cities and regions in Russia require special authorization.
South Ossetia	Visa required	To enter South Ossetia, visitors must have a multiple-entry visa for Russia and register their stay with the Migration Service of the Ministry of Internal Affairs within 3 days.
Transnistria	Visa not required	Visitors must complete and obtain a temporary migration card at the border checkpoint. The maximum period of stay is 45 days, and it can be extended multiple times through this card.
Africa
Ascension Island	eVisa	3 months within any 1-year period.
British Indian Ocean Territory	Special permit required	Special permit required.
Eritrea outside Asmara	Travel permit required	To travel in the rest of the country, a Travel Permit for Foreigners is required (20 Eritrean nakfa).
Mayotte	Visa not required	
Réunion	Visa not required	
Saint Helena	Visa not required	
Tristan da Cunha	Permission required	Permission to land required for 15/30 pounds sterling (yacht/ship passenger) for Tristan da Cunha Island or 20 pounds sterling for Gough Island, Inaccessible Island or Nightingale Islands.
Sahrawi Arab Democratic Republic	Undefined visa regime	Undefined visa regime in the Western Sahara controlled territory.
Somaliland	Visa required	
Sudan	Travel permit required	All foreigners travelling more than 25 kilometres (16 mi) outside of Khartoum must obtain a travel permit.
(Sudan) Darfur	Travel permit required	Separate travel permit is required.
Asia
(Tajikistan) Gorno-Badakhshan Autonomous Province	OIVR permit required	OIVR permit required (15+5 Tajikistani Somoni) and another special permit (free of charge) is required for Lake Sarez.
Hong Kong	Visa not required	90 days
India PAP/RAP	PAP/RAP required	Protected Area Permit (PAP) required for whole states of Nagaland and Sikkim and parts of states Manipur, Arunachal Pradesh, Uttaranchal, Jammu and Kashmir, Rajasthan, Himachal Pradesh. Restricted Area Permit (RAP) is required for all of Andaman and Nicobar Islands and parts of Sikkim. Some of these requirements are occasionally lifted for a year.
Kazakhstan	Special permission required	Special permission required for the town of Baikonur and surrounding areas in Kyzylorda Oblast, and the town of Gvardeyskiy near Almaty.
(Iran) Kish Island	Visa not required	14 days; Visitors to Kish Island do not require a visa.
Macao	Visa not required	30 days
Maldives	Permission required	With the exception of the capital Malé, tourists are generally prohibited from visiting non-resort islands without the express permission of the Government of Maldives.
North Korea outside Pyongyang	Special permit required	People are not allowed to leave the capital city, tourists can only leave the capital with a governmental tourist guide (no independent moving)
Palestine	Visa not required	Arrival by sea to Gaza Strip not allowed.
(Malaysia) Sabah and Sarawak	Visa not required	These states have their own immigration authorities and a passport is required to travel to them, however, the same visa applies.
Taiwan	Visa not required	30 days
(China) Tibet Autonomous Region	TTP required	Tibet Travel Permit required (10 US Dollars).
Turkmenistan	Special permit required	A special permit, issued prior to arrival by the Ministry of Foreign Affairs, is required if visiting the following places: Atamurat, Cheleken, Dashoguz, Serakhs and Serhetabat.
(United Nations) Korean Demilitarized Zone	Restricted zone	An official company is able to provide access to the Buffer Zone.
(United Nations) UNDOF Zone and Ghajar	Restricted zone	
Yemen	Special permission required	Special permission needed for travel outside Sanaa or Aden.
Caribbean and North Atlantic
Anguilla	Visa not required	3 months
Aruba	Visa not required	30 days, extendible to 180 days
Bermuda	Visa not required	Up to 6 months, decided on arrival
(Netherlands) Bonaire, St. Eustatius and Saba	Visa not required	3 months
British Virgin Islands	Visa not required	30 days, extensions possible
Cayman Islands	Visa not required	6 months
Curacao	Visa not required	3 months
(France) French Guiana	Visa not required	
(France) French West Indies	Visa not required	French West Indies refers to Martinique, Guadeloupe, Saint Martin and Saint Barthélemy.
Greenland	Visa not required	
(Venezuela) Margarita Island	Visa required	All visitors are fingerprinted.
Montserrat	Visa not required	6 months
Puerto Rico	Electronic System for Travel Authorization	Visa not required under the Visa Waiver Program, for 90 days on arrival from overseas for 2 years. ESTA required.
Saint Pierre and Miquelon	Visa not required	
(Colombia) San Andrés and Leticia	Tourist Card on arrival	Visitors arriving at Gustavo Rojas Pinilla International Airport and Alfredo Vásquez Cobo International Airport must buy tourist cards on arrival.
Sint Maarten	Visa not required	3 months
Turks and Caicos Islands	Visa not required	90 days
U.S. Virgin Islands	Electronic System for Travel Authorization	Visa not required under the Visa Waiver Program, for 90 days on arrival from overseas for 2 years. ESTA required.
Oceania
American Samoa	Electronic authorization	30 days
(Australia) Ashmore and Cartier Islands	Special authorisation required	Special authorisation required.
(France) Clipperton Island	Special permit required	Special permit required.
Cook Islands	Visa not required	31 days
French Polynesia	Visa not required	
Guam	Visa not required	45 days
(Fiji) Lau Province	Special permission required	Special permission required.
New Caledonia	Visa not required	
Niue	Visa not required	30 days
Northern Mariana Islands	Visa not required	45 days
Pitcairn Islands	Visa not required	14 days visa-free and landing fee 35 USD or tax of 5 USD if not going ashore.
United States Minor Outlying Islands	Special permits required	Special permits required for Baker Island, Howland Island, Jarvis Island, Johnston Atoll, Kingman Reef, Midway Atoll, Palmyra Atoll and Wake Island.
Wallis and Futuna	Visa not required	
South America
Galápagos	Pre-registration required	60 days; Visitors must pre-register to receive a 20 USD Transit Control Card (TCT).
South Atlantic and Antarctica
Falkland Islands	Visa not required	A visitor permit is normally issued as a stamp in the passport on arrival, The maximum validity period is 1 month.
South Georgia and the South Sandwich Islands	Permit required	Pre-arrival permit from the Commissioner required (72 hours/1 month for 110/160 pounds sterling).
Antarctica	Special permits required	Special permits required for British Antarctic Territory, French Southern and Antarctic Lands, Argentine Antarctica, (Australia) Australian Antarctic Territory, (Antártica Chilena Province) Chilean Antarctic Territory, (Australia) Heard Island and McDonald Islands, (Norway) Peter I Island, (Norway) Queen Maud Land, (New Zealand) Ross Dependency.

- Visas for Cambodia, Myanmar, Rwanda, São Tomé and Príncipe, Senegal, Sri Lanka and Turkey are obtainable online.

== Pre-approved visa pick-up ==
Pre-approved visas can be picked up on arrival in the following countries instead of an embassy or consulate.

Pre-approved visas pick-up on arrival	Conditions
Bhutan	For a maximum stay of 15 days if the application was submitted at least 2 1/2 months before arrival and if the clearance was obtained.
Cameroon	Must hold approval from the General Delegate of Security.
Eritrea	Must have a sponsor who must submit an application at least 48 hours before arrival.
Liberia	Available only if arriving from a country without a diplomatic mission of Liberia and if a sponsor obtained an approval.
Nigeria	Holders of a visa application who have a Nigerian company taking responsibility for them.
Sudan	Holders of an entry permit issued by the Ministry of Interior.
Turkmenistan	Holders of an invitation letter of the local company that was approved by the Ministry of Foreign Affairs.

== APEC Business Travel Card ==
Full members of the scheme Transitional members (United States, Canada)

Holders of an APEC Business Travel Card (ABTC) travelling on business do not require a visa to the following countries:

- Australia^{2}
- Brunei^{2}
- Chile^{2}
- China^{4}
- Hong Kong^{4}
- Indonesia^{4}
- Japan^{2}
- Malaysia^{2}
- Mexico^{1}
- New Zealand^{2}
- Papua New Guinea^{4}
- Peru^{2}
- Philippines^{4}
- Russia^{3}
- South Korea^{2}
- Taiwan^{2}
- Thailand^{2}
- Vietnam^{4}

_{1 - Up to 180 days}
_{2 - Up to 90 days}
_{3 - Up to 90 days in a period of 180 days}
_{4 - Up to 60 days}

The card must be used in conjunction with a passport and has the following advantages:

- No need to apply for a visa or entry permit to APEC countries, as the card is treated as such (except by Canada and United States)
- Undertake legitimate business in participating economies
- Expedited border crossing in all member economies, including transitional members

== Automated border control systems ==
Singapore citizens aged 6 and older are eligible to use the automated clearance lanes at the ICA Checkpoints run by the Immigration and Checkpoints Authority, provided that their biometric identifiers (iris / facial / fingerprints) have been enrolled with ICA. In addition, for young Singapore citizens who wish to use the automated lanes but had collected their passports before turning six, they may enrol their biometrics at the staffed immigration counters (with the supervision of their parent/guardian).

In addition, Singapore citizens who intend to travel as tourists, are eligible to use the automated border control systems (eGates) when arriving in (or departing from) the following countries:

Country / Region	Type of entry	Duration of Allowed initial stay	Name of Immigration Authority	Name of ABC System	Ref
Australia	Electronic Travel Authority	90 days	Australian Border Force (ABF)	SmartGate	
Czech Republic	Visa not required	90 days	Ministry of the Interior (Czech Republic)	EasyGo Gate	
France	Visa not required	90 days (within any 180-day period in the Schengen Area)	Direction centrale de la police aux frontières (DCPAF)	PARAFE	
Hong Kong^{*}	Visa not required	90 days	Immigration Department (Hong Kong)	e-Channel	
Indonesia	Visa not required	30 days	Directorate General of Immigration	Autogate	
Italy	Visa not required	90 days (within any 180-day period in the Schengen Area)	Polizia di Frontiera	EGate (Italy)	
Japan^{*}	Visa not required	90 days	Immigration Services Agency	Automated Gates	
Malaysia	Visa not required	30 days	Jabatan Imigresen Malaysia	Autogate and MACS 2.0	
Netherlands^{2}	Visa not required	90 days	Immigratie en Naturalisatiedienst (IND)	Self-service passport control (eGates)	
New Zealand	Electronic Travel Authority	3 months	New Zealand Customs Service	eGate	
Portugal	Visa not required	90 days (within any 180-day period in the Schengen Area)	Serviço de Estrangeiros e Fronteiras (SEF)	RAPID4ALL	
South Korea^{1} ^{2}	Visa not required	3 months	Korea Immigration Service	SmartPass	
Taiwan^{1}	Visa not required	30 days	National Immigration Agency	e-Gate	
Thailand	Visa not required	30 days	Royal Thai Police Immigration Bureau	Automated Passport Control (APC)	
United Arab Emirates^{1}	Visa not required	30 days	Federal Authority for Identity, Citizenship, Customs and Port Security (FAICCPS)	Smart Gate	
United Kingdom	Visa not required	6 months	UK Border Force	EPassport gates	
United States^{1}	Visa Waiver Program	90 days	U.S. Customs and Border Protection (CBP)	Mobile Passport Control (MPC) and Global Entry	

_{* - Automated system enrollment eligibility is limited only to certain categories of travellers.}
_{1 - First-time visitors are required to enrol on their first visit and can only use the automated gates on their subsequent visits.}
_{2 - Use of the E-Gates is only valid when departing from the country and when the traveller is aged 16 & above.}

== Non-visa restrictions ==
=== Blank passport pages ===
Many countries require a minimum number of blank pages to be available in the passport being presented, typically one or two pages. Endorsement pages, which often appear after the visa pages, are not counted as being valid or available.

=== Vaccination ===
Cover of the new International Certificate of Vaccination issued by the Bureau of Quarantine in the Philippines since 2021

The African countries of Angola, Benin, Burkina Faso, Burundi, Cameroon, Central African Republic, Democratic Republic of the Congo, Republic of the Congo, Côte d'Ivoire, Gabon, Ghana, Guinea-Bissau, Mali, Niger, Sierra Leone and Togo, South Sudan and Uganda, along with French Guiana in South America, require all incoming passengers older than nine months to one year, to have a current International Certificate of Vaccination or Prophylaxis.

Some other countries require vaccination only if the passenger is coming from an infected area or has visited one recently or has transited for 12 hours in those countries: Algeria, Botswana, Cabo Verde, Chad, Djibouti, Egypt, Eswatini, Ethiopia, Gambia, Ghana, Guinea, Lesotho, Libya, Equatorial Guinea, Eritrea, Madagascar, Malawi, Mauritania, Mauritius, Mozambique, Namibia, Nigeria, Papua New Guinea, Seychelles, Somalia, South Africa, Sudan, Tunisia, Uganda, Tanzania, Zambia and Zimbabwe.

=== Passport validity length ===
Very few countries, such as Paraguay, just require a valid passport on arrival.

However many countries and groupings now require only an identity card – especially from their neighbours. Other countries may have special bilateral arrangements that depart from the generality of their passport validity length policies to shorten the period of passport validity required for each other's citizens or even accept passports that have already expired (but not been cancelled).

Some countries, such as Japan, Ireland and the United Kingdom, require a passport valid throughout the period of the intended stay.

In the absence of specific bilateral agreements, countries requiring passports to be valid for at least 6 more months on arrival include Afghanistan, Algeria, Anguilla, Bahrain, Bhutan, Botswana, British Virgin Islands, Brunei, Cambodia, Cameroon, Cape Verde, Cayman Islands, Central African Republic, Chad, Comoros, Costa Rica, Côte d'Ivoire, Curaçao, Ecuador, Egypt, El Salvador, Equatorial Guinea, Fiji, Gabon, Guinea Bissau, Guyana, Haiti, India, Indonesia, Iran, Iraq, Israel, Jordan, Kenya, Kiribati, Kuwait, Laos, Madagascar, Malaysia, Marshall Islands, Mongolia, Myanmar, Namibia, Nepal, Nicaragua, Nigeria, Oman, Palau, Papua New Guinea, Peru, Philippines, Qatar, Rwanda, Samoa, Saudi Arabia, Singapore, Solomon Islands, Somalia, Sri Lanka, Sudan, Suriname, Tanzania, Thailand, Timor-Leste, Tokelau, Tonga, Turkey, Tuvalu, Uganda, United Arab Emirates, Vanuatu, Venezuela, and Vietnam.

Countries requiring passports valid for at least 4 months on arrival include Micronesia and Zambia.

Countries requiring passports with a validity of at least 3 months beyond the date of intended departure include Azerbaijan, Bosnia and Herzegovina, Honduras, Montenegro, Nauru, Moldova and New Zealand. Similarly, the EEA countries of Iceland, Liechtenstein, Norway, all European Union countries (except Ireland) together with Switzerland also require 3 months validity beyond the date of the bearer's intended departure unless the bearer is an EEA or Swiss national.

Countries requiring passports valid for at least 3 months on arrival include Albania, North Macedonia, Panama, and Senegal.

Bermuda requires passports to be valid for at least 45 days upon entry.

Countries that require a passport validity of at least one month beyond the date of intended departure include Eritrea, Hong Kong, Lebanon, Macau, the Maldives and South Africa.

==== Maximum passport age ====
Countries of the Schengen area require non-EU passports to be less than 10 years old upon entry.

=== Criminal record ===
Some countries, including Australia, Canada, Fiji, New Zealand and the United States, routinely deny entry to non-citizens who have a criminal record, while others impose restrictions depending on the type of conviction and the length of the sentence.

=== Persona non grata ===
The government of a country can declare a diplomat persona non grata, banning them from entering the country or expelling them if they have already entered. In non-diplomatic use, the authorities of a country may also declare a foreigner persona non grata permanently or temporarily, usually because of unlawful activity.

=== Israeli stamps ===
Kuwait, Lebanon, Libya, and Yemen do not allow entry to people with passport stamps from Israel or whose passports have either a used or an unused Israeli visa, or where there is evidence of previous travel to Israel such as entry or exit stamps from neighbouring border posts in transit countries such as Jordan and Egypt.

To circumvent this Arab League boycott of Israel, the Israeli immigration services have now mostly ceased to stamp foreign nationals' passports on either entry to or exit from Israel (unless the entry is for some work-related purposes). Since 15 January 2013, Israel no longer stamps foreign passports at Ben Gurion Airport. Passports are still (as of 22 June 2017) stamped at Erez when passing into and out of Gaza.

Iran refuses admission to holders of passports containing an Israeli visa or stamp that is less than 12 months old.

=== Biometrics ===
Several countries mandate that all travellers, or all foreign travellers, be fingerprinted on arrival and will refuse admission to or even arrest travellers who refuse to comply. In some countries, such as the United States, this may apply even to transit passengers who merely wish to change planes rather than go landside.

Fingerprinting countries/regions include Afghanistan, Argentina, Brunei, Cambodia, China, Ethiopia, Ghana, Guinea, India, Japan, Kenya (both fingerprints and a photo are taken), Malaysia upon entry and departure, Mongolia, Saudi Arabia, the Schengen Area, Singapore, South Korea, Taiwan, Thailand, Uganda, the United Arab Emirates and the United States.

Many countries also require a photo be taken of people entering the country. The United States, which does not fully implement exit control formalities at its land frontiers (although long mandated by its own legislation), intends to implement facial recognition for passengers departing from international airports to identify people who overstay their visa.

Together with fingerprint and face recognition, iris scanning is one of three biometric identification technologies internationally standardised since 2006 by the International Civil Aviation Organization (ICAO) for use in e-passports and the United Arab Emirates conducts iris scanning on visitors who need to apply for a visa. The United States Department of Homeland Security has announced plans to greatly increase the biometric data it collects at US borders. In 2018, Singapore began trials of iris scanning at three land and maritime immigration checkpoints.

== See also ==
- Visa policy of Singapore
- Singapore passport
