= E-Channel =

Immigration system of Hong Kong

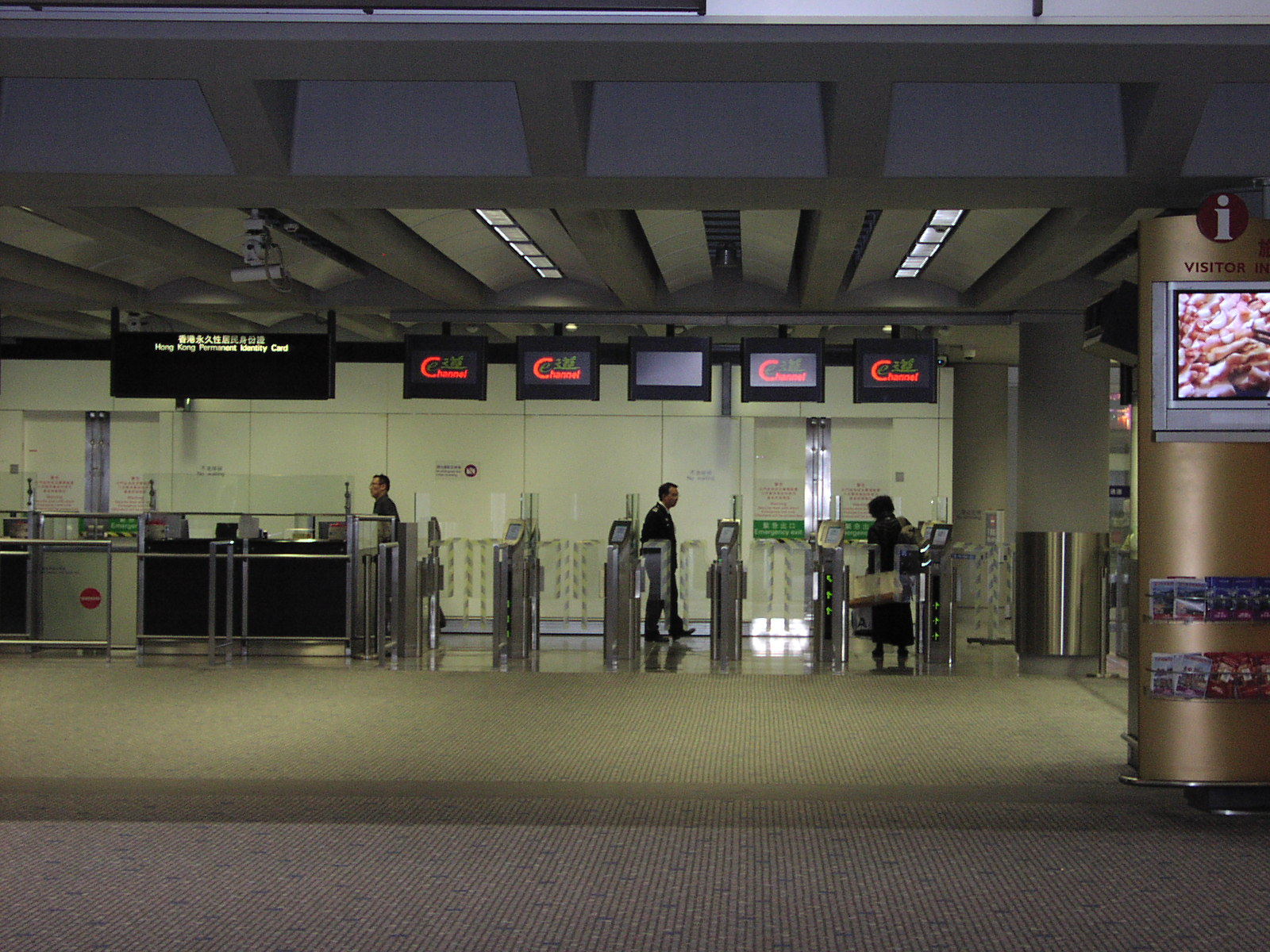
e-Channel machines at Hong Kong International Airport

e-Channel, also known as the Automated Passenger Clearance System, is an expedited border control system introduced by the Hong Kong Immigration Department in 2004, designed to speed up border immigration processes for residents of Hong Kong, Macau and frequent visitors to Hong Kong entering and exiting the territory whether it be by land, air or sea via the use of self-service kiosks employed at various border control points.

== Basic requirements ==
- A Hong Kong permanent resident aged 11 or above (using a smart identity card)
- A Hong Kong resident aged 11 or above holding a Document of Identity for Visa Purposes (using a smart identity card and carrying a valid Document of Identity for Visa Purposes)
- A person aged 11 or above who has the right to land or is on unconditional stay in Hong Kong (using a smart identity card)
- A non-permanent resident issued with a notification label (using a smart identity card and carrying a valid travel document)
- A registered cross-boundary primary school student under the age of 11 (using the enrolled valid travel document)
- A registered frequent visitor aged 18 or above (using the enrolled valid travel document)
- A registered Macau permanent resident aged 7 or above (using a Macau permanent identity card)
- A registered South Korean citizen aged 17 or above and enrolled under Smart Entry Service (SES) scheme (using the Republic of Korea Passport valid for at least 6 months and having no adverse record in the HKSAR)
- An enrolled holder of a Singaporean Passport aged 11 or above (using a Republic of Singapore Passport valid for at least 6 months, completed 2 trips in past 24 months and having no adverse record in the HKSAR)
- An enrolled holder of a German passport aged 18 or above (using a Federal Republic of Germany Passport valid for at least 6 months and having no adverse record in the HKSAR)
- An enrolled holder of an Australian Passport aged 16 or above (using an Australian Passport valid for at least 6 months and having no adverse record in the HKSAR)

The user upon entrance to the e-Channel inserts their Hong Kong Identity Card into the card reader or places their registered travel document or Macau Identity Card onto the document reader. The gate opens and the user steps in, scans their fingerprint and allows entry to Hong Kong.

== Locations ==
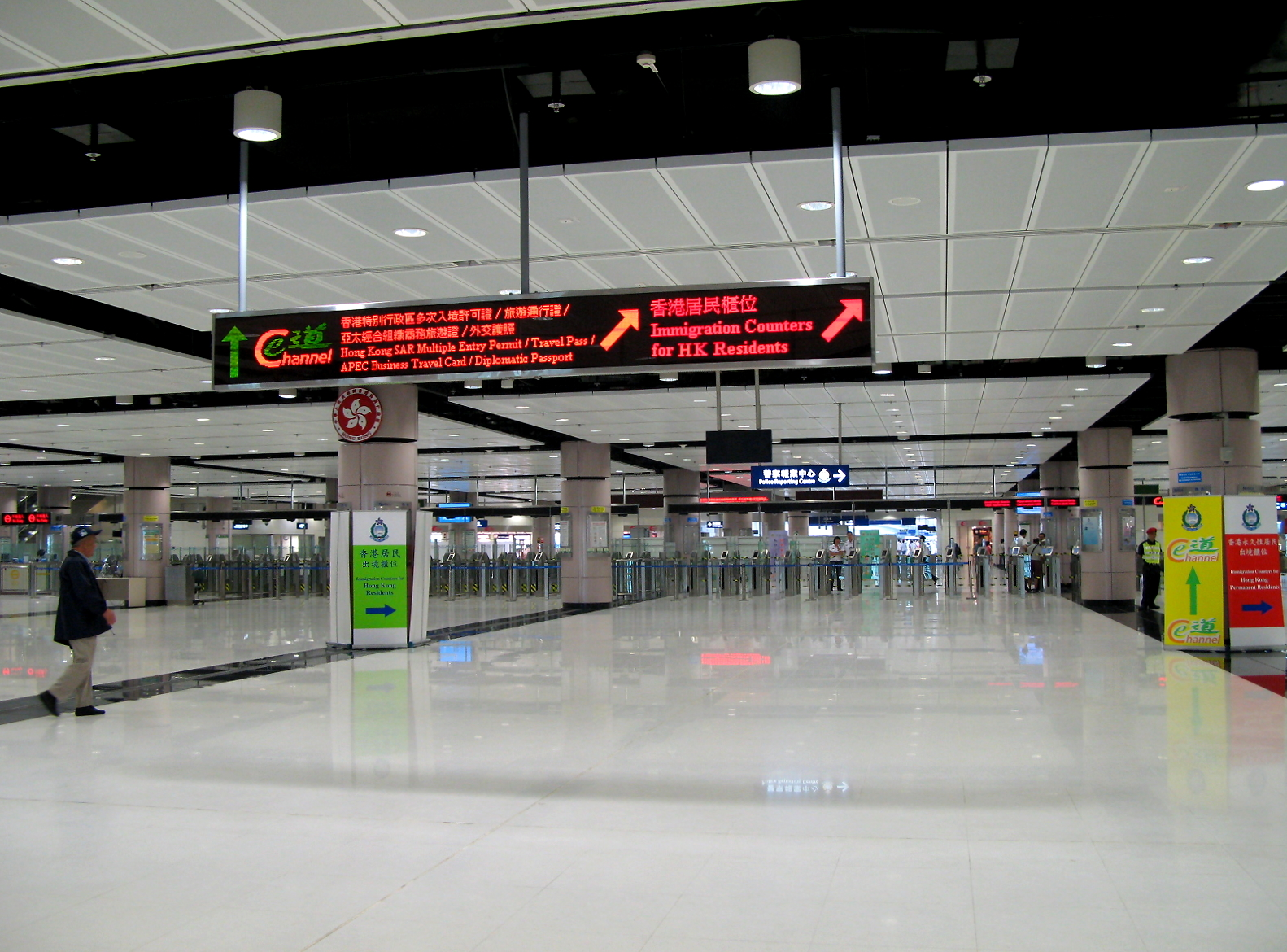
e-Channel machines at Lok Ma Chau Station

First made available on 16 December 2004 in Lo Wu Control Point, over the past several years the locations have expanded to include at the following border checkpoints:

Air

- Hong Kong International Airport
- Hong Kong–Macau Ferry Terminal (Heliport)

Land

- Lo Wu Control Point
- Lok Ma Chau Control Point
- Lok Ma Chau Spur Line Control Point
- Man Kam To Control Point
- Sha Tau Kok Control Point
- Shenzhen Bay Control Point
- Hong Kong–Zhuhai–Macau Bridge
- West Kowloon station (for cross-border railways)
- Heung Yuen Wai/Liantang Control Point
- Huanggang Port (3-gate system, requires enrollment on both side)

Sea

- Hong Kong China Ferry Terminal
- Hong Kong–Macau Ferry Terminal
- Kai Tak Cruise Terminal
- Tuen Mun Ferry Terminal

By allowing registered users to utilise the self-service kiosks to pass through Hong Kong immigration, processing time averages around 12 seconds making E-channels far more efficient than traditional immigration counters.

== Macau ==
Since its first inception where only Right to Abode Hong Kong Permanent Identity Card holders were permitted to use the self-service kiosks, the program expanded on 12 September 2006; allowing not only those of Right to Land or those with unconditional stay in Hong Kong but also to those residents and non-residents with notification labels to use the E-Channels.

The program was expanded further again on 10 December 2009 to allow holders of Macau Resident Identity Card to register for and use of the Hong Kong E-channels to enter and exit the territory.

Vice versa, Macau have reciprocated and have their set of E-Channels and Hong Kong ID Card holders can register for those as well. Border cities to Macau and Hong Kong on the Mainland China's side - Zhuhai and Shenzhen (respectively) have their set of E-channels for use of the Home Return Permit cards.

Example: A Hong Kong resident arrives at Lo Wu and passes through Hong Kong's E-Channel with his Hong Kong Identity Card allowing him to exit Hong Kong, upon approaching a border check point at Shenzhen, he uses his Home Return Permit on China's E-Channel to enter Mainland China. Thereby cutting down time compared with using traditional immigration counters.

Or

A Hong Kong resident departs from the Hong Kong-Macau Ferry Terminal clearing through Hong Kong immigration via E-channel, upon arrival of Macau's Outer Harbour Ferry Terminal, he can use his Hong Kong Identity Card to clear through Macau's set of E-Channels, instead of queuing up at immigration counters.

== Frequent Visitor Automated Passenger Clearance ==
Not only has Macau Resident Card holders been permitted to register for this program but frequent visitors to Hong Kong can register for this as well. The Frequent Visitor Automated Passenger Clearance would require a valid travel document with a multiple visit visa (if applicable), plus on one of the following documents:

- A valid HKSAR Travel Pass or
- An APEC Business Travel Card with the economy code ‘HKG’ or
- Frequent Flyer Programme Membership Card issued by an airline which has joined this arrangement

== e-Channel Service for foreign nationals ==
The Frequent Visitor program was further expanded to nationals of the following countries. Such arrangements are reciprocal and eligible HKSAR passport holders may also enrol for the respective automated border clearance schemes under these countries:

- Republic of Korea enrolled under Smart Entry Service (SES) scheme (Since 16 December 2013)
- Singapore (Since 22 September 2014)
- Germany (Since 1 November 2014)
- Australia (Since 20 June 2016)

== See also ==
- Smartgate - a similar system operated in Australia and New Zealand
- ePassport gates - a similar system operated in the United Kingdom
- Smart Entry Service - a similar system operated in the Republic of Korea
- Global Entry
- NEXUS
- Airport of Entry
- Port of entry
