= Automatic Systems (company) =

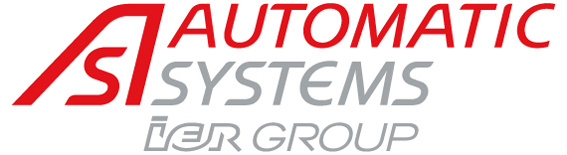
- Industry: Security equipment manufacturer
- Founded: 1969
- Headquarters: Wavre, Belgium
- Key people: Company founder Michel Coenraets; CEO: Maxime Boulvain
- Products: Access control systems
- Number of employees: 400 (2019)
- Subsidiaries: Automatic systems SAS-France; Automatic Systems Española SAU; Automatic Systems Equipment UK Ltd. Automatic Systems America Inc. Automatic Control Systems Inc.
- Website: www.automatic-systems.com

Automatic Systems, a subsidiary of Bolloré Group, is a company, specialising in the automation of secure entrance control. The company designs and manufactures vehicle, pedestrian and passenger access control equipment. According to the IMS research, titled "The World Market for Pedestrian Entrance Control Equipment" (2013), Automatic Systems is ranked No. 1 as speed gates supplier for Mass Transit Applications in the world and for Intrabuilding in EMEA. Headquartered in Wavre, the Belgian province of the Walloon Brabant situated close to Brussels, the capital of Belgium, Automatic Systems operates through its subsidiaries located in France, the UK, Spain, Canada and the USA. and a network of worldwide distributors. The company exports 90% of its production through a network of international distribution partners. Its net sales topped €71.9 million in 2016.

Its production sites are located in Wavre and Gembloux (Belgium), Persan (France) and Brossard (Montreal-Canada).

== History ==
Automatic Systems is a Belgian company founded in 1969 by the Belgian entrepreneur Michel Coenraets. With the help of friends and family and 1 million BEF as start-up capital, Michel Coenraets started Automatic Systems in a 15m2 garage in the suburbs of Brussels. It is in this small garage that the first vehicle barriers were developed using the crankshaft-rod principle, a reference in the barrier and gate sectors ever since. These barriers equipped the parking of the newly inaugurated site of the Department Store Innovation in Brussels and the new off-street Parking 44 site in 1969. That year, the company also supplied a prototype of the pedestrian turnstile to the Brussels metro. Within 2 years, all new Brussels metro lines were equipped by Automatic Systems turnstiles. At the end of the first fiscal year, the company employed 5 people and generated a revenue of 4 million BEF.

In 1971, marked the beginning of Automatic Systems’ international expansion with the supply of 101 vehicle parking barriers to the new Frankfurt Airport in Germany, followed by various important French contracts with the French railways SNCF, and the prestigious Centre Beaubourg in Paris which chose Automatic Systems to equip its parking.

In 1974, the company moved its production and offices to Wavre (Walloon Brabant-Belgium), from where it still manages its business, and opened its first subsidiary in Paris. Montreal in Canada and Barcelona in Spain followed in 1986. The UK subsidiary was opened in 1994.

In 1998, Automatic Systems bought the barrier division of ASEA-ABB known under the name of BCA.

In 2002, Automatic Systems was acquired by Bolloré thus reporting to the IER Group. Every day more than 90 million people use Automatic Systems equipment worldwide.

In 2016, the Automatic Systems group exported 90% of its production worldwide and achieved a total turnover of 71.91.9 million euros.

In 2019, Automatic Systems has 410 employees and 80 partner distributors spread all over the world.

== Crankshaft-rod principle ==
Automatic Systems has been the first company to use the principle of the crankshaft rod (movement transmission by crankshaft-rod) in the development and manufacturing of automatic barriers and gates. This system, already in use in numerous applications, has become a reference in access control equipment for many years ahead. The advantages of a movement by crankshaft-rod are twofold: it allows a perfect mechanical locking of the boom in both end positions (open and close), thus preventing any external influence (e.g. attempt to raise the boom...); it ensures a smooth speed acceleration of the boom till 45° and a speed deceleration up to 90° avoiding shocks at the beginning and the end of the movement (see below sample of mechanism with crankshaft - rod device.)

== Products and markets ==
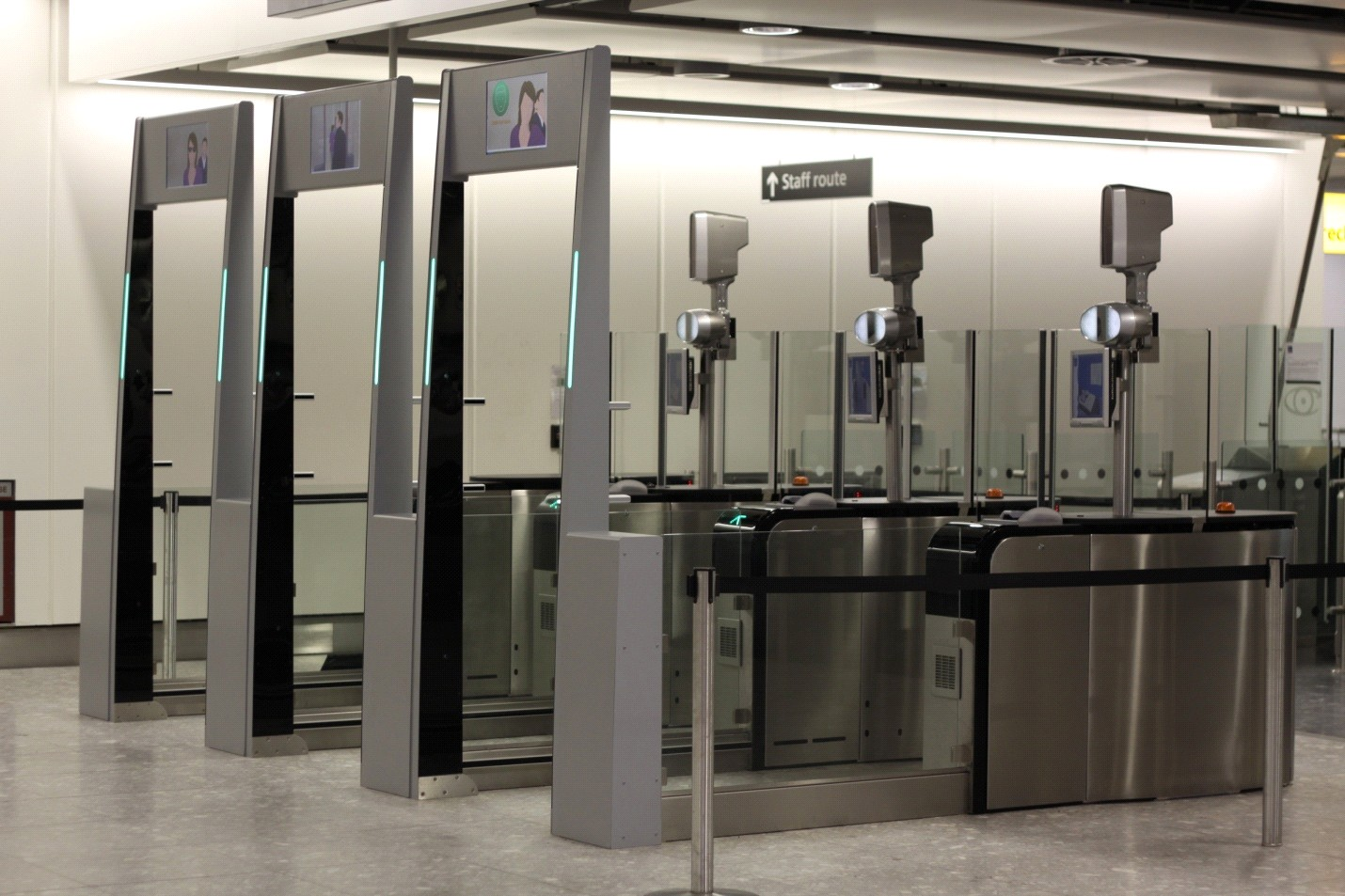
Heathrow Terminal 4 ePassport gates

Vehicle access control

Rising barriers, road blockers and bollards are mainly installed in toll stations, at the entrances and exits of parking and for traffic management and perimeter access.

Pedestrian access control

Turnstiles, swing gates and security doors are installed in the hall of office buildings, public and private administrations, industries, leisure and sports centers.

Passenger access control

Automatic access control gates, ePassport gates and anti-reflow doors are mainly installed in Metro/Tram stations, airports, railway, bus and ferry stations.
