= Iris Recognition Immigration System =

Iris Recognition Immigration System (IRIS) was an initiative, launched in 2004, to provide automated clearance through UK immigration for certain frequent travellers. It functioned in "one-to-all" identification mode, searching a large database of some million enrolled frequent travellers to see if anyone matched the presenting iris. The passenger was not asked to assert any identity, e.g. by presenting a passport or ID card which would then require only a "one-to-one" verification test against that single enrolled identity. Thus IRIS exploited the great robustness of iris recognition against making false matches, since (unlike weak biometrics such as face recognition) it could survive the vast number of opportunities to make false matches when searching a large database, instead of only needing to test just a single asserted identity. It was decommissioned in September 2013 in favour of e-passport entry using biometric data stored on the e-passport chip, which requires only a single asserted identity to be tested and thus could function using weaker biometrics in the simple "one-to-one" verification mode.

IRIS relied on biometric technology to authenticate identity and was part of the e-borders initiative of the UK Government. The main factor behind the decision to decommission IRIS was the cost of staffing the enrolment offices in airport terminals, whereas face recognition only required submitting a passport-type photograph acquired in a photo-booth without the need for personal presentation to airport enrolment staff.

The entire scheme, including cost of scrappage, cost £11.8 million.

== Procedure ==
Enrolled passengers could enter the UK through a special automated immigration control barrier incorporating an iris recognition camera. These barriers were located in certain Immigration arrival halls and form part of immigration and passport control.

== Availability ==
Enrolment took place in the airport departure lounge where an immigration officer assessed eligibility and enrols qualifying persons. Those who qualified to participate in the scheme had both their eyes photographed in order to capture their iris patterns. This data was then stored securely alongside their personal details.

Originally IRIS was rolled out at London Heathrow, London Gatwick, Birmingham and Manchester in 2004 for an intended deployment period of five years. As of February 2013, IRIS was only available at Heathrow Terminals 3 and 5, all other barriers being decommissioned. These last operational barriers were decommissioned on 15 and 16 September 2013, respectively, after the original deployment plan for five years had been doubled to nearly ten years.

== Eligibility ==
The following travellers were eligible to enrol:

- Persons over 18 years of age
- British citizens or people with a right of abode in the UK, or nationals of an EEA state or Swiss nationals
- Permanent residents of the United Kingdom (e.g. indefinite leave to remain)
- Valid entry clearance holders (visa holders) with at least 2 months of validity left on the entry clearance
- Short term visitors entering the United Kingdom (not needing visas) who were granted entry as a visitor on at least two occasions in the last six months, or four occasions in the last 12 months
- Exempt from UK immigration controls or permitted to enter or remain in the UK for more than six months and have more than two months left of that permission
- Families of EEA state or Swiss nationals based in the UK or exempt from immigration controls and based in the UK

== See also ==
- ePassport gates (another type of automated self-service barriers that replaced IRIS and is used by the UK Border Force at a number of airports and train stations)
- Iris recognition

== Further Information ==
- Latest IRIS Information from UK Border Agency
