= Visa requirements for Seychellois citizens =

Administrative entry restrictions

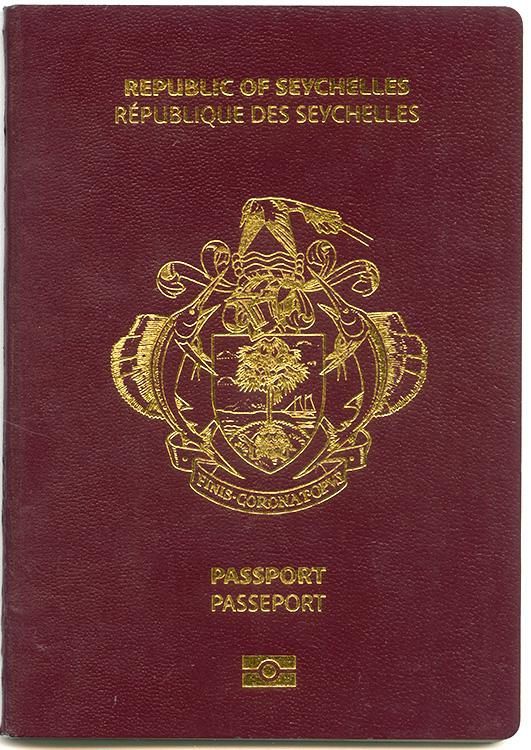
A Seychellois passport

Visa requirements for Seychellois citizens are administrative entry restrictions by the authorities of other states placed on citizens of Seychelles. As of today, Seychellois citizens can visit either without a visa or with either a visa on arrival or travel authorization 154 countries and territories, incl. Russia, China, the United Kingdom, South Korea, Singapore, Turkey, Iran, Kazakhstan, Bangladesh and Nigeria, as well as European Union member countries like France, Germany, Italy, Spain, the Netherlands and Ireland, ranking the Seychellois passport 22nd in terms of travel freedom, and best ranking African country, according to the Henley Passport Index.

As of November 2024, Brunei, Grenada, Mauritius, South Korea and Seychelles are the only countries whose citizens may travel without a visa to China, Russia, Schengen Area and the United Kingdom.

== Visa requirements map ==
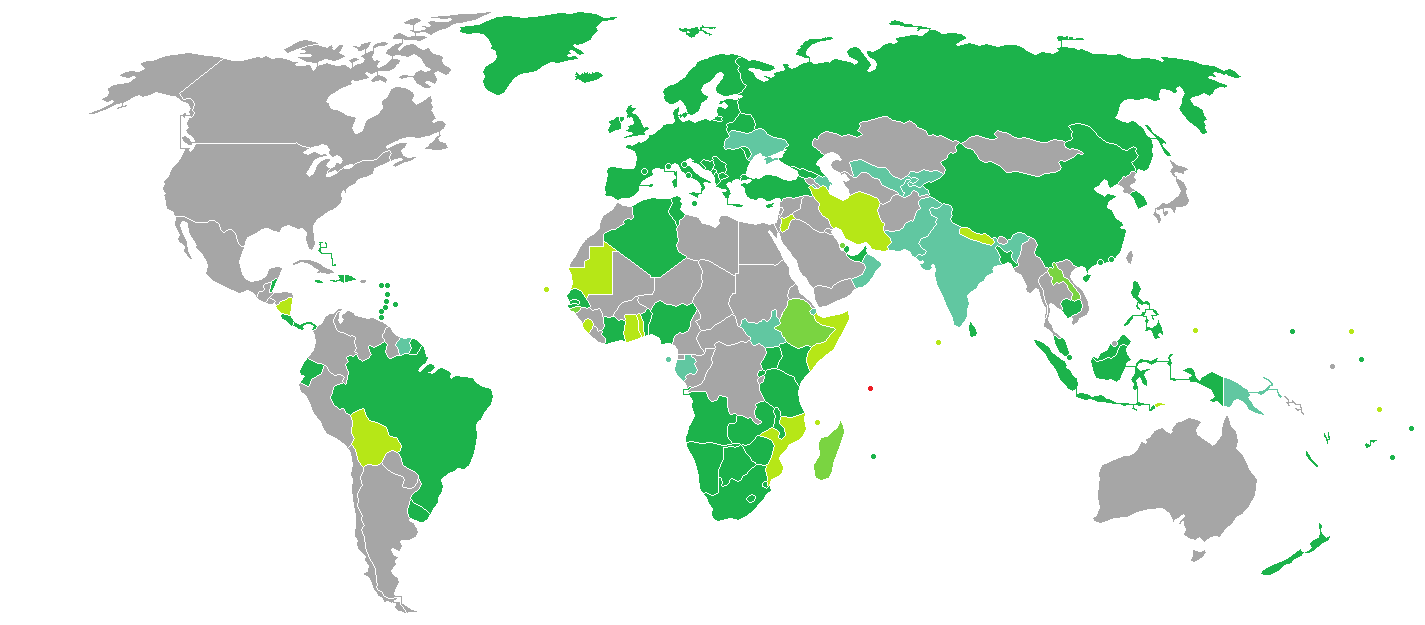
Visa requirements for Seychellois citizens Seychelles Visa free access Visa on arrival eVisa Visa available both on arrival or online Visa required

== Visa requirements ==
Country	Visa requirement	Allowed stay	Notes (excluding departure fees)
Afghanistan	eVisa	30 days	Visa is not required in case born in Afghanistan or can proof that one of their parents is a national of Afghanistan or born in Afghanistan.; e-Visa : Visitors must arrive at Kabul International (KBL).
Albania	Visa not required	90 days	
Algeria	Visa not required	90 days	
Andorra	Visa not required		
Angola	Visa not required	30 days	For a maximum total stay of 90 days within year period.
Antigua and Barbuda	Visa not required	3 months	
Argentina	Visa required		The AVE (High Speed Travel) is open to Seychellois citizens holding valid, current ordinary passports traveling to Argentina for tourism. To do so, they must hold a valid category B2/J/B1/O/P (P1-P2-P3)/E/H-1B visa issued by the United States of America.
Armenia	Visa required		
Australia and territories	Visa required		May apply online (Online Visitor e600 visa).
Austria	Visa not required	3 months	3 months during a 6 months period following the date of first entry in the Schengen Area
Azerbaijan	eVisa	30 days	
Bahamas	Visa not required	3 months	
Bahrain	eVisa	14 days	
Bangladesh	Visa not required	90 days	
Barbados	Visa not required	6 months	
Belarus	Visa not required	30 days	Must arrive and depart via Minsk National Airport.
Belgium	Visa not required	3 months	3 months during a 6 months period following the date of first entry in the Schengen Area
Belize	Visa not required		
Benin	Visa not required	90 days	
Bhutan	Visa required		
Bolivia	Visa on arrival	90 days	
Bosnia and Herzegovina	Visa not required	90 days	90 days within any 6 month period
Botswana	Visa not required	90 days	
Brazil	Visa not required	90 days	90 days per 180-day period
Brunei	Visa required		
Bulgaria	Visa not required	3 months	3 months during a 6 months period in the Schengen Area
Burkina Faso	Visa required		
Burundi	Visa on arrival	1 month	
Cambodia	Visa not required	14 days	
Cameroon	Visa required		
Canada	Visa required		Seychellois who have held a Canadian visa in the last 10 years or who hold a valid US non-immigrant visa can obtain an eTA instead of a visa when traveling to Canada by air.
Cape Verde	Visa on arrival		
Central African Republic	Visa required		
Chad	Visa required		
Chile	Visa required		
China	Visa not required	30 days	
Colombia	Visa required		
Comoros	Visa on arrival		
Republic of the Congo	Visa required		
Democratic Republic of the Congo	Visa required		
Costa Rica	Visa not required	90 days	
Côte d'Ivoire	Visa not required	3 months	
Croatia	Visa not required	90 days	90 days within any 180 day period in the Schengen Area
Cuba	Tourist card required		
Cyprus	Visa not required	90 days	90 days within any 6 month period
Czech Republic	Visa not required	3 months	3 months during a 6 months period following the date of first entry in the Schengen Area
Denmark	Visa not required	3 months	3 months during a 6 months period following the date of first entry in the Schengen Area
Djibouti	eVisa	31 days	
Dominica	Visa not required	6 months	
Dominican Republic	Visa not required	90 days	
Ecuador	Visa not required	90 days	
Egypt	Visa on arrival	30 days	
El Salvador	Visa required		
Equatorial Guinea	Visa required		
Eritrea	Visa required		
Estonia	Visa not required	3 months	3 months during a 6 months period following the date of first entry in the Schengen Area
Eswatini	Visa not required	30 days	
Ethiopia	eVisa / Visa on arrival	up to 90 days	Visa on arrival is obtainable only at Addis Ababa Bole International Airport.; e-Visa holders must arrive via Addis Ababa Bole International Airport.; e-Visa is available for 30 or 90 days.
Fiji	Visa not required	4 months	
Finland	Visa not required	3 months	3 months during a 6 months period following the date of first entry in the Schengen Area
France	Visa not required	3 months	3 months during a 6 months period following the date of first entry in the Schengen Area
Gabon	eVisa		Electronic visa holders must arrive via Libreville International Airport.
Gambia	Visa not required	90 days	Must obtain an entry clearance from the Gambian Immigration prior to travel
Georgia	Visa not required	1 year	
Germany	Visa not required	3 months	3 months during a 6 months period following the date of first entry in the Schengen Area
Ghana	Visa not required	90 days	
Greece	Visa not required	3 months	3 months during a 6 months period following the date of first entry in the Schengen Area
Grenada	Visa not required	3 months	
Guatemala	Visa required		
Guinea	Visa required		
Guinea-Bissau	eVisa / Visa on arrival	90 days	
Guyana	Visa required		
Haiti	Visa not required	90 days	
Honduras	Visa required		
Hungary	Visa not required	3 months	3 months during a 6 months period following the date of first entry in the Schengen Area
Iceland	Visa not required	3 months	3 months during a 6 months period following the date of first entry in the Schengen Area
India	e-Visa	60 days	e-Visa holders must arrive via 32 designated airports (Note: Ahmedabad; Amritsar; Bagdogra; Bengaluru; Bhubaneswar; Chandigarh; Chennai; Coimbatore; Delhi; Gaya; Goa-Dabolim; Goa-Manohar; Guwahati; Hyderabad; Indore; Jaipur; Kannur; Kochi; Kolkata; Kozhikode; Lucknow; Madurai; Mangaluru; Mumbai; Nagpur; Port Blair; Pune; Surat; Thiruvananthapuram; Tiruchirappalli; Varanasi; Visakhapatnam) or 5 designated seaports. (Note: Chennai; Cochin; Mormugao (Goa); Mumbai; Mangalore); An Indian e-Tourist Visa may only be obtained twice within 1 calendar year.; Foreigners of Pakistani origin or who hold a Pakistani Passport are not eligible for an e-Visa. Foreigners who are not Pakistani nationals, but whose parents or grandparents (either paternal or maternal) were born in, or were permanent residents in Pakistan, are also not eligible for an e-Visa.
Indonesia	Visa on arrival	30 days	
Iran	Visa not required	15 days	
Iraq	Visa required		
Ireland	Visa not required		
Israel	Visa required		
Italy	Visa not required	3 months	3 months during a 6 months period following the date of first entry in the Schengen Area
Jamaica	Visa not required		
Japan	Visa required		
Jordan	Visa on arrival		Conditions apply
Kazakhstan	Visa not required	30 days	90 days within any 180-day period.
Kenya	Electronic Travel Authorisation	3 months	
Kiribati	Visa not required	30 days	
North Korea	Visa required		
South Korea	Electronic Travel Authorization	30 days	
Kuwait	Visa required		
Kyrgyzstan	eVisa		eVisa holders must arrive via Manas International Airport.
Laos	eVisa / Visa on arrival	30 days	18 (Note: Savannakhet Airport; Lanetoui - Mengkang (China); Meuangmom - Wan Pong (Myanmar); Banvang - Ban Khok Phai (Thailand); Namngeun - Huay Kon (Thailand); Paksan - Bueng Kan (Thailand); Paktaphan - Pak Saeng (Thailand); Pangmon - Ban Huak (Thailand); Phoudou (Thailand); Dak ta ock - Nam Giang (Vietnam); La Lai (Vietnam); Namkan (Vietnam); Namphao - Cau Treo (Vietnam); Namsoy - Na Meo (Vietnam); Naphao - Cha Lo (Vietnam); Pahang - Long Sap (Vietnam); Panghok - Tây Trang (Vietnam); Phoukeua - Bo Y (Vietnam)) of the 33 border crossings are only open to regular visa holders.; e-Visa may be used to enter Laos through the Luang Prabang, Pakse and Vientiane international airports, 3 Thai-Lao Friendship Bridges (Note: Vientiane (Friendship Bridge 1); Savannakhet (Friendship Bridge 2); Bokeo (Friendship Bridge 4)), in Boten (road and railroad), and in Vientiane (at Khamsavath railway station).; Visa on arrival is available at the Luang Prabang, Pakse and Vientiane international airports, 4 Thai-Lao Friendship Bridges (Note: Vientiane (Friendship Bridge 1); Savannakhet (Friendship Bridge 2); Khammouane (Friendship Bridge 3); Bokeo (Friendship Bridge 4)) and 7 border crossings. (Note: Nongnokkheane - Trapeang Kriel (Cambodia); Boten - Bo han (China); Golden Triangle/Samliemkham (Thailand); Khamsavath railway station (Thailand); Namheuang - Ban Na Kraseng (Thailand); Vang tao - Chongmek (Thailand); Dansavan - Lao Bảo (Vietnam))
Latvia	Visa not required	3 months	3 months during a 6 months period following the date of first entry in the Schengen Area
Lebanon	Visa required		In addition to a visa, an approval should be obtained from the Immigration department of the General Directorate of General Security (La Surete Generale).
Lesotho	Visa not required	90 days	
Liberia	Visa required		
Libya	eVisa	30 days	
Liechtenstein	Visa not required	3 months	3 months during a 6 months period following the date of first entry in the Schengen Area
Lithuania	Visa not required	3 months	3 months during a 6 months period following the date of first entry in the Schengen Area
Luxembourg	Visa not required	3 months	3 months during a 6 months period following the date of first entry in the Schengen Area
Madagascar	eVisa / Visa on arrival	90 days	
Malawi	Visa not required	90 days	
Malaysia	Visa not required	3 months	
Maldives	Free visa on arrival	30 days	
Mali	Visa required		
Malta	Visa not required	3 months	3 months during a 6 months period following the date of first entry in the Schengen Area
Marshall Islands	Visa on arrival	90 days	
Mauritania	Visa on arrival		Available at Nouakchott–Oumtounsy International Airport.
Mauritius	Visa not required	90 days	
Mexico	Visa required		Visa is not required for holders of a valid visa of Canada, US, UK or a Schengen State and Permanent residence of Canada, Chile, Colombia, Schengen State, Japan, UK, US.; Entry may be refused by immigration officials for individuals who were previously denied a US visa, even if holding a valid Mexican visa.
Micronesia	Visa not required	30 days	
Moldova	Visa not required	90 days	90 days within any 180 day period
Monaco	Visa not required		
Mongolia	e-Visa	30 days	
Montenegro	Visa not required	90 days	
Morocco	Visa required		
Mozambique	Visa on arrival	30 days	
Myanmar	Visa required		
Namibia	Visa not required	3 months	3 months within a year
Nauru	Visa required		
Nepal	Visa on arrival	90 days	
Netherlands	Visa not required	3 months	3 months during a 6 months period following the date of first entry in the Schengen Area
New Zealand	Electronic Travel Authority	3 months	International Visitor Conservation and Tourism Levy must be paid upon requesting an Electronic Travel Authority.; Holders of an Australian Permanent Resident Visa or Resident Return Visa may be granted a New Zealand Resident Visa on arrival permitting indefinite stay (pursuant to the Trans-Tasman Travel Arrangement), subject to meeting character requirements and obtaining an Electronic Travel Authority prior to departure. Such travellers are not required to pay the International Visitor Conservation and Tourism Levy.
Nicaragua	Visa on arrival	90 days	
Niger	Visa required		
Nigeria	Visa not required	90 days	
North Macedonia	Visa not required	90 days	
Norway	Visa not required	3 months	3 months during a 6 months period following the date of first entry in the Schengen Area
Oman	eVisa	30 days	
Pakistan	Online Visa		Online Visa eligible.
Palau	Free visa on arrival	30 days	
Panama	Visa not required	180 days	
Papua New Guinea	Easy Visitor Permit	30 days	
Paraguay	Visa required		
Peru	Visa required		
Philippines	Visa not required	30 days	
Poland	Visa not required	3 months	3 months during a 6 months period following the date of first entry in the Schengen Area
Portugal	Visa not required	3 months	3 months during a 6 months period following the date of first entry in the Schengen Area
Qatar	Visa not required	90 days	
Romania	Visa not required	3 months	3 months during a 6 months period in the Schengen Area
Russia	Visa not required	90 days	30 days, for a maximum total stay of 90 days within one calendar year period
Rwanda	Visa not required	90 days	
Saint Kitts and Nevis	Visa not required	6 months	
Saint Lucia	Visa on arrival	6 weeks	
Saint Vincent and the Grenadines	Visa not required	1 month	
Samoa	Visa not required	60 days	
San Marino	Visa not required		
São Tomé and Príncipe	eVisa		
Saudi Arabia	eVisa	90 days	
Senegal	Visa on arrival	90 days	
Serbia	Visa not required	90 days	
Sierra Leone	Visa on arrival		
Singapore	Visa not required	30 days	
Slovakia	Visa not required	3 months	3 months during a 6 months period following the date of first entry in the Schengen Area
Slovenia	Visa not required	3 months	3 months during a 6 months period following the date of first entry in the Schengen Area
Solomon Islands	Visa required		
Somalia	Visa on arrival	30 days	All visitors must have an approved Electronic Visa (eTAS) before the start of their journey.
South Africa	Visa not required	30 days	
South Sudan	eVisa		Obtainable online; Printed visa authorization must be presented at the time of travel
Spain	Visa not required	3 months	3 months during a 6 months period following the date of first entry in the Schengen Area
Sri Lanka	Visa not required	90 days	60 days, up to 90 in a single year
Sudan	Visa required		
Suriname	Visa not required	90 days	
Sweden	Visa not required	3 months	3 months during a 6 months period following the date of first entry in the Schengen Area
Switzerland	Visa not required	3 months	3 months during a 6 months period following the date of first entry in the Schengen Area
Syria	Visa required		
Tajikistan	eVisa	45 days	
Tanzania	Visa not required	90 days	
Thailand	Visa on arrival	15 days	
Timor-Leste	Visa on arrival	30 days	
Togo	Visa on arrival	7 days	
Tonga	Free visa on arrival	31 days	
Trinidad and Tobago	Visa not required		
Tunisia	Visa not required	3 months	
Turkey	Visa not required	90 days	
Turkmenistan	Visa required		
Tuvalu	Visa on arrival	1 month	
Uganda	Visa not required	3 months	
Ukraine	Visa required		e-Visa is currently suspended due to Russian invasion of Ukraine.
United Arab Emirates	Visa not required	90 days	
United Kingdom and Crown dependencies	Electronic Travel Authorisation	6 months	
United States	Visa required		
Uruguay	Visa not required	90 days	
Uzbekistan	eVisa	30 days	5-day visa-free transit at the international airports if holding a confirmed onward ticket for a flight to a third country.
Vanuatu	Visa not required	30 days	
Vatican City	Visa not required		
Venezuela	Visa required		
Vietnam	e-Visa		e-Visa is valid for 90 days and multiple entry.
Yemen	Visa required		
Zambia	Visa not required	90 days	
Zimbabwe	Visa not required	3 months	

== Dependent, Disputed, or Restricted territories ==
Unrecognized or partially recognized countries

Territory	Conditions of access	Notes
Abkhazia	Visa required	
Kosovo	Visa not required	90 days
Northern Cyprus	Visa not required	
Palestine	Visa not required	Arrival by sea to Gaza Strip not allowed.
Sahrawi Arab Democratic Republic		Undefined visa regime in the Western Sahara controlled territory.
Somaliland	Visa on arrival	30 days for 30 US dollars, payable on arrival.
South Ossetia	Visa not required	Multiple entry visa to Russia and three day prior notification are required to enter South Ossetia.
Taiwan	Visa required	
Transnistria	Visa not required	Registration required after 24h.

Dependent and autonomous territories

Territory	Conditions of access	Notes
China
Hong Kong	Visa not required	90 days
Macau	Visa not required	30 days
Denmark
Faroe Islands	Visa not required	
Greenland	Visa not required	
France
French Guiana	Visa not required	
French Polynesia	Visa not required	
(France) French West Indies	Visa not required	Includes overseas departments of Guadeloupe and Martinique and overseas collectivities of Saint Barthélemy and Saint Martin.
Mayotte	Visa not required	
New Caledonia	Visa not required	
Réunion	Visa not required	
Saint Pierre and Miquelon	Visa not required	
Wallis and Futuna	Visa not required	
Netherlands
Aruba	Visa not required	90 days
Caribbean Netherlands	Visa not required	90 days. Includes Bonaire, Sint Eustatius and Saba.
Curaçao	Visa not required	90 days
Sint Maarten	Visa not required	90 days
New Zealand
Cook Islands	Visa not required	31 days
Niue	Visa not required	30 days
Tokelau	Visa required	
United Kingdom
Akrotiri and Dhekelia	Visa not required	Stays longer than 28 days per 12-month period require a permit.
Anguilla	Visa not required	Holders of a valid visa issued by the United Kingdom do not require a visa.
Bermuda	Visa not required	
British Indian Ocean Territory	Special permit required	Special permit required.
British Virgin Islands	Visa not required	
Cayman Islands	Visa not required	
Falkland Islands	Visa required	
Gibraltar	Visa not required	
Montserrat	Visa not required	
Pitcairn Islands	Visa not required	14 days visa free and landing fee 35 USD or tax of 5 USD if not going ashore.
Ascension Island	eVisa	3 months within any year period
Saint Helena	Visitor's Pass required	Visitor's Pass granted on arrival valid for 4/10/21/60/90 days for 12/14/16/20/25 pound sterling.
Tristan da Cunha	Permission required	Permission to land required for 15/30 pounds sterling (yacht/ship passenger) for Tristan da Cunha Island or 20 pounds sterling for Gough Island, Inaccessible Island or Nightingale Islands.
South Georgia and the South Sandwich Islands	Permit required	Pre-arrival permit from the Commissioner required (72 hours/1 month for 110/160 pounds sterling).
Turks and Caicos Islands	Visa not required	Holders of a valid visa issued by Canada, United Kingdom or the USA do not required a visa for a maximum stay of 90 days.
United States
American Samoa	Visa required	
Guam	Visa required	
Northern Mariana Islands	Visa required	
Puerto Rico	Visa required	
U.S. Virgin Islands	Visa required	
Antarctica and adjacent islands
Special permits required for Bouvet Island, British Antarctic Territory, French Southern and Antarctic Lands, Argentine Antarctica, (Australia) Australian Antarctic Territory, (Antártica Chilena Province) Chilean Antarctic Territory, (Australia) Heard Island and McDonald Islands, (Norway) Peter I Island, (Norway) Queen Maud Land, (New Zealand) Ross Dependency.

== See also ==
- Visa policy of Seychelles
- Seychellois passport
- Foreign relations of Seychelles
