= Singaporean nationality law =

Constitution of the Republic of Singapore Part X Citizenship

Parliament of Singapore
- Citation: Constitution of the Republic of Singapore
- Territorial extent: Singapore
- Enacted by: 1st Parliament of Singapore
- Commenced: 9 August 1965

Repeals
- Singapore Citizenship Ordinance 1957
- Status: Amended

Singaporean nationality law details the conditions by which a person holds Singapore nationality. The primary law governing nationality requirements is the Constitution of Singapore, which came into force on 9 August 1965.

Individuals born to at least one Singapore citizen parent can apply for citizenship at birth, regardless of where the birth occurred. Birth in Singapore by itself does not make a child eligible for citizenship. Foreign nationals may become Singapore citizens after completing a residence requirement (normally 10 years) and renouncing any previous nationalities. Holding another nationality while being a Singapore citizen over the age of 21 is disallowed, and a Singapore citizen will lose their citizenship if they acquire another nationality.

Singapore was briefly a constituent part of Malaysia and local residents were Malaysian citizens from 1963 to 1965. Prior to this, Singapore was a colony of the British Empire and municipal citizens were British subjects. Although the country gained independence in 1965 and Singaporeans no longer hold Malaysian nor British nationality, they continue to hold favoured status in the United Kingdom; as Commonwealth citizens, Singapore citizens are eligible to vote in UK elections and serve in public office there if they hold indefinite leave to remain.

== History ==
Modern Singapore was founded in 1819 and soon after merged with Penang and Malacca to form the Straits Settlements in 1826. After their incorporation as Crown dominions in 1858, British nationality law applied to the Straits Settlements, as was the case elsewhere in the British Empire. Singaporeans and all other imperial citizens were British subjects; any person born in Singapore, the United Kingdom, or anywhere else within Crown dominions was a natural-born British subject.

In the rest of British Malaya outside of the Straits Settlements, local Malay rulers were given limited autonomy in exchange for accepting British suzerainty. Subjects of the rulers in the Federated Malay States and Unfederated Malay States were considered British protected persons. Although Britain held jurisdiction in all of British Malaya, domestic law treated the Malay states as foreign territory. British protected persons were treated as aliens in the United Kingdom, but both British subjects and protected persons could be issued British passports. Protected persons could not travel to the UK without first requesting permission, but were afforded the same consular protection as British subjects when travelling outside of the Empire. A person with connections both to directly governed portions of British Malaya and one of the Malay states could be a British subject and British protected person simultaneously.

British nationality law during this time was uncodified and did not have a standard set of regulations, relying instead on past precedent and common law. Until the mid-19th century, it was unclear whether rules for naturalisation in the United Kingdom were applicable elsewhere in the Empire. Each colony had wide discretion in developing their own procedures and requirements for naturalisation up to that point. In 1847, the Imperial Parliament formalised a clear distinction between subjects who naturalised in the UK and those who did so in other territories. Individuals who naturalised in the UK were deemed to have received the status by imperial naturalisation, which was valid throughout the Empire. Those naturalising in colonies were said to have gone through local naturalisation and were given subject status valid only within the relevant territory; a subject who locally naturalised in the Straits Settlements was a British subject there, but not in Bengal or New South Wales. When travelling outside of the Empire, British subjects who were locally naturalised in a colony were still entitled to imperial protection.

Singapore citizenship was first granted in 1957. Singapore Citizenship Ordinance 1957 which commenced on 1 November 1957 provided Singapore citizenship to all people who were born in Singapore (except children of diplomats and enemy aliens). People who were born in the Federation of Malaya or citizens of the United Kingdom and Colonies who had been resident for two years, and others who had been resident for eight years were able to register or naturalise as Singapore citizen. When Singapore gained internal self-government in 1959, Singapore became an independent Commonwealth country for the purpose of British nationality law. From then on, Singaporean passports had the unusual nationality status of "British subject: citizen of the State of Singapore" instead of the usual "British subject: citizen of the United Kingdom and Colonies". There are treaties signed by the United Kingdom during this period that specifically mention this unusual nationality status.

In 1963, Singaporean nationality law was incorporated into the new Constitution of the State of Singapore. The constitution repealed the 1957 Ordinance, and all persons who were citizens as of 16 September 1963 by virtue of the Ordinance continued to be Singapore citizens. All Singaporean citizens became Malaysian citizens on 16 September 1963 upon Singapore's merger with Malaysia on that date. Malaysian nationality law provided that Singapore citizenship to continue to exist as a subnational citizenship. Singapore citizenship continued to be legislated by the Legislative Assembly of Singapore, subject to the approval of the Parliament of Malaysia. Singapore citizenship was inseparable from Malaysian citizenship; it was not possible to have Singaporean citizenship without having Malaysian citizenship.

Upon Singapore's secession from Malaysia on 9 August 1965, Malaysian citizenship was withdrawn from Singaporean citizens.

The Constitution was amended in 2004 to allow female citizens and citizens by descent to transmit their citizenship to children born overseas. For this to occur, citizens by descent must satisfy certain residency requirements.

== Acquisition and loss of citizenship ==
=== Entitlement by birth or descent ===
Individuals born in Singapore automatically receive Singaporean citizenship at birth if at least one parent is a Singapore citizen, except if the father is a foreign diplomat or enemy alien and birth occurred in occupied territory. Children born overseas are Singapore citizens by descent if either parent is a citizen otherwise than by descent. For an individual born abroad to a parent who is a citizen by descent, the parent must have lived in Singapore for two of the five years preceding the child's birth. Any child eligible for citizenship by descent must have their birth registered at a Singapore diplomatic mission within one year of their birth. Prior to 15 May 2004, citizenship was transferrable by descent only from fathers who were citizens by birth or registration, and not mothers.

=== Voluntary acquisition ===
Foreigners over the age of 21 may become Singapore citizens by naturalisation after residing in the country for at least 10 of the 12 years preceding an application for citizenship. Applicants must fulfill a basic language knowledge requirement (in English, Malay, Mandarin Chinese, or Tamil), intend to reside in Singapore permanently, renounce any previous nationalities, and swear an oath of allegiance to the state. Foreign women who marry Singaporean men are eligible for a reduced residence requirement of two years; there are no facilitated paths to citizenship for male spouses of citizens.

The government has discretionary power to waive requirements for further residence and grant citizenship to any person who has resided in the country for at least five of the previous six years. It may also exceptionally reduce residence requirements to 12 months, though this is targeted for foreign investors and skilled migrants who can make considerable economic contributions.

=== Relinquishment and deprivation ===
Singapore citizenship can be relinquished by making a declaration of renunciation, provided that the declarant is over age 21 and already possesses another nationality. Renunciation may be denied if an applicant actively exercises Singapore citizenship rights or has outstanding military service obligations. It is also automatically lost when an individual voluntarily acquires a foreign citizenship in any way. Singaporean children with multiple nationalities are required to choose between their Singaporean and foreign statuses before the age of 22. Dual nationals who fail to make this choice are automatically stripped of their Singapore citizenship. Former citizens cannot reacquire citizenship once it has been renounced or revoked.

Citizenship may be stripped from a person who exercises any rights derived from another nationality. This includes voting in elections or applying for passports in any jurisdiction outside Singapore. It is also lost after continuous residence overseas for more than 10 years if that citizen has not entered Singapore during that time or is not employed in public service.

Naturalised citizens may also be stripped of citizenship for: fraudulently acquiring it, committing an act of disloyalty against the state, aiding an enemy nation with which Singapore is at war, serving in any capacity for a foreign government, being sentenced to incarceration for longer than 12 months in any jurisdiction or fined US$5,000 for any offence within five years of acquiring citizenship.

== See also ==
- Visa policy of Singapore
- Visa requirements for Singaporean citizens
