= SmartGate =

Electronic border control system

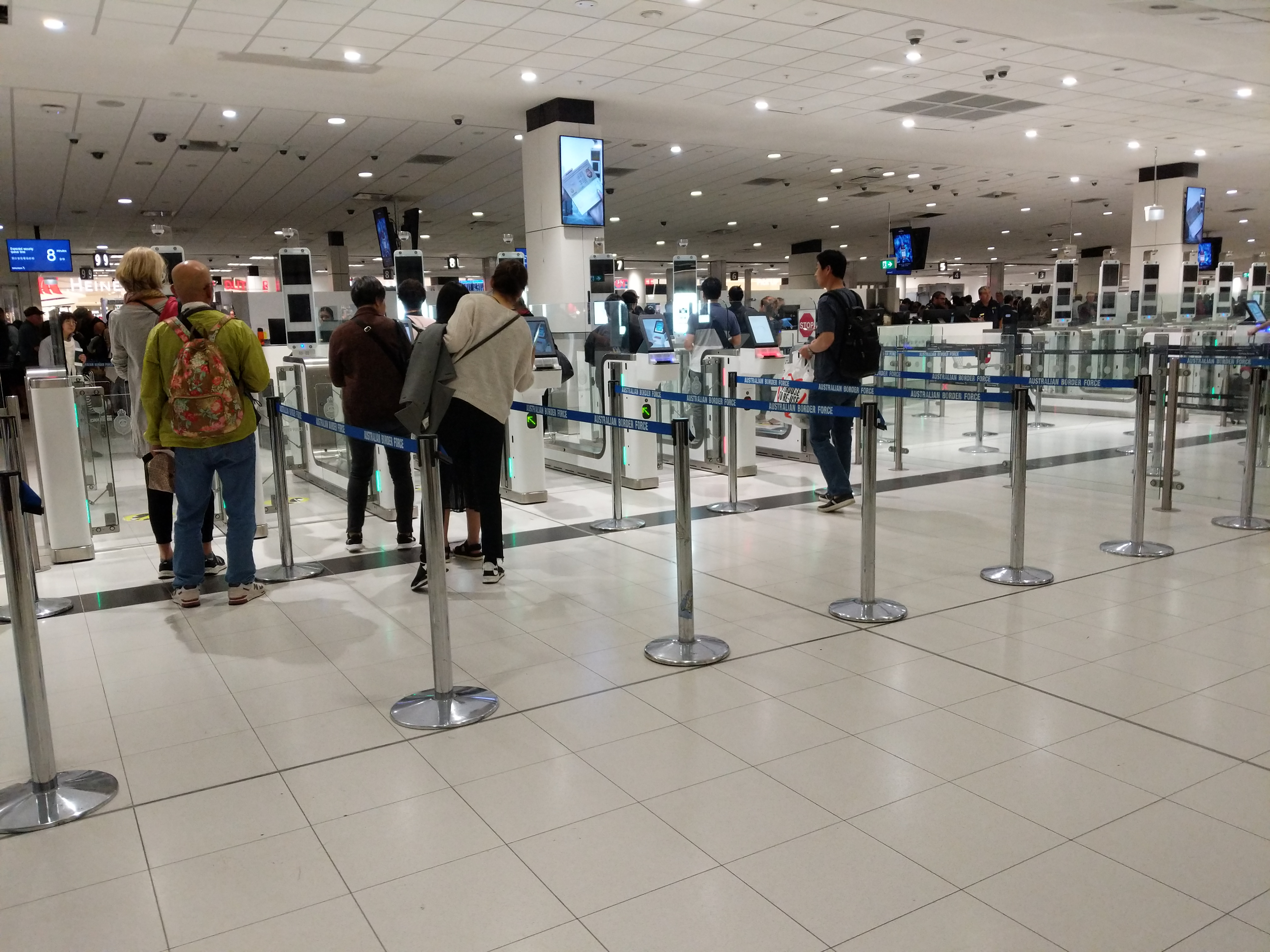
- SmartGate for departures at Sydney Airport, Australia
- Type of project: Electronic border control system
- Country: Australia, New Zealand
- Launched: 2007; 19 years ago Brisbane Airport
- Status: Active

SmartGate (eGate in New Zealand) is an automated self-service border control system operated by the Australian Border Force (ABF) and New Zealand Customs Service (NZCS) and located at immigration checkpoints in departure and arrival halls in ten Australian international airports, and 4 New Zealand international airports (as eGate). SmartGates allow Australian ePassport holders and ePassport holders of a number of other countries to clear immigration controls more rapidly, and to enhance travel security by performing passport control checks electronically.

SmartGate uses facial recognition technology to verify the traveller's identity against the data stored in the chip in their biometric passport, as well as checking against immigration databases. To use the SmartGate system, the traveller must have a biometric passport from Australia, New Zealand or certain other countries (these ePassports have the biometric logo on the front cover). The ePassport gate scanner reads all the information contained in the chip inside the passport and runs the data against numerous databases to determine if the traveller is a security risk, while a camera takes a picture of the traveller and an officer at a control station behind the gates checks that the image captured by the camera matches the one on the passport (facial recognition). Once the data verification and facial recognition process is complete, doors will automatically either open, signifying that the traveller is permitted to enter and/or exit the country, or remain closed and a stop icon illuminate, demonstrating that the traveller has failed the security checks and will personally meet with immigration officials.

Travellers require a biometric passport to use SmartGate as it uses information from the passport (such as photograph, name and date of birth) and in the respective countries' databases (i.e. banned travellers database) to decide whether to grant entry or departure from the country or to generate a referral to a customs agent. These checks would otherwise require manual processing by a human, which is time-consuming, costly and potentially error-prone.

== History ==
The first trials of SmartGate began in 2002 with Qantas aircrews. The trials were expanded in 2004 to include over 1,000 Qantas platinum frequent flyers, and in 2007 it was launched to the public at Brisbane Airport.

Since October 2005, Australia has issued only biometric passports, called ePassports. As the validity of Australian passports do not exceed 10 years, all previous Australian passports have now expired and all valid passports are now biometric.

In May 2015, the Australian Government announced that SmartGate will be launched at air and sea ports, using solely biometrics to identify and process arriving passengers, with a goal of processing 90% of air travellers automatically by 2020. The introduction of biometric arrivals, under the Seamless Traveller initiative, is expected to cost approximately AU$93.7m over 5 years and be completed by March 2019.

== Eligibility ==
=== Australia (SmartGates) ===
SmartGates are operated by the Australian Border Force and are available at various airports upon arrival and departure. The system requires travellers to look as much as their passport photo as possible, which may require removing accessories such as glasses, hats, or masks when using the SmartGate.

==== Requirements ====
Departing travellers, regardless of age and nationality, can use the SmartGates if they have an ePassport or machine-readable passport and can independently use the machine.

As of June 2025, previous eligibility criteria for arriving travellers based on nationality have been removed. All travellers holding an ePassport or machine-readable passport are now eligible to use arrival SmartGates.

Children aged 7 and over may also use arrival SmartGates and kiosks when entering Australia, provided they are accompanied by a parent or legal guardian, possess an ePassport, and are taller than 110 cm.

==== Exceptions ====
There are a number of notable exceptions when entering and departing Australia and using SmartGate.

- If airline crew meet the above requirements they are also eligible to use SmartGate or they may continue to use the "crew lane".
- Australian and New Zealand citizens travelling on military orders may not use SmartGate upon arrival.

==== Locations ====
In Australia, SmartGates are available at ten international airports:

- Adelaide
- Avalon (departure only)
- Brisbane
- Cairns
- Canberra
- Darwin
- Gold Coast
- Melbourne
- Perth
- Sydney

=== New Zealand (eGates) ===
eGate uses biometrics to match the picture of your face in your ePassport with the picture it takes of you at the gate. To make sure eGate is able to do this, passengers must look as similar to their ePassport photo as possible. Passengers should avoid headwear (including veils, scarfs, and hats) that obscure the face.

==== Requirements ====
Arriving and departing travellers, can use eGate if they have a machine-readable passport, are aged ten or over, can independently use the machine and have a passport of one of the eligible nationalities. Moreover, a New Zealand Traveller Declaration (NZTD) before reaching passport control.

The following passport nationalities are eligible for New Zealand's eGate system (as of 13 October 2025).

- New Zealand
- Andorra
- Australia
- Austria
- Bahrain
- Belgium
- Brazil
- Bulgaria
- Canada
- Chile
- China
- Croatia
- Cyprus
- Czech Republic
- Denmark
- Estonia
- Finland
- France
- Germany
- Greece
- Hong Kong
- Hungary
- Iceland
- Italy
- (Republic of Ireland) Ireland
- Japan
- Kuwait
- Latvia
- Liechtenstein
- Lithuania
- Luxembourg
- Macau
- Malaysia
- Malta
- Mexico
- Monaco
- Netherlands
- Norway
- Oman
- Philippines
- Poland
- Portugal
- Romania
- San Marino
- Seychelles
- Singapore
- Slovakia
- Slovenia
- South Korea
- Spain
- Sweden
- Switzerland
- Taiwan
- Thailand
- United Arab Emirates
- United Kingdom
- United States
- Vatican City

==== Locations ====
In New Zealand, eGates are available at four international airports:

- Auckland
- Wellington
- Christchurch
- Queenstown

== Privacy issues ==
The SmartGate system collects personal information includes the information on the biometric page of the passport, such as name, gender, date of birth, passport number, passport photograph, nationality, and the country of origin of the passport.

Other information may also be collected, such as travel details, and the facial biometric template.

Travellers passports are not stamped if they are processed by SmartGate. If evidence of travel is required after using a SmartGate, the secondary staffed counters must be approached by the traveller and a stamping request made.

== See also ==
- ePassport gates - a similar system operated in the United Kingdom
- PARAFE - a similar system operated in France
