= Visa policy of Seychelles =

Policy on permits required to enter Seychelles

All visitors to Seychelles are required to obtain an Electronic Travel Authorisation before departure.

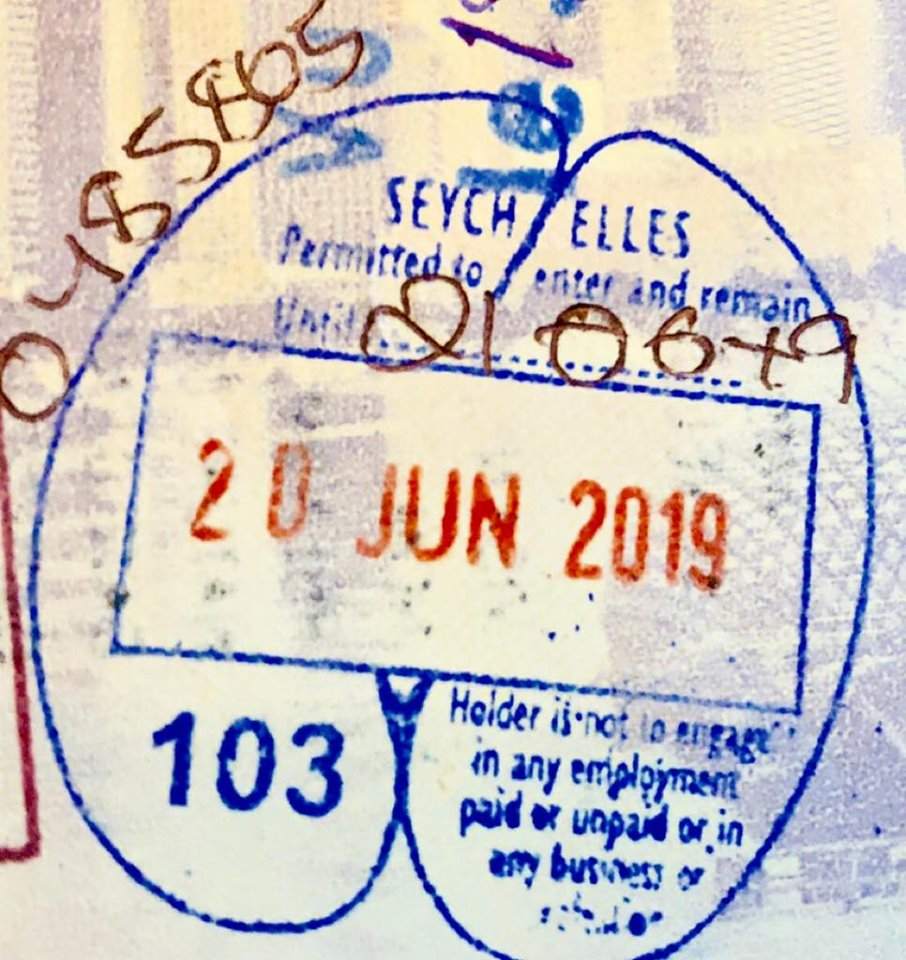
Seychelles Entry Stamp

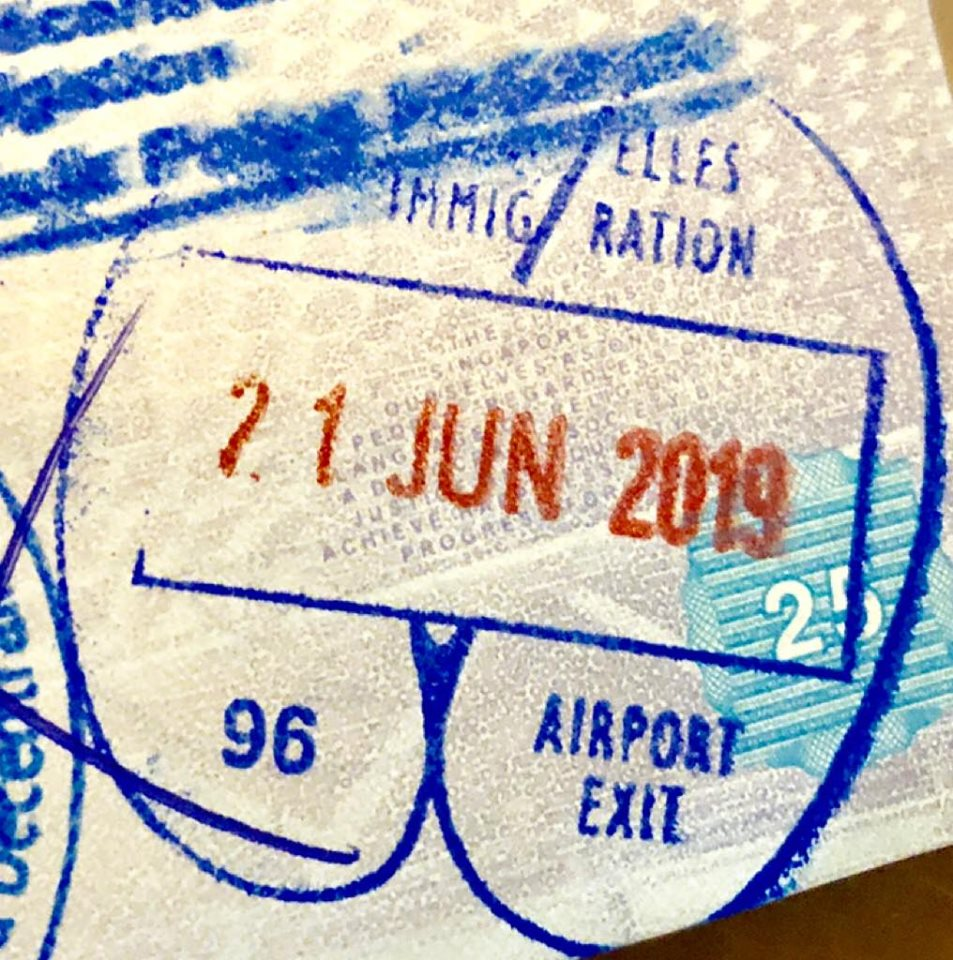
Seychelles Exit Stamp

Upon arrival, a Visitor Permit is issued free of charge and is initially valid for up to 3 months but it may be extended for a fee for a period of up to three months with further extensions not exceeding total period of twelve months. They must be in a possession of a valid passport, return or onward ticket, proof of accommodation and sufficient funds.

== Visa policy map ==
Visa policy of Seychelles Seychelles Electronic Travel Authorisation - ETA (90 days)

== Electronic Travel Authorisation ==
Citizens of all countries must obtain a free Visitor’s Permit on arrival after obtaining an Electronic Travel Authorization (ETA) through the Seychelles Electronic Border System prior to departure. The permitted stay for all nationals is 90 days.

The Seychelles Electronic Travel Authorisation (ETA) has different fees depending on processing speed. Standard processing within 24 hours costs €10, while premium processing within 6 hours costs €30. An expedited option is also available for €70, with approval in approximately 60 minutes.

=== Non-ordinary passports ===
In addition to countries whose citizens are visa-exempt, holders of diplomatic, official and service passports issued by Ethiopia are not required to obtain a Visitor’s Permit for up to 90 days.

== Seychelles Electronic Border System (SEBS) ==
All of Seychelles' border formalities have been digitised and must be completed by travellers of all countries before entering Seychelles, via the SEBS.
Below are some requirements from SEBS:

- This can be submitted up to 30 days before travel.
- Visitors must upload a reservation confirmation(s) for each visitor's location of stay in Seychelles.
- A yellow fever vaccination certificate is required if coming from endemic countries.
- Payment of the fee (10 EUR) by credit or debit card.
- Valid for one journey only and It expires once exit the country.

== Visitors statistics ==
Most visitors in the Seychelles were from the following countries of nationality:

Country	2016	2015
France	43,066	43,370
Germany	39,488	35,895
United Arab Emirates	24,091	21,178
Italy	22,845	21,704
United Kingdom	18,885	16,572
China	14,549	13,941
South Africa	12,354	13,375
Switzerland	12,333	11,499
Russia	11,465	12,222
India	10,916	7,718
Total	303,177	276,233

== See also ==
- Visa requirements for Seychellois citizens
- Tourism in Seychelles
