= EPassport gates =

Type of automated self-service barrier

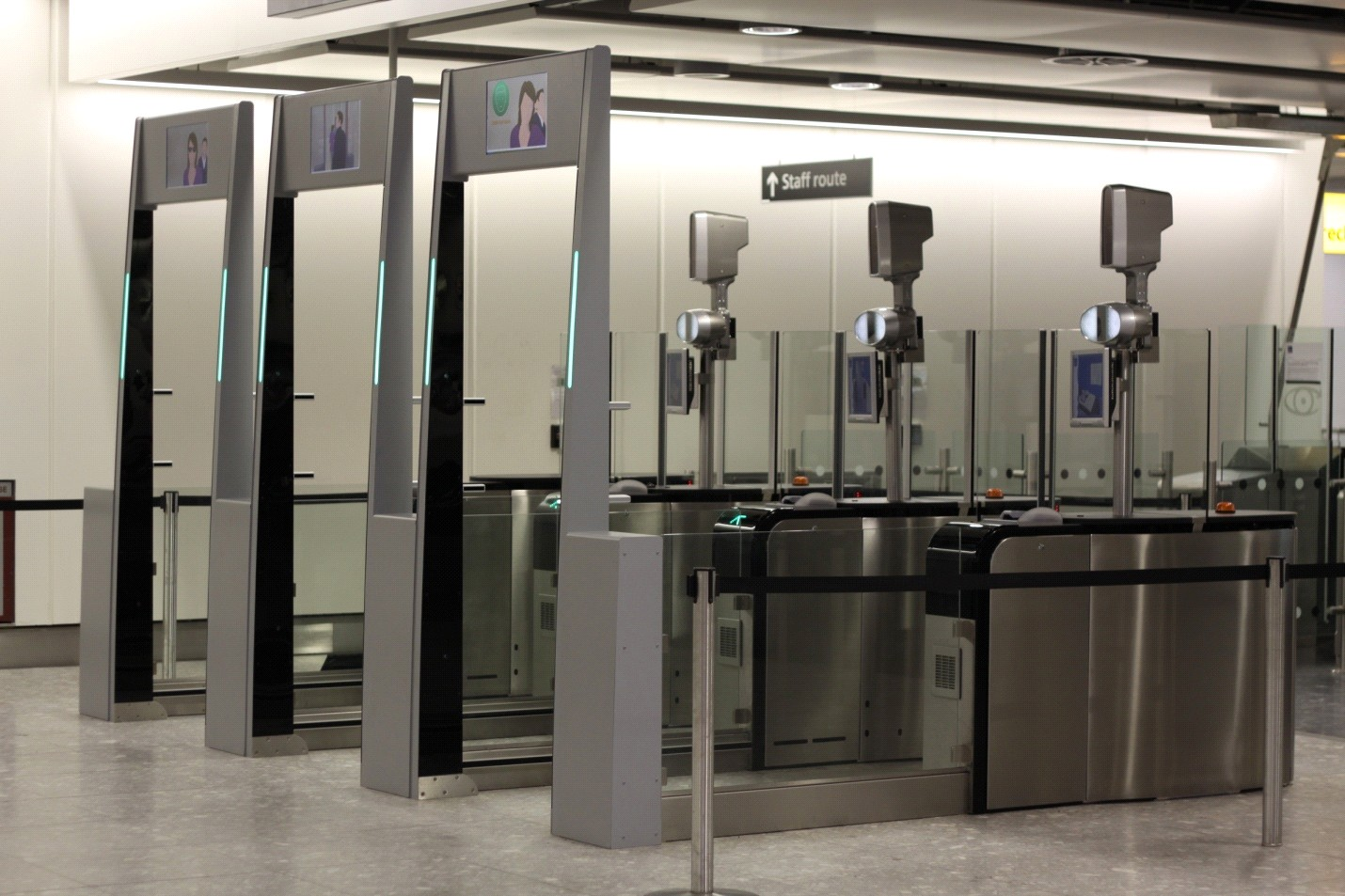
ePassport gates in Heathrow Airport (Terminal 4)

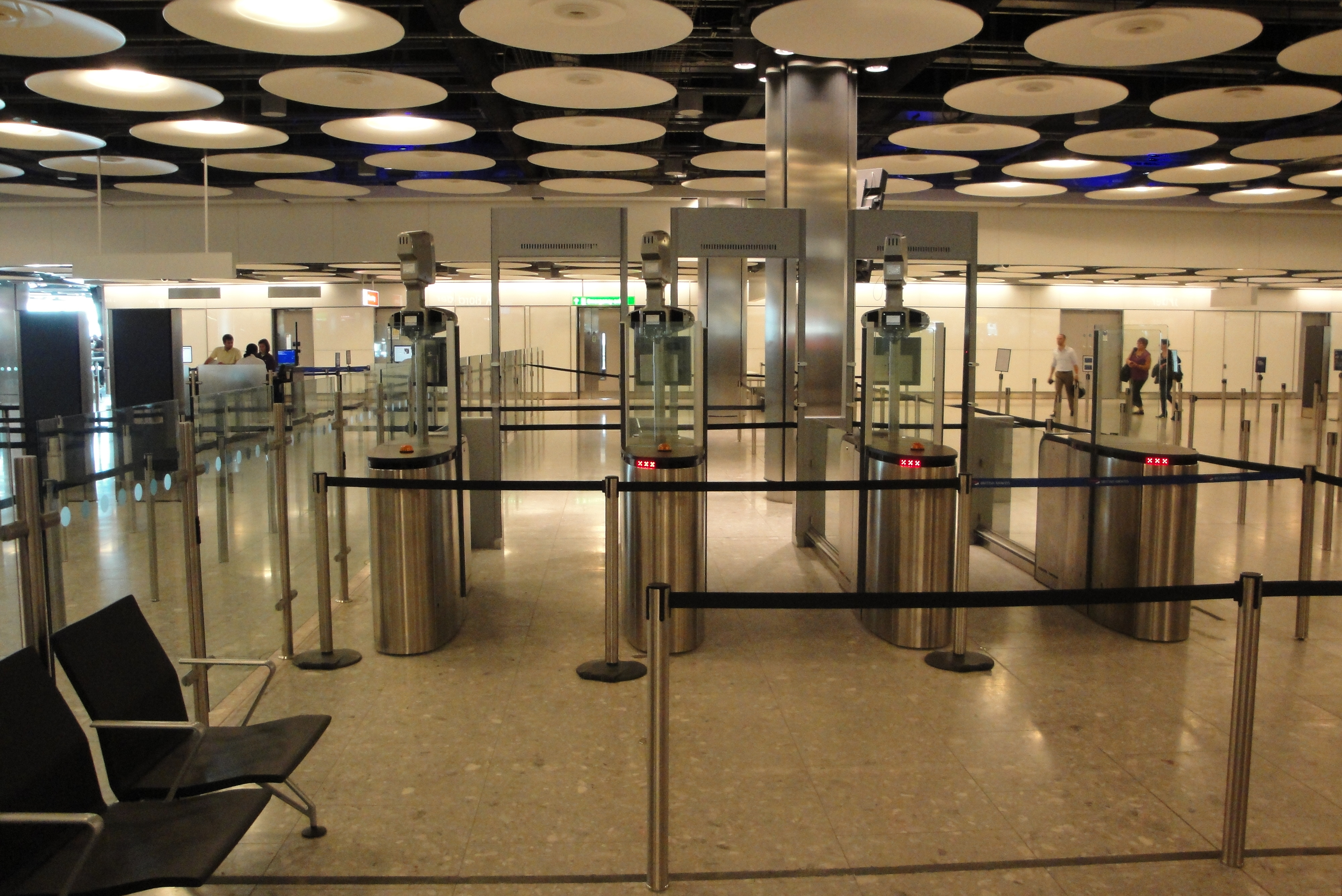
ePassport gates in Heathrow Airport (Terminal 5)

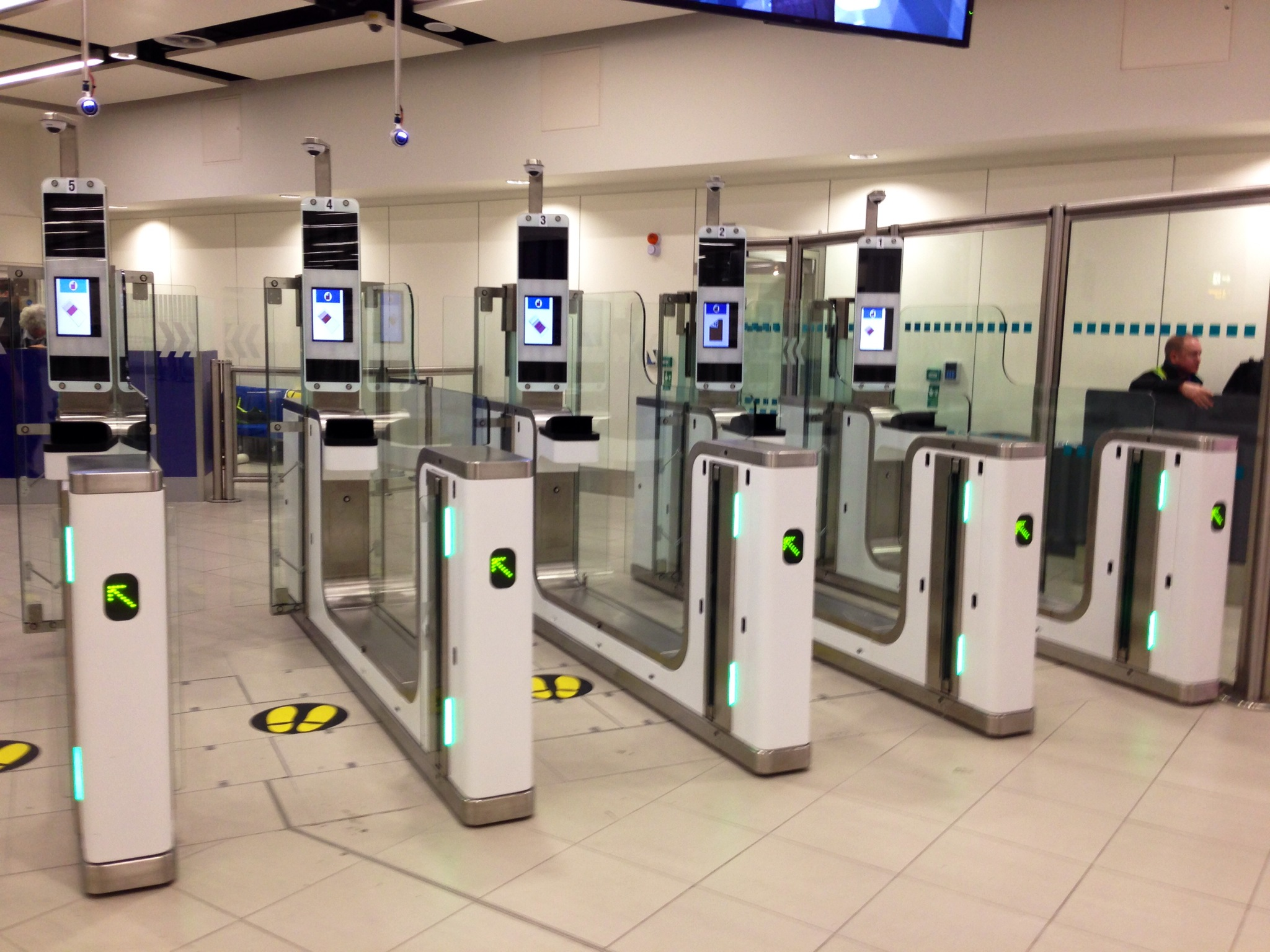
ePassport gates in Gatwick Airport (South Terminal)

ePassport gates are automated self-service barriers (an automated border control system) operated by the UK Border Force and located at immigration checkpoints in arrival halls in some airports across the UK and at the juxtaposed controls in international railway terminals abroad, offering an alternative to using desks staffed by immigration officers. The gates use facial recognition technology to verify the traveller's identity against the data stored in the chip in their biometric passport, as well as run the data against numerous databases to determine if the traveller is a security risk.

== Eligibility ==
Citizens of the following countries aged 8 or over are eligible to use the ePassport gates:

- United Kingdom
- (Europe) all European Union member states
- Australia
- Canada
- Iceland
- Japan
- Liechtenstein
- New Zealand
- Norway
- Singapore
- South Korea
- Switzerland
- United States of America

Travelers aged under 18 must be accompanied by an adult. ePassport gates are usually marked with this symbol. The ePassport gates do not, however, accept national identity cards. If the holder's nationality is shown as a British overseas territories citizen; a British overseas citizen; a British subject; a British national (overseas); or a British protected person then the holder will not be able to use the ePassport gates.

ePassport gates were first introduced in 2008 and were available to EEA and Swiss citizens aged 12 and over. They were expanded to include some third country nationals (citizens of Australia, Canada, Japan, New Zealand, Singapore, South Korea, and the United States of America) in 2019. Upon the British withdrawal from the European Union EEA and Swiss citizens continued to be eligible, although those not benefiting from the EU settlement scheme or some other visa now enter as visitors, with the exception of Irish citizens. The minimum age was lowered to 10 in 2023, and again to 8 and above starting 8 July 2026 provided that they are at least 1.20 m tall.

Upon successfully using the ePassport gates, citizens of the above countries entering as a visitor are granted 6 months' leave to enter (subject to conditions prohibiting employment and recourse to public funds) and do not receive a passport stamp or any written notice/endorsement. However, citizens of the above countries who wish to enter the UK with a Tier 5 (Temporary Worker - Creative and Sporting) Certificate of Sponsorship (for up to 3 months) or on a permitted paid engagement are not eligible to use the ePassport gates, as a passport stamp must be obtained in these situations.

In addition, citizens from the following countries/territories who are enrolled in the Registered Traveller Service can also use ePassport gates, provided that they hold valid biometric passports and are aged either 18 and over or 12 and over travelling with an adult:

- Andorra
- Argentina
- (The Bahamas) Bahamas
- Belize
- Botswana
- Brazil
- Brunei Darussalam
- Chile
- Costa Rica
- Guatemala
- Vatican City State
- Hong Kong (SAR passports only)
- Israel (temporarily unavailable)
- Macau
- Malaysia
- Maldives
- Mexico
- Monaco
- Nauru
- Nicaragua
- Panama
- Papua New Guinea
- Paraguay
- Saint Vincent and the Grenadines
- Samoa
- Seychelles
- Taiwan (Note: Only for holders with their personal ID numbers stipulated in their respective passports. Taiwan issues passports without ID numbers to some persons not having the right to reside in Taiwan, including nationals without household registration. ePassport gates access granted by the United Kingdom to Taiwan passport holders has not altered its non-recognition of Taiwan as a sovereign country.)
- Tonga
- Trinidad and Tobago
- Uruguay

Upon successfully using the ePassport gates, citizens of the above countries who are enrolled in the 'Registered Traveller Service' and entering as a visitor are granted 6 months' leave to enter (subject to conditions prohibiting employment and recourse to public funds) without receiving a passport stamp or any written notice/endorsement.

Practical difficulties may be faced by non-British/Irish citizens who have used an ePassport gate to enter the UK as they do not receive a passport stamp evidencing leave to enter. For example, landlords are legally required to check the immigration status of tenants before the start of a tenancy agreement. The Home Office advises that where a prospective tenant is a non-visa national who used an ePassport gate to enter the UK, the landlord should accept any documentary evidence (such as a ticket or boarding pass) that establishes the date of arrival in the UK within the past 6 months.

== Use ==
To use the ePassport gates, the traveller must have a biometric passport from the United Kingdom and certain other countries (these ePassports have the biometric logo on the front cover). The ePassport gate scanner reads all the information contained in the chip inside the passport, while a camera takes a picture of the traveller which is then compared against their passport photo using a facial recognition algorithm. Once the data verification and facial recognition process is complete, doors will automatically either open, signifying that the traveller is permitted to enter the country, or remain closed and a stop icon illuminate, demonstrating that the traveller has failed the security checks and will personally meet with immigration officials.

== Availability ==
At present, ePassport gates are available at the following locations:

- Birmingham Airport
- Bristol Airport
- Cardiff Airport
- East Midlands Airport
- Edinburgh Airport
- Eurostar Brussels-South Terminal (juxtaposed controls)
- Eurostar Paris Nord Terminal (juxtaposed controls)
- Gatwick Airport (both terminals)
- Glasgow Airport
- Heathrow Airport (all terminals)
- London City Airport
- Luton Airport
- Manchester Airport (all terminals)
- Newcastle Airport
- Stansted Airport

== Suspension ==
At some airports, the UK Border Force temporarily suspends the operation of ePassport gates when certain flights that are deemed to be 'high risk' arrive. For example, at Glasgow Airport, the UK Border Force has on occasions disabled the operation of ePassport gates when flights arrive from Romania, as it regards those flights to be 'high risk' from a safeguarding perspective. By requiring all arriving passengers to use a staffed immigration counter, UK Border Force officers are better able to identify potential victims of trafficking and modern slavery.

Due to the COVID-19 pandemic, ePassport gates were for a time suspended for all nationalities, including for all British nationals.

== See also ==
- Iris Recognition Immigration System – another type of automated self-service barriers formerly used by the Border Force at Heathrow Airport (Terminals 3 and 5)
- SmartGate – a similar system operated in Australia and New Zealand
- Parafe – a similar system operated in France
- Automated Passport Control – a similar system operated in the United States
- Global Entry – a similar, membership-only system operated in the United States
- Automated Border Control systems
