= Seychellois passport =

Passport issued to citizens of Seychelles

Seychellois passport Passeport Seychellois
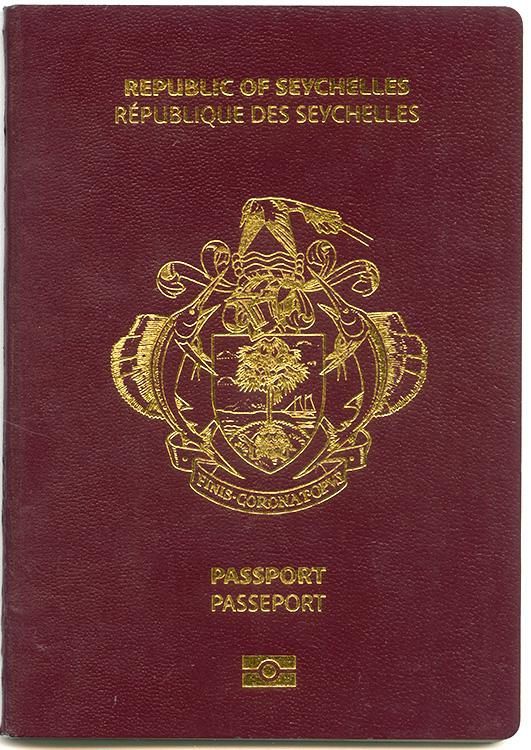
- The front cover of a Seychellois biometric passport

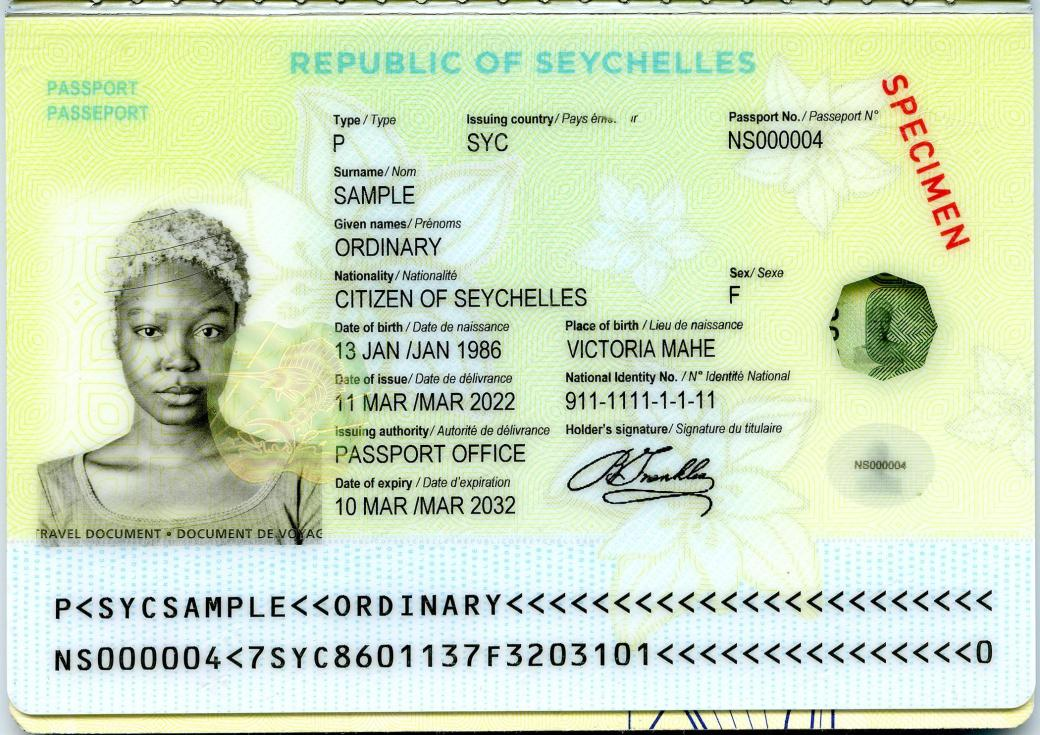
- The polycarbonate photo page of a contemporary Seychellois Passport
- Type: Passport
- Issued by: Seychelles
- First issued: November 2022 (Biometric Passport)
- Purpose: Identification
- Eligibility: Seychellois citizenship
- Cost: Passport Fees: SR 750; Surcharge for loss/stolen or missing passports: SR 1500

Seychelles passports are issued to citizens of Seychelles to travel outside the country.

On the front cover of the passport is the coat of arms of Seychelles. The passport has two languages, French and English.

As of 11 April 2024, Seychellois citizens had visa-free or visa on arrival access to 156 countries and territories, ranking the Seychellois passport 26th in terms of travel freedom, and best ranking African country, according to the Henley Passport Index.

== History ==
The first legislation of passports in Seychelles appeared in 1920 during the administration of Governor Sir Eustace Edward Twistleton-Wykeham Fiennes (1864–1943). Published in the Seychelles Government Gazette no. 50 on 6 November 1920, it was a Bill of An Ordinance to regulate the issue of passports in the colony and to require persons landing in the colony to be possessed of passports, and otherwise to restrict the landing in the colony of undesirable immigrants.

The ordinance must have fallen short of its intended purpose because, by the end of 1921, it was repealed and replaced by Passport Ordinance 1921.

In 1932, the price of a passport was R10.00. The fee remained unchanged until January 1, 1968, when it increased to R30.00. By then, the number of Seychellois travellers had practically tripled. During recent colonial times (as from the early 1950s) the passport that was issued to Seychellois nationals who were then Commonwealth citizens bore the words 'British Passport' above the royal coat of arms of Queen Elizabeth II and the words 'Colony of Seychelles' written below.

On 29 June 1976, when Seychelles became independent, upon acquiring their nationhood, Seychellois automatically lost the status of British subject and became citizens of Seychelles. However, a person of Seychellois descent could retain his British nationality if his father or paternal grandfather was born in the United Kingdom or in a colony that was not yet independent.

The modern history of the passport began with the adoption of a new constitution in 1979. It was on 5 June 1979 that the Department of Internal Affairs presented the Seychellois public with their new passport. Measuring 9 cm by 12 cm, containing 32 pages, the passport contained features which the Independence passport lacked. For example, a special issue device was included to protect the holder's photograph and to avoid fraudulent changes in signature and important dates. It consisted of a transparent plastic sheet which was applied over the whole of the page containing the photograph.

In 1997, twenty-seven years after it came into operation, passports went through yet another series of changes 'to meet world standards'. This came at the recommendation of the International Civil Aviation Organization (ICAO) that all member countries adopt the same machine-readable format. Three types of passports came into operation: dark brown for ordinary citizens, red for diplomats and ministers and green for senior officials and members of the National Assembly. The sizes of passport photos were reduced from 51 mm by 64 mm to 35 mm by 45 mm.

== See also ==
- List of passports
- Visa requirements for Seychellois citizens
