= Ports of entry of China =

Legal entryways to China

In China, ports of entry (POE) (Chinese: 口岸; pinyin: kǒu'àn; lit. 'shore mouths') are the lawful points of entry and exit from the country for freight and passengers. These include seaports, inland ports, airports, railway stations, and border crossings. POEs are created by the State Council or by provincial governments. They are legally distinct from transportation facilities; for example, the Tianjin Water Transport Port of Entry (Chinese: 天津水运口岸) is distinct from Tianjin Port (Chinese: 天津港).

POE facilities perform customs and border control functions. They are generally located at transport terminals.

== Classes of ports ==
According to the "Regulations of the State Council on Port of Entry Openings", ports of entry are categorized as either Class I or Class II. The "China Port of Entry Yearbook" uses these categories when identifying inbound and outbound inspection stations for freight, personnel, and vehicles.

=== Class I ===
Class I, or national-level, entry ports are established by national authorities. The State Council authorizes them after consultations with the province where the port is located and the People's Liberation Army (PLA). There are three types of Class I ports:

1. Sea, land, air, and passenger/cargo ports of entry that are open to foreign vessels, aircraft, vehicles, and other means of transportation. Most Class I ports belong to this category.
2. Sea, land, air, passenger, and cargo ports of entry that only allow Chinese-flagged ships, aircraft, and vehicles to enter or leave the country (e.g. Luoyang Air Transportation Port of Entry in Henan Province and Zhongshan Water Transportation Port in Guangdong Province, which only allow Chinese aircraft and ships to enter or leave the country). As of 2016, there were no Class I land Ports of Entry with that limitation.
3. Sea delivery points in China's territorial waters where foreign vessels are allowed to enter and exit (e.g., the Bozhong [Bohai Oil] Water Transport Port of Entry in Tianjin, which is the offshore oil delivery point for CNOOC Bohai Corporation).

The "13th Five-Year Plan for the Development of National Ports of Entry" specifies that certain passenger and cargo volume indicators three years after the opening of a Port of Entry will be used to determine the suitability of its status, and this status may be withdrawn.

PoE annual passenger and cargo targets
	Units	Sea	Inland River	Border River	Railway	Road	Coastal Airports	Other Airports
Cargo	1000 t	1000	200	50	100	50	30	30
Passengers	1000	-	-	10	100	50	100	50

=== Class II ===
Class II, or "local-level", entry ports are created by local governments with the consent of the PLA and the provincial government after consulting local border inspection and examination units. Construction is financed locally. There are three types of Class II ports:

1. Loading and unloading points, points of departure, and transshipment points for foreign trade transportation by national vessels that rely on other ports of entry for border inspection and examination procedures.
2. Ports for small-scale border trade and people-to-people exchanges agreed with the local governments of neighboring countries.
3. Entry-exit points that are restricted to border residents only.

In the period of reform and opening, the various provincial governments of China approved the establishment of 331 Type II ports. On August 28, 1998: 46, the State Council issued the "Circular on Cleaning up and Rectifying Class II Ports" (State Circular [1998] No. 74), which intended to clean-up and rectify this proliferation of Type II Ports of Entry. The circular suspended the approval of class II ports, and proceeded to review the existing ones for their suitability as Ports of Entry. A total of 177 class II ports were closed, 57 class II ports were upgraded to class I ports, and 97 class II ports were merged with neighboring class I ports. This consolidation process is still ongoing.

== Government bodies ==
The basic structure of a port of entry includes 1) an integrated management system, 2) a supervision and inspection system, 3) an external transportation and external trade system; and 4) a service system. Generally, the number of units and departments working at a port of entry can reach about 40.

First, because of the different bureaucratic affiliations of the units at the port, it is necessary to have an integrated management organization to coordinate the relationship between the systems, which is usually a "port of entry management committee" (口岸管理委员会) or a "port of entry office" (口岸办公室) set up by the local government.

Second, the supervision and inspection system entails the management, supervision, and inspection of people, baggage, cargo, and means of transportation entering and leaving the country, and includes three subsystems: inspection (检查), testing (检验), and quarantine (检疫). As of 2024, the relevant agencies include

1. The National Immigration Administration for migration inspection.
2. The General Administration of Customs is responsible for customs, excise, and duties; for contraband and prohibited goods interdiction; and for health, animal, and plant quarantine. (Note: during the COVID-19 pandemic, the National Health Commission and the Chinese Center for Disease Control and Prevention took over organizing and running the new stringent border controls and 21-days quarantines, once the full-country lock-down was eased down.)
3. The China Maritime Safety Administration is responsible for ship inspection and ship health certification.
4. The China Civil Aviation Authority is responsible for airplane inspection.
5. The State Administration for Market Regulation for commodity inspection, quality testing, and food testing.
6. The Ministry of Agriculture for the fishing vessels registry (中华人民共和国渔业船舶检验局), and many other state organizations each with their own remits.

Third, the external transportation system includes the actual transport institutions such as the management companies of the seaports, airports, railway stations, and other terminals and hubs; the shipping companies, airlines, transportation companies, logistics companies, and other enterprises involved in the transport of goods and people.

Finally, the service system includes banking, insurance, shipping agencies, supply, warehousing, seafarers' clubs, etc.。

The China Association of Ports-of-Entry (中国口岸协会 CAOP) is a national comprehensive association with independent legal personality, approved by the Ministry of Civil Affairs and supervised by the General Administration of Customs (GAC). The leading members of the association are composed of relevant personnel from the GAC, Ministry of Public Security, Ministry of Transport, China Railway, Civil Aviation Administration of China, plus other central departments and important local port of entry authorities. It serves as an organization for the exchange of port of entry information, business training, international cooperation, and the provision of consulting services, and also edits the China Port of Entry Yearbook.

== History ==
The Ming and Qing dynasties, guided by the idea of "naval defense over commerce", had a long history of closed-door policies, closing ports, removing population from coastal areas, and forcing foreign traders into specific, limited ports (the Canton factories). This changed abruptly after the Opium War in 1840, when China was forced to open five ports of entry to foreign commerce: (Guangzhou, Xiamen, Fuzhou, Ningbo, and Shanghai). As Western powers forced the opening of China in a succession of wars and unequal treaties, the number of treaty ports opened to the outside world increased to 35 by 1895. The idea of "commercial war", counterattacking the West commercial dominance, was put forward by thinkers such as Zheng Guanying in the 1870s, and began to be practiced in 1898, with the emergence of "self-opened commercial ports" The earliest self-opened commercial port in China was the port of Sandu'ao in Ningde, Fujian, followed by Qinhuangdao and Yuezhou. By the end of the Qing dynasty, there were 36 self-opened merchant ports spread throughout China, increasing to 52 in 1924, a number almost equal to the number of treaty ports:

The vagaries and hardships of the twentieth century meant that the number of open ports in China varied wildly as circumstances and governments changed. By 1978, there were only 51 ports of entry open to the outside world, including 18 water ports (17 on the coast and one on an inland waterway), eight air ports (seven international airports and one special airport), nine railroad ports, and 16 highway ports. Due to political reasons, most land ports were opened with socialist countries, and foreign trade was mainly in the form of barter and aid. In 1978, the volume of foreign trade goods entering and leaving the country through the Class I ports was 70.33 million tons, and the total value of import and export trade through the various types of ports was 20.64 billion US dollars, with 5,658,000 passengers entering and exiting the country, and a total of 325,000 ships, planes, trains, and cars.

After the start of the reform and opening, and especially after Deng Xiaoping's southern tour, the Chinese government started opening a new wave of ports; between 1978 and 1993, 150 new national ports were opened, 50 new ports were opened in 1992 and 1993 alone. By 1993, there were 201 Class I ports in China, including 117 water transport ports (65 coastal and 52 inland waterway ports), 46 air transport ports, 12 railroad ports and 35 highway ports, and all the province-level entities in China, except for landlocked Qinghai and Ningxia, had open ports. In 1993, the volume of foreign trade cargo in and out of the Class I ports amounted to 305 million tons, and the total amount of import and export trade through all kinds of ports was 195.72 billion U.S. dollars, 95.68 million passengers entering and leaving the country, and 8.989 million ships, planes, trains, and cars.

In 2006, the State Council approved the opening of Xining Caojiapu Airport in Qinghai province to international flights, which opened a port of entry into the last of the 31 provincial-level entities in China. The whole of China was now for the first time literally open to the world. By 2016, China had a total of 305 national-level ports of entry officially open to the public, including 137 water transport ports (82 coastal and 55 in inland waterways), 73 air transport ports, 20 railroad ports, and 75 highway ports. In 2016, (Note: These statistics refer to the officially opened ports of entry, and excludes the cargo and passengers that entered to temporarily opened ports) the total value of imported and exported cargo at ports nationwide was US$3,685,557 million. The COVID-19 pandemic closed or restricted most of those ports, but on 8 January 2023, all mainland China ports that had been closed due to the pandemic were opened again.

== List of national-level ports of entry ==
=== Highways ===
As of 2016, the People's Republic of China had a total of 75 Class I highway PoEs, including 9 international ports of entry open to Hong Kong and Macao, and 64 international or bilateral ports (Note: Bilateral ports mean those ports of entry that are limited exclusively to the citizens of the two bordering countries, and cannot process third-country nationals) to land-adjacent countries, in addition to 1 temporarily open PoE.

In 2016 statistics, the road port with the highest volume of import and export freight was Xinjiang's Khorgos Port of Entry, with an annual cargo volume of 25,575,568 tons, followed by Inner Mongolia's Ganq Mod Port of Entry with a cargo volume of 15,535,196 tons, and Guangdong's Huanggang Port, with a volume of 13,522,881 tons. The port with the largest number of passenger arrivals and departures was Gongbei Port in Guangdong, with 123,576,659 arrivals and departures per year, followed by Luohu Crossing in Guangdong with 81,231,123 arrivals and departures, and Shenzhen Bay Port also in Guangdong with 42,831,754 arrivals and departures; the port with the largest number of departures and arrivals among the ports not connected with Hong Kong and Macao was Ruili Port in Yunnan with 15,756,480 arrivals and departures, which was the fifth largest land port of entry overall in terms of number of arrivals and departures. The port with the largest number of inbound and outbound vehicles was Huanggang Port, with 8,452,162 vehicles, followed by Shenzhen Bay Port with 4,388,461 vehicles and Ruili Port with 3,975,104 vehicles.

Province	Name	Opening year	Connects to	Notes
Inner Mongolia	Manzhouli	1989	Zabaykalsk, Russia	
Inner Mongolia	Heishantou	1989	Tsurukaitu, Russia	
Inner Mongolia	Shiwei	1989	Olochi, Russia	Bilateral traffic only
Inner Mongolia	Ar Haxat	1992	Choibalsan, Mongolia	Bilateral traffic only
Inner Mongolia	Ebuduge	2009	Bayankhoshuu, Mongolia	Bilateral traffic only
Inner Mongolia	Arxan	2012	Khalkh River, Mongolia	
Inner Mongolia	Erenhot	1990	Zamyn-Üüd, Mongolia	
Inner Mongolia	Ganq Mod	1992	Gashuun Sukhait, Mongolia	Bilateral traffic only
Inner Mongolia	Ceke	2005	Shivee Khuren, Mongolia	Bilateral traffic only
Inner Mongolia	Zhu'engadabuqi	1992	Bichigt Zuun, Mongolia	
Inner Mongolia	Mandula	2009	Khangi, Mongolia	Bilateral traffic only
Inner Mongolia	Uliji	2016	Tsagaandel Uul, Mongolia	Bilateral traffic only
Liaoning	Dandong	1955	Sinuiju, North Korea	
Jilin	Tumen	1941	Namyang, North Korea	
Jilin	Nanping	1951	Musan, North Korea	Bilateral traffic only
Jilin	Hunchun	1988	Kraskino, Russia	
Jilin	Quanhe	1998	Rason, North Korea	
Jilin	Changbai	1950	Hyesan, North Korea	
Jilin	Linjiang	1950	Junggang, North Korea	Bilateral traffic only
Jilin	Sanhe	1941	Hoeryong, North Korea	Bilateral traffic only
Jilin	Kaishantun	1933	Onsong, North Korea	Bilateral traffic only
Jilin	Guchengli	1953	Taehongdan, North Korea	
Jilin	Shatuozi	1985	Kyongwon, North Korea	Bilateral traffic only
Jilin	Ji'an	2014	Manpo, North Korea	
Jilin	Shuangmufeng	2019	Samjiyon, North Korea	Bilateral traffic only
Heilongjiang	Dongning	1989	Poltavka, Russia	
Heilongjiang	Suifenhe	2000	Pogranichny, Russia	
Heilongjiang	Mishan	1989	Turii Rog, Russia	
Heilongjiang	Hulin	1989	Markovo, Russia	
Guangdong	Luohu Port	1887	Lo Wu Control Point, Hong Kong	
Guangdong	Huanggang Port	1988	Huanggang Control Point, Hong Kong	
Guangdong	Wenjindu Port	1979	Man Kam To Control Point, Hong Kong	
Guangdong	Shatoujiao	1984	Sha Tau Kok Control Point, Hong Kong	
Guangdong	Shenzhen Bay Port	2006	Shenzhen Bay Control Point, Hong Kong	
Guangdong	Futian Port	2007	Lok Ma Chau Spur Line Control Point, Hong Kong	
Guangdong	Liantang Checkpoint	2019	Heung Yuen Wai Control Point, Hong Kong	
Guangdong	Gongbei Port	1887	Portas do Cerco, Macau	
Guangdong	Hengqin Port	1999	Posto Fronteiriço Hengqin, Macau	
Guangdong	Zhuhai-Macau Transborder Industrial Park	2006	Posto Fronteiriço do Parque Industrial Transfronteiriço, Macau	Bilateral traffic only
Guangdong	Gangzhu'ao Bridge	2017	Hong Kong-Zhuhai-Macao Bridge Control Point, Hong Kong	
Guangdong	Gangzhu'ao Bridge	2017	Posto Fronteiriço Da Ponte Hong Kong-Zhuhai-Macau, Macau	
Guangdong	Qingmao Port	2017	Posto Fronteiriço Qingmao, Macau	Pedestrian only
Guangxi	Friendship Pass	1992	Đồng Đăng, Vietnam	
Guangxi	Friendship Pass	1992	Tân Thanh, Vietnam	
Guangxi	Friendship Pass	1992	Cốc Nam, Vietnam	
Guangxi	Dongxing	1992	Móng Cái, Vietnam	
Guangxi	Shuikou	1992	Tà Lùng, Vietnam	
Guangxi	Longbang	2003	Trà Lĩnh, Vietnam	Bilateral traffic only
Guangxi	Pingmeng	2011	Sóc Giang, Vietnam	Bilateral traffic only
Guangxi	Aidian	2015	Chi Ma, Vietnam	Bilateral traffic only
Guangxi	Dongzhong	2017	Hoành Mô, Vietnam	Bilateral traffic only
Guangxi	Shuolong	2017	Lý Vạn, Vietnam	Bilateral traffic only
Yunnan	Ruili	1978	Muse, Myanmar	Bilateral traffic only
Yunnan	Wanding	1952	Pang Hseng, Myanmar	Bilateral traffic only
Yunnan	Tengchong Houqiao	2000	Kanpaikti, Myanmar	Bilateral traffic only
Yunnan	Mengding	2004	Chinshwehaw, Myanmar	Bilateral traffic only
Yunnan	Daluo	2007	Mong La, Myanmar	Bilateral traffic only
Yunnan	Hekou	2011	Lào Cai, Vietnam	
Yunnan	Jinshuihe	1954	Ma Lù Thàng, Vietnam	Bilateral traffic only
Yunnan	Tianbao	1954	Thanh Thủy, Vietnam	
Yunnan	Dulong	2015	Xín Mần, Vietnam	
Yunnan	Mohan	1992	Boten, Laos	
Yunnan	Mengkang	2011	Lantouy, Laos	
Tibet	Zhangmu	1961	Kodari, Nepal	
Tibet	Gyirong Port	1961	Rasuwa Fort, Nepal	Destroyed by 2026 Nepal floods
Tibet	Burang	1961	Yari, Nepal	Bilateral traffic only
Tibet	Burang	1992	Gunji, India	
Gansu	Mazongshan	1992	Norin-Sebestei, Mongolia	Bilateral traffic only Out of service; crossing closed by Mongolia in 1993.
Xinjiang	Laoyemiao	1992	Bugat, Mongolia	Bilateral traffic only
Xinjiang	Ulatay	1992	Baitag, Mongolia	Bilateral traffic only
Xinjiang	Takshin	1989	Bulgan, Mongolia	
Xinjiang	Kiziltaw	1992	Dayan, Mongolia	Bilateral traffic only
Xinjiang	Aqimbek	1994	Terekty, Kazakhstan	Bilateral traffic only
Xinjiang	Jeminay	1994	Maykapshagay, Kazakhstan	
Xinjiang	Baktu	1994	Bakhty, Kazakhstan	
Xinjiang	Alashankou	1990	Dostyk, Kazakhstan	
Xinjiang	Port of Khorgos	1983	Khorgos, Kazakhstan	
Xinjiang	Dulata	1994	Kolzhat, Kazakhstan	Bilateral traffic only
Xinjiang	Muzha'erte	1994	Narynkol, Kazakhstan	Bilateral traffic only
Xinjiang	Tu'ergate	1983	Torugart Pass, Kazakhstan	
Xinjiang	Yierkeshitan	1998	Erkeshtam, Kazakhstan	
Xinjiang	Hongqilafu	1982	Sust, Pakistan	
Xinjiang	Karasu	2007	Kulma Pass, Tajikistan	

=== Railways ===
As of 2016, the People's Republic of China had a total of 11 Class I border railway ports, and six Class I inland railway ports.

In 2016 statistics, the railway port with the highest import and export freight volume was the Manzhouli Railway Port in Inner Mongolia, with an annual volume of 13,957,721 tons, followed by the Erenhot Railway Port in Inner Mongolia, with 9,703,068 tons, and the Suifenhe Railway Port in Heilongjiang, with 8,875,453 tons. The largest number of passengers entering and leaving the country was at Guangzhou Railway Port in Guangdong, with 3,362,499, followed by 390,043 at Dongguan Railway Port in Guangdong and 184,700 at Suifenhe Railway Port in Heilongjiang. The railway port with the largest number of inbound and outbound trains was Manzhouli Railway Port in Inner Mongolia with 8,869 trains, followed by the Erenhot Railway Port with 8,688 trains, Alashankou Railway Port in Xinjiang with 8,379 trains, and Guangzhou Railway Port with 7,985 trains.

==== Border ====
All international trains passing through these border crossings are subject to border control there.

Province	Name	Opening year	Connects to	Notes
Inner Mongolia	Manzhouli	1989	Zabaykalsk, Russia	
Inner Mongolia	Erenhot	1956	Zamiin-Uud, Mongolia	
Inner Mongolia	Ganq Mod	2007	Gashuun Sukhait, Mongolia	Bilateral traffic only
Inner Mongolia	Ceke	2003	Shivee Khuren, Mongolia	
Inner Mongolia	Zhu'engadabuqi	1992	Erdenetsagaan, Mongolia	
Liaoning	Dandong	1954	Sinŭiju Ch'ŏngnyŏn, North Korea	
Jilin	Ji'an	1954	Manpo, North Korea	
Jilin	Tumen	1954	Namyang, North Korea	
Jilin	Hunchun	1998	Kamyshovyy, Russia	
Heilongjiang	Suifenhe	1952	Pogranichny, Russia	
Guangxi	Pingxiang	1992	Đồng Đăng, Vietnam	
Yunnan	Hekou	1953	Lào Cai, Vietnam	
Yunnan	Mohan	2021	Boten, Laos	
Xinjiang	Alashankou	1990	Dostyk, Kazakhstan	
Xinjiang	Khorgas	2014	Altynkol, Kazakhstan	

==== Inland ====
Some inland ports do not have "direct entry and exit" required by law to be ports of entry. These ports operate with restrictions as "temporary ports".

Province	Name	Opening year	Railway station	Connects to	Notes
Jilin	Changchun	2016	Xinglongshan	European Union	Temporary. Used by Trans-Eurasia Logistics.
Heilongjiang	Harbin	1996	Harbin	Russia	
Heilongjiang	Harbin	1996	Xiangfang	European Union	Used by Trans-Eurasia Logistics
Shanghai	Shanghai	2009	Yangpu	European Union	Used by Trans-Eurasia Logistics
Shanghai	Shanghai	2009	Luchaogang	European Union	Used by Trans-Eurasia Logistics
Zhejiang	Yiwu	2015	Yiwu	European Union	Temporary. Used by Trans-Eurasia Logistics.
Jiangxi	Ganzhou	2016	Ganzhou International Port	European Union	Temporary. Used by Trans-Eurasia Logistics.
Henan	Zhengzhou	1997	Putian West	European Union	Temporary. Used by Trans-Eurasia Logistics.
Hubei	Wuhan	2015	Wuhan Railway Container Transport Center	European Union	Temporary. Used by Trans-Eurasia Logistics.
Guangdong	Guangzhou	1979	Dalang	European Union	Used by Trans-Eurasia Logistics.
Guangdong	Dongguan	2015	Shilong	European Union	Temporary. Used by Trans-Eurasia Logistics.
Guangdong	Guangzhou–Shenzhen–Hong Kong Express Rail Link	2018	Hong Kong West Kowloon	HSR Kowloon West Control Point, Hong Kong	Control point located in Hong Kong and operates under mainland China laws.
Chongqing	Chongqing	2013	Tuanjiecun	European Union	Temporary
Sichuan	Chengdu	2014	Chengxiang	European Union	Temporary. Used by Trans-Eurasia Logistics.
Shaanxi	Xi'an	2014	Xi'an Guojigang	European Union	Temporary. Used by Trans-Eurasia Logistics.
Gansu	Lanzhou	2016	Zhongchuan North	European Union	Temporary. Used by Trans-Eurasia Logistics.
Gansu	Lanzhou	2016	Yingchuanpu	European Union	Temporary. Used by Trans-Eurasia Logistics.
Xinjiang	Ürümqi	2016	Ürümqi West	European Union	Temporary. Used by Trans-Eurasia Logistics.

=== Seaports ===
As of 2016, the People's Republic of China had 82 Type I seaports. According to 2016 statistics, the port with the largest import and export cargo volume was Qingdao Water Transport Port in Shandong, with an annual transport volume of 298,370,511 tons, followed by Tangshan Water Transport Port in Hebei with 294,365,760 tons, and Shanghai Water Transport Port with 276,327,246 tons. (Note: As these statistics are port of entry measurements, they count only passengers and cargo entering or leaving the country in international flights or ships. Total throughput numbers for ports such as Shanghai and Beijing are much larger when including domestic cargo and passengers.)The port with the largest number of inbound and outbound passengers was the Shanghai Water Transport Port with 4,382,056 passengers, followed by the Guangdong Shekou Water Transport Port with 3,222,543 passengers and the Xiamen Water Transport Port of Entry with 2,251,615 passengers. The port with the largest number of inbound and outbound vessels is Guangdong Shekou Port of Entry with 60,023 vessels, followed by Shanghai Maritime Port with 25,551 vessels and Fujian Xiamen Water Port with 21,677 vessels.

Province	Name	Opening year	Seaport	Notes
Tianjin	Tianjin	1860	Tianjin	
Tianjin	Bozhong	1988	China National Offshore Oil Corporation offshore oil delivery point	
Hebei	Qinhuangdao	1898	Qinhuangdao	
Hebei	Tangshan	1992	Tangshan	
Hebei	Huanghua	2002	Huanghua	
Liaoning	Dalian	1960	Dalian	
Liaoning	Lushun Xingang	2006	Dalian	
Liaoning	Zhuanghe	2007	Dalian	
Liaoning	Changxingdao	2011	Dalian	
Liaoning	Yingkou	1984	Yingkou	
Liaoning	Panjin	2015	Panjin	
Liaoning	Dandong	1985	Dandong	
Liaoning	Jinzhou	1989	Jinzhou	
Liaoning	Huludao	1999	Huludao	
Shanghai	Shanghai	1842	Shanghai	
Jiangsu	Lianyungang	1956	Lianyungang	
Jiangsu	Dafeng	2006	Yancheng	
Jiangsu	Yancheng	2017	Yancheng	
Jiangsu	Rudong	2014	Nantong	
Jiangsu	Qidong	2014	Nantong	
Zhejiang	Ningbo	1979	Ningbo-Zhoushan	Includes temporary PoE area
Zhejiang	Zhoushan	1986	Ningbo-Zhoushan	
Zhejiang	Wenzhou	1957	Wenzhou	
Zhejiang	Taizhou	1989	Taizhou	Includes temporary PoE area
Zhejiang	Jiaxing	1996	Jiaxing	
Fujian	Fuzhou	1842	Fuzhou	
Fujian	Pingtan	2014	Fuzhou	
Fujian	Ningde	1993	Fuzhou	
Fujian	Putian	1995	Putian	
Fujian	Quanzhou	1981	Quanzhou	
Fujian	Zhangzhou	1991	Xiamen	
Fujian	Xiamen	1842	Xiamen	
Shandong	Qingdao	1953	Qingdao	
Shandong	Dongjiakou	2016	Qingdao	
Shandong	Yantai	1953	Yantai	
Shandong	Longkou	1984	Yantai	
Shandong	Penglai	1996	Yantai	
Shandong	Laizhou	1996	Yantai	
Shandong	Weihai	1984	Weihai	
Shandong	Shidao	1988	Weihai	
Shandong	Longyan	1999	Weihai	
Shandong	Rizhao (Note: On December 28, 2016, the State Council approved merging Shishu Port and Lanshan Port into Rizhao Port.)	1986	Rizhao	
Shandong	Dongying	1995	Dongying	
Shandong	Weifang	2007	Weifang	
Guangdong	Guangzhou	1963	Guangzhou	
Guangdong	Nansha	1992	Guangzhou	
Guangdong	Lianhuashan	1985	Guangzhou	
Guangdong	Pazhou	2023	Guangzhou	
Guangdong	Yantian Wharves	1990	Shenzhen	
Guangdong	Shenzhen Dachanwan	2009	Shenzhen	
Guangdong	Daya Bay Special Wharf	1985	Shenzhen	Serves the Daya Bay Nuclear Power Plant
Guangdong	Xichong	1983	Shenzhen	
Guangdong	Meisha	1984	Shenzhen	
Guangdong	Shekou Industrial Area	1981	Shenzhen	
Guangdong	Chiwan Wharf	1984	Shenzhen	
Guangdong	Mawan Wharf	1990	Shenzhen	
Guangdong	Dongjiaotou	1987	Shenzhen	
Guangdong	Fuyong	1992	Shenzhen Bao'an International Airport	
Guangdong	Huizhou	1993	Huizhou	
Guangdong	Humen	1997	Dongguan	
Guangdong	Shanwei	1988	Shanwei	
Guangdong	Chaozhou	1994	Chaozhou	
Guangdong	Jieyang	2010	Jieyang	
Guangdong	Shantou	1860	Shantou	
Guangdong	Chaoyang	1996	Shantou	
Guangdong	Nan'ao	1993	Shantou	
Guangdong	Zhuhai	1994	Zhuhai	
Guangdong	Jiuzhou	1981	Zhuhai	
Guangdong	Wanshan	1995	Zhuhai	
Guangdong	Wanzai Ferry	1984	Zhuhai	
Guangdong	Jiangmen	1996	Jiangmen	
Guangdong	Guangmei	1985	Jiangmen	
Guangdong	Yangjiang	1993	Yangjiang	
Guangdong	Zhanjiang	1956	Zhanjiang	
Guangdong	Maoming	1988	Maoming	
Guangxi	Beihai	1950	Beibu Gulf	
Guangxi	Shitoubu	1994	Beibu Gulf	
Guangxi	Qinzhou	1994	Beibu Gulf	
Guangxi	Fangchenggang	1983	Beibu Gulf	
Hainan	Haikou	1957	Haikou	
Hainan	Sanya	1984	Sanya	
Hainan	Qinglan	1996	Qinglan	
Hainan	Yangpu	1990	Yangpu	
Hainan	Basuo	1988	Basuo	

=== Rivers ===
As of 2016, the People's Republic of China has a total of 44 Class I river ports and 11 Class I boundary river ports on the Songhua, Heilongjiang, Ussuri, Yangtze, Pearl, and Lancang rivers. Boundary river ports between China and Russia utilize ship transportation during the clear water period, and road transportation during the ice closure period.

In 2016 statistics, the river port with the largest volume of import and export freight was Zhangjiagang Water Transport Port in Jiangsu, with an annual volume of 76,256,569 tons, followed by Taicang Waterway Port in Jiangsu with 62,180,070 tons and Nantong Waterway Port with 51,403,683 tons, also in Jiangsu. The river port with the largest number of people entering and leaving the country was Guangdong's Zhongshan Water Transportation Port with 1,339,634 person-times, followed by Heilongjiang's Heihe with 718,521 person-times and Guangdong's Shunde with 632,295 person-times. The port with the largest number of inbound and outbound vehicles was Zhongshan Port with 20,071 trips, followed by Shunde with 10,819 trips, and Heihe with 8,523 trips, in addition to having 31,959 vehicles entering and exiting the country during the ice closure period.

Province	Name	Established	River port	Notes
Jilin	Da'an	1990	Da'an	
Heilongjiang	Harbin	1989	Harbin	
Heilongjiang	Jiamusi	1989	Jiamusi	
Heilongjiang	Huachuan	1994	Jiamusi	
Heilongjiang	Fujin	1989	Jiamusi	
Heilongjiang	Suibin	1995	Suibin	
Jiangsu	Nanjing	1986	Nanjing	
Jiangsu	Nantong	1982	Nantong	
Jiangsu	Rugao	2008	Nantong	
Jiangsu	Zhangjiagang	1982	Suzhou	
Jiangsu	Taicang	1995	Suzhou	
Jiangsu	Changshu	1995	Suzhou	
Jiangsu	Zhenjiang	1986	Zhenjiang	
Jiangsu	Jiangyin	1992	Jiangyin	
Jiangsu	Yangzhou	1992	Yangzhou	
Jiangsu	Taizhou	1992	Taizhou	
Jiangsu	Jingjiang	2012	Taizhou	
Jiangsu	Changzhou	2001	Changzhou	
Anhui	Wuhu	1980	Wuhu	
Anhui	Tongling	1993	Tongling	
Anhui	Anqing	1986	Anqing	
Anhui	Ma'anshan	1990	Ma'anshan	
Anhui	Chizhou	2005	Chizhou	
Jiangxi	Jiujiang	1980	Jiujiang	
Hubei	Wuhan	1992	Wuhan	
Hubei	Huangshi	1993	Huangshi	
Hunan	Chenglingji	1996	Yueyang	
Guangdong	Xintang	1995	—	Chinese-flagged ships only
Guangdong	Doumen	1987	Zhuhai	Chinese-flagged ships only
Guangdong	Zhongshan	1984	Zhongshan	
Guangdong	Nanhai	1985	Foshan	Chinese-flagged ships only
Guangdong	Rongqi	1986	Foshan	Chinese-flagged ships only
Guangdong	Gaoming	1992	Foshan	Chinese-flagged ships only
Guangdong	Zhaoqing	1982	Zhaoqing	Chinese-flagged ships only
Guangdong	Jiangmen	1981	Jiangmen	Chinese-flagged ships only
Guangdong	Xinhui	1992	Jiangmen	
Guangdong	Heshan	1988	Jiangmen	Chinese-flagged ships only
Guangdong	Sanbu	1982	Jiangmen	Chinese-flagged ships only
Guangxi	Wuzhou	1982	Wuzhou	Chinese-flagged ships only
Guangxi	Guigang	1992	Guigang	Chinese-flagged ships only
Guangxi	Liuzhou	1988	Liuzhou	Chinese-flagged ships only
Chongqing	Chongqing	2010	Chongqing	Chinese-flagged ships only
Sichuan	Yibin	2018	Yibin	Temporary
Sichuan	Luzhou	2018	Luzhou	Temporary
Shanghai	Pujiang	2013	Pujiang	
Yunnan	Jinghong	1993	Jinghong	
Yunnan	Simao	1993	Simao	

=== Border river ===
Province	Name	Opening year	Port name	Connects to	Notes
Heilongjiang	Fuyuan	1992	Jiamushi	Khabarovsk, Russia	
Heilongjiang	Tongjiang	1986	Jiamushi	Nizhneleninskoye, Russia	
Heilongjiang	Luobei	1989	Luobei	Amurzet, Russia	
Heilongjiang	Jiayin	1989	Jiayin	Pashkovo, Russia	
Heilongjiang	Heihe	1982	Heihe	Blagoveshchensk, Russia	
Heilongjiang	Xunke	1989	Heihe	Poyarkovo, Russia	
Heilongjiang	Sunwu	1993	Heihe	Konstantinovka, Russia	Unopened due to construction delays on the Russian side
Heilongjiang	Huma	1993	Huma	Ushakovo, Russia	Unopened due to construction delays on the Russian side
Heilongjiang	Mohe	1989	Mohe	Dzhalinda, Russia	Inactive since 2007 due to Russian changes to Dzhalinda Port operations
Heilongjiang	Raohe	1989	Raohe	Pokrovka, Russia	

=== Airports ===
Air Transportation Ports of Entry (APE), also known as Aviation Ports of Entry, are categorized into two types: Class I aviation ports, open to all airlines, and Restricted (限制类) Class I aviation ports, open only to aircraft flying the Chinese flag. According to the "Regulations of the State Council on the Opening of Ports of Entry", issued on 18 September 1985, the opening of an Air Transport Port of Entry must always be subject to State Council approval.

According to the requirements of the Civil Aviation Administration of China (CAAC), to officially become an "international airport", the airport must meet the requirements of a port of entry, meet the requirements to allow the flight of foreign airplanes, and the acceptance of the joint inspection facilities by the State Port Administration Office. As of January 12, 2024, the People's Republic of China has a total of 83 Class I APE (adding up to 86 actual airports), including 60 official international airports, 16 international airports that have not yet been named as such, 4 airports with restricted access, and 6 airports that have not yet passed the acceptance for a port of entry. There are also 18 temporarily open aviation ports, and in emergencies, ports may be open exceptionally: Guanghan Airport, which is not a civil transportation airport, was temporarily opened to the public during the Wenchuan earthquake relief efforts.

In 2016 statistics, the port with the largest number of arrivals and departures was the Shanghai Air Transport Port, with an annual volume of 37,927,468 passengers, followed by the Beijing Air Transportation Port with 24,252,289 passengers, and the Guangdong Guangzhou Air Transport Port with 13,219,779 passengers. The port with the largest volume of import and export cargo was the Shanghai APE, with 4,746,330 tons, followed by the Beijing APE with 1,853,736 tons, and the Guangzhou APE in Guangdong Province with 1,631,938 tons. The largest number of inbound/outbound flights was at the Shanghai APE with 234,047, followed by 131,483 at the Beijing APE, and 93,616 at the Guangzhou APE in Guangdong Province.

Province	Name	Established	Airport	Notes
Beijing	Beijing	1954	Beijing Capital International	
Beijing	Beijing	2019	Beijing Daxing International	
Tianjin	Tianjim	1981	Tianjin Binhai International	
Hebei	Shijiazhuang	1995	Shijiazhuang Zhengding International	
Hebei	n/a	2007	Qinhuangdao Beidaihe	Temporary
Shanxi	Taiyuan	1993	Taiyuan Wusu International	
Shanxi	Datong	2019	Datong Yungang	
Shanxi	Yuncheng	2020	Yuncheng Zhangxiao	
Shanxi	n/a	2019	Xinzhou Wutaishan	Temporary
Inner Mongolia	Hohhot	1991	Hohhot Baita International	
Inner Mongolia	Ordos	2016	Ordos Ejin Horo International	
Inner Mongolia	Erenhot	2021	Erenhot Saiwusu	
Inner Mongolia	Baotou	2019	Baotou Donghe	
Inner Mongolia	n/a	2019	Ulanqab Jining	Temporary
Inner Mongolia	Manzhouli	2009	Manzhouli Xijiao	
Inner Mongolia	Hailar	1993	Hulunbuir Hailar	
Inner Mongolia	n/a	2015	Arxan Yiershi	Temporary
Liaoning	Shenyang	1959	Shenyang Taoxian International	
Liaoning	n/a	2013	Jinzhou Jinzhouwan	Temporary
Liaoning	Dalian	1985	Dalian Zhoushuizi International	
Liaoning	n/a	2007	Dandong Langtou	Temporary
Jilin	Changchun	1992	Changchun Longjia International	
Jilin	Yanji	2003	Yanji Chaoyangchuan International	
Heilongjiang	Harbin	1984	Harbin Taiping International	
Heilongjiang	Qiqihar	1993	Qiqihar Sanjiazi	
Heilongjiang	Mudanjiang	1996	Mudanjiang Hailang International	
Heilongjiang	Jiamusi	1992	Jiamusi Dongjiao	
Heilongjiang	n/a	1992	Heihe Aihui	Temporary
Heilongjiang	n/a	2016	Fuyuan Dongji	Temporary
Shanghai	Shanghai	1963	Shanghai Hongqiao International	
Shanghai	Shanghai	1999	Shanghai Pudong International	
Jiangsu	Nanjing	1979	Nanjing Lukou International	
Jiangsu	Xuzhou	2008	Xuzhou Guanyin International	
Jiangsu	Yancheng	2007	Yancheng Nanyang International	
Jiangsu	Wuxi	2008	Wuxi Shuofang International	
Jiangsu	Changzhou	2014	Changzhou Benniu International	
Jiangsu	Huaian	2014	Huaian Lianshui International	
Jiangsu	Yangtai	2015	Yangzhou Taizhou International	
Jiangsu	Nantong	2015	Nantong Xingdong International	
Zhejiang	Hangzhou	1979	Hangzhou Xiaoshan International	
Zhejiang	Wenzhou	1994	Wenzhou Longwan International	
Zhejiang	Yiwu	2014	Yiwu	
Zhejiang	Zhoushan	2018	Zhoushan Putuoshan	
Zhejiang	Ningbo	1992	Ningbo Lishe International	
Anhui	Hefei	1990	Hefei Xinqiao International	
Anhui	Huangshan	1992	Huangshan Tunxi International	
Fujian	Fuzhou	1982	Fuzhou Changle International	
Fujian	Wuyishan	1993	Wuyishan	Only connections with Hong Kong
Fujian	Quanzhou	2009	Quanzhou Jinjiang International	
Fujian	Xiamen	1983	Xiamen Gaoqi International	
Jiangxi	Nanchang	1990	Nanchang Changbei International	
Jiangxi	n/a	2019	Ganzhou Huangjin	Temporary
Shandong	Jinan	1990	Jinan Yaoqiang International	
Shandong	-	2015	Weifang	Temporary
Shandong	Qingdao	1988	Qingdao Jiaodong International	
Shandong	Yantai	1992	Yantai Penglai International	
Shandong	Weihai	2004	Weihai Dashuipo	
Shandong	Linyi	2019	Linyi Qiyang International	
Henan	Zhengzhou	1988	Zhengzhou Xinzheng International	
Henan	Luoyang	1992	Luoyang Beijiao	Restricted
Hubei	Wuhan	1987	Wuhan Tianhe International	
Hubei	Yichang	2005	Yichang Sanxia	
Hubei	-	2023	Ezhou Huahu	Temporary
Hubei	-	2019	Xiangyang Liuji	Temporary
Hunan	Changsha	1990	Changsha Huanghua International	
Hunan	Zhangjiajie	1997	Zhangjiajie Hehua International	
Guangdong	Guangzhou	1956	Guangzhou Baiyun International	
Guangdong	Shenzhen	1992	Shenzhen Bao'an International	
Guangdong	Jieyang	1986	Jieyang Chaoshan International	
Guangdong	Meizhou	1989	Meizhou Meixian	Restricted
Guangdong	Zhanjiang	1987	Zhanjiang Wuchuan	
Guangdong	-	2009	Zhuhai Jinwan	Temporary
Guangxi	Nanning	1956	Nanning Wuxu International	
Guangxi	Guilin	1979	Guilin Liangjiang International	
Guangxi	Beihai	1993	Beihai Fucheng	Restricted
Guangxi	-	2018	Liuzhou Bailian	Temporary
Hainan	Haikou	1983	Haikou Meilan International	
Hainan	Sanya	1983	Sanya Fenghuang International	
Chongqing	Chongqing	1987	Chongqing Jiangbei International	
Sichuan	Chengdu	1981 &2021	Chengdu Shuangliu International	
Sichuan	Chengdu	1981	Chengdu Tianfu International	
Guizhou	Guiyang	1992	Guiyang Longdongbao International	
Guizhou	-	2018	Tongren Fenghuang	Temporary
Yunnan	Kunming	1955	Kunming Changshui International	
Yunnan	Xishuangbanna	1995	Xishuangbanna Gasa International	
Yunnan	Lijiang	2011	Lijiang Sanyi International	
Yunnan	Mangshi	2016	Dehong Mangshi International	
Yunnan	-	1962	Pu'er Simao	Temporary
Tibet	Lhasa	1993	Lhasa Gonggar	
Shaanxi	Xi'an	1981	Xi'an Xianyang International	
Shaanxi	-	2018	Yulin Yuyang	Temporary
Gansu	Lanzhou	1992	Lanzhou Zhongchuan International	
Gansu	Dunhuang	2015	Dunhuang Mogao International	
Qinghai	Xining	2006	Xining Caojiapu International	
Ningxia	Yinchuan	2005	Yinchuan Hedong International	
Xinjiang	Ürümqi	1973	Ürümqi Tianshan International	
Xinjiang	Kashgar	1993	Kashgar Laining International	
Xinjiang	Yining	2016	Yinin	
Xinjiang	-	2017	Karamay Guhai	Temporary

== Images ==
Images of various ports of entry of China

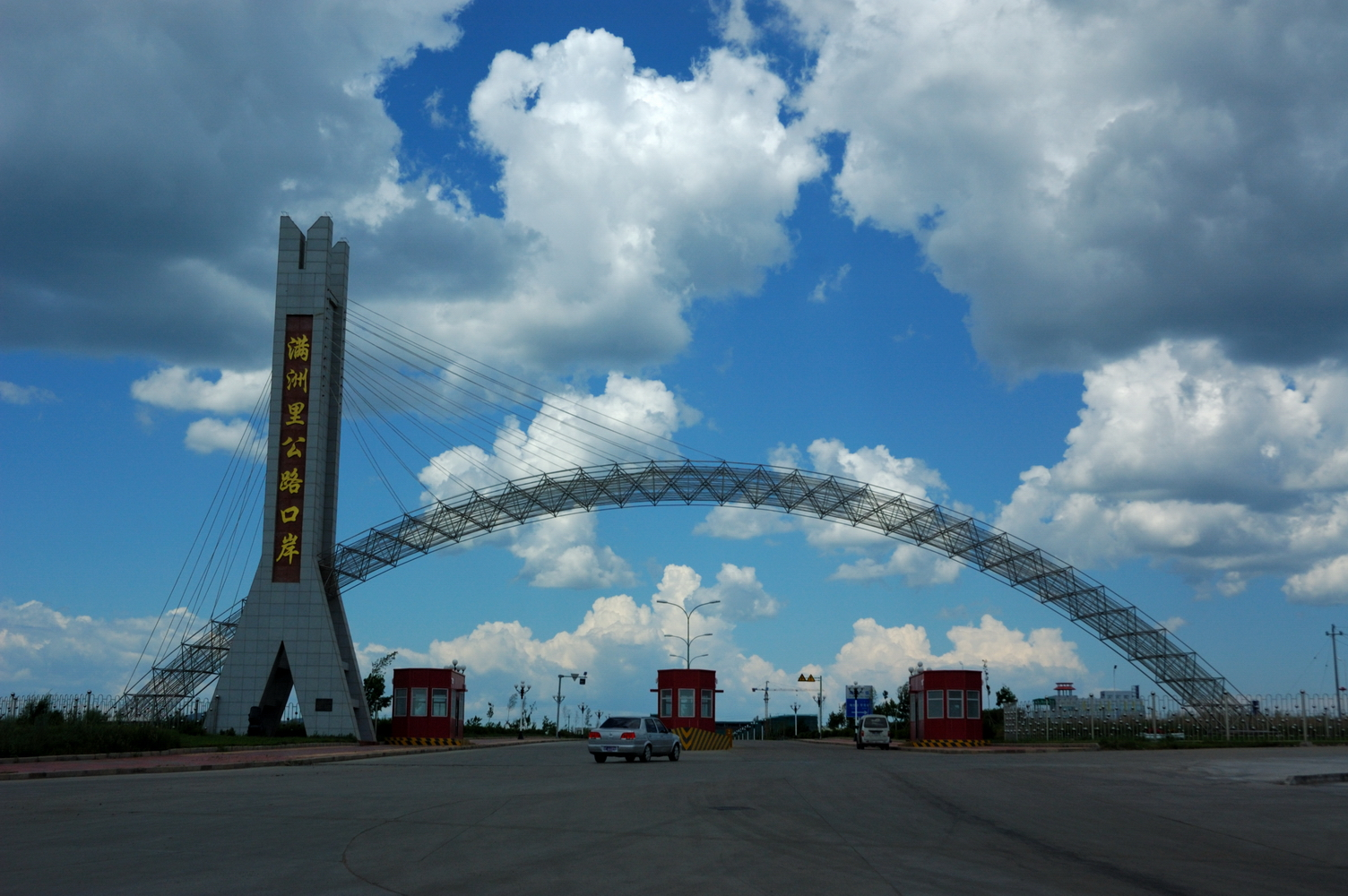
Manzhouli Road PoE

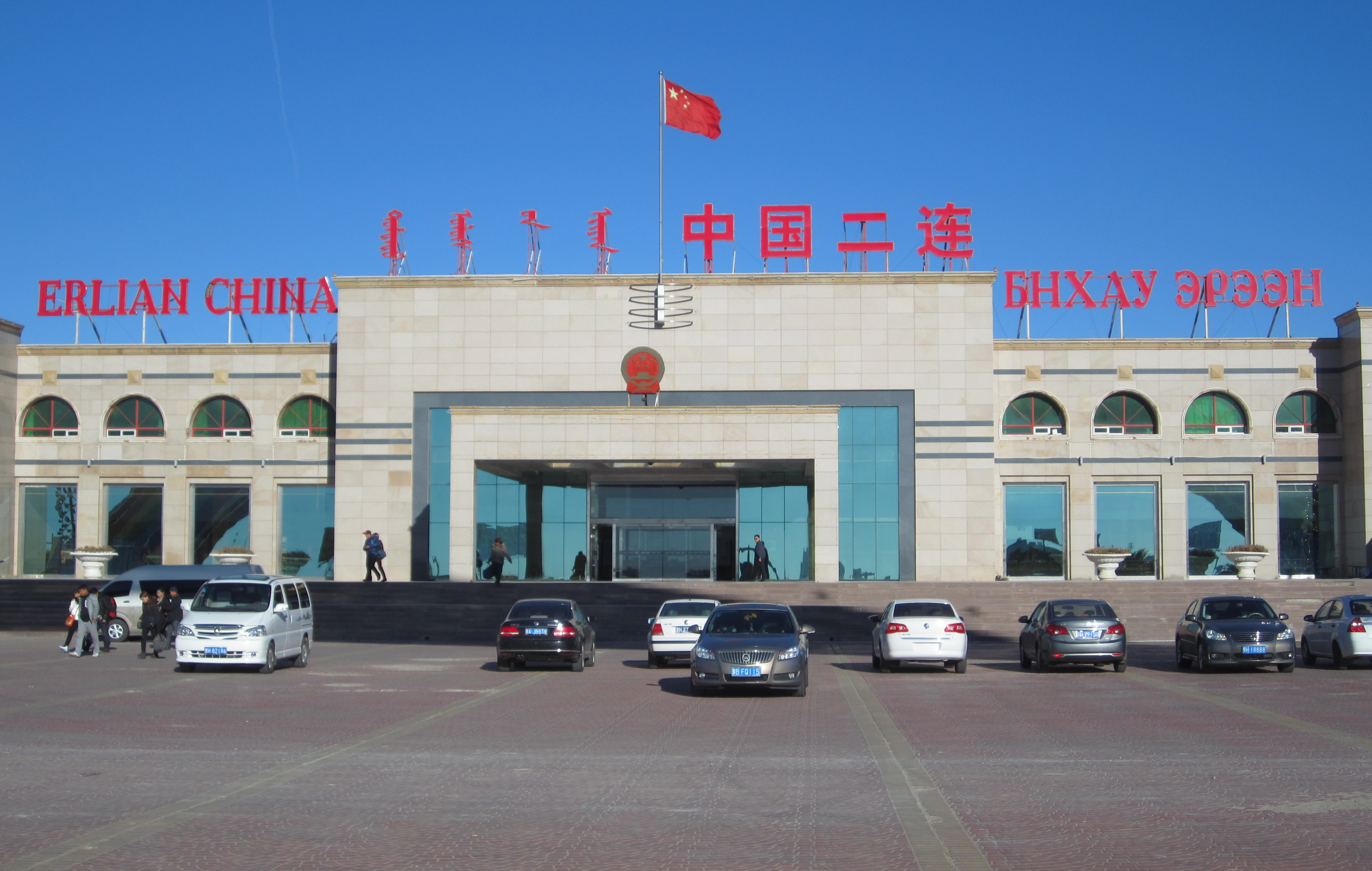
Erenhot Road PoE

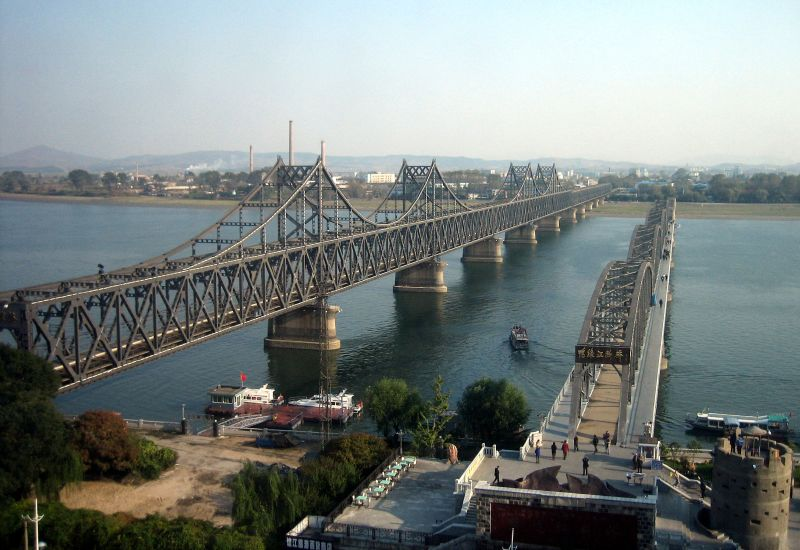
Dandong PoE, the Sino-Korean Friendship Bridge towards North Korea

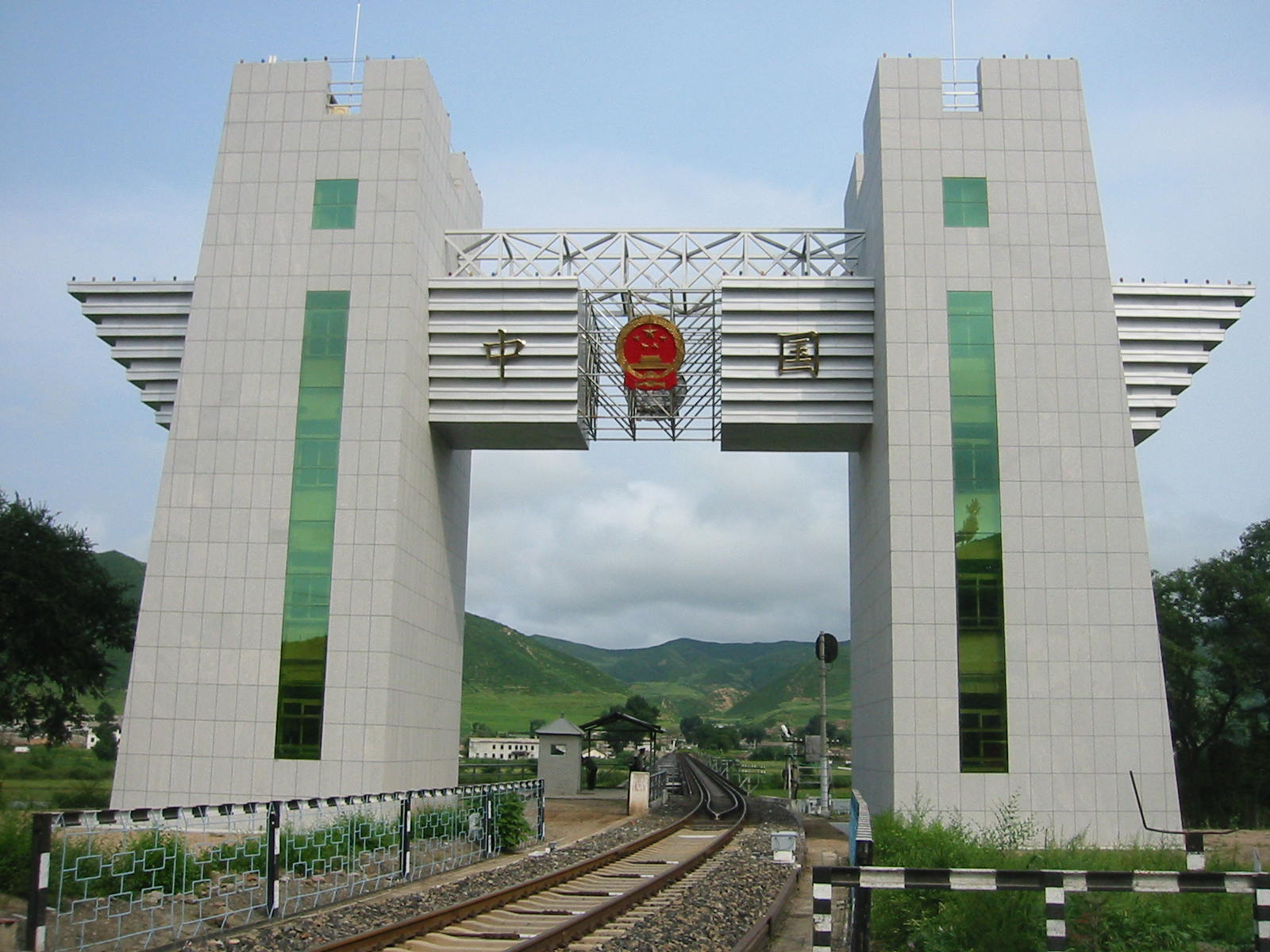
Tumen Railway PoE

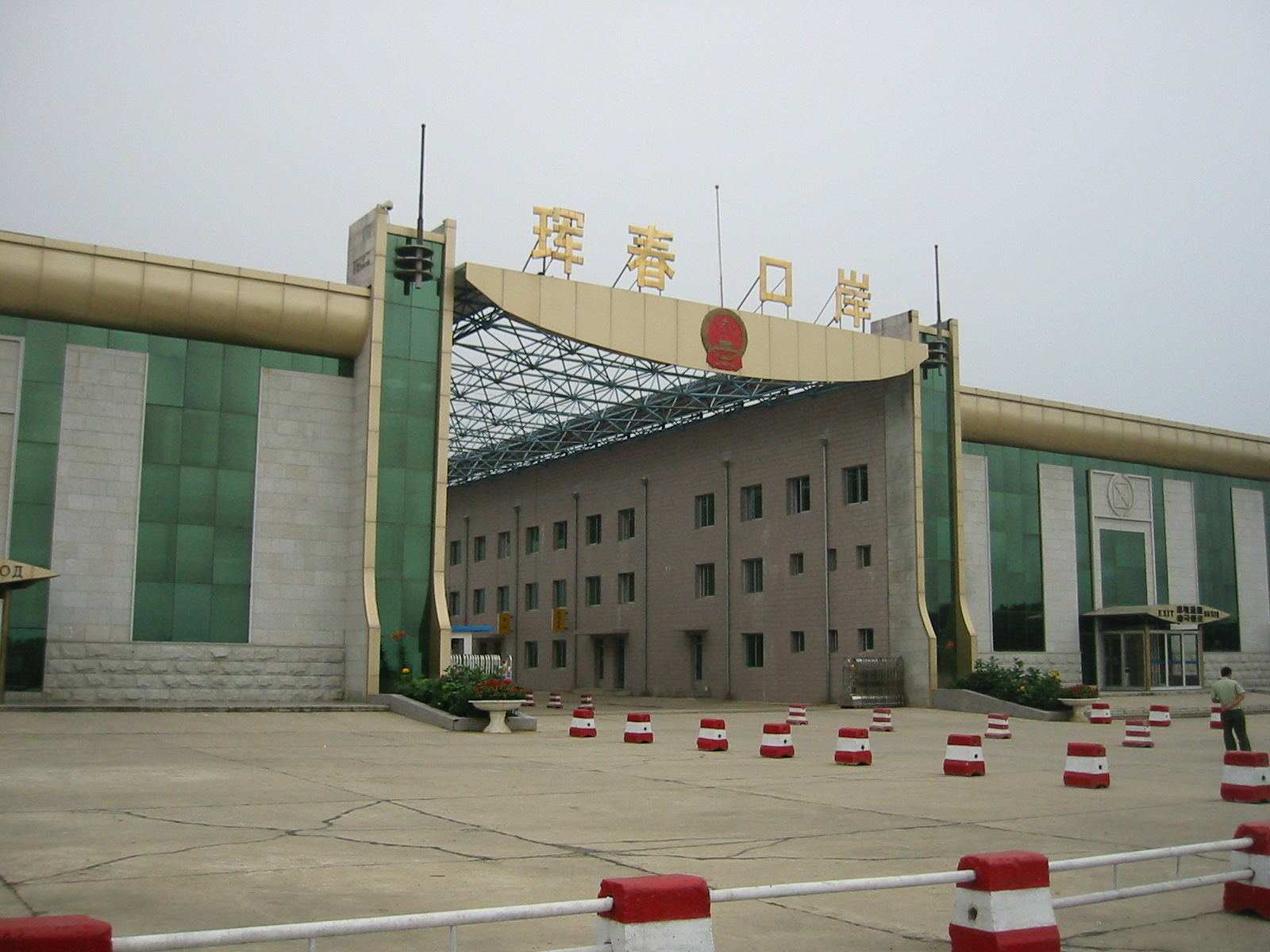
Hunchun PoE

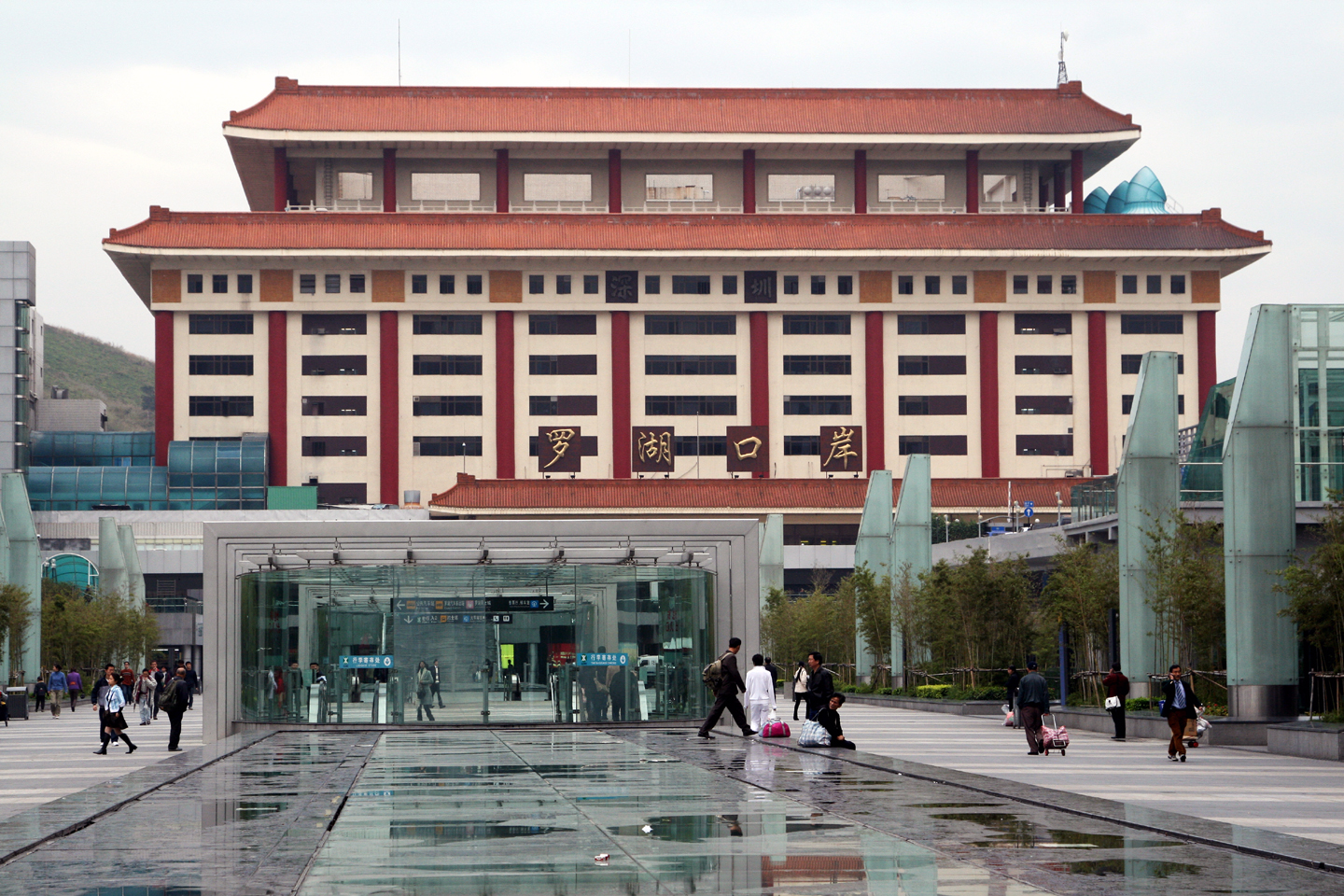
Lo Wu Control Point

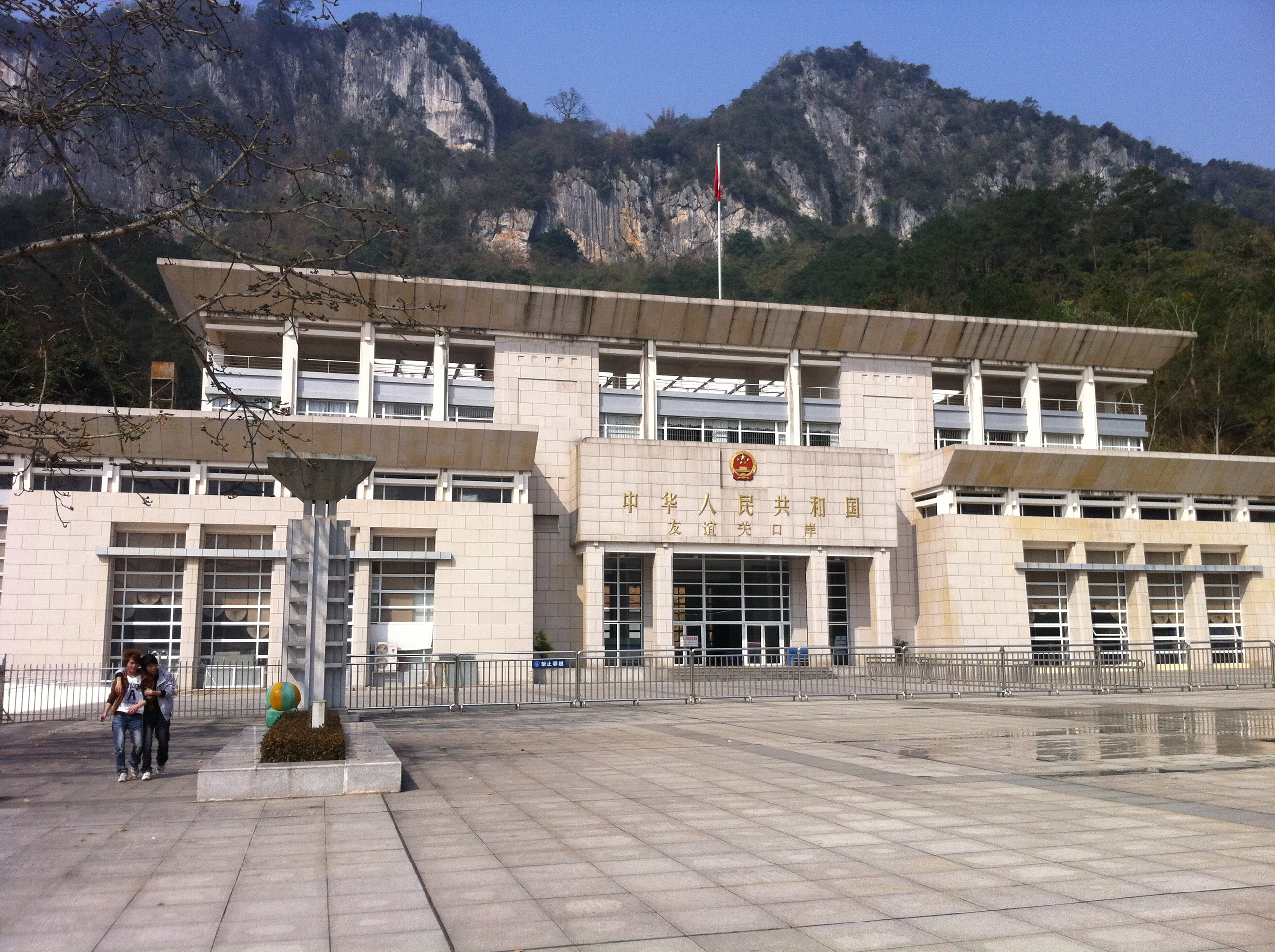
Sino-Vietnamese border, Pingxiang, Friendship Pass

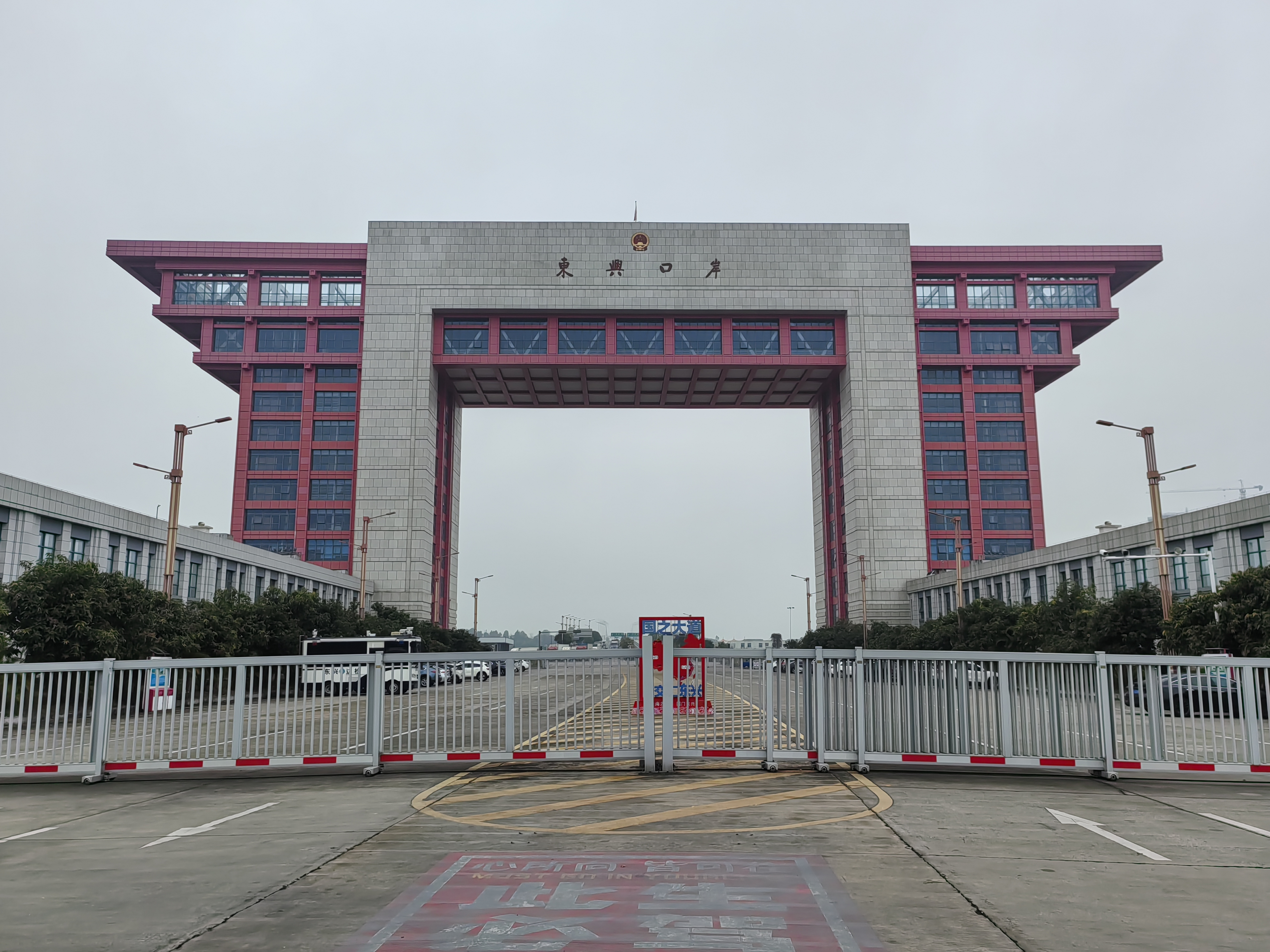
Dongxing PoE

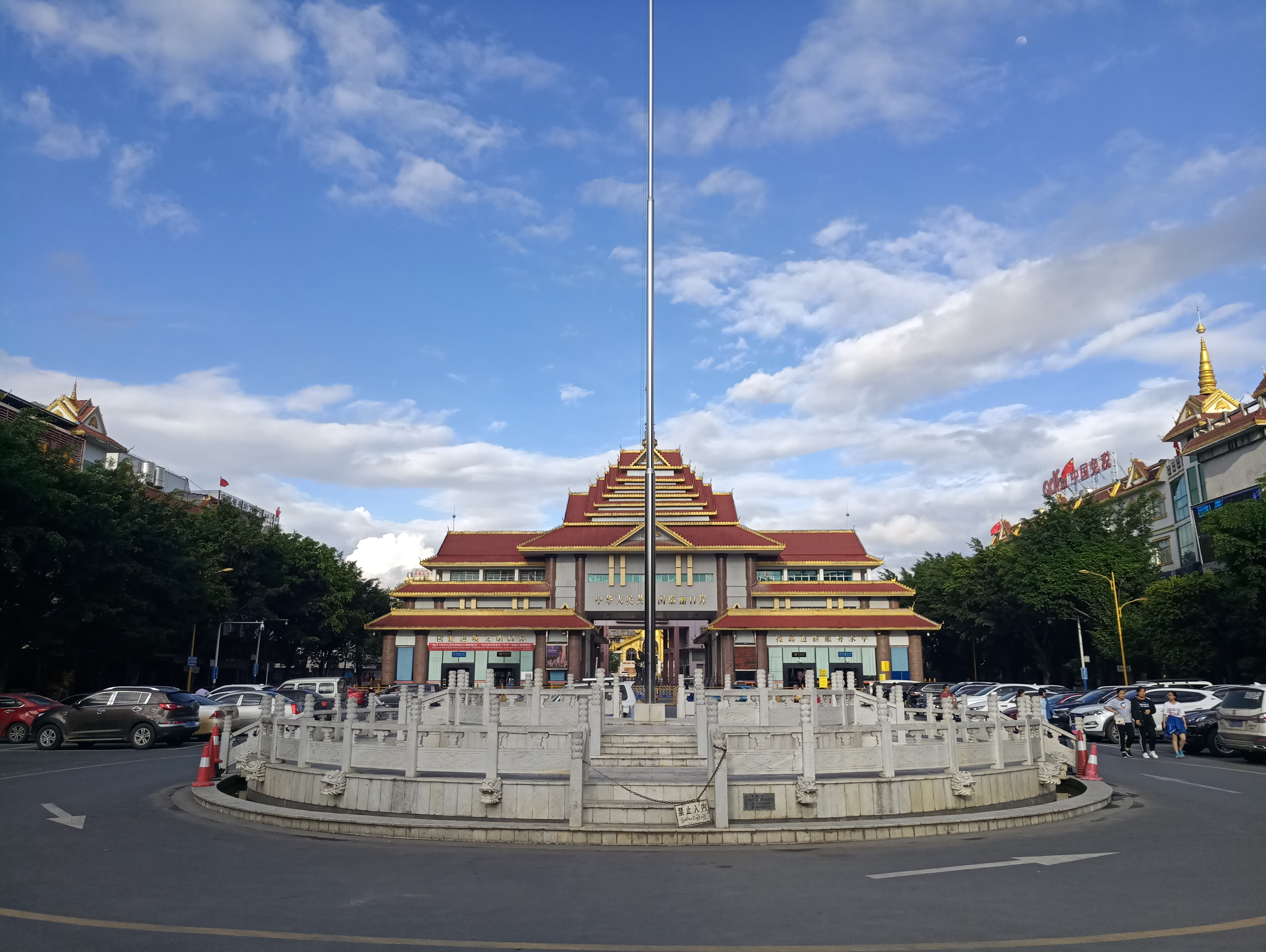
Ruili PoE

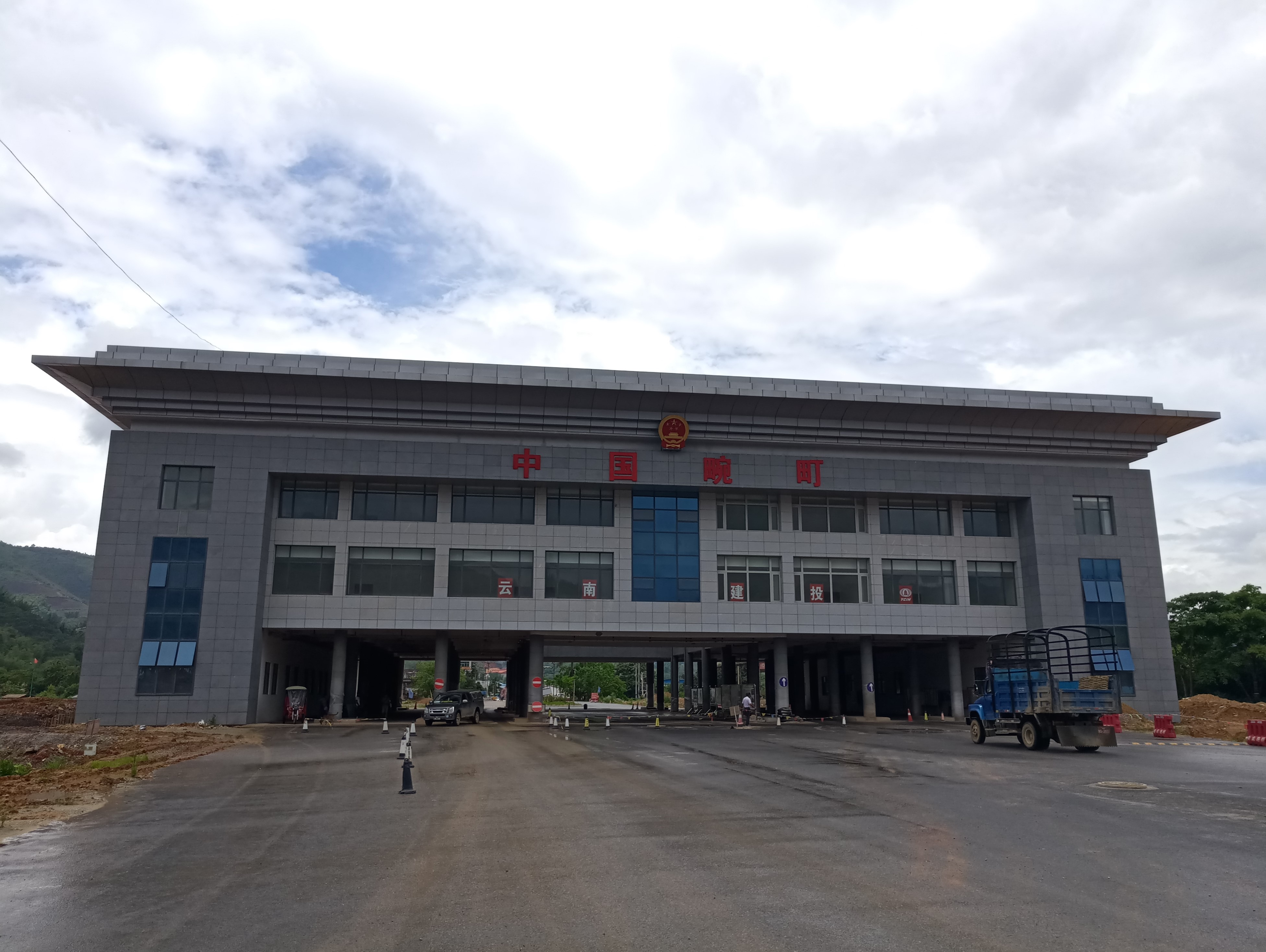
Wanding PoE, Mangman Crossing

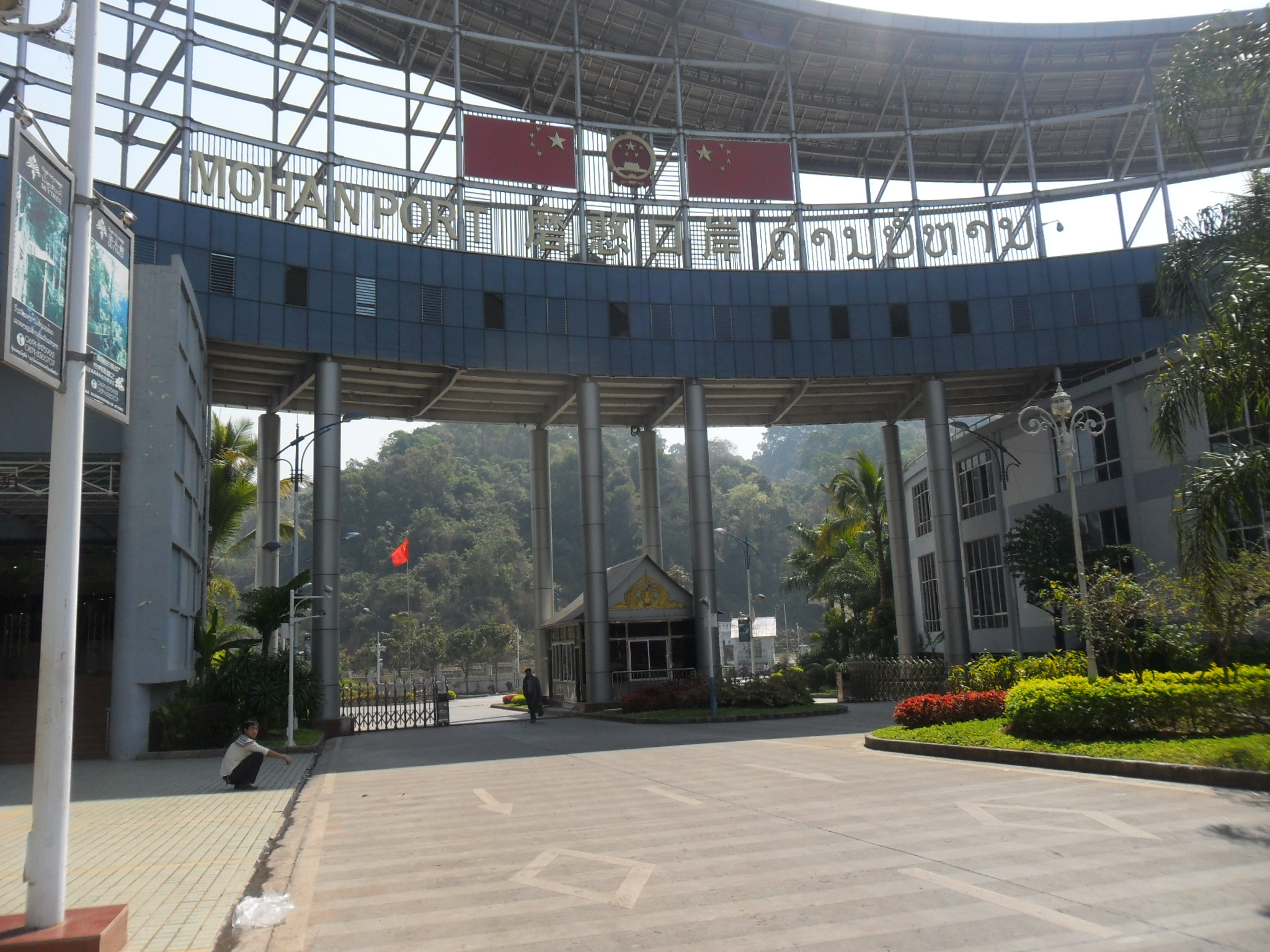
Mohan PoE

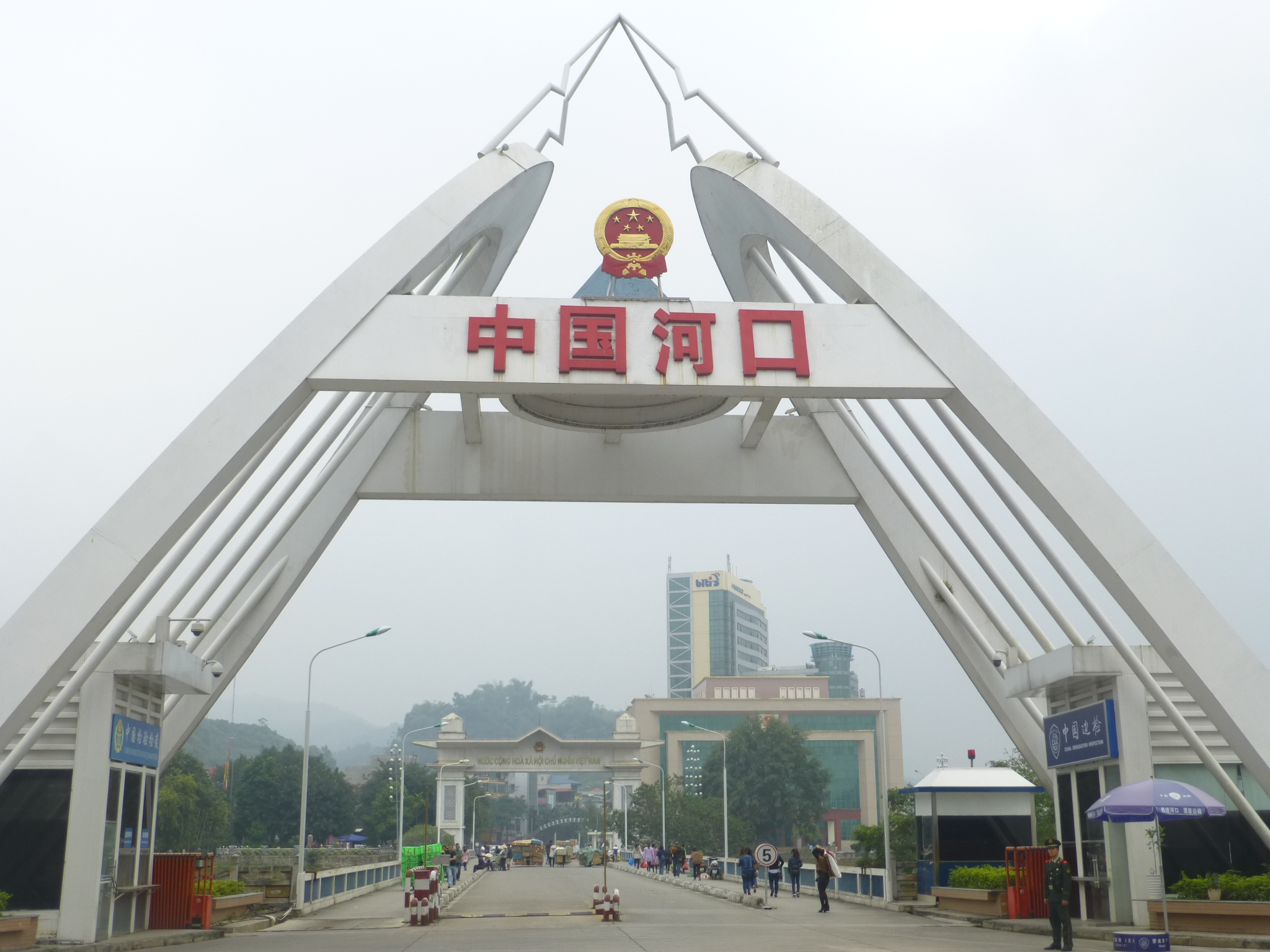
Hekou PoE

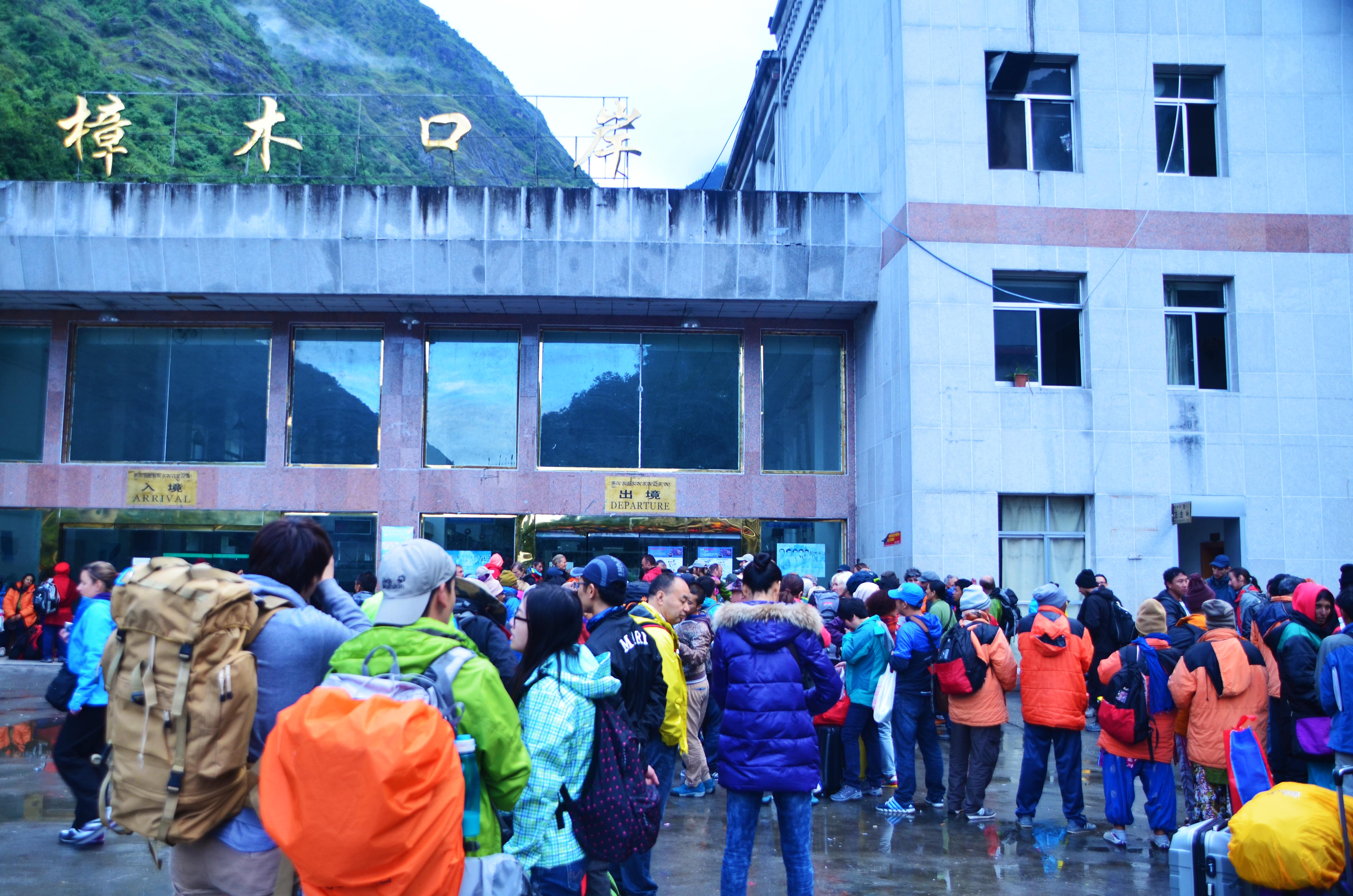
Zhangmu border crossing

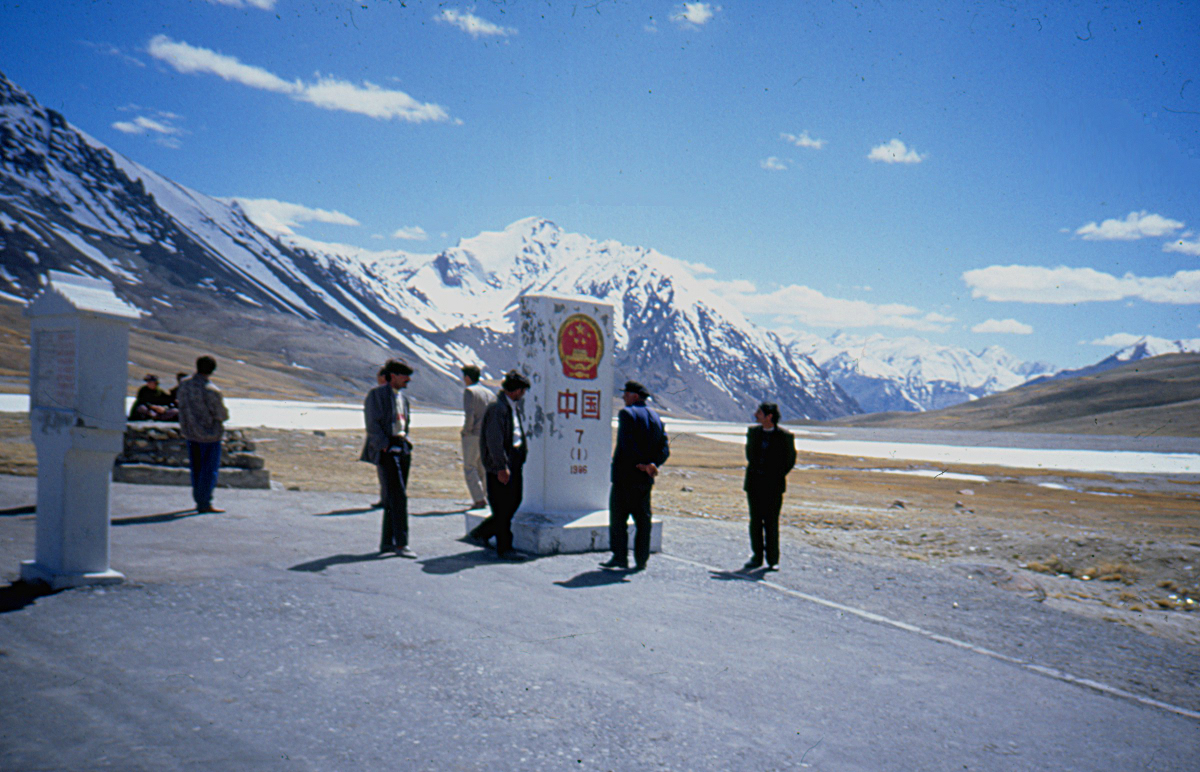
Kashgar, Khunjerab Pass 's boundary marker

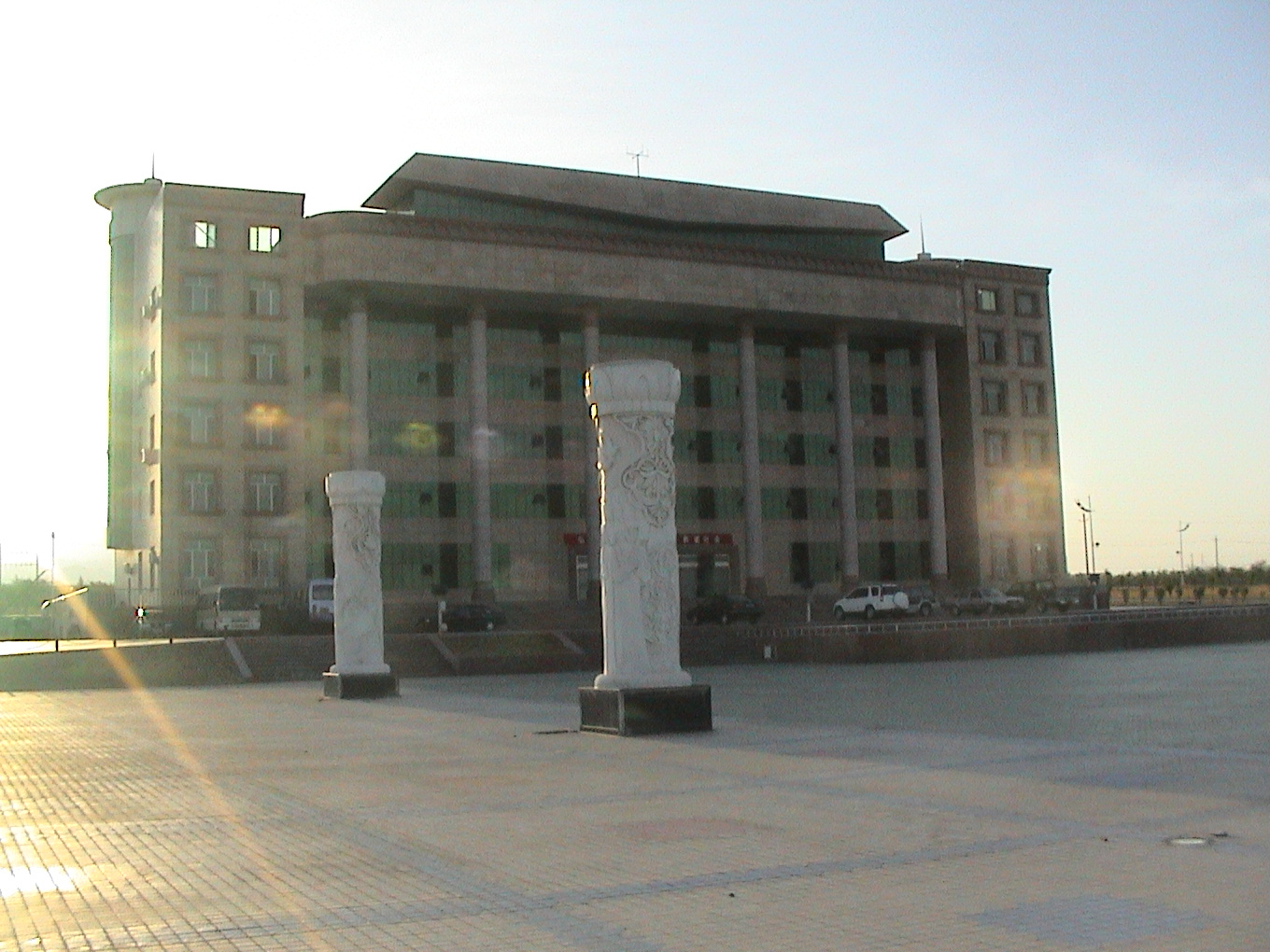
Alataw Pass PoE

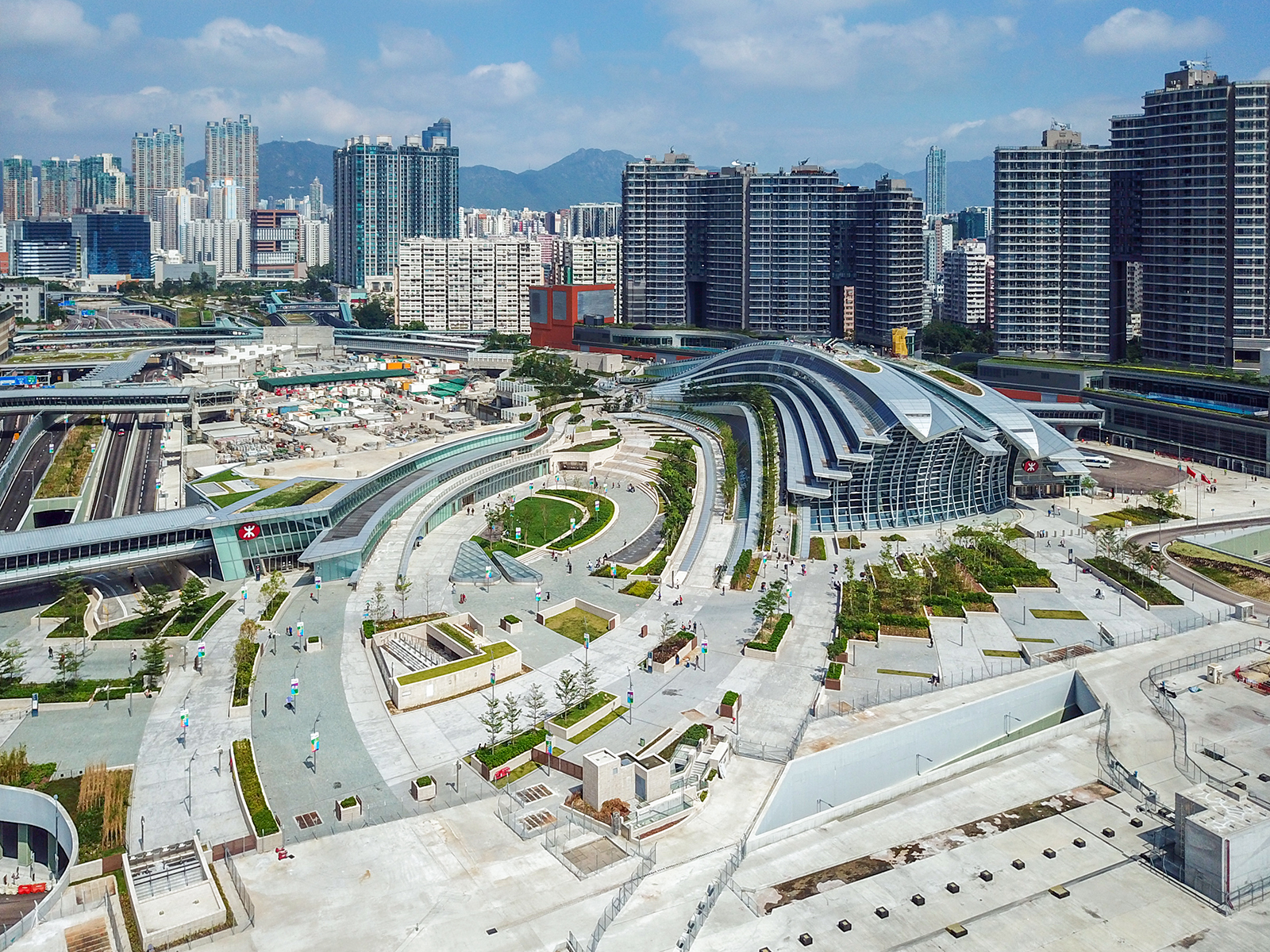
West Kowloon Station, Hong Kong

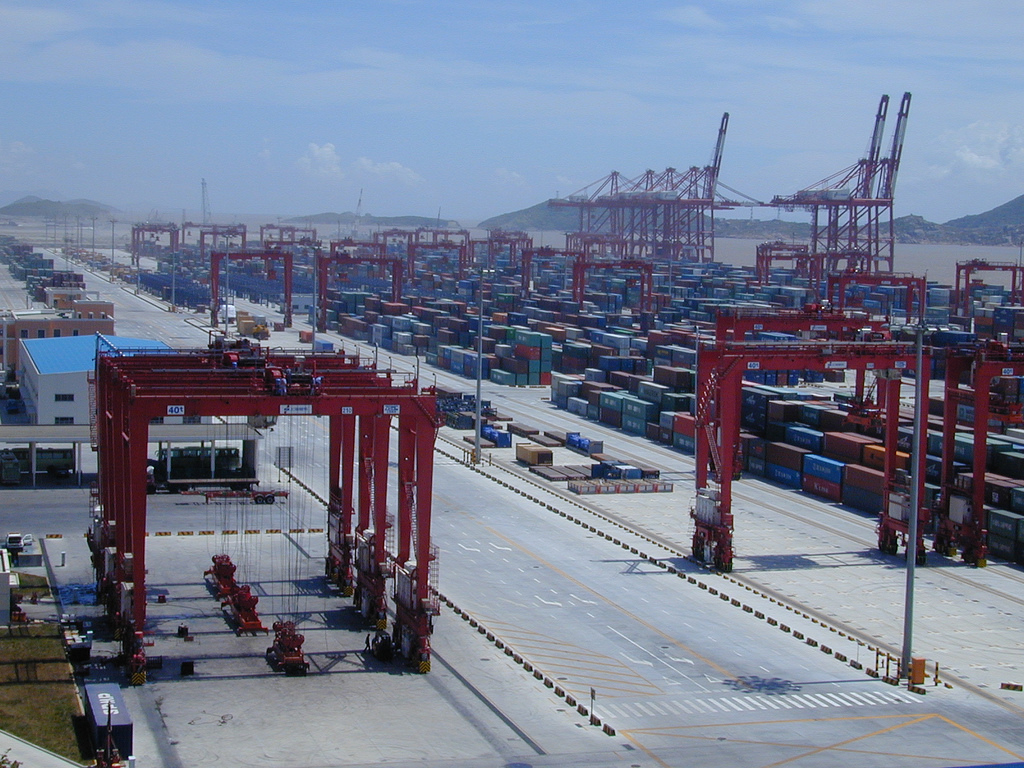
Port of ShanghaiYangshan Deep-water Harbour

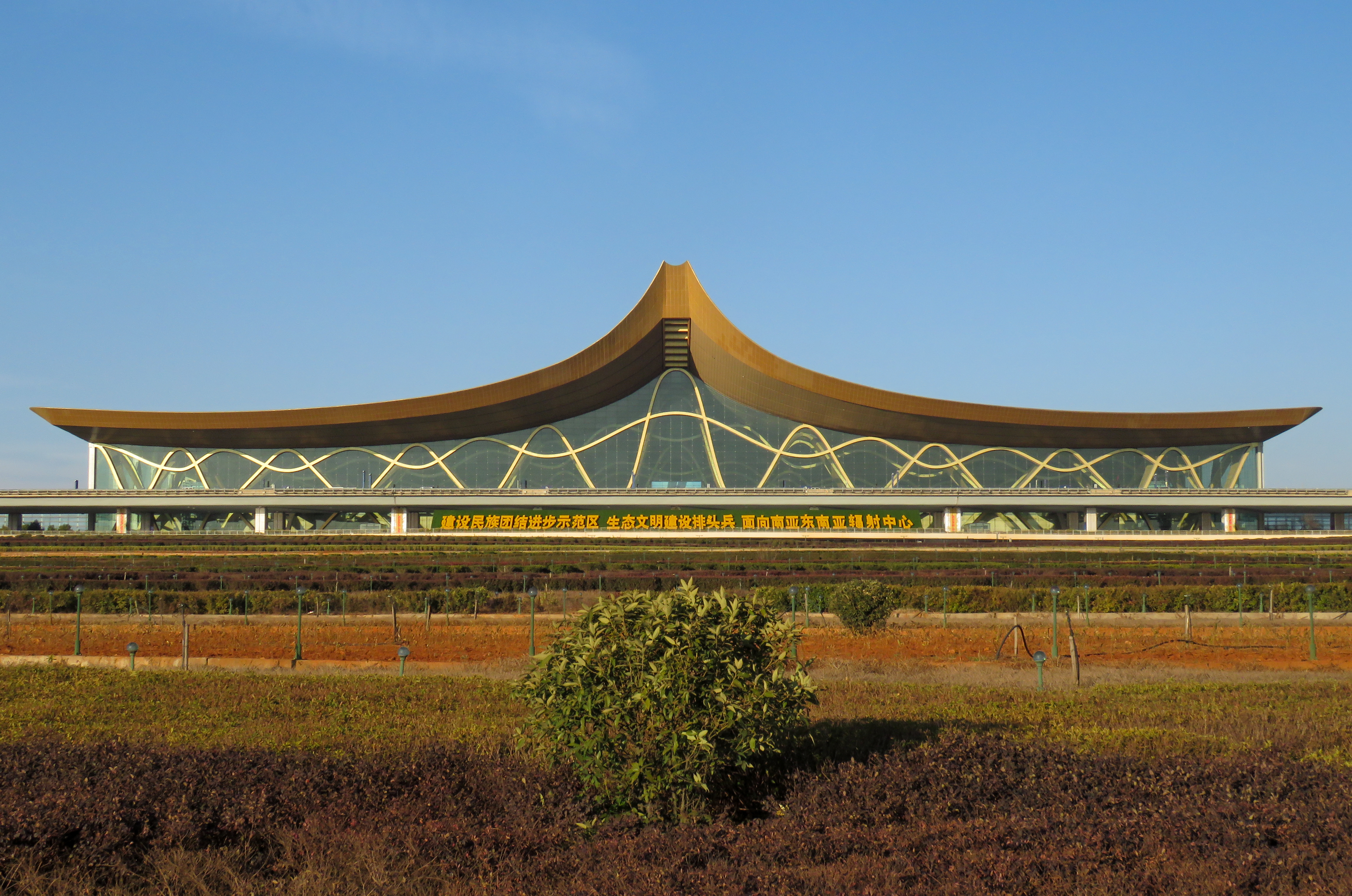
Kunming Changshui International Airport

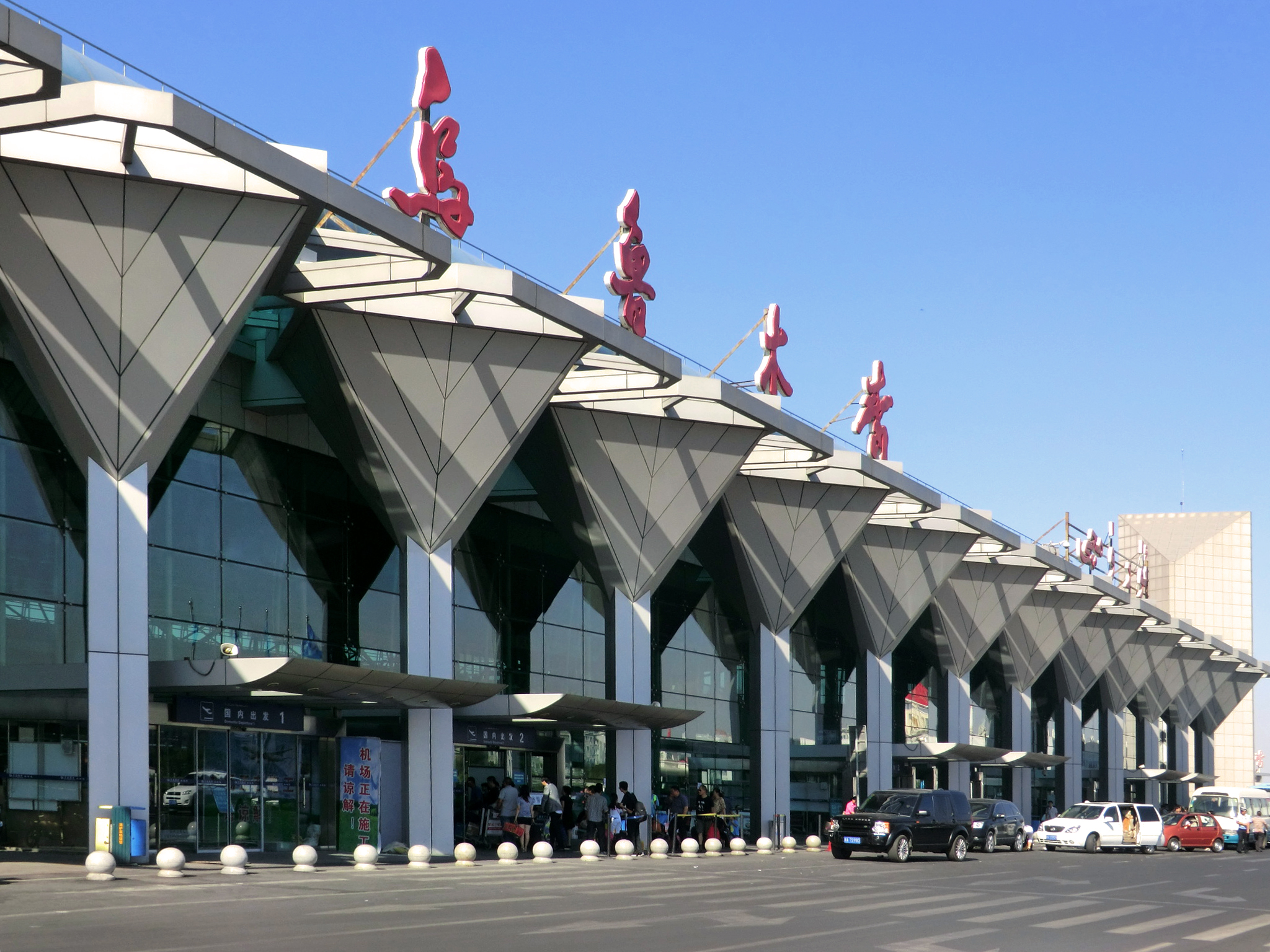
Ürümqi international airport

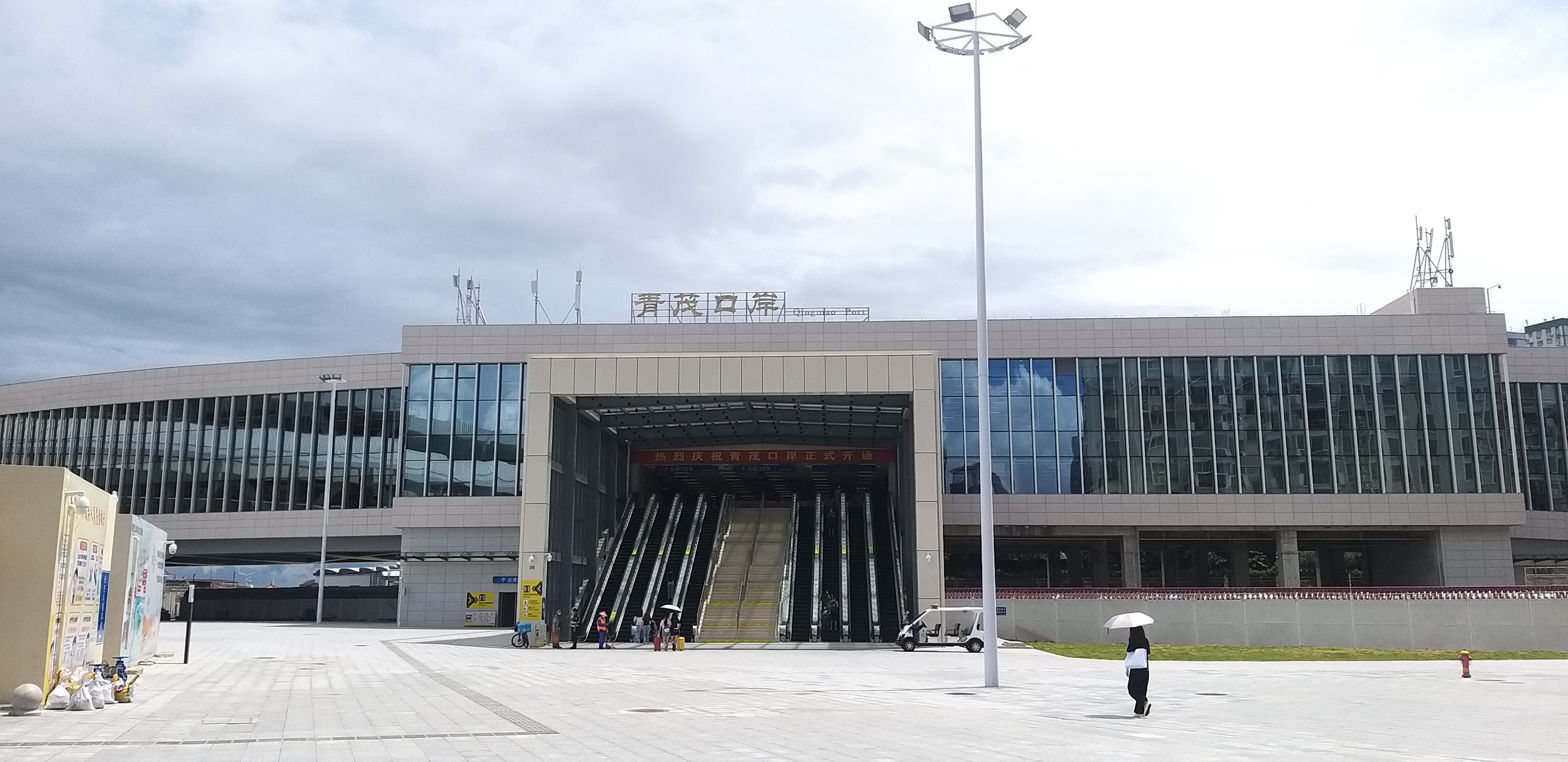
Qingmao Port, Macao

== See also ==
- Borders of China
