= Zhu'engadabuqi railway station =

Border station in Inner Mongolia, China

Zhu'engadabuqi railway station 珠恩嘎达布其站

General information
- Other names: Mongolian: ᠵᠡᠭᠦᠨ ᠬᠠᠲᠠᠪᠴᠢ ᠥᠷᠲᠡᠭᠡ; Зүүн Хатавч өртөө Züün Hatabq / Züün Khatavch örtöö literally: Eastern Threshold station
- Location: Hatabq Town, East Ujimqin Banner; Xilingol League, Inner Mongolia; China
- Coordinates: 45.756018°N 116.31177°E
- Elevation: 831 m (2,726 ft)
- System: Freight station
- Owner: China Railways
- Operator: CR Shenyang
- Lines: Zhusihua–Zhu'engadabuqi railway; Bayanwula–Zhu'engadabuqi railway

Other information
- Station code: TMIS code: 57213; Telegraph code: GND; Pinyin code: gdn; UNLOCODE: CN ZEQ

History
- Opened: July 12, 2014; 12 years ago

Services
Preceding station	China Railway	Following station
Wuzhumuqin towards Zhusihua	Zhusihua–Zhu'engadabuqi railway	Terminus
Location
- Location within Inner Mongolia Location within China

Zhu'engadabuqi railway station is a station in the border of Mongolia and Inner Mongolia, Zhu'endagabuqi port is located at the Sino-Mongolian border marker No. 1046 (1046号界碑处), at Hatabq town, East Ujimqin Banner, Xilingol League. It is a border railway freight station that is part of the Zhu'engadabuqi Port of Entry complex, with its Mongolian counterpart being Bichigt. It transports mostly coal and oil products towards the northern ports in the Bohai Sea.

Mongolia is reportedly building a 426.6 km-long (265.1 mi) railway from Choilbalsan via Khuut to Bichigt. This line would directly connect Zhu'engadabuqi/Züün Hatabq to the Russian railway system (though with a break of gauge), and in the other direction connect it all the way to the port of Jinzhou.

== History ==
The Highway Port of Zhu'engadabuqi was opened on 11 March 1992 as a seasonal bilateral port of entry. 2008 it was extended to a year-long full open port. The construction of a railway line to improve communication with the port resulted in the construction of the Zhuzhu railway. Zhu'engadabuqi station was built as its terminal, and it opened on 12 July 2014. A new line, the Bayanwula-Zhu'engadabuqi line is under construction.

A combination of the COVID-19 pandemic and a fall in demand for Mongolian coal meant that the station closed in January 2022, and stayed closed until 29 November 2023, until China's reopening and restored demand for coal. At present, the daily freight volume of the station is 7,500 tons, and an annual transportation capacity of 5 million to 7 million tons can be achieved in the future.

The Zhu'engadabuqi port managed 2.3 million tons in 2023, a majority transported in its China leg by train. The Port is building very large coal storage yards around the station to accommodate increased trade.

== See also ==
- Ports of Entry of China
