= Qingmao Port =

China–Macau customs checkpoint, next to Gongbei Port

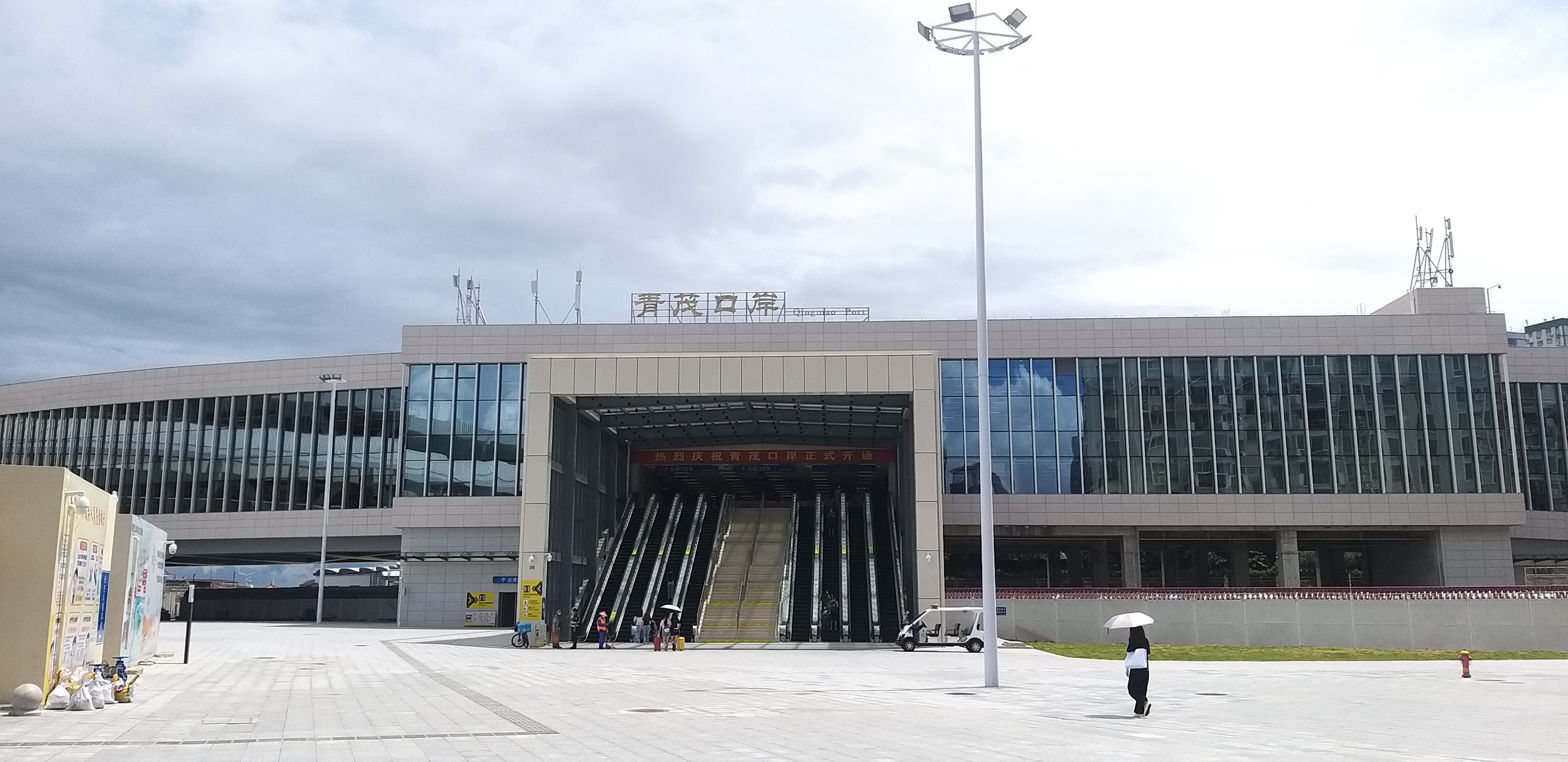
Qingmao Port (Zhuhai)

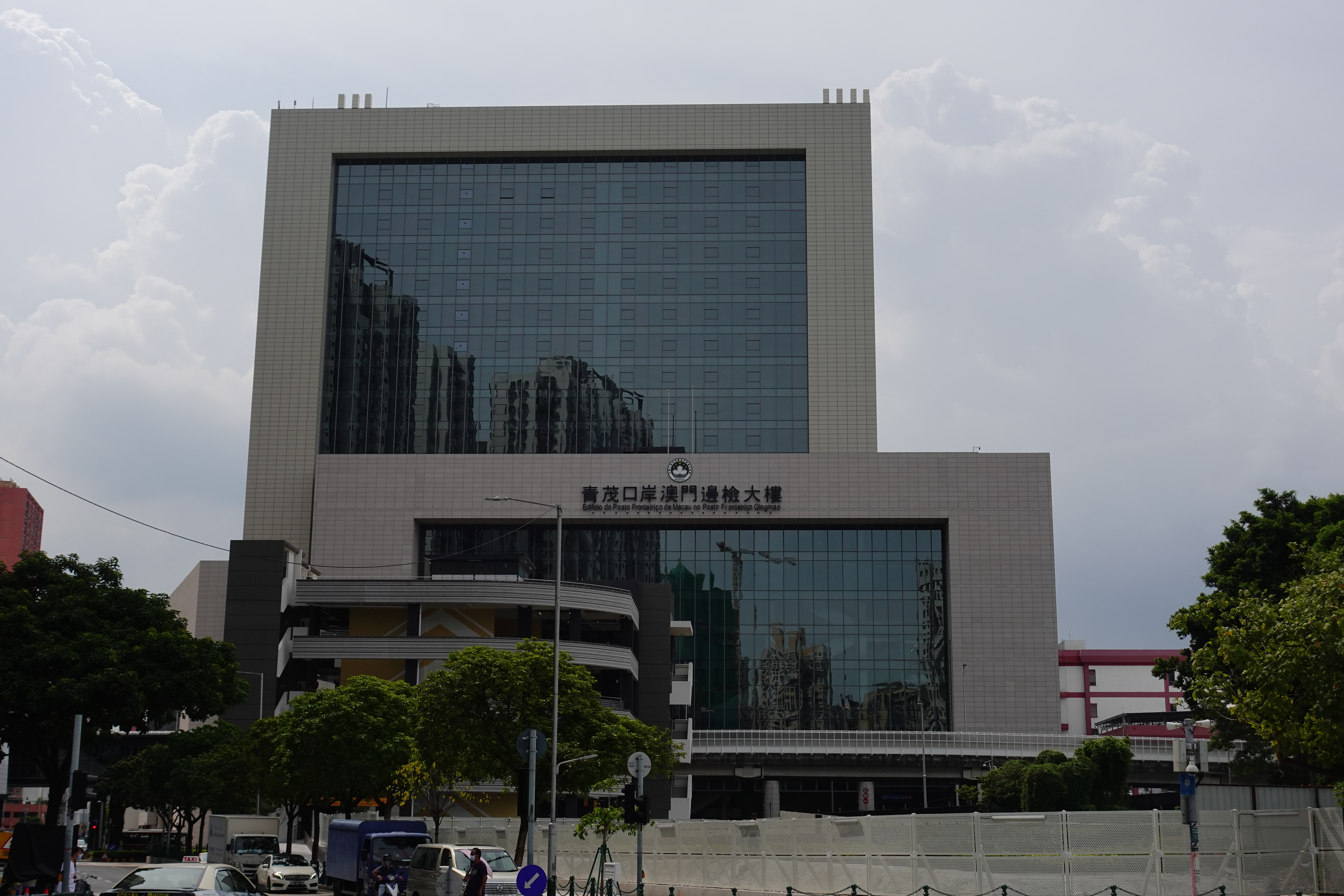
Qingmao Port-Macau Frontier Post Building

Qingmao Port or Qingmao Checkpoint (Chinese: 青茂口岸; Portuguese: Posto Fronteiriço Qingmao), also known as Channel in Guangdong and Macau (Chinese: 粤澳新通道; simplified Chinese: 粤澳新通道; traditional Chinese: 粵澳新通道; lit. 'Guangdong-Macau New Corridor'; Portuguese: Novo Acesso Fronteiriço Guangdong-Macau), connects between the Ilha Verde region in Macau and the Zhuhai railway station, with a designed customs clearance volume of 200,000 passengers. Mainly self-service customs clearance, it can pass through by only pedestrians and there is no vehicle access. Spanning between Guangdong and Macao, it covers an area of approximately 28,000 square meters. The main construction land and construction content are located in Macao, and a small number of facilities are erected over the Canal dos Patos.

The Qingmao Port or Qingmao Checkpoint (Chinese: 青茂口岸) is a regional land border port in the People's Republic of China, connecting the terminal station of Guangzhu intercity railway and located in Xiangzhou, Zhuhai, Guangdong.

The Qingmao Port-Macau Frontier Post Building (Chinese: 青茂口岸澳門邊檢大樓; simplified Chinese: 青茂口岸澳门边检大楼; traditional Chinese: 青茂口岸澳門邊檢大樓; Portuguese: Edifício Posto Fronteiriço de Macau do Posto Fronteiriço Qingmao) is the fifth land cross-border passage between the Macau SAR and Zhuhai, Guangdong, and implements 24-hour customs clearance. This port becomes the second official port between Zhuhai and Macao that is open around the clock.

This port is the third land crossing between Zhuhai and Macao following the HZMB Zhuhai-Macau Port and Hengqin Port. It adopts the customs clearance model of "Joint Inspection and One-Time Release" (simplified Chinese: 合作查验，一次放行; traditional Chinese: 合作查驗，一次放行; Portuguese: "Inspecção Fronteiriça Integral"). During clearance, passengers will first pass through the exit-side inspection area, then undergo document checks by officers from both sides, and finally proceed through the entry-side inspection area.

== History ==
=== Construction process ===
When the Vice Premier of China, Wang Yang, was visiting Macau in early November 2013, he announced that the project has obtained approval for construction. In April 2017, the State Council of China gave official written reply with approval. In early 2018, the main construction work started, and the demolition work of the old Macau Wholesale Market was also carried out simultaneously.

The Qingmao Port project has been approved for daily construction from June 11, 2019, until December 31, with working hours from 8 am to 10 pm. The project includes the Qingmao Port joint inspection building, connecting channel and Canal dos Patos comprehensive improvement project.

On August 8, 2019, "Qingmao Port Pedestrian Bridge Design and Construction Project" was publicly invited for bidding at the Development of Infrastructure of Macau. A total of 14 bids were received, with the longest construction period being 430 working days. After the bid opening procedure, 2 of the 14 bids received were not accepted, and another 2 were conditionally accepted, but required supplementary documents to be submitted within the specified date. The project cost ranges from MOP 75 million to MOP 147 million, and the construction period ranges from 296 working days to 400 working days. The pedestrian bridge connects the Qingmao Port Frontier Post Building to the old vehicle inspection center and the former Municipal Affairs Bureau nursery site and Bairro da Ilha Verde public housing site, crossing Avenida do Comendador Ho Yin in Ilha Verde; the pedestrian bridge is planned to be equipped with elevators, escalators and stairs.

From October 30 to November 1, 2020, "Qingmao Port Pedestrian Bridge Design and Construction Project" imply work of hoisting the bridge, including the two-way lanes of Avenida do Comendador Ho Yin, the sidewalk, and the pedestrian traffic on the road section for coming and going Rua Norte Do Patane. The entire section of the flyover was closed to traffic and five bus routes were diverted.

On November 16, 2020, the Chief Executive of the Macao Special Administrative Region, Ho Iat Seng, delivered the Policy Address of the Macao Special Administrative Region Government for the 2021 fiscal year, stating that the Qingmao Port opens in 2021.

=== Eve of finishing work ===
In April 2021, the Secretary for Transport and Public Works of the Macao Special Administrative Region, Lo Lap Man, said that the construction of the Qingmao Port had been completed by “ninety-something and more (percent)”, but its completion would be delayed until May. On April 26, the Secretary for Security, Wong Sio Chak, attended a Legislative Council panel meeting and stated that the Macau project of the Qingmao Port will be completed around May and internal testing will be carried out. At the same time, it would be conditionally open to the public in the second half of the year as scheduled. The relevant conditions for customs clearance will be subject to the approval of the Mainland project. The progress will be coordinated and tested with the authorities and will be subject to Central's approval.

On May 4, 2021, the construction of Qingmao Port was completed, and the handover procedure will be started after the inspection and acceptance of various aspects is completed.

On May 5, 2021, the Secretary for Security of the Macao Special Administrative Region, Wong Sio Chak, attended the Legislative Council group meeting and stated that the Qingmao Port is still waiting for the completion of the optical fiber laying equipment in Zhuhai. After that, joint adjustments and examinations of various degree will be carried out at the Qingmao Port. He believes clearance is available in the second half of the year.

On July 16, 2021, the Secretary for Security of the Macao Special Administrative Region, Wong Sio Chak, met with the media after attending public event. When answering reporters' questions, he said that the Qingmao Port project has been completed and is expected to open in the second half of the year. The specific time is being negotiated intensively with Guangdong, and believe that good news will be announced in the near future. He said that the self-service customs clearance equipment at the Qingmao Port has completed the first stress test with very ideal results. The second stress test will be conducted in late July, and a fire drill will be carried out in early August.

On August 3, 2021, due to the outbreak of the "family group" infection with the Delta variant in Macau, the Government of the Macao Special Administrative Region announced entering immediate civil defense prevention state. The fire drill originally scheduled for August 4 was postponed, and the opening date of the port was predicted to be further delayed, so the fire drill was postponed to August 26 of that year.

On August 17, 2021, the Zhuhai part of Qingmao Port is undergoing final construction, and the pedestrian bridge between the Australian Port and Bairro da Ilha Verde has been opened for use. According to sources, it will open in early September.

On August 30, 2021, the Government of the Macao Special Administrative Region and the People's Government of Guangdong Province respectively announced that, according to the approval of the State Council and after consultation between the governments of Guangdong and Macao, the Qingmao Port (Channel in Guangdong and Macau) opens on the afternoon of September 8, 2021. It was officially opened at 3 o'clock.

On September 6, 2021, an executive order was published in the Official Gazette of the Macao Special Administrative Region, announcing the establishment of the Qingmao Immigration Affairs Station in the Macao Border Inspection Building at the Qingmao Port. On the same day, the Macao Special Administrative Region Government published the "Regulations on the Use and Operation of the Qingmao Port Parking Lot", announcing that the first basement floor would be a public parking lot and the second basement floor would be a dedicated parking lot. The public parking lot on the first basement floor has a total of 365 public parking spaces, including 158 spaces for light passenger vehicles and 207 spaces for motorcycles. In terms of charges, private cars are charged at $8 hourly during the day and $6 hourly at night; motorcycles are charged at $3 hourly during the day and $2 hourly at night. It is also stipulated that when the Meteorological Bureau issues a Tropical Cyclone Warning Signal No. 8 or above and a Second Level Warning / Yellow or above, the Qingmao Port parking lot will be closed for the next 90 minutes. In addition, the Transport Bureau announced on the same day that the Qingmao Port parking lot would be officially opened at 2:30 pm on September 8.
