= Port of Jinzhou =

Seaport in the Bohai Sea, China

- Interactive map of Port of Jinzhou
- Location in China
- Native name: 锦州港

Location
- Location: China
- Coordinates: 40.8035°N 121.0549°E
- UN/LOCODE: CN JZI https://service.unece.org/trade/locode/cn.htm

Details
- Opened: October 1986; 39 years ago

The Port of Jinzhou is a seaport on the Bohai Sea in the vicinity of Jinzhou, Liaoning, People's Republic of China. It is mostly an artificial port built on reclaimed land. It was founded in October 1986 and declared a port-of-entry in December 1990. As it is the northernmost of the major Chinese seaports, and lies at the terminus of several connecting railways, it declares itself the most convenient access to northern China and the "main port of Mongolia".

It is mostly an artificial port built on reclaimed land. It has a dredged channel 17.8m deep capable of allowing ships up to 150,000DWT. In 2014 it had a throughput of 95,200,000 tonnes of cargo and 879,000 TEU of containers. It is in particular an active grain port, moving 11 million tonnes of grain in 2024.

== Layout ==
Berths

Number	Berth name	Type	Quayside (m)	Depth (m)	Berthing (DWT)	Annual Capacity (ton/yr)
1	101		356	14	120,000×1	4,150,000
2	102	Chemicals	241	11	30,000×1	2,075,000
3	103	Oil	217	11	20,000×1	1,600,000
4	104	Oil	190	11	20,000×1	1,600,000
5	105	Chemicals	152	10	10,000×1	1,000,000
6	106	Chemicals	230	12	30,000×1	2,075,000
7	107	General	130	7.5	3,000×1	150,000
8	201	General	262	12	20,000×1	1,600,000
9	202	Bulk	270	14	50,000×1	2,600,000
10	203	Bulk	340	15.4	70,000×1	3,500,000
11	204	Bulk	242	15.4	70,000×1	3,500,000
12	205	Bulk	311	16	100,000×1	7,200,000
13	206	Bulk	365	16	100,000×1	7,200,000
14	207		259	15.4	50000×1	
15	208		274	15.4	50000×1	
16	209		339	14.5	50000×1	
17	210		339	145	50000×1	
18	301	Oil	480	23	300,000×1	12,500,000
19	304	Bulk	248	16	100,000×1	7,200,000
20	305	Bulk	248	16	100,000×1	7,200,000
21	306	Bulk	248	16	100,000×1	7,200,000
	403	Coal				11,000,000
	404	Coal				11,000,000
	405	Coal				11,000,000
22	501	Oil	140	8.2	5,000×1	600,000
23	502		239	14.3	50,000×1	2000,000
24	Non-production		155	4.7		
25						
