= Taizhou Library =

Public library in Taizhou, Zhejiang, China

- 台州市图书馆
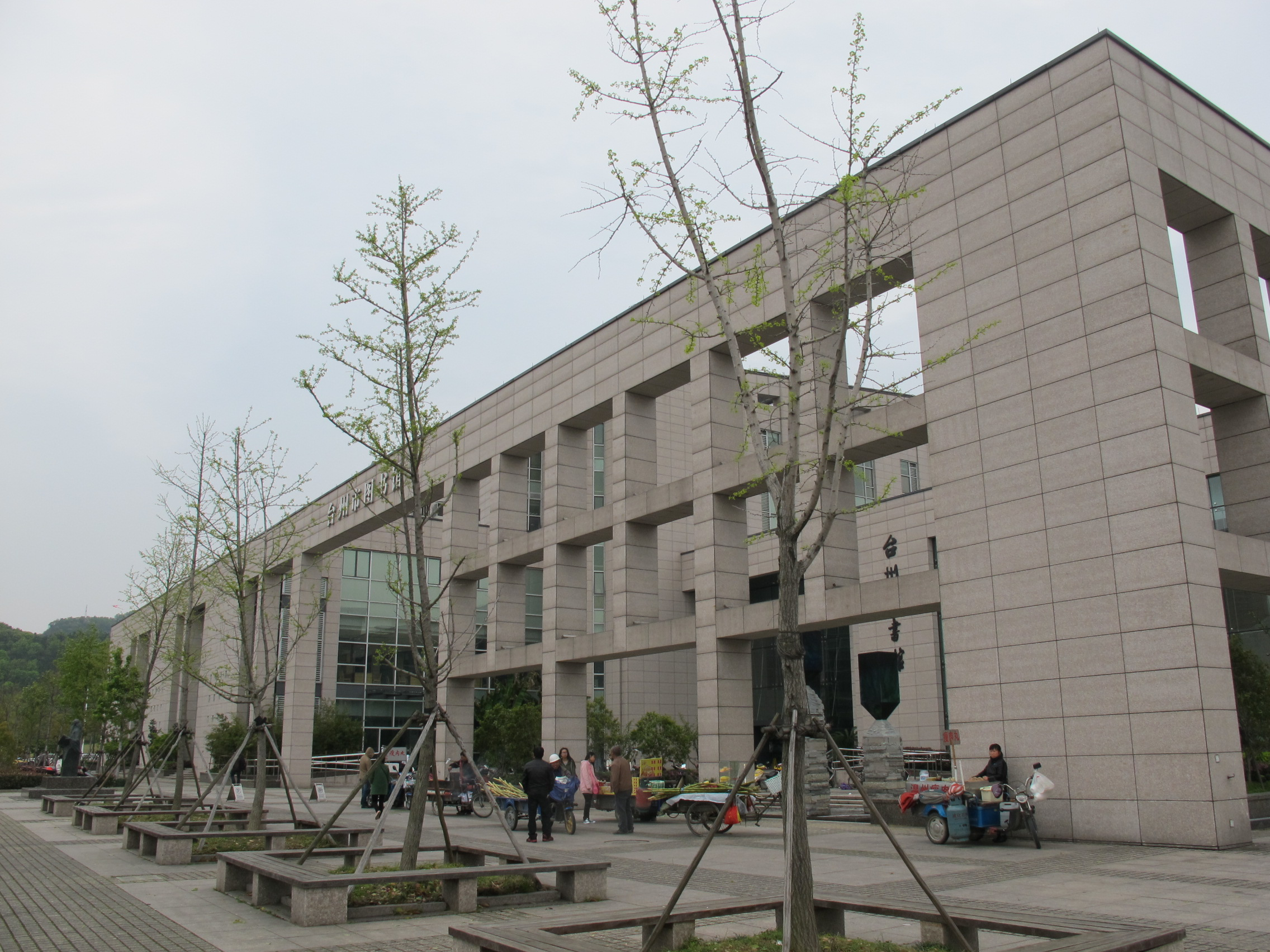
- Taizhou City Library
- 28.6611°N 121.4138°E
- Location: 168 Hexie St., Jiaojiang, Taizhou, Zhejiang, China
- Type: Public library
- Established: December, 2010
- Branch of: Bureau of Culture, Radio, Television, Tourism and Sports of Taizhou city

Collection
- Size: 876,774 volumes (as of 2019)

Access and use
- Circulation: 1,051,929 (2019)

Other information
- Website: www.tzlib.cn tzlib.info

The Taizhou City Library (in Chinese: 台州市图书馆), also known as Taizhou Library (台州图书馆), abbreviated as Tai Tu (台图), is a municipal-level public library located in Taizhou, Zhejiang, People's Republic of China. It is supervised by the Taizhou Municipal Bureau of Culture, Radio, Television, Tourism, and Sports, and is an affiliated unit of the latter. The library building is situated at 168 Hexie Road, Jiaojiang (Taizhou). As of 2019, the total collection of documents in the library reached 876,774 volumes, making it a nationally recognized first-grade library evaluated by the Ministry of Culture and Tourism.

The public library collection and reading rooms in Taizhou can be traced back to the Republican era. However, prior to the establishment of the Taizhou Library, Taizhou lacked a larger public library bearing the name "Taizhou City". The construction of the Taizhou City Library began in December 2006, and it opened to the public in December 2010. In 2019, the Taizhou City Library welcomed a total of 1.85 million visitors.

== History ==
=== Background ===
The history of public library collections in Taizhou can be traced back to the Republican era. In 1912 (the first year of the Republic of China), based on the establishment of the Mingshan Ge Bookstore in 1873, the Huangyan County Library (now the Huangyan District Library) was established, with a collection of over 100,000 volumes, most of which were ancient thread-bound books. Between 1918 and 1936, the Linhai County Library (now the Linhai City Library), the Wenling County Popular Library (now the Wenling City Library), and the Xianju County Public Library (formally established as the Xianju County Library in 1978) were established. The Tiantai County Library was also established during this period. The Yuhuan County Library (now the Yuhuan City Library) and the Sanmen County Library were founded in 1978 and 1979 respectively, both of which were originally local people's education centers. After 1983, libraries in various districts of Taizhou were successively built or expanded, accelerating the development of public library services. However, at this time, Taizhou and even the later established Taizhou city lacked a municipal-level public library.

=== Establishment and development ===
To counter that situation, in 2001, the preliminary plan for the construction of the Taizhou City Library was proposed. The plan aimed to establish a "composite library", which would integrate traditional and digital collections, with a tendency towards a digital-oriented library. Subsequently, experts drafted the "Feasibility Study Report on the New Building Project of the Taizhou City Library", and the design phase took place from April 2003 to May 2004. Construction of the Taizhou City Library commenced in December 2006, along with the initiation of the collection of library materials. The investment in this new library amounted to 130 million yuan, with a planned total construction area of over 20,000 square meters. Donations of books had already begun at the onset of construction, with over a hundred types of books donated by the Municipal Bureau of Culture, Radio, Television, News, and Publishing of Taizhou. On December 27, 2010, the Taizhou City Library was opened to the public.

In February 2013, the northeast corner of the Taizhou City Library was completed and opened as the Hehe Book Bar (a 24-hour self-service library), the first of its kind in Taizhou and the first large-scale self-service library integrating borrowing and collection in Zhejiang. On November 2, 2013, it was designated as a national first-grade library by the Ministry of Culture of the People's Republic of China. On December 30, it initiated a shared borrowing and returning service with three district libraries: Jiaojiang District Library, Huangyan District Library, and Luqiao District Library. On April 23, 2016, the Jinglong Mansion Hehe Book Bar was put into operation, becoming the first self-service library in China to adopt compatible RFID dual-frequency technology. In April, it became the Director Unit of the Professional Committee for Collection and Reading Promotion of the Chinese Library Association. On the morning of December 30, the Board of Directors of the Taizhou City Library was established.

== Library ==
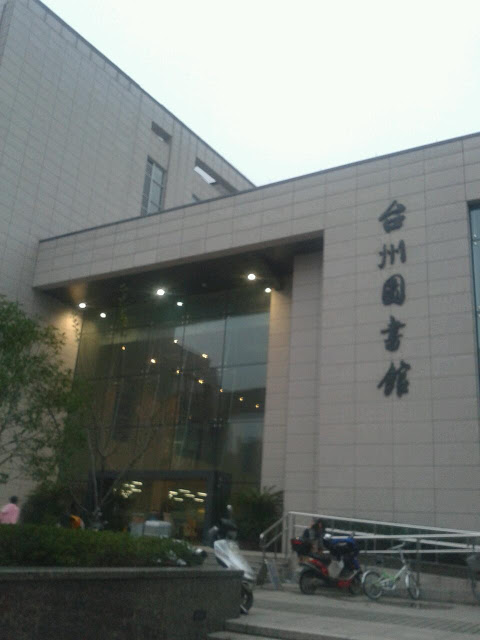
Exterior corner of Taizhou City Library

The Taizhou City Library is located at 168 Hexie Road, Jiaojiang District, situated on the west side of the municipal administrative building and the east side of the Civic Square. The total construction area is 21,000 square meters, with the main building exterior in gray, consisting of five above-ground floors and one underground floor, designed to accommodate 600,000 volumes. The design of the library was led by Professor Guan Zhaoye from the Chinese Academy of Engineering and the School of Architecture at Tsinghua University. The design team advocates for integrating the library with the Taizhou City Cultural and Art Center, Taizhou Museum, Taizhou Science and Technology Museum, and Taizhou Grand Theater, enclosing them into a whole, "harmoniously blending into the environment" to achieve visual balance, while adapting to the climate of the southern region, and emphasizing a "people-oriented" approach.

In terms of design, the style of each reading room is matched with the types of documents stored. The children's reading room is located by the staircase in the atrium on the first floor, with a slightly playful style. The parent-child library is the most distinctive reading room in the library, predominantly decorated in warm colors and designed with humanization in mind, featuring lovely patterns and low steps leading to the outdoors, where children can play on the lawn in the library's backyard. The ordinary literature reading room on the second floor is divided into Room One and Room Two, with Room One offering better sunlight and views. The local literature reading room on the fourth floor exudes classical charm.

Floors of the Taizhou City Library
5th floor	General audiovisual room		Conference room for readers		Laboratory for specialists	
4th floor	Reading room of regional literature					
3rd floor	Literary museum Ye Wenling			Library of the regional industry of Taizhou		
2nd floor	Reading room of general literature (divided into two rooms)					
1st floor	Information desk	Reading room for children	Library for parents and children	Accessible library	Reading room for newspaper and magazine	Hehe Book Bar
Basement	Exhibition hall of various schools		Museum of tax culture		Maker Space	

== Library affairs ==
=== Overview ===
(Taizhou City Library) is responsible for collecting and preserving various types of literature and information materials such as books, newspapers, audio-visual materials, databases, etc.; providing borrowing and inquiry services of literature and information materials for the people of the whole city; organizing various reading activities, carrying out social education, public welfare training, and disseminating scientific and cultural knowledge; undertaking the collection, sorting, development, and inheritance tasks of local literature in Taizhou; undertaking research on public libraries in the whole city and providing guidance and training for grassroots library businesses, and so on. Municipal Bureau of Culture, Radio, Television, Tourism, and Sports of Taizhou.

In 2019, the Taizhou City Library received a total of 1,851,450 readers (including 1.6064 million at the main library and the rest at the Hehe Book Bar); the cumulative number of library cards issued reached 170,767, including 28,025 new ones, and 147,793 valid cards. The library added 58,052 new documents throughout the year, bringing the total number of documents to 876,774; the number of books borrowed reached 1,051,929.

=== Book borrowing ===
Citizens of Taizhou can borrow books by presenting their citizen card at the library's information desk or by submitting a photo of their citizen card to the library's official WeChat account. Each citizen card allows borrowing one book or CD for 30 days. Residents and new residents of Taizhou can obtain a borrowing card by paying a 100 yuan deposit, which can be linked to their ID card for borrowing. Readers with a Sesame Credit score of 550 or above are exempt from this deposit. Initially, the borrowing limit was 4 items, now increased to 6 for a 30-day period. Readers who volunteer or participate in library activities may have their borrowing privileges upgraded. Renewals are available once, extending the loan period by 15 days. The library also offers reservation services, notifying readers when a reserved item becomes available for borrowing.

=== Services ===
Taizhou City Library has two reading rooms: the general literature reading room, which collects various reading materials (including a room for philosophy, social sciences, natural sciences, and comprehensive books, and a room specifically for literary works), and the children's reading room. Additionally, there are facilities such as the Parent-Child Library, the Regional Literature Reading Room, which collects local literary works in Taizhou, the Local Industry Library, which collects books and series database resources related to local industries in Taizhou, and the 24-Hour Self-Service Library (Hehe Books Bar), which collects general literature and is open 24 hours. Furthermore, there is an Accessible Library for disabled individuals, providing them and other readers access to digital resources and borrowing books. Additionally, the Ye Wenling Literature Hall is open for the collection (not lending) of books and manuscripts by the well-known Taizhou author Ye Wenling. The Parent-Child Library and Local Literature Reading Room in Taizhou City Library are considered relatively advanced among municipal public libraries in China.

=== Activities ===
In 2018, Taizhou City Library organized 810 reading activities, with a total participation of over 530,000 people. Every weekend, the library holds the "Taizhou Citizens' Lecture Hall," inviting experts to give professional lectures to citizens, such as the "Taizhou Humanities Lecture Hall" teaching cultural and historical knowledge and the "Popular Science Lecture Hall" spreading scientific knowledge. Additionally, there are activities such as the "Children's Book Corner," "Human Library", "Happy Book Corner", and "Library Night". Furthermore, the library allows and supports volunteer participation in services. In recognition of volunteers' services, Taizhou City Library has introduced reward measures, offering upgraded borrowing privileges and increased maximum borrowing quantities based on the duration of service.

=== Digital services ===
On July 4, 2012, Taizhou City Library launched its digital library service, also known as the "Library Unified Retrieval Service". At that time, readers with library cards could access four major databases through the website: authorized databases, self-built databases, provincial joint procurement databases, and trial databases. Taizhou City Library's self-built databases include the "View Taizhou Database" and the "Taizhou Local Chronicles Database". As of July 2019, there are seven self-built databases, including the division of the "View Taizhou Database" into articles and entire publications, and the addition of databases such as the "Taizhou City Library Ticket Database", "Taizhou Prefecture City Ancient Well Database", "Taizhou City Ancient Tree Database", and "Ye Wenling Literature Hall Database". Offline, the library has purchased e-book borrowing machines, allowing users to scan QR codes on the machines to download genuine e-books to their mobile phones. Additionally, if readers cannot find the book they want to borrow, they can search for it using computers in the reading room. After entering information such as the book title, if the library has the book, its specific information and location will be displayed to help readers find it. Wi-Fi networks are available throughout the library for reader use.

== Controversy ==
On April 23, 2014, World Book and Copyright Day, the "Taizhou Business News" revealed that despite the local registered population reaching 6 million, the number of library cards issued by Taizhou City Library was only 60,000, with 10,000 of them being "dormant", meaning they had not been used for some time. In response, Taizhou City Library launched the "Awaken Dormant Library Cards" campaign, hoping that the holders of these "dormant" library cards would come forward to "awaken" them. However, Ma Xu, the director of Taizhou City Library, argued that this comparison was not objective because Taizhou City Library is located in the urban area of Taizhou City, making it difficult for people from remote areas such as Wenling, Linhai, and Yuhuan to access it. In response to this phenomenon, apart from setting up "Hehe Books Bars" in various counties and urban areas, Taizhou City Library also introduced the "Mobile Library" service, which involves loading 2,000 books onto a minibus that travels to towns, villages, schools, military units, etc., from Tuesday to Saturday each week, providing book reading and borrowing services.

== See also ==
- Taizhou Museum
- Wenling Library
- List of libraries in China
