= List of Asian cities by population within city limits =

This is a list of the largest cities in Asia ranked according to population within their city limits. It deals exclusively with the areas within city administrative boundaries (municipalities) as opposed to urban areas or metropolitan areas, which are generally larger in terms of population than the main city.

The list includes cities geographically situated in Asia, using the conventional definition of its boundaries.

Please note that the compiled figures are not collected at the same time in every country, or at the same level of accuracy, therefore the ranking of the cities according to their population can be misleading.

== List ==
Bold represents largest city in country, Italic represents capital city.

City	Nation	Image	Population			
		Image	City proper	Metropolitan area	Urban area	Remarks
**Shanghai**	China		24,256,800	23,416,000 (Note: Bhutan, Hangzhou, Nanjing, Suzhou, Wuxi, Ningbo, Changzhou, Shaoxing, and urban area of Zhangjiaggang-Jiangyin within the prefecture-level cities of Suzhou and Wuxi are treated as separate urban areas which constitute the Yangtze River Delta economic zone. Huai'an (1,856,000; 148 km^{2}), Xuzhou (1,246,000; 233 km^{2}), Nantong (1,036,000; 233 km^{2}), Lianyungang (985,000; 155 km^{2}), Zhenjiang (983,000; 168 km^{2}), Yancheng (797,000; 207 km^{2}), Huzhou (690,000; 111 km^{2}), Taizhou (in Jiangsu Province; 300,000; 117 km^{2}) and Suqian (220,000; 36 km^{2}), as well as urban areas of Yangzhou (1,593,000; 233 km^{2}) and Gaoyou (180,000; 39 km^{2}) within the prefecture-level city of Yangzhou, urban areas of Kunshan (1,596,000; 492 km^{2}), Changshu (1,139,000; 285 km^{2}) and Taicang (523,000; 117 km^{2}) within the prefecture-level city of Suzhou, urban areas of Cixi (1,200,000; 298 km^{2}) and Yuyao (650,000; 122 km^{2}) within the sub-provincial city of Ningbo, urban areas of Jiaxing (1,044,000; 259 km^{2}) and Tongxiang (510,000; 52 km^{2}) within the prefecture-level city of Jiaxing, urban areas of Wenling (510,000; 52 km^{2}), Jiaojiang (375,000; 41 km^{2}) and Huangyan (200,000; 34 km^{2}) within the prefecture-level city of Taizhou (in Zhejiang Province), urban areas of Zhuji (500,000; 117 km^{2}) and Shangyu (400,000; 158 km^{2}) within the prefecture-level city of Shaoxing, urban areas of Yiwu-Dongyang (925,000; 233 km^{2}), Jinhua (520,000; 186 km^{2}), Yongkang (500,000; 223 km^{2}), Dongyang (260,000; 104 km^{2}) and Lanxi (220,000; 34 km^{2}) within the prefecture-level city of Jinhua, and urban area of Fuyang (450,000; 49 km^{2}) within the sub-provincial city of Hangzhou are also excluded.)	34,750,000	
Beijing	China		21,516,000	21,009,000	21,148,000	
**Karachi**	Pakistan		20,382,881 (2023)	25,400,000	25,400,000	
Guangzhou	China		18,676,605(2020)	44,259,000	20,800,654	
**Mumbai**	India		17,673,000 (2024)	18,414,288 (2011)	20,748,395 (2011)	Mumbai City Proper, Mumbai Metropolitan Area and Mumbai Urban Area are considered synonymous with the officially designated Mumbai City district, Mumbai Metropolitan Region and Mumbai Extended Urban Agglomeration.
Shenzhen	China		17,494,398(2020)	12,084,000	10,630,000	
Delhi	India		16,787,941 (2011)	22,200,000 (2011)	46,069,000 (2011)	Delhi City Proper, Delhi Metropolitan Area and Delhi Urban Area are assumed to be synonymous with the current designations of Delhi Capital Territory, Central National Capital Region and National Capital Region, respectively.
**Istanbul** (Note: Istanbul is a transcontinental city straddling Eurasia. The majority of its residents live in the commercial and historical centre on the European side, and about a third of its population lives in suburbs on the Asian side of the Bosphorus, see the Boundaries between the continents of Earth.)	Turkey (Note: Turkey is a transcontinental country located mainly on the Anatolian Peninsula in Western Asia, with a smaller portion on the Balkan Peninsula in Southeastern Europe, see the Boundaries between the continents of Earth.)		14,657,000	15,328,000	16,703,000	
**Tokyo**	Japan		13,513,734	37,843,000	36,923,000	
**Metro Manila**	Philippines		13,484,462	28,250,517	27,123,000	
Lahore	Pakistan		13,004,135(2023)	10,355,000		
**Bangkok**	Thailand		10,539,415	14,998,000	8,305,218	
**Dhaka**	Bangladesh		10,295,786			
Suzhou	China		10,650,501			
**Jakarta**	Indonesia		10,075,310	30,539,000	30,075,310	
**Seoul**	South Korea		10,010,784	12,700,000	25,520,000	
**Ho Chi Minh City**	Vietnam		8,993,082	21,281,639		
Bengaluru	India		8,443,675 (2011)	9,621,551 (2011)	11,695,110 (2011)	Bengaluru City Proper, Bengaluru Metropolitan Area and Bengaluru Urban Area are considered synonymous with Bruhat Bengaluru Mahanagara Palike (Municipal Corporation), Bengaluru Urban district (comprising five taluks: Bangalore North (Bengaluru), Bangalore South (Kengeri), Bangalore East (Krishnaraja Pura), Yelahanka and Anekal) and Bengaluru Metropolitan Region (combination of Bengaluru Urban District, Bengaluru Rural District and Ramanagara district), respectively.
Dongguan	China		8,220,207			
Chongqing	China		8,189,800 (Note: Sum of the 2014 population estimates for the "urban-function core district" and "urban-function extended district" of Chongqing, which were 3,677,600 and 4,512,200 respectively. See also the next note.)	18,384,100		
Nanjing	China		8,187,828			
**Tehran**	Iran		8,154,051	13,532,000	14,595,904	
Shenyang	China		8,106,171			
Hanoi	Vietnam		8,053,663	17,067,480		
Hong Kong	Hong Kong SAR		7,298,600		7,331,699	
Baghdad	Iraq		7,180,889			
Chennai	India		4,646,732 (2011)	8,696,010 (2011)	8,917,749 (2011)	Chennai City Proper, Chennai Metropolitan Area and Chennai Urban Area are considered synonymous with the officially designated Chennai City district, Chennai Urban Agglomeration and Chennai Extended Urban Agglomeration.
Changsha	China		7,044,118			
Wuhan	China		6,886,253			
Tianjin	China		6,859,779	10,920,000		
Hyderabad	India		6,809,970		7,749,334	
Faisalabad	Pakistan		6,480,765	3,675,000		
Foshan	China		6,151,622			
Zunyi	China		6,127,009			
Chittagong	Bangladesh		6,025,985	8,440,000		
**Riyadh**	Saudi Arabia		5,676,621			
Ahmedabad	India		5,570,585		6,352,254	
Singapore	Singapore		5,535,000			
Shantou	China		5,391,028			
Ankara	Turkey		5,271,000	4,585,000	4,919,000	
Yangon	Myanmar		5,214,000			
Chengdu	China		4,741,929	10,376,000		
Kolkata	India		4,486,679	14,667,000	14,617,882	
Xi'an	China		4,467,837			
Surat	India		4,462,002			
Vadodara	India		4,280,701			
İzmir	Turkey		4,168,000	3,019,000	3,575,000	
Zhengzhou	China		4,122,087			
**New Taipei City**	Taiwan		4,000,164			
Yokohama	Japan		3,726,167			
Hangzhou	China		3,560,391			
Xiamen	China		3,531,347			
Quanzhou	China		3,520,846			
Busan	South Korea		3,510,833			
Rawalpindi	Pakistan		3,510,000			
Jeddah	Saudi Arabia		3,456,259			
Hyderabad	Pakistan		3,429,471			
Kabul	Afghanistan		3,414,100			
Hefei	China		3,352,076			
**Pyongyang**	North Korea		3,255,388			
Peshawar	Pakistan		3,201,000			
Cebu	Philippines		3,164,337	3,325,385		
Zhongshan	China		3,121,275			
Pune	India		3,115,431			
Jaipur	India		3,073,350			
Lucknow	India		3,001,475		6,500,000	
Wenzhou	China		3,039,439			
Incheon	South Korea		2,978,367			
Quezon City	Philippines		2,936,116 (Note: Quezon City and Caloocan are both under the administration of Metropolitan Manila)			
Taichung	Taiwan		2,809,004			
Kaohsiung	Taiwan		2,773,229			
Surabaya	Indonesia		2,765,487	7,302,283		
Taipei	Taiwan		2,704,974		7,045,488	
Osaka	Japan		2,691,742	19,341,976	17,444,000	
**Dubai**	United Arab Emirates		2,643,410			
Bandung	Indonesia		2,575,478	6,965,655		
Daegu	South Korea		2,492,994			
Nagpur	India		2,405,665	2,497,870		
Almaty	Kazakhstan (Note: Kazakhstan is a transcontinental country located mainly in Central Asia, with the most western parts of it in Eastern Europe, see the Boundaries between the continents of Earth.)		2,341,900	3,000,000		
Nagoya	Japan		2,296,014	9,107,414	10,177,000	
**Baku**	Azerbaijan (Note: Azerbaijan is a transcontinental country located in the Caucasus, at the crossroads of Eastern Europe and Western Asia, see the Boundaries between the continents of Earth.)		2,269,700			
**Phnom Penh**	Cambodia		2,234,566			
Kochi	India		2,232,456	4,221,140		
Taoyuan	Taiwan		2,230,653			
Medan	Indonesia		2,097,610	4,103,696		
**Kuala Lumpur**	Malaysia		1,982,112		8,455,029	
Sapporo	Japan		1,918,096	2,584,880		
Tainan	Taiwan		1,883,078			
Astana	Kazakhstan		1,642,738	1,650,000		
Davao City	Philippines		1,632,991	2,516,216 (Note: Davao City and its neighbouring cities and towns are all under part of Metropolitan Davao.)		
Novosibirsk	Russia (Note: Russia is a transcontinental country located in Eastern Europe and Northern Asia, but is considered European historically, culturally, ethnically, and politically, and the vast majority of its population (78%) lives in the European part of the country, see the Boundaries between the continents of Earth.)		1,612,833			
Caloocan	Philippines		1,583,978 (Note: Quezon City and Caloocan are both under the administration of Metropolitan Manila)			
Kobe	Japan		1,536,499 (Note: Kyoto and Kobe are both part of the Keihanshin, centered on Osaka.)			
Yekaterinburg	Russia		1,501,652			
Khulna	Bangladesh		1,500,689			
Fukuoka	Japan		1,483,052	5,590,378		
Kyoto	Japan		1,474,570 (Note: Kyoto and Kobe are both part of the Keihanshin, centered on Osaka.)			
Kawasaki	Japan		1,437,266			
Shymkent	Kazakhstan		1,274,296	1,800,000		
Omsk	Russia		1,154,116			
Ranchi	India		1,126,741			
Chelyabinsk	Russia		1,202,371			
Krasnoyarsk	Russia		1,090,811			
**Tbilisi**	Georgia (Note: Georgia is a transcontinental country located in the Caucasus, at the crossroads of Eastern Europe and Western Asia, see the Boundaries between the continents of Earth.)		1,178,100	1,485,293		
**Yerevan**	Armenia		1,081,800	1,420,000		

== See also ==
- List of metropolitan areas in Asia
