= Wenqiao =

Wenqiao Town 温峤镇
- Town
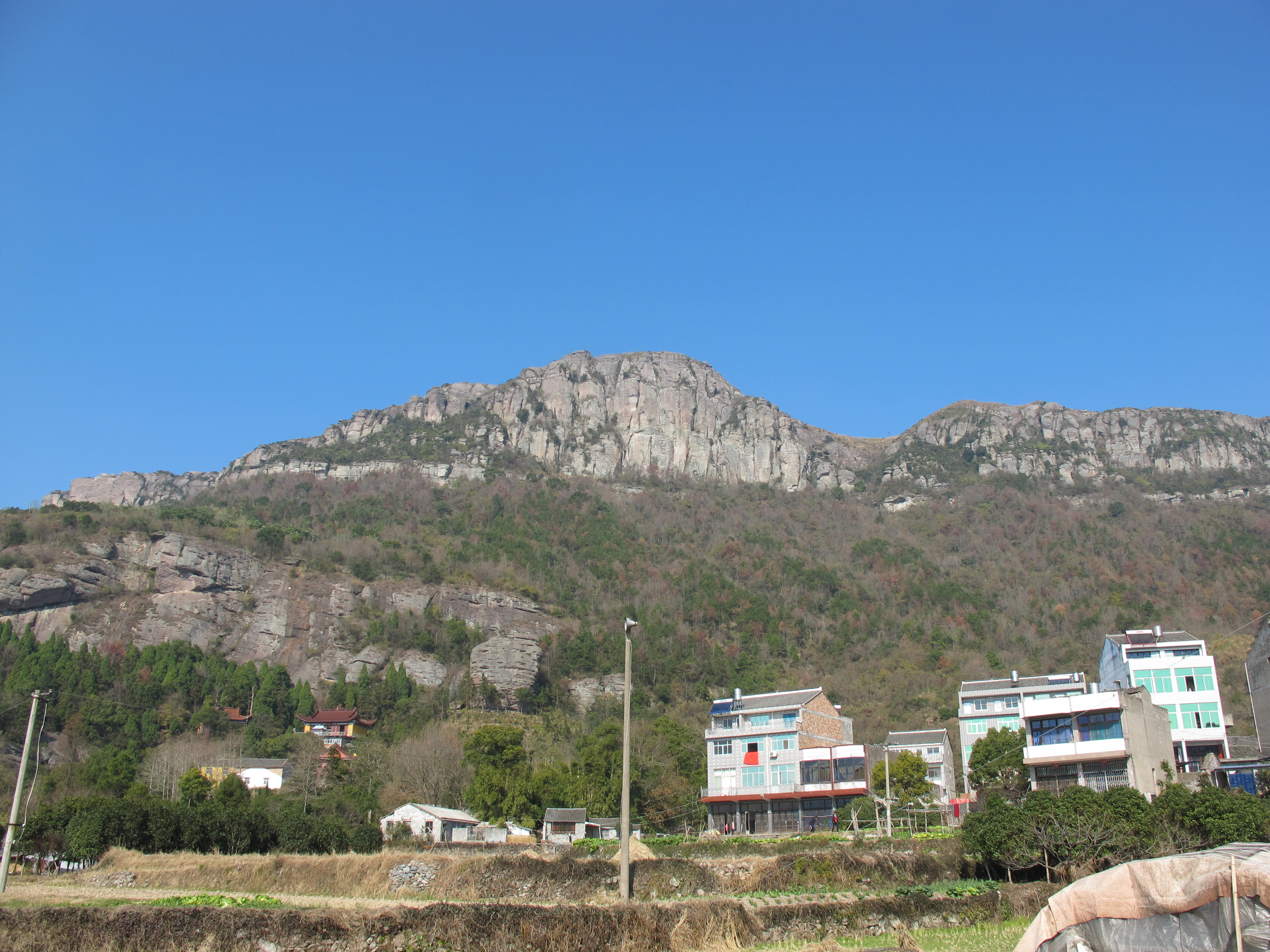
- Shangbao Mountain in 2013

- Location within Zhejiang Location within China
- Coordinates: 28.3829061°N 121.3018627°E
- Country: China
- Province: Zhejiang
- Prefecture-level city: Taizhou
- County-level city: Wenling
- Village-level divisions: 4 communities 45 villages

Area
  - Total: 78.8 km^{2} (30.4 sq mi)

Population (2020)
  - Total: 72,453
  - Density: 919/km^{2} (2,380/sq mi)
- Time zone: UTC+8 (China Standard)
- Postal code: 317527
- Area code: 0576

Wenqiao Town (simplified Chinese: 温峤镇; traditional Chinese: 溫嶠鎮; pinyin: Wēnqiáo Zhèn; lit. 'Warm ridge town'), formerly called Wenling Street, is a town under the jurisdiction of Wenling City, Taizhou, Zhejiang, China. Located in the south western part of Wenling, Wenqiao borders Chengdong Subdistrict to the east and faces the Yueqing Bay to the west. Its terrain is predominantly mountainous and hilly, with some coastal areas. The town covers an area of 78.8 km^{2} (30.4 sq mi) and administers 45 villages and 4 residential communities. It has a long history, with its establishment dating back to the Jin dynasty.

== History ==
Wenqiao Ridge, now known as Jiangsha Ridge, lies to the south west of the town and historically marked the boundary between Wenzhou and Taizhou. Fangyu Shenglan describes the area as "usually warm with little cold", hence the name Wenling (literally, "Warm Ridge").

Wenqiao was a key thoroughfare between Wenzhou and Taizhou in earlier times, and Wenqiao Ridge stands to the west of the southern entrance of Wenling Street. According to local gazetteers, its administrative establishment can be traced back to the Jin dynasty. During the Tang dynasty it was called Haiqiao; in the Northern Song it was known as Qiaoling Town; and during the Yuan, Ming and Qing periods it was referred to as Wenqiaoling Street.

In 1914, Taiping County was renamed Wenling County, adopting an alternative name of Wenqiao Ridge within its territory, because the name "Taiping County" duplicated the names of counties in Shanxi, Sichuan, Anhui and other provinces. In 1930, the town of Wenqiaoling Street was renamed Wenling Town and in 1951, it adopted its current name Wenqiao Town.

In 2006, Wenqiao Town was designated a Zhejiang Provincial Historic and Cultural Town, noted for the extensive, well preserved contiguous clusters of traditional shops and residences on Wenling Street dating from the Qing dynasty through the Republican period. In 2021, it was further included in Zhejiang Province's "Millennium Ancient Towns" place name cultural heritage list.

== Economy ==
Wenqiao's traditional industries are primarily centred on the manufacture and distribution of tools and cutting implements. Among large scale industrial enterprises, the footwear and tool sectors together account for nearly 60 per cent of total industrial output value. In 2023, the town had more than 1,600 enterprises engaged in the production and sale of tools. It is home to China's largest specialised market for measuring tools and cutting implements, 14 large-scale enterprises, 3 specialised industrial parks for tool and cutting implement manufacturing, and five technology transfer centres involving nine universities, including Tsinghua University, Sichuan University, Tianjin University and Shanghai University. Wenqiao is regarded as an important node in the global cutting tool industrial chain.

In agriculture, certain local speciality products enjoy recognition in regional markets, including free range chicken and loquat. Within Wenqiao lies the Wenling Old Street, which is listed under provincial level historical and cultural heritage protection, and the area contains ancient trees and other natural and cultural resources. The town is also home to ecological attractions such as the provincial Jiangxia Forest Park.

== Politics ==
Wenqiao is recognised as the place of origin of "participatory budgeting" in China. Its town government was among the earliest local governments in the country to conduct democratic consultation prior to the drafting of fiscal budgets. In 1999, the government of Songmen Town in Wenling established a forum on agricultural and rural modernisation, allowing members of the public to participate voluntarily and speak freely. The initiative proved highly popular and was subsequently promoted across townships in Wenling under the name "democratic consultation" by the municipal government. In 2003, the Wenqiao Town People's Congress adopted a resolution to formally incorporate democratic consultation into the institutional framework of the People's Congress system. This marked the first time that the subjects, participants, scope, procedures, voting mechanisms within the People's Congress, implementation, and supervision of democratic consultation were systematically regulated. In 2004, the Wenling Municipal Committee of the Communist Party stipulated that township level government decisions must undergo democratic consultation and incorporated the practice into the official performance evaluation system, linking it to the bonuses of township officials.

Under local regulations, prior to formulating the government budget, opinions are first widely solicited from villages and residential communities through consultation meetings, questionnaires and other means. The government then refines the annual budget proposal on this basis. Subsequently, around several thematic areas, representative members of the public and relevant government departments conduct pre meeting investigations and group consultations. Public representatives put forward proposed amendments, and the government revises the draft accordingly. Finally, within the framework of the People's Congress, the Budget Review Committee and deputies examine the draft and proposed revisions, formulate modification opinions, and adopt the final version by vote.

== Transport ==
- Hangzhou–Taizhou railway: Wenlingxi Station
