= Taizhou Museum =

City museum in Taizhou, Zhejiang, China

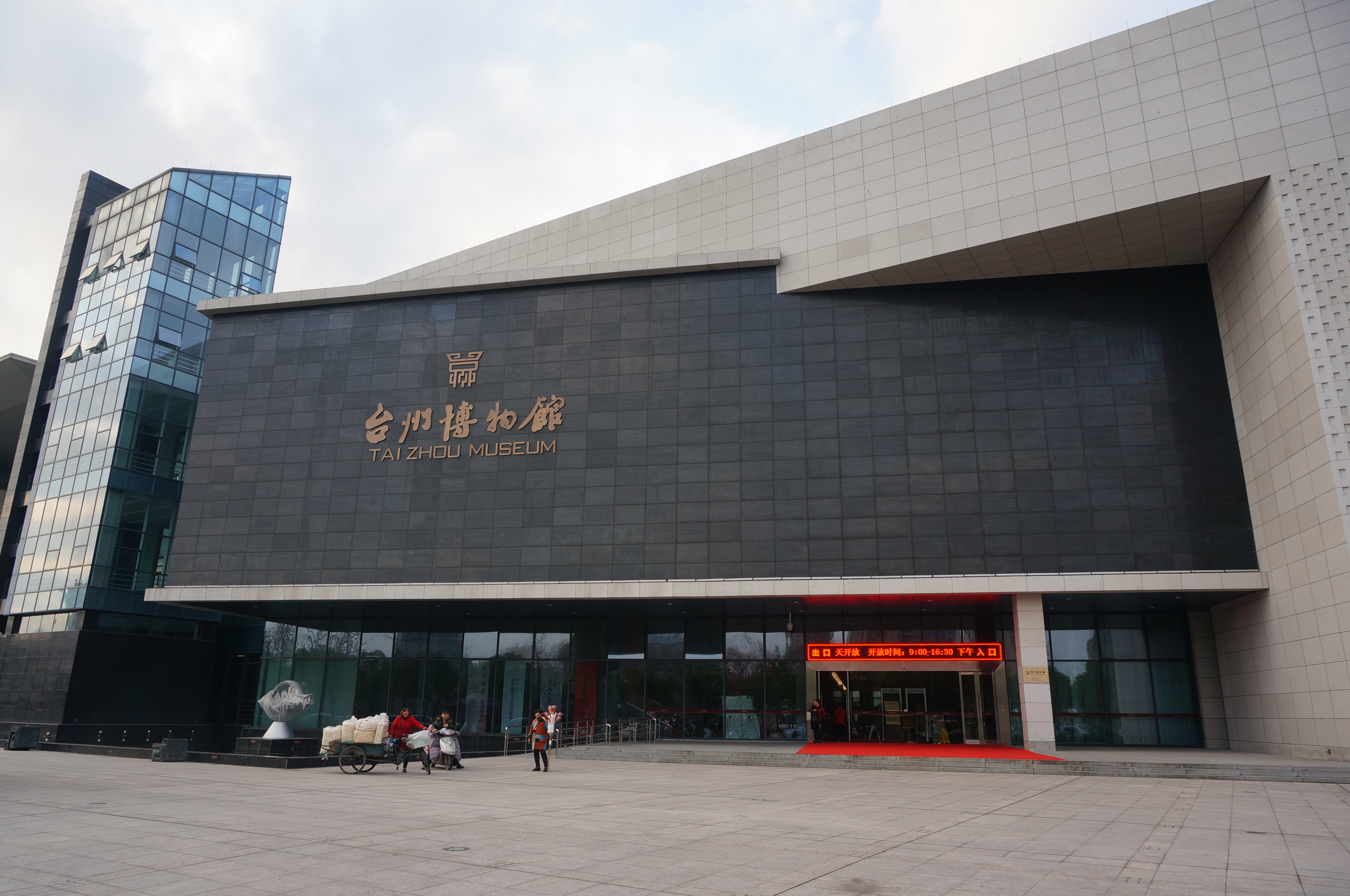
- Established: July 1, 2016
- Location: ChinaZhejiang Province, Taizhou City, Jiaojiang District, Aihua Road 168.
- Coordinates: 28.66318°N 121.41195°E
- Type: Prefecture-level comprehensive museum
- Collection size: 2,000 pieces (September, 2017)
- Director: Lao Yuhong
- Website: www.taizhoumuseum.com

The Taizhou Museum (in Chinese: 台州博物馆), also known as Taizhou City Museum, abbreviated as Tai Bo, is a comprehensive municipal museum in Taizhou City, Zhejiang Province, China. It had a trial opening on July 1, 2016, and officially opened on July 12. The museum is located at 168 Aihua Road, Jiaojiang District, Taizhou City, and is divided into four levels. The permanent exhibitions include 'Shanhun Haipo' (山魂海魄) showcasing Taizhou's historical and cultural heritage, and 'Dadi Qinghuai' (大地情怀) focusing on Taizhou's folk culture.

Prior to the opening of the Taizhou Museum, other prefecture-level cities in Zhejiang Province had already established comprehensive municipal museums, and various counties and districts in Taizhou had also established county-level museums. This led to a lack of collections at the Taizhou Museum. In this context, the Taizhou Museum chose to emphasize the "narration of stories".

== History ==
=== Context ===
In the late 1980s, museum construction in the Taizhou region began to gradually develop. By the end of 2006, there were state-owned museums and memorial halls, including the Qijiguang Memorial Hall in Jiaojiang, Linhai Museum, Huangyan Museum, Sanmen Museum, Chen Shuliang Calligraphy and Painting Gallery in Huangyan, Sanmen Uprising Memorial Hall, Tiantai Museum, and Linhai Ancient City Museum. However, at that time, Taizhou did not have a city-level comprehensive museum officially named "Taizhou City Museum". Taizhou Museum filled the gap that existed in Taizhou since it became a prefecture-level city without a city-level comprehensive museum. After other prefecture-level cities in Zhejiang Province had established and opened comprehensive museums, Taizhou Museum became the last city-level comprehensive museum to be established in the province.

=== Process of construction ===
The construction project for Taizhou Museum was put on the agenda in 2004, and in December 2009, the project officially began construction. Just two days after the opening of the Taizhou City Library on December 29, 2010, the Taizhou City Organization and Staffing Committee issued a document titled "Approval for the Establishment of Taizhou City Museum and Other Matters", officially approving the establishment of Taizhou Museum. In 2012, the text planning for the exhibition content was finalized, and in 2013, the formal design of the spatial layout was completed. A leadership group for the construction of the Taizhou Museum exhibition layout project was established, and expert group meetings were held for public space design, exhibition form design, and a design scheme review meeting was held in Hangzhou.

The collection of works began in 2014, with some of the collected items coming from social donations and others acquired through doorstep collection or purchase. On May 24, 2015, Taizhou Museum published the Collection Method in the "Taizhou Daily". Before this, on September 19, 2011, the Taizhou Antique Dealers Association had already donated over 260 cultural relics to Taizhou Museum. In order to properly store the collections while the museum building was not yet complete, the staff transformed their office into a storage room for cultural relics and borrowed storage space from the Huangyan Museum. The Taizhou Municipal People's Government Office led a coordination meeting for the loan of exhibits on October 14, 2014, to facilitate the cultural relic work.

On January 15, 2015, the Taizhou Development and Reform Commission approved the preliminary design review for the exhibition and informatization project of Taizhou Museum. On June 3, 2016, the security project passed the acceptance inspection by the Zhejiang Provincial Cultural Relics Bureau. On July 1, Taizhou Museum had a trial opening, and in less than two weeks, it received nearly 20,000 visitors. On July 12, Taizhou Museum officially opened.

== Museum infraestructure ==
The Taizhou Museum building is located at 168 Aihua Road, Jiaojiang District, Taizhou City. It has a floor area of 12,500 square meters, with a total exhibition area of about 6,000 square meters, and the venue is divided into four floors. The design of the Taizhou Museum building was led by the chief architect Hu Shaoxue, from Tsinghua University's Architectural Design and Research Institute. The layout of the museum was designed by a team led by Professor Yan Jianqiang of Zhejiang University's Department of Cultural Relics and Museology, with further input from various local experts in Taizhou. The multi-sensory aspects were designed by Zheng Kaichen and Liu Junzhu from Hangzhou Obsidian Exhibition Design Co., Ltd.

Distribution of the museum
1st floor	Temporary Exhibition Hall	
2nd floor	Exhibition Hall: "Mountains and Sea Spirits", History and Culture of Taizhou	
3rd floor	Exhibition Hall: "Feelings of the Earth", Folk Customs of Taizhou	
4th floor	Special Exhibition Hall: Folk collection	Storage room of Cultural Relics

== Exhibitions ==
=== Overview ===
Traditional museums primarily showcase works, but these works are not just standalone items of appreciation; they serve as evidence to authenticate stories. What's essential is to distill themes and storylines from a physical perspective, making the museum experience like listening to an accurate and vivid story. Only when a story is told brilliantly, clearly, and smoothly, the audience will find it enjoyable. Professor Yan Jianqiang, Director of the Cultural Relics and Museum Studies Department at Zhejiang University

The museum employs a combination of physical items, scenes, and text, along with the use of technological methods to recreate important scenes. Inside the museum, there are scene displays integrated with physical objects and murals, as well as light and shadow projection films. The museum is divided into four floors. The first floor features a temporary exhibition hall that periodically hosts high-quality special exhibitions from both domestic and international sources. The second floor's "Mountains and Sea Spirits" hall narrates the long history of Taizhou. The third floor's "Feelings of the Earth" hall showcases Taizhou's folk culture. The fourth floor houses a folk collection special exhibition hall. "Mountains and Sea Spirits" and "Feelings of the Earth" are the two main permanent exhibitions of the museum. The first floor's temporary exhibition hall and the fourth floor's folk collection special exhibition hall host exhibitions periodically.

Due to historical reasons, Taizhou City Museum lacked collections. The design team chose to focus on the "narration of stories" as a way to showcase the history of Taizhou. As of September 2017, Taizhou Museum had more than 2,000 exhibited items in its collection.

=== "Mountains and Sea Spirits" Hall ===
The "Mountains and Sea Spirits" Taizhou Historical and Cultural Exhibition Hall is located on the second floor of Taizhou Museum and is divided into four sections: "Beside the Ling River", "Ancient Port of Zhang'an", "Tiantai County", and "Chengcheng Tide." The exhibition mainly consists of ceramics, ironware, and scene models, using these objects to narrate various aspects of Taizhou's history from the Neolithic Age to the Xinhai Revolution. The exhibition includes three significant collections related to Taizhou: a Neolithic human face pattern gray pottery roof tile from the Three Kingdoms period, a Western Han primitive porcelain gourd-shaped pot with wave patterns, and a copper military marshal seal from the Han dynasty. There are also exhibits like a Jin Dynasty green-glazed lion-shaped porcelain candlestick, an Eastern Han brown-glazed soul jar, and a Northern Song Shabu kiln blue-glazed peony-pattern porcelain wine pot. At the entrance corner of the museum, there is a glass display case introducing local agricultural products to help children become familiar with Taizhou's local production.

The first section, "Beside the Ling River", introduces the early development of civilization in the Taizhou region, from the uplands to the seashore along the Ling River. It showcases artifacts such as grinding stones, spinning and weaving tools, pottery, and the remains of sites like Duqiaolikeng, Lingshan, and Manshan Island. The section also presents a reenactment of the life of the ancient Yue people through the stone shed tombs on Manshan Island and rock paintings.

The second section, "Ancient Port of Zhang'an", displays the development of Taizhou from the Dong'ou State to the Six Dynasties period. During this historical period, Taizhou's administrative status underwent several changes. In this section, "Setting Sail from Zhang'an" uses a 2D-to-3D technique to recreate the story of the Three Kingdoms, where Sun Quan of Eastern Wu sent General Wei Wen and Zhuge Zhi to sail from Zhang'an Port to Yizhou (modern-day Taiwan). The section also discusses the literary scene and religious development in Taizhou during that time, as it became a significant location for Buddhism and Taoism.

The third section, "Tiantai County", introduces the development of Taizhou during the Sui, Tang, and Song dynasties. It covers officials like Luo Binwang and Shen Quanqi, religious and cultural aspects such as the Guoqing Temple on the Tiantai Mountain, the He-he Erxian, and the Tongbai Palace. It also covers the influence of figures like Jigong, Situo, and Zhang Boduan on Tiantai Buddhism. Inside the museum, miniature landscapes are displayed to showcase the technical characteristics of certain industries and their impact on Taizhou's economy.

The fourth section, "Chengcheng Tide", showcases Taizhou's political, cultural, and economic development during the Yuan, Ming, and Qing dynasties, emphasizing the tenacity of the people of Taizhou. The exhibition begins by transforming the death of Fang Xiaoru into a scene project. Then, it uses an immersive display method within a section of the old town of Potan in Xianju, combining display with scene reenactment to demonstrate the prosperity of Taizhou's economy and society after the lifting of the Ming Dynasty sea ban. The history of "Mountain and Sea Spirit" essentially concludes at the modern-day dock.

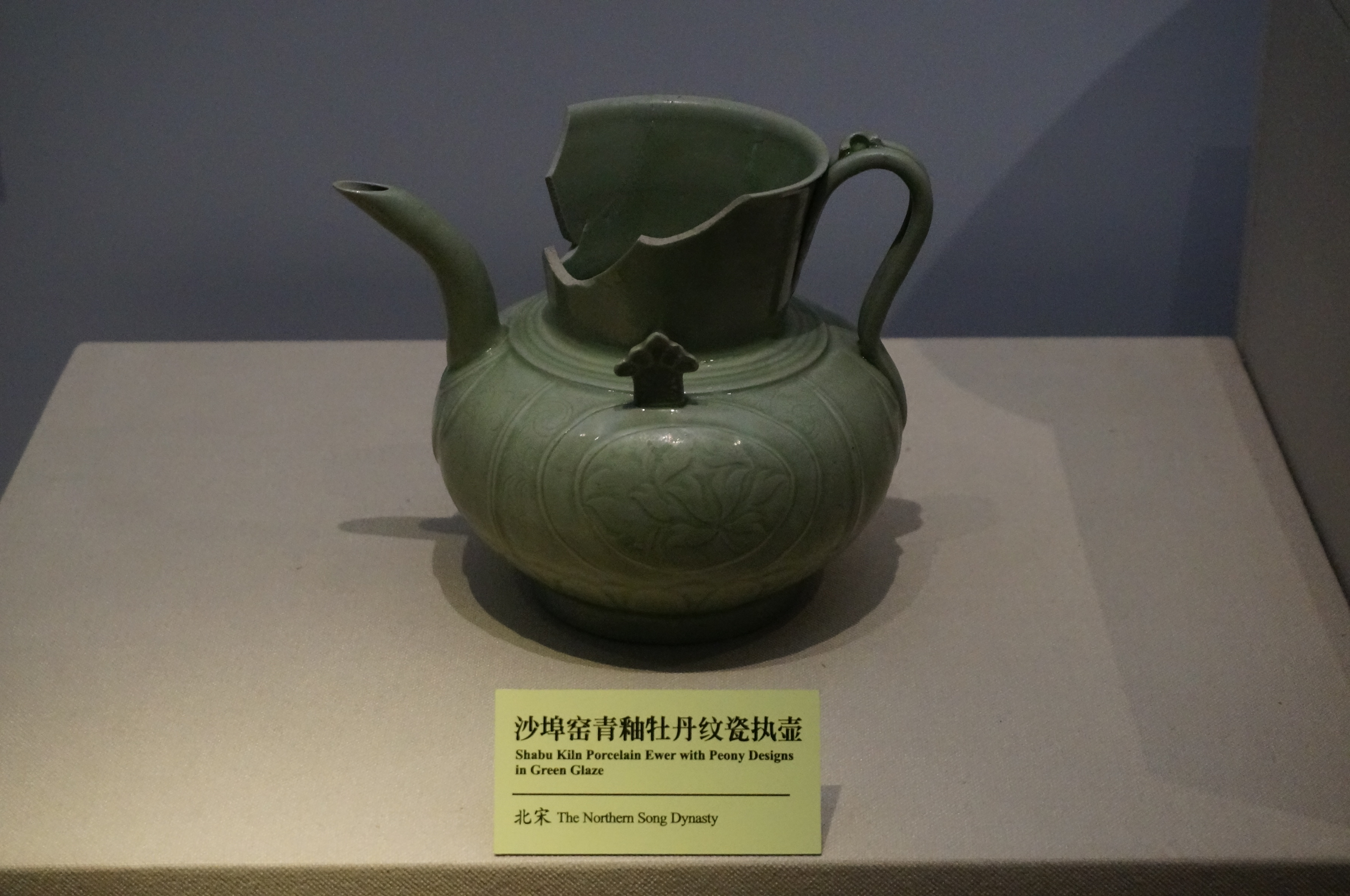
Sha Bu Kiln Green-Glazed Peony-Pattern Porcelain Wine Pot from Northern Song

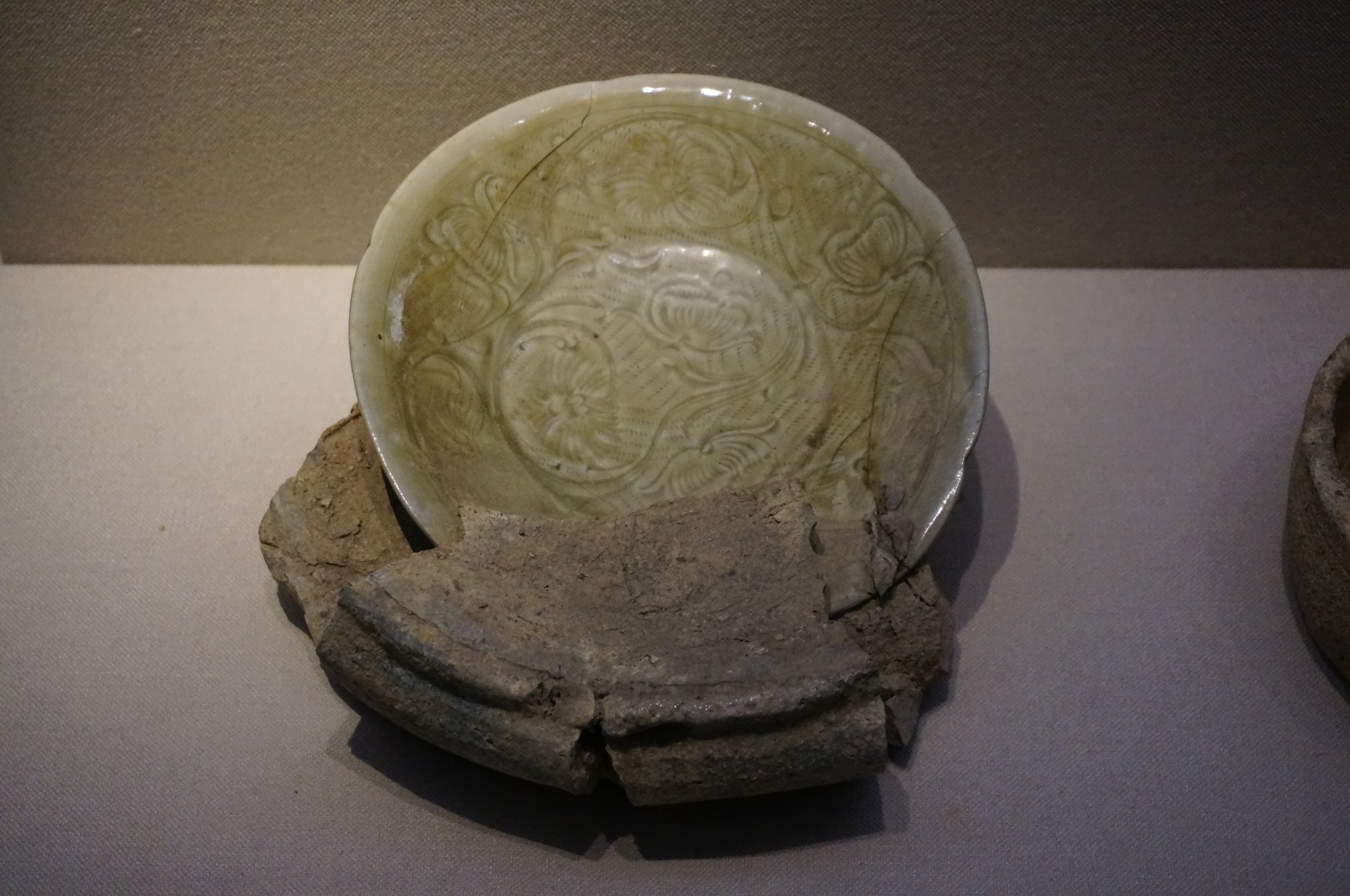
Sha Bu Kiln Green Porcelain Bowl and Covered Bowl from Northern Song

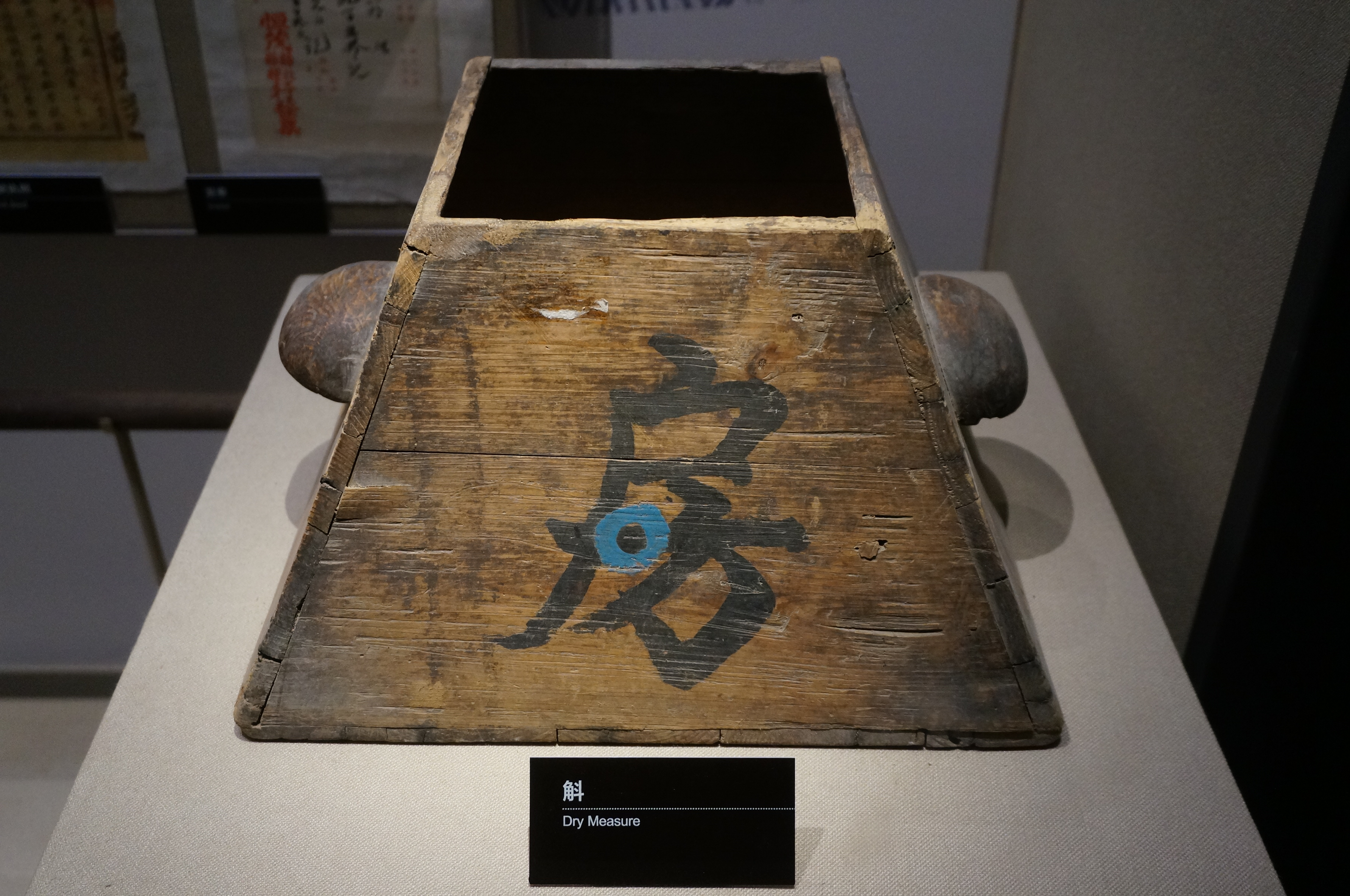
Dry measure.

=== "Feelings of the Earth" Hall ===
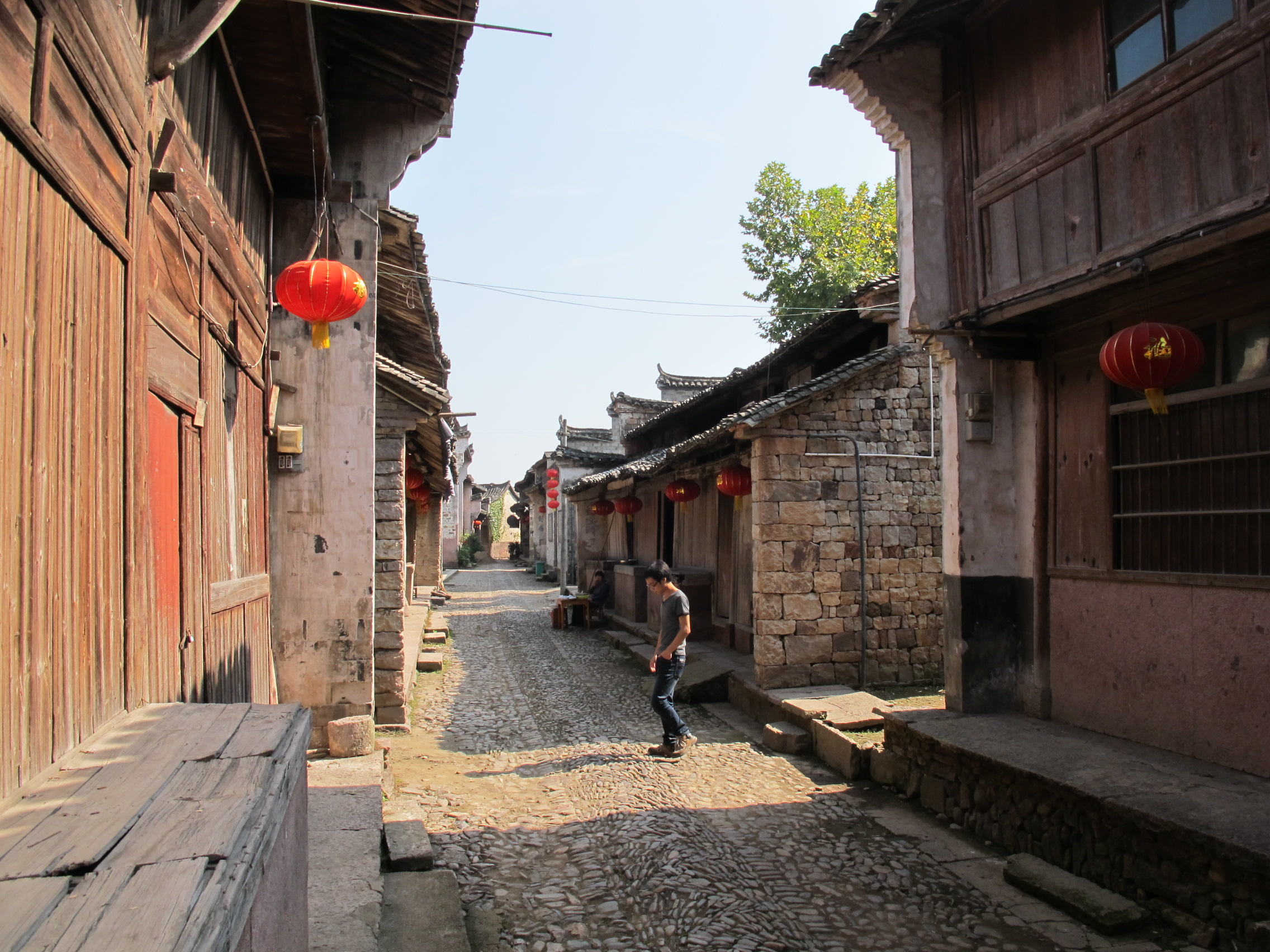
Xianju Potan Ancient Street, replicated at a reduced scale, is a part of the "Feelings of the Earth" Taizhou Folk Custom Exhibition located inside Taizhou Museum.

"Feelings of the Earth: A Taizhou Folk Custom Exhibition from the Perspective of Cultural Geography" is located on the third floor of Taizhou Museum and is divided into three sections: "People of the Mountains and Valleys", "People of the Wetlands", and "People of the Coast". The museum uses physical exhibits and scene reenactments to interpret various aspects of Taizhou's folk life through the cultural geography theory of Wang Shixing, a geographer from the Ming Dynasty. This exhibition tells the story of Taizhou's development and evolution from ancient times to the present. Wang Shixing once proposed that due to environmental differences, the people in hilly areas, plains, and coastal islands have different characters and customs. Since all three types of terrain are found in Taizhou, the region has developed various distinctive customs and traditions. The exhibition showcases intangible cultural heritage from various areas in Taizhou, scaled-down replicas of Mount Tiantai's Guoqing Temple and Long Street in Luqiao, and a one-to-one replica of the ancient town of Potan in Xianju created through three-dimensional scenes, providing a refreshing experience. This exhibition received the second prize in the 11th Zhejiang Museum Display and Exhibition Excellence Project in 2016.

The first section, "People of the Mountains and Valleys - Mountainous Regions and River Valleys", begins with the hilly river valleys of Tiantai. It uses scene reenactment to create the climate and landscapes of the mountainous hills and river valleys of Taizhou. Subsequently, it employs miniature models and physical displays with backboards to reflect the labor and craftsmanship of the mountain people in Taizhou. The exhibition also recreates a real residential house in Xianju.

The second section, "People of the Wetlands - Wenyuan Plain and Dutaopu Plain", begins with the plain rice fields in Huangyan. The exhibition concentrates on showcasing typical labor scenes, labor tools, and the results of labor in the plains, reflecting the working characteristics of the plain areas, emphasizing farming and trade, which differs from the production patterns shown in the other two sections. By combining the elements of the plain living environment, it presents the lifestyle of the people in the wetlands. The multimedia system then plays various festivals and ceremonies in places like Wenling and Huangyan.

The third section, "People of the Coast - Bays and Islands", delves into the life of fishermen in Sanmen Bay. With the chant of Jiaojiang shipbuilders, visitors are introduced to the fishing display where they can understand the life of fishermen on board and experience fishermen's work such as hoisting sails, tying knots, and steering through an interactive system. The exhibition also portrays the daily life scenes of coastal fishermen. To make the depiction more vivid, the exhibition uses an immersive environment to showcase the food, clothing, and art of Shitang Fishing Village in Wenling. Visitors can also learn about the customs and festivals in places like Wenling, Sanmen, and Yuhuan.

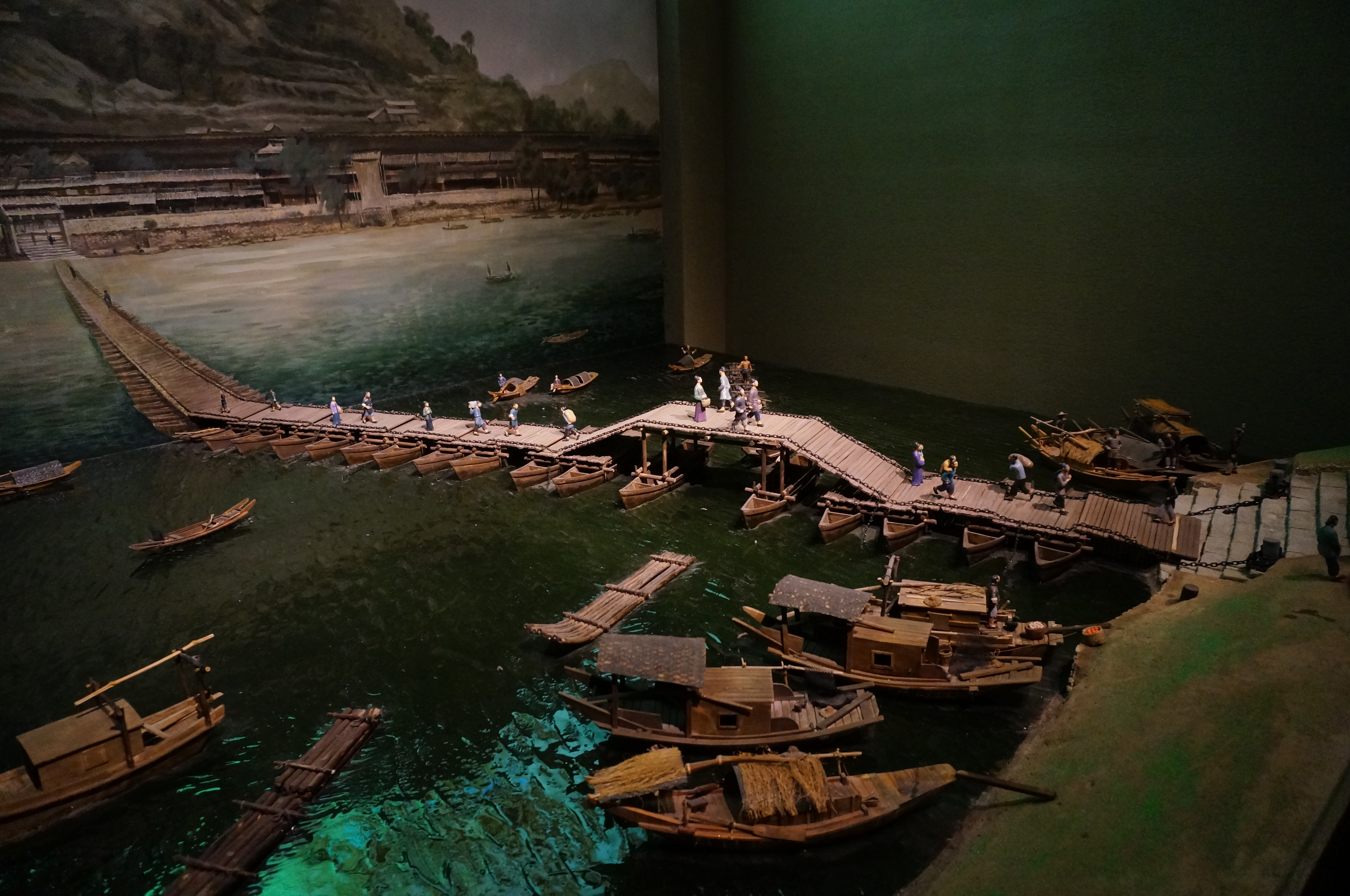
Linhai Zhongjin Floating Bridge Model

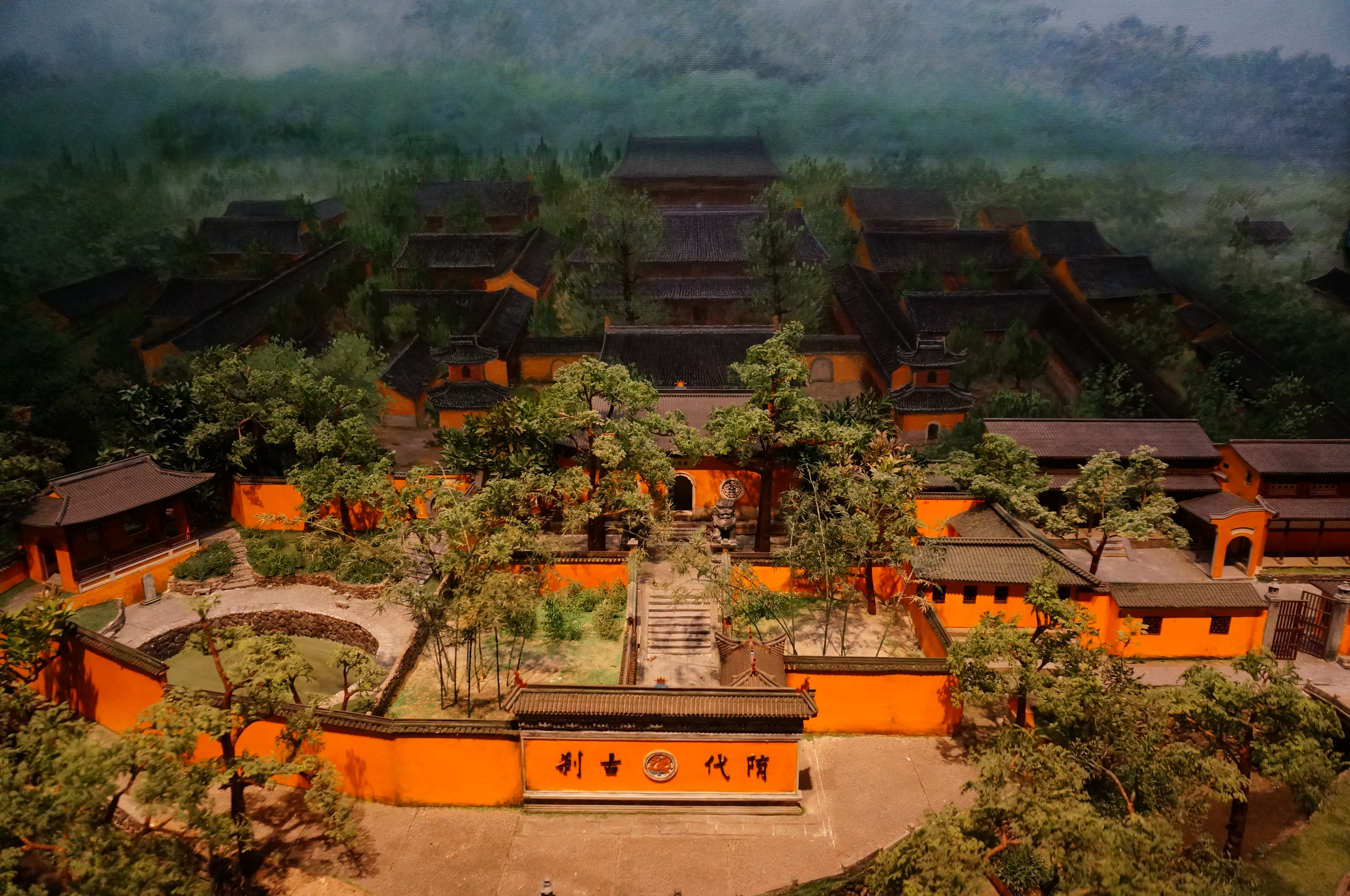
Mount Tiantai Guoqing Temple Model

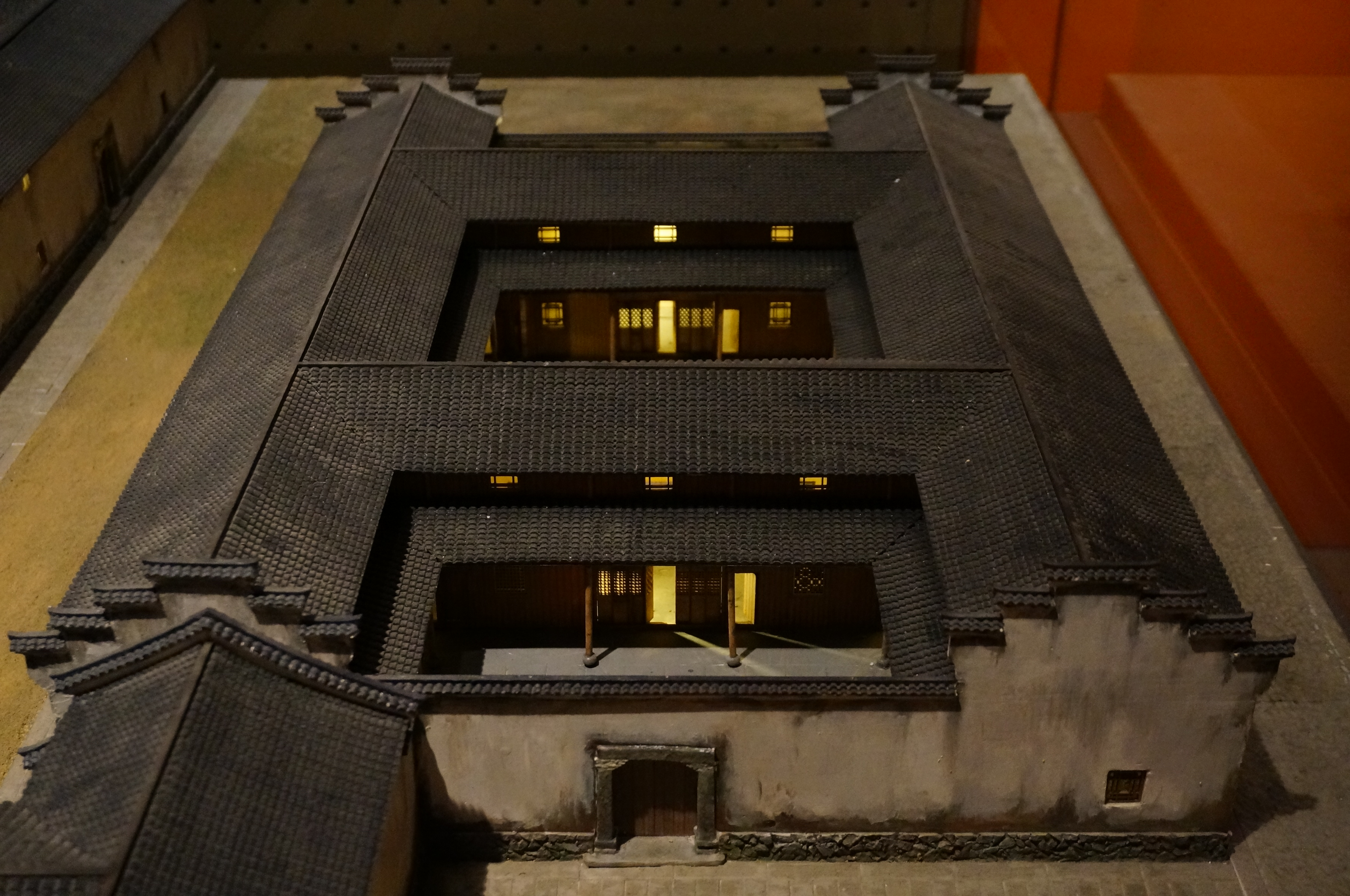
Xianju Potan Ancient Town Residential Model

== Management ==
=== Overview ===
"(Taizhou City Museum) collects, preserves, researches, and displays archaeological excavations, unearthed cultural relics, and various social dispersal artifacts, as well as art pieces from the entire city, continuously increasing the collection; protects, restores, and cleans various collected cultural relics, ensuring their sustainable use; plans or introduces various temporary exhibitions from both domestic and foreign sources, organizes various cultural activities in coordination with exhibitions to enhance the city's cultural standards; provides other services for visitors, including cultural resource materials, books, information, and more". Taizhou Municipal Bureau of Culture, Radio, Television, Tourism, and Sports

The Taizhou Museum is a non-profit public institution, fully funded. It is under the jurisdiction of the Taizhou Municipal Bureau of Culture, Radio, Television, Tourism, and Sports and is one of its subsidiary units. The museum's mission is to "remember hometown sentiments, preserve feelings, and make visiting Taizhou Museum a way of life". The current director of Taizhou Museum is Lao Yuhong, who has been working in the cultural heritage preservation field since 1992.

== See also ==
- Taizhou Library
- Xianju Library
- Archives of Yuhuan
