= Lin Xiling =

Chinese activist and dissident

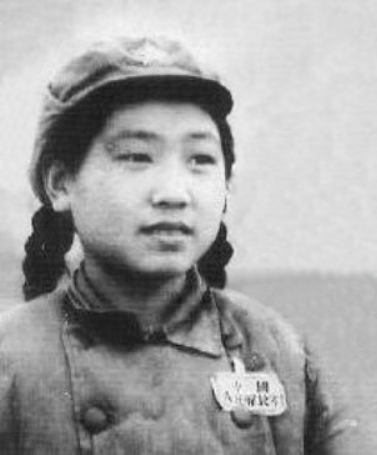
Lin Xiling

Lin Xiling (1935–2009), originally named Cheng Haiguo and born in Shanghai, was a Chinese activist and dissident. Her father was a linguist at Beijing University who later went to Taiwan. In 1949, Lin was enlisted in PLA as a secretary in Wenling, Zhejiang. In 1953, she went to Renmin University.

As a law student, Lin argued that all Chinese citizens should be allowed to criticize the government because "Chinese socialism was not real socialism". In 1957, she was one of the students demanding redress for Hu Feng, who had been arrested for criticizing the Chinese Communist Party's imposition of Marxist and Maoist ideas on writers. Her defense of Hu was a major factor in her subsequent persecution.
