= Ye Wenling =

Chinese novelist

- 叶文玲
- Born: November 4, 1942 (age 83); Chumen Town, Yuhuan, Zhejiang, China
- Education: Huangyan High School
- Occupation: Novelist
- Spouse: Wang Keqi (m. 1962)
- Writing career
- Language: Chinese
- Period: 1955–present
- Genres: Short story, novel
- Notable works: Xuemei and Me; Love Thy Neighbours; Snowing in The Chinese New Year's Eve
- Notable awards: National Excellent Short Story Award (1980); Chinese Culture Creation Outstanding Achievement Award (1995); Lu Xun Literary and Art Prize (1997)

Chinese name
- Traditional Chinese: 葉文玲
- Simplified Chinese: 叶文玲
Transcriptions
Standard Mandarin
- Hanyu Pinyin: Yè Wénlíng

Ye Wenling (Chinese: 叶文玲; born 4 November 1942) is a Chinese novelist. She was a member of the 6th, 7th and 8th National Committee of the Chinese People's Political Consultative Conference.

== Biography ==
Ye was born in Chumen Town, Yuhuan, Zhejiang, China in 1942. She has a brother, Ye Peng (叶鹏).

Ye published her first short stories A Couple of Things (夫妻间的小风波) and Seven Cents (七角钱) when she was 13 years old.

In 1957, Ye enrolled in the Huangyan High School (黄岩高中), but she dropped out when her brother Ye Peng was labeled as a rightist by the government. Later, Ye worked in kindergarten and factory in the day and wrote short stories at night. She published her short stories Xuemei and Me (我和雪梅), Love Thy Neighbours (两家亲) and Fenghuang A'jiao (凤凰阿娇) in East Sea (东海).

From 1966 to 1976, during the Cultural Revolution, Ye published her short story When The Monthly Plan Was Finished (当月计划完成的时候) in the Literature and Art Works (文艺作品选).

In 1977, Ye published her short stories Danmei (丹梅), Snowing in the Chinese New Year's Eve (飘雪的除夕) and The Chinese New Year's Eve Dinner (年饭) in the People's Literature. In 1979, Ye joined the China Writers Association and worked in Henan Literature and Art Association. In 1980, Ye wrote the short stories Xinxiang (心香), The Cane Chair (藤椅) and The Chinese Forget-Me-Not (毋忘草). In the same year, she won the National Excellent Short Story Award.

In 1986, Ye moved to Hangzhou and worked for the Zhejiang Writers Association. In 1990, she became the vice president of the Zhejiang Literature and Art Association. In 1992, she became president of the Zhejiang Writers Association and the Mao Dun Faculty of Arts.

From 1990 to 1995, Ye published novels Wumenggu (无梦谷), Wuweichuan (无桅船) and Wuyoushu (无忧树).

== Works ==
=== Long-gestating novels ===
- Wumenggu (无梦谷)
- Wuweichuan (无桅船)
- Wuyoushu(无忧树)

=== Short stories ===
- A Couple of Things (夫妻间的小风波)
- Seven Cents (七角钱)
- Xuemei and Me (我和雪梅)
- Love Thy Neighbours (两家亲)
- Fenghuang A'jiao (凤凰阿娇)
- Danmei (丹梅)
- Snowing in The Chinese New Year's Eve (飘雪的除夕)
- The Chinese New Year's Eve Dinner (年饭)
- Xinxiang (心香)
- The Cane Chair (藤椅)
- The Chinese Forget-Me-Not (毋忘草)

== Awards ==
- National Excellent Short Story Award (1980)
- Chinese Culture Creation Outstanding Achievement Award (1995, New York City)
- Lu Xun Literary and Art Prize (1997)

== Personal life ==
In 1962, Ye married Wang Keqi (王克起) in Neixiang County, Henan Province, Wang was a graduate student at Fudan University.
