= Jiaojiang, Taizhou =

Jiaojiang 椒江区
- District
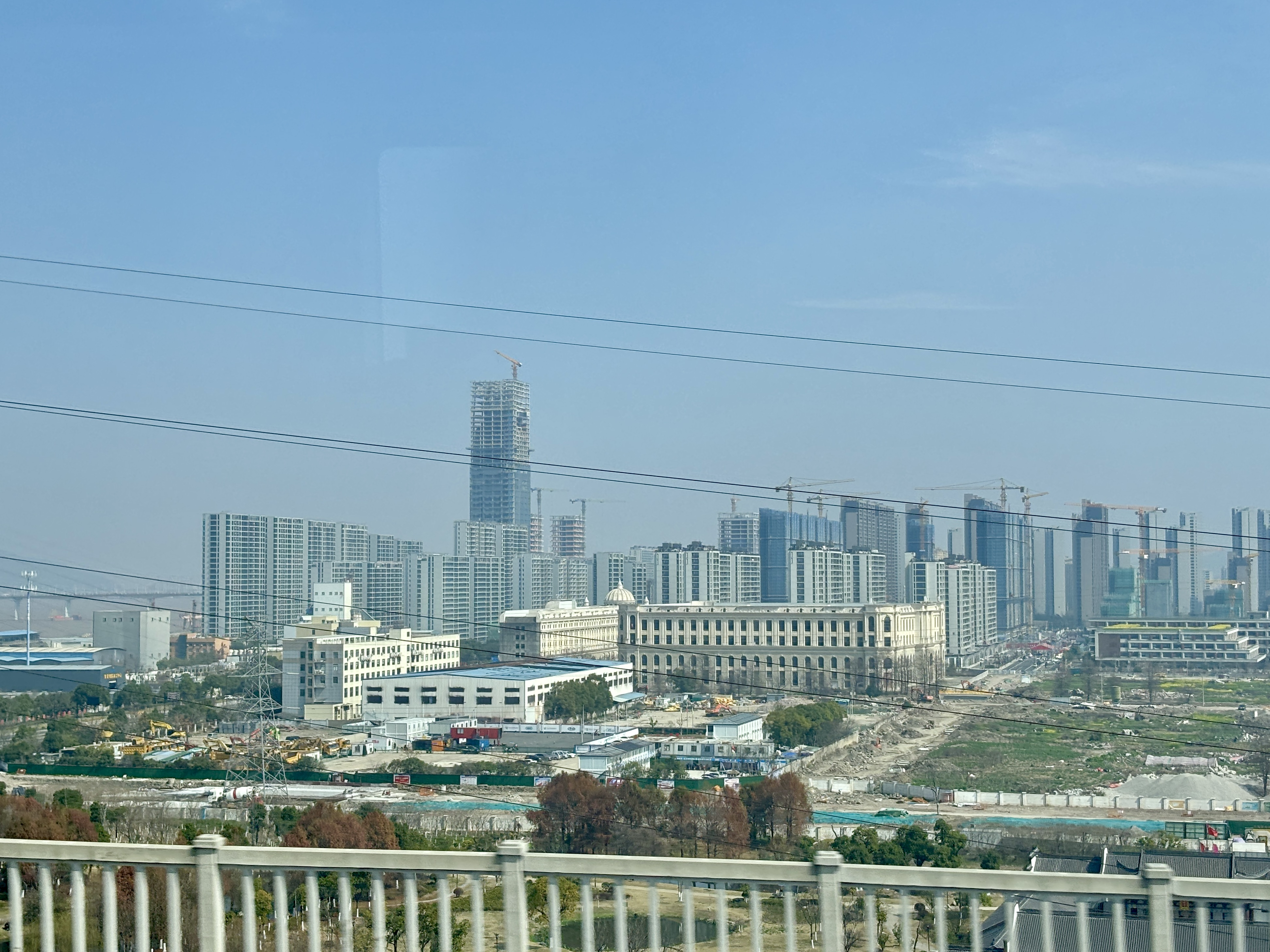

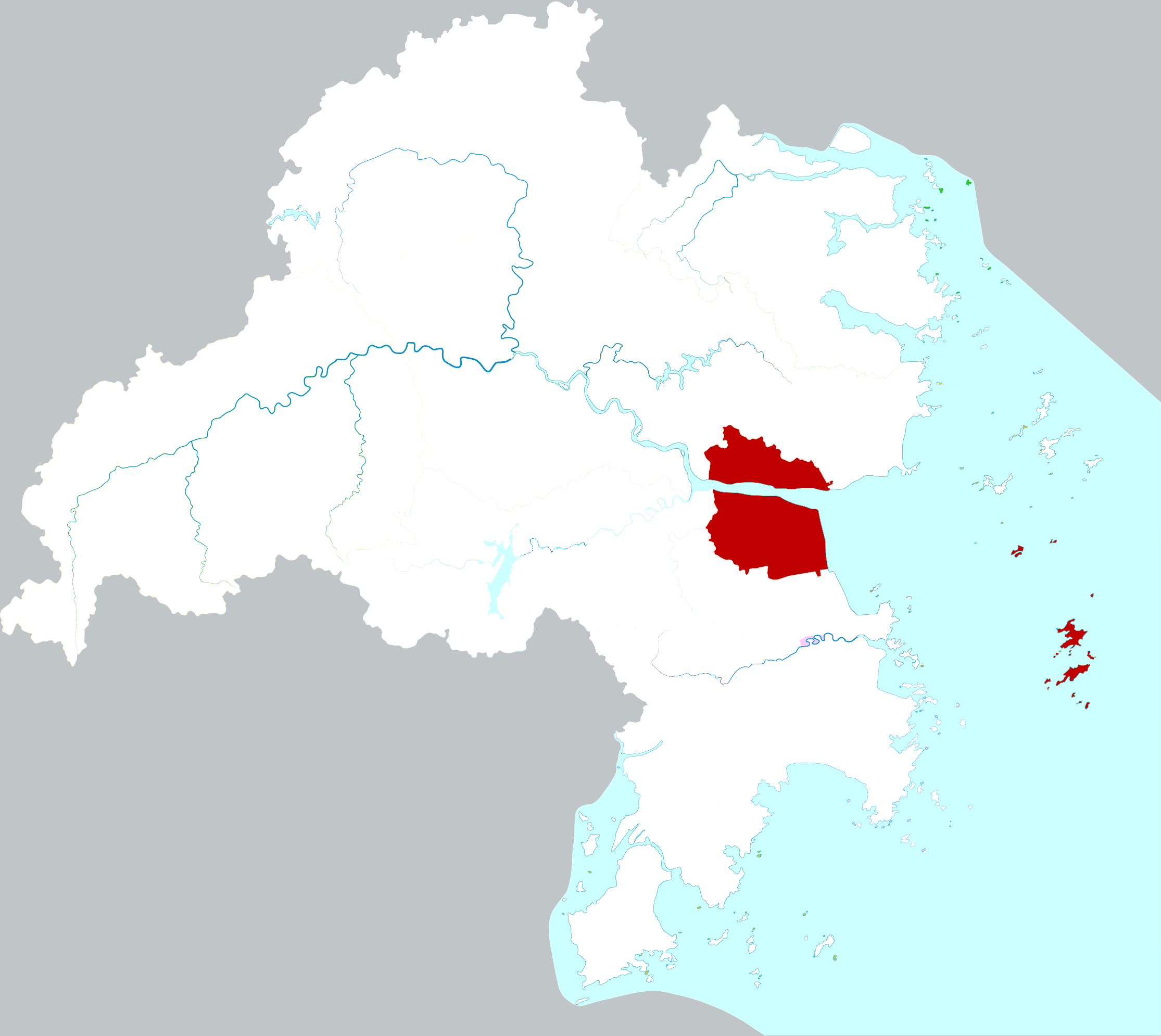
- Location of Jiaojing District within Taizhou

- Location in Zhejiang
- Coordinates: 28°40′N 121°26′E
- Country: People's Republic of China
- Province: Zhejiang
- Prefecture-level city: Taizhou

Area
  - District: 363.79 km^{2} (140.46 sq mi)
  - Urban: 274 km^{2} (106 sq mi)

Population (2020)
  - District: 826,100
  - Density: 2,271/km^{2} (5,881/sq mi)
- Time zone: UTC+8 (China Standard)
- Website: www.jj.gov.cn

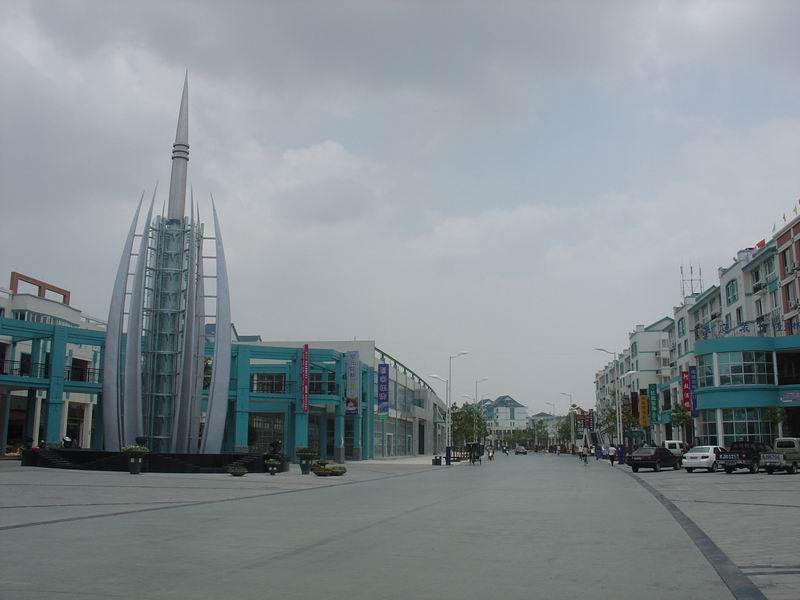
JiaoJiang Taizhou

Jiaojiang District (Tai-chow dialect: Tsiao-kông K'ü; simplified Chinese: 椒江区; traditional Chinese: 椒江區; pinyin: Jiāojiāng Qū) is a district and the seat of the prefecture-level city of Taizhou in Zhejiang Province, China. It is named after the Jiao River (Jiaojiang in Chinese).

Jiaojiang has a mainland area of 266.5 km^{2} (102.9 sq mi), and its islands area is 13.6 km^{2} (5.3 sq mi). The total area is 280.1 km^{2} (108.1 sq mi). As of 2003, the population was approximately 471,500.

Jiaojiang has an average annual precipitation of 1,500 mm (59 in). The average temperature in January is 6 °C, in July it is 28 °C, and average annual temperature is 17 °C.

Until 1980, the district was under the administration of Huangyan and was called Haimen District. When Haimen was upgraded to a county-level city in 1981, it was renamed as Jiaojiang City to avoid confusion with Haimen in Jiangsu province.

In 1994, the prefecture-level city of Taizhou was established, and Jiaojiang City became the main district of Taizhou.

== Administrative divisions ==
Subdistricts:

- Haimen Subdistrict (海门街道), Baiyun Subdistrict (白云街道), Jiazhi Subdistrict (葭沚街道), Zhang'an Subdistrict (章安街道), Hongjia Subdistrict (洪家街道), Xiachen Subdistrict (下陈街道), Qiansuo Subdistrict (前所街道), Sanjia Subdistrict (三甲街道)

The only town is Dachen (大陈镇).

== Notable people ==
=== Ruan Jiqiang ===
Ruan Jiqiang was born in 1923 in Jiaojiang District, Taizhou City, Zhejiang Province. He attended the Agrarian Revolutionary War in May 1938, joined the New Fourth Army in February 1939 and was admitted to the Chinese Communist Party in May 1941.

He graduated from the second Aviation School of the air force. He participated in the Second Sino-Japanese War, Chinese Civil War and the Korean War. He was awarded the three-level Medal of independence and freedom, the three-level Medal of liberation, and the medal of independent merit and honor. He is a retired cadre at the Deputy military level.

He is now the director of the painting and calligraphy branch of the Arctic Temple of the general staff, and a senior art consultant of China Sanwei painting and Calligraphy Academy.

== See also ==
- Taizhou Museum
- Taizhou Library
