= Wenling Library =

Public library in Wenling, Zhejiang, China

- 温岭市图书馆
- 28°21′52.41″N 121°22′20.92″E
- Location: No. 58 Xibin Road, Taiping Street, Wenling (old building); Wuyang Road (North)/ Zhonghua Road (East), Chengxi Street, Wenling (new building), China
- Type: County public library
- Established: 1921
- Reference to legal mandate: Law of the People's Republic of China on Public Libraries

Access and use
- Circulation: 1.45 million volumes (2017)
- Members: Registered population of Wenling, along with the "new citizens of Wenling", who have come to live and work in Wenling.

Other information
- Employees: 18 (2016)
- Affiliation: Bureau of Culture, Radio, Television, Tourism, and Sports of Wenling
- Website: http://www.wllib.cn/

Wenling Library (Chinese: 温岭市图书馆), abbreviated as Wentu (温图), previously referred to as Wenling County Library, is a county-level public library in Wenling, Zhejiang Province, People's Republic of China. It is managed by the Wenling Municipal People's Government and operates as a public service institution under the supervision of the Bureau of Culture, Radio, Television, Tourism, and Sports of Wenling. The library is located at No. 58 Xibin Road, Taiping Street, Wenling. As of 2017, the library's collection reached 1.38 million volumes, earning it the title of National First-Class Library, as rated by the Ministry of Culture and Tourism.

The history of the Wenling Library dates back to the Qing Dynasty during the Qianlong period, with the establishment of Heming Academy, and the founding of the Wenling County Popular Library in 1921. The Wenling Library officially became an independent entity in 1956. The current library building was completed in 1988, with plans to construct a new facility in Chengxi Street. One of the unique features of Wenling Library is its "Family Library Branches," which are a first of their kind in Zhejiang Province.

== History ==
In the 19th year of the Qianlong reign during the Qing Dynasty (1754), Zuo Shiji, the magistrate of Taiping County, founded the Hèming Academy at the site of the long-abandoned Quanxi Academy. The academy had a Zunjing Pavilion with a collection of books. Following this, various academies began to emerge in the Wenling area. In July 1921, the Wenling County Popular Library was established, taking over the 1,200-volume collection and other equipment from Hèming Academy. On September 16, 1930, the Wenling County Public Education Library was founded, merging the Wenling County Popular Library into it. After the founding of the People's Republic of China in late 1949, the Wenling County People's Cultural Center was established, which included a library that took over the books from the Wenling County Public Education Library. On April 5, 1956, Wenling County Library was officially established, housed within the Cultural Center, with the library director concurrently serving as the director of the Cultural Center. The first director was Tong Lipeng. The name "Wenling Library" was inscribed by the calligrapher Sha Menghai. During the Cultural Revolution, the library's activities were suspended, and after 1970, its books were relocated four times, resulting in a continual reduction in its collection.

After the Cultural Revolution, the library resumed operations and underwent comprehensive reorganization in 1978, including reforms in regulations, the introduction of a deposit system for issuing library cards, and the acquisition of new equipment and books. In 1982, a four-story building constructed in conjunction with the county's Cultural Center was completed, serving as the library's premises and covering an area of 300 square meters. On August 14, 1986, the Wenling County Planning Committee approved the construction of a new library building, the current site. The building was completed in 1988, with a total investment of 500,000 yuan and a construction area of 1,760 square meters. (Note: According to the Wenling County Library Affairs Chronicle, the building has a total area of 2,100 square meters (事业志沿革). The current data from the Wenling City Library's official website is used here (本馆概况).) In 1989, the library was named a "National Civilized Library" by the Ministry of Culture. In 1999, a second phase of the library's expansion began, completed in September, and opened to the public on October 1, 2000. This second phase had an investment of over 3 million yuan, expanding the total construction area to 2,490 square meters, with the two phases forming a single complex. In 2011, Wenling Library's internal publication, Reading Wenling (阅读温岭), was launched. In 2013, the Wenling Library new building project was officially approved. On May 1, 2017, Wenling Library began implementing a no-deposit borrowing policy.

== Library facilities ==
=== Xibin Road library ===
The Xibin Road branch of the Wenling Library is located at 58 Xibin Road, Taiping Subdistrict, Wenling City, situated near the Cultural Bridge. Established in 1988, the library has a building area of 4,250 square meters. It offers 403 reading seats, 52 network nodes, and nearly 10 service windows, including lending rooms, periodical rooms, children's rooms, and ancient books rooms. The spacious and bright borrowing hall is equipped with self-service borrowing and returning systems, e-reading machines, and mobile library terminals. In 2013, Wenling Library underwent a comprehensive renovation of the Xibin Road facility, covering an area of 2,440 square meters. After the renovation, new sections were added, such as a comprehensive service hall, a parent-child reading room, the Smart Kids Reading Corner, and a youth lecture hall. The ancient book storage was also renovated, with a standardized ancient book room established, and RFID high-speed self-service borrowing and returning services fully implemented. The library also installed access control systems at the entrance.

=== Chengxi New Library ===
The new Wenling Library is located in Weichuan Village, Chengxi Subdistrict, Wenling, situated north of Wuyang Road and east of Zhonghua Road. The project was approved in December 2012 and officially initiated in 2013, with a total investment of 200 million yuan. The planned building area is approximately 25,000 to 30,000 square meters, with eight functional divisions, including a service hall, a social sciences borrowing center, and a children's borrowing center. The library also features remote monitoring equipment and has added functions such as circulation management, big data analysis, and mobile terminal applications.

== General affairs ==
=== General Information ===
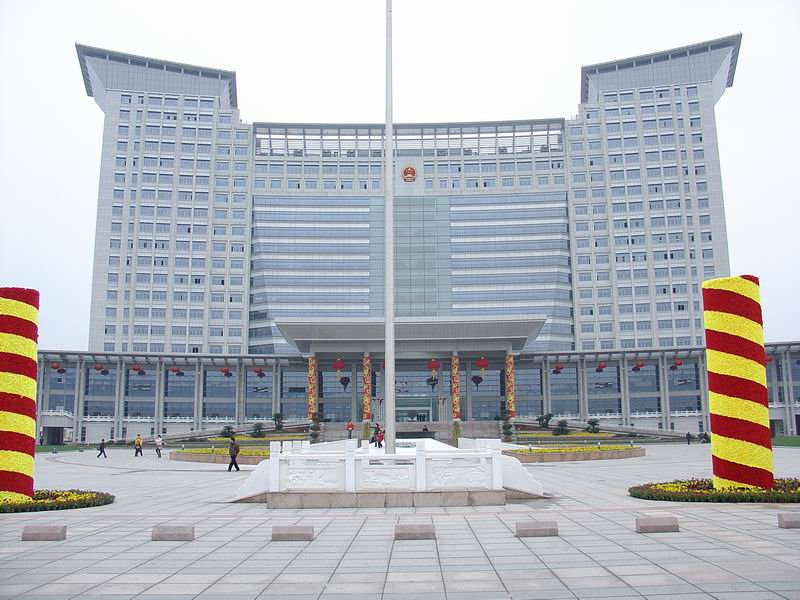
Wenling Municipal People's Government office location is in the Municipal Government Building.

The Wenling Library is supervised by the Municipal Bureau of Culture, Radio, Television, Tourism, and Sports of Wenling and is affiliated with the Wenling Municipal People's Government as a public welfare institution. The library has an initial funding of 13.06 million yuan, with the Wenling Municipal Administration Bureau of Public Institutions as the registration and management authority. The library is open 72 hours per week, averaging 12 hours per day. The current library director is Yang Zhongzhi, with 18 staff members. In 2017, the Wenling Library recorded 1.45 million book borrowings, with a total collection of 1.38 million volumes. In 2016, the main library alone accounted for 753,949 of the 984,490 books borrowed that year.

=== Information center ===
The Wenling Library provides borrowing services to residents with Wenling household registration and new Wenling residents working or living in the city. Previously, a deposit of 150 yuan per book was required to obtain a library card. However, starting from May 1, 2017, the library introduced an innovative deposit-free borrowing system. This system, which does not require a deposit or credit score verification to obtain a library card, was noted by the overseas edition of the People's Daily. The library has also introduced services such as obtaining a library card via WeChat and has enabled ID cards and citizen cards to function as library cards.

=== Digital services ===
Wenling Library began purchasing electronic documents in 2002 and currently provides access to multiple databases for citizens' learning, work, and research. During the 12th Five-Year Plan period, the library expanded its services by acquiring several new databases, including the Wanfang Primary and Secondary School Database and the Founder Children's Library, and launched the "Mobile Library Service." In addition to standard databases, the library has established several local special literature databases, such as the "Genealogy Database," "Wenling Marine Paper Cutting Database," "Century Wenling Database," and the "Wenling Big Drum Database." The library's digital resource service system has won several awards, including the Zhejiang Provincial Department of Culture's Grassroots Public Cultural Service Innovation Award and the National Top Ten Public Library Application Ranking by the China Knowledge Resource Total Library. The system is said to be at the forefront of the province and even the nation. In 2016, digital resource services reached 1,149,888 users.

In addition to digital resource services, Wenling Library has established a QQ consultation group to provide online responses and answer inquiries from grassroots residents. The library has also opened interactive channels, including a website and a WeChat public account. Regarding digital applications within the library, after 2014, the Wenling Library acquired a large number of automated book borrowing machines, replacing the previous manual borrowing process. In April 2018, the library also introduced an "intelligent borrowing and returning machine" that uses facial recognition technology for login.

=== Branch overview ===
Wenling Library's branches cover all 16 townships across the city. In addition to township branches, as of September 2018, six self-service libraries (also known as "Hehe Book Bars") were established within Wenling. The first two self-service libraries were located in the Wenling Urban New Area Administrative Committee and the Wenling Youth Palace, each covering an area of about 300 square meters, with a total collection of over 12,000 books. Both libraries are equipped with self-service card issuance and borrowing/returning machines. The former mainly houses social science and literature books, while the latter focuses on children's books. As of September 2018, the Wenling Library also launched a mobile library, six departmental branch libraries, 70 cultural hall branch libraries, 300 family branch libraries, seven "Cultural and Tourism Libraries," and "Rural Libraries." The "Mobile Library" officially started on December 16, providing book borrowing services to remote areas by carrying up to 3,000 books on a 7.1-meter-long bus.

The "Family Library" is a unique feature of Wenling Library and the first of its kind in Zhejiang Province. In 2016, Wenling Library initiated a heartwarming reading service activity themed around "family." On March 24 of that year, the library announced the "Family Library Branch" plan on its WeChat public platform, recruiting the first batch of 30 family library branches. The registration conditions included having a study room of more than 15 square meters, being able to accommodate no fewer than 100 books, and having a good borrowing record with the library. Within a week, all spots were filled. After screening, the 30 family library branches were officially established on April 23, World Book and Copyright Day. As of November 2018, a total of 300 family libraries had been established, including seven in rural areas. The establishment of family libraries has greatly facilitated the public's ability to borrow books. In 2018, this project won the Best Innovation Award in the First Public Library Innovation and Creativity Promotion Activity organized by the Library Society of China.

== See also ==
- List of libraries in China
