= Wenling =

Wenling 温岭市
- County-level city
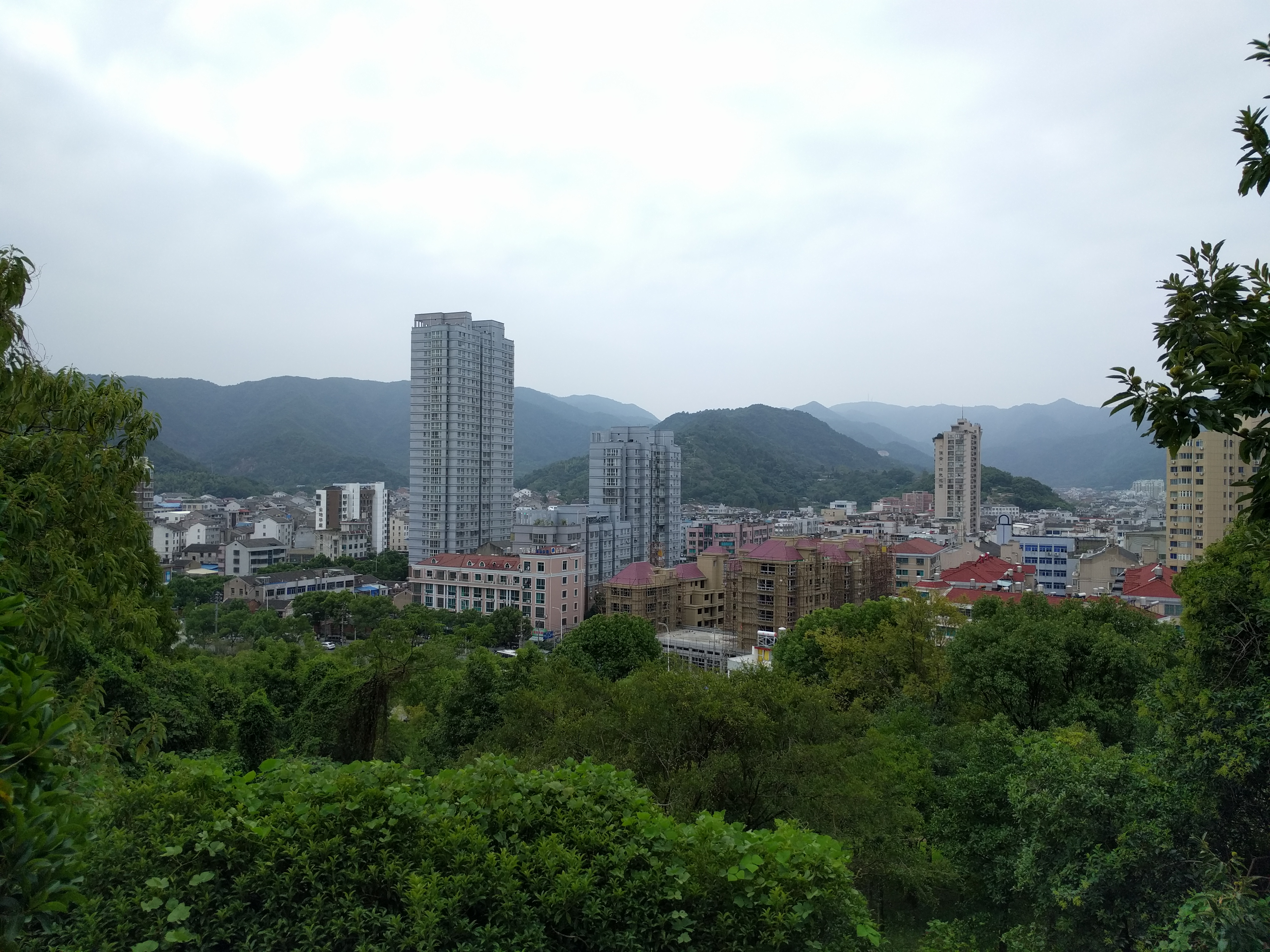

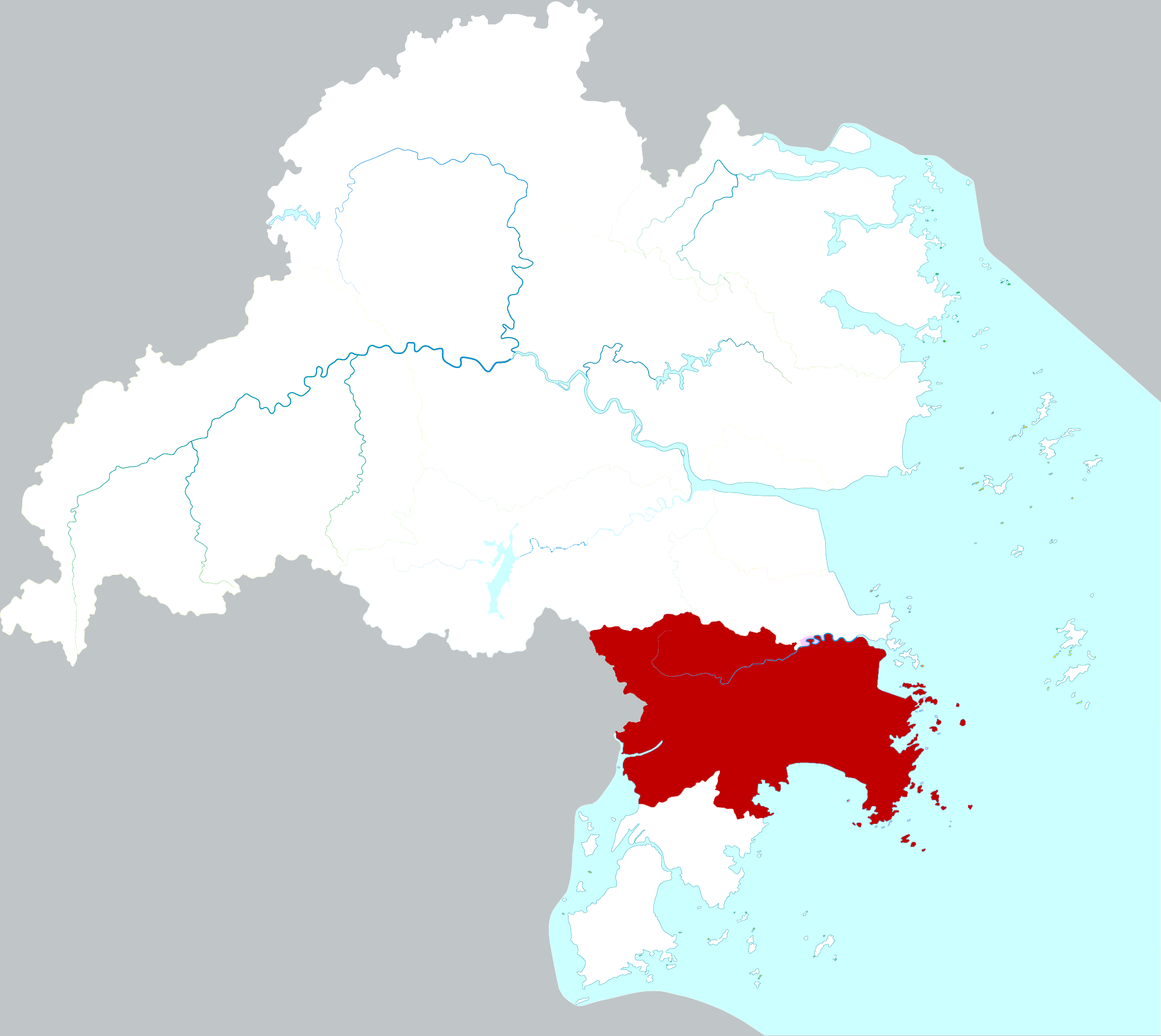
- Location of Wenling City within Taizhou

- Location in Zhejiang
- Coordinates: 28°22′N 121°22′E
- Country: People's Republic of China
- Province: Zhejiang
- Prefecture-level city: Taizhou

Area
  - Land: 926 km^{2} (358 sq mi)
  - Water: 1,079 km^{2} (417 sq mi)

Population
  - Total: 1,366,000
  - Density: 1,480/km^{2} (3,820/sq mi)
- Time zone: UTC+8 (China Standard)
- Area code: (0)576
- License Plate Prefix: 浙J
- Website: www.wl.gov.cn

Wenling (Wenling dialect: Ueng-ling Zy [ʔuəŋ ʔliŋ zɿ]; simplified Chinese: 温岭市; traditional Chinese: 溫嶺市; pinyin: Wēnlǐng Shì) is a coastal county-level city in the municipal region of Taizhou, in southeastern Zhejiang province, China. It borders Luqiao and Huangyan to the north, Yuhuan to the south, Yueqing to the west, looks out to the East China Sea to the east. Wenling locates on 28°22'N, 121°21'E, approximately 300 km (190 mi) south of Shanghai.

Jiangxia Tidal Power Station is located there as well as a number of e-waste recycling centers which have contributed to soil contamination in the region.

Because of its geographical location, Wenling has long suffered from typhoons. On 12 August 2004, Typhoon Rananim, the sixth strongest typhoon in PRC history, landed in Shitang Town, Wenling. On 10 August 2019, Typhoon Lekima, the third strongest in PRC history, came ashore at Chengnan Town, Wenling.

== History ==
During the Xia, Shang, and Zhou dynasties, Wenling was not part of the Chinese state but rather part of the separate culture of Dong'ou. Following the third-century BC conquests of the Qin Empire, it was incorporated into the Minzhong Prefecture before being moved to Kuaiji under the Han. From the Tang to the Ming, Wenling was divided between Taizhou's Huangyan District and Wenzhou's Yueqing District.

In 1469, Taiping County was formed in the area from Fangyan, Taiping, and Fanchang, three villages formerly incorporated into Huangyan. Yueqing County's Shanmen and Yuhuan villages were ceded in 1476. In 1513, the county seat built 2.5 kilometers (1.6 mi) of city wall, roughly squared, giving it the name of "Square Castle". In 1914, the county was renamed Wenling to distinguish it from counties with same name in Shanxi, Sichuan, and Anhui. Wenling ("warm mountain") was once another name of Wenqiao Town.

Wenling was conquered by Communist forces on 28 May 1949, and the county government was created. In March 1994, Wenling was made a county-level "city".

== Geography ==
=== Climate ===
Climate data for Wenling, elevation 35 m (115 ft), (1991–2020 normals, extremes 1981–present)
Month	Jan	Feb	Mar	Apr	May	Jun	Jul	Aug	Sep	Oct	Nov	Dec	Year
Record high °C (°F)	25.0 (77.0)	27.6 (81.7)	30.5 (86.9)	32.0 (89.6)	33.9 (93.0)	36.6 (97.9)	40.6 (105.1)	38.6 (101.5)	37.3 (99.1)	34.6 (94.3)	29.7 (85.5)	25.2 (77.4)	40.6 (105.1)
Mean daily maximum °C (°F)	11.4 (52.5)	12.9 (55.2)	16.1 (61.0)	21.3 (70.3)	25.5 (77.9)	28.5 (83.3)	32.7 (90.9)	32.2 (90.0)	28.7 (83.7)	24.4 (75.9)	19.5 (67.1)	14.1 (57.4)	22.3 (72.1)
Daily mean °C (°F)	7.5 (45.5)	8.6 (47.5)	11.8 (53.2)	16.7 (62.1)	21.3 (70.3)	24.9 (76.8)	28.7 (83.7)	28.4 (83.1)	25.1 (77.2)	20.5 (68.9)	15.5 (59.9)	9.9 (49.8)	18.2 (64.8)
Mean daily minimum °C (°F)	4.5 (40.1)	5.6 (42.1)	8.7 (47.7)	13.3 (55.9)	18.2 (64.8)	22.2 (72.0)	25.8 (78.4)	25.5 (77.9)	22.3 (72.1)	17.3 (63.1)	12.4 (54.3)	6.7 (44.1)	15.2 (59.4)
Record low °C (°F)	−4.3 (24.3)	−2.6 (27.3)	−2.0 (28.4)	2.7 (36.9)	8.9 (48.0)	14.6 (58.3)	20.0 (68.0)	20.0 (68.0)	15.2 (59.4)	6.0 (42.8)	−0.2 (31.6)	−3.6 (25.5)	−4.3 (24.3)
Average precipitation mm (inches)	79.3 (3.12)	84.5 (3.33)	139.1 (5.48)	125.1 (4.93)	175.5 (6.91)	237.4 (9.35)	149.1 (5.87)	311.4 (12.26)	207.3 (8.16)	88.8 (3.50)	96.0 (3.78)	69.6 (2.74)	1,763.1 (69.43)
Average precipitation days (≥ 0.1 mm)	12.3	13.4	17.6	16.0	16.1	17.5	12.2	15.8	12.8	7.8	10.9	10.7	163.1
Average snowy days	1.6	1.4	0.3	0	0	0	0	0	0	0	0	0.6	3.9
Average relative humidity (%)	72	75	76	76	79	83	78	79	78	73	75	70	76
Mean monthly sunshine hours	99.7	90.9	108.8	125.9	129.9	108.7	215.4	194.8	146.8	152.6	110.1	118.6	1,602.2
Percentage possible sunshine	31	29	29	33	31	26	51	48	40	43	35	37	36
Source: China Meteorological Administration All-time Oct extreme

== Demographics ==
According to the 2020 Chinese census, Wenling had a resident population of 1,416,199, reflecting a 3.6% growth since the 2010 census. With a population density of 1,529 individuals per square kilometer, Wenling ranks as the eighth-most densely populated county-level city in China. As of 2021, the population with registered households in Wenling stood at 1,216,235.

Migrants account for 29.6% of the total resident population. Guizhou is the top province of origin of the migrants.

=== Language ===
Like the majority of areas in Zhejiang, most people from Wenling speak a dialect of Wu Chinese, known as Wenling Hua. It is not mutually intelligible with Mandarin Chinese, and partially intelligible with (also Wu) Shanghainese. There is also a small portion of Min Nan speakers in the southeastern regions, especially in Shitang Town. The linguistic diversity of some regions has resulted in a segment of the population becoming fluent in speaking up to three languages, when Mandarin is included.

== Economy ==
In the 2022 CCID Top 100 Counties ranking, Wenling secured the 16th position. With a GDP of 125.69 billion yuan in 2021, the city's GDP per capita stands at 103,158 yuan (approximately 15,990 US dollars). The services sector represents 48.7% of Wenling's total GDP, amounting to 125.69 billion yuan in 2021. The industrial sector, contributing 44.5%, accounts for a GDP of 55.92 billion yuan, while agriculture and related sectors collectively share 6.8%.

Wenling serves as a significant manufacturing center, with its largest industrial sector focusing on the production of pumps, valves, and compressors. Notably, five out of seven publicly traded pump manufacturers in China are based in Wenling. The town is also prominent for its shoemaking industry, manufacturing of bearings, gears, shafts, transmission components, automotive parts and accessories, as well as electric machines.

Construction is also a pillar of the city's economy, it comprises 20% of the industrial sector.

=== Companies headquartered in Wenling ===
- Zhejiang Qianjiang Motorcycle Co., Ltd. (SZSE: 000913)
- LEO Group Co., Ltd. (SZSE: 002131)
- Aishida Co., Ltd. (SZSE: 002403)
- Shimge Pump Industry Co., Ltd. (SZSE: 002532)
- Zhejiang Yueling Co., Ltd. (SZSE: 002725)
- Fuling Global Inc. (~~Nasdaq: FORK~~)
- Zhejiang Doyin Technology Co., Ltd. (SZSE: 002793)
- Zhejiang Zomax Transmission Co., Ltd. (SSE: 603767)
- Zhejiang Dayuan Pumps Industry Co., Ltd (SSE: 603757)
- Forest Packaging Group Co., Ltd. (SSE: 605500)
- Wenling Zhejiang Measure & Cut Tools Trading CTR Co., Ltd. (SEHK: 1379)
- Zhejiang Taifu Pump Co., Ltd. (SZSE: 300992)
- Xinlei Compressor Co., Ltd. (SZSE: 301317)
- Shuguang Holding Group
- Tiansong Construction Group
- Wanbangde Pharmaceutical Holding Group Co., Ltd. (SZSE: 002082)
- Zhejiang TianShi Shipbuilding Co., Ltd.

== Education ==
The city is segmented into various public school districts for primary and junior secondary education, supplemented by a selection of private institutions. It comprises 85 primary schools (with 34 campuses and 7 private schools), 33 junior secondary schools (including 3 campuses and 3 private schools), a nine-year school, a sports school, an art school, and a special school. In 2022, the first-grade enrollment reached 15,620 students, while the seventh-grade enrollment stood at 14,408. Admission to public schools is contingent upon household registration and family property ownership for new students. There are ten migrant schools for the children of migrant workers who are not eligible to enroll in public schools.

For senior secondary education, there are fourteen regular high schools and three vocational schools. The enrollment number for the first grade of high school in 2020 is 6170, and the number for the first grade of vocational school is 5095. Students are admitted on the basis of their zhongkao results.

There are also 189 kindergartens, 134 of which are private.

Some students may participate in extracurricular activities. Adults can take adult education at training institutes. There are 149 training institutes, covering the training of sports, arts, English and skills training.

There is an open university offering distance learning. Residents may use the services of the Wenling City Library and its dozens of branches.

=== Primary and junior secondary schools ===
- Fangcheng Elementary School
- Taiping Elementary School
- Wenling Experimental Elementary School
- Henghu Elementary School
- Sanxing Elementary School
- Jinyuan Elementary School
- Wenling No.3 Middle School
- Wenling No.4 Middle School
- Wenling High School Experimental Middle School
- Wenling Experimental School
- Wenling Teenagers Amateur Sports School
- Wenling United Art School Affiliated to China Conservatory

=== Senior secondary schools ===
- Wenling High School
- Xinhe High School
- Wenling No.2 High School
- Ruoheng High School
- Songmen High School
- Daxi High School
- Zeguo High School Affiliated to Zhejiang Normal University
- Zhijiang High School
- Wenling High School Bilingual School
- Yucai School
- Shusheng High School
- Fanchang School
- Yuying Experimental School
- Cunzhi Foreign Language School

=== Vocational schools ===
- Wenling Vocational Technical School
- Taizhou First Technician College
- Wenling Vocational Secondary School

== Government ==
The municipal government is regulated by the local committee of the Chinese Communist Party (CCP), headed by the Wenling CCP committee secretary. The local CCP committee issues administrative orders, manages the economy, directs the Standing Committee of the local People's Congress in policy-making and supervision of local government, and directs the Standing Committee of the local People's Consultative Conference in consultation.

Government officials include the mayor and several deputy mayors. Numerous bureaus deal with law, public security and other matters.

=== Administrative divisions ===
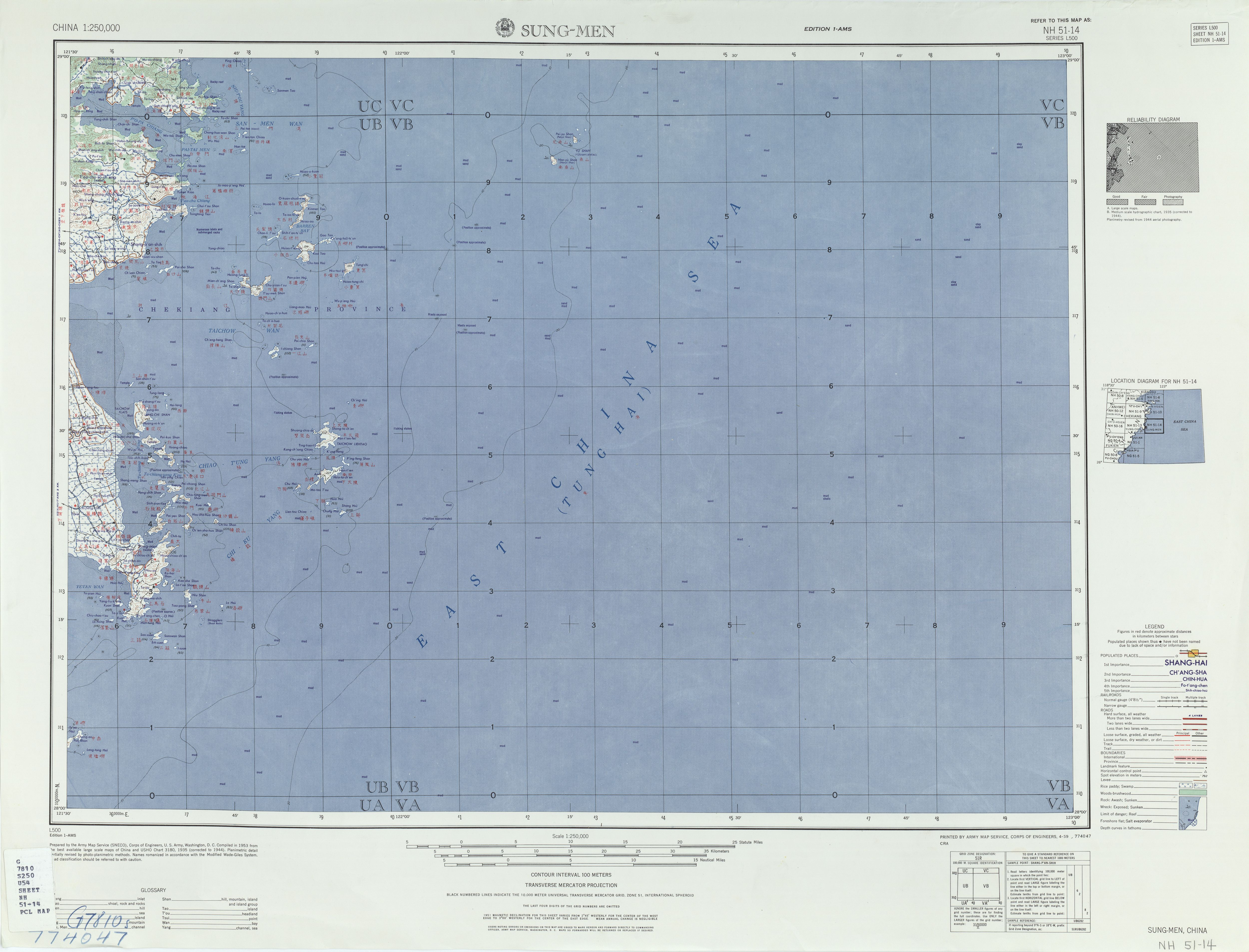
Songmen (labelled as Sung-men 松門) (1953)

The county-level city of Wenling currently administers 5 subdistricts and 11 towns.

- Taiping Subdistrict (Tha-bing Ka-dau)太平街道
- Chengdong Subdistrict (Zhing-tung Ka-dau)城東街道
- Chengxi Subdistrict (Zhing-shi Ka-dau)城西街道
- Chengbei Subdistrict (Zhing-puk Ka-dau)城北街道
- Hengfeng Subdistrict (Wang-fung Ka-dau)橫峰街道
- Daxi Town (Da-khi Cing)大溪鎮
- Zeguo Town (Dzak-kuk Cing)澤國鎮
- Xinhe Town (Shing-ghou Cing)新河鎮
- Ruoheng Town (Niak-wong Cing)箬橫鎮
- Songmen Town (Shiung-meng Cing)松門鎮
- Wenqiao Town (Ueng-giau Cing)溫嶠鎮
- Wugen Town (U-keng Cing)塢根鎮
- Chengnan Town (Zhing-nae Cing)城南鎮
- Shiqiaotou Town (Zhik-giau-deu Cing)石橋頭鎮
- Binhai Town (Ping-he Cing)濱海鎮
- Shitang Town (Zhik-dong Cing)石塘鎮

== Transportation ==
=== Public transportation ===
Taizhou Rail Transit Line S1 serves Wenling Railway Station and the western portion of the city, terminating at Chengnan.

There are 26 bus routes serving the urban area operated by 3 bus agencies and 62 bus routes serving the rural area.

=== Railways ===
Wenling Railway Station is located in Daxi and served by Ningbo-Taizhou-Wenzhou Railway and Hangzhou–Taizhou high-speed railway. In 2017, its annual ridership is about 8.5 million.

=== Highways and roads ===
G15 Shenyang–Haikou Expressway runs through the northwest of Wenling. G1523 Ningbo–Dongguan Expressway runs through the east of Wenling. Both connect Ningbo and Wenzhou.

Other arterial roads include China National Highway 104, China National Highway 228, Zhejiang Provincial Highway 225, Zhejiang Provincial Highway 226, Zhejiang Provincial Highway 324, Daxi-Shinian-Songmen First Grade Highway, Luqiao-Zeguo-Taiping First Grade Highway and Luqiao-Zeguo-Taiping Elevated Highway.

=== Airports ===
There is no airport in Wenling. Taizhou Luqiao Airport is the closest, located 26 kilometers (16 miles) to the north. Wenling is planning to build a general airport in Dongpu Farm.

=== Cycling ===
Public bicycle service was launched in December 2011 with 3000 bikes and 300 bike racks in the urban area and selected towns. There are 10000 residents commuted by public bicycles each day in 2016. More separated bike lanes are installed in both urban and rural areas.

Hellobike, a private bike sharing service provider, has services in the urban area.

== Food ==
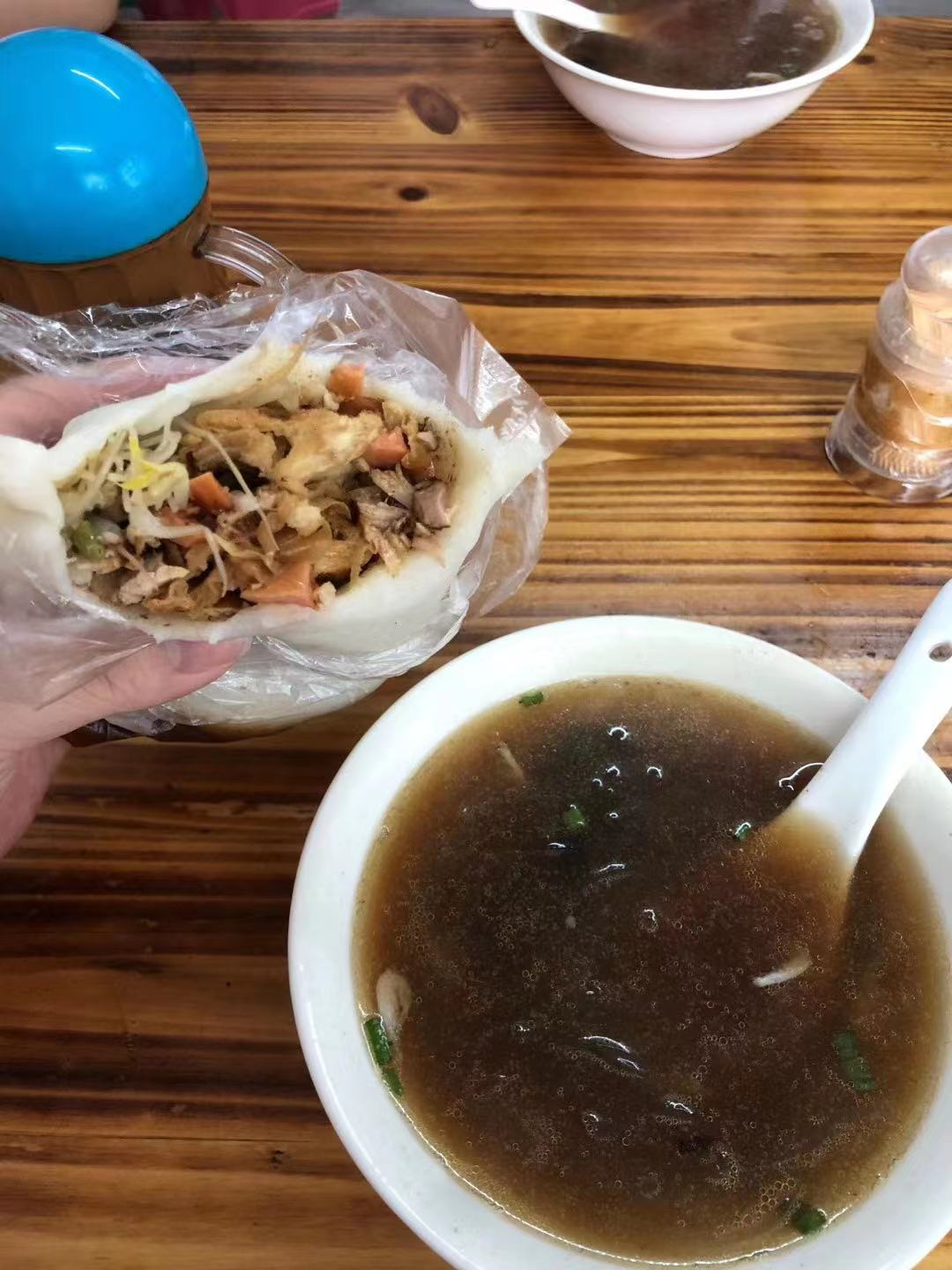
QianGao

1. Qiangao (嵌糕; pinyin: Qiàngāo) is made with rice cake (Niangao) and many different dishes like fried noddle, carrots, potatoes, pork, tofu, and whatever people want. Qiangao is shaped like a big dumpling, and all the dishes are stuffed inside of it.
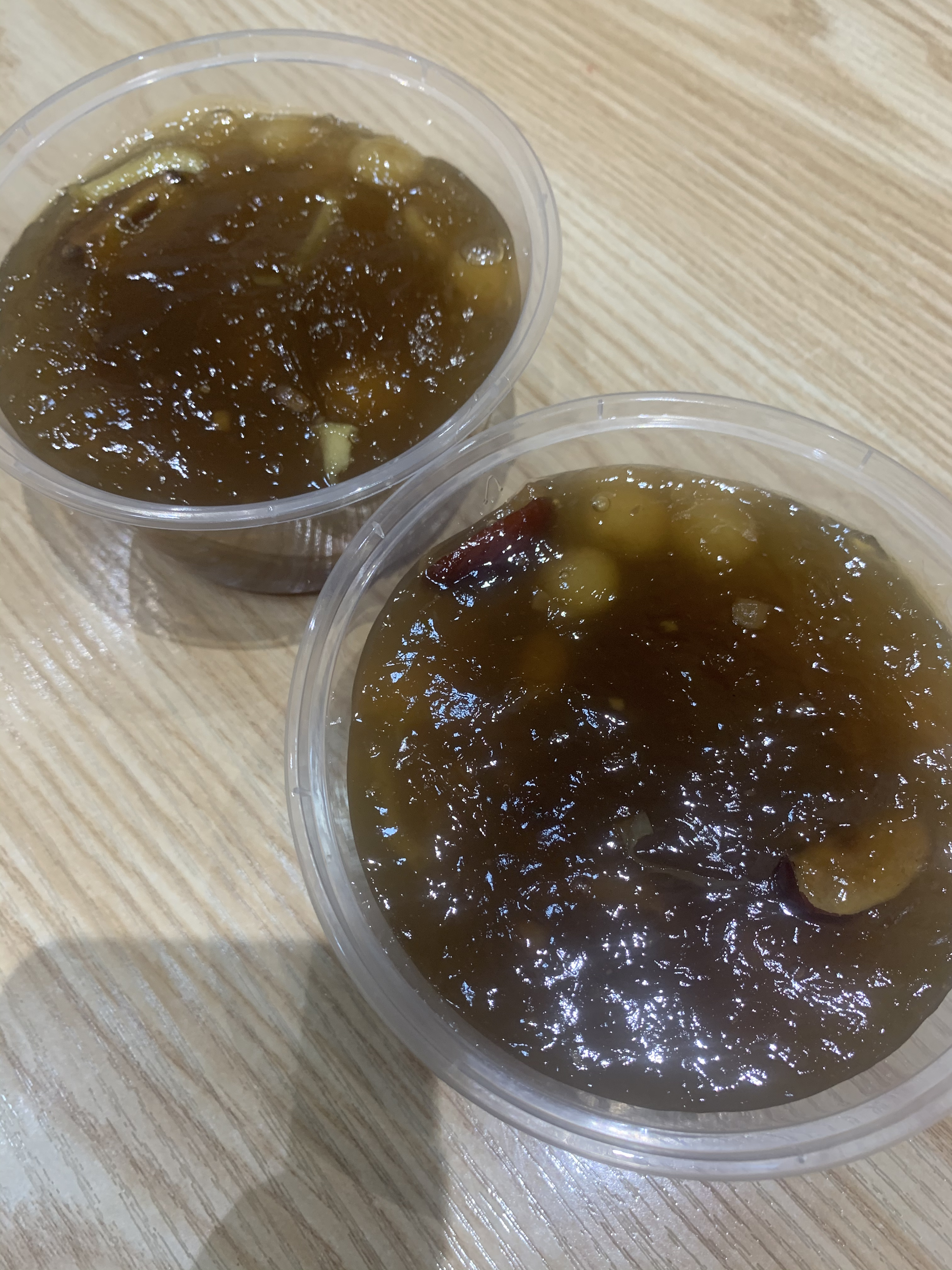
2. Shanfenhu
  Shanfenhu (山粉糊; pinyin: Shānfenhú) is made with Shanfen which is the powder made from potato related plants. Shanfenhu is sticky and gelatinous. Different things are commonly added to it. For example, for a salty taste, pork, mushroom, beans, tofu, peanut, etc. can be added; for a sweet dish, red dates, raisins, lotus seeds, brown sugar, etc. can be added.
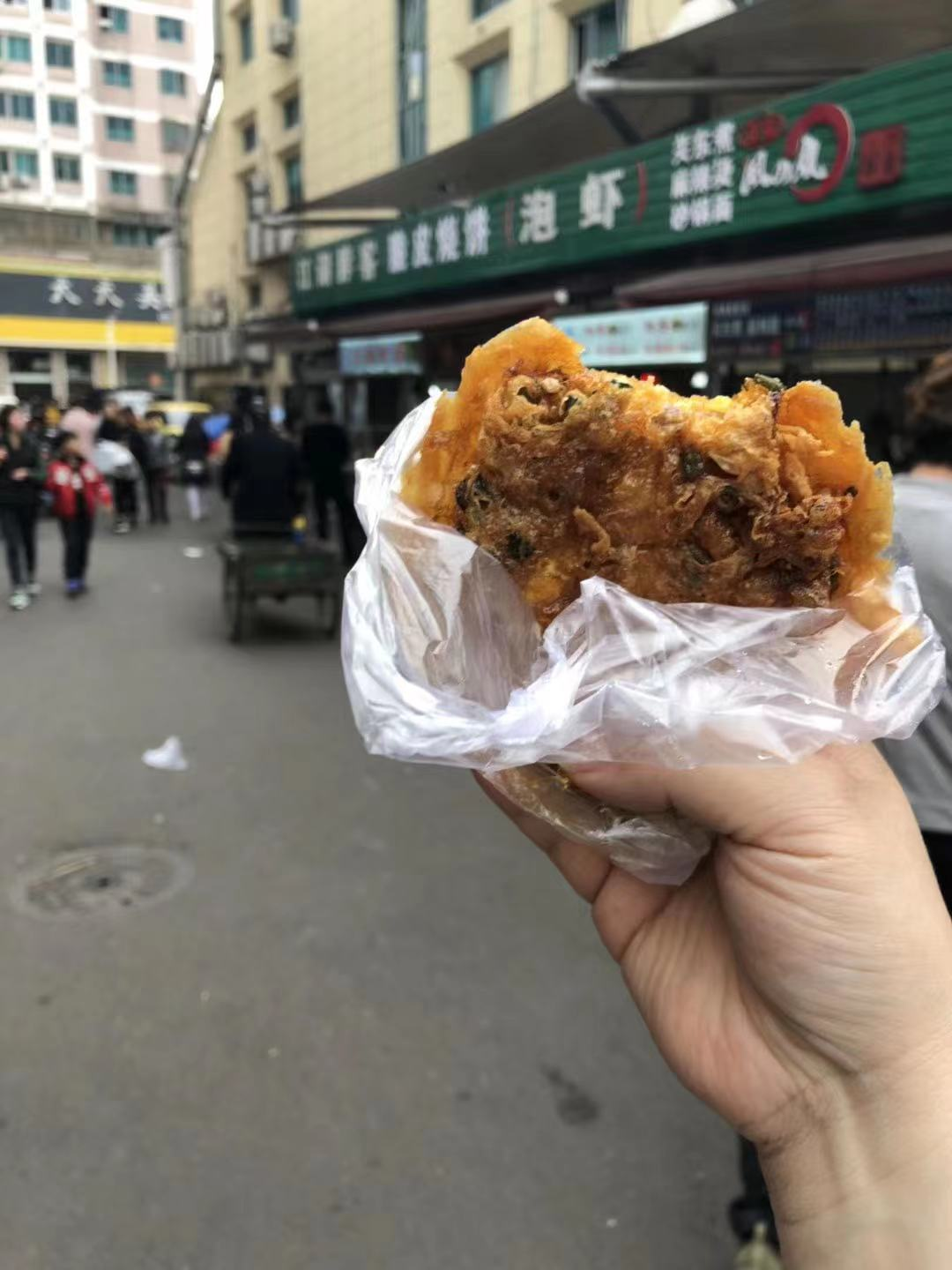
3. Paoxia
  Paoxia (泡虾; pinyin: Pàoxiā) is a famous street snack in Wenling. It is translated as "Fried Shrimp," but it is not actual shrimp. It is fried dough made with wheat flour and stuffed with pork and cabbage.
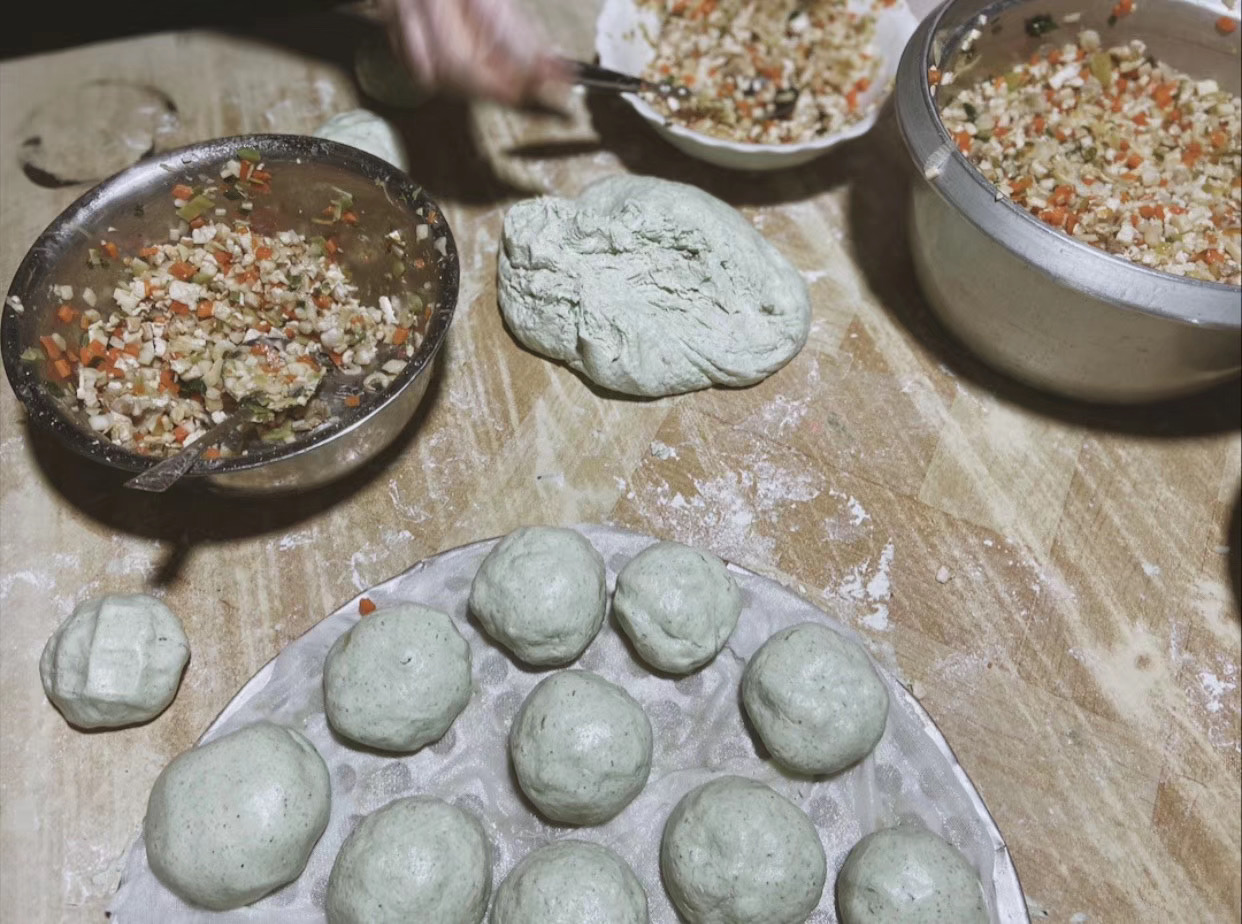
4. Chuiyuan
  Chuiyuan (炊圆; pinyin: Chūiyuán) is made with glutinous rice. Dried small shrimp, pork, tofu, and carrots are stuffed into the glutinous rice bun.
5. Maibingtong (麦饼筒; pinyin: Màibǐngtǒng) are thin crepes made from wheat flour mixed with Pseudognaphalium affine and some other green vegetable juices. Additional ingredients such as pork, stir-fried eggs, shrimp, onions, stir-fried noodles, etc. are added onto the crepes, which are then rolled up.

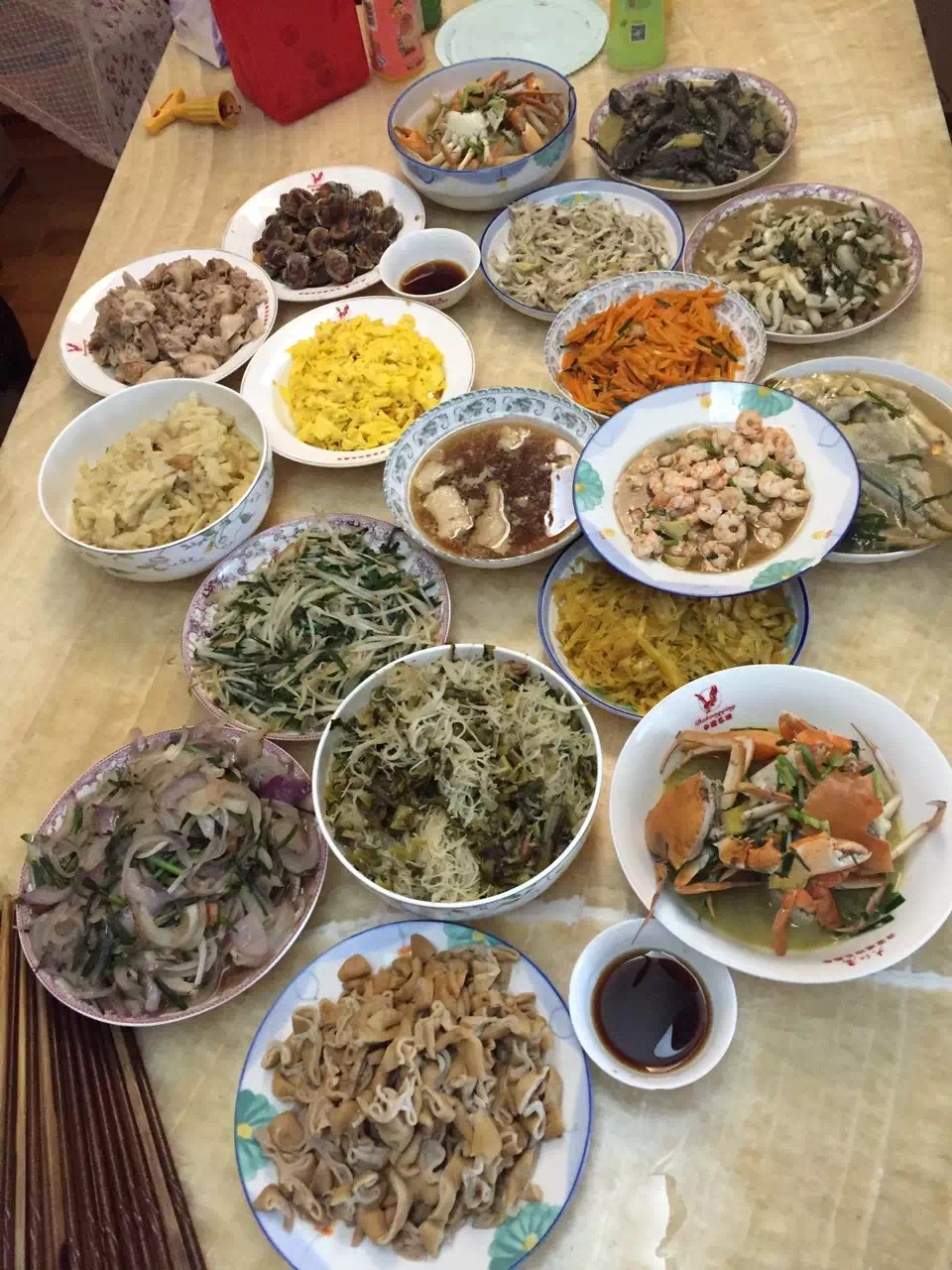
Maibingtong

== Media ==
Wenling Media Convergence Center is the only media group in Wenling. It covers newspaper, television, radio, website and mobile app.

- Wenling Daily
- Wenling Television
- Wenling News mobile app
- Wenling Radio (103.6 MHz)

== Notable people ==
- Fang Ganmin (1906–1984), painter, sculptor and educator, regarded as one of the fathers of Chinese oil painting; born in Wenling
- Ke Zhao (1910–2002), mathematician; born in Wenling
- Li Rong (1920–2002), linguist, known for his work on Chinese dialectology; born in Wenling
- Lin Xiling (1935–2009), activist and dissident, known for defending Hu Feng, lived in Wenling from the 1930s until 1953
- Zhao Yide (born 1965), politician and the current Party Secretary of Shaanxi; born in Wenling
- Lü Lin (born 1969), table tennis player and gold medal winner at the 1992 Summer Olympics; born in Wenling
- Guo Xiaolu (born 1973), novelist, memoirist and film-maker; born in Wenling
- Tom Tong (born 1975), entrepreneur and founder of Ganqishi; born in Wenling
- Joe Chen (born 1989), singer; born in Wenling
- Dan Tsao (born ?), publisher, founded Metro Chinese Weekly in Philadelphia; born in Wenling
- William David Rudland (1839–1912), Christian Evangelist, set up a Christian mission sub-station in Wenling

== International Relations ==
Wenling has five friendly exchange cities.

- Logan City, Australia (since 30 December 1995)
- Seo District, Daejeon, South Korea (since 22 December 2006)
- Coclé Province, Panama (since 22 September 2017)
- Sabinsky District, Russia (since 18 May 2018)
- Wuppertal, Germany (since 3 December 2018)

== Namesake ==
- Chinese minesweeper Wenling (817), a PLAN East Sea Fleet Type 082I mine countermeasure vessel commissioned in 2004
- 14147 Wenlingshuguang (1998 SG43), a main-belt asteroid discovered in 1998, named after the event of the first sunlight (“Shuguang” in Chinese) of the new millennium shining on Wenling
- Wenling shark virus, a virus found in an expanded group of potential arthropod and vertebrate host species that has many similarities with Hepatitis C Viruses
- Wenling crustacean virus, a group of viruses found in arthropoda and crustaceans

== Accidents and incidents ==
- 13 June 2020 – Wenling tanker truck explosion disaster, a fuel truck crashed and exploded, killing 19 and injuring over 170 people in Liangshan Village, close to the city of Wenling.

== See also ==
- The Taizhou Museum displays a section about the customs and festivals of this city.
- Wenling Library
