= Taizhou University =

Taizhou University may refer to:

- Taizhou University (Zhejiang) (Chinese: 台州学院), a university in Taizhou, Zhejiang
- Taizhou University (Jiangsu) (Chinese: 泰州学院), a university in Taizhou, Jiangsu

== See also ==
- Taizhou (disambiguation)
