= Taizō =

- Gender: Male

Origin
- Origin: Japanese
- Meaning: Different meanings depending on the kanji used

== People ==
Taizō, Taizo or Taizou (written: 泰三, 泰造, 大造 or 太蔵) is a masculine Japanese given name. Notable people with the name include:

- Taizo Harada (原田 泰造; born 1970), Japanese comedian and actor
- Taizo Ichinose (一ノ瀬 泰造; 1947–1973), Japanese war photographer
- Taizō Ishizaka (石坂 泰三; 1886–1975), Japanese businessman
- Taizo Kawamoto (川本 泰三; 1914–1985), Japanese footballer and manager
- Taizo Kawada (川田 太三; 1944–2026), Japanese golf critic and designer
- Taizô Kawashima, Japanese production designer and art director
- Taizō Mikazuki (三日月 大造; born 1971), Japanese politician
- Taizo Nishimuro (西室 泰三; born 1935), Japanese businessman
- Taizo Sugitani (杉谷 泰造; born 1976), Japanese equestrian
- Taizō Sugimura (杉村 太蔵; born 1979), Japanese politician

== Fictional Characters ==
- Taizo Tachibana (立花泰三) a character in the film Godzilla, Mothra and King Ghidorah: Giant Monsters All-Out Attack
- Taizo Hasegawa (長谷川 泰三) a character in the manga and anime Gintama

== See also ==
- Taizō-in, a Zen Buddhist temple in Kyoto, Japan
- Taizhou (disambiguation)
