= Mou Jinxiang =

Chinese businesswoman

- 牟金祥
- Born: 1 March 1954 (age 72)
- Citizenship: The Republic of China
- Occupations: Co-founder; Lianhe Chemical Technology
- Partner: Wang Zhihua
- Children: Wang Ping

Mou Jinxiang is a Chinese businesswoman who is the former chairwoman of Lianhe Chemical Technology, a pesticide, pharmaceuticals and chemical producer based in Taizhou, China.

Mou is a billionaire. She co-founded Lianhe Chemical Technology in 1985 with her husband Wang Zhihua, who later died in the 1990s. The company then went public that at the Shenzhen Stock Exchange in 2008.

In 2015, Mou's wealth increased to over a billion dollars based on Lianhe Chemical Technology's increased profits. Later in 2016, Mou was recognized by Forbes as one of the most powerful businesswomen in Asia. On 3 September 2021, she reduced her holdings by more than half, of her 10772400 shares, accounting for 1.1668% of the total share capital of the company.
