= Walled City of Taizhou Fu =

Wall built around the city of Linhai

Coordinates: 28°50′57″N 120°06′23″E

The Walled City of Taizhou Fu (Chinese: 台州府城) stands as a cultural preservation area and tourist attraction in Linhai, Zhejiang, China. Serving as the prefectural seat of Taizhou from 591 to 1993, it encompasses significant cultural landmarks such as the city walls of Taizhou Fu, the Jianshan Towers, Enze Hospital, Ziyang Street, and East Lake. The city's fortifications were initially erected during the Eastern Jin dynasty (317–420) and have been reinforced over the years to provide protection against military assaults and flooding. Since 2006, the city walls of Taizhou Fu were placed on China's tentative list for World Heritage status.

== History ==
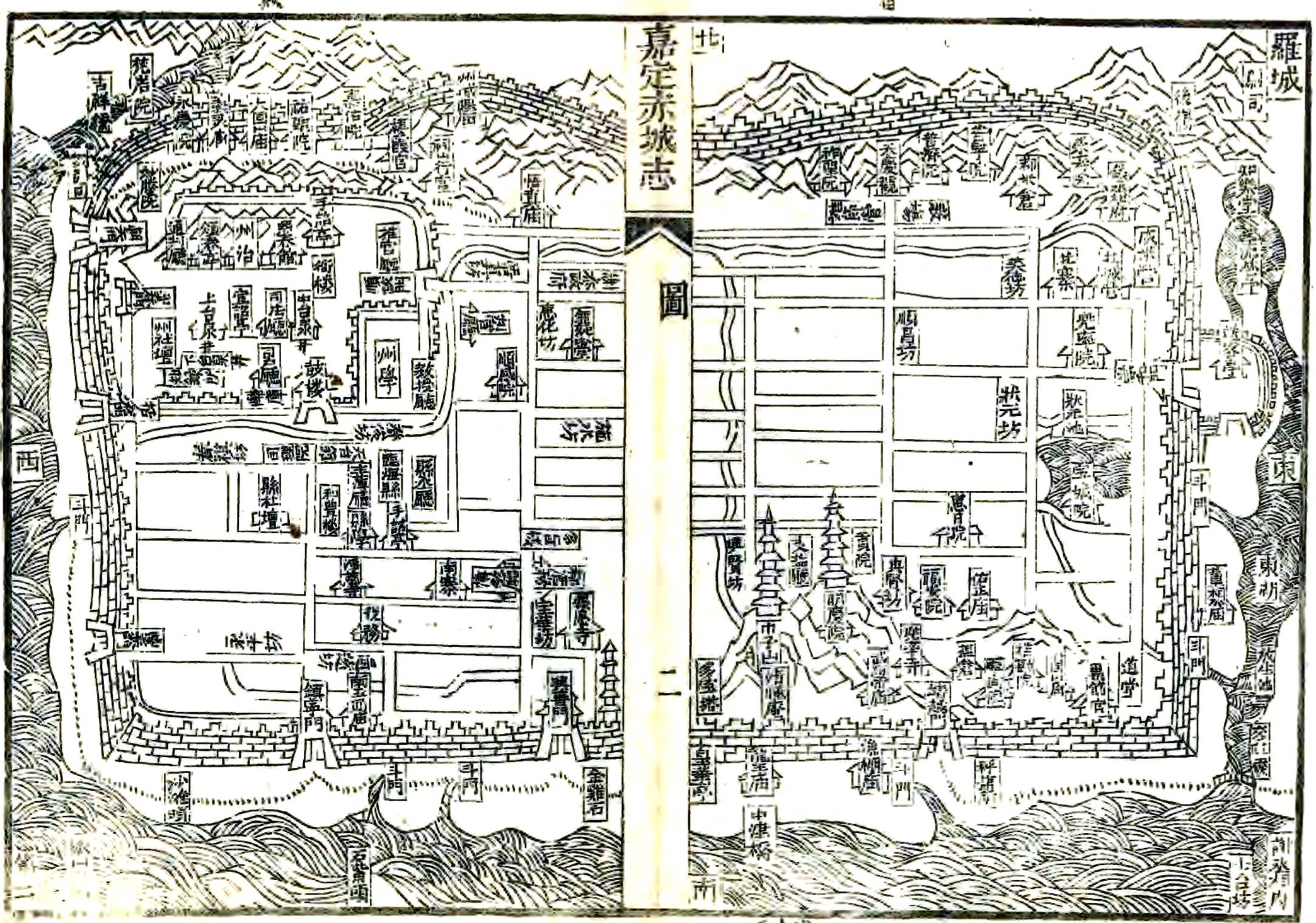
The map of Taizhou Fu city mentioned in the "Jiading Chicheng Chronicles"

Linhai, located at the geographical centre of Taizhou, has historically served as the centre of culture and education in the region. The administrative division of Linhai was first defined in 257, when Eastern Wu divided the Kuaiji Commandery, thus establishing the Linhai Commandery. By 591, the administrative seat of Linhai was shifted to the area near Dalu Mountain, which remained unchanged ever since. In 622, the prefecture was renamed as Taizhou, a decision inspired by the presence of the Tiantai Mountains within its vicinity, with Linhai as the county name under the prefecture. This marked the genesis of the name "Taizhou".

The administrative centre of Taizhou was consistently located in Linhai since 257 until it was transferred to Jiaojiang in 1993. In Chinese, "Fu" referred to the seat of government, hence the name "Taizhou Fu" for Linhai.

== City walls ==
The layout of the Walled City is roughly square, with a total perimeter of approximately 6,287 meters. The city walls extend primarily from the northeast to the southwest, standing 7 meters high, and feature four gates, defensive towers, and eight bastions. The design takes advantage of the terrain; on the north side, it stretches along the ridge of Beigu Mountain to the east bank of the Ling River, and to the west, it reaches the western foothills of Jin Mountain, creating a defensive system that backs onto Beigu Mountain and faces the Ling River. The northern section, built along the mountain, is the most formidable due to its terrain. The western and southern sides, which face the river, have a combined length of 2,370 meters. The eastern wall, which was 1,615 meters long, was demolished in 1956, while the northern wall, 2,300 meters long and situated along the ridge line, was rebuilt in the 1990s based on the original foundations.

=== Construction ===
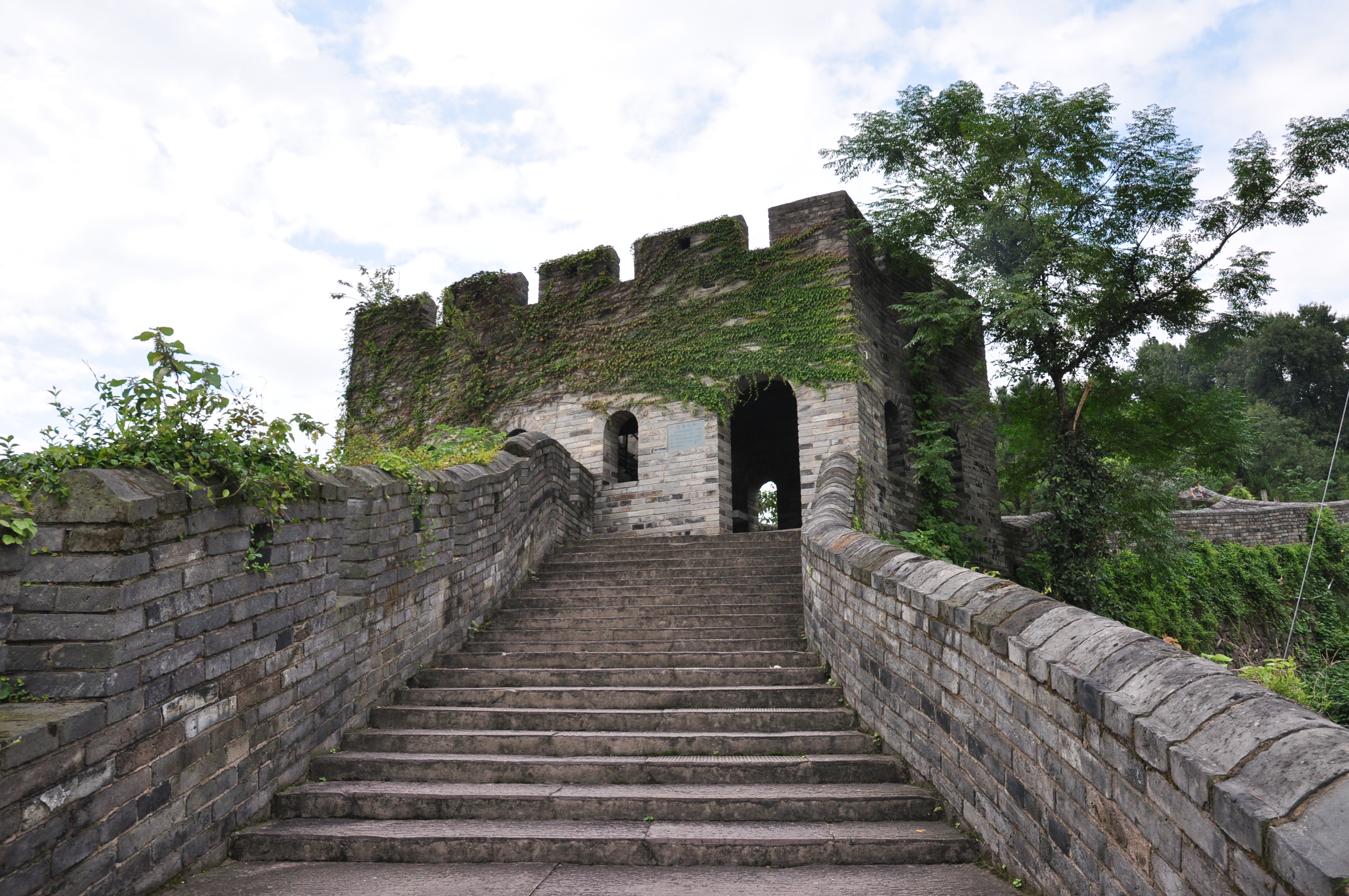
The watchtowers of the city wall

The city walls were initially constructed during the Eastern Jin period. In 978 AD, to show allegiance to the Song dynasty, the king of Wuyue decided to demolish city walls across his country. However, Linhai's walls along the Ling River were spared due to their importance in flood control. In 1045 AD, the governor Peng Siyong undertook significant repairs of the city walls, utilising brick and stone masonry techniques with sticky rice or lime mortar as a binder, which not only made the walls more robust but also improved their flood control capability. In 1071 AD, Governor Qian Xuan repositioned the walls inward towards the East Lake to satisfy military defence and flood control needs, setting the architectural style and structure of Taizhou Fu's city walls.

During the Song dynasty, the city developed a unique double-wall structure, with subsidiary walls on the east, south, and west sides, featuring gates named Shunzheng, Qiao, and Yingchun, respectively. The renowned Dongshan Pavilion of the Song period, now known as the Ancient Shou Lou Platform, was located on Ximen Street. The configuration of two mountains, two rivers, the surrounding walls, the irregular moat contour, and the checkerboard street layout were preserved, maintaining the Song period's architectural essence.

In the Ming period, famed general Qi Jiguang, alongside Governor Tan Lun, fortified and raised the walls to bolster defences against Japanese pirates during his eight years stationed in Linhai. They also built thirteen two-story hollow watchtowers, significantly boosting the walls' defensive capabilities and shaping their present form. Qi Jiguang's subsequent assignment to the north to oversee the Great Wall's defenses brought the architectural and defensive techniques developed in Linhai to the northern frontier, influencing the construction and fortification of the Great Wall at locations such as Badaling and Mutianyu in Beijing, Huangya Pass in Tianjin, and Shanhai Pass in Hebei. Therefore, the city walls are considered a forerunner and reference for the Ming Great Wall in Beijing.

The barbican of the city walls was constructed in 1712 during the Qing period. The design and fortification of the walls incorporated unique adaptations for flood prevention, such as the special bastion design, "skylight" structure of the gates, and additional protective measures. The barbican was built in an arc shape, especially the water-facing bastions designed as semicircles, while the opposite side remained square. This feature is unique among Chinese city walls. The bastion structure, initially aimed at expanding the defensive range, was later modified to have a curved or sloped water-facing side to mitigate water flow impact, enhancing the structural stability.

=== Utilisation ===
Linhai's strategic location, marked by its formidable and majestic terrain, endowed it with significant military geographical value. Ming dynasty scholar Wang Shixing once remarked on the impregnability of the walled city, noting its location between rivers on the southwest and northwest sides, with steep cliffs resembling a wall to the sky, and only the southeast side being somewhat flat, further defended by lakes and moats, making it difficult to conquer. From the Tang to the Qing dynasties, during the era of cold weapons, the walled city endured 15 wars, most of which ended in victory for the defenders.

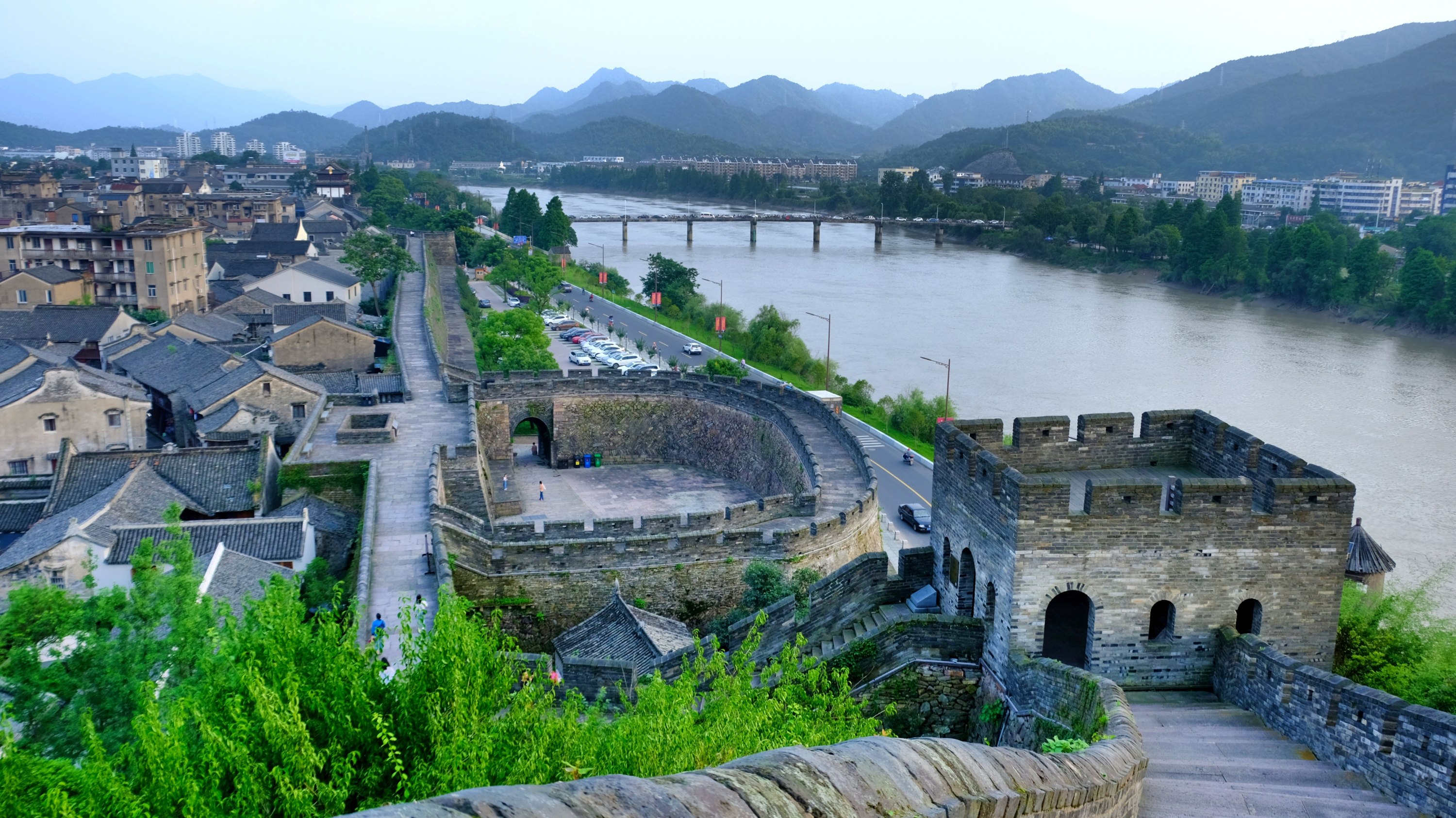
Waterfront of Taizhou Fu city wall

The city walls served not only a significant military purpose but also played a crucial role in flood control. Located at the point where the Ling River meets the sea, the city was frequently threatened by floods. Historical major floods, such as those during the Southern Song and Qing dynasties, caused severe damage to the city. The sections of the city wall along the river, including the Chaotian Gate and the barbican, especially during typhoons and the rainy season, acted as critical flood barriers.

In May 2016, a portion of the barbican near the Zhenning Gate of the Taizhou city walls collapsed, affecting an area about 10 meters wide and five to six meters high. The collapse formed a slope of bricks and stones, revealing the rammed earth structure inside. The stone plaque on the wall still retained the character for "Ning," while the character for "Zhen" had fallen to the ground. The area of collapse was relatively small, and it was expected that restoration work could well recover the original appearance of the wall. On the early morning of August 10, 2019, the super typhoon "Lekima" made landfall in Taizhou, Zhejiang, causing severe flooding. The base of the Taizhou city walls was submerged; however, due to the protection of the walls, the buildings within the city did not collapse.

=== Protection ===
As early as 1990, the Linhai municipal government proposed nominating the Taizhou city walls for World Cultural Heritage status and conducted preliminary research. In 1994, Linhai was awarded the title of National Historic and Cultural City. In August 1995, Linhai held a mobilisation meeting aimed at restoring the ancient city walls, encouraging citizens to participate in the campaign to restore the city wall. The restoration of the city walls began in 1995 and was completed in October 2000.

On August 29, 1997, the Taizhou city walls were designated as a Zhejiang Provincial Level Cultural Heritage Site, and on June 25, 2001, they were upgraded to a National Key Cultural Heritage Site. In 2003, a specialised committee for the protection and development of the Taizhou city walls was established. In 2006, cities like Nanjing and Xi'an began to jointly nominate "Ming and Qing Dynasties City Walls of China" for World Cultural Heritage. In August 2009, the Linhai City Committee and Municipal Government decided to formally initiate the nomination process, planning to join the "City Walls of the Ming and Qing Dynasties" group and submit an application to the World Cultural Heritage tentative list.

From January 1, 2018, Taizhou implemented the "Taizhou Fu City Wall Protection Regulation", the first local legislation in Taizhou to protect cultural heritage formally and the third ordinance enacted after two other regulations. This regulation specifically designated May 10th as "Taizhou City Walls Protection Day," commemorating the victory of Qi's army over the Japanese pirates at Huajie outside the city walls, hence honouring the valour of Qi's army in the struggle against piracy.

In the 2020s, the municipal government invested nearly 60 million Chinese yuan in the restoration of the Taizhou city walls and revised the "Taizhou Fu City Wall Protection Regulation", aiming to promote the nomination of the Taizhou city walls as a World Cultural Heritage Site. On July 15, 2022, the Ministry of Culture and Tourism announced the Taizhou Fu cultural tourism area as a national 5A-level tourist attraction, making it the 20th tourist attraction in Zhejiang Province to receive this honour.

== Within the city ==
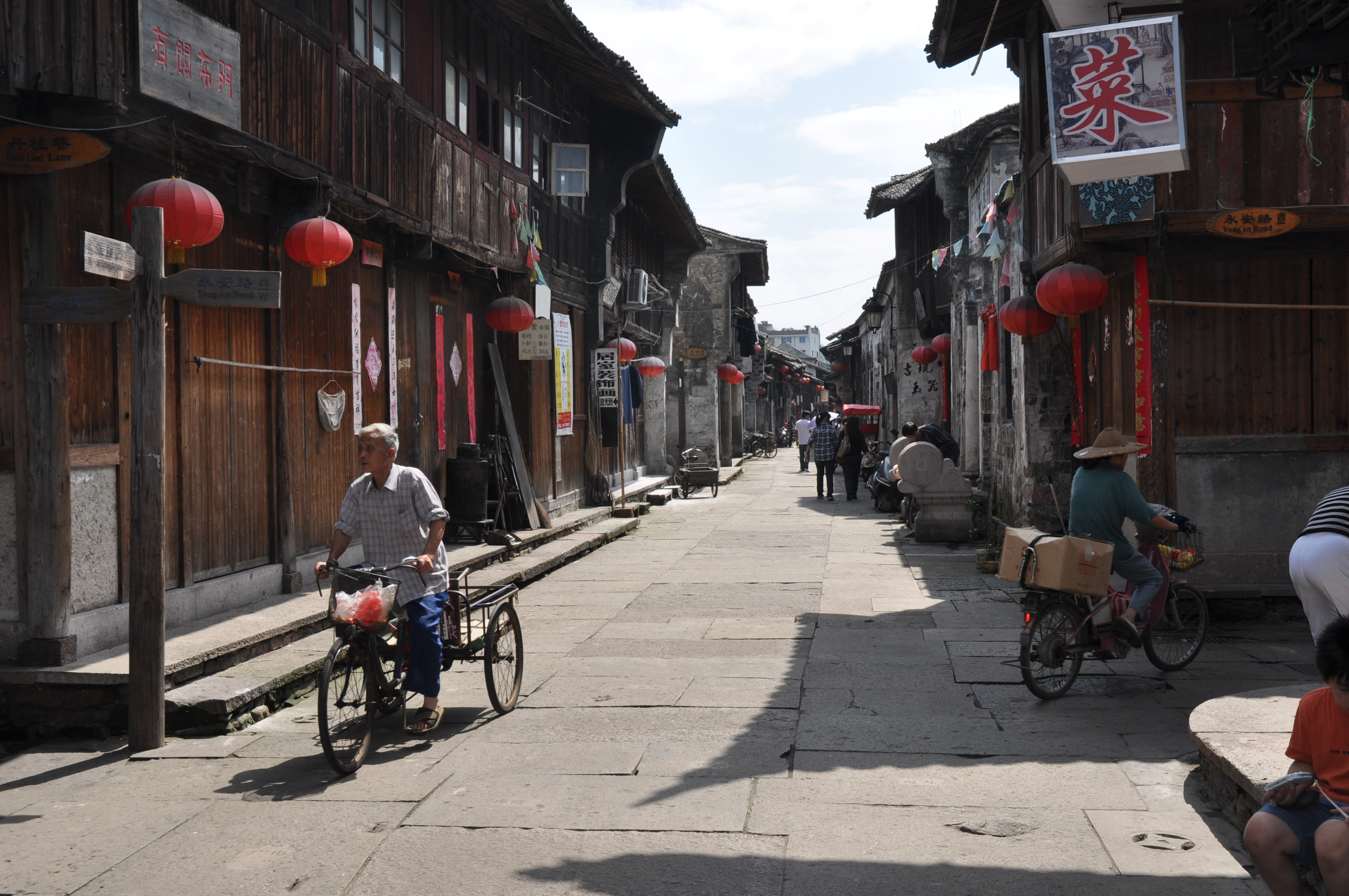
Ziyang Street in 2010

Taizhou Fu is known for its vibrant daily markets within its 3.12 square kilometers. The main streets, arranged in three vertical and three horizontal lines, extend into more than 50 alleys, housing 28,000 residents.

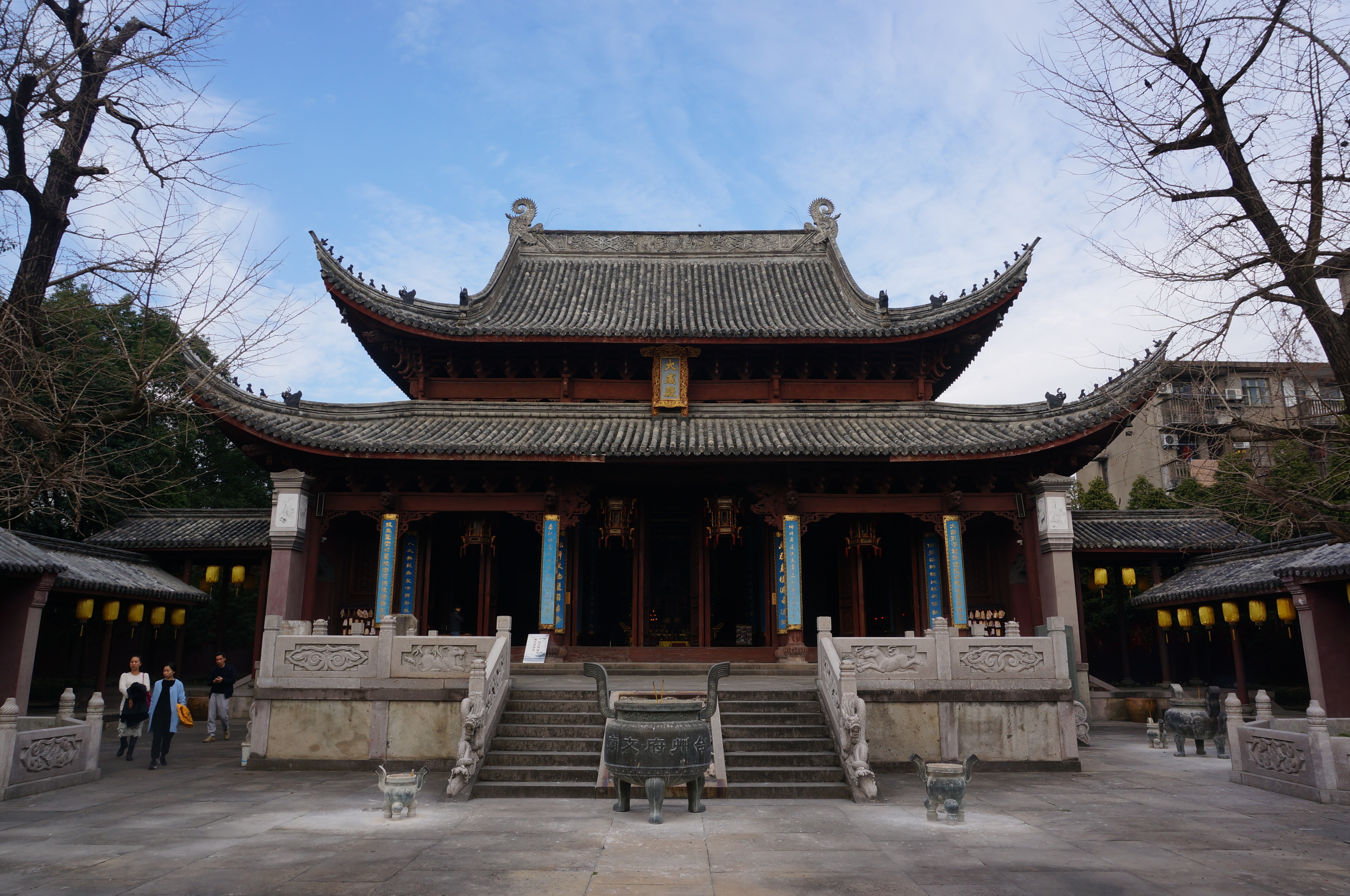
Taizhou Fu Confucian Temple on Ziyang Street

Ziyang Street, established during the Three Kingdoms period, serves as the central axis of the walled city, stretching approximately 1080 meters. This street has been meticulously preserved, maintaining its old cobblestone paths. Along the street are various historical museums, such as the Zhang Xiujuan Papercutting Art Museum and the Clock and Watch Science Museum, showcasing a rich cultural heritage. The shops on Ziyang Street typically have the business on the ground floor and the shopkeeper's residence above. According to the Linhai City Culture and Tourism Group, Ziyang Street features a diverse range of commercial activities. Currently, about 60% of the shops are business-oriented, with 25% being traditional cultural shops and 35% representing new, youthful ventures. Fifteen themed museums, twelve intangible cultural heritage exhibition halls, and over sixty traditional shops have been preserved in the city.

Since September 2004, the Linhai municipal government has undertaken protective restoration of Ziyang Street to ensure the preservation of its historical character. During this process, only a few residents chose to relocate, and no high-rise buildings were constructed on the old street. Fifteen themed museums, twelve intangible cultural heritage exhibition halls, and over sixty traditional shops remain in the city. In the Ziyang Street commercial area, there are now more than 1,100 shops. Between 2020 and 2023, foot traffic and shop revenue increased fivefold and doubled, respectively.

== Gardens ==
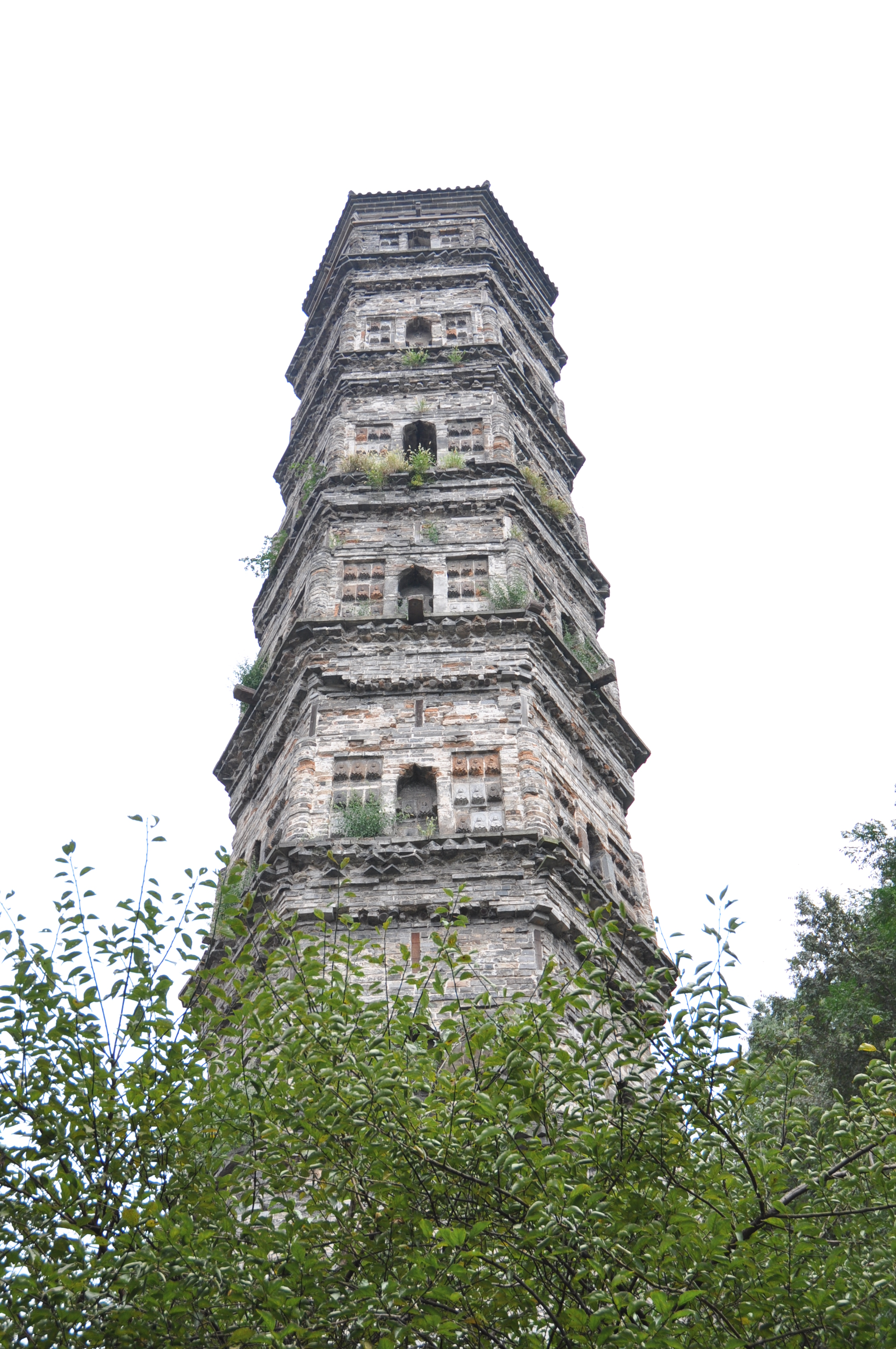
Jinshan Towers

The walled city is home to numerous garden attractions, among which Jinshan and East Lake are particularly renowned. In the northwest part of the city, Longgu Mountain has recently seen the opening of Guangwen Park, complementing the Zheng Guangwen Memorial Hall.

=== Jinshan ===
Jinshan, also known as Jinzi Mountain, is located in the southeast corner of the city, standing approximately 100 meters tall and adjoining Xiao Gu Mountain to the east. The mountain features two peaks facing each other with a valley in between, resembling a headscarf, hence its name, which is inspired by the legend of Emperor Hua ascending to heaven and his hat falling to this spot. The mountain is lush with ancient trees, and temples and pavilions are scattered throughout. Climbing the mountain offers views of the entire city to the north, the distant suburbs to the south, and a bird's-eye view of the Ling River, making it a popular spot for leisure and daily exercise among citizens. Two towers stand on the peaks at the top of the mountain, with the Nan Shan Temple Tower on the western slope and the Tian Ning Temple Tower at the northwest foot, together creating a unique landscape of towers. Since the Jin and Tang dynasties, Jinshan has been a famous site, once hosting nearly 40 palace and temple buildings and celebrated as "the best place for sightseeing in the county." The newly built Shuangze Pavilion in the mountains and the Buweng Pavilion on the west side of the ridge commemorate the Tang dynasty poet Gu Kuang.

=== East Lake ===
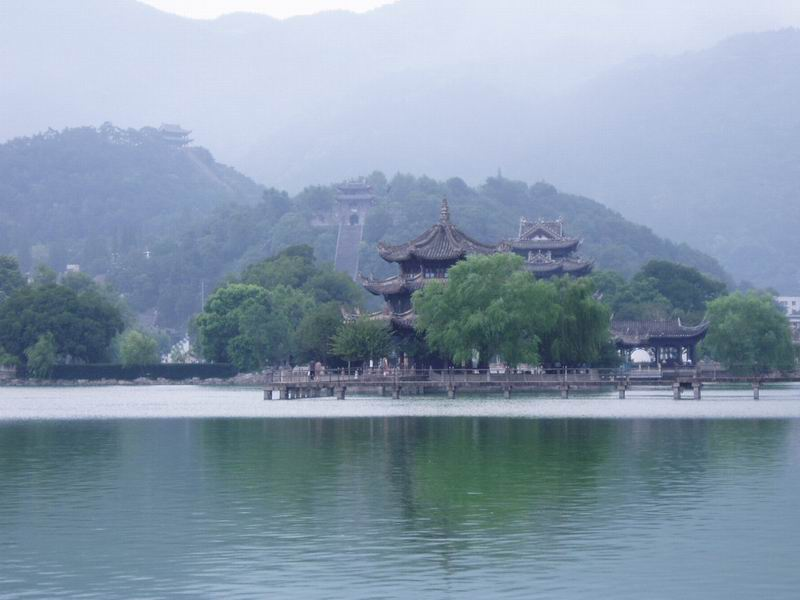
East Lake of Taizhou Fu

East Lake, located on the eastern side of the city, is named for its position. It was originally the confluence of Baiyun Mountain to the north of the city and Shangong Stream, flowing south into the Ling River. During the Song dynasty, Governor Zhang Wei built a shipyard here and stationed a naval force. Later, Governor Qian Xuan transformed it into a lake, which has been expanded since then. The lake is rectangular, approximately 500 meters long from north to south and 150 meters wide from east to west. It underwent major restoration in 1985. The main attractions of the lake area are centered around the water, with the surrounding mountains enhancing its beauty. A cross-dam divides the lake into a front lake and a back lake, with another dam built from the middle of the cross-dam to the north, dividing the back lake into the east back lake and the west back lake. At the intersection of the two dams lies a small island lush with trees. The Qiaoyun Pavilion, built in the Qing dynasty, was abandoned in 1974, and its site is now used for cultural activities. Three new pavilions have been added to the lake, enhancing its charm. The Huxin Pavilion on the small island in the center of the front lake is an ideal spot for sightseeing. The longitudinal dam on the back lake houses the Fengyuan Pavilion, with a Fengyuan Bridge built on both the south and north sides of the pavilion. The island on the north side of the back lake has been developed into a children's park. The martyr's cemetery is located at the foot of the northern mountain, surrounded by pine and cypress trees. Along the western shore of the lake, new sports and cultural facilities have been constructed.

== Tourism ==
Since 2016, significant efforts have been made to improve the living conditions of the original residents within the walled city, with more than 3 billion yuan invested, propelling Linhai city to attain a 5A-level tourist attraction status. The development of the walled city has led to the hosting of several cultural and tourism events such as the CCTV New Year's Eve Gala, Zhu Ziqing Literature Week, Chinese Folk Cooking Competition, and the Chaigutang Cross-country Race, simultaneously promoting the tourism brand "Millennium Taizhou Fu, the True Song City in the South of the Yangtze River". By September 9, 2023, the Taizhou Fu cultural tourism area had welcomed over 10 million visitors in a single year for the first time, setting a new record.

In 2023, the walled city launched the "Old Brands of Taizhou Fu" revival plan and established the nation's first fund dedicated to young entrepreneurs in cultural and tourism ventures. This initiative also saw the formation of the Taizhou Fu Young Entrepreneurs Alliance and the solicitation of business proposals for 20 state-owned properties to attract entrepreneurs. During the Spring Festival period of 2023, the Taizhou Fu cultural tourism area attracted 712,600 visitors, ranking second among ancient city and town category 5A tourist attractions nationwide according to the National Ministry of Culture and Tourism, just behind Lijiang.

To further enhance the visitor experience, the city plans to implement a series of new measures. These include creating a dispersed, point-based business layout to encourage visitors to explore every corner of the 3.14 square kilometers scenic area, thereby expanding the active area of the city. Additionally, new initiatives such as night tours of East Lake and immersive experiences at Zhuangyuan Building are being introduced, along with the implementation of the old brand revival plan.

== See also ==
- Linhai, Taizhou
