= Taizhou =

Dark green: Taizhou, Jiangsu Light green: Taizhou, Zhejiang

Taizhou may refer to either of two cities in eastern China:

- Taizhou, Jiangsu (泰州; Tàizhōu), a city in Jiangsu Province, China
- Taizhou, Zhejiang (台州; Tāizhōu), a city in Zhejiang Province, China

== See also ==
- Taizhou dialect
- Taizhou Airport (disambiguation)
