= Yilida =

Zhejiang Yilida Ventilator Co. Ltd
- Type: Public
- Traded as: (SZSE: 002686)
- Industry: Equipment Manufacturer
- Founded: 1994
- Headquarters: Taizhou, China
- Products: HVAC Fans
- Revenue: $140 million (2014)
- Number of employees: 2000 (2012)

Yilida headquartered in Taizhou, Zhejiang, China is a world-wide supplier of fans, motors and accessories to the HVAC industry. Yilida is listed on Shenzhen Stock Exchange (SZSE: 002686), in China since July 2, 2012.

== History ==
Yilida (SZSE: 002686) was founded in 1994 in Taizhou, Zhejiang province.

== Locations ==
Yilida has manufacturing facilities in Taizhou, Guangzhou, and Tianjin, and sales offices in over 30 cities in China.

== Markets ==
Yilida's products are used in Fan Coil Units, Air Handling Units, Building Ventilations, and Metro and tunnel ventilations.

== Recent Acquisition ==
- In December 2012, Yilida announced the acquisition of Fulihua, an axial fan company located in Suzhou, China.
- In August 2014, Yilida announced the acquisition of the majority shareholding of Zhejiang MaEr Fan Co., Ltd. a fan company that specializes in the external rotor motor fans.

With both acquisitions, Yilida expanded its product lines to cover internal rotor and external rotor axial fans for the HVAC industry.
