= Ruyi Bridge =

Glass bottom bridge in China

Ruyi Bridge 如意桥 Rúyì qiáo
- Ruyi Bridge
- Coordinates: 28°41′08″N 120°36′17″E
- Crosses: Shenxianju Valley
- Named for: Ruyi

Characteristics
- Material: Steel
- Trough construction: Glass
- Total length: 100 m (330 ft)
- Height: 140 m (460 ft)
- No. of spans: 3

History
- Designer: He Yunchang
- Construction start: 2017
- Construction end: 2020
- Opened: September 2020

Location
- Interactive map of Ruyi Bridge

Ruyi Bridge (Chinese: 如意桥 Rúyì qiáo) is a footbridge in Taizhou, Zhejiang, China, made up of three bridges. It is a pedestrian bridge which was built to cross the Shenxianju Valley and it features a glass-bottomed walkway. The unusual curved walkways are designed to look like a Chinese ruyi.

== Background ==
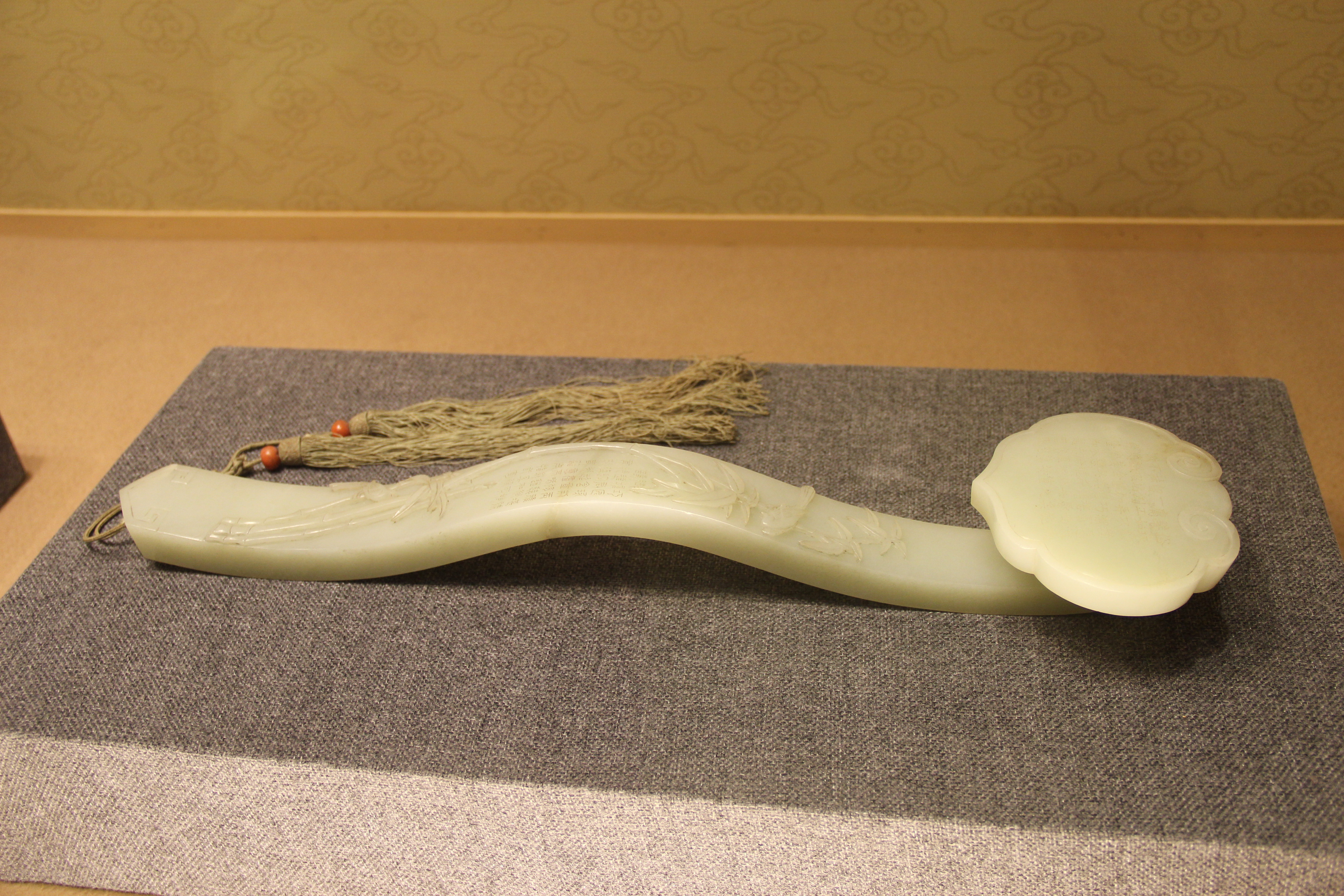
The bridge is said to resemble a jade ruyi like the one pictured here

Planning for the bridge began in 2017. The bridge was opened in September 2020 and was visited by 200,000 people by November 2020. Ruyi Bridge was designed by structural steel expert, He Yunchang and made to resemble jade ruyi, which is a Chinese symbol for good fortune. It is a two-level 100 m-long (330 ft) glass bridge which is 140 m (460 ft) above the ground. The bridge was built to be a tourist attraction, spanning the Shenxianju Valley, and is one of China's 2000 glass bottom bridges. It is the major attraction spanning the west canyons of Shenxianju, in the Shenxianju Scenic Area.

In 2020, Canadian astronaut Chris Hadfield uploaded a drone video of the bridge to Twitter which went viral. The video carried the caption: "I'd want better handrails". Many viewers doubted that the bridge was real; Snopes later carried out an investigation and determined that it was indeed real and not a deepfake.

== Design ==
The bridge is wavy and has three separate footpaths, portions of which have a glass bottom. The design has been described as three undulating bridges meant to blend in with the natural scenery. Madeleine Grey of The Sydney Morning Herald described the bridge's appearance as a "mix between DNA strand and a futuristic Eye of Sauron."

The bridge designer He Yunchang is the same structural engineer who was involved in the design of the "Bird's Nest," a stadium used for the 2008 Olympic Games in Beijing.
