= Taizhou University (Zhejiang) =

University in Taizhou, Zhejiang, China

- 台州学院
- Type: Public university
- Established: 1907
- President: Gong Jianli
- Academic staff: 200
- Administrative staff: 800
- Undergraduates: 7,000
- Location: Taizhou, Zhejiang, China
- Campus: Urban area
- Colours
- Website: www.tzc.edu.cn

Taizhou University
- Simplified Chinese: 台州学院
- Traditional Chinese: 台州學院
Transcriptions
Standard Mandarin
- Hanyu Pinyin: Táizhōu Xuéyuàn

Taizhou University (TU; simplified Chinese: 台州学院; traditional Chinese: 台州學院; pinyin: Tái zhōuxué yuàn) is a comprehensive public university based in Taizhou city, Zhejiang province, China.

== History ==
Taizhou University was established in Linhai, Taizhou prefecture, Zhejiang province in 1907 and has undergone several organization restructures.

== Campus locations ==
TZU has three campuses. The main campus is in Linhai and has a floor space of 230,000 square meters. A secondary, smaller campus is also in Linhai, next to the famous Linhai Old Street and across from the Great Wall. The third campus is in the Jiaojiang District, another region of Taizhou County, and covers an area of more than 800,000 square meters.

== Administration ==
=== Schools and departments ===
There are 12 departments or colleges at the university.

- School of Humanities and social sciences
- School of Economy and Trade Management
- School of Foreign Languages
- School of Information and Electronics Engineering
- School of Bioscience and Medical Chemistry
- School of Physical Education
- School of Medical
- School of Adult Education
- School of Mathematics
- School of Machine and electronics
- School of Architecture
