= Taizhou Airport =

Taizhou Airport may refer to:

- Taizhou Luqiao Airport, serving Taizhou in Zhejiang, China
- Yangzhou Taizhou International Airport, serving Yangzhou and Taizhou in Jiangsu, China
