= Taizhou, Zhejiang =

City in Zhejiang, China

Taizhou 台州市 Taichow
- Prefecture-level city
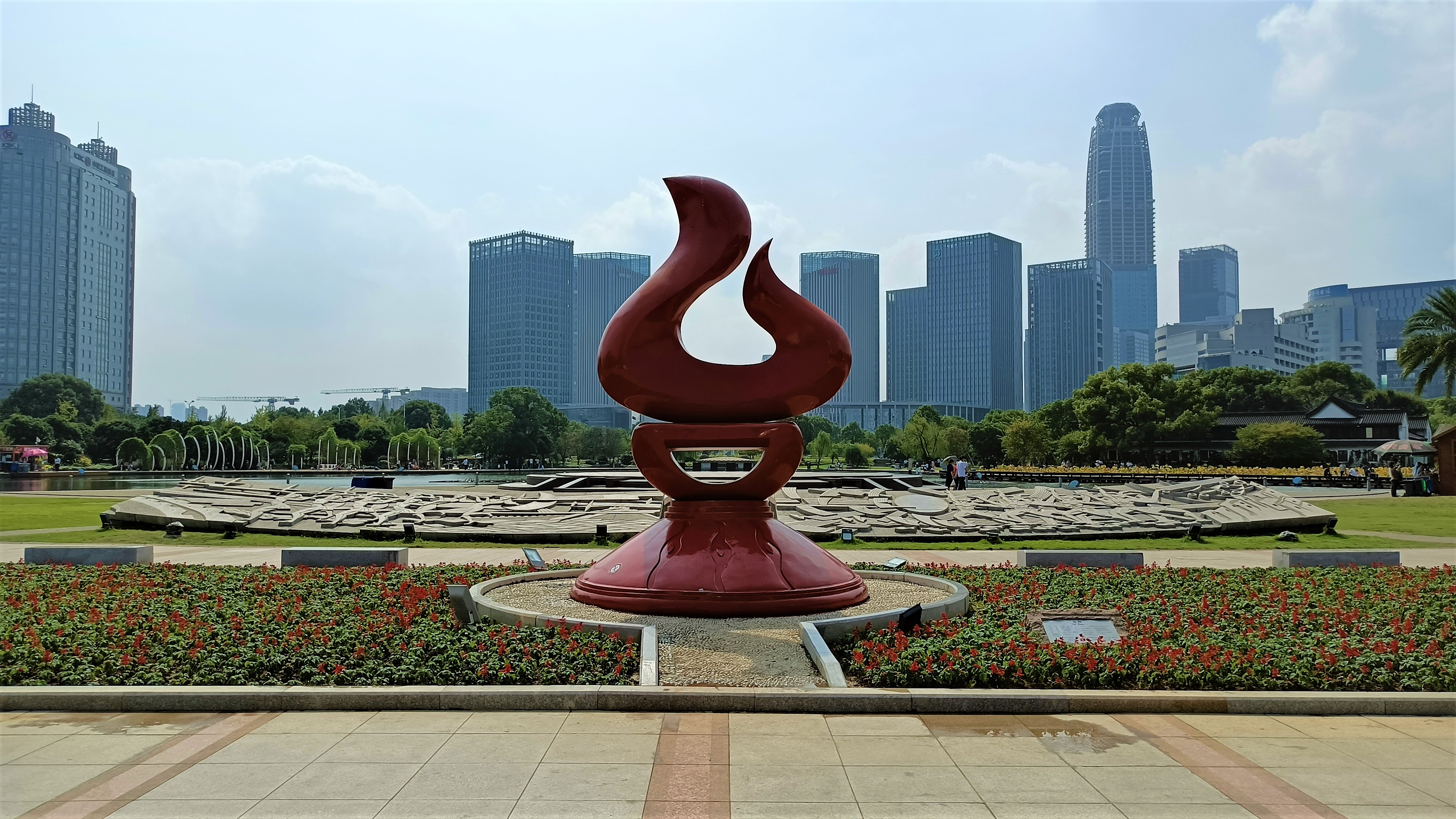
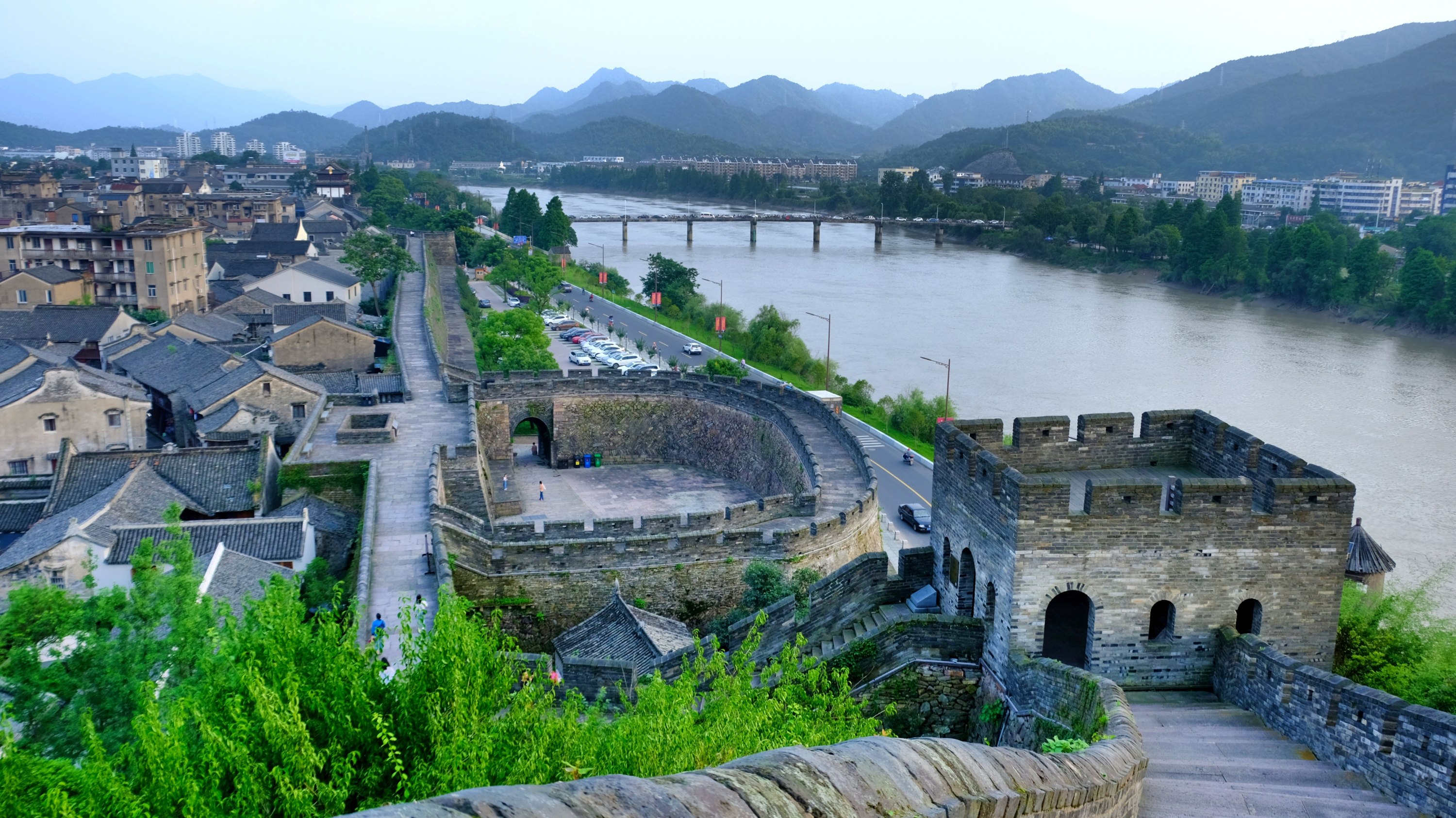
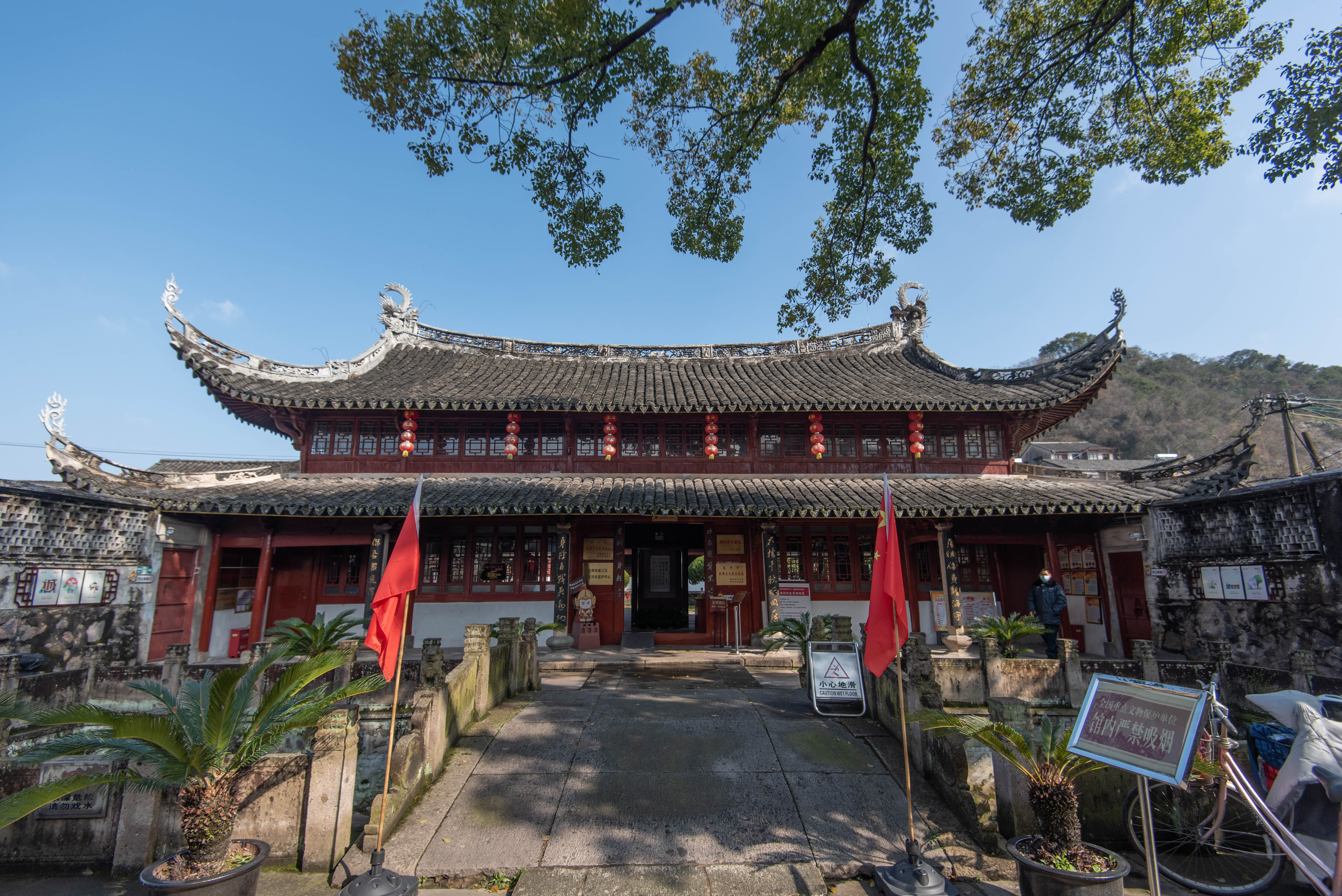
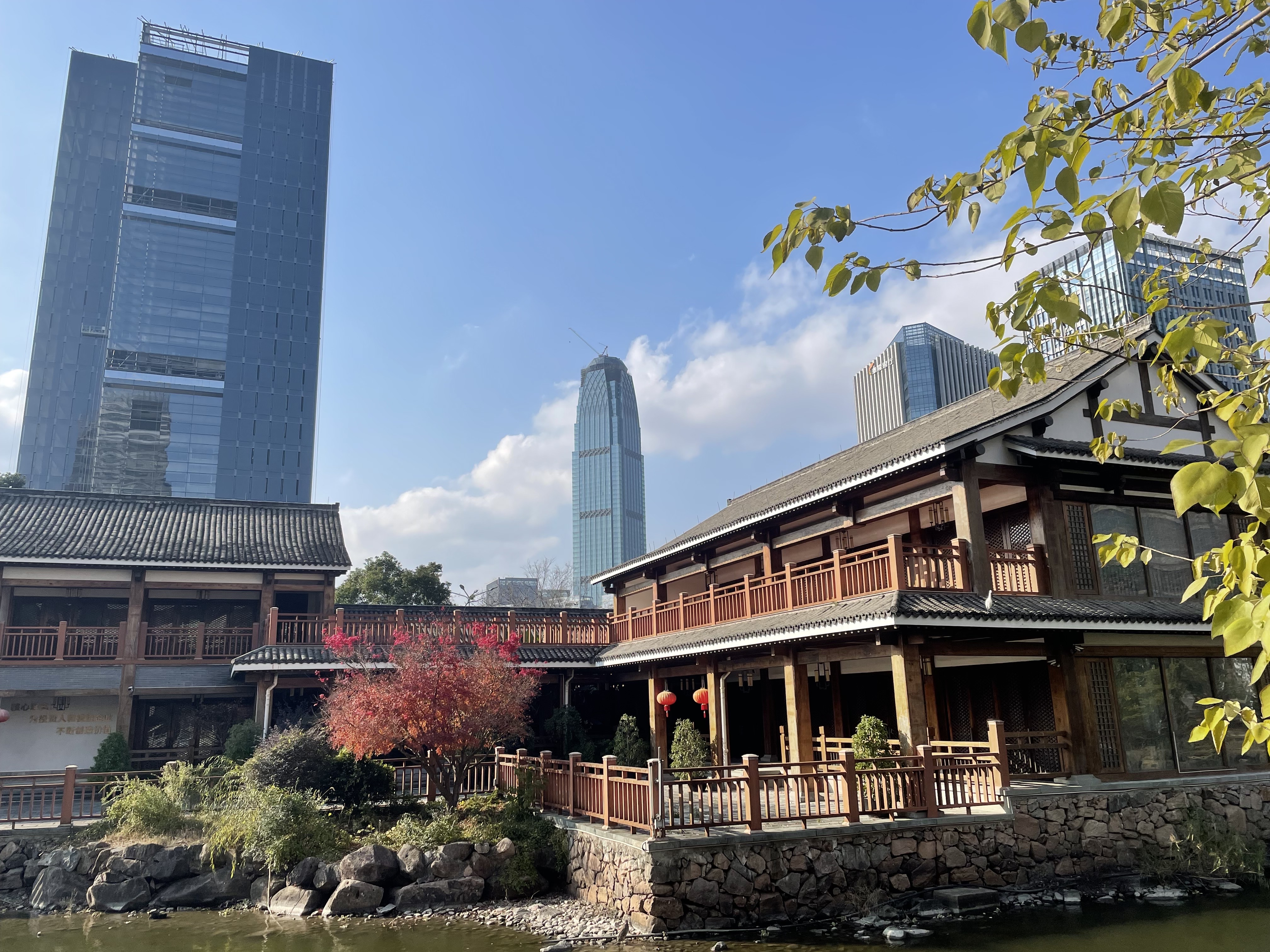
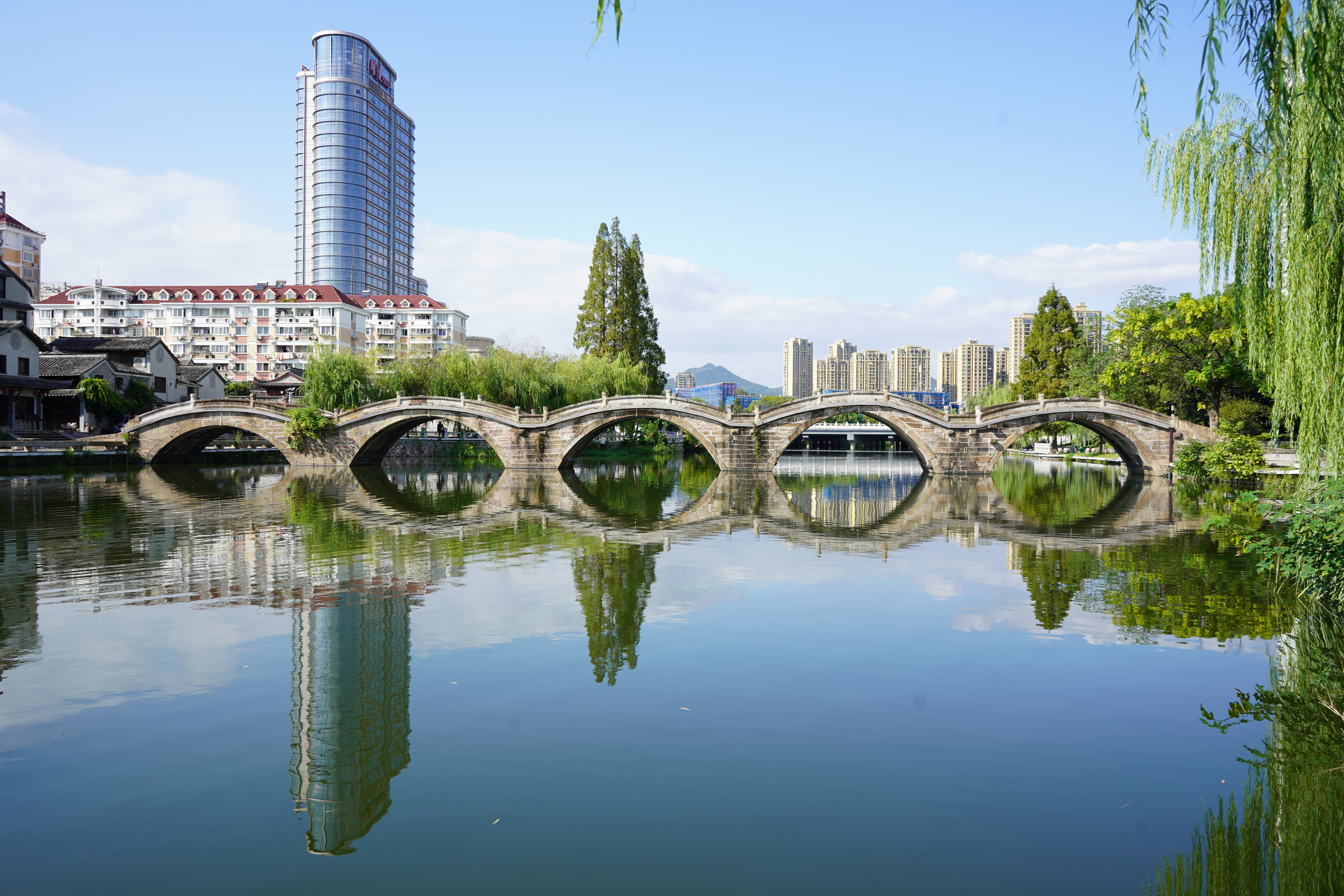
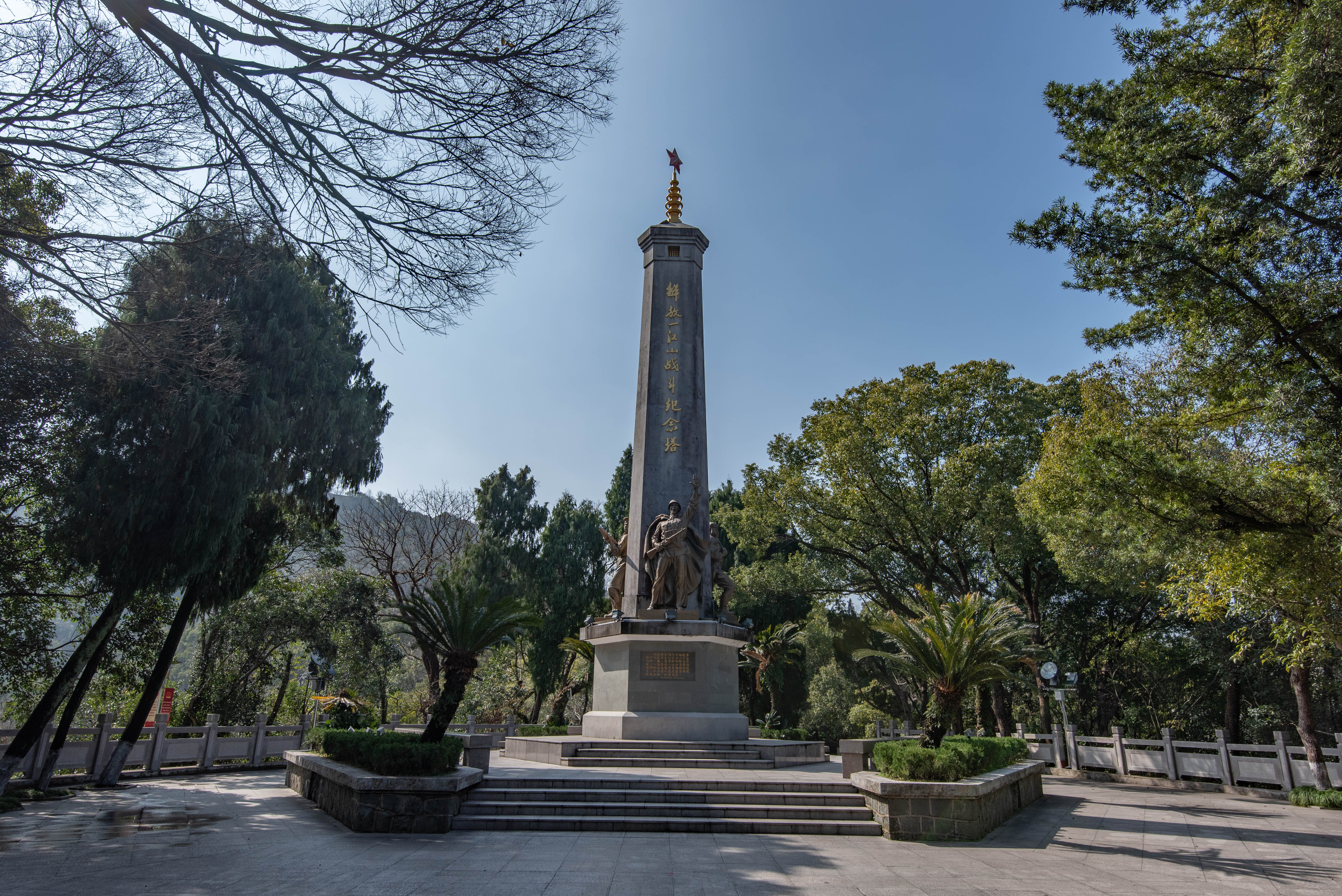
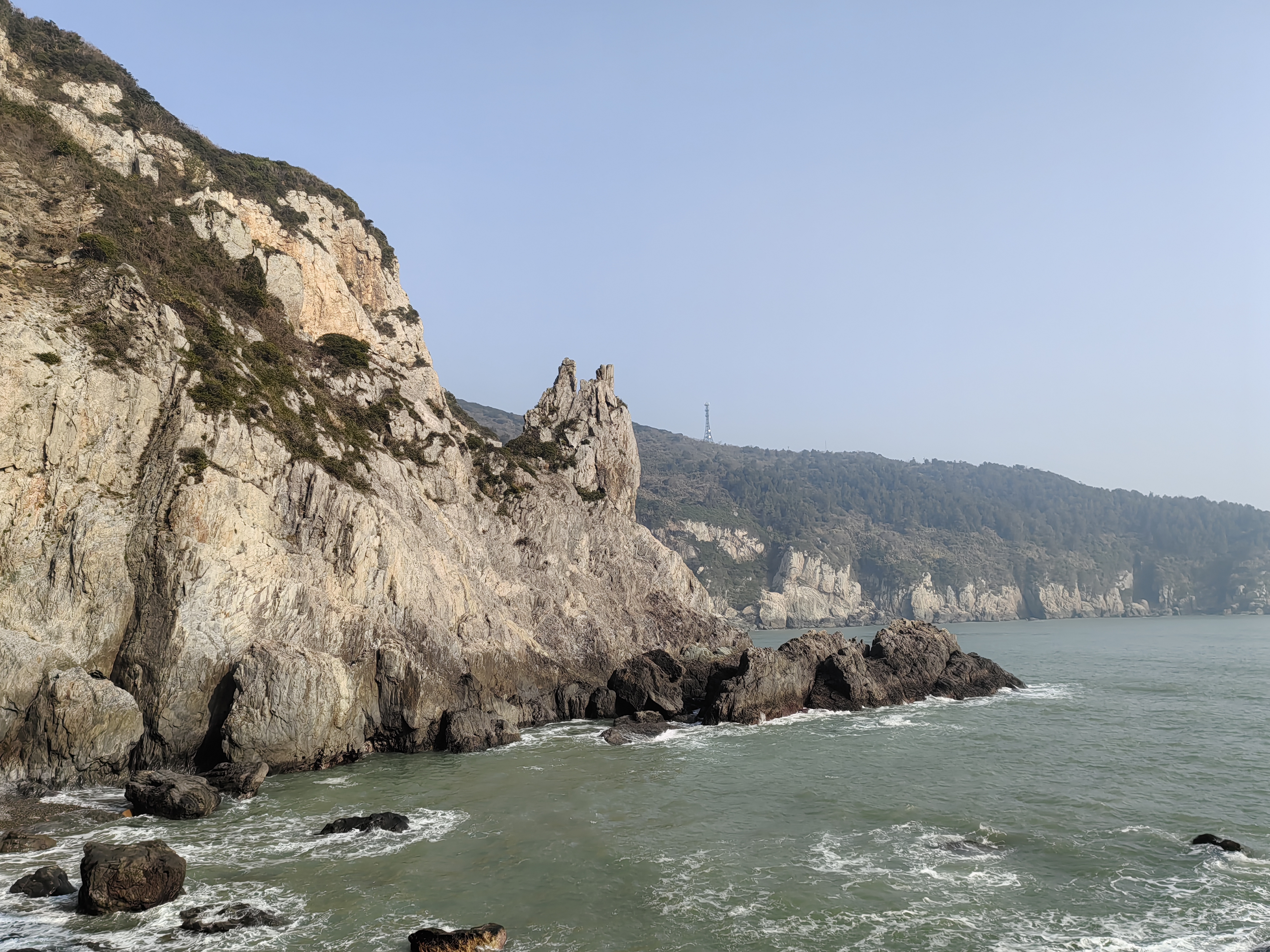
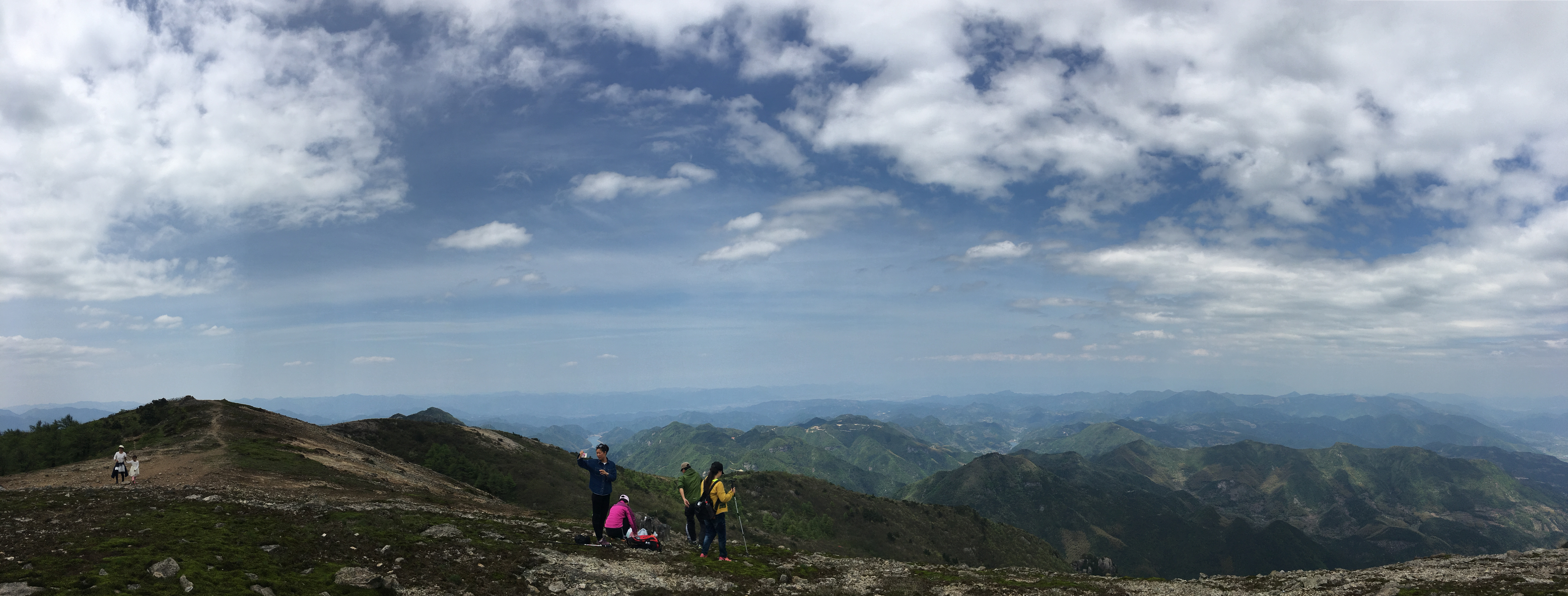
- Taizhou People's Square Walled City of Taizhou Fu and Ling River in Linhai Memorial Temple of Qi Jiguang Central Business District in Jiazhi Wudong Bridge in Huangyan District Martyr's Monument in Yijiangshan Islands Dachen Islands Tiantai Mountain

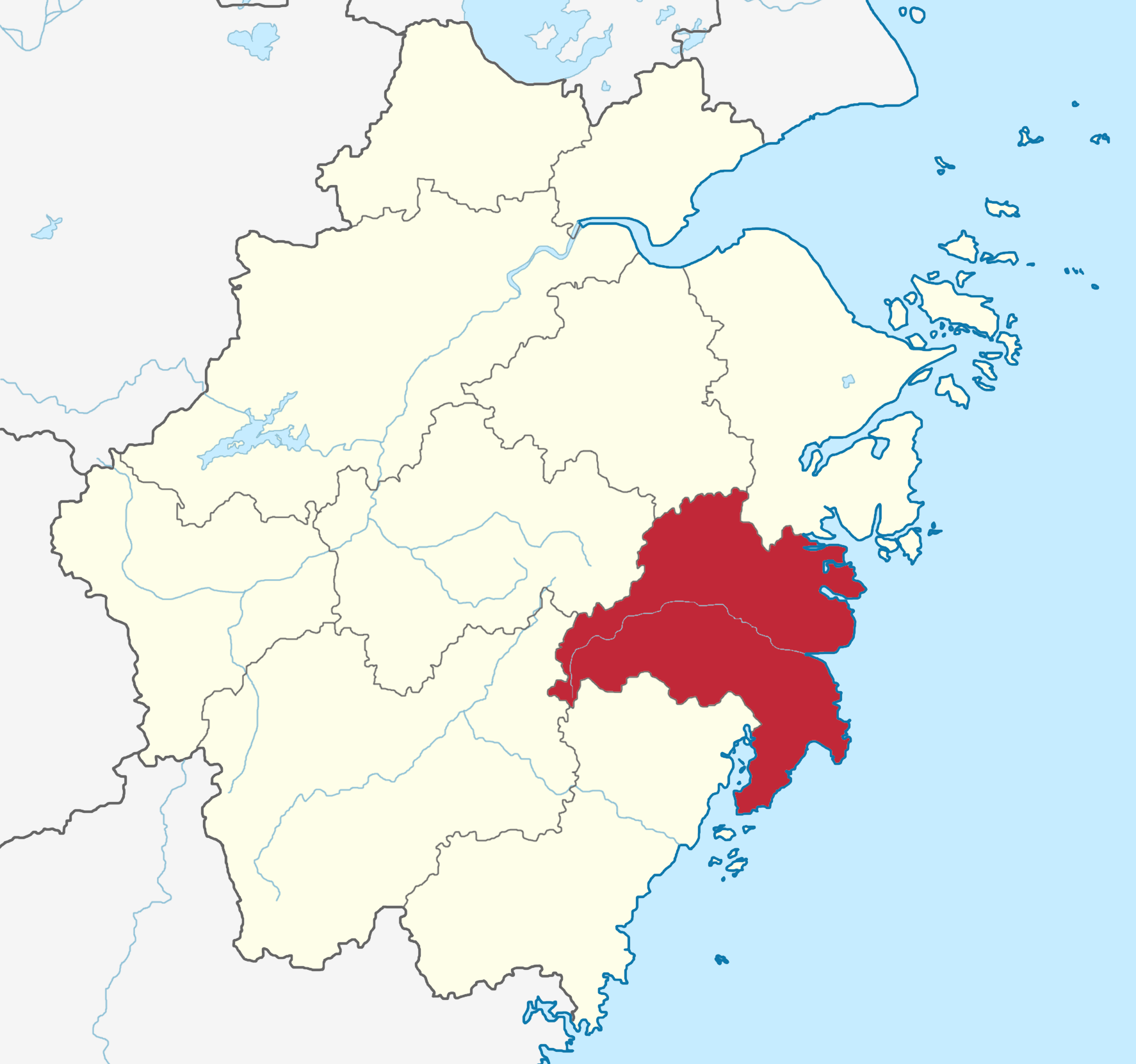

- Location in China Taizhou (China)
- Coordinates (Taizhou municipal government): 28°39′21″N 121°25′15″E
- Country: People's Republic of China
- Province: Zhejiang
- County-level divisions: 9
- Municipal seat: Jiaojiang District

Government
  - CPC Secretary: Li Yueqi (李跃旗)
  - Mayor: Wu Xiaodong (吴晓东)

Area
  - Prefecture-level city: 9,411 km^{2} (3,634 sq mi)
  - Land: 9,411 km^{2} (3,634 sq mi)
  - Urban: 1,536 km^{2} (593 sq mi)
  - Metro: 2,372 km^{2} (916 sq mi)
- Highest elevation: 1,382 m (4,534 ft)
- Lowest elevation: 0 m (0 ft)

Population (2020 census)
  - Prefecture-level city: 6,662,888
  - Density: 708.0/km^{2} (1,834/sq mi)
  - Urban: 2,162,461
  - Urban density: 1,408/km^{2} (3,646/sq mi)
  - Metro: 3,578,660
  - Metro density: 1,509/km^{2} (3,908/sq mi)

GDP
  - Prefecture-level city: CN¥ 526.3 billion US$ 73.7 billion
  - Per capita: CN¥ 79,889; US$ 12,020
- Time zone: UTC+8 (China Standard)
- Postal code: 318000, 317000
- Area code: 576
- ISO 3166 code: CN-ZJ-10
- License Plate Prefix: 浙J
- Website: www.zjtz.gov.cn en.zjtz.gov.cn taizhou.chinadaily.com.cn
- City trees Mei (Prunus mume), Camphor tree (Cinnamomum camphora)City flowers Sweet Osmanthus (Osmanthus fragrans) The Taizhou urban area commonly refer as the whole of Jiaojiang, Huayan, Luqiao districts and the metropolitan Taizhou includes Wenling City, citation is need for the original urban and metropolitan data.

Taizhou
- "Taizhou", as written in Chinese
- Chinese: 台州
- Hanyu Pinyin: PRC Standard Mandarin: Tāizhōu; ROC Standard Mandarin: Táizhōu
- Wu: T'e-tsiu (Taizhounese)
- Postal: Taichow
Transcriptions
Standard Mandarin
- Hanyu Pinyin: PRC Standard Mandarin: Tāizhōu; ROC Standard Mandarin: Táizhōu
- Bopomofo: PRC: ㄊㄞ ㄓㄡ; ROC: ㄊㄞˊ ㄓㄡ
- Gwoyeu Romatzyh: PRC: Taijou; ROC: Tairjou
- Wade–Giles: PRC: Tʻai^{1}-chou^{1} ROC: Tʻai^{2}-chou^{1}
- Tongyong Pinyin: PRC: Taijhou; ROC: Táijhou
- Yale Romanization: PRC: Tāijōu; ROC: Táijōu
- MPS2: PRC: Tāijōu; ROC: Táijōu
- IPA: PRC: [tʰáɪ.ʈʂóʊ] ROC: [tʰǎɪ.ʈʂóʊ]
Wu
- Romanization: T'e-tsiu (Taizhounese)

Taizhou (Note: pronunciation in PRC Standard Mandarin: [tʰáɪ.ʈʂóʊ]; Chinese: 台州; pinyin: Tāizhōu; Taizhou dialect: Thecieu; alternately known as Taichow) is a prefecture-level city located at the middle of the East China Sea coast of Zhejiang province. It is located 300 km (190 mi) south of Shanghai and 230 km (140 mi) southeast of Hangzhou, the provincial capital. It is bordered by Ningbo to the north, Wenzhou to the south, and Shaoxing, Jinhua, and Lishui to west. Taizhou includes 3 districts, 3 county-level cities, and 3 counties. As of the 2020 census, its total population was 6,662,888 inhabitants whom 3,578,660 lived in the built-up (or metro) area made of the three urban Districts and Wenling City now being largely conurbated.

== Etymology ==
Taizhou's name is believed to derive from nearby Mount Tiantai.

== History ==
Five thousand years ago, the ancestors of the modern inhabitants began to settle in this area. During the Xia, Shang, and Zhou dynasties, when the Chinese state was largely confined to the Yellow River basin, the area of present-day Taizhou was part of Dong'ou. Following the 3rd-century BC conquests of the Qin Empire, a settlement in the area was known as Huipu Town. It was initially included in the Minzhong Prefecture, but then moved to Kuaiji during the Han.

On August 22, 1994, Taizhou Municipality was set up in place of Taizhou Prefecture and approved by the State Council. In 1999, Taizhou was approved by the State Council to be a leading city in Zhejiang's urbanization structure and the center of sub zone of the first-class economy. Approved by the National Development and Reform Commission, Taizhou formally became one of the 16 cities of Yangtze River Delta area on August 15, 2003.

== Demographics ==
At the time of 2010 census, the whole population of Taizhou, including the whole prefecture-level city and subsidiary counties was 5,968,838 with 3,269,304 in the emerging built-up area made of 3 urban districts, Jiaojiang, Huangyan, Luqiao and Wenling City largely being urbanized.

== Administration ==
The prefecture-level city of Taizhou currently administers 3 districts, 3 county-level cities and 3 counties.

Map
| Name | Hanzi | Hanyu Pinyin | Taizhou Dialect |
|---|---|---|---|
| Jiaojiang District | 椒江区 | Jiāojiāng Qū | Ciaukaon Khiu |
| Huangyan District | 黄岩区 | Huángyán Qū | Wongniae khiu |
| Luqiao District | 路桥区 | Lùqiáo Qū | Lugiau khiu |
| Linhai City | 临海市 | Línhǎi Shì | Linhe Zy |
| Wenling City | 温岭市 | Wēnlǐng Shì | Uenling Zy |
| Yuhuan City | 玉环市 | Yùhuán Shì | Niohwae Zy |
| Sanmen County | 三门县 | Sānmén Xiàn | Saemen Yoe |
| Tiantai County | 天台县 | Tiāntāi Xiàn | Thiethai Yoe |
| Xianju County | 仙居县 | Xiānjū Xiàn | Shiekiu Yoe |

== Geography ==
At 651 kilometres (405 mi), Taizhou has a long coastline dotted with numerous islands; the largest one is Yuhuan Island in the south. Coastal areas in the east tend to flat, with an occasional hill. Eastern and northern parts of Taizhou are mountainous, with Yandangshan Mountains in the southwest, Kuocang Mountains (Chinese: 括苍山; pinyin: Kuòcāng Shān) in the west, and Mount Tiantai in the northwest. The highest point of Taizhou is Mishailang (Chinese: 米筛浪; pinyin: Mǐshāilàng), a 1,382.4 metres (4,535 ft) peak in the Kuocang Mountains, and also the highest point in the east of the Zhejiang Province.

=== Climate ===
Taizhou has a humid subtropical climate (Köppen Cfa) with four distinctive seasons. Occasionally struck by typhoons in the summers, the climate characterised by hot, humid summers and drier and cold winters with occasional snow. The mean annual temperature is 16.6 to 17.5 °C (61.9 to 63.5 °F) from north to south east coastal area, while mean annual rainfall ranges from 1,185 to 2,029 millimetres (46.7 to 79.9 in).

Climate data for Taizhou (Jiaojiang District), elevation 5 m (16 ft), (1991–2020 normals, extremes 1981–present)
| Month | Jan | Feb | Mar | Apr | May | Jun | Jul | Aug | Sep | Oct | Nov | Dec | Year |
|---|---|---|---|---|---|---|---|---|---|---|---|---|---|
| Record high °C (°F) | 24.9 (76.8) | 27.0 (80.6) | 29.9 (85.8) | 32.0 (89.6) | 33.7 (92.7) | 36.6 (97.9) | 41.0 (105.8) | 39.4 (102.9) | 36.2 (97.2) | 32.9 (91.2) | 29.8 (85.6) | 25.2 (77.4) | 41.0 (105.8) |
| Mean daily maximum °C (°F) | 11.4 (52.5) | 12.7 (54.9) | 15.9 (60.6) | 21.1 (70.0) | 25.4 (77.7) | 28.5 (83.3) | 32.8 (91.0) | 32.3 (90.1) | 29.0 (84.2) | 24.8 (76.6) | 19.7 (67.5) | 14.2 (57.6) | 22.3 (72.2) |
| Daily mean °C (°F) | 7.3 (45.1) | 8.4 (47.1) | 11.6 (52.9) | 16.6 (61.9) | 21.3 (70.3) | 24.8 (76.6) | 28.7 (83.7) | 28.4 (83.1) | 25.2 (77.4) | 20.5 (68.9) | 15.5 (59.9) | 9.8 (49.6) | 18.2 (64.7) |
| Mean daily minimum °C (°F) | 4.3 (39.7) | 5.4 (41.7) | 8.4 (47.1) | 13.2 (55.8) | 18.2 (64.8) | 22.2 (72.0) | 25.6 (78.1) | 25.5 (77.9) | 22.3 (72.1) | 17.3 (63.1) | 12.4 (54.3) | 6.6 (43.9) | 15.1 (59.2) |
| Record low °C (°F) | −6.3 (20.7) | −4.2 (24.4) | −5.4 (22.3) | 1.9 (35.4) | 8.6 (47.5) | 13.3 (55.9) | 18.4 (65.1) | 19.5 (67.1) | 13.3 (55.9) | 3.7 (38.7) | −0.5 (31.1) | −7.1 (19.2) | −7.1 (19.2) |
| Average precipitation mm (inches) | 72.0 (2.83) | 71.8 (2.83) | 128.5 (5.06) | 112.4 (4.43) | 147.7 (5.81) | 228.8 (9.01) | 149.8 (5.90) | 246.4 (9.70) | 189.2 (7.45) | 88.0 (3.46) | 78.0 (3.07) | 59.1 (2.33) | 1,571.7 (61.88) |
| Average precipitation days (≥ 0.1 mm) | 11.7 | 12.8 | 17.2 | 15.5 | 16.2 | 18.0 | 12.4 | 15.0 | 12.2 | 6.6 | 10.5 | 9.6 | 157.7 |
| Average snowy days | 1.8 | 1.2 | 0.4 | 0 | 0 | 0 | 0 | 0 | 0 | 0 | 0 | 0.6 | 4 |
| Average relative humidity (%) | 79 | 84 | 86 | 81 | 80 | 85 | 81 | 82 | 79 | 76 | 73 | 73 | 80 |
| Mean monthly sunshine hours | 102.9 | 96.3 | 113.0 | 129.7 | 132.7 | 111.9 | 217.8 | 209.6 | 161.4 | 163.9 | 118.1 | 122.3 | 1,679.6 |
| Percentage possible sunshine | 32 | 30 | 30 | 34 | 32 | 27 | 51 | 52 | 44 | 47 | 37 | 38 | 38 |
Source: China Meteorological Administration all-time extreme temperature

== Economy and industry ==
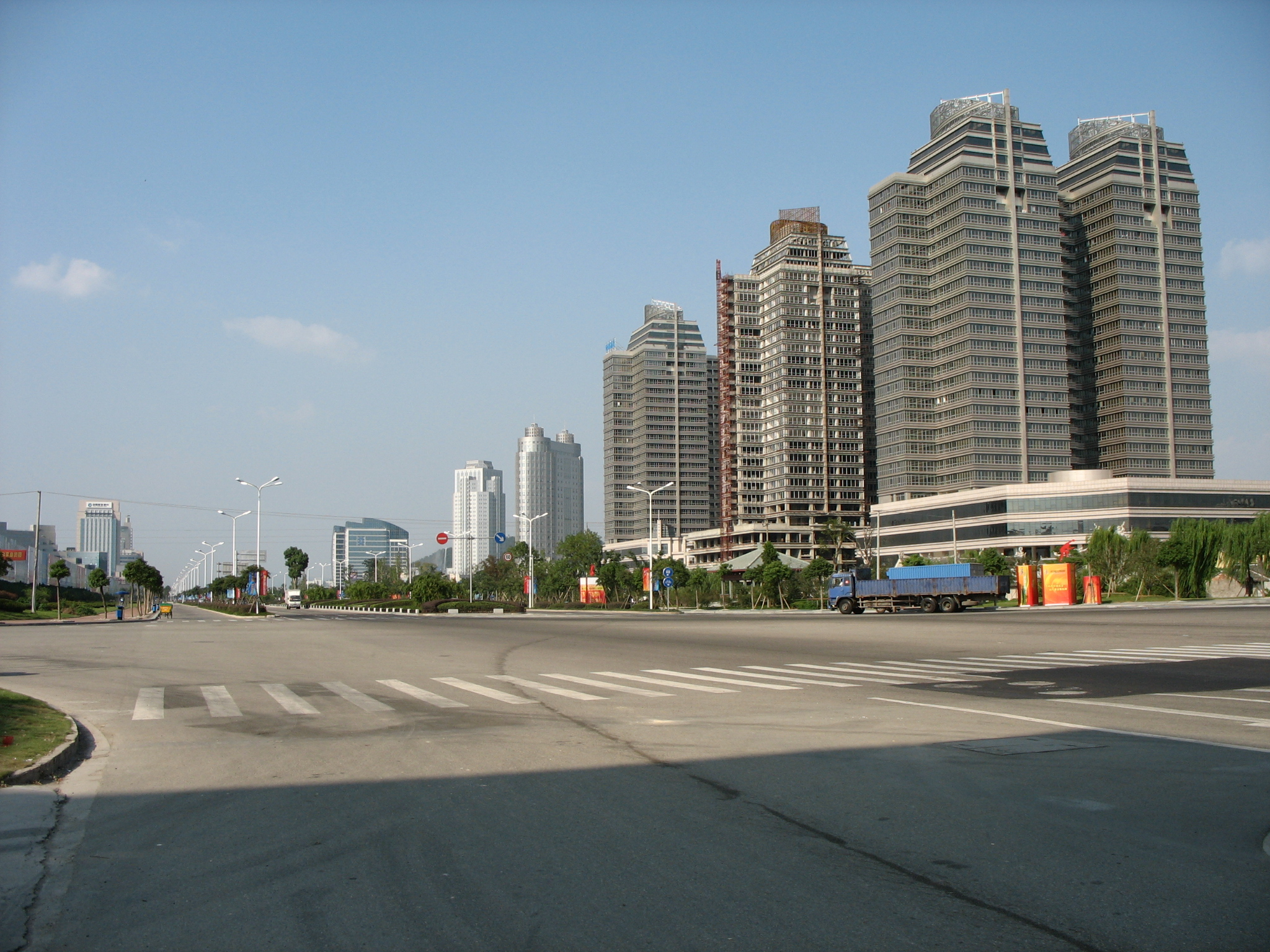
View down a street in Taizhou

Taizhou is one of the birthplaces of China's private economy in the early days of reform and opening up and is considered to the cradle of private enterprise in China. The term "Taizhou Model" refers to the city's economic development model induced by private sector initiatives along with local-government support. It is the 4th most populous, and the 4th largest industrial prefecture-level city in Zhejiang Province as of 2011.

Chinese automotive manufacturing company Geely was founded in Taizhou, which completed its acquisition of Volvo Cars in 2010. It is one of China's top ten automotive manufacturers.

Chinese auto parts manufacturer based Yuhuan a major auto parts manufacturer is also based in Taizhou.

The largest HVAC fan company Yilida is also located in Taizhou. It is listed on Shenzhen Stock Exchange (Stock #002686) and had acquired Fulihua fan company in Suzhou in 2012.

Taizhou is also one of the most important Mandarin, Loquat, Wendan (a kind of Pomelo), Myrica rubra producers in China. Other agricultural product include Rice, Canola, edible Wild rice stems or Zizania latifolia, Eddoe, Water chestnut, and Bamboo.

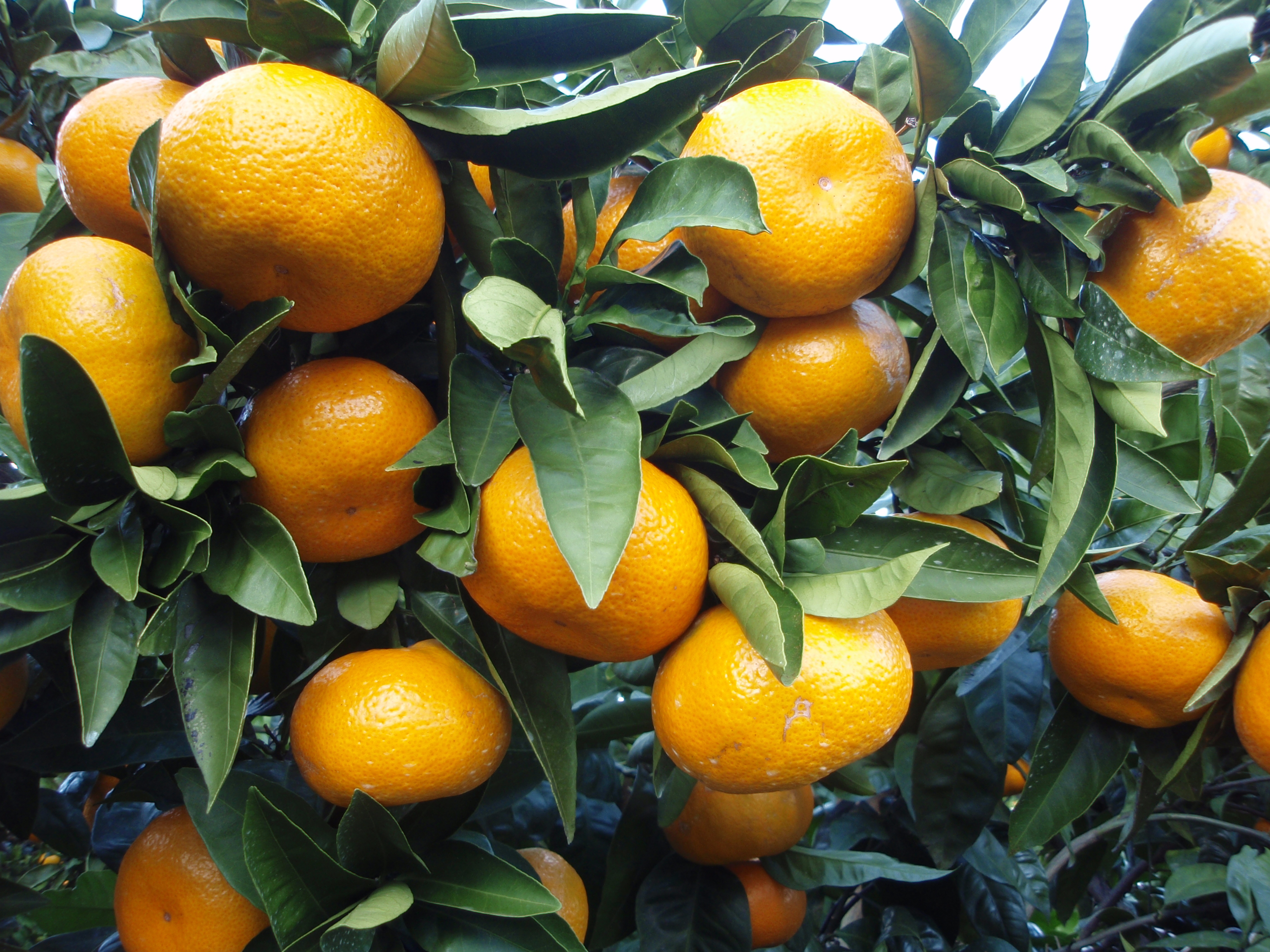
Mandarin

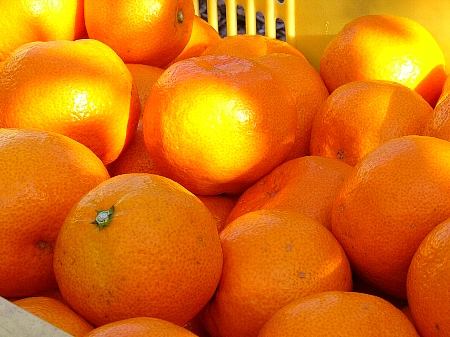
Mandarin

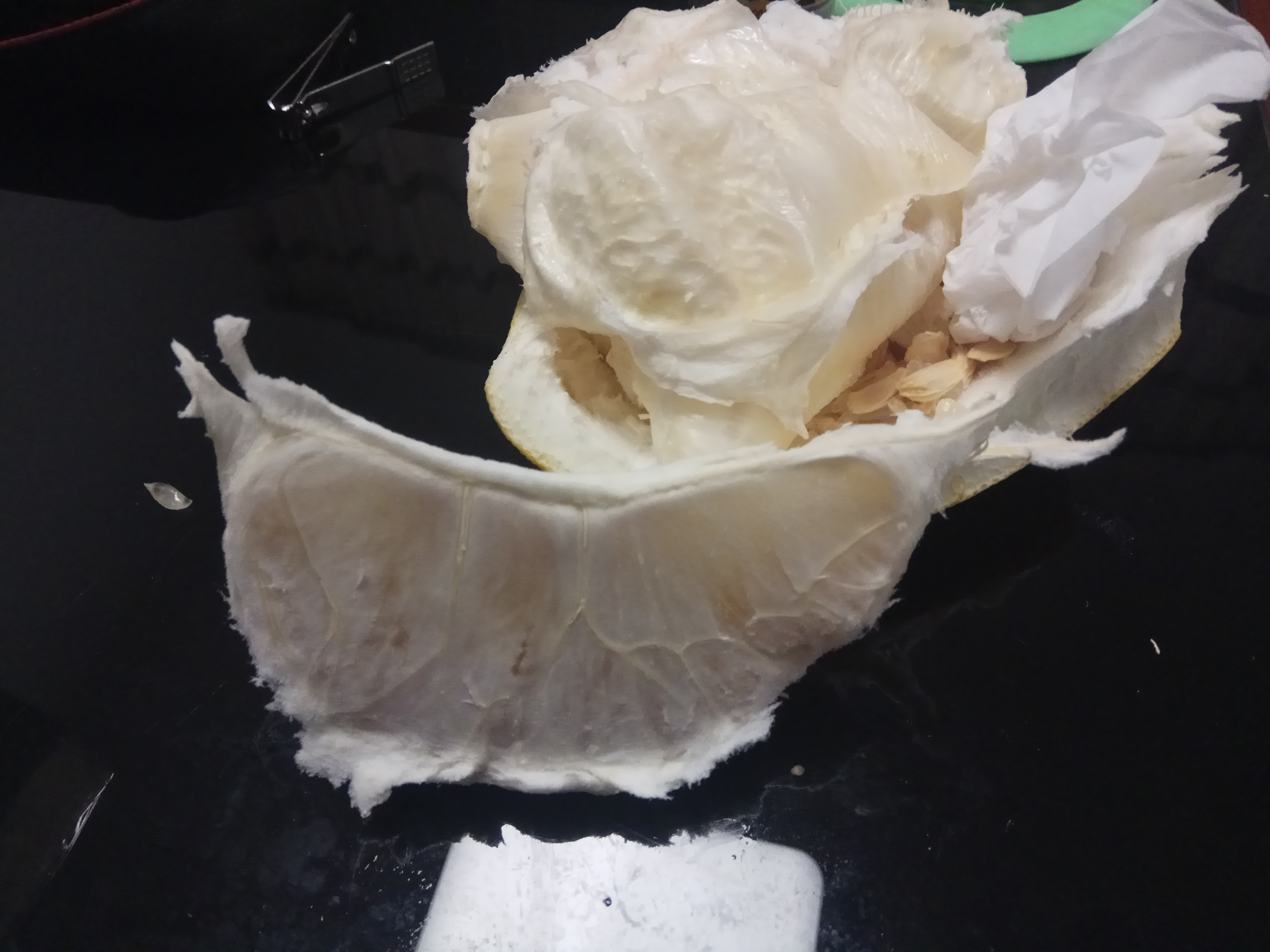
Wendan

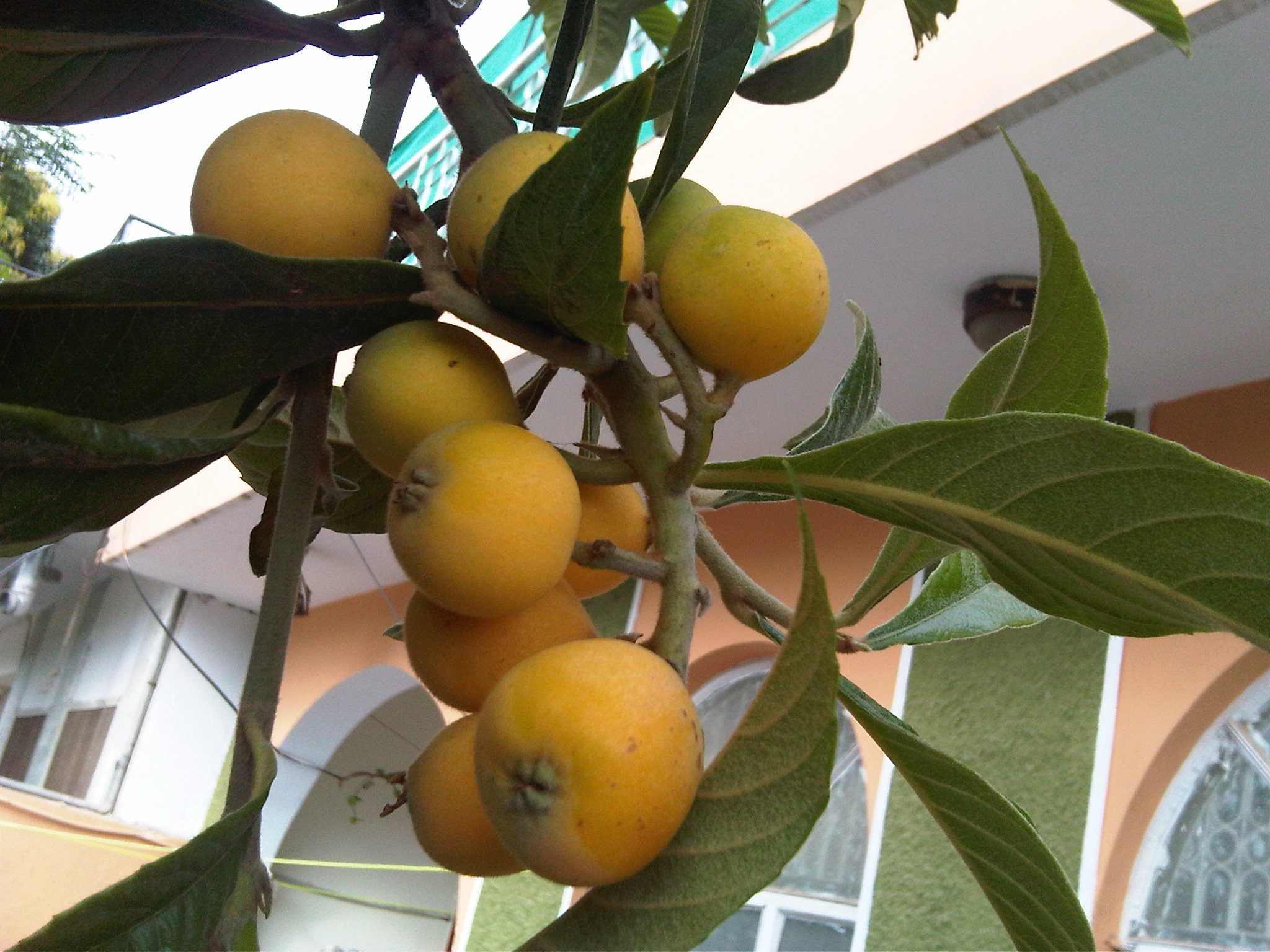
Loquat

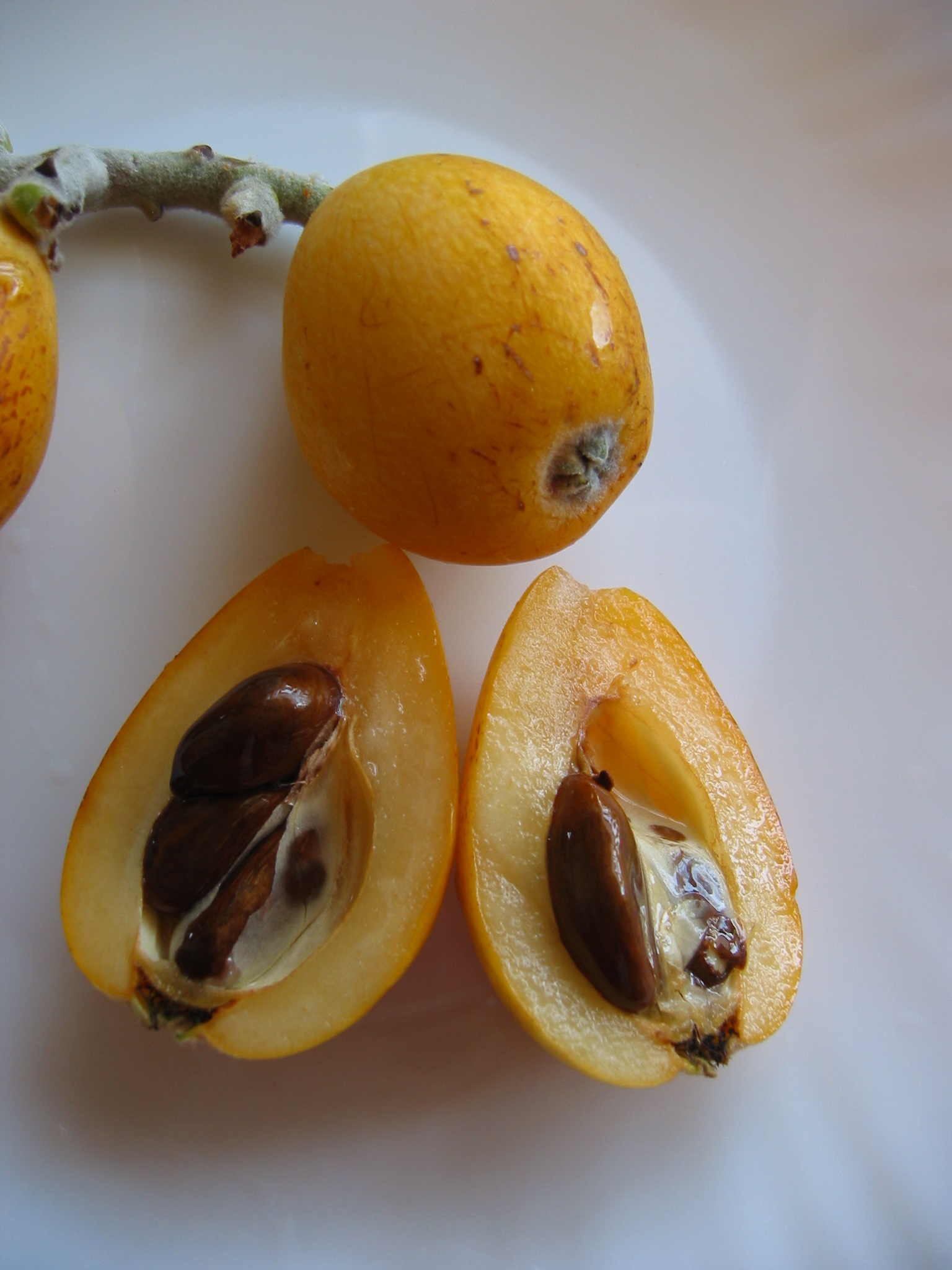
Loquat

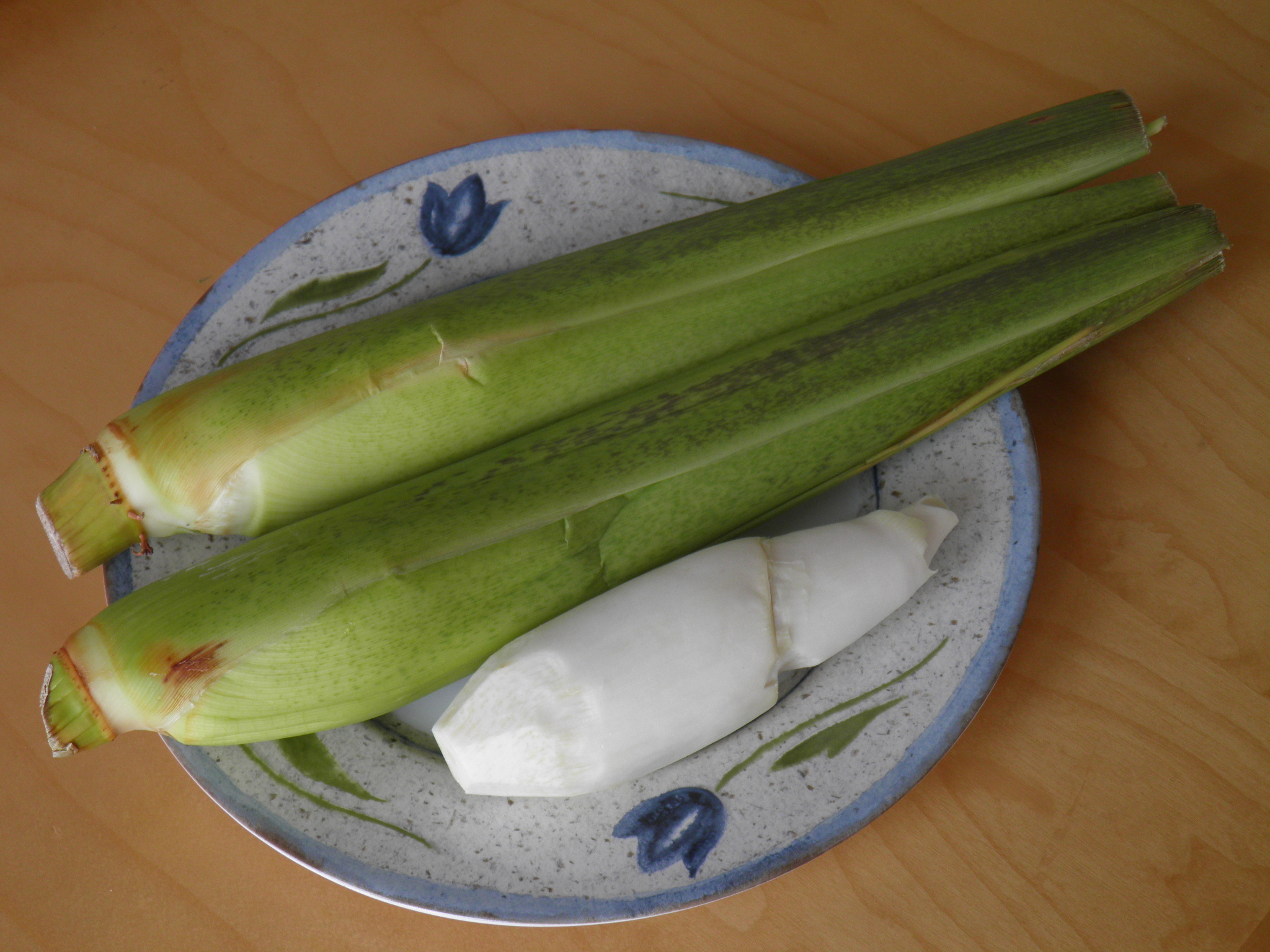
Wild rice stems

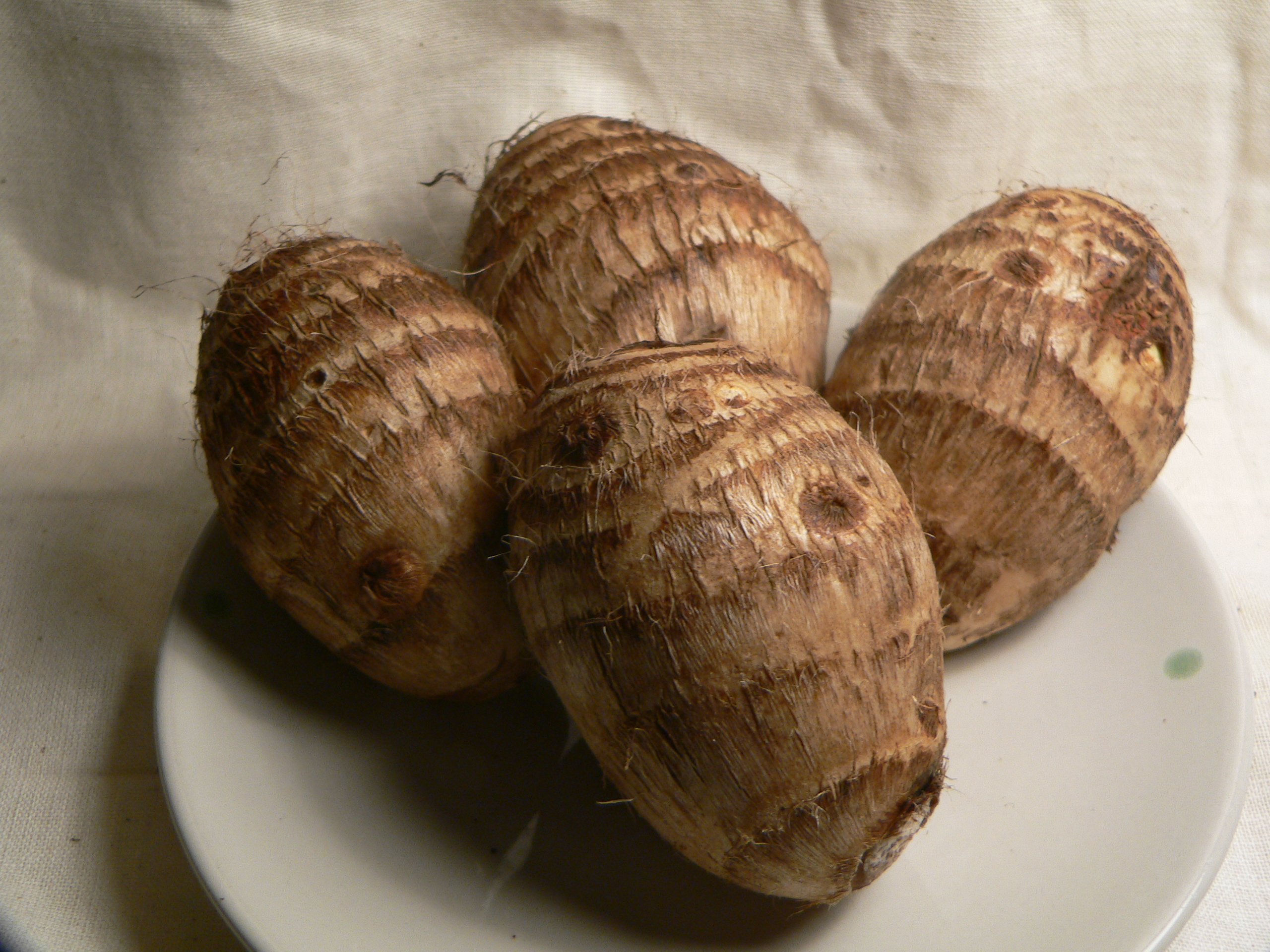
Eddoe

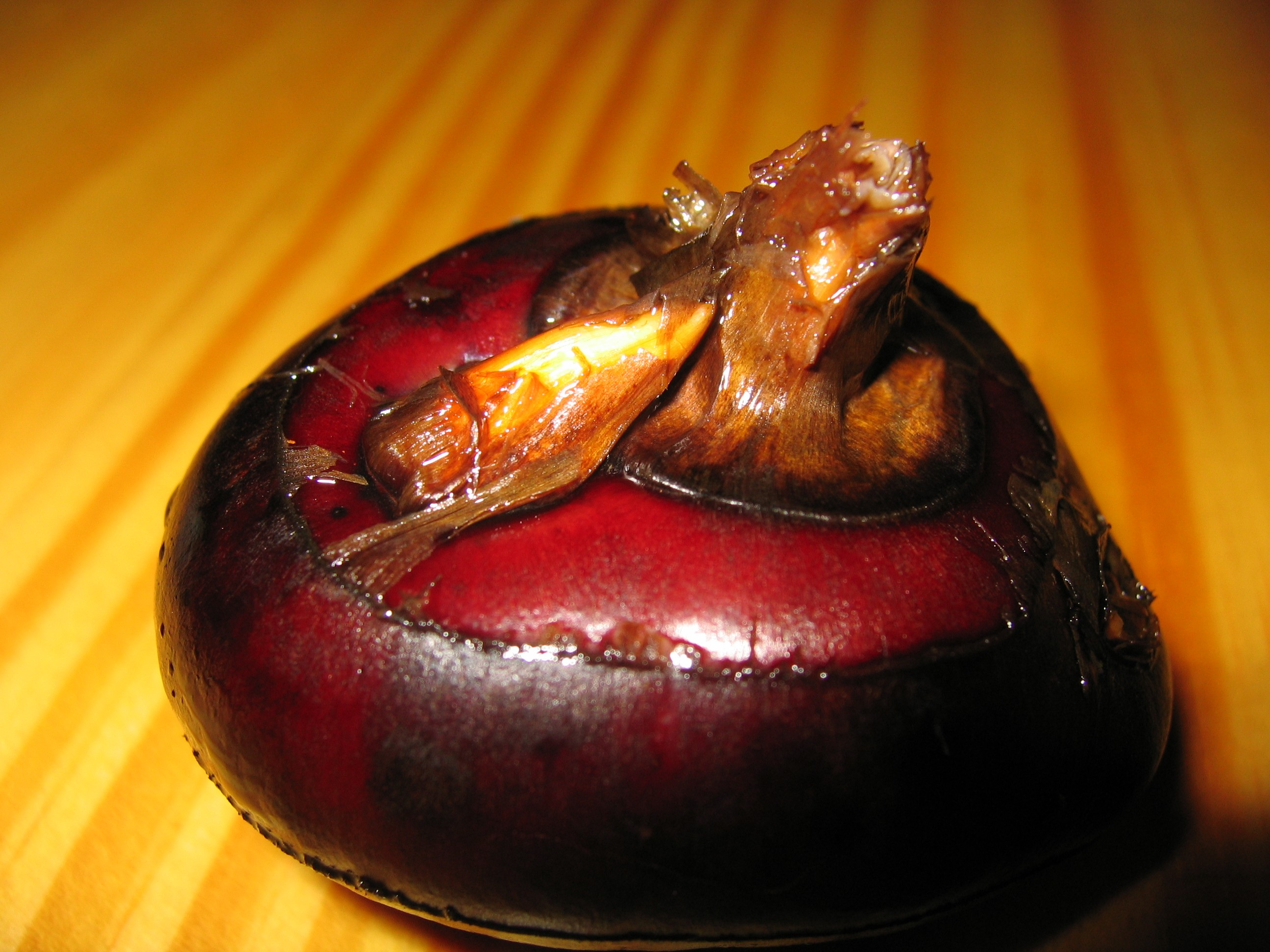
Water chestnut

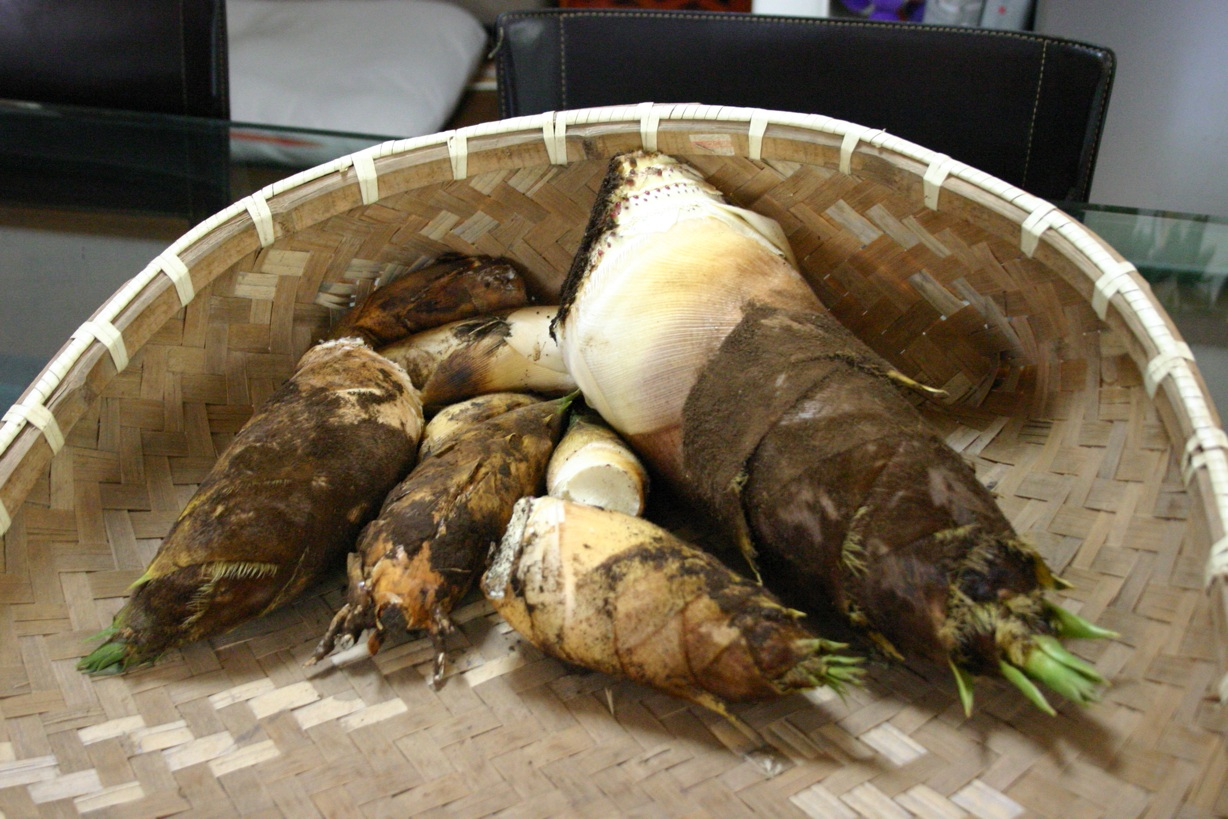
Bamboo sprouts

== Infrastructure and transport ==
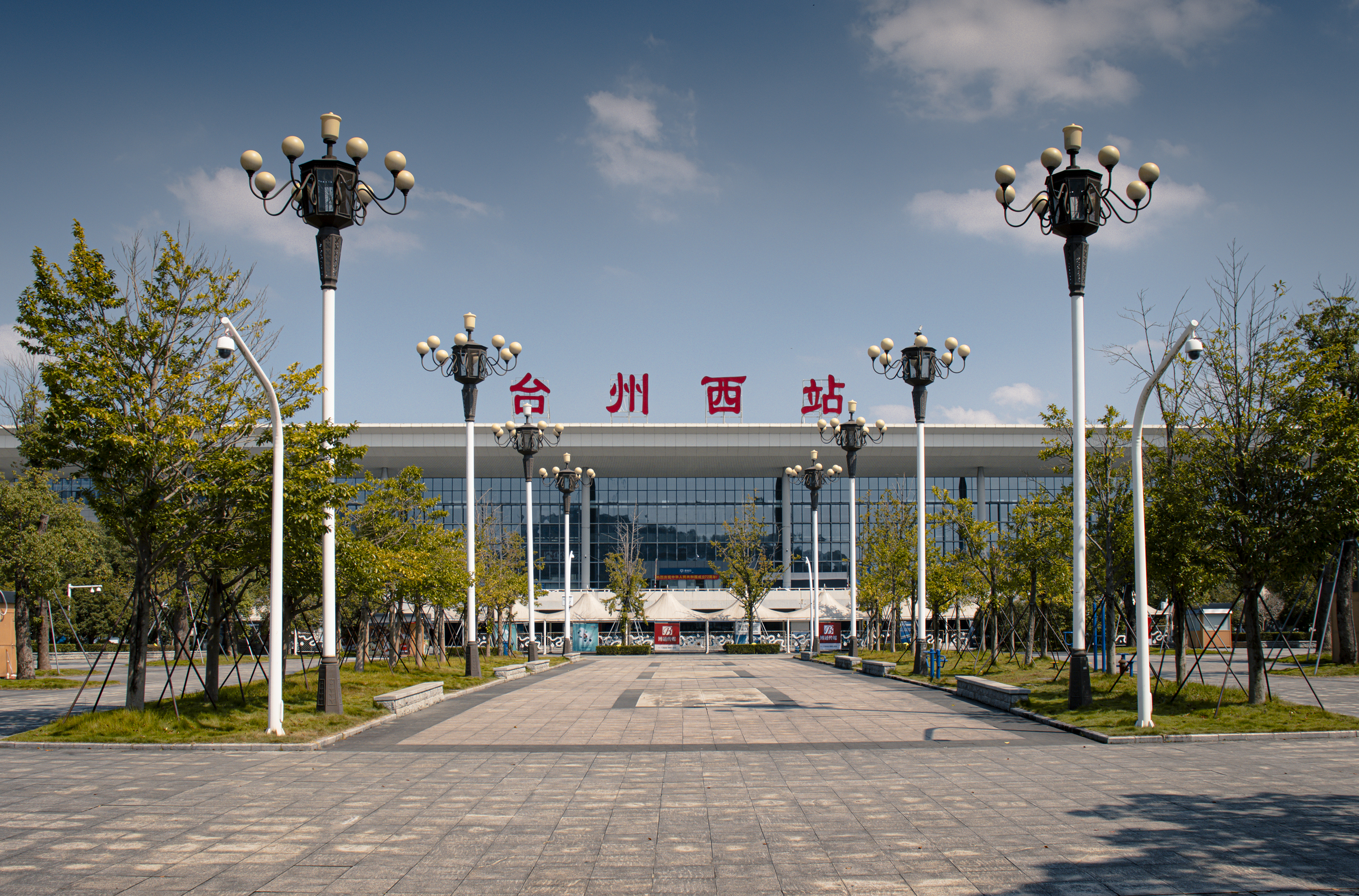
Taizhou West Railway Station, completed in 2009

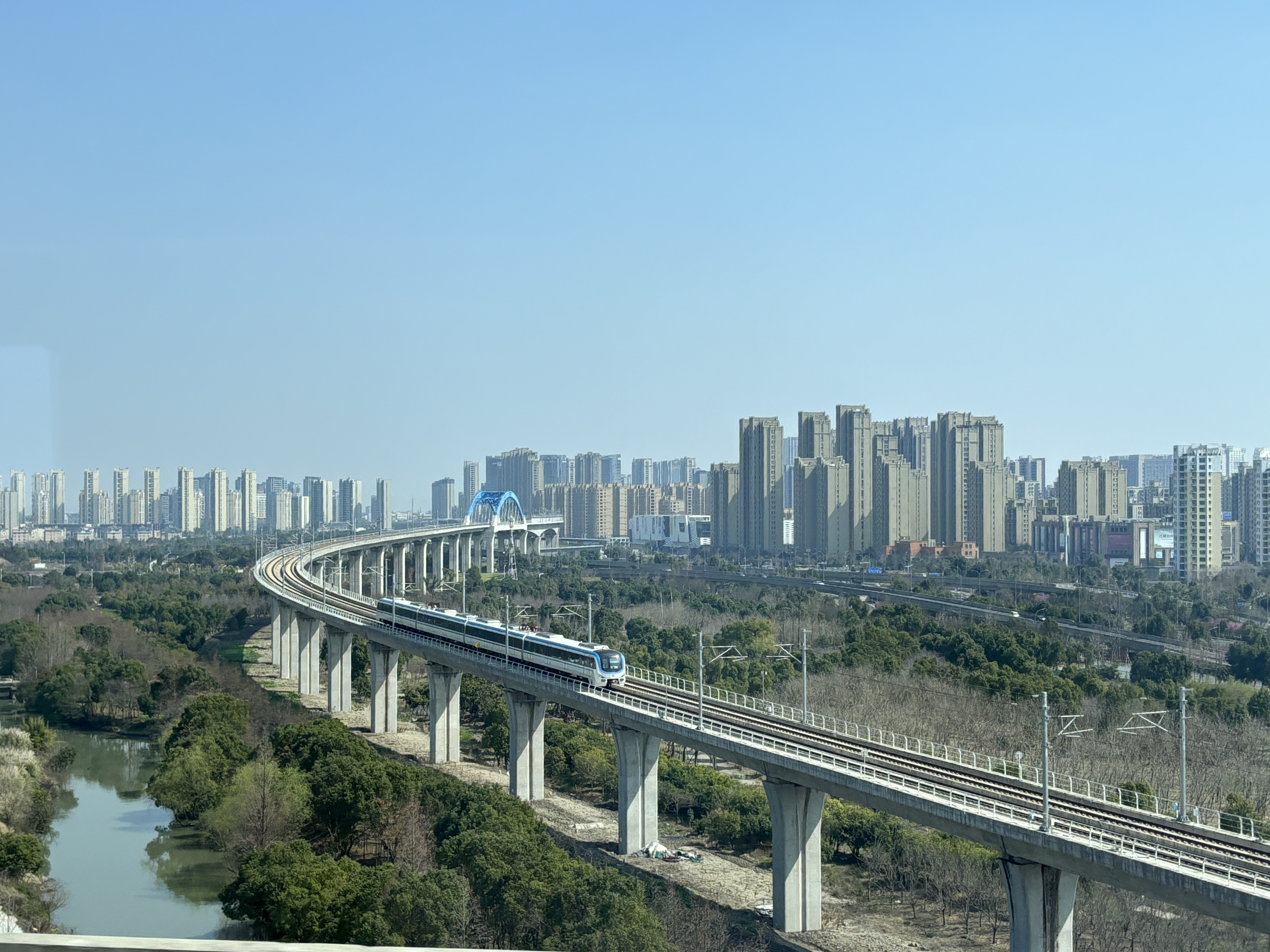
Taizhou Rail Transit S1 train in Luqiao District

Historically, Taizhou was relatively inaccessible by road due to its mountainous terrain. This has changed due to large infrastructure restructuring in the late 1990s and early 2000s. Presently, Taizhou is served by the S1 Ningbo–Taizhou–Wenzhou Expressway (甬台温高速公路), which is a segment in the north–south G15 Shenyang–Haikou Expressway, linking the city with Ningbo, Shanghai in the north and Wenzhou in the south; the Shangsan Expressway links Taizhou with the provincial capital Hangzhou. Taizhou Luqiao Airport was once named Huangyan Luqiao Airport (IATA:HYN) in the city's Luqiao District serves daily flights to Beijing and Chengdu and regular flights to other major Chinese cities.

In September 2009, the high-speed Ningbo–Taizhou–Wenzhou railway opened. There are several stations in the prefecture boundaries of Taizhou. The station serving the urban core is in Huangyan District and is called Taizhou railway station. A second line, the Hangzhou–Taizhou high-speed railway, opened in January 2022. Taizhou Central railway station on the line will serve Jiaojiang District.

The first line of Taizhou Rail Transit opened in December 2022.

== Language and culture ==
Like the majority of areas in Zhejiang, most people from Taizhou speak a dialect of Wu Chinese, known as Taizhou Wu. It is not mutually intelligible with Mandarin Chinese, and only partially intelligible with Shanghainese. There is also a small portion of Min Nan and Wenzhou dialect speakers in the southern regions. None of these three languages are mutually intelligible amongst each other, but the linguistic diversity of some regions has resulted in a segment of the population becoming fluent in speaking up to four languages, when Mandarin is included.

The city's people are reputed to be industrious and business-minded, although not to the same degree as neighboring Wenzhou. Many people from the area have migrated abroad after economic reforms began in China in 1978. The city's seafood is of note.

== Education ==
- Taizhou University
- Archives of Yuhuan

== Notable people ==
- Ji Gong (济公) – Buddhist monk and historical figure
- Chen Fangyun (陈芳允) – electrical engineer and recipient of the "Two Bombs, One Satellite" meritorious award
- Li Shufu (李书福) – Chinese billionaire entrepreneur founder of Geely
- Fan Yilin – 2015 & 2017 uneven bars world gymnastics champion
- Zhou Jieqiong (周洁琼; Korean: 주결경) – Produce 101 contestant, member of I.O.I
- Xu Jiaqi (许佳琪) – SNH48 Member of Team SII, member of sub-unit 7Senses, member of The9
- Huang Yuting (黄雨婷) – Professional athlete of the Chinese national shooting team
- Ye Hongli (叶弘历) – Race car driver

== Tourism ==
- Walled City of Taizhou Fu, Linhai – Historical ancient city of Linhai, with city walls referred to as the "Southern Great Wall of China" that influenced the construction of other Great Wall locations such as Badaling.
- Guoqing Temple, Mountain Tiantai – The Guoqing Temple where the Tiantai (Chinese and Japanese: 天台宗; pinyin: tiāntāi zōng; ), an important school of Buddhism in China, Japan, Korea, and Vietnam originates, is located here. In Japan the school is known as Tendai, and in Korea it is known as Cheontae.
- Shenxianju (神仙居) – Roughly translated as "Home of the Immortals" is a mountainous national park west of Taizhou, known for its majestic and steep peaks and cliffs. Hikers can traverse up and hike across various constructed walkways and bridges, including the Ruyi Bridge.

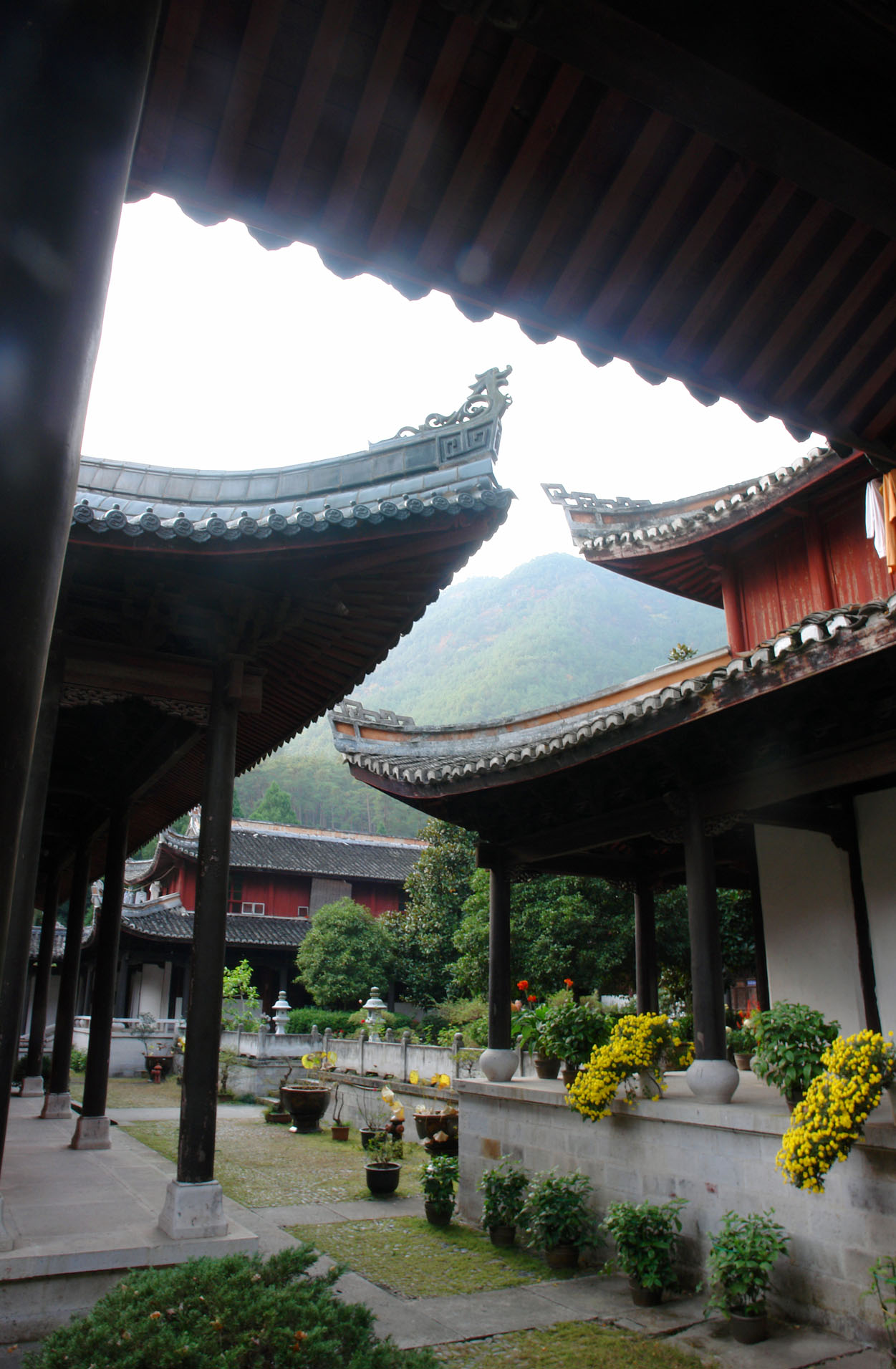
The Guoqing Temple on Mount Tiantai

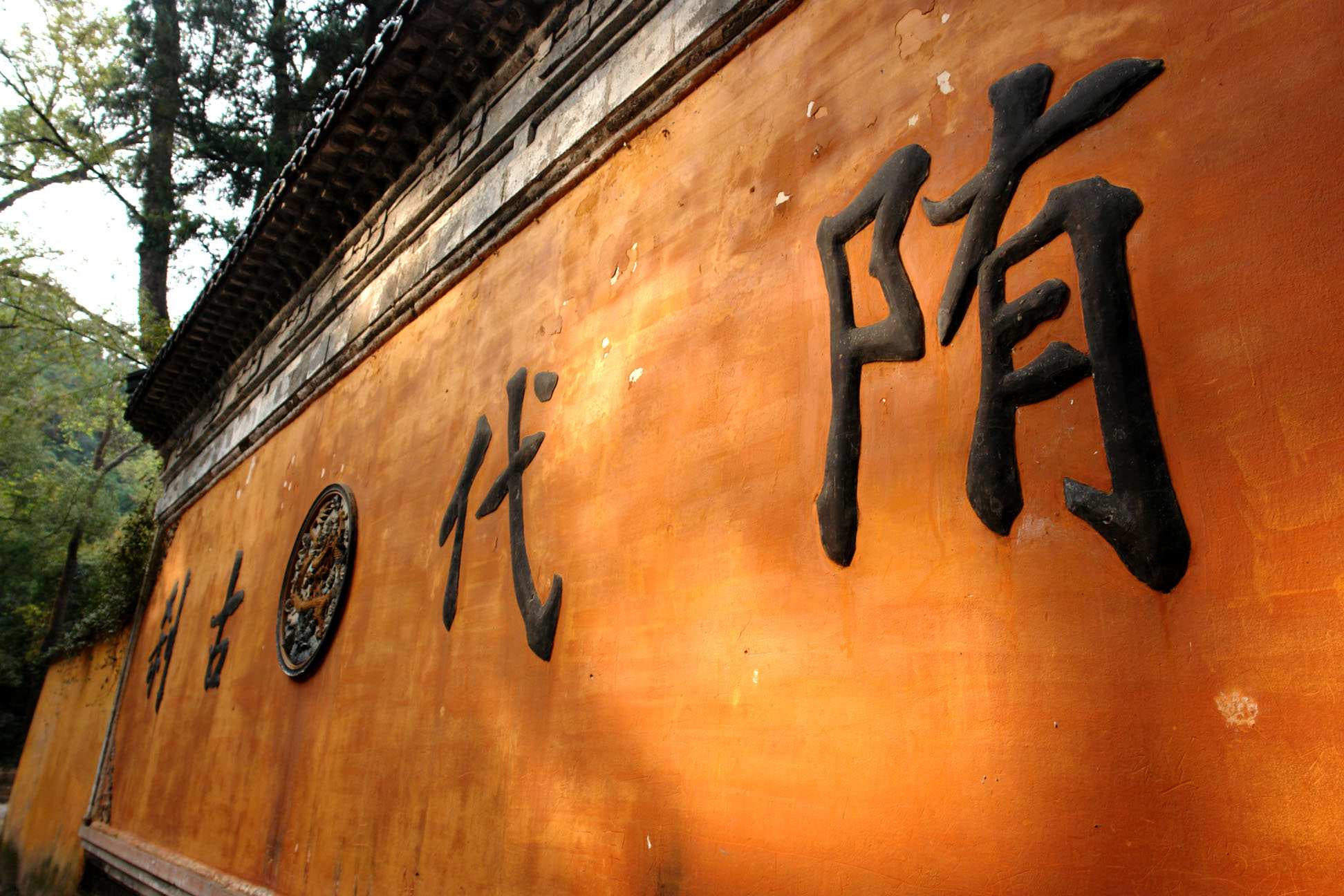

== Sister cities ==
- Fort Wayne, Indiana, United States (2012)
- Hanau, Germany

== See also ==
- List of twin towns and sister cities in China
- Ruyi Bridge
