= Shamen =

Town in Yuhuan, Zhejiang, China

Shamen Town 沙门镇 Old names: 桐林仓、桐林乡、桐丽乡、桐丽管理区、桐丽人民公社
- Town
- Shamen
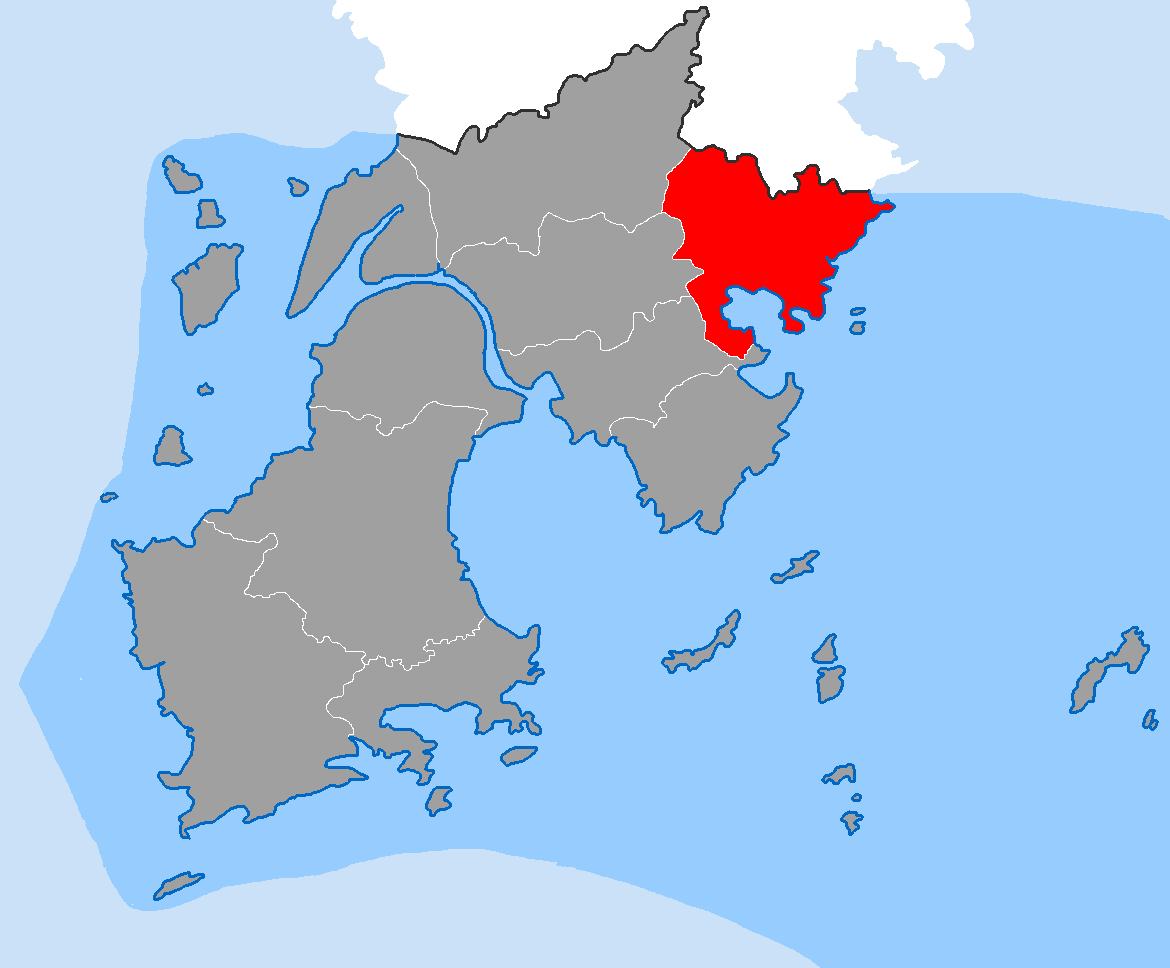
- The location of Shamen Town (highlighted in red in the image) within Yuhuan City.
- Interactive map of Shamen Town
- Country: People's Republic of China
- Province: Zhejiang
- County-level city: Yuhuan
- Neighbourhood committees: 0
- Administrative divisions: 23
- Established: 1986

Area
  - Total: 36.69 km^{2} (14.17 sq mi)
- Postal code: 317607
- Administrative subdivision code: 33 10 83 105 000
- Area code: +86 (0)576

Shamen Town (in Chinese: 沙门镇; pinyin: Shāmén zhèn) is a town-level administrative unit under Yuhuan, Zhejiang Province, People's Republic of China. It is situated northeast of Yuhuan, bordering the East and South with the East China Sea, and connecting to Longxi, Chumen, and Qinggang to the west, and Chengnan of Wenling to the north. It covers an area of 36.69 square kilometers and administratively includes 23 village-level divisions. Shamen is the central town of the province of Zhejiang, known for its emphasis on education and eco-friendly initiatives. In 2017, the total population of the town was 25,884.

Originally named Tongli Township (in Chinese: 桐丽乡), Shamen was established as a town in 1986. Its name originates from the abundant sea sand at the entrance of the village of Shamen, where the town government is located. Within Shamen, there is the Sibian Xiaolu vigilant defense fortress site, a Zhejiang Provincial cultural relic protection unit. Additionally, the mainland China's first training and teaching center for Taiwan universities is also established there. Shamen has evolved into an industrial powerhouse within Yuhuan.

== Administrative development ==
=== Establishment ===
During the Qing dynasty, the area under the jurisdiction of Shamen belonged to the Fifteenth and Sixteenth Dou. In the late Qing Dynasty, it was known as Tonglin and later divided into the First to Fourteenth Bao. From the first year of the Republic of China to the founding of the People's Republic of China, it was known as Tonglin Township. In 1950, Tonglin and Guoli were established as two townships, and in 1952, these townships and Baishan were set up separately. In the first half of 1956, the three townships were merged into Tongli Township, taking one character from each of the names Tonglin and Guoli. Later, it was reorganized from a township into an administrative region, and renamed Tongli People's Commune. In 1984, following political and communal separation, it reverted to being Tongli Township. In 1986, it was reclassified as Shamen Town.

=== Administrative subdivisions ===
Location of Shamen in China.

The government office of Shamen is situated at No. 31, Shamen Village Road, which is the origin of the name "Shamen" for the town. Its name derived from the abundant coastal sand when the area used to be tidal flats. Shamen Village serves as the political, economic, and cultural center of Shamen Town.

Currently, Shamen Town administer 23 village-level divisions: Wuyan Village, Zhanga Village, Shuitongao Village, Sibian Village, Dashawan Village, Shamen Village, Lushang Village, Da'aoli Village, Ling'ao Village, Dudun Village, Duntou Village, Shangshantou Village, Lishan Village, Waishan Village, Ganjiaoao Village, Bailingxia Village, Xiaolu Village, Shuangdou Village, Yaokeng Village, Anren Village, Lingmen Village, Nanshan'ao Village, and Ria Village; under these are 300 villagers' groups.

In 2019, the mayor of Shamen was Chi Yuzhi, and the secretary of the town's party committee was Luo Junqian.

== Geographical environment ==
=== Overview ===
Shamen is located in the plains of the Yuhuan-Chumen peninsula. It belongs to a coastal plain and a semi-coastal mountainous area. Situated in the northeast of Yuhuan, it is 29 kilometers away from the county seat. To the east and southeast lies the East China Sea, while to the west, southwest, it connects with Longxi, Chumen, and Qinggang, and to the north, it borders Chengnan Town of Wenling City.

The area spans 8.61 kilometers north to south and 9.23 kilometers east to west, with a total area of 36.69 square kilometers, including 35.47 square kilometers of land and 1.22 square kilometers of water. In the total area, mountainous regions cover the highest proportion at 61.77%, followed by paddy fields at 18.5%, dry land at 17.76%, and water bodies at 1.97%. It is surrounded by mountains in the northwest and east, with Datong Mountain as the main peak, reaching an altitude of 393 meters. The southeast is adjacent to the East China Sea, featuring low-lying terrain and extensive soil. After the 1950s, locals reclaimed over a thousand acres by constructing four seawalls. The area is crisscrossed with rivers and canals, and there are reservoirs like Xiaolu Reservoir, Huakeng Reservoir, Lishan Reservoir, Ria Reservoir, and Shuitongao Reservoir built among the valleys, meeting the irrigation needs of rice fields.

Shamen town

Climate chart (precipitation, max. and min. temperature)
J	F	M	A	M	J	J	A	S	O	N	D
74 11 6	127 12 6	160 16 12	165 17 13	199 22 17	334 23 19	106 26 21	320 27 24	304 24 21	107 22 19	125 17 15	101 12 6
- █ Average max. and min. temperatures in °C
- █ Precipitation totals in mm
Imperial conversion
J	F	M	A	M	J	J	A	S	O	N	D
2.9 52 43	5 54 43	6.3 61 54	6.5 63 55	7.8 72 63	13 73 66	4.2 79 70	13 81 75	12 75 70	4.2 72 66	4.9 63 59	4 54 43
- █ Average max. and min. temperatures in °F
- █ Precipitation totals in inches

=== Climate ===
The jurisdiction of Shamen falls within a subtropical monsoon climate zone, influenced by the ocean, characterized by mild and humid weather. The average annual temperature is 17.7 degrees Celsius, with an annual precipitation of 1577.5 millimeters and a frost-free period of approximately 300 days. The average temperature remains around 17°C annually, with August being the warmest at an average of 27°C, and January being the coldest at an average of 8°C. The average annual precipitation is 2023 millimeters, with rainfall in June reaching 334 millimeters and 74 millimeters in January.

== Infraestructure ==
By the end of 2011, Shamen had a total of 6 kindergartens, 2 primary schools (Yuhuan Shamen Central Primary School and Yuhuan Shamen Guoli Primary School) and 1 middle school (Yuhuan Shamen Junior High School. There also had 1 post office, 1 telecommunications company with 2 service outlets, 1 water supply plant, 1 library, 9 healthcare institutions, 1 market, and 17 supermarkets spanning over 50 square meters.

All neighbourhood committees in Shamen have access to broadband, running water, television, and other basic infrastructure, as well as centralized waste and sewage treatment.

=== Transport ===
In 2011, the total road length in Shamen was 12.8 kilometers and a total of 16 bridges. The Yongtaiwen Fuxian Expressway and the provincial highway 226 pass through this town. The planned Taizhou City Regional Railway S1 Line and the provincial highway 203 will also pass through Shamen. The Tiantong Highway, a county road, is 14 kilometers long and runs through Shamen from the central street to Yaokeng at the junction with Wenling. This road has a width of 4.5 to 6 meters, with a gravel surface, classified as a fourth-level road, completed in two phases in October 1973 and October 1974. Additionally, there are 3 bus routes in the town, covering a mileage of approximately 25 kilometers, providing public transportation to all village committees in the jurisdiction. On May 26, 2018, the Shamen Xing'an Transport Center was officially put into use, with a total investment of 45 million yuan and a building area of about 17,000 square meters, to some extent alleviating the transportation inconveniences of Shamen.

== Economy ==
=== Fishing industry ===
Due to its proximity to the East China Sea, Shamen has a developed fishing industry with complex facilities such as Lingmen Fishing Port. Lingmen Fishing Port is a national second-level fishing port within Shamen. With an area of 48,000 square meters, it can accommodate 250 fishing boats and facilitates processing, distribution of aquatic products, and also serves tourism. In 2011, the total production output in Shamen reached 18,000 tons.

=== Agriculture ===
In 2017, Shamen Town had a total of 38 agricultural cooperatives. In 2011, the town's arable land covered an area of 8,600 acres, with over 30,000 acres of forest land, generating an agricultural output value of 5.8 billion yuan. Various grains amounted to 3,042 tons, with a focus on rice, potatoes, wheat, and beans. The town also reared over 13,000 pigs. The "Wumenpai" crab and "Rongguang" rice are renowned specialty agricultural products in the area. Additionally, Shamen cultivates and sells citrus fruits, grapes, loquats, and other products.

=== Industry ===
Since 2018, Shamen has persisted in developing the "Industrial Strong Town" strategy, attracting enterprises to settle and leading multiple industrial economic indicators within the scope of Yuhuan. In 2017, Shamen had a total of 407 companies.

Shamen Binhai Industrial City is located within Shamen, next to the Yongtaiwen Fuxian Expressway Shamen Interchange, and is connected to the provincial road S226. Built on salt fields and tidal flats, it covers a planned area of approximately 600 hectares, with the first phase covering about 200 hectares. By the end of 2017, Shamen Binhai Industrial City had 261 settled enterprises, including 117 in production, solving employment for over 16,000 people.

== Sites of interest ==
=== Historical sites ===
There are two cultural heritage sites in Shamen, both of which were later promoted to cultural heritage sites in Zhejiang.

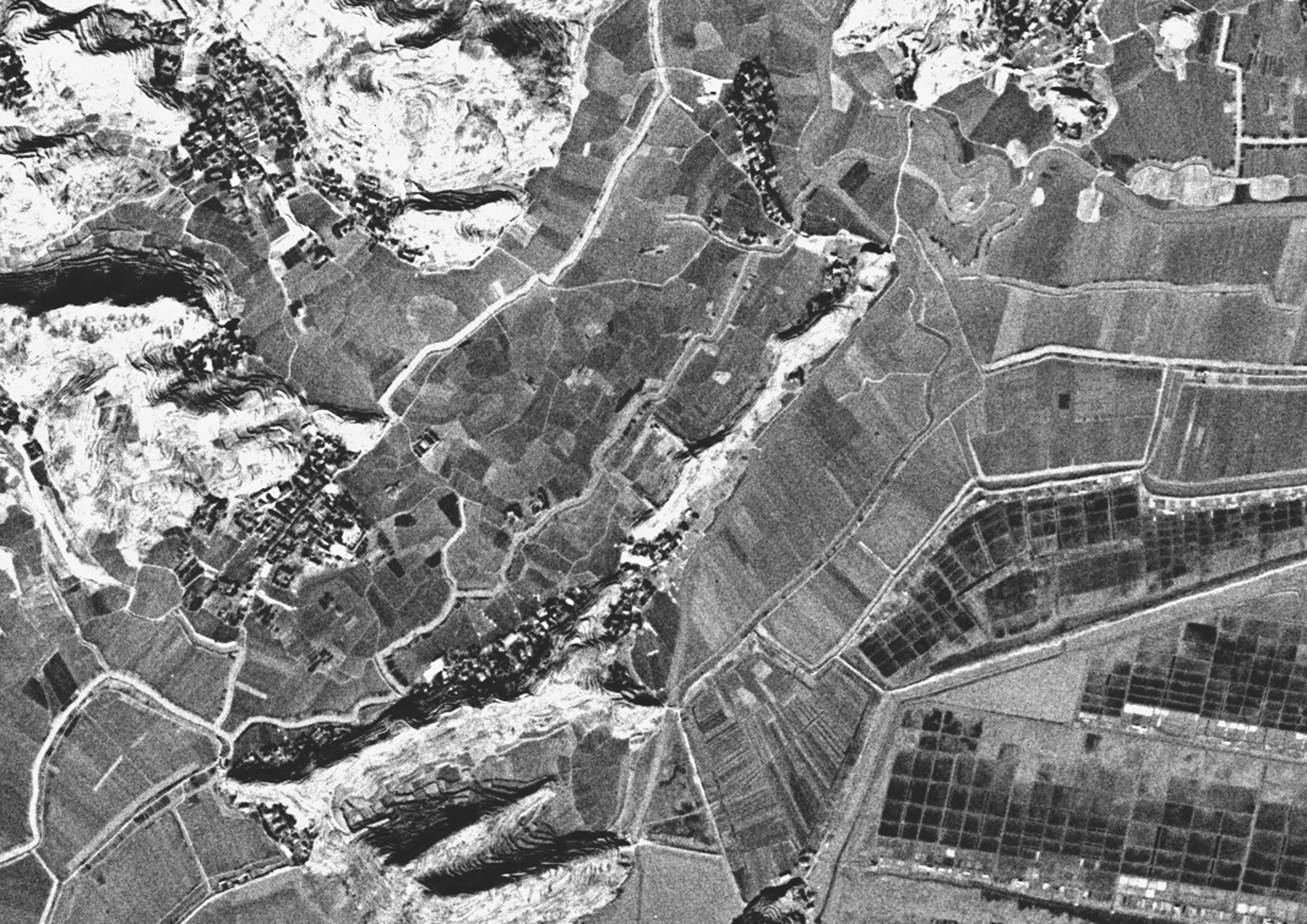
Located in Sibian Village, Shamen, the Zhejiang Province Cultural Heritage Site— Sibian Xiaolu vigilant defense fortress site.

The Sibian Xiaolu vigilant defense fortress site, also known as the Tucheng ruins, is a cultural heritage site situated in Sibian Village. It stands at the western foothill of Shamen Town's She Mountain (now Sibian), built by the Ming Dynasty military to resist coastal Japanese pirates. On August 24, 2016, it was included in the fourth batch of Yuhuan Cultural Heritage Sites, and on February 7, 2017, it was listed as a cultural heritage site in Zhejiang . The outline of the city wall remains distinct, representing an important coastal defense site in Yuhuan.

Pinghuan Bridge is an ancient bridge located in Bailingsha Village, Shamen, locally known as "Gongqiao Tou," and is also one of Yuhuan's cultural heritage sites. It was reconstructed in 1878 (during the fourth year of the Qing Dynasty's Guangxu period), with an unknown initial construction date, serving as an essential route between Yuhuan and Wenling.

=== Natural sites ===
Riao Beach is situated in the northeastern part of Shamen, stretching 700 meters long and approximately 30 meters wide, covering an area of 21,000 square meters. It faces Shitang in Wenling. The bay forms a "W" shape, and the gravel is spread across Outer Shan'ao.

Xiaolu Reservoir is a reservoir located at the border between Shamen and Wenling, built in 1964, mainly in the mountainous region. Its normal water level is at 35.3 meters, with a corresponding storage capacity of 2.5 million cubic meters, playing a crucial role in flood control, irrigation, and domestic water supply.

== Population ==
=== Demographics ===
In 2017, the registered population in the administrative area of Shamen reached 25,884 individuals, with 28,638 employed. In 2011, the total population in the administrative area was 25,828, including 102 urban permanent residents, with an urbanization rate of 6.2%. Within the area, there were 101 individuals from ethnic minorities, including the Tujia and Miao ethnic groups, accounting for 0.4% of the town's total population. The birth rate was 1.09%, the death rate was 0.6%, resulting in a natural growth rate of 0.49%.

Total population in Shamen over the years
Statistical year	Total population in the administrative area	Source	Notes
1984	21202		
1988	22496		
1992	23051		
1993	23101		
1994	23135		
1995	23197		
1996	23290		
1997	23200		
2000	20066		Fifth National Population Census of the People's Republic of China The figures may not be precise.
2010	25958		Sixth National Population Census of the People's Republic of China
2011	25828		
2015	25901		
2016	25863		
2017	25884		

=== Traditions ===
Shamen, located by the coast with abundant aquatic products, has a method of processing small anchovies into 'yusheng'. This method is low-cost, simple, and has a long history, now achieving industrialization. Additionally, foods like mung bean noodles, green rice balls, tongzi leaf wraps, tin cakes, and their crafting techniques are widely cherished and considered as a heritage in the area. The local agricultural and fishing production customs, dietary habits, and customs during the Spring Festival also have their unique characteristics.

== Distinctions ==
- Shamen is the central town of Zhejiang Province and is considered a strong educational town.
- In May 2006, it was recognized as the 'Advanced Collective for Population and Family Planning Work in the province of Zhejiang during the 'Fifteenth' Five-Year Plan'. In March of the following year, it was honored as the 'Advanced Town for Population and Family Planning Work in Taizhou - 2006'.
- In June 2007, it was acknowledged by the Leading Group for Zhejiang Provincial Ecological Construction as a 'Provincial Ecological Town in Zhejiang Province.

== See also ==
- Yuhuan Economic Development Zone
