= Qinggang =

Qinggang may refer to:

== Places in China ==
- Qinggang County, Heilongjiang province
- Qinggang station, in Chengdu, Sichuan
- Qinggang, Zhejiang

== People with the given name ==
- Zhao Qinggang (born 1985), Chinese track and field athlete

== See also ==
- Qin Gang (born 1966), Chinese diplomat and politician
