= Yuhuan =

Yuhuan 玉环市 Yuhwan
- County-level city
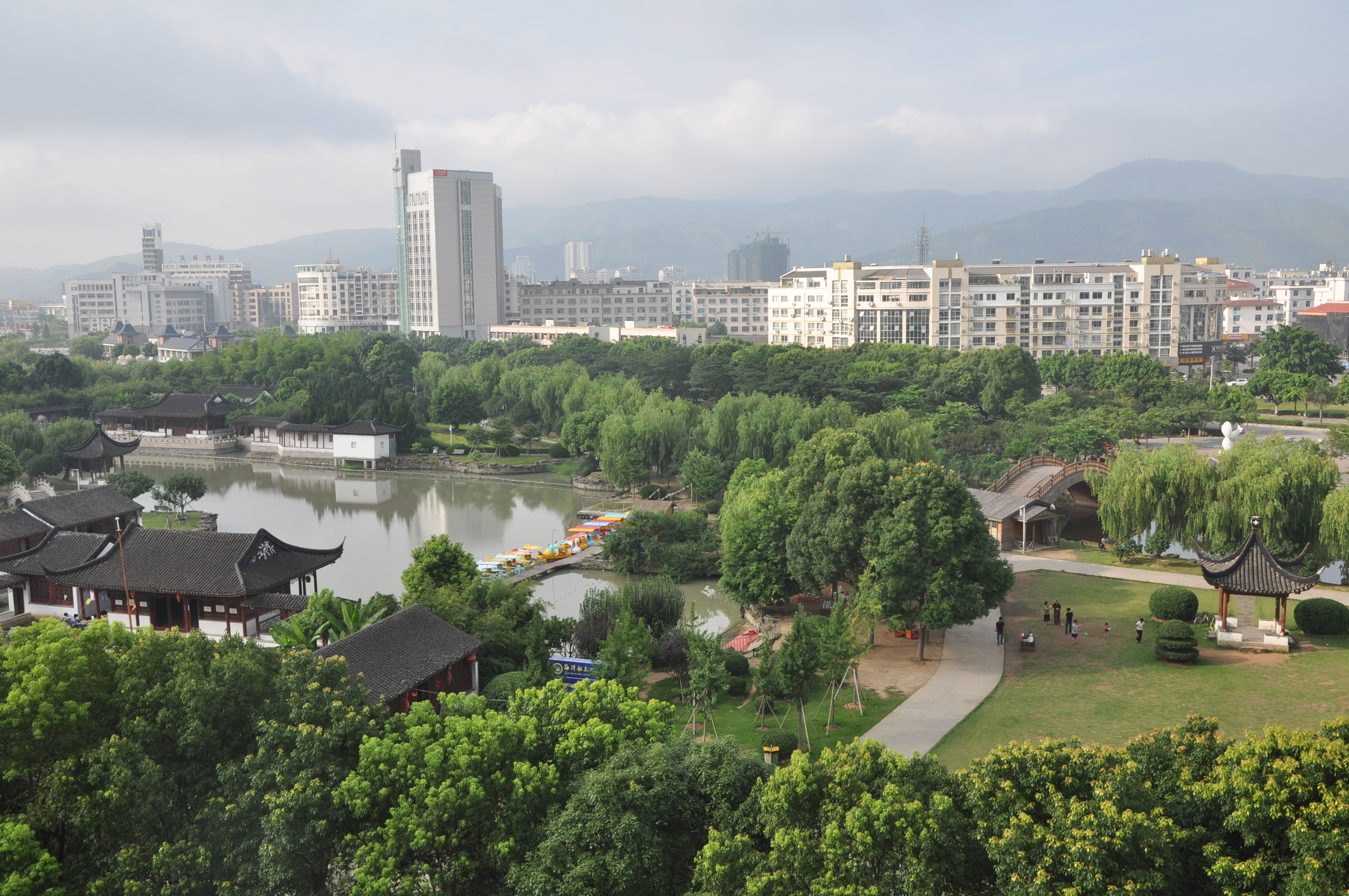

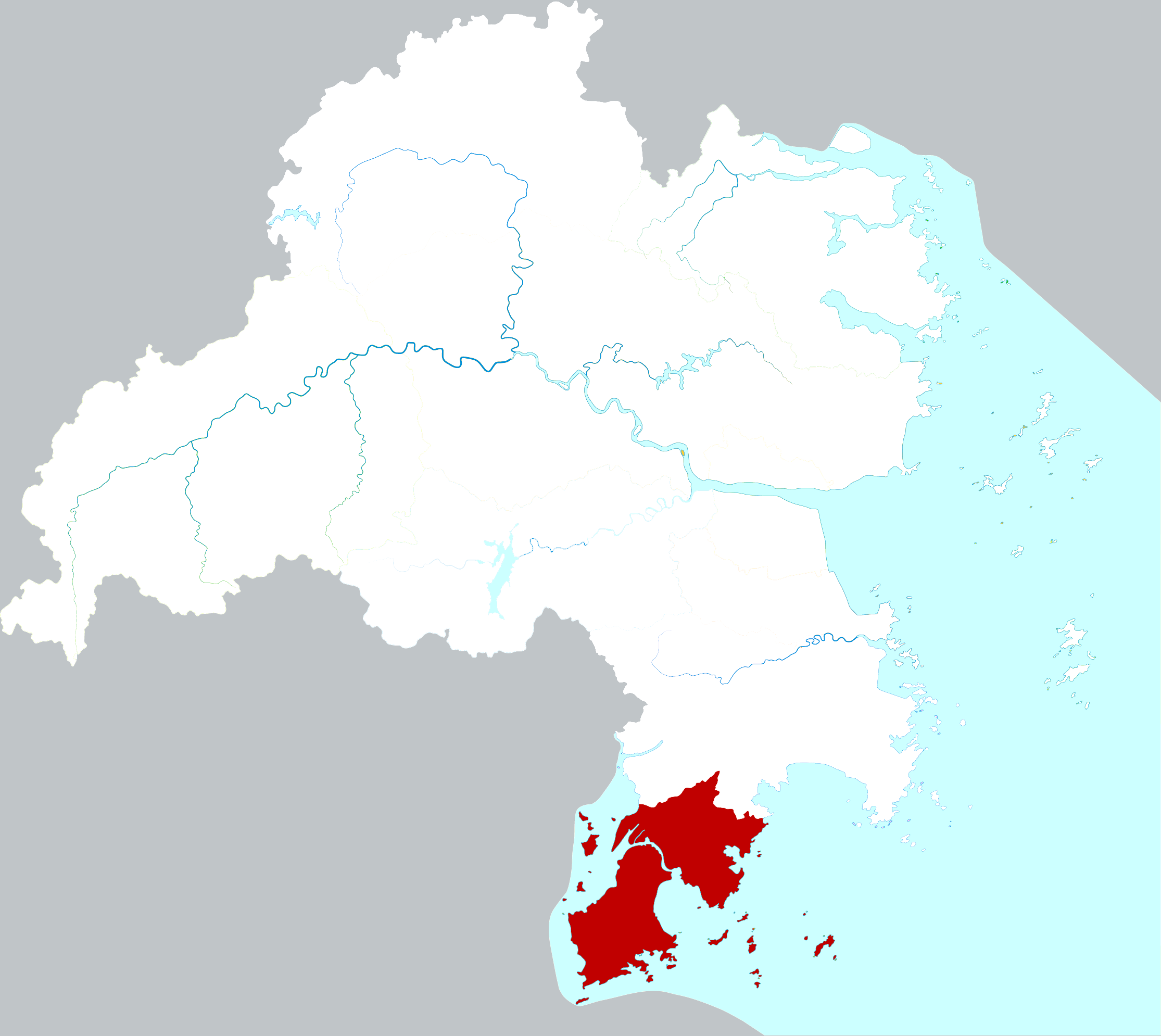
- Location in Taizhou

- Location in Zhejiang
- Coordinates: 28°08′09″N 121°13′35″E
- Country: People's Republic of China
- Province: Zhejiang
- Prefecture-level city: Taizhou

Area
  - Total: 2,279 km^{2} (880 sq mi)
  - Land: 378 km^{2} (146 sq mi)
- Highest elevation: 342 m (1,122 ft)

Population
  - Total: 392,800
- Time zone: UTC+8 (China Standard)
- Postal code: 317600
- Area code: (0)576
- Website: www.yuhuan.gov.cn

Yuhuan (simplified Chinese: 玉环; traditional Chinese: 玉環; pinyin: Yùhuán) is a county-level city of Taizhou, at the midsection along the coast of southeastern Zhejiang Province, China. Yuhuan, with total area of 2,279 km^{2} (880 sq mi) including land area of 378 km^{2} (146 sq mi), has a total population of 392,800 containing a permanent population of 93,000 from other provinces and regions.

Yuhuan administers three streets, six towns and two villages, referring to Yucheng Street, Damaiyu Street, Kanmen Street; Chumen Town, Qinggang Town, Lupu Town, Ganjiang Town, Shamen Town, Longxi Town; Jishan Village and Haishan Village. Yucheng Street is the administrative and commercial center of Yuhuan.

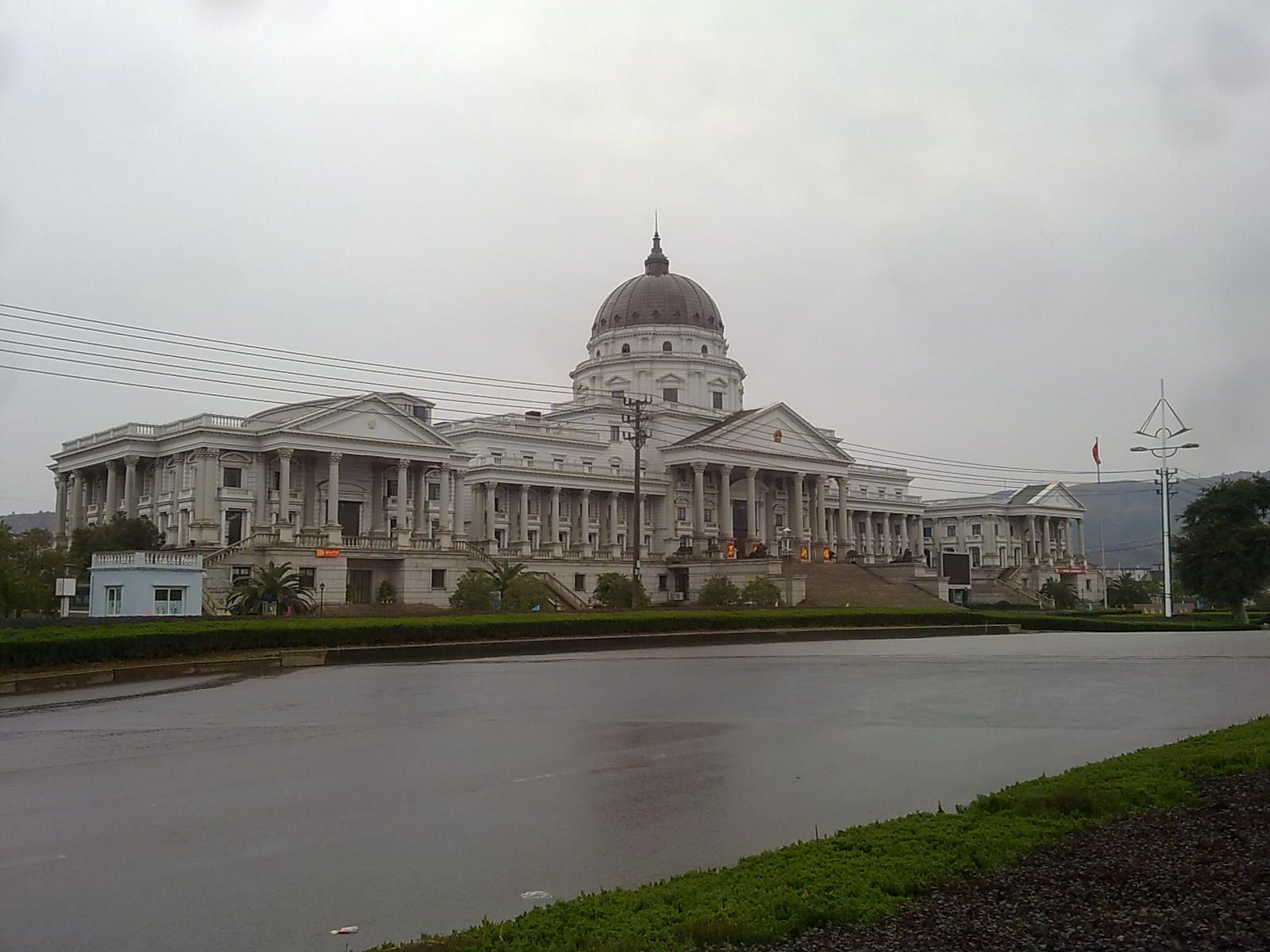
Yuhuan court house

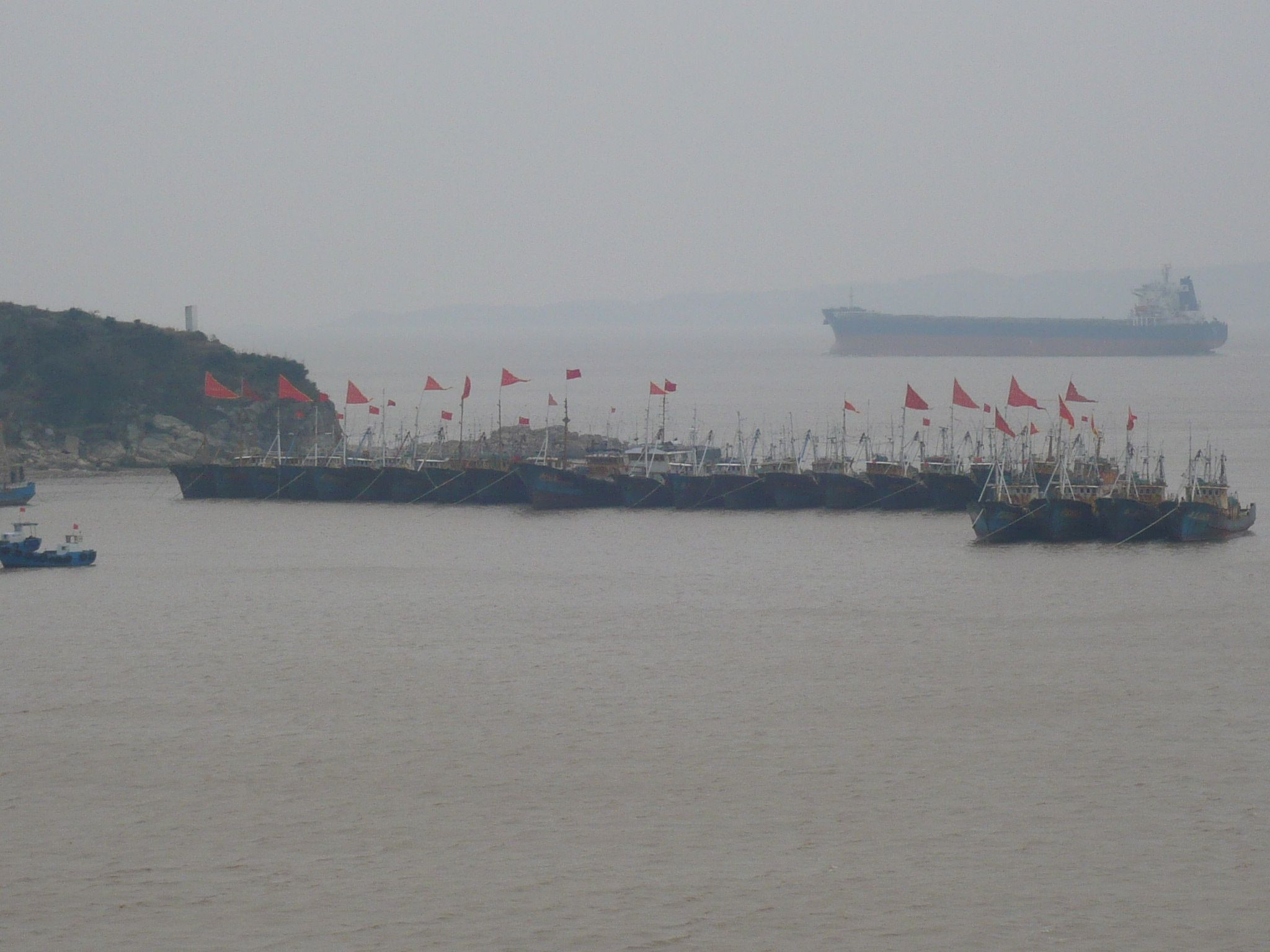
Fishing boats in the harbour of Xiandie village in south Yuhuan.

== Environment ==
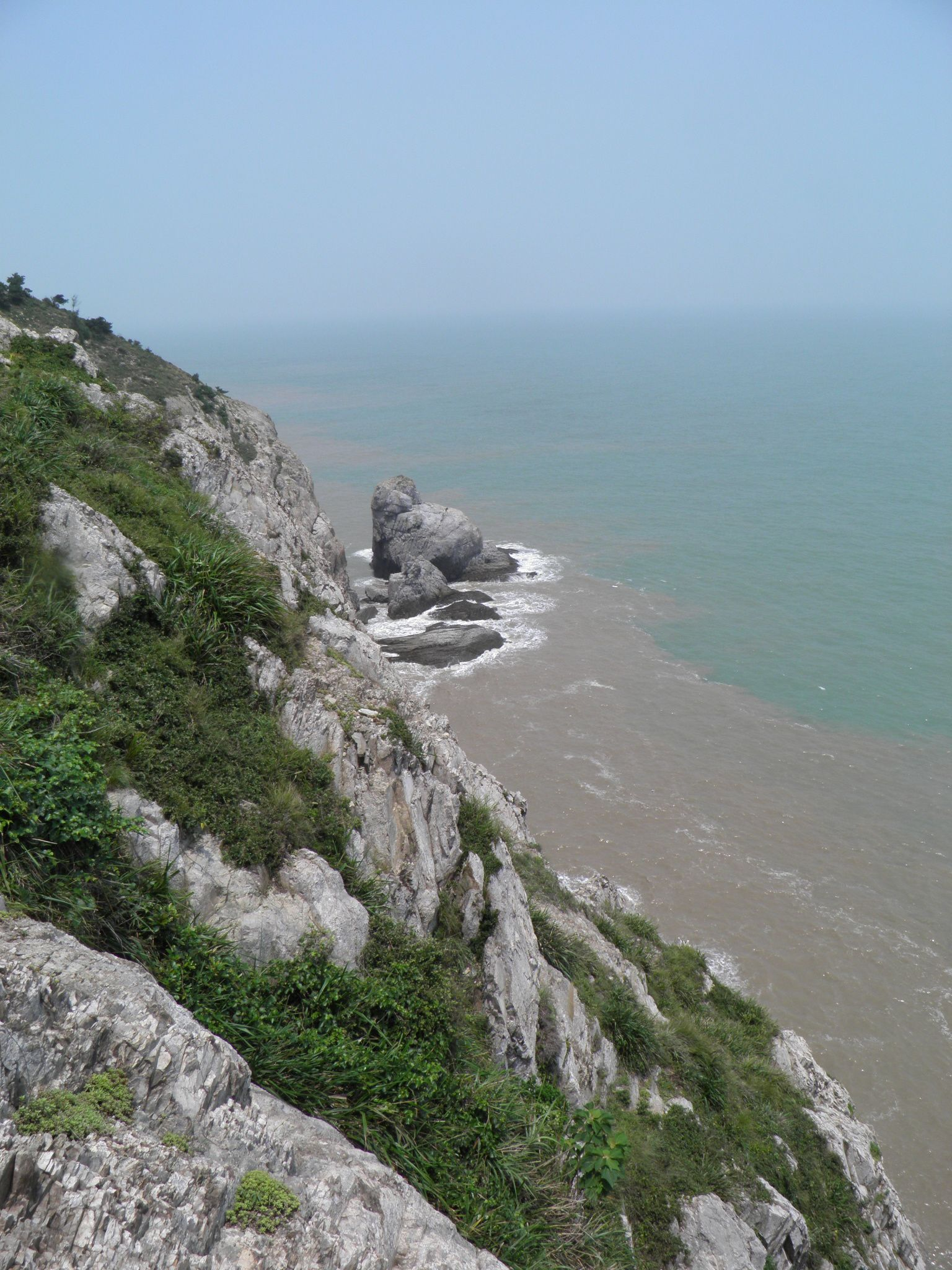
Daludao.

Yuhuan consists of numerous islands as well as a mainland part. Yuhuan Island is the largest island, and has maximum elevation of 342 metres (1,122 ft). Yuhuan Island is nowadays connected to the mainland with dikes and reclaimed land. Other islands include Daludao (Chinese: 大鹿岛; pinyin: Dàlùdǎo; lit. 'Big deer island'), which has been developed as a recreational area. The island has a network of footpaths and touristic sights, a beach, and a hotel.

== Administrative divisions ==
Subdistricts:

- Yucheng Subdistrict (玉城街道), Kanmen Subdistrict (坎门街道), Damaiyu Subdistrict (大麦屿街道)

Towns:

- Qinggang (清港镇), Chumen (楚门镇), Ganjiang (干江镇), Shamen (沙门镇), Lupu (芦浦镇), Longxi (龙溪镇)

Townships:

- Jishan Township (鸡山乡), Haishan Township (海山乡)

== Climate ==
Climate data for Yuhuan, elevation 96 m (315 ft), (1991–2020 normals, extremes 1951–present)
Month	Jan	Feb	Mar	Apr	May	Jun	Jul	Aug	Sep	Oct	Nov	Dec	Year
Record high °C (°F)	21.3 (70.3)	24.0 (75.2)	23.4 (74.1)	27.4 (81.3)	30.8 (87.4)	31.9 (89.4)	34.5 (94.1)	35.9 (96.6)	34.0 (93.2)	32.4 (90.3)	27.4 (81.3)	24.2 (75.6)	35.9 (96.6)
Mean daily maximum °C (°F)	10.9 (51.6)	11.6 (52.9)	14.3 (57.7)	18.7 (65.7)	23.1 (73.6)	26.2 (79.2)	29.6 (85.3)	30.3 (86.5)	28.0 (82.4)	23.9 (75.0)	19.1 (66.4)	13.7 (56.7)	20.8 (69.4)
Daily mean °C (°F)	7.8 (46.0)	8.4 (47.1)	11.1 (52.0)	15.5 (59.9)	20.2 (68.4)	23.7 (74.7)	27.1 (80.8)	27.6 (81.7)	25.0 (77.0)	20.6 (69.1)	15.9 (60.6)	10.5 (50.9)	17.8 (64.0)
Mean daily minimum °C (°F)	5.5 (41.9)	6.2 (43.2)	8.8 (47.8)	13.2 (55.8)	18.0 (64.4)	21.9 (71.4)	25.3 (77.5)	25.6 (78.1)	22.8 (73.0)	18.2 (64.8)	13.6 (56.5)	8.0 (46.4)	15.6 (60.1)
Record low °C (°F)	−4.5 (23.9)	−3.3 (26.1)	−2.0 (28.4)	3.3 (37.9)	7.7 (45.9)	12.8 (55.0)	17.5 (63.5)	18.8 (65.8)	15.5 (59.9)	7.8 (46.0)	0.7 (33.3)	−4.5 (23.9)	−4.5 (23.9)
Average precipitation mm (inches)	58.6 (2.31)	75.9 (2.99)	134.1 (5.28)	121.5 (4.78)	149.5 (5.89)	202.1 (7.96)	107.2 (4.22)	194.7 (7.67)	159.5 (6.28)	54.7 (2.15)	69.3 (2.73)	56.8 (2.24)	1,383.9 (54.5)
Average precipitation days (≥ 0.1 mm)	11.3	13.0	17.1	15.7	14.9	15.8	9.8	12.7	10.6	6.5	9.9	9.4	146.7
Average snowy days	1.4	1.3	0.4	0	0	0	0	0	0	0	0	0.6	3.7
Average relative humidity (%)	72	76	80	83	86	90	89	86	79	73	73	69	80
Mean monthly sunshine hours	104.4	95.3	109.2	120.6	128.4	118.6	220.4	220.0	178.9	180.4	127.4	125.4	1,729
Percentage possible sunshine	32	30	29	31	31	29	52	54	49	51	40	39	39
Source: China Meteorological Administration all-time extreme temperatures all-time July and September highs All-time Oct extreme

== Economy ==
Yuhuan's economy is driven by its manufacturing sector. A famous local brand is Supor cookware. Huaneng Yuhuan Power Station is a large coal-fired power station with 4,000 MW output capacity. Dried shrimp shell is a major export of Yuhuan, achieving 130 million yuan worth of domestic export in 2024, and 95.5 million yuan globally.

== People and culture ==
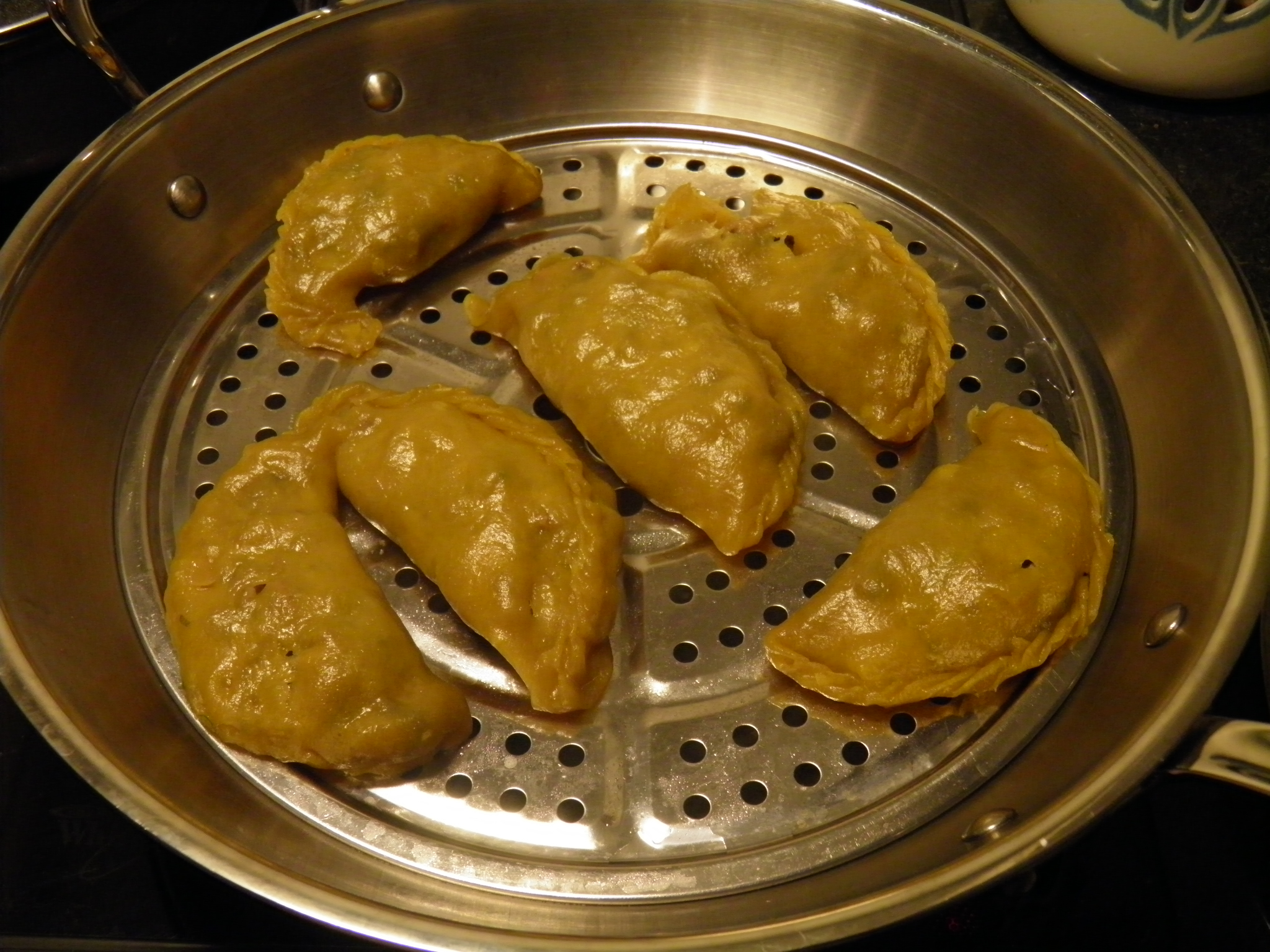
Fānshǔyuán (番薯圆), or a sweet potato bun, a local specialty.

Due to its location on the shores of the East China Sea, use of plenty of fresh seafood is characteristic for Yuhuanese cuisine. A local variety of pomelo is widely grown, known as buntan in min and wendan in wu dialect.

The county has an especially divisive contrast between the local elite and migrants from other regions of China. Most physical labourers and low-wage jobs are held by migrants while most local businesses are controlled in the hands of natives of the county.

The county is very diverse linguistically. The majority speak a form of the Taizhou dialect (a form of Wu), while the villages of Chenyu and Kanmen are home to a Minnan-speaking population, whose ancestors migrated to this region from Fujian in the late 1800s. Wenzhounese is also spoken in the region. The three languages are noticeably different and are not mutually intelligible amongst each other or with Mandarin, the official language of China. It is not unusual for a local to speak more than one local dialect and passable Mandarin.

== See also ==
- Archives of Yuhuan
- The Taizhou Museum displays a section about the customs and festivals of this city.
- Yuhuan Library
