= Lupu, Yuhuan =

Town of Yuhuan City, Province of Zhejiang, People's Republic of China

Lupu 芦浦镇
- Town
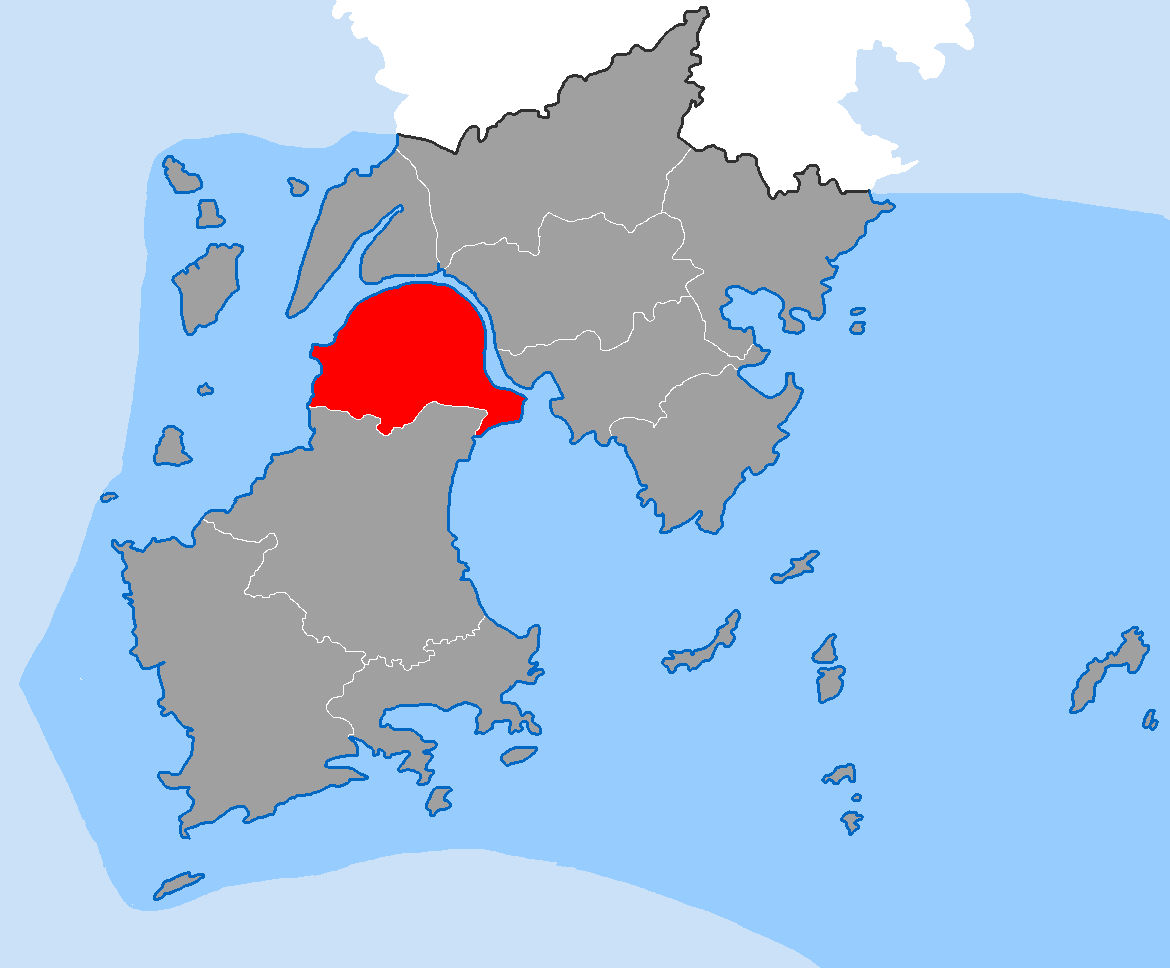
- Interactive map of Lupu
- Country: China
- Province: Zhejiang
- City: Taizhou
- County: Yuhuan
- Administrative division code: 33 10 83 106 000
- Time zone: UTC+8 (China Standard)
- Area code: +86 (0)576

Lupu (Chinese: 芦浦镇) is a town under the jurisdiction of Yuhuan County, Taizhou City, Zhejiang Province, People's Republic of China.

== History ==
Lupu Town is located at the northern end of Yuhuan Island, adjacent to Leqing Bay, and facing Yandang Mountain across the sea. Lupu was originally a strait with reeds growing along the shore. There is a mountain ridge to the south called Luao (芦岙), and in the southeast part of the intertidal zone, there is a large inlet called Shenpu (深浦 or Chenpu 琛浦).

In the sixth year of the Qing Yongzheng reign (1728), when Yuhuan Hall (玉环厅) was established, there were Luao Village (芦岙村) and Chenpu Village (琛浦村). In the 23rd year of the Republic of China (1934), they were renamed Luao Township (芦岙乡) and Shapu Township (沙浦乡). In the 28th year of the Republic of China (1939), they were collectively called Lupu Township (芦浦乡). After the founding of the People's Republic of China, a salt special zone was established, which administered Luao Township, Shenpu Township, etc. In 1956, Luao Township, Jingtou Township, and Shenpu Township were merged, and the name Lupu, taking one character each from Luao and Shenpu, was adopted, later changed to Lupu Commune (芦浦公社). In 1984, Lupu Township was re-established. In 1994, it was changed to Lupu Town.

== Administrative division ==
Lupu Town administers the following village-level administrative units:

Xuanmen Village, Daotou Village, Geling Village, Xiaotangyan Village, Datang Village, Jinshan Village, Jingtou Village, Fenshui Village, Hongshan Village, Lubei Village, Lu Ao Village, and Xitang Village.

== Industry and production ==
The industries in Lupu Town mainly involve pharmaceutical packaging rubber processing, auto parts, valves, imitation leather soles, etc., but the only characteristic industries that have actually formed a certain scale are pharmaceutical packaging and marine aquaculture. In 1978, Lupu Salt Field was established, belonging to Zhejiang Province's standard salt field, with 80 hectares of salt fields and a production of 4,000 tons of crude salt in 1988. In 1971, Yuhuan County Firecracker Craft Factory was established, mainly producing electric firecrackers. In 1985, it ranked first in Zhejiang Province and fifth in China. Lupu was then known as the "hometown of firecrackers".

== Agriculture ==
The paddy fields in Lupu Town mainly grow rice, while the reclaimed land grows sweet potatoes, vegetables, melons, and fruits. In order to expand the planting area of food crops, 18 hectares of paddy fields were built on reclaimed land from 1987 to 1988 for rice cultivation. In addition, local village enterprises engage in fisheries production, including grouper, yellow croaker, perch, sea bream, razor shells, prawn, etc. Local residents also plant various varieties of peach trees, citrus, pomelo, blood oranges, navel oranges, grapes, bayberries, etc., in the mountains and forests.

== Education and culture ==
There is currently one primary school in Lupu Town. Cultural facilities include cultural stations, radio stations, video halls, and cinemas. The "Ji En Poem" cliff inscriptions and the "Holy Teachings Poem" cliff inscriptions are both listed as cultural relics protection units in Zhejiang Province.

== Gallery ==
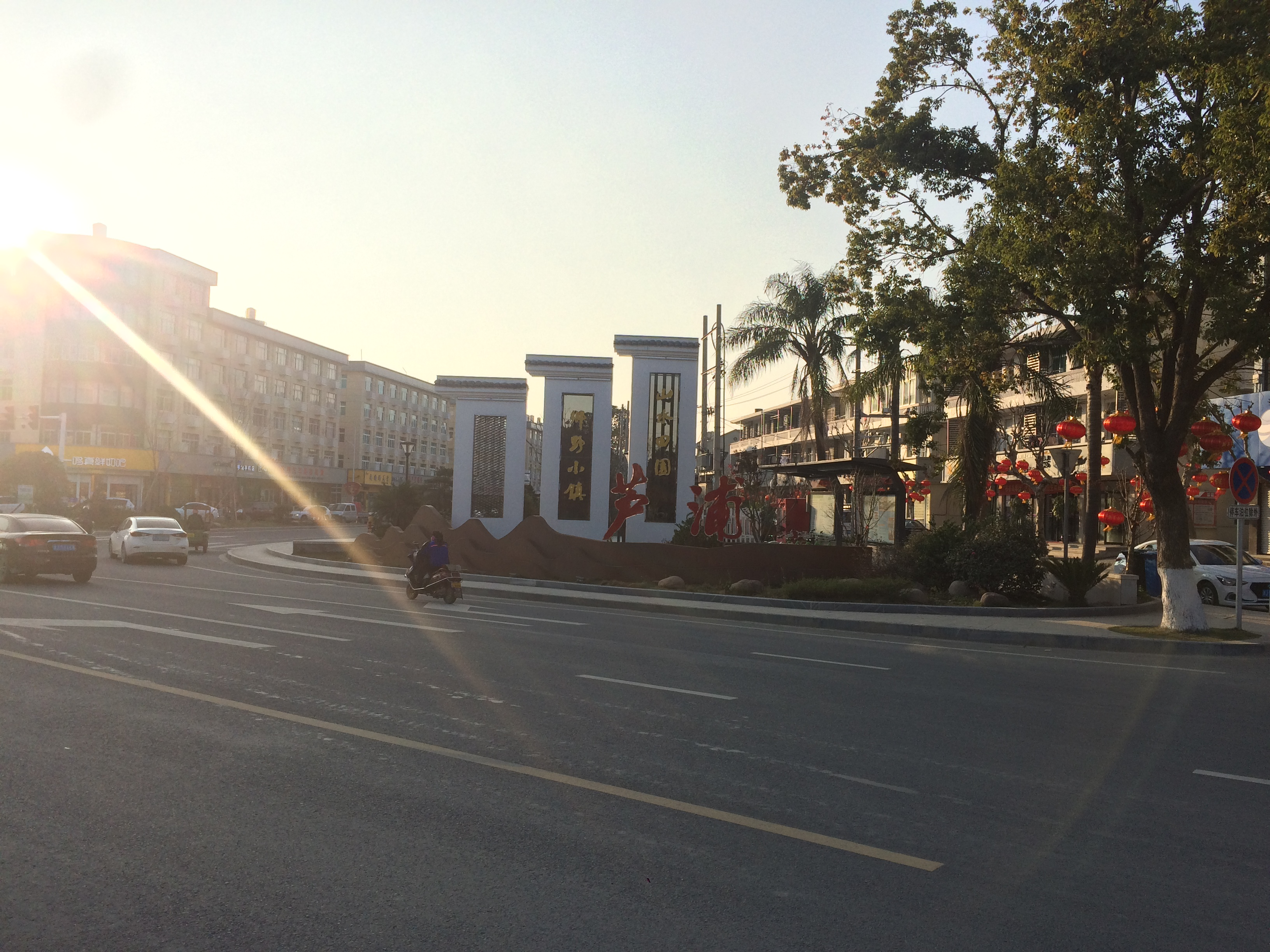
Welcome sculpture of Lupu Town.

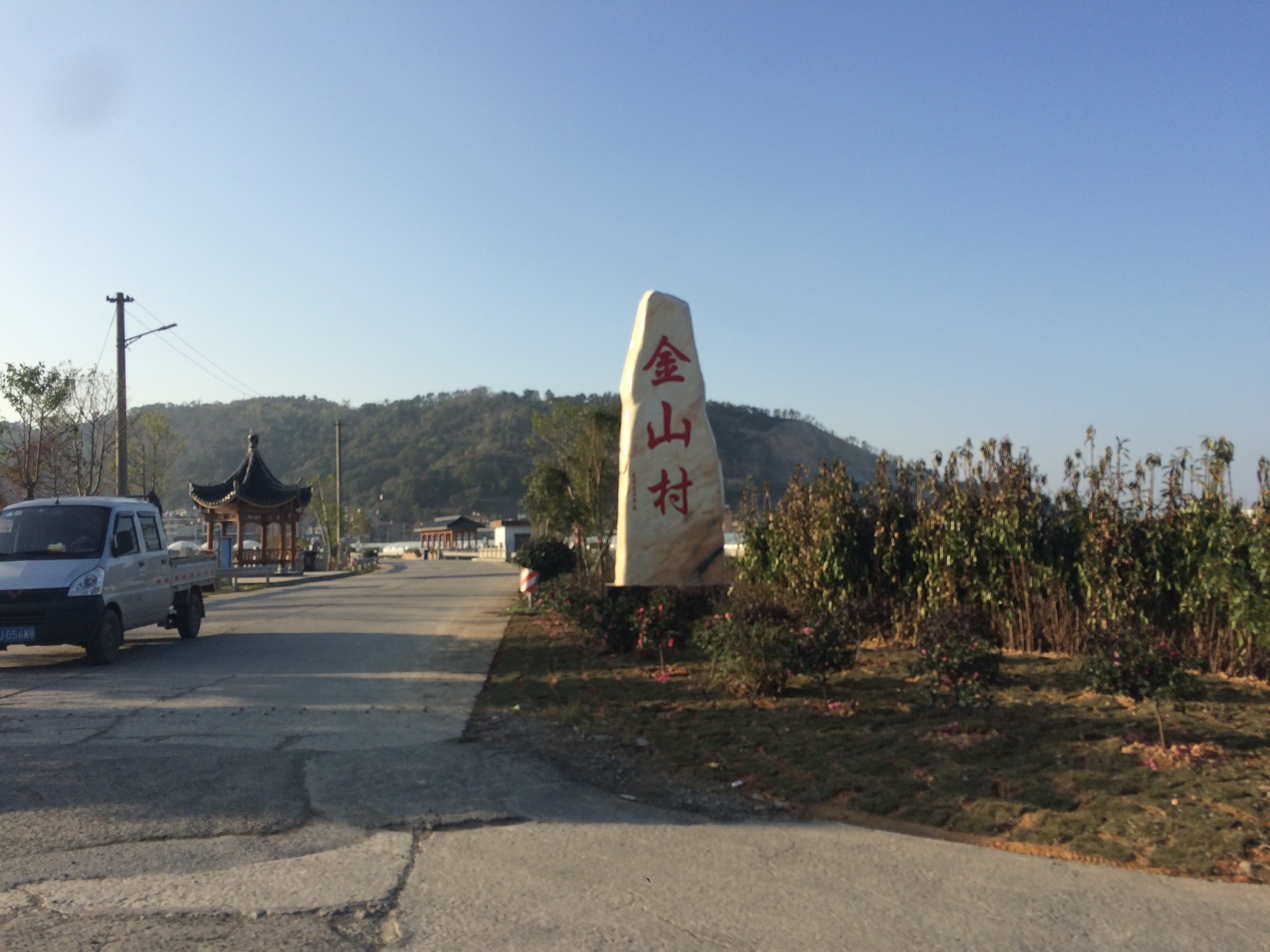
Jinshan Village.

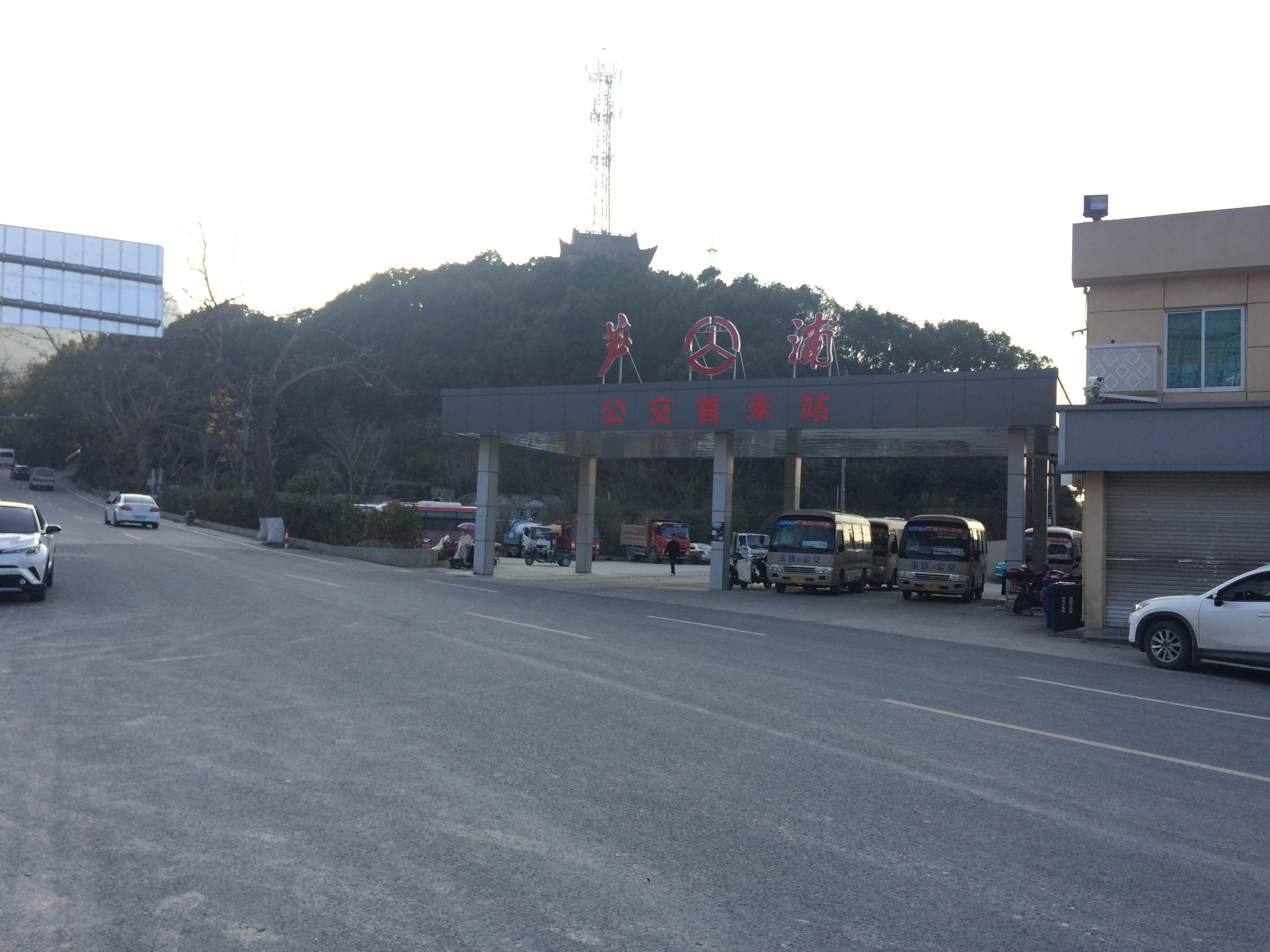
Lupu Bus Station.

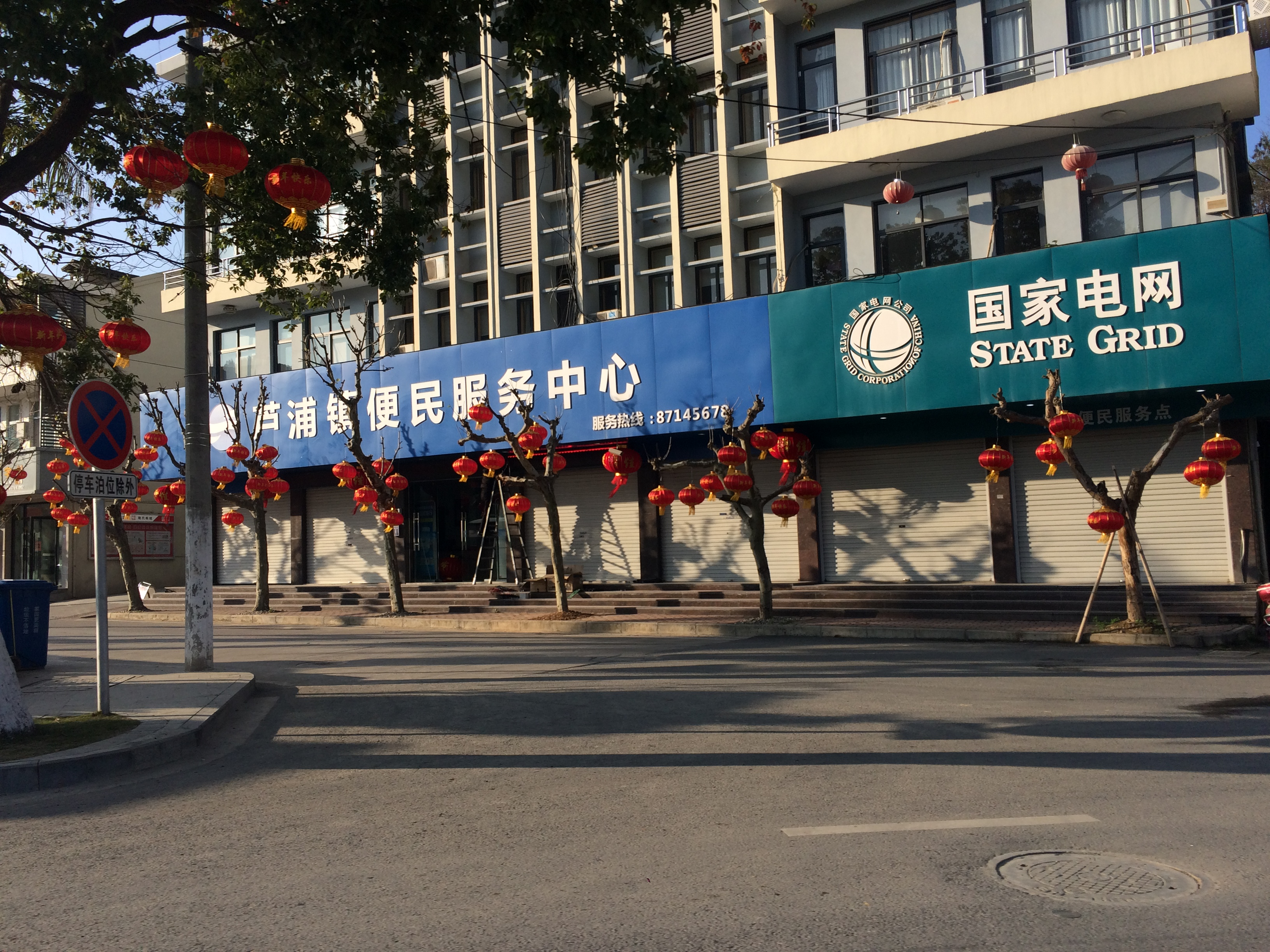
Convenience Service Center of Lupu Town, Yuhuan.

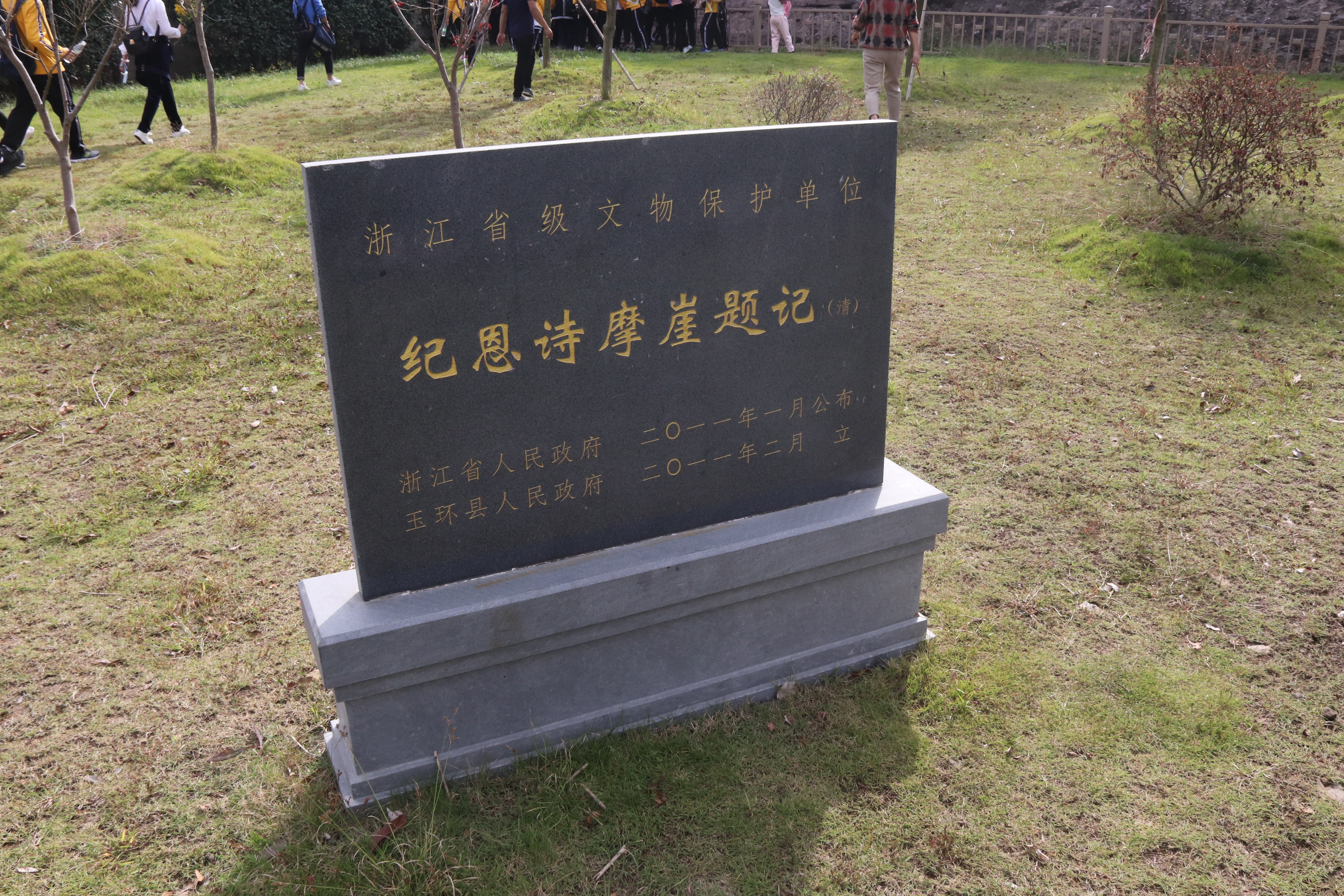
"Ji En Poem" inscription on the cliff.

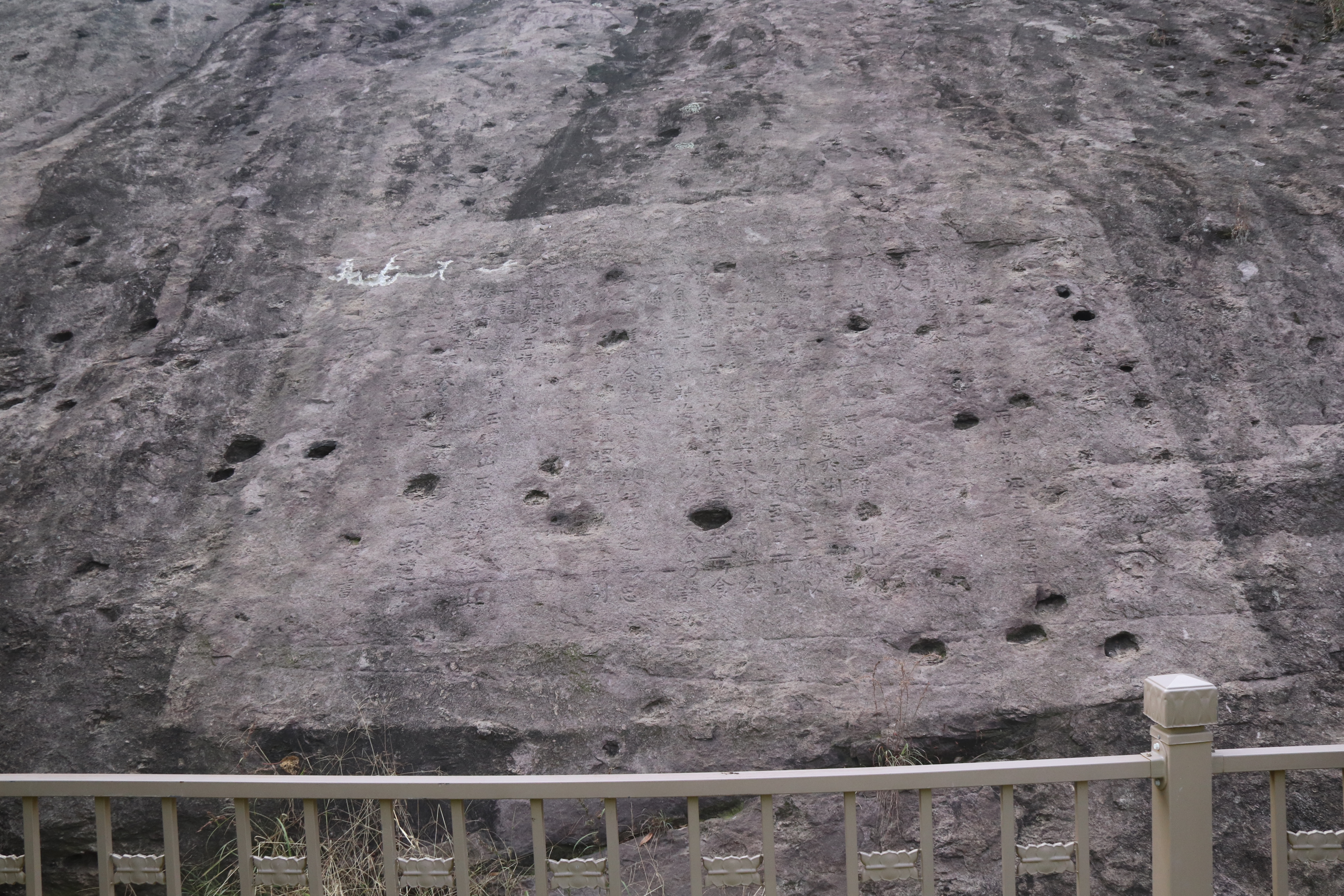
"Ji En Poem" inscription on the cliff.
