= Qinggang, Zhejiang =

Town in Yuhuan, Zhejiang, People's Republic of China

Qinggang 清港镇
- Town
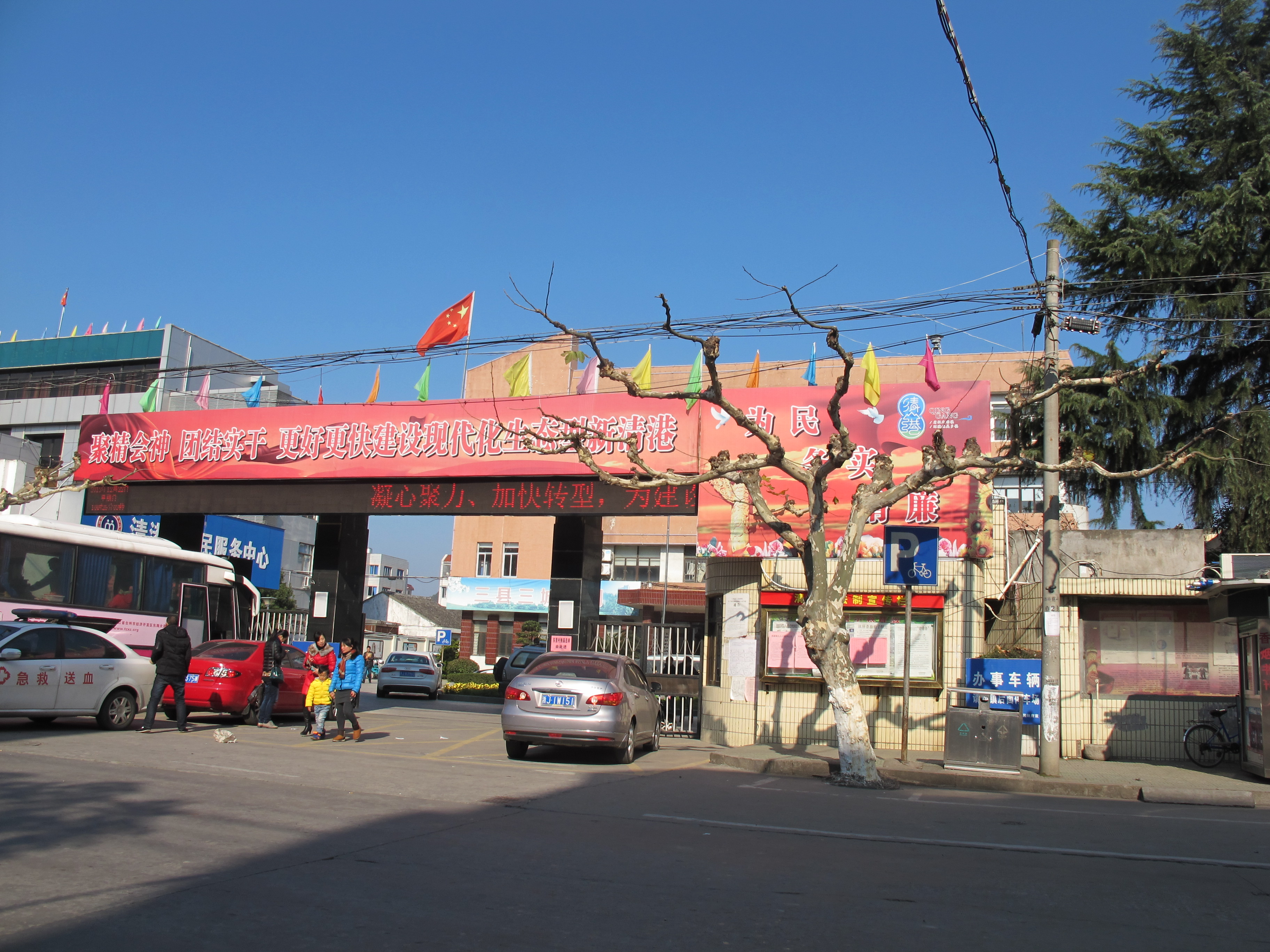
- Qinggang Town People's Government
- Interactive map of Qinggang
- Coordinates: 28.25379°N 121.28280°E
- Country: China
- Administrative region: Yuhuan
- Administrative divisions: 42 (2 residential communities, 40 villages)

Area
  - Total: 53.6 km^{2} (20.7 sq mi)
- Time zone: UTC+8 (China Standard)
- Postal code: 317600
- Administrative division code: 331083101000
- Area code: +86 (0)576

Qinggang (Chinese: 清港镇; pinyin: Qīnggǎng Zhèn) is a town under the jurisdiction of the city of Yuhuan, prefecture of Taizhou, Zhejiang Province, People's Republic of China.

== History ==
Qinggang is located in the northwest of the Chumen Peninsula. It is bordered to the north by Chengnan Town, Wenling City, to the southeast by Shamen Town, to the south by Chumen Town, and to the west by Leqing Bay. It covers an area of 53.6 square kilometers, with a cultivated area of 1780 mu, and belongs to the mountainous area. The old name of Qinggang Town's sea port was "Gugang" (古港). It was renamed Qinggang (清港) during the Yuan Dynasty and has remnants of Qinggang Ferry. In the 14th year of the Hongwu period of the Ming Dynasty (1381), Qinggang (清港里) was established. During the Guangxu period of the Qing Dynasty, Qinggang Village (清港村) was established. In 1934, it was changed to Qinggang Township (清港乡). In 1936, it was changed to Qinggang Town (清港镇). After the founding of the People's Republic of China, the name Qinggang Town was maintained. In March 1991, Qinggang District (清港区) was established. However, it was abolished in May 1992, and villages such as Shangjiao, Xiajiao, Houpai, and Yuanjia were incorporated into Qinggang Town.

== Administrative divisions ==
Qinggang is divided into the following village-level administrative units:

Qingnan Community, Qingbei Community, Qinggang Village, Xiaqiao Village, Shangqiao Village, Houpai Village, Yuanjia Village, Shuangjiatang Village, Shaowa Village, Tangtou Village, Xudou Village, Xudu Village, Saizhoushan Village, Yangxin Village, Xialing Village, Hexin Village, Tanpu Village, Wangjia Village, Fanshen Village, Fanhong Village, Yanye Village, Fanhai Village, Taishan Village, Xiafan Village, Shangfan Village, Shangshan Village, Yanggen Village, Zhangao Village, Qianzhao Village, Fangdou Village, Chatou Village, Jiaoxi Village, Xiaoao Village, Xilin Village, Zhongzhao Village, Qianlu Village, Zhujiaqian Village, Baitai Village, Xiaolu Village, Daleitou Village, Jiuzhitian Village, and Dongli Village.

== Economy ==
Qinggang is the main production area for Yuhuan Wen Dan (a type of citrus fruit).

== Culture ==
There is a site of the Taishan Village locally, where Ruan Luce, a general under Zheng Chenggong, built city walls here. Every February 19th, the Qinggang Temple Fair is held, which originates from the birthday celebration of Qinggang Niangniang Palace, starting on the 15th day of the lunar second month and ending on the 19th day of the lunar second month. The temple fair is held annually, with a Niángniáng parade held once every three years.

== Gallery ==
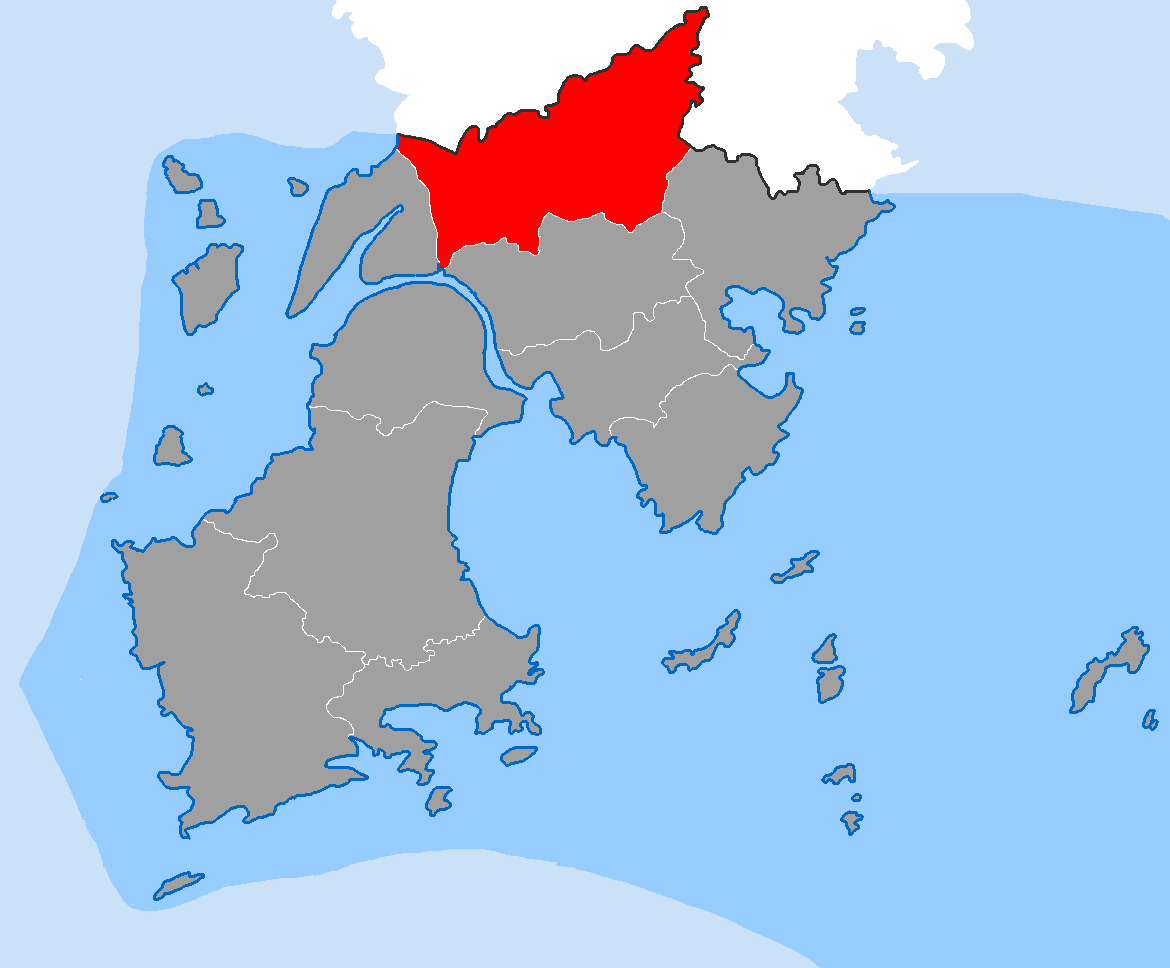
Location of Qinggang Town in Yuhuan.

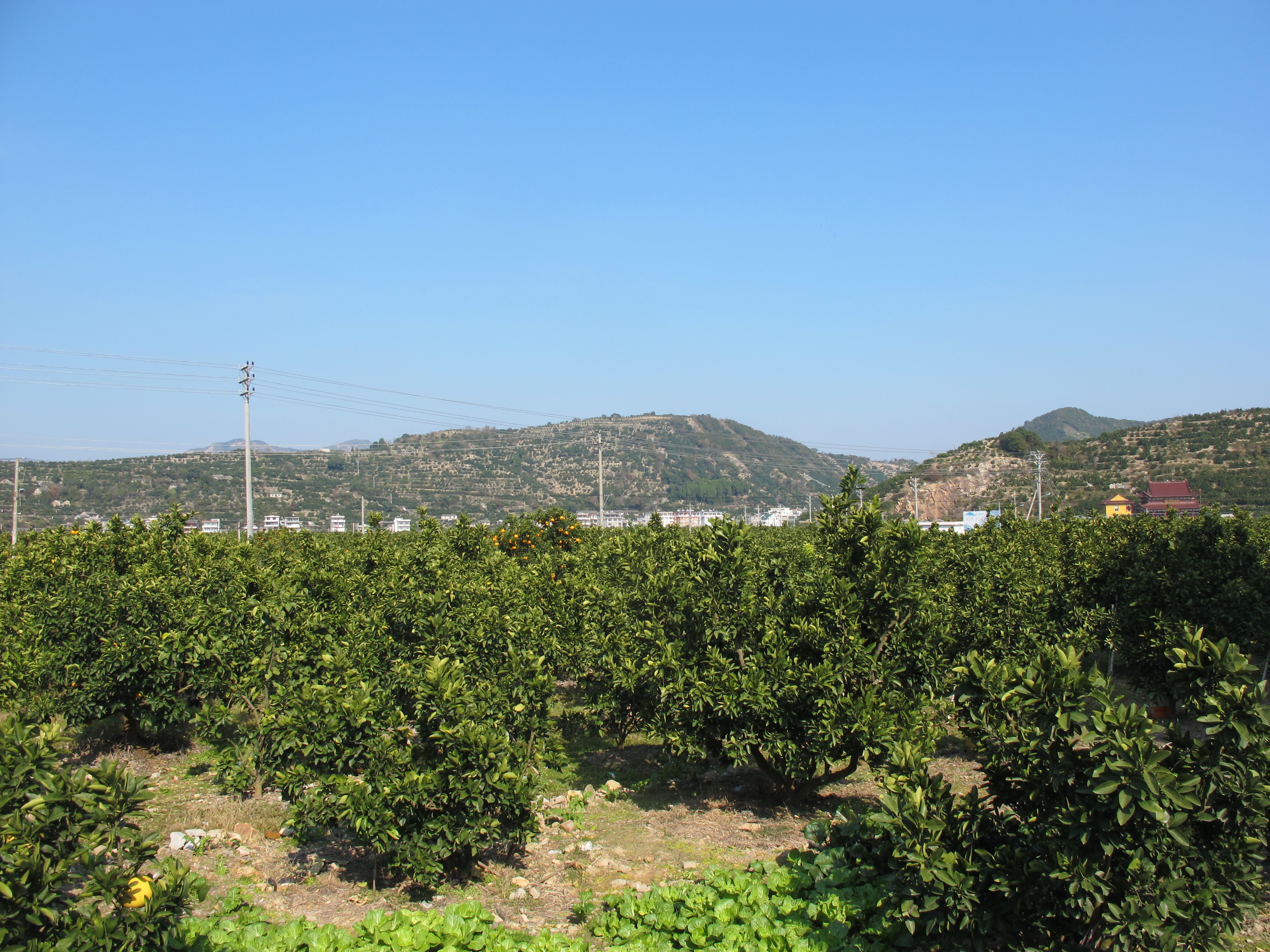
Tangerine orchard in Yanggen Village.

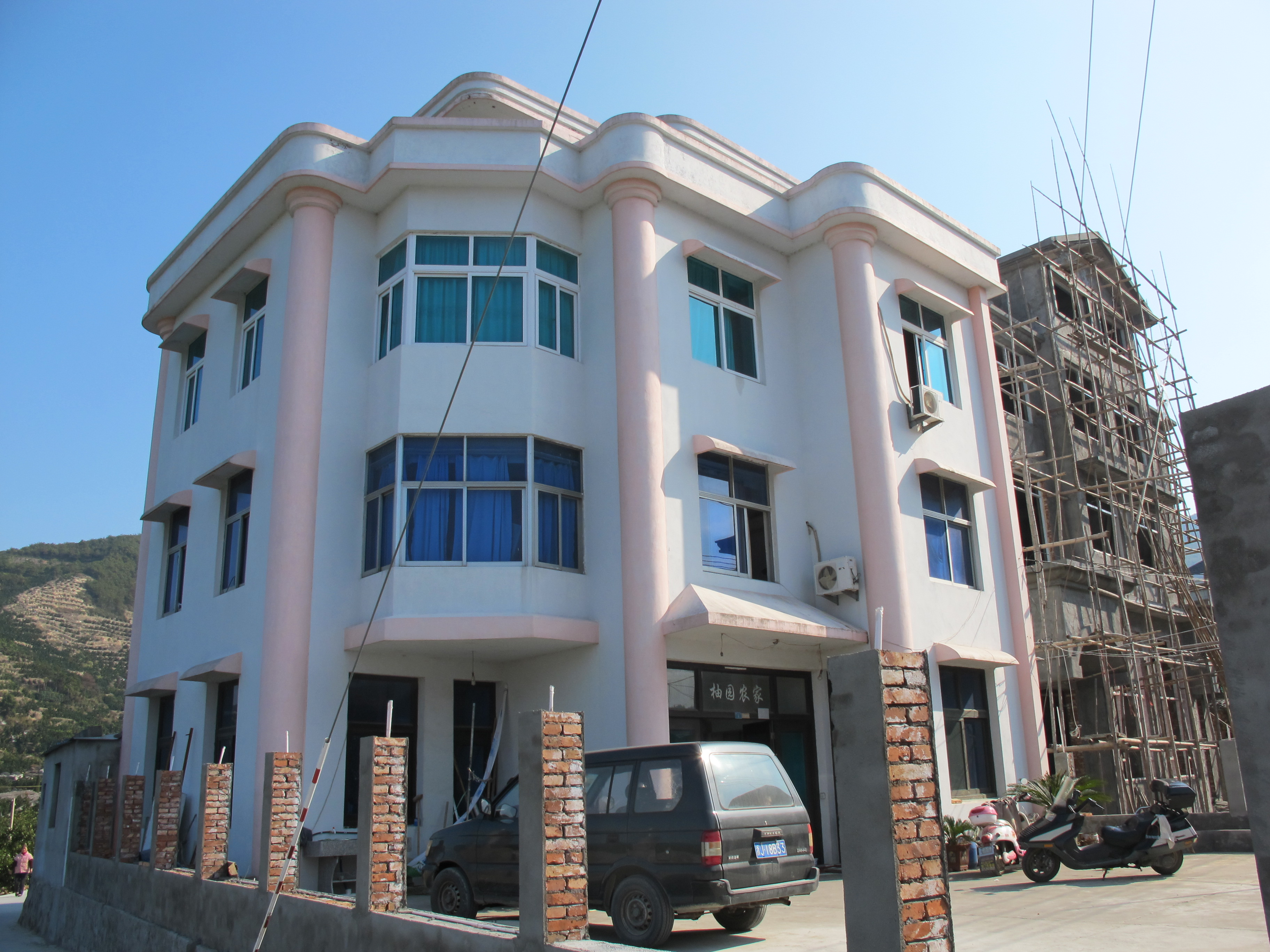
Houses in Yanggen Village.

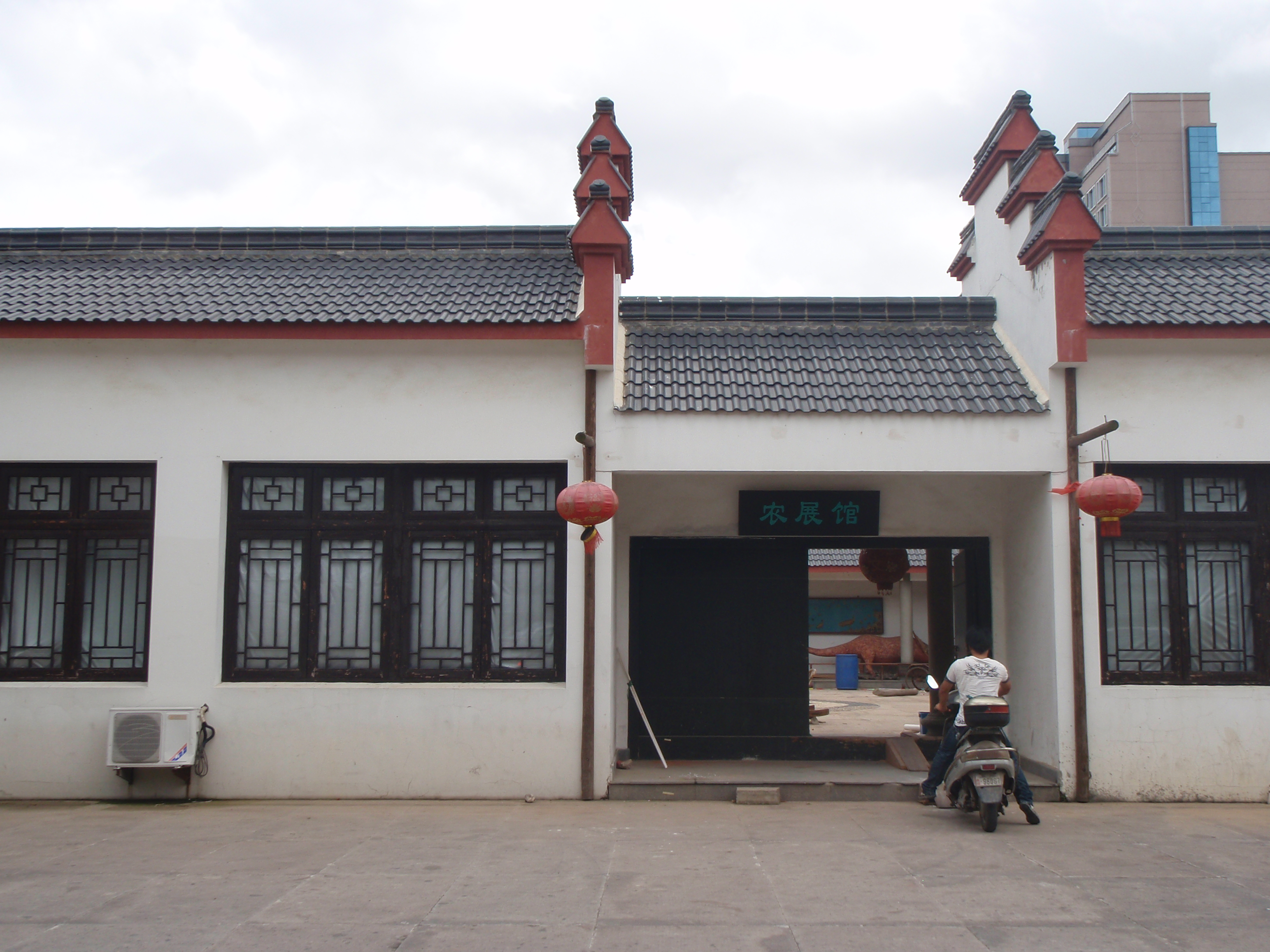
Agricultural Exhibition Hall of Yuhuan Xuanmen Bay Tourist Agriculture Park.

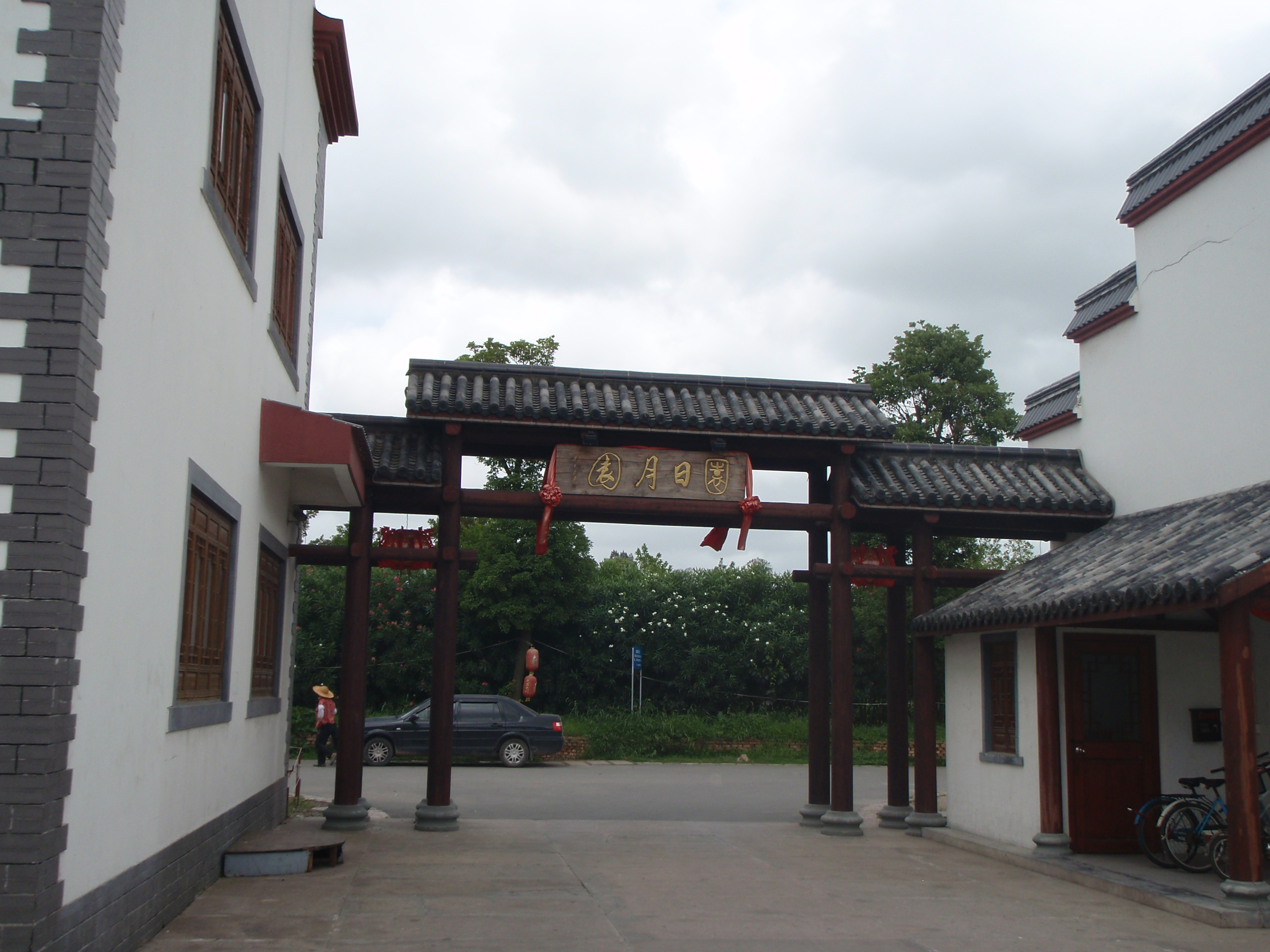
Entrance gate of the Sun and Moon Garden Hotel inside the Yuhuan Tourist Agriculture Park.

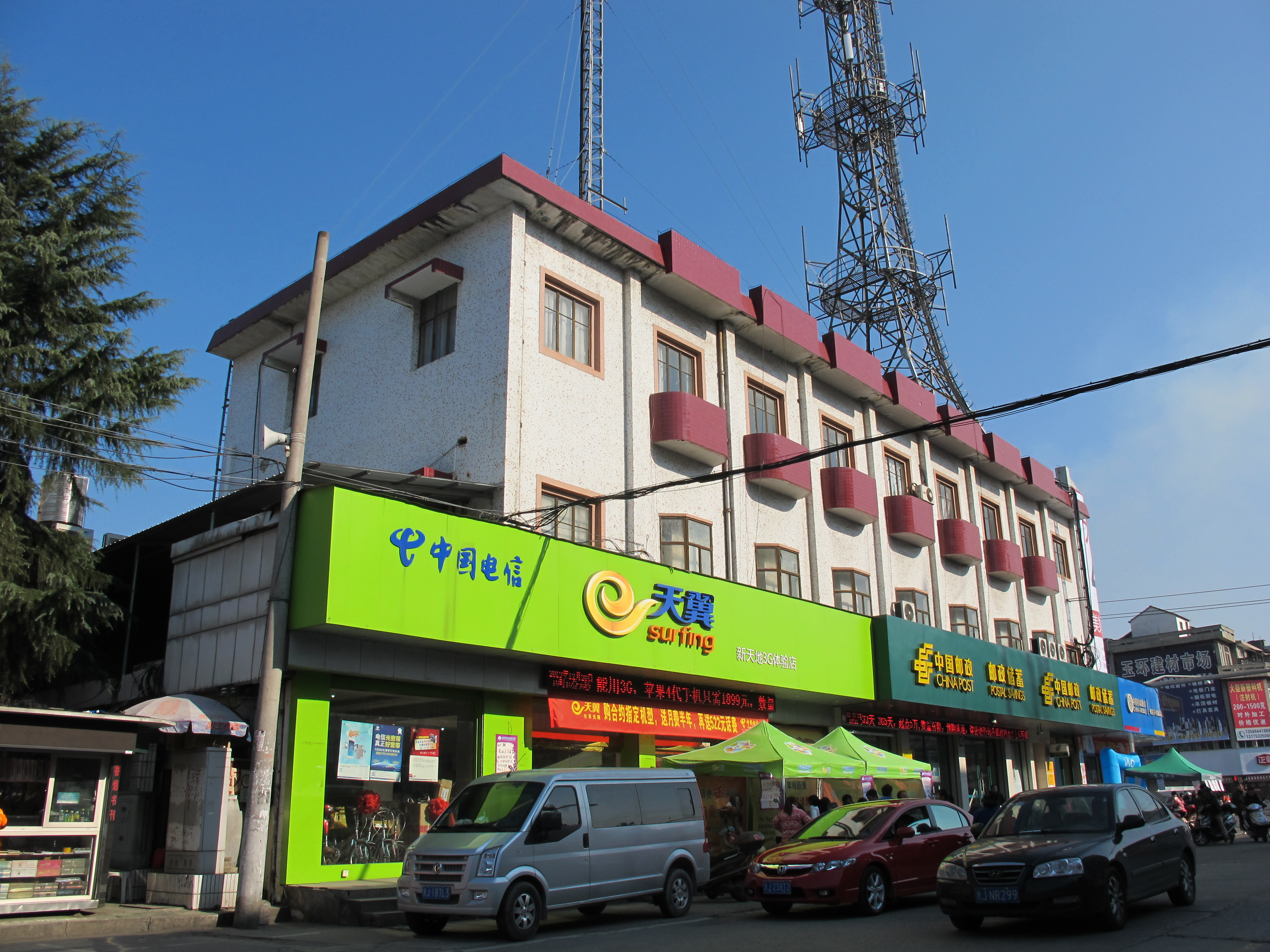
Telecommunications office of Qinggang.

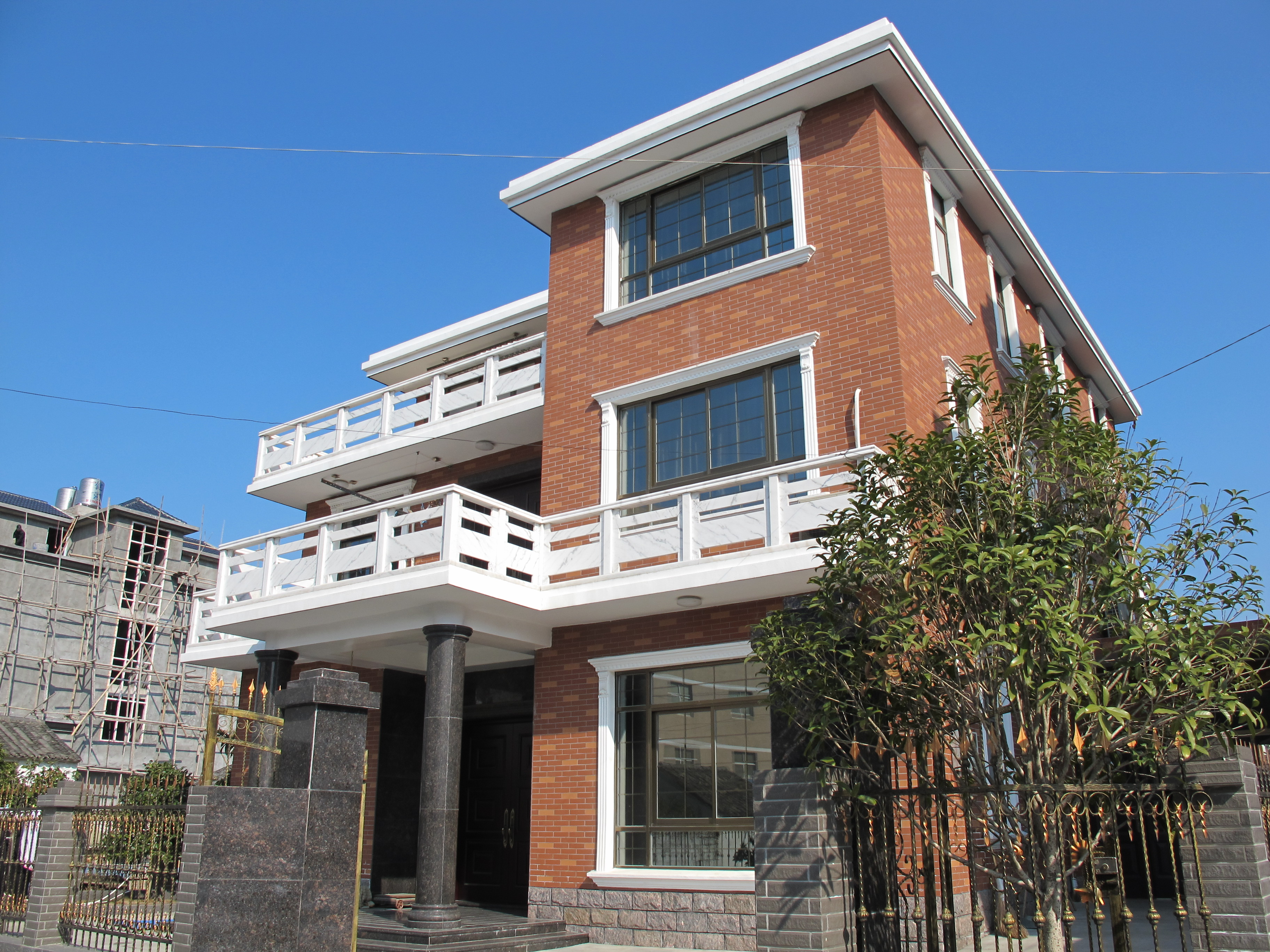
Houses of Yanggen Village.

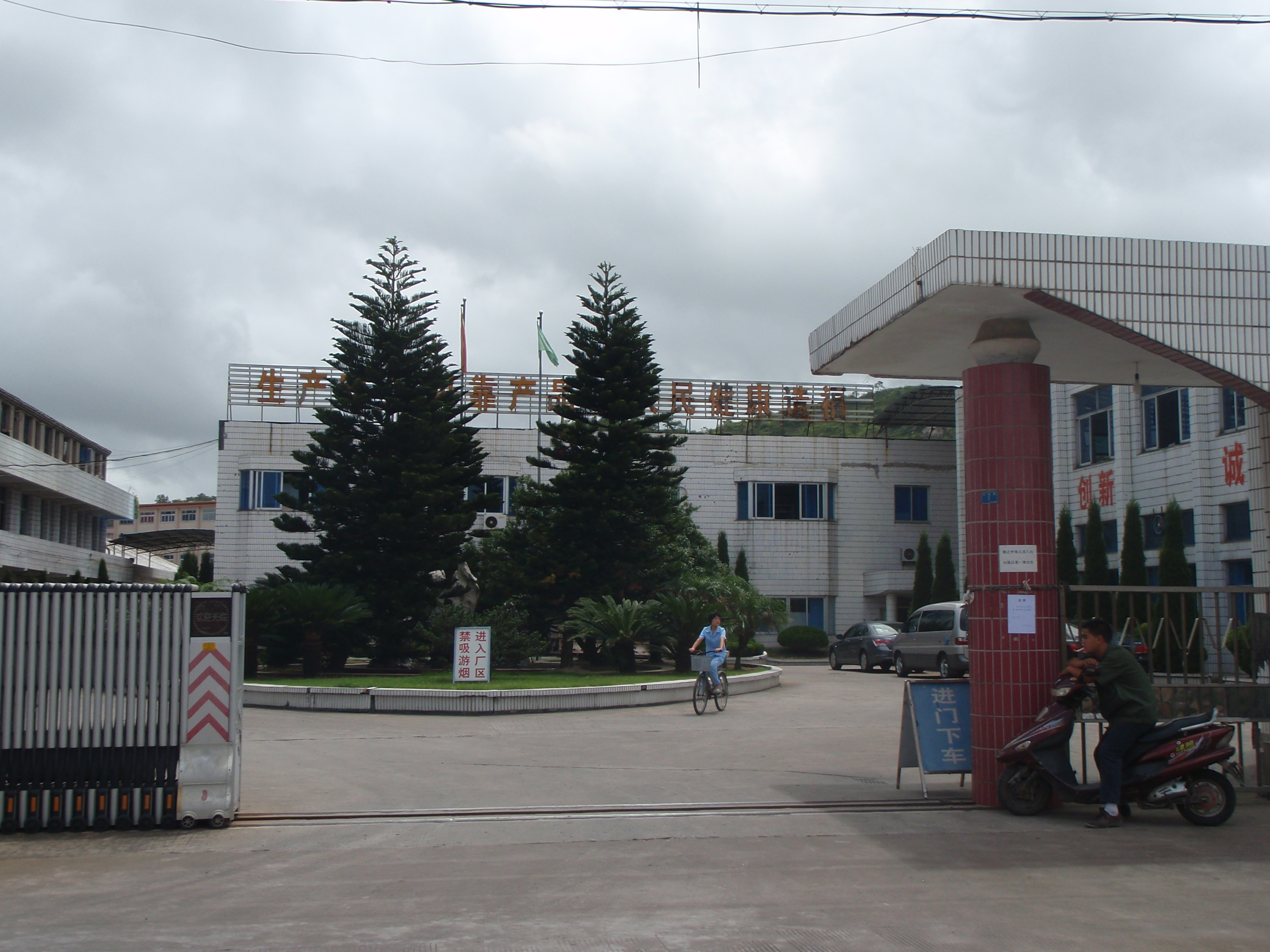
Zhejiang Jinghuan Medical Supplies Co., Ltd.
