= Chumen =

Chumen 楚门镇
- Town
- Location in Zhejiang
- Coordinates: 28°13′11″N 121°17′36″E
- Country: People's Republic of China
- Province: Zhejiang
- Prefecture-level city: Taizhou
- County-level city: Yuhuan

Government
  - Mayor: Lin Hang

Area
  - Total: 37.5 km^{2} (14.5 sq mi)

Population
  - Total: 120,000
- Time zone: UTC+8 (China Standard)
- Postal code: 317605
- Area code: 0576

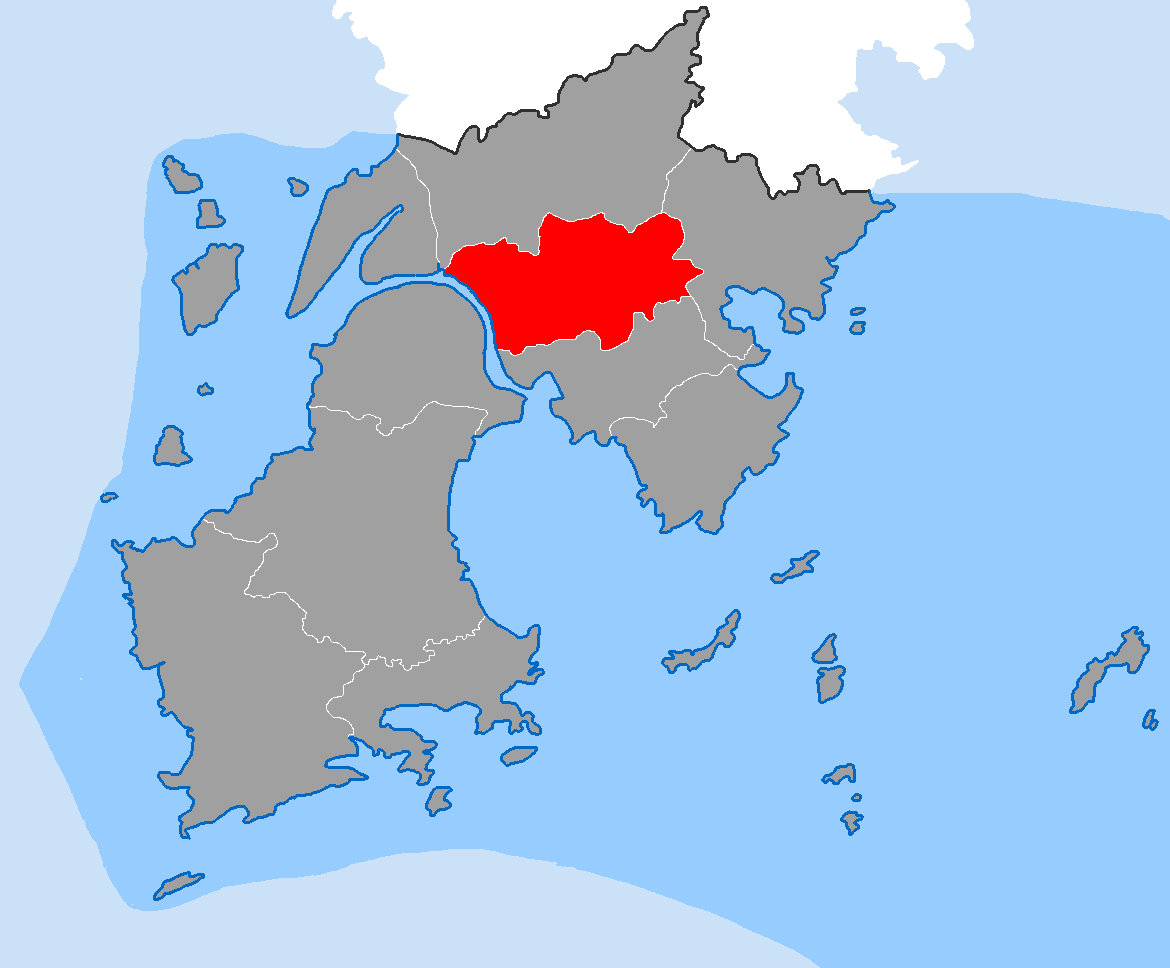
Map of Chumen Town (in red)

Chumen (simplified Chinese: 楚门; traditional Chinese: 楚門; pinyin: Chǔmén) is a town under the jurisdiction of Yuhuan, Taizhou, Zhejiang province, China. It is the hometown of China's pomelo. Chumen is situated in the north of Yuhuan and in the heart of the peninsula. Chumen's area is 37.5km^{2} (14.5mi²) and as of 2018 there are 18 villages and 3 residential committees under its authority.

== History ==
In the ancient times Chumen was under the sea where Mount Yaji (丫髻山) and Mount Xiqing (西青山) formed an estuary. It later rose above sea level when the Yuan dynasty (1341–1367) government enclosed the tideland for cultivation. The town was named after the cluster of Chu trees (Vitex) that grew there.

During the Hongwu Emperor's reign (1368–1398) in the Ming dynasty (1368–1644), he had his imperial army build the town in 1387, and Chumen was first administered by Yueqing County. During the reign of the Ming dynasty Chenghua Emperor (reigned 1464–1487), it became part of Taiping County in 1476. Chumen was governed by Yuhuan officials beginning in 1728, during the Yongzheng Emperor's reign (1722–1735) in the Qing dynasty (1644–1912). During the Republican period (1912–1949), Chumen was reclassified as a town belonging to Yuhuan County. In May 1992, the townships of Tian Ma and Waitang merged into what is now known as Chumen.

== See also ==
- List of township-level divisions of Zhejiang
