= Yuhuan paper-cutting =

Style of Chinese paper-cutting

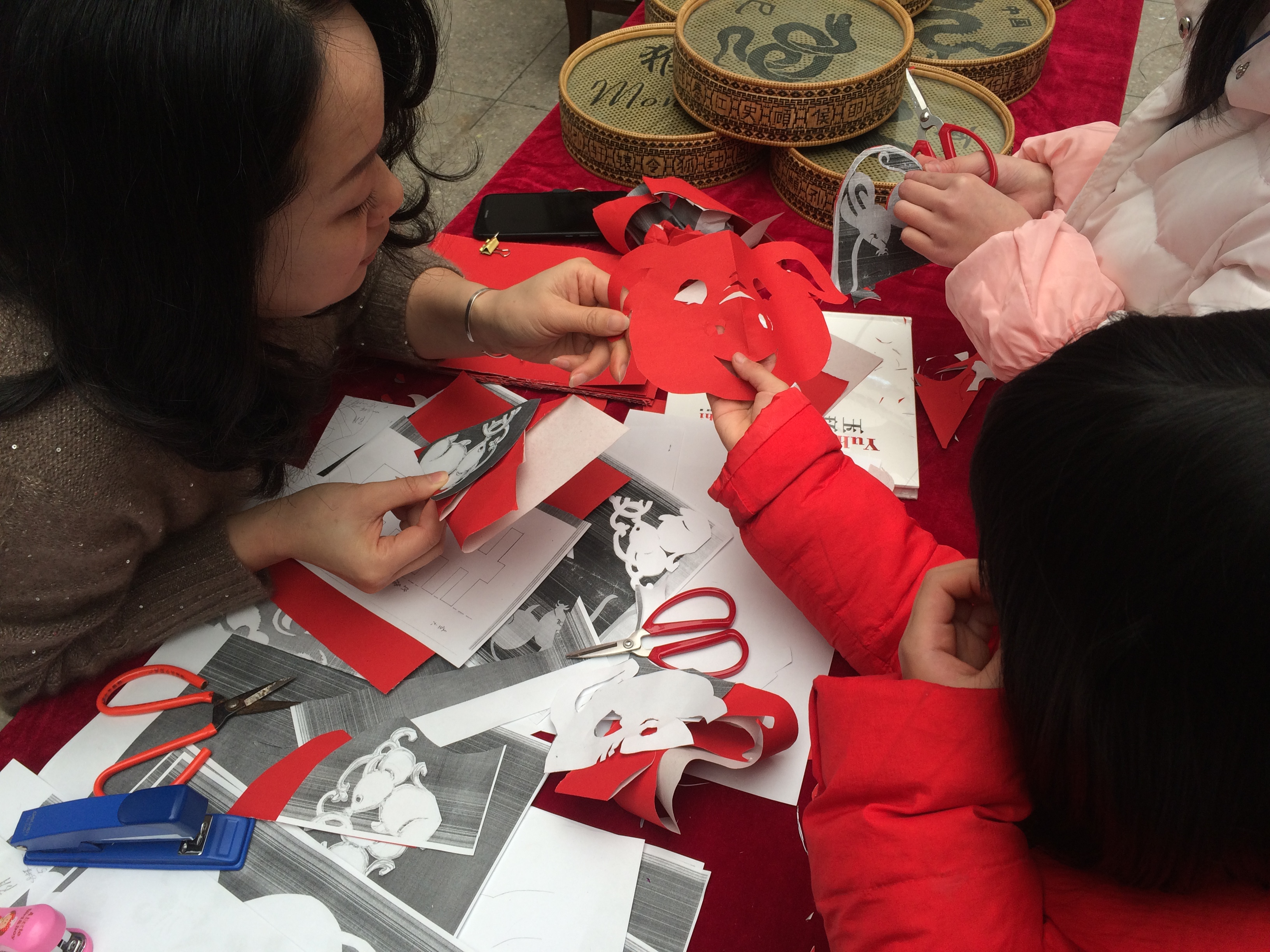
At an exhibition in Yuhuan Library, a woman teaches a child paper-cutting.

Yuhuan paper-cutting is a style of Chinese paper-cutting originating from Yuhuan, Zhejiang Province, China. It is classified as part of the Southern school of Chinese paper-cutting and dates back to the Ming and Qing dynasties. From the 1960s, Yuhuan paper-cutting developed into a commercial craft industry and reached its peak in the 1970s. At its height, more than 3,000 people were engaged in production, and the craft became an important export-oriented handicraft industry in the region. During the 1980s, the industry declined due to economic restructuring and the closure of production enterprises. It was later recognised as part of China’s intangible cultural heritage.

Yuhuan paper-cutting is characterised by a combination of cutting and colouring techniques, as well as integrated cutting and mounting methods. It is known for its varied forms, concise lines, and vivid colours. It is considered one of the representative styles of Southern Chinese paper-cutting, alongside the traditions of Yangzhou, Jiangsu; Foshan, Guangdong; and Yueqing, Zhejiang. In June 2012, it was included in the fourth batch of the Zhejiang Provincial Intangible Cultural Heritage list.

== History ==
Yuhuan has long been known as the 'home of paper-cutting'. The local folk paper-cutting tradition in Yuhuan dates back to the Ming and Qing dynasties. In mainland China, traditional paper-cutting art is generally divided into Northern and Southern schools. Northern-style paper-cutting is simple and bold, while Southern-style paper-cutting is influenced by Southern culture and is more delicate and refined. Yuhuan paper-cutting belongs to the Southern school, emphasising refined patterns and smooth lines, and is known for its aesthetic qualities described as 'graceful, lively, gentle, and elegant'. During the Republic of China period, paper-cutting was widely practised in Yuhuan, with paper-cutting stalls found throughout both urban and rural areas. In the 1950s, a paper-cutting stall in Shanwazhang Village, Longxi Township, gained local recognition. At the same time, a large number of Yuhuan paper-cutting works were published in newspapers and journals. Yuhuan paper-cutting has produced several notable early practitioners. Among them, Lin Cai'e (1900–unknown; alternatively 1898–unknown) is regarded as a representative figure of early Yuhuan paper-cutting. From approximately the age of 35, she operated a stall selling paper-cut pattern designs near the West Gate archway in the county seat. Her designs were widely sought after for their fine detail and embroidery suitability. Han Wei (born 1934) was a painter who began practising paper-cutting in 1950 and published widely in newspapers and magazines. Other early representative figures of Yuhuan paper-cutting include Wang Kexun, Zhao Xincan, Xu Ailin, Wang Shanheng, Chen Binfei, Weng Chuncai, and Han Xiaoben.

From the 1960s, craft cooperatives and arts and crafts factories were established in Chumen, Kanmen, Longyan (now part of Longxi Township), and the county seat (now Yucheng Subdistrict), and paper-cutting gradually shifted toward commercial production. The 1970s marked the peak period of Yuhuan paper-cutting. In 1970, the Yuhuan County Arts and Crafts Factory was established in Kanmen, recruiting seven paper-cutting designers, including Xu Ailin. Nearly 100 factory workers and 2,000 to 3,000 commune members were engaged in paper-cutting production, and it became a household activity. The craft became an important source of income in Kanmen and was exported to Europe, the Americas, and Southeast Asia. Compared with earlier folk practices, the factory introduced innovation by first designing patterns and templates before cutting full compositions. The variety expanded to more than 100 types. Across Yuhuan, processing factories were distributed in Longyan, Fangdu (now part of Chumen Town), Mixi (now part of Longxi Township), Chumen, the county seat, Kanmen, and Chen'ao (now Damaiyu Subdistrict). At its peak, the industry employed more than 3,000 people and became an important pillar of Yuhuan's foreign trade. In the 1980s, the Yuhuan County Arts and Crafts Factory was closed, and Yuhuan paper-cutting declined. As a handicraft industry, it became economically unsustainable, and the transmission of skills weakened. It was not until 2005, when Yuhuan began investigating intangible cultural heritage, that paper-cutting regained attention.

== Content ==
Yuhuan paper-cutting features a wide range of themes, mainly including animals, flowers, human figures, landscapes, and folk stories. Depicted subjects include ancient court ladies, cultural heritage sites, animals, flowers and birds, Revolutionary opera stories, and revolutionary heroes. Yuhuan paper-cutting is divided into two types: scissor-cutting and knife-cutting. Scissor-cutting is done by cutting patterns directly on white paper.The works are then mounted on fabric and embroidered with multicoloured threads. Scissor-cut techniques allow the creation of symmetrical or continuous patterns such as flowers, insects, birds, fish, and shrimp. Practitioners are mostly women. Paper-cutting is done with scissors. Patterns are cut from white paper and pasted onto fabric as needed. Embroidery is done with multicoloured needles and threads. When using carving knives, the thumb and index finger hold the blade, the middle finger presses the paper, and the ring and little fingers support the hand. According to pre-drawn outlines, controlled force is applied, and the blade is kept at a 90-degree angle to the paper to produce smooth and fine lines. Knife-cut works can depict complex scenes such as human figures, pavilions, and buildings, and were often used in the Zhizha industry.

Over time, Yuhuan paper-cutting developed forms such as coloured and spot-coloured paper-cutting, as well as new formats, including bookmarks and greeting cards. Its technical features include the combination of cutting and dyeing, as well as integrated cutting and mounting techniques. It is characterised by varied forms, concise lines, and vivid colours, and is known for its refined carving techniques and distinctive aesthetic qualities. Within Southern Chinese paper-cutting traditions, Yuhuan paper-cutting is comparable to the styles of Yangzhou, Foshan, and Yueqing (alternatively, Yangzhou, Jiangsu; Jintan, Jiangsu; and Foshan, Guangdong). Although Yuhuan and Yueqing are geographically adjacent, their styles differ: Yueqing paper-cutting features denser linework, while Yuhuan paper-cutting is more concise in form.

== Preservation and transmission ==
In 2005, Yuhuan began surveys of intangible cultural heritage, and paper-cutting received renewed attention. At that time, only seven master craftsmen remained, and by 2015, only four were still alive. With economic development, paper-cutting became increasingly difficult to sustain as a livelihood, prompting many practitioners to leave the craft and prompting urgent preservation efforts. The representative inheritor of Yuhuan paper-cutting is Xu Ailin (1940–). He has taught paper-cutting techniques in Kanmen Middle School, Yuhuan Chengguan Central Primary School, Yuhuan Experimental School, and Longxi Central Primary School. In 2010, Yuhuan paper-cutting was included in the Taizhou municipal intangible cultural heritage list. In June 2012, it was included in the fourth batch of the Zhejiang Provincial Intangible Cultural Heritage list. On 7 June 2012, Xu Ailin was recognised as a representative inheritor of the Yuhuan County intangible cultural heritage project. Yuhuan Chengguan Central Primary School was designated as a Yuhuan Intangible Cultural Heritage Transmission Base on 8 June 2020. Yuhuan has also held paper-cutting exhibitions and lectures.

From the 2013 academic year onward, the 'Gongyiyuan' student association at Chengguan Central Primary School launched a 'marine paper-cutting' course. In March 2013, Kanmen Middle School established a paper-cutting club as part of its arts education program. In April, Xu Ailin was appointed as the club's instructor. On 30 May, the Yuhuan paper-cutting transmission base at Kanmen Middle School was officially established. In June 2014, during Cultural Heritage Month, Kanmen Middle School held an exhibition of student paper-cutting works at Yuhuan Library, which attracted significant public attention. On 28 November 2018, the “First Marine Culture Paper-cutting Competition Exhibition of Outstanding Works” was opened at Yuhuan Cultural Centre, jointly organised by the Paper-cutting Art Committee of the China Culture Promotion Society and the Yuhuan Municipal Government. The Yuhuan Intangible Cultural Heritage Protection Centre became a 'Zhejiang Marine Culture Paper-cutting Creation Base.' Based on this, in December 2019, the Yuhuan Municipal Bureau of Culture, Radio, Television, Tourism and Sports established the Hai Zhi Yun Yuhuan Paper-cutting Society, recruiting members through local media.
