= Archives of Yuhuan =

Archive in Taizhou, Zhejiang, China

Coordinates: 28.2219°N 121.2582°E

- 玉环市档案馆
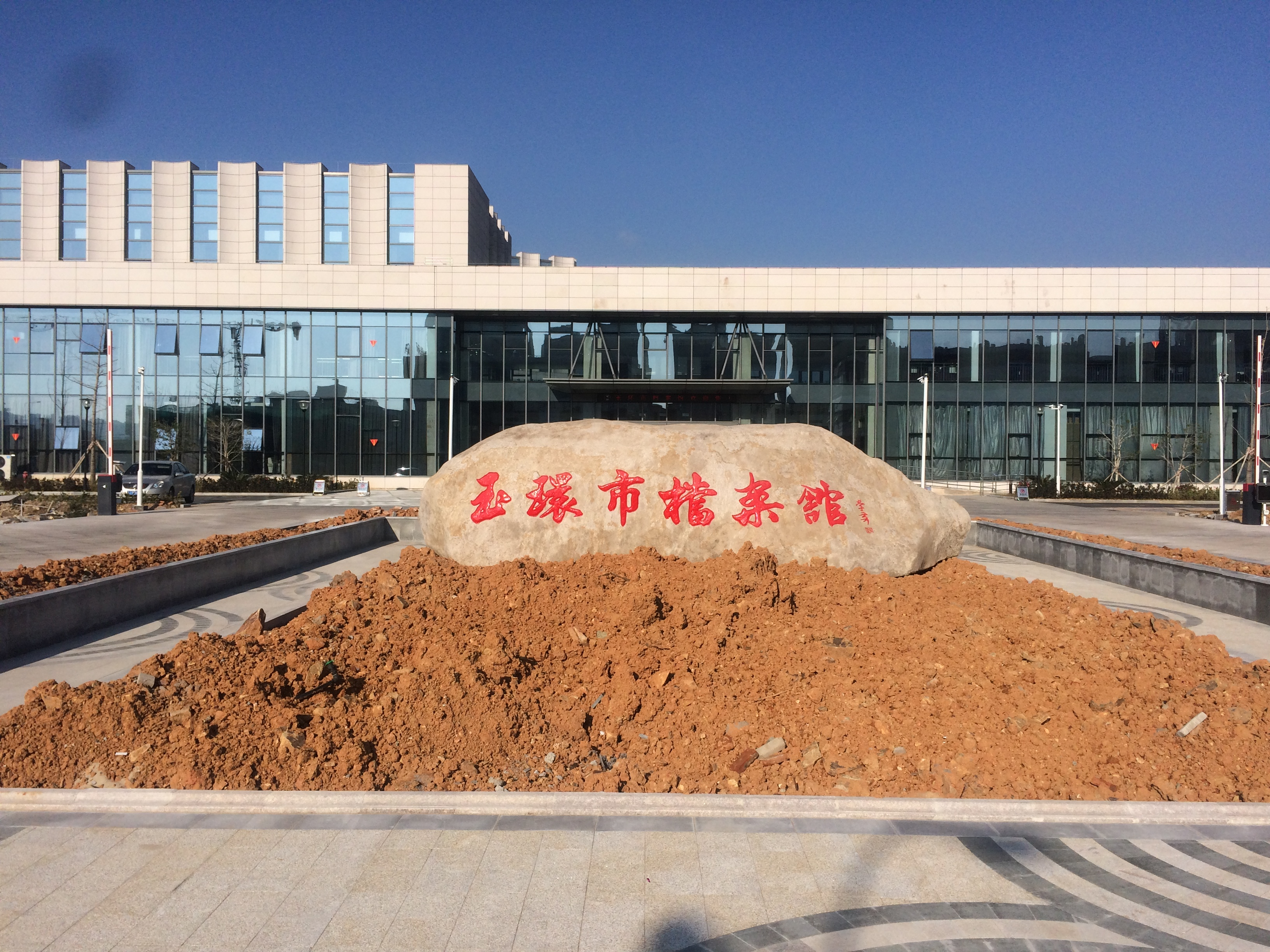
- Building of the Archives of Yuhuan
- Established: July 1980
- Location: China, Zhejiang Province, Taizhou, Yuhuan
- Type: Archive
- Visitors: More than 2800 visits (2017)
- Director: Zhong Guangwei (钟光伟)
- Website: daj.yuhuan.gov.cn xxgk.yuhuan.gov.cn/yh024/index_zx.htm

The Archives of Yuhuan (Chinese: 玉环市档案馆, predecessor of the Bureau of Archives of Yuhuan, formerly known as County Archives of Yuhuan) is a municipal archive located in Yuhuan, city of Taizhou, in Zhejiang Province, China, established in July 1980.

The current building was built in October 1984, with an area of 699 square meters, of which 422 square meters is the area of the library. Until June 2018, the collection of archives had 155 full files, more than 70,000 volumes, and 12,933 books in the collection. The new building of the archive is located on the side of Xuanmen Bay 3rd Bridge, Shugang Avenue, Yuhuan Economic Development Zone; the old building has been closed and is located in Yucheng Subdistrict. The museum has achieved the honor of "Model County for Archives in the Construction of National Socialism's New Rural Areas" for Yuhuan, and it is the seventh in Zhejiang Province and the first in Taizhou City to be designed as, "First Grade Standard Archive in Zhejiang Province".

== History ==
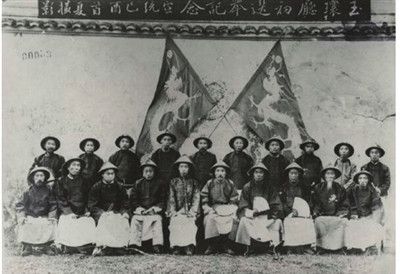
A commemorative photo of the Yuhuan Hall's first election in the first year of the Xuantong era of the Qing Dynasty (1909), and at the same time, the oldest existing photo in the Archives of Yuhuan.

During the period of the Republic of China on the mainland, Yuhuan County government had not yet established an archive, and archive management was carried out by the General Affairs Department and the Secretariat Office, with dedicated clerks responsible for document management. After the founding of the People's Republic of China, the Yuhuan County Committee and County People's Government had a part-time archivist in the Secretariat Office. At that time, in order to meet the needs of coastal struggles, document and archive management were simplified and streamlined. In 1953, an archive room was established. Subsequently, documents and archives from various departments were gradually transferred there. In April 1962, it was restructured into the County Archives of Yuhuan. During the Cultural Revolution, all archives were transferred to Huangyan District, with some of them being damaged by termites. After the Cultural Revolution ended, work resumed as normal. In July 1980, County Archives of Yuhuan was formally established, and at the time of its establishment, it had 6,025 volumes of archival materials. In October 1984, the archive building was completed. By the end of 1985, most of the archives from before 1980 had been received, and work had also begun on creating audio-visual archives. In July 1988, County Archives of Yuhuan opened 778 volumes of historical archives from before the founding of the People's Republic of China and 278 volumes of historical archives from after its founding.

From the 1930s to the 1990s, County Archives of Yuhuan completed the work related to the consolidation of townships. In December 1992, it was rated as a 'Zhejiang Province Level 3 Archives'. In December 1995, County Archives of Yuhuan underwent an upgrading and evaluation by a joint evaluation team from the Zhejiang Provincial Archives Bureau. It ranked fourth in the overall assessment score in the province and became the tenth 'Zhejiang Province Level 2 Comprehensive Archives' in Zhejiang Province and the first in Taizhou City. In the same year, it was awarded the title of 'Advanced Collective of Zhejiang Province's Archive System' for the fifteenth consecutive time. In March 1996, the Archive was recognized as an 'Advanced Unit in Zhejiang Province's Archives Work during the Eighth Five-Year Plan.' It was estimated that by 1996, the archives had created direct and indirect economic benefits of more than 5 million yuan for the community. On December 16, 1997, it was upgraded to a 'Zhejiang Province Level 1 Standard Archives,' becoming the seventh in the province and the first in Taizhou City to achieve this status. In June of the same year, the County Archives Bureau of Yuhuan was designated as a department at the division chief level, under the management of the Yuhuan County Committee of the Chinese Communist Party (CCP). Subsequently, the Archives became an 'Advanced Unit in Promoting 'Safe Zhejiang' Construction in Zhejiang Province's Archive System' and an 'Advanced Unit in Rural Archive Information Sharing Work in Zhejiang Province'.

In June 2003, in order to scientifically utilize archives, Yuhuan issued the 'Management Measures for Major Event Archives in Yuhuan County,' which stipulated that the archives of major events should be transferred to the county archives. In December 2005, the Yuhuan County Committee of the CCP and the County Government decided to designate County Archives of Yuhuan as a place for the public disclosure of government information, to be used for publicizing government information. In 2011, the County Archives of Yuhuan new building project was included in the 'Twelfth Five-Year Plan' for the national economy and social development of Yuhuan. In 2013, based on becoming a 'Zhejiang Province Model County for Archives Work in the Construction of Socialism's New Rural Areas', Yuhuan decided to establish itself as a 'National Model County for Archives Work in the Construction of Socialism's New Rural Areas'. The Archives were required to complete the transfer of over 10,000 volumes of archives. After concerted efforts, on December 26, the county successfully passed the inspection by the 'National Demonstration County for Archives Work in the Construction of Socialism's New Rural Areas National Acceptance Team' and received this honor. As a result, County Archives of Yuhuan achieved its first national-level recognition.

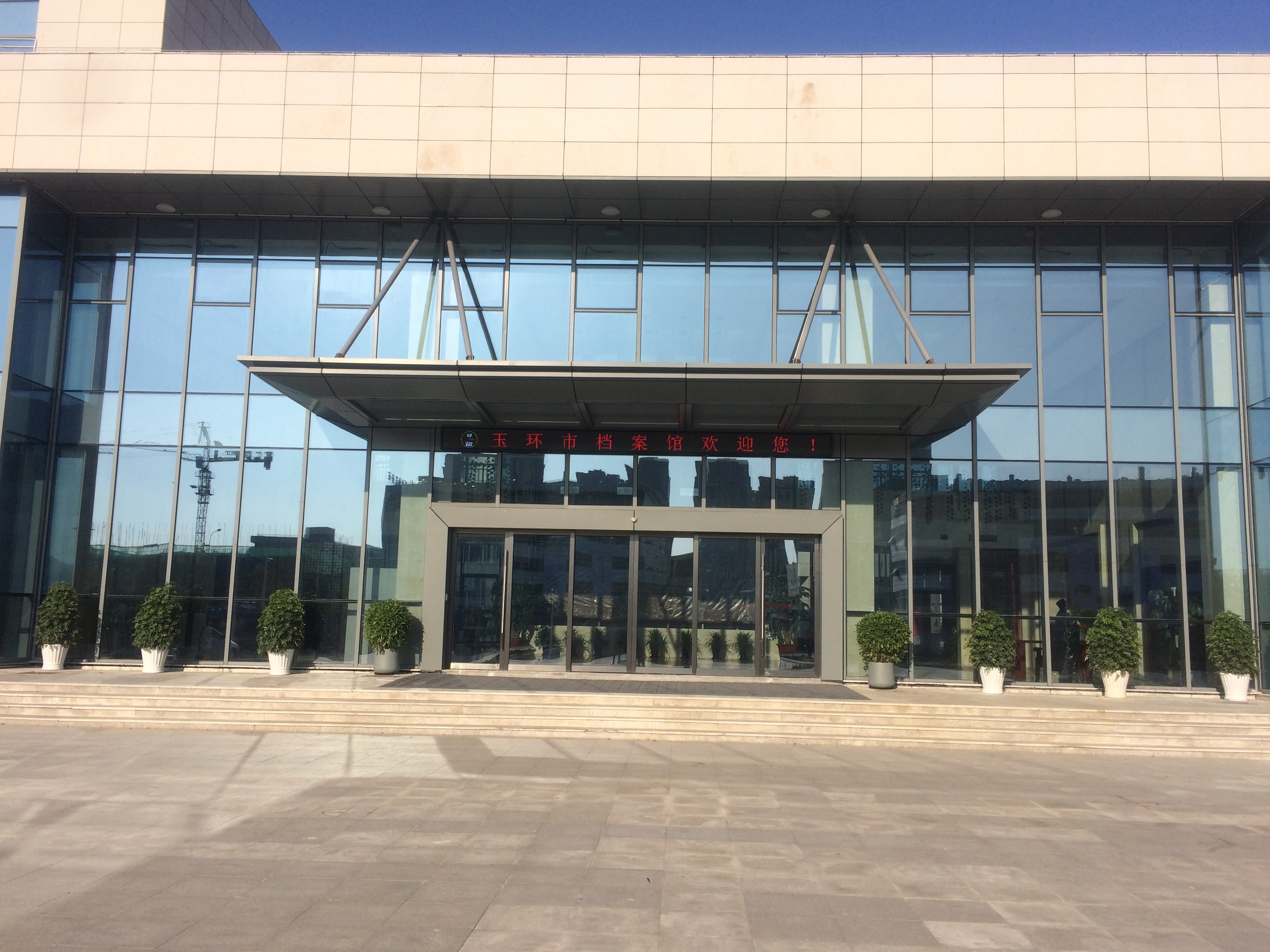
Archives of Yuhuan new building entrance.

In April 2017, following the change from a county to a city, it was renamed as City Archives of Yuhuan, and immediately started the archival consolidation work corresponding to this administrative change. On the morning of September 11, 2017, the ceremony for the new building of City Archives of Yuhuan was held, marking the beginning of this project. After approximately two years of construction, the new building was officially accepted in August 2019. The relocation process began on November 5, 2019, and was completed on January 5, 2020. Three days later, during the Fourth Plenary Session of the Fifteenth Congress of the CCP Yuhuan Municipal Committee, the commissioning of the new archive building was included in the working report of the Yuhuan Municipal Committee of the CCP.

== Building ==
The old building was constructed in October 1984, with a floor area of 699 square meters, including a storage area of 422 square meters. Subsequently, equipment such as dehumidifiers, temperature control devices, vacuum cleaners, photocopiers, cameras, and recording machines were added, meeting the basic requirements for archive preservation, including protection against pests, rodents, fire, light, theft, moisture, and dust. The old building is located at No. 6 Dongcheng Road, in a small courtyard behind the Yuhuan City People's Government building.

As history progressed, the old archive building became insufficient in capacity, leading to the inability to accommodate over 30,000 volumes of archives from various departments over the past decade. It could no longer meet the archival storage and management needs of Yuhuan. As a result, Yuhuan decided to establish a new archive building. The originally planned location for the new building was in Yuhuan New City (specifically, Xuanmen III of Yuhuan Economic Development Zone), but it was later adjusted to Xuanmen II Cultural Square (located on Shugang Avenue, next to Xuanmen Bay 3rd Bridge. The construction of the new building started on September 11, 2017, and it was one of the key construction projects in Yuhuan city. The new building was designed according to national standards and was constructed in two phases, with a total land area of 12,000 square meters. Phase one had a floor area of 7,978.8 square meters, which is 11.4 times larger than the old building, with a total investment of more than 86.47 million yuan. The new building includes archive storage rooms, machine rooms, technical rooms, an electronic document registration backup center, public service rooms, and exhibition halls, among other facilities.

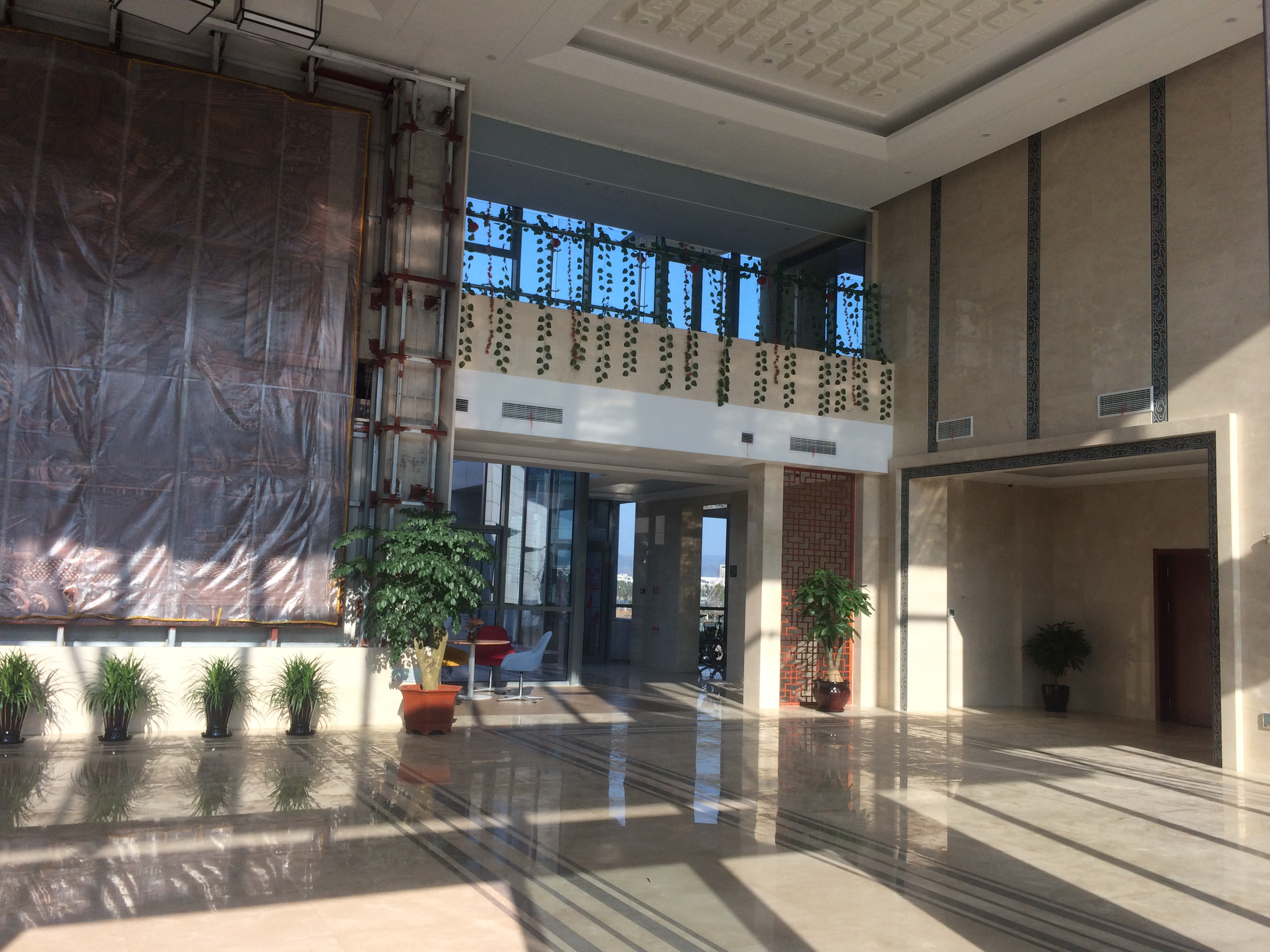
Interior of City Archives of Yuhuan new building

The exterior of the new building is in the shape of an "A," with a simple and traditional architectural style. The ceiling is decorated with clerical script inscriptions that narrate the history and introduction of the archive. Elements such as folding screens and auspicious cloud ceramic tiles have been incorporated into the walls. The construction of the new building adheres to a budget-friendly approach and does not pursue a high-end grand style. (Note: The reference source text "高大上" can be translated as "high-end, stylish, and classy.") It prioritizes simplicity, practicality, economy, and aesthetics. The project has been completed, with acceptance finished in August 2019. However, before the relocation, more than 40 issues were identified for rectification and improvement. The relocation work started on November 5, 2019, and concluded on January 5, 2020, when the new building was put into use. With the move to the new building, the opportunity for further expansion of the archive collection arose, and the number of archives could increase from over 70,000 volumes to more than 100,000 volumes.

== Archive collection and management ==
The current director of City Archives of Yuhuan is Zhong Guangwei. From 2016 to 2017, County Archives of Yuhuan received over 2,800 archive users on average each year, with over 5,000 volumes of archives utilized. In 2018, they provided consultation services to 1,676 people from various sectors, with 2,866 volumes of archives utilized. As of 1988, the archive collection comprised 99 fonds with a total of 11,300 volumes, including 944 volumes of specialized archives and 11 fonds from the Republican era consisting of 900 volumes. The archive library held 603 different titles with a total of 4,488 volumes, and additional archive materials were compiled, totaling 115,800 characters. By June 2018, the archive collection had grown to 155 fonds, with 78,585 volumes of physical archives, 3.9 million pages of digitized archives, 82 boxes of audio-visual archives, 3,511 photographs, and 12,933 volumes of books and reference materials.

Starting from 2011, with the concept of 'Internet + Archives,' the archive initiated the promotion of digital archive work. This included planning for full-text scanning databases and various databases related to people's livelihoods (such as marriage banquets, real estate, land, and other thematic databases). The archive strengthened the collection of archives and valuable materials and compiled the comprehensive picture album 'The Pearl of the East China Sea · Impressions of Yuhuan' (in Chinese: 东海明珠·印象玉环). They also conducted archive registration and backup, established measures such as the 'Yuhuan Memory Sharing Platform' and the 'Rural Archive Information Sharing Platform'. By June 2018, 54 digital archive rooms were created. By 2017, 17 standardized comprehensive archive rooms were established within government agencies. Through the Rural Archive Information Sharing Platform, information from archives can be accessed in rural archive rooms and rural service centers in Yuhuan. This allows residents to access information without leaving their villages or homes. At the same time, Yuhuan City Archives set up phone lines and appointment-based document retrieval services, offering appointment-based and document retrieval services through multiple channels. Additionally, the archive prioritized archive security. Wang Maofa, deputy director of the Zhejiang Provincial Archives Bureau, praised the archive's online backup registration work, saying that they were 'leading the way in Taizhou City and had a forward-thinking approach'.

== Notable people ==
- Du Hongying (杜洪英, 1957) is an archivist at Archives of Yuhuan, with over thirty years of experience in archive work. She is recognized for her dedication and hard work and has developed various methods for cataloging and classifying archives, which have been promoted nationwide. She has received several honors, including the titles of "National Advanced Individual in Cadre Personnel Archive Work", "March 8th Red Banner Bearer", "National Advanced Worker," and "National Outstanding Communist Party Member". The Organization Department of the Chinese Communist Party once came to Yuhuan to learn from her.
- Zhang Jin (张瑾, 1971) serves as the head of the Archive Management and Utilization Division at Archives of Yuhuan. She has been engaged in archive management for over twenty years and has received accolades such as "Outstanding Communist Party Member of Yuhuan County" and "Advanced Worker in Archives in Taizhou City", as reported by 'Today Yuhuan' magazine.

== See also ==
- Yuhuan Library
- Taizhou Library
- Yucheng Subdistrict
