= Yuhuan Library =

Library in Yuhuan, Zhejiang, China

- 玉环市图书馆
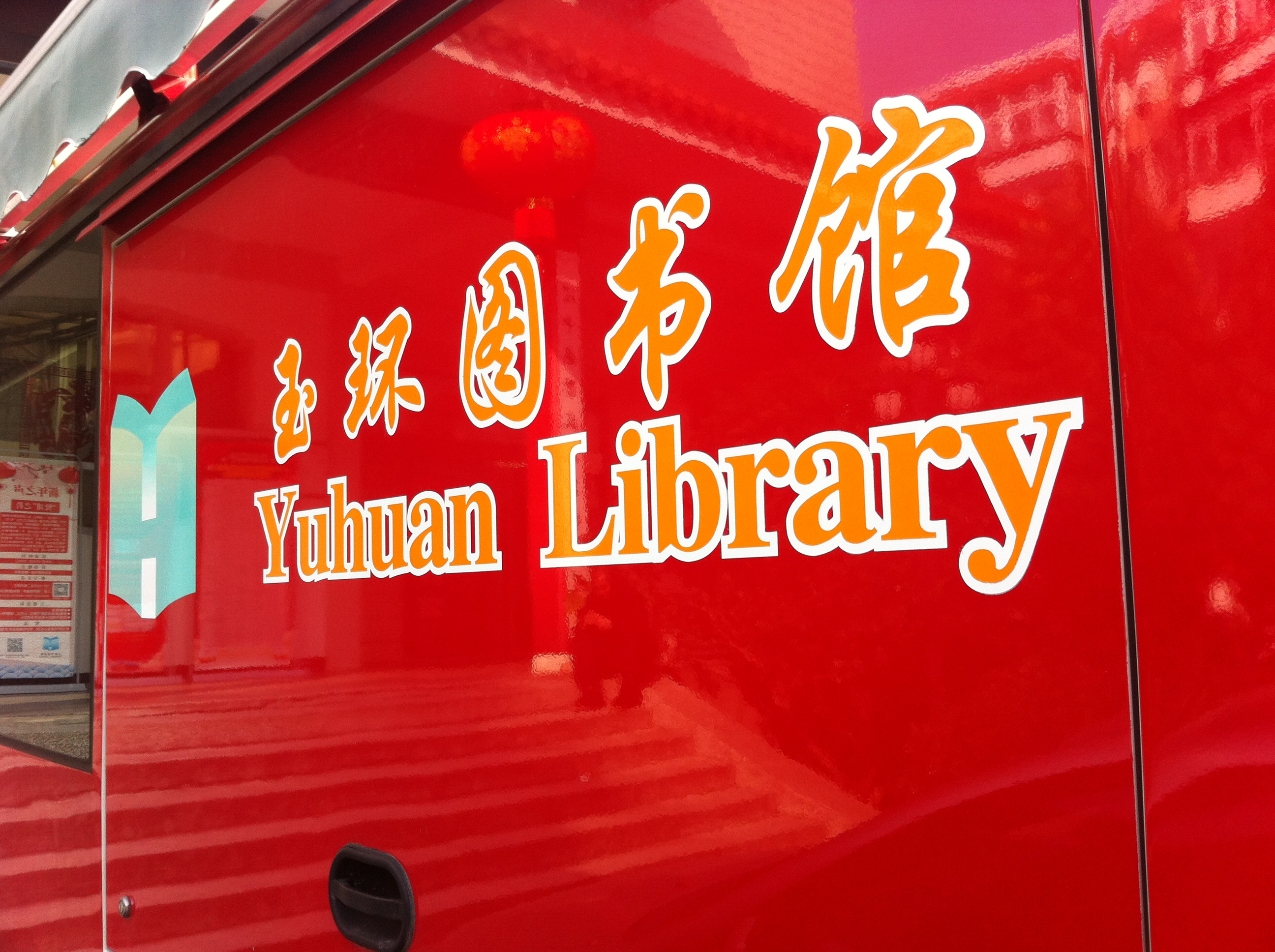

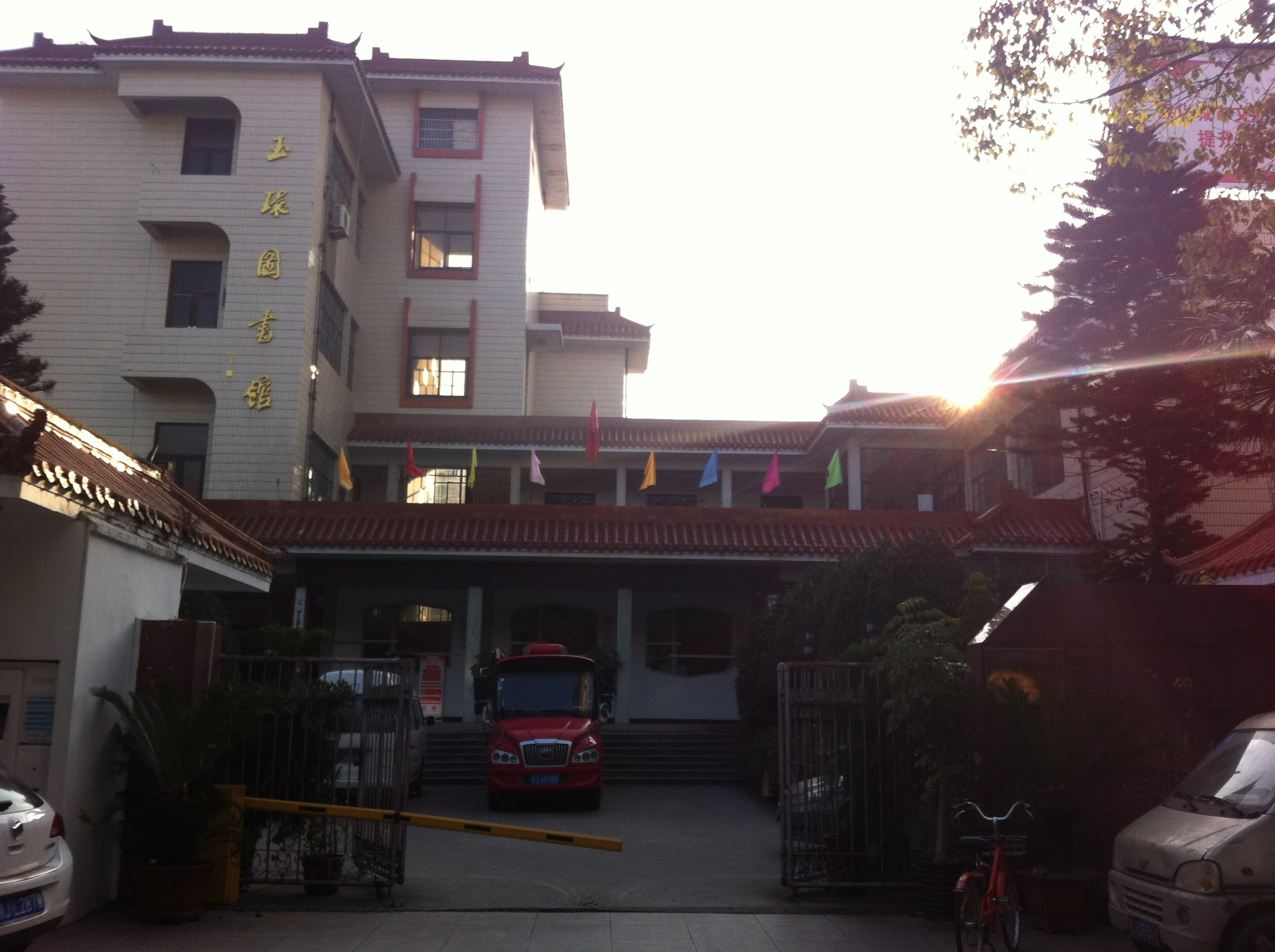
- 28°8′10.03″N 121°13′42.78″E
- Location: Guangling Road No. 69 (old building), Yucheng Subdistrict, Yuhuan. South sector of the Yuhuan Economic Development Zone (new building), Yuhuan., China
- Type: County library.
- Established: August, 1978.

Collection
- Size: Over 300,000 copies (2016).

Access and use
- Circulation: Over 500,000 (2016).

Other information
- Director: Lin Yinghe.
- Affiliation: Bureau of Culture, Radio, Film, Television, Press, and Publication of Yuhuan.
- Website: http://www.yhlib.cn

Yuhuan City Library (formerly known as Yuhuan County Library, also known as Yuhuan Library) is a county-level public library located in Yuhuan, Zhejiang Province, China, established in August 1978. The old location is at Guangling Road No. 69, Yucheng, Yuhuan, while the new library located in the South Zone of Yuhuan Economic Development Zone is under construction. As of the end of 2016, the total collection of the Yuhuan Library exceeds 300,000 volumes. Currently, Yuhuan City Library is managed by the Bureau of Culture, Radio, Film, Television, Press, and Publication of Yuhuan and is designated as a national first-grade library by the Ministry of Culture and Tourism.

== History ==
During the period of the Republic of China, the collection and reading work of Yuhuan County's books was undertaken by the Yuhuan County People's Education Hall. In August 1949, the Yuhuan County People's Cultural Center took over the books of the county's People's Education Hall and opened a 36-square-meter reading room.

In August 1978, the Yuhuan County Library was established based on this reading room, and it became independent in 1985. In March 1986, the library established an information service department to provide economic and technical information for townships, enterprises, rural professionals, key households, and rural economic cooperatives in Yuhuan.

By 1988, it had established regular data exchange relationships with more than 100 research institutions, colleges, and libraries nationwide, collecting a total of 5,780 internal materials from collaborating units. In 1993, the library moved to its current location on Guangling Road. In October 1999, it was designated as a national second-grade library by the Ministry of Culture of the People's Republic of China.

In 2017, with the conversion of Yuhuan County to a city, Yuhuan County Library was renamed Yuhuan City Library. On June 28, 2017, the Yuhuan City Library Council was officially established. On August 13, 2018, it was designated as a national first-class library by the Ministry of Culture and Tourism.

== Building ==
=== Guangling Road ===
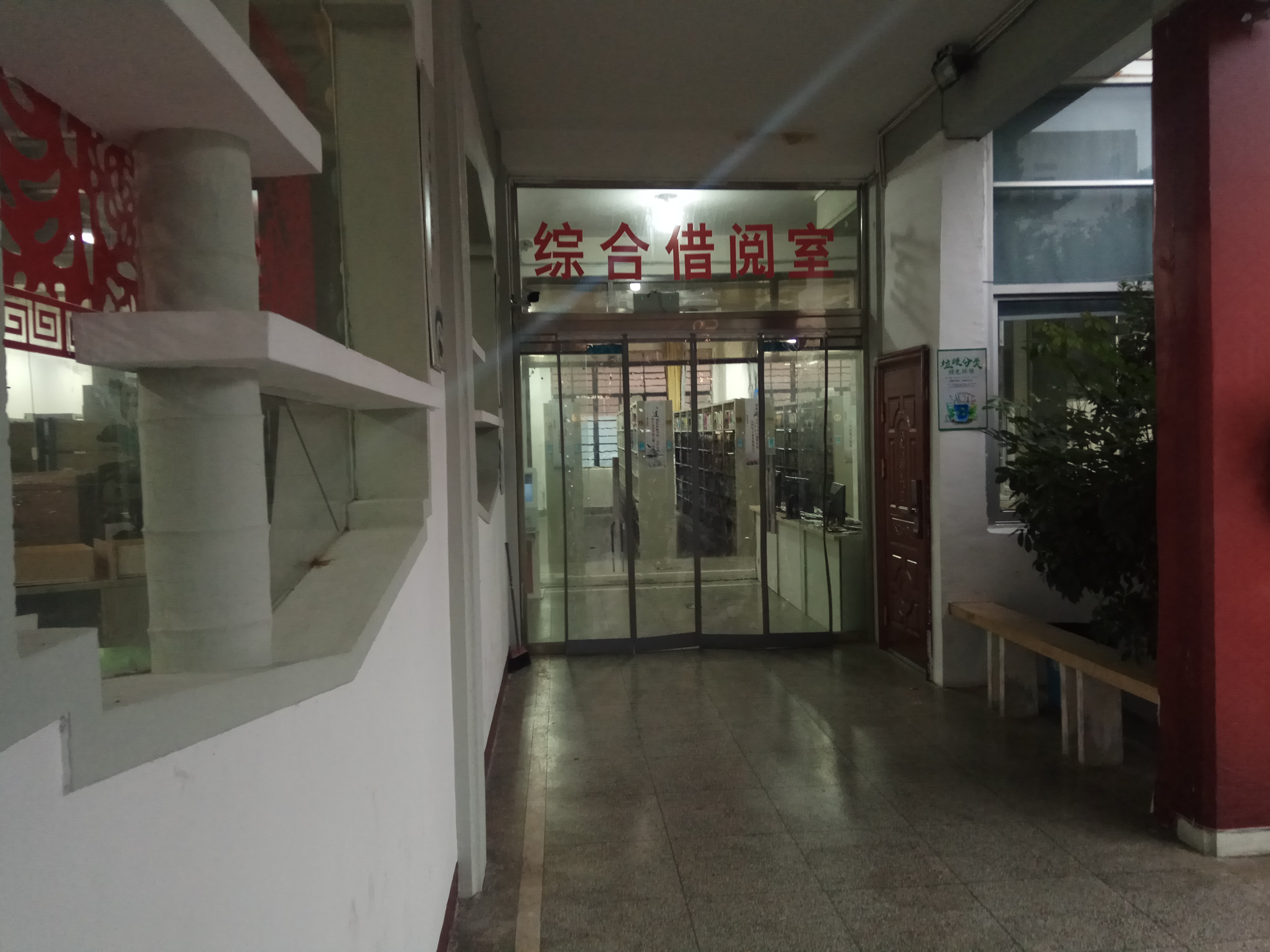
First floor of the Library: General Reading and Book Lending Room.

The current building located at No. 69 Guangling Road, Yucheng Subdistrict, was built in 1993. The library has four floors: The first floor houses the lending room (with service desk) that provides lending and reading services, an electronic reading room for network queries, and the acquisitions and cataloging department responsible for book procurement and classification.

The second floor houses a newspaper and periodical reading room where visitors can freely access publications, a government information disclosure inquiry center, and training classrooms for various training activities. It also accommodates the Information Technology Service Department responsible for technical operations, as well as the office of the library director and secretary.

The north side of the third floor is dedicated to a children's reading room, and a reference reading room containing tool books, local literature, and various precious newspapers, including the Siku Quanshu.

The fourth floor houses the local literature data department containing Yuhuan Yearbooks, local chronicles, and other local literature, as well as a room for party member activities. Additionally, on the left side of the main entrance, there is an audio-visual material lending room where various audio-visual materials can be freely accessed and borrowed for a fee. The library also features a 24-hour self-service library, an integrity culture learning base, and a reading base for people with disabilities.

Structure of the old building
Fourth floor	Department of local literature.	Room for activities of the party members.	
Third floor	Reading room for references.	Children's reading room.	
Second floor	Training classroom.	Reading room of newspapers. The center of public information about the government can be found here.	
Second floor	Department of information technology services	Office of the Director and Secretary of the Library.	
First floor	Department of Acquisitions and Cataloging	Lending Room (with service desks)	Electronic reading room
Main entrance	Lending Room for audiovisual materials		
Others	Integrity Culture Learning Base, Reading room for people with disabilities, 24-hour self-service library.		

=== New building ===
The new building of the Yuhuan Library is located in the Yuhuan Economic Development Zone (Yuhuan New Town) by the Yuhuan Lake. With a construction area of nearly 10,500 square meters, it consists of a basement and two floors above ground, featuring a frame-shear structure, divided into three venues. The total investment for this project is nearly 58 million yuan. In July 2018, the main construction work of the new library was completed.

== Collections ==
The Yuhuan Library houses over 800 categories and more than 1800 volumes of local literature related to Yuhuan, such as "Yuhuan County Annals", "Yuhuan Historical and Cultural Artifacts" and "Yuhuan Yearbook". These materials are valuable resources for researching the local history of Yuhuan. In 2002, the library initiated the "Interlibrary Loan Service" among public libraries in Zhejiang Province.

In 2016, the Yuhuan Library added over 70,000 new books to its collection. As of the end of 2016, the total collection of the library exceeded 300,000 volumes.

Collection of the library
Year	Total	Notes
1953	Over 13,000 volumes.	Additionally, 6 newspapers and 8 magazines.
1966	30,000 volumes.	Over 10,000 volumes lost during the Cultural Revolution.
1986	33,200 volumes.	Additionally, 87 newspapers and 172 magazines.
2016	More than 300,000 volumes.	

== Services ==
=== Overview ===
In 2016, the total number of book loans and returns in the entire library exceeded 260,000, with a circulation of over 500,000 books, an increase of 8.6% compared to 2015. The financial settlement for 2017 amounted to 21.8746 million yuan. Currently, the Yuhuan Library is under the administration of the Bureau of Culture, Radio, Film, Television, Press, and Publication of Yuhuan, with a total of 19 staff members.

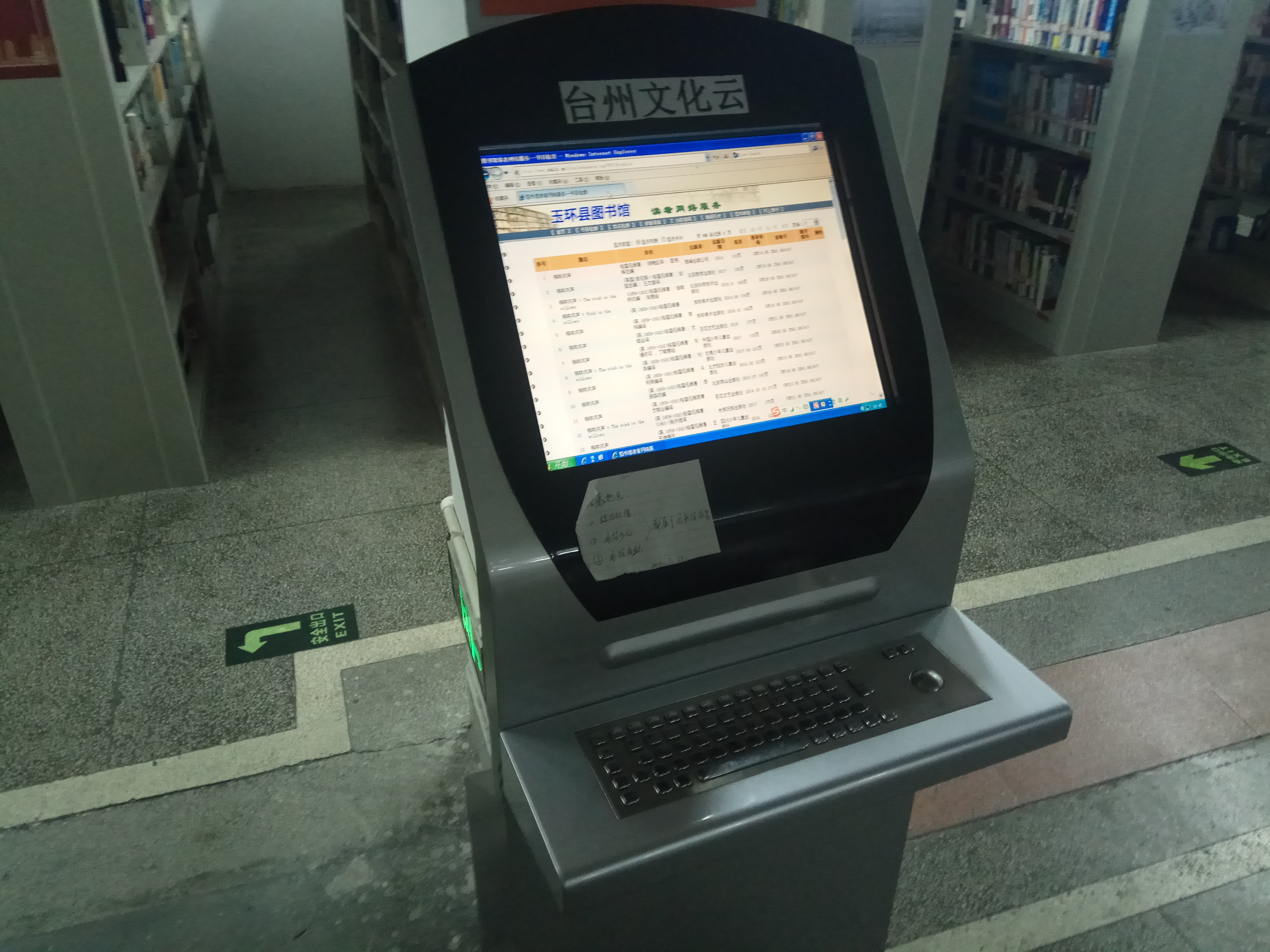
A self-service book query machine in the Yuhuan Library.

=== Digital services ===
The Yuhuan Library has launched a network reader service platform, where readers can conduct online catalog searches, book borrowing, and view borrowing history. The library has also established reader communication QQ groups and official Weibo accounts, through which staff members can release relevant information about the library and answer questions.

In November 2012, the library introduced the Bokan Humanities and Social Sciences Periodical Database Service. Starting from 2014, efforts have been made to enhance functionality, including converting the old reading room into a 3D movie screening room, purchasing a 3D printer, and acquiring 3D picture books. Currently, services such as borrowing have been automated.

=== Various activities ===
The Yuhuan Library has conducted 15 book donation activities to rural areas, distributing a total of 7,612 books. In May 2015, the Children's Activity Room was officially opened to the public, and the library, in collaboration with the Yuhuan City Women's Federation, launched the "Yueyue" parent-child public welfare class, inviting child experts to give lectures. In September 2016, the "Dancing with Spirits, Loving Green Taizhou" photography exhibition "Little Cui's Story" was exhibited on the first floor of the library, lasting until October 18, showcasing various photographic works about the blue birds.

Around the Chinese New Year in 2017, the library also organized a series of activities themed "Happy New Year, Reader Life", including parent-child interactive games, film and television cultural salons, New Year's papercutting art lectures, crossword puzzles, exhibitions, and so on. On July 15, 2018, the "Reading Sound" reading pavilion located in the Yuhuan Library was officially put into use. Covering an area of about 1 square meter, it has a shape similar to a phone booth. Upon entering the reading pavilion, one can scan the QR code to start reading.

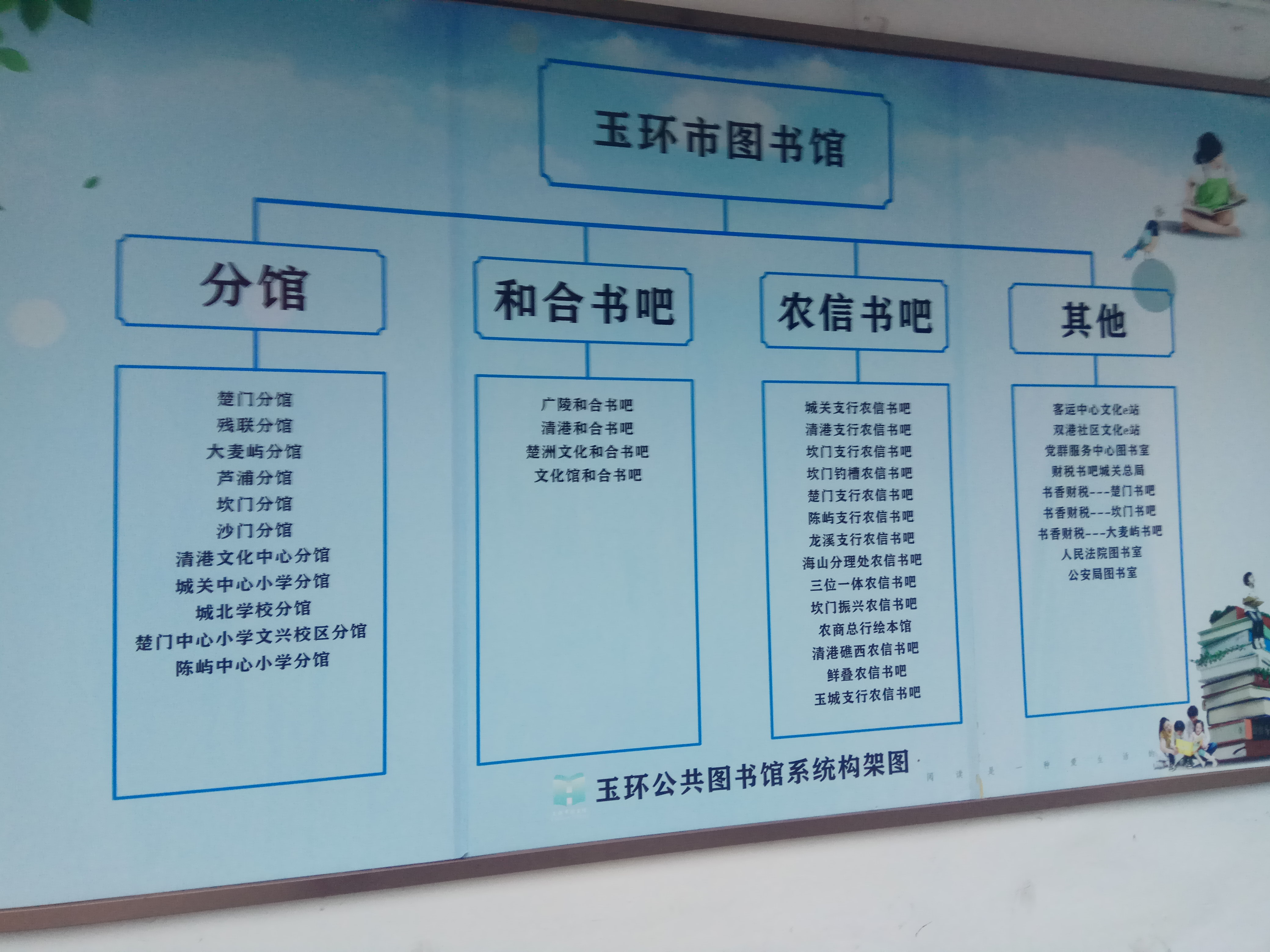
The architectural diagram of the Yuhuan Library system.

== Branches ==
On November 5, 2012, the first branch library of Yuhuan City, the Chumen Library, was officially opened to the public, jointly built by the Chumen Town Government and the Bureau of Culture, Radio, Film, Television, Press, and Publication of Chumen County (now the Bureau of Culture, Radio, Film, Television, Press, and Publication of Yuhuan). The Chumen Library is located on the second floor of the Wenling Book Academy in Chumen, with a collection of 10,000 books. It is divided into three parts: the book lending area, the 24-hour self-service book borrowing and returning area, and the children's digital browsing area, with a total area of about 300 square meters. It is managed according to unified standards with the Yuhuan Library and shares books and various digital resources.

Currently, the Yuhuan Library has established branches in Qinggang, Chumen, Shamen, Damaiyu Subdistrict, and Kanmen Subdistrict in Yuhuan. On August 31, 2017, a branch was opened at the Chengguan Central Primary School, becoming the first library-school branch in Yuhuan. On May 30, 2018, the Public Security Branch Library was officially established in the Yuhuan Public Security Bureau. As of December 2019, Yuhuan has built 8 township library branches, 9 Hehe Book Bars, and 4 school branches.

== Gallery ==
Gallery of photos of the Yuhuan Library

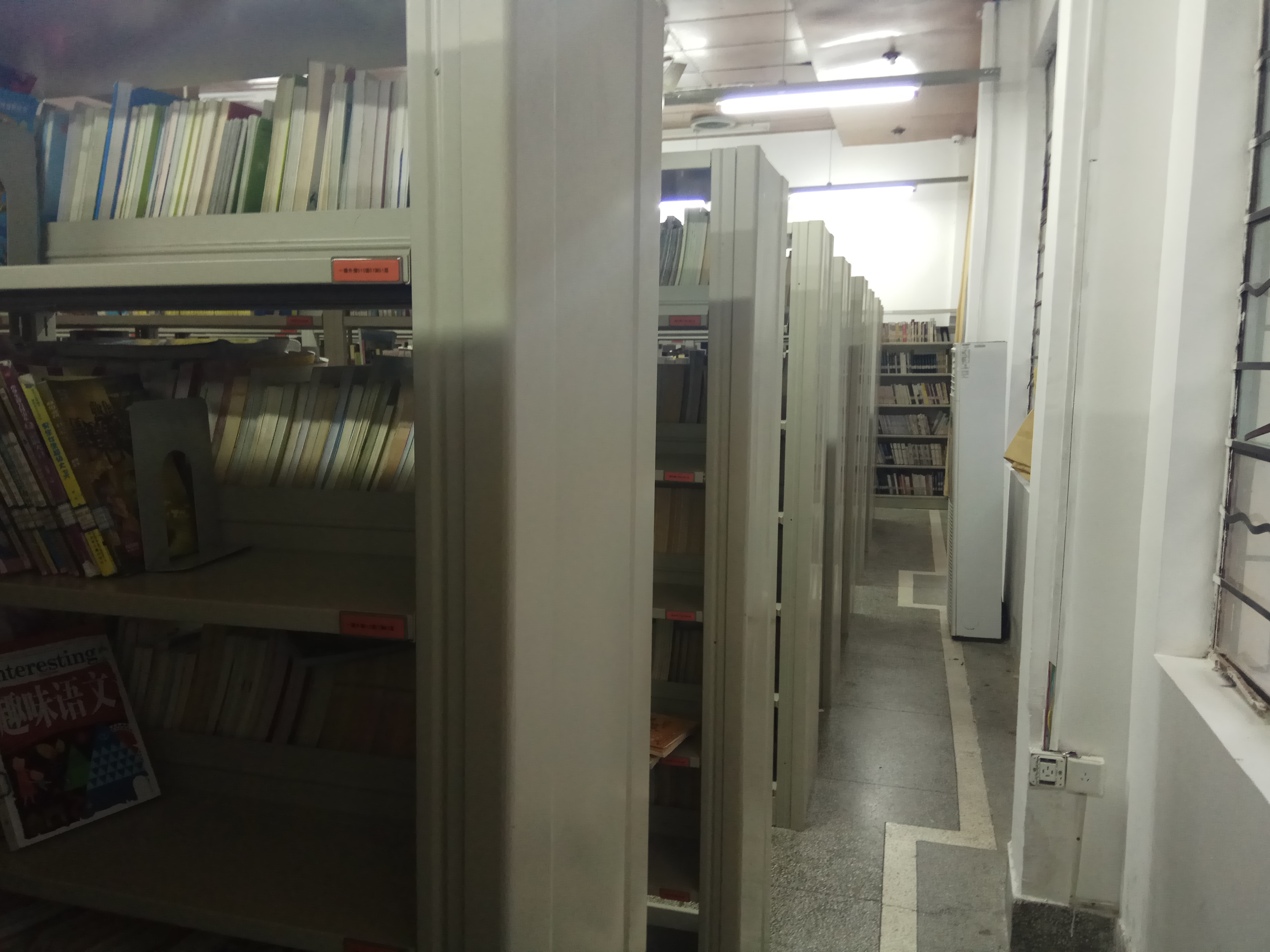
A corner of one of the reading rooms of Yuhuan Library.

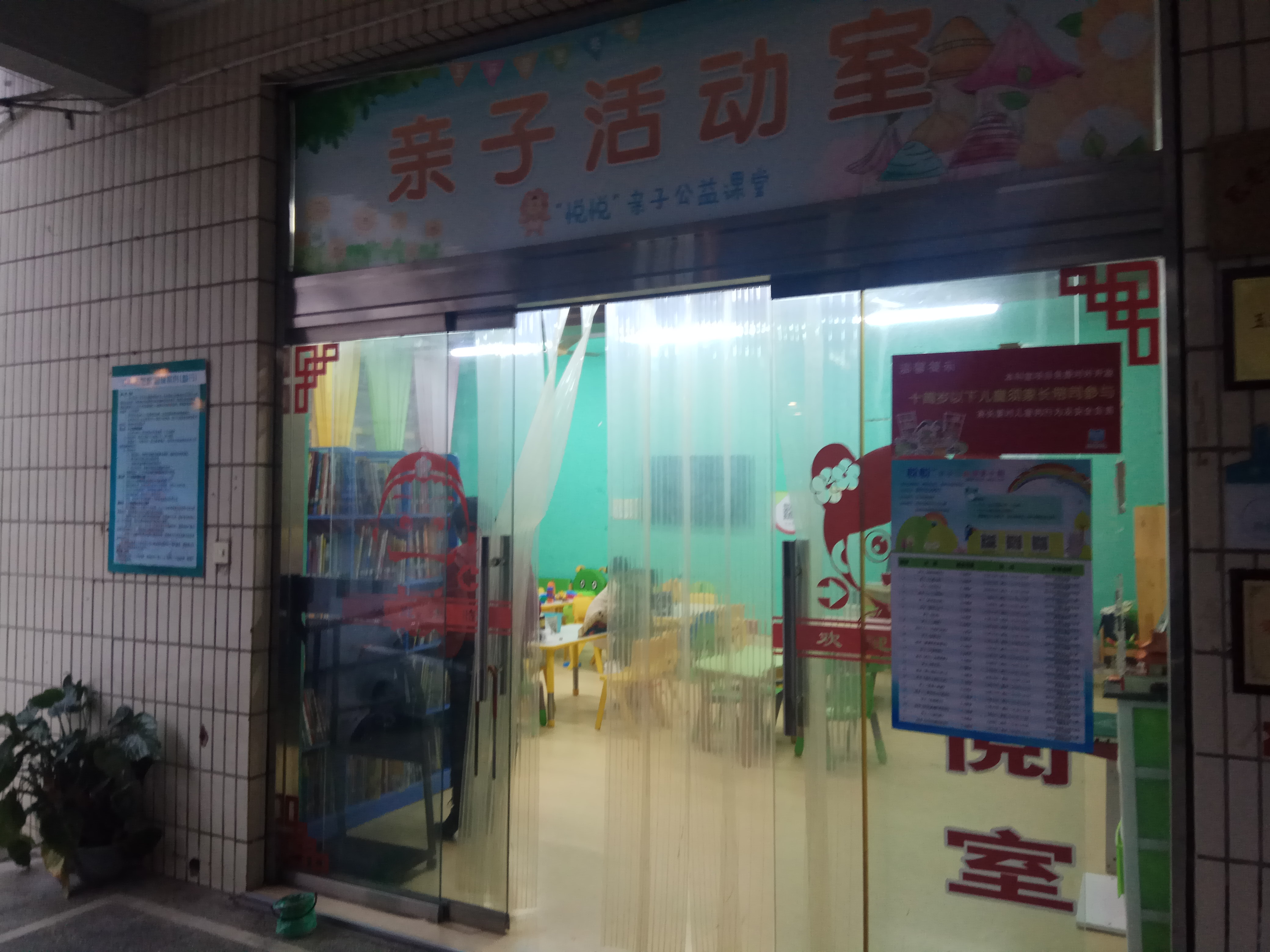
Children's activity room on the first floor of Yuhuan Library.

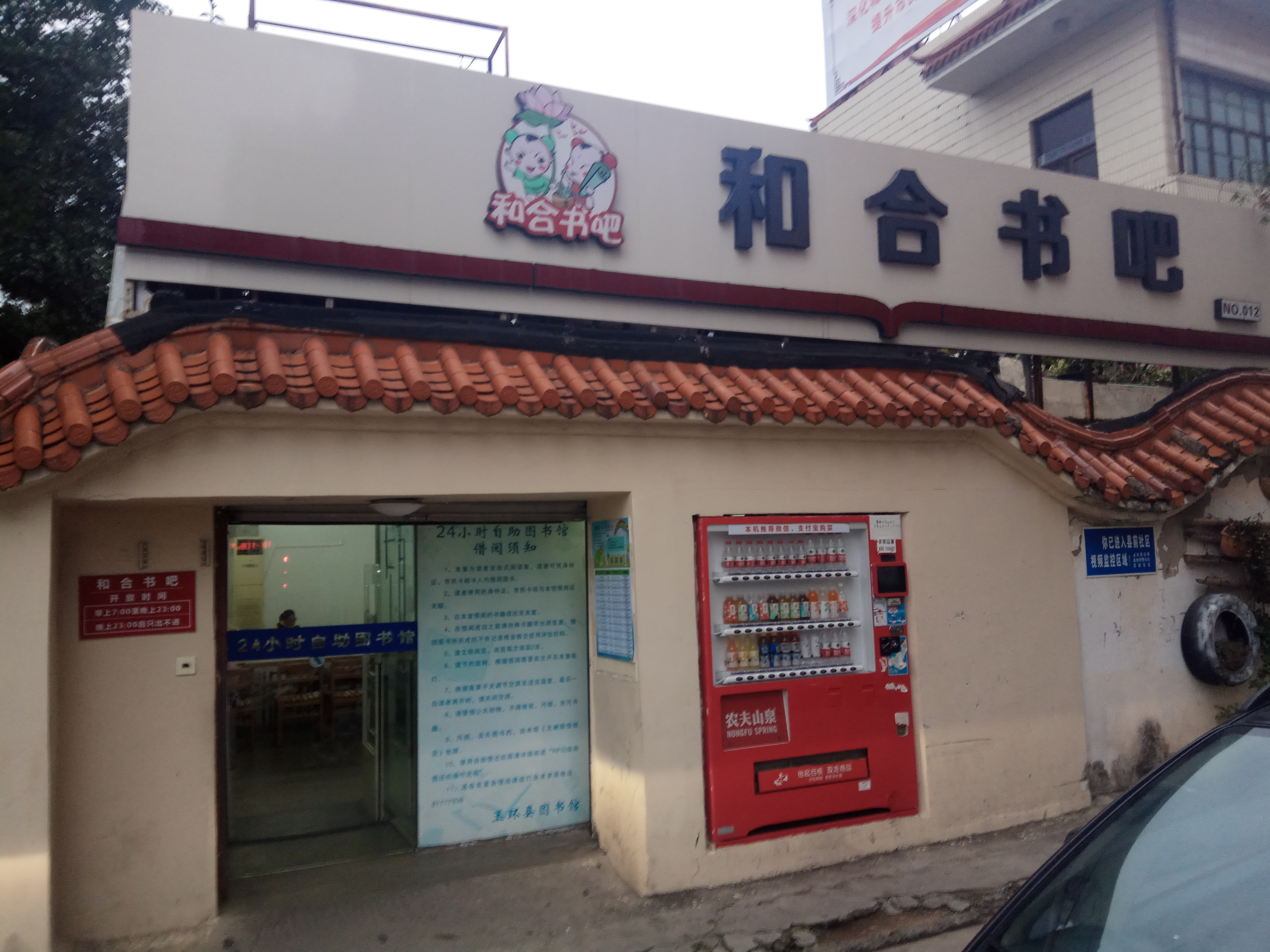
Hehe Book-Bar (24-hour self-service library), next to Yuhuan Library.

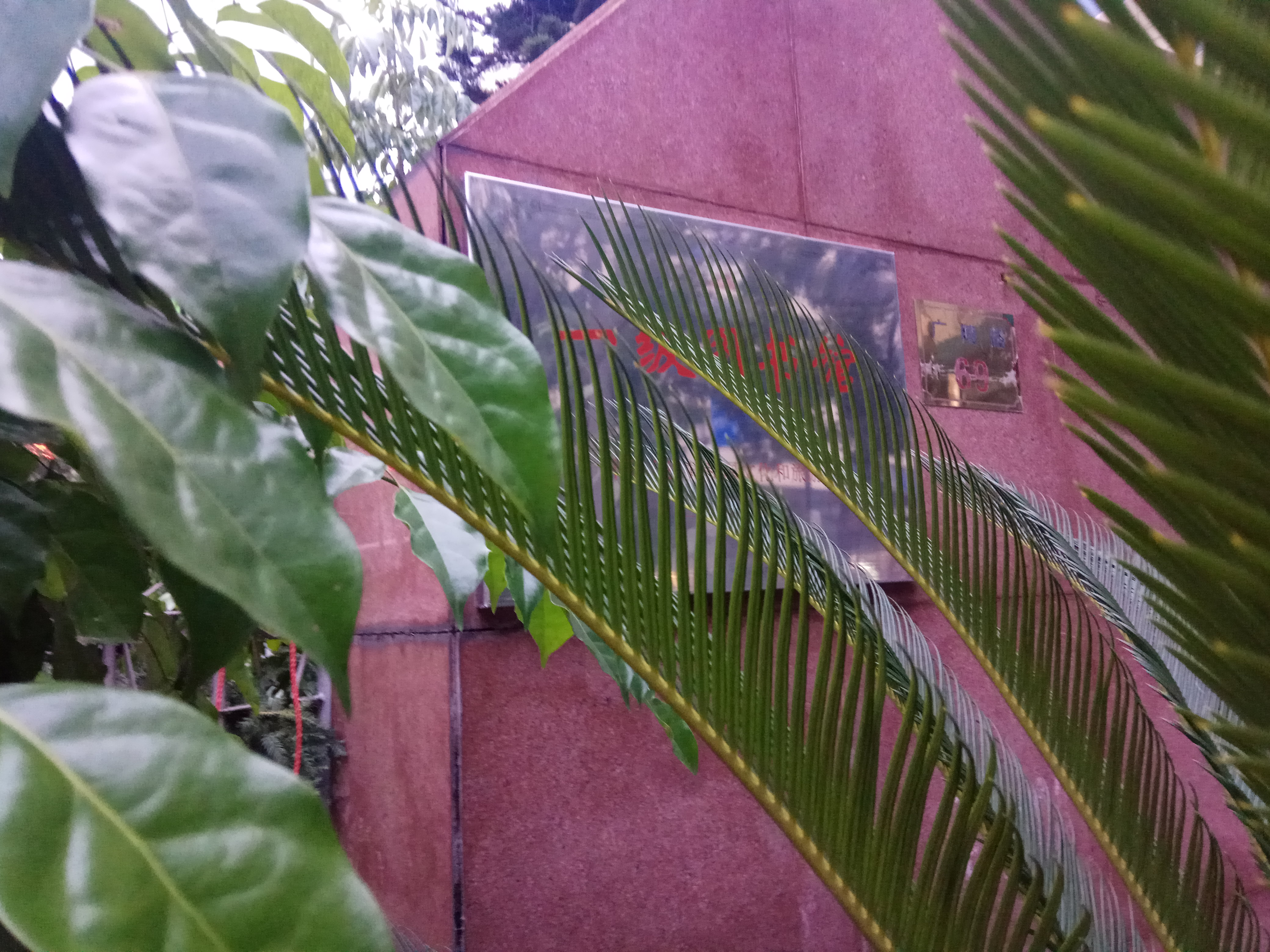
National first-grade library honorary plaque, outside of Yuhuan Library.

== See also ==
- List of libraries in China
