= Port of Damaiyu =

Port in Zhejiang Province, China

Damaiyu Port
- Click on the map for a fullscreen view
- Native name: 大麦屿港

Location
- Country: People's Republic of China
- Location: Yuhuan, Taizhou, Zhejiang, China
- Coordinates: 28°05′08″N 121°08′32″E
- UN/LOCODE: CNDMY

Details
- Operated by: Zhejiang Damaiyu Port Co., Ltd. Yuhuan Port and Shipping Branch, Taizhou Port and Shipping Administration
- Type of harbour: Seaport
- No. of piers: 3
- Cargo Scope: Liquefied goods, petroleum, ore, coal, containers, natural gas, public transport
- Average Annual Operating Days: 350 days
- Major Weather Hazards: Typhoons, monsoons

Statistics
- Annual container volume: >100,600 TEU (2017)
- Website; Zhejiang Damaiyu Port Co., Ltd. Damaiyu Port Management Office, Yuhuan Port and Shipping Branch, Taizhou Port and Shipping Administration

The Port of Damaiyu (in Chinese: 大麦屿港) is located in Damaiyu Subdistrict, Yuhuan, Taizhou, Zhejiang Province, China. Situated across the sea from Port of Wenzhou at the mouth of the Oujiang River, it is designated as a Class I port by the State Council of the People's Republic of China.

== History ==
On February 23, 2006, the navigational safety of two 10,000-ton berths at Port of Damaiyu passed expert review, marking the start of substantial construction for the port’s development.

In April 2008, the State Council approved the upgrade of Port of Damaiyu to a Class I port, making it the only national Class I port located at the county level in Zhejiang Province.

On September 16, 2011, a national inspection team, led by Baishi, Deputy Director of the General Administration of Customs (National Port Office), (Note: The National Port Management Office, abbreviated as the National Port Office, traces its origins to a temporary coordination body established under the State Council in 1993. It was dissolved in 1998 during State Council reforms, with its port planning and review duties transferred to the General Administration of Customs (State Council Document [1998] No. 7). Provincial port offices were retained but merged into various departments, typically commerce departments, while still referred to as provincial government port offices. In May 2006, the Central Institutional Organization Commission Office approved renaming the Customs Port Planning Office as the "National Port Management Office," effectively reviving it under the Customs Administration (Central Institutional Document [2006] No. 55).) and including representatives from relevant ministries and the military, conducted an inspection of Port of Damaiyu for its opening to international traffic. Following a thorough evaluation, team member Qin Mingwei, a division chief at the General Administration of Customs, announced that the port’s inspection facilities and regulatory sites met the requirements for opening to foreign traffic, passing the national Class I port verification and officially opening to the public.

On December 23, 2017, Port of Damaiyu’s container throughput exceeded 100,000 TEU for the year, the first time since the port began container operations a decade earlier.

== Transportation ==
=== Railway ===
- Damaiyu Branch Line (planned)

=== Highways ===
- S19 Yongtaiwen Expressway (Second Route) (Yuhuan Section)
- S203 Provincial Highway (Port of Damaiyu Access Road)
- S226 Provincial Highway
- G228 National Highway

== Routes ==
=== Passenger Transport ===
- ~~Port of Damaiyu — Nanyue Wharf (Yueqing, Zhejiang) (Yueqing Bay Ro-Ro Ferry Route)~~ Operator: Yuhuan Ro-Ro Ferry Co., Ltd. [Discontinued]
- Port of Damaiyu — Port of Suao (Yilan County, Taiwan) (First Cross-Strait Direct Route)
- Port of Damaiyu — Port of Keelung (Taiwan) Ferry: “COSCO Star” Operator: Xiamen Mintai Ferry Co., Ltd.
- Port of Damaiyu — Okinawa (Japan)

=== Freight ===
- Port of Damaiyu — Port of Wenzhou

== See also ==
- Taizhou, Zhejiang
- List of ports in China
