= Damaiyu Subdistrict =

Subdistrict under Yuhuan, Zhejiang, China

Damaiyu Subdistrict 大麦屿街道 (Dàmàiyǔ Jiēdào) 大麦屿街道办事处 (Damaiyu Subdistrict Office), 陈屿镇 (Chenyu Town), 珠港镇陈屿办事处 (Zhugang Town, Chenyu Office) 大麦屿经济开发区 (Damaiyu Economic Development Zone)
- Subdistrict
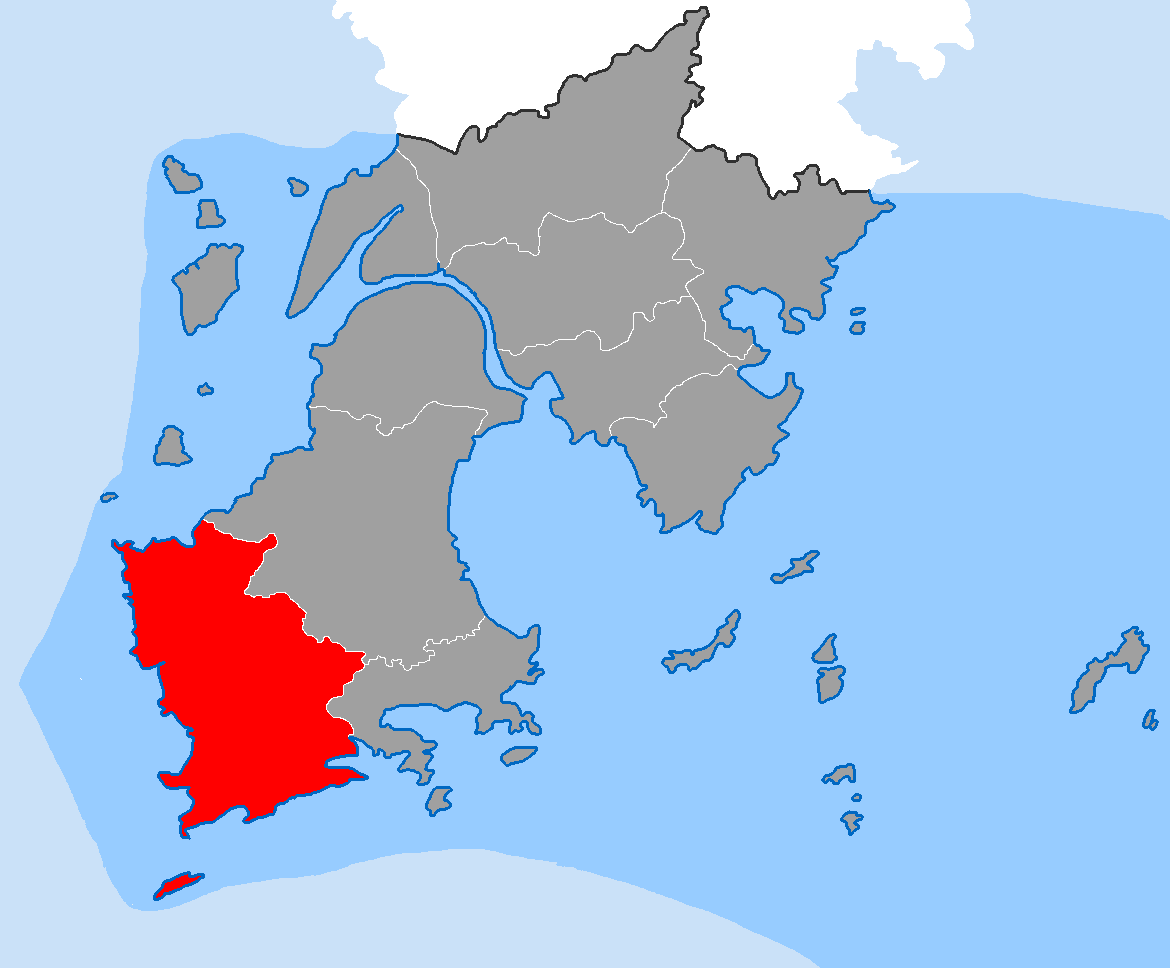
- Interactive map of Damaiyu Subdistrict
- Country: People's Republic of China
- Administrative division: Yuhuan
- Government office: 516 Xinggang West Road, Daimayu Subdistrict, Yuhuan City
- Adjacent administrative district: Yucheng Subdistrict, Kanmen Subdistrict, Yuhuan City
- Population: Approximately 97,000 (2017)
- Established: August, 2009
- Postal code: 317604
- Area code: 576
- Website: Daimayu Subdistrict, Government Office. Yuhuan City Website. http://xxgk.yuhuan.gov.cn/yhcy/

Damaiyu Subdistrict (in Chinese: 大麦屿街道) is a subdistrict office under the jurisdiction of Yuhuan City, Zhejiang Province, People's Republic of China. Its predecessor was Chenyu Town (陈屿镇). It covers a land area of 70.93 square kilometers and administers 6 communities and 48 administrative villages. According to the 2017 census, Damaiyu Subdistrict has a registered population of 56,476 people, with an additional approximate 41,000 registered non-local population. The subdistrict government office is located at No. 516 Xinggang West Road. Within its territory lies the national first-class port, the Port of Damaiyu. In 1994, entrepreneurs Su Zengfu and Su Xianze registered and established Supor, which has since become China's largest and the world's second-largest cookware production enterprise.

== History ==
Before 1949, the entire area of Chenyu Town belonged to Chenao Township (陈岙乡). Chenyu People's Commune was established in 1961, and in 1984, it was renamed Chenyu Town.

On June 19, 1992, the Damaiyu Economic Development Zone Management Committee was established. On November 6, 1993, the Damaiyu Economic Development Zone was approved by the Zhejiang Provincial Government, and Chenyu Town and the Damaiyu Economic Development Zone Management Committee shared offices.

In June 2000, Chenyu Town was renamed Chenyu Town Office of Zhugang Town, under the administration of Zhugang Town. In October 2001, Xiandie Town was merged into Chenyu Office. In December 2008, Chenyu Town Office of Zhugang Town and Damaiyu Economic Development Zone were separated. In August 2009, Zhugang Town was abolished, and Chenyu Town Office of Zhugang Town was renamed Damaiyu Subdistrict. Other changes in administrative divisions included Yucheng Subdistrict and Kanmen Subdistrict. The name "Damaiyu" comes from the government office located in Damaiyu Community.

== Economy ==
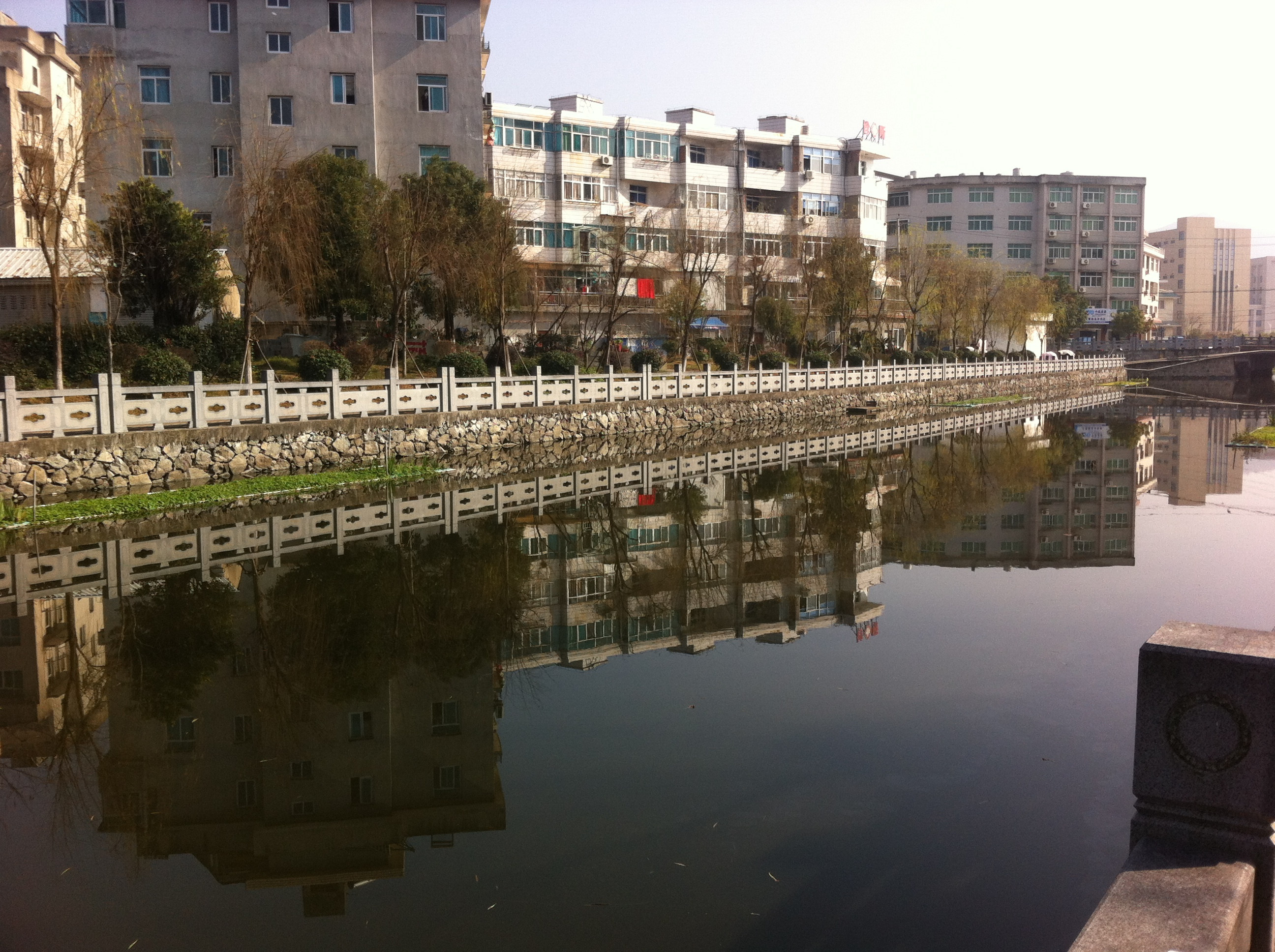
The Qinglan River in Damaiyu Subdistrict's jurisdiction.

Currently, Damaiyu has gradually formed an economy centered around cookware, industrial sewing machines, eyewear accessories, and plumbing equipment manufacturing. Supor and Zhongjie Sewing Machine Co., Ltd. are the earliest two listed companies in Yuhuan. China's first self-built million-kilowatt ultra-supercritical coal-fired unit power plant, Huaneng Yuhuan Power Plant, is also located in Damaiyu Subdistrict. In 2015, the subdistrict achieved an industrial output value of 11.929 billion yuan. Damaiyu Subdistrict is home to a national first-class port - Damaiyu Water Transport Port (Damaiyu Port). In 2008, Damaiyu Port was upgraded from a second-class port to a first-class port and officially opened for operation on September 16, 2011.

== Administrative Division ==
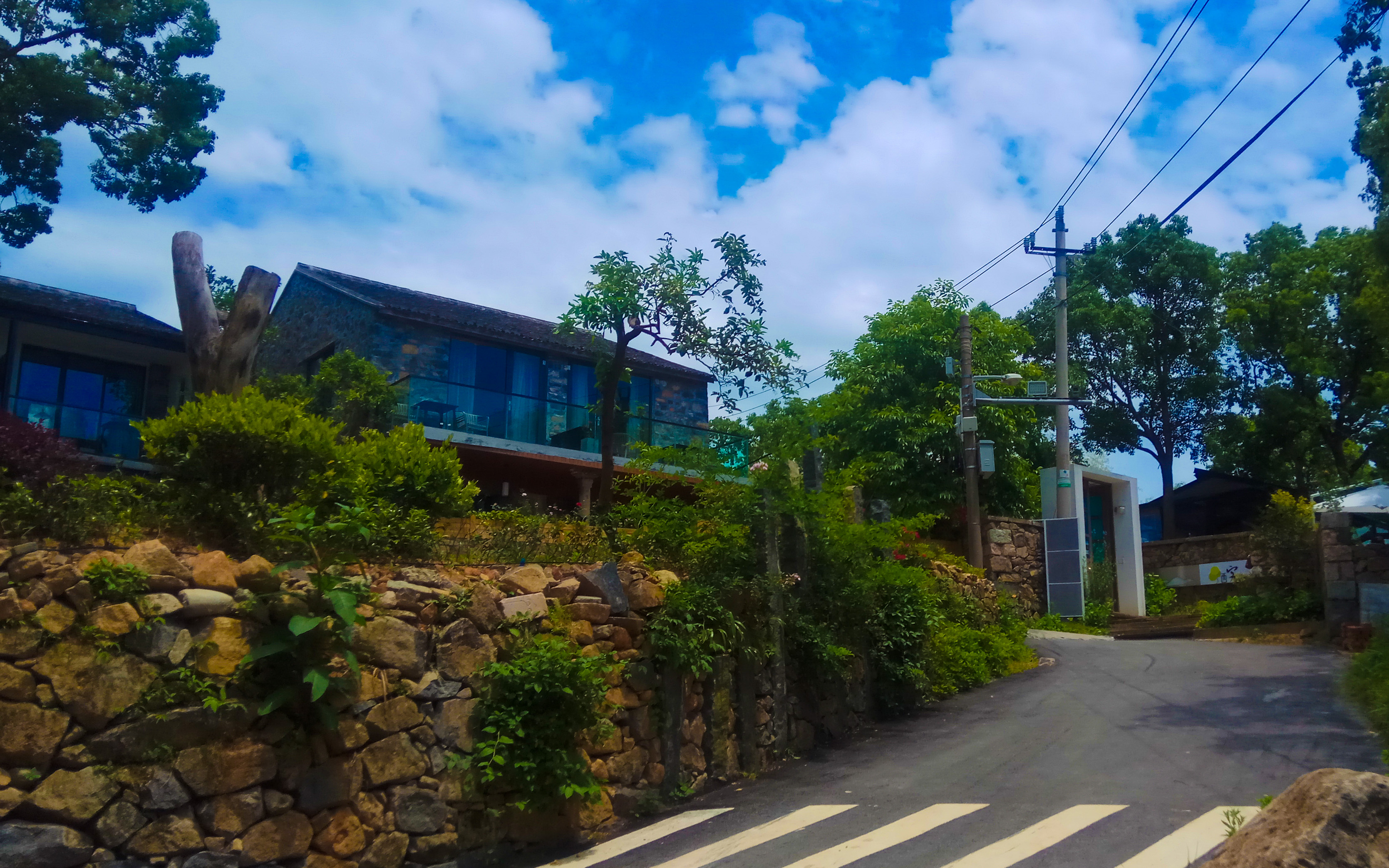
A homestay on the Shifeng Mountain of Damaiyu.

Damaiyu Subdistrict administers the following areas, comprising 7 communities and 28 administrative villages: Damaiyu Community, Tielongtou Community, Shuangfeng Community, Liuyuan Community, Longshan Community, Xiandie Community, and Qinglan Community; Xinyuan Village, Gangzaitou Village, Xintang Village, Xiaomaiyu Village, Wuyi Village, Xiaogushun Village, Shiwumu Village, Aoli Village, Gushun Village, Huanhai Village, Changshanzui Village, Lidun Village, Doumentou Village, Punan Village, Huochakou Village, Xiaqingtang Village, Liandie Village, Yangjia Village, Zengjia Village, Waiye Village, Longwan Village, Gaosheng Village, Fushan Village, Fengshan Village, Fuyuan Village, Fengcheng Village, Lianfeng Village, and Fengyang Village.

== See also ==
- Yuhuan Economic Development Zone
- Port of Damaiyu
