= Yuhuan Economic Development Zone =

Township of Yuhuan City, Province of Zhejiang, People's Republic of China

玉环经济开发区
- Yuhuan Economic Development Zone
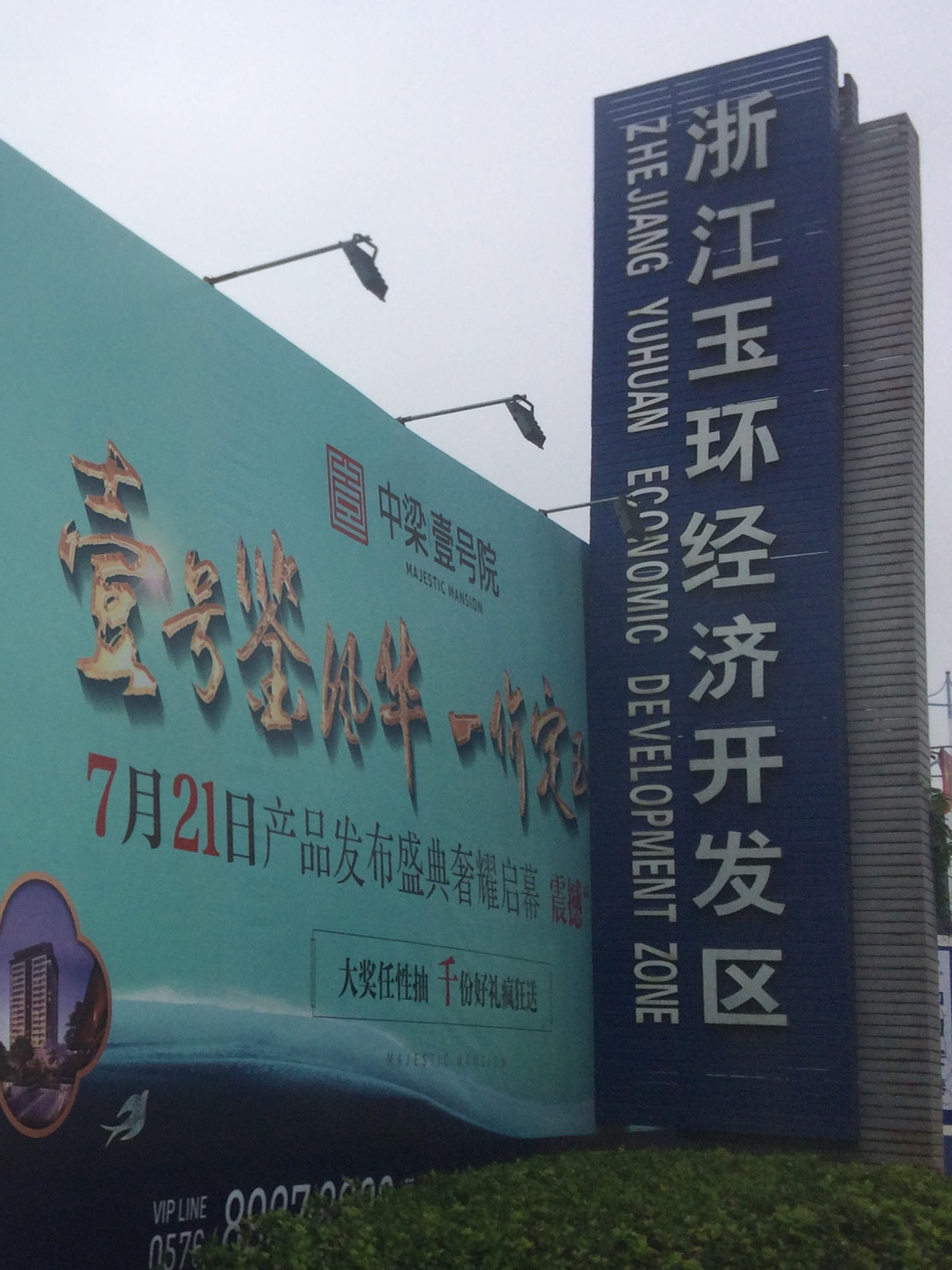
- Country: China
- Province: Zhejiang
- County: Taizhou
- City: Yuhuan
- Administrative unit code: 33 10 83 400
- Time zone: Beijing Time
- Area code: + 86

浙江玉环经济开发区
- Zhejiang Yuhuan Economic Development Zone
- County: China
- Administrative district: Zhejiang, Taizhou, Yuhuan
- Established: July of 1992
- Townships: 3
- Type of government: Administrative Committee
- Administrative institution: Yuhuan Economic Development Zone Management Committee, Zhejiang
- Website: xxgk.yuhuan.gov.cn/yh053/

Zhejiang Yuhuan Economic Development Zone (Chinese: 浙江玉环经济开发区), also known as Yuhuan New Town (玉环新城), formerly known as Zhejiang Damaiyu Economic Development Zone (浙江大麦屿经济开发区), was originally the Damaiyu Taiwan Trade Zone (大麦屿对台贸易区), established in June 1992. It is a provincial-level economic and technological development zone located in Yuhuan City, Zhejiang Province, with jurisdiction over Damaiyu Port, Xuanmen Phase II (37 square kilometers), and Xuanmen Phase III (45.3 square kilometers). Within the administrative region of Yuhuan City, the jurisdiction is akin to a township-level unit. The Yuhuan Economic Development Zone Administrative Committee is a dispatched institution of the Yuhuan Municipal People's Government.

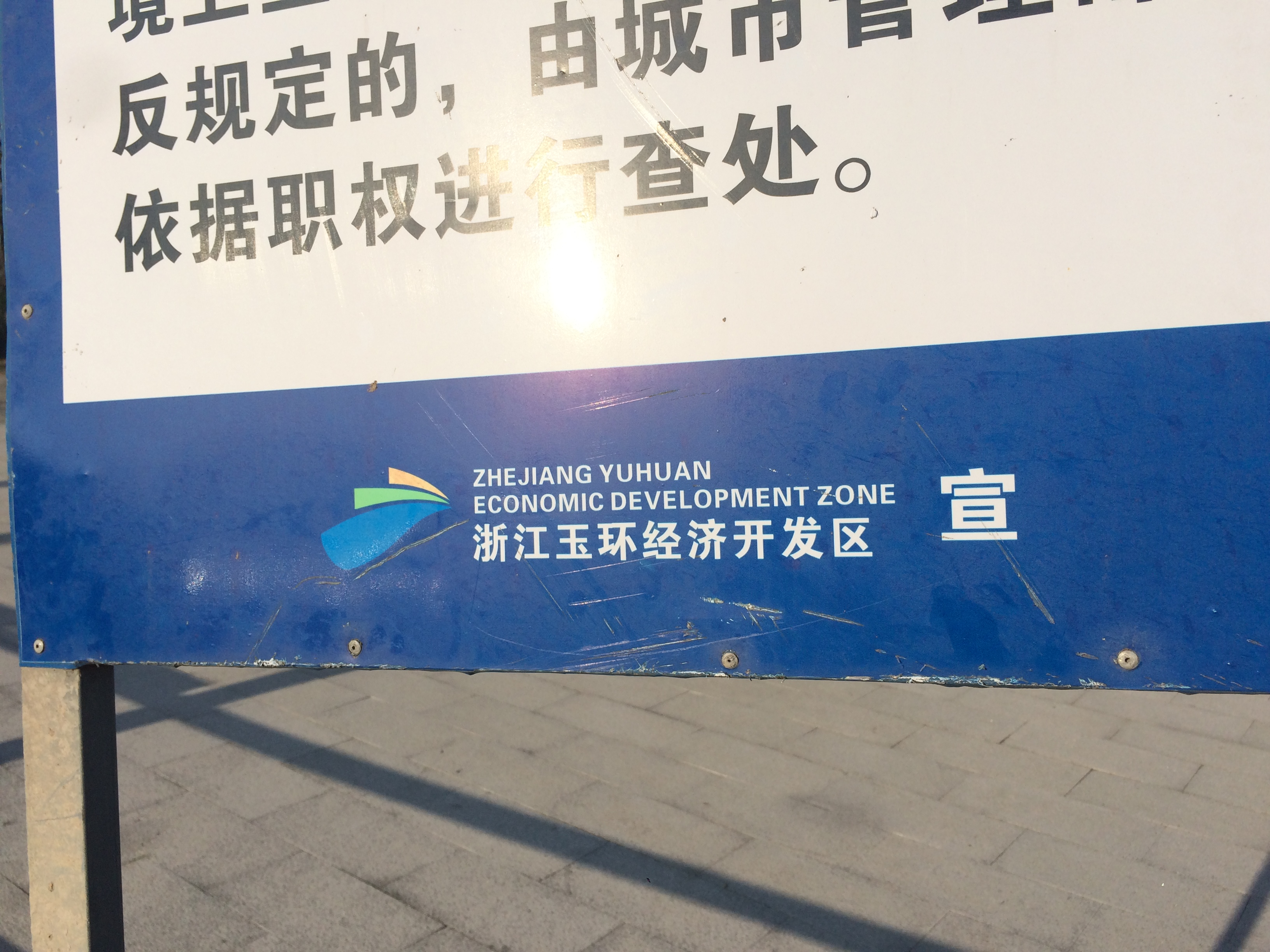
Logo of Yuhuan Economic Development Zone.

== History ==
In June 1992, the Damaiyu Taiwan Trade Zone was established.

In November 1993, with the approval of the Zhejiang Provincial People's Government, the Zhejiang Damaiyu Economic Development Zone was established and included in the sequence of provincial economic development zones.

In 2005, with the approval of the provincial government, it was renamed Zhejiang Yuhuan Economic Development Zone.

== Administrative division ==
Zhejiang Yuhuan Economic Development Zone is a provincial-level economic and technological development zone, with the level of the Administrative Committee being deputy county-level. The development zone is not a primary government and only has administrative and party committees. It does not have a People's Congress or Political Consultative Conference apparatus. Currently, the development zone is in the process of establishing village-level autonomous organizations.

Since 2019, Zhejiang Yuhuan Economic Development Zone has only jurisdiction over one community.

Community: Xincheng Community (新城社区).

== Tourist attractions ==
=== Xuanmenwan National Wetland Park ===
Xuanmenwan National Wetland Park (漩门湾国家湿地公园) is located in Phase II of Zhejiang Yuhuan Economic Development Zone, covering a total area of 31.48 square kilometers, with wetland area of 28.6 square kilometers.

On August 16, 2016, the State Forestry Administration issued the "Notice on the Acceptance Results of Pilot National Wetland Parks in 2016" (Lin Shi Fa [2016] No. 107), confirming that Xuanmenwan National Wetland Park passed the acceptance and officially became the first national wetland park in Taizhou City and the seventh in Zhejiang Province.

== Institutional responsibilities ==
The Zhejiang Yuhuan Economic Development Zone Management Committee is entrusted by the Yuhuan Municipal Government to exercise unified leadership and management over the development zone. It is a fully funded public institution responsible for the development, construction, and management of the Yuhuan Economic Development Zone.

- It implements relevant laws, regulations, rules, and provisions of the Zhejiang Province and Taizhou City governments, and formulates development plans for the development zone according to the city's economic and social development plans, organizing and implementing them after deliberation and approval.
- According to the entrusted authority, it is responsible for approving or reviewing investment projects within the development zone; managing enterprises within the development zone in accordance with the law to ensure their autonomous operation.
- According to the entrusted authority, it implements unified management of land, construction, environmental protection, finance, and state-owned assets within the development zone.
- It is responsible for introducing funds, technology, and talents into the development zone; responsible for the construction and management of infrastructure and public facilities within the development zone.
- According to the entrusted authority, it manages import and export business and foreign economic and technological cooperation within the development zone; assists in handling foreign-related affairs of the development zone.
- Together with relevant departments of the city, it jointly manages the work of branch institutions or dispatched institutions set up in the development zone.
- It carries out social management work such as social stability, comprehensive governance, family planning, and spiritual civilization construction.
- Completes other tasks assigned by the Yuhuan Municipal Party Committee and Municipal Government.

== Politics ==
=== Current government ===
- Secretary of the Yuhuan Economic Development Zone Party Committee: Sun Qun (孙群).
- Deputy Secretary of the Yuhuan Economic Development Zone Party Committee: Chen Dingguang (陈定广).
- Director of the Yuhuan Economic Development Zone Administrative Committee: Shu Huan (舒欢).
- Deputy Director of the Yuhuan Economic Development Zone Administrative Committee: Li Yang (新城社区).
