= Yucheng Subdistrict, Yuhuan =

Subdistrict in Yuhuan, Zhejiang, China

Yucheng Subdistrict, Yuhuan 玉城街道 (Yùchéng Jīedào) 城里 (Chengli), 朝珠镇 (Chaozhu), 珠城镇 (Zhucheng), 环山镇 (Huanshan) 城关镇 (Chengguan), 珠港镇城关办事处 (Zhugang town, Chengguan subdistrict).
- Subdistrict in Yuhuan
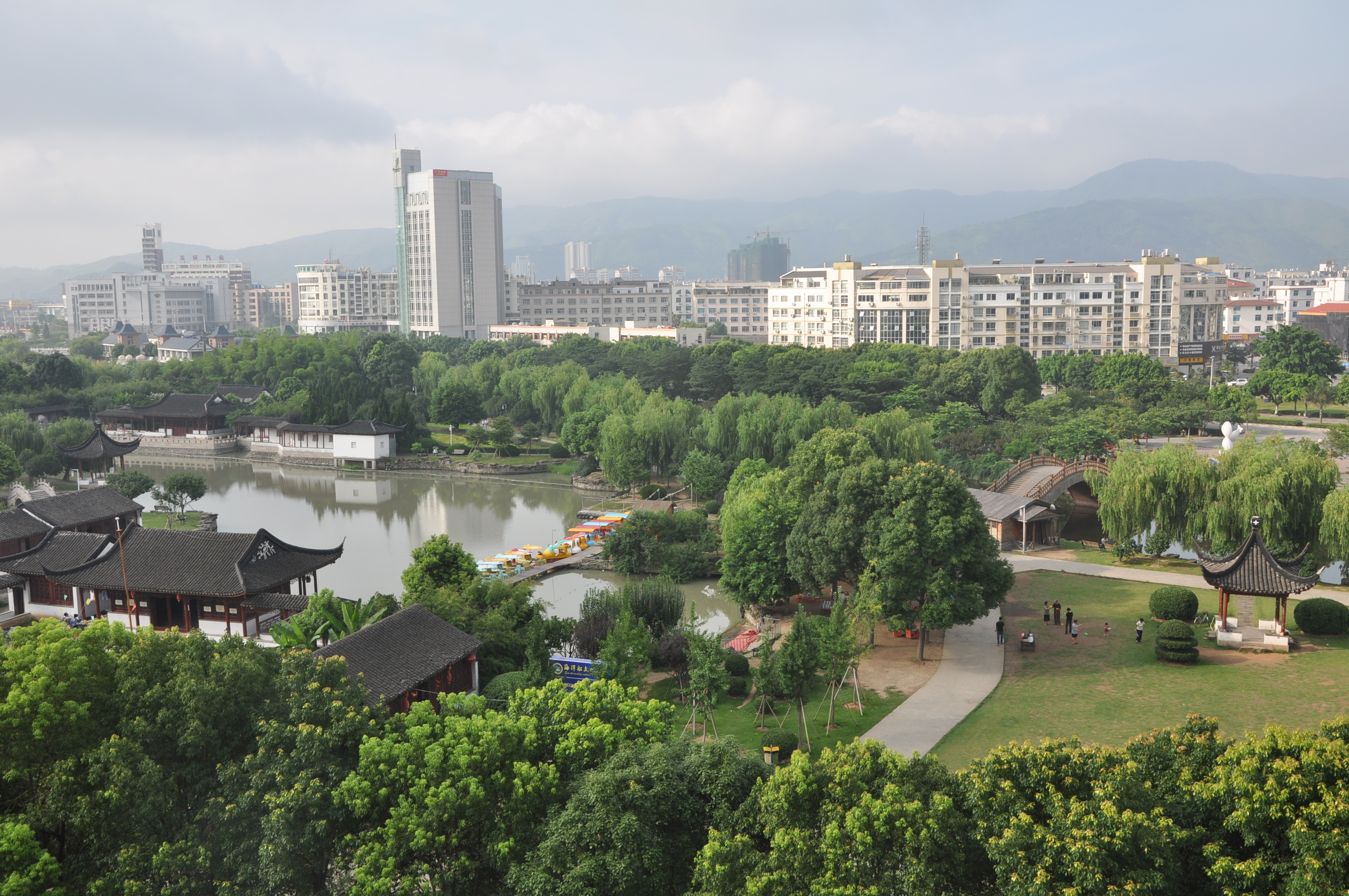
- Yuhuan Park Panorama - Yuhuan Park, covering an area of 66,000 square meters, designed in the style of Suzhou gardens, reflecting a Ming Dynasty courtyard style.
- Interactive map of Yucheng Subdistrict, Yuhuan
- Country: People's Republic of China
- Administrative division: Yuhuan
- Government office: 28 Guangling Road, Yuhuan
- Establishment of the city: 1778
- Establishment of the subdistrct: August 14, 2009

Area
  - Total: 69.92 km^{2} (27.00 sq mi)

Population
  - Total: 36,000
  - Density: 0.515/km^{2} (1.33/sq mi)
- Time zone: UTC+8
- Area code: +86 (0)576

Yucheng Subdistrict (in Chinese: 玉城街道), formerly known as Chengguan Town (城关镇), is a sub-district office under the jurisdiction of Yuhuan, Zhejiang Province, People's Republic of China. It is the location of the Yuhuan City Government and serves as the city center of Yuhuan. Yucheng Subdistrict is situated to the east of Xuanmen Bay, bordered to the south by Kanmen Subdistrict and Damaiyu Subdistrict, adjacent to Lupu Town to the north, and surrounded by Leqing Bay to the west.

== History ==
=== Historical development ===
Human activity in the area of Yucheng Subdistrict can be traced back to the Sanhetan Site 2800 years ago, located in Nanshan Village under the jurisdiction of Yucheng Subdistrict. Before the Qing Dynasty, the territory of Yucheng Subdistrict belonged to Yueqing. In the sixth year of the Qing Yongzheng era (1778), when Yuhuan Hall was established, a city was built within the area, commonly referred to as Chengli (城里). In the first year of the Republic of China (1912), it was renamed Chaozhu Town (朝珠镇) and later divided into Zhucheng Town (珠城镇) and Xiqing Town (西青镇). In the 17th year of the Republic of China (1928), it was merged into Huanshan Town (环山镇). In January 1980, it was renamed Chengguan Town (城关镇) and incorporated the three townships of Qingma (青马), Shashan (沙鳝), and Huancheng (环城). In June 2000, it was changed to Zhugang Town Chengguan Subdistrict (珠港镇城关办事处), and in 2009, it was renamed Yucheng Subdistrict (玉城街道).

=== Administrative division ===
Yucheng Subdistrict currently administers a total of 47 village-level administrative units, including 12 communities and 35 administrative villages:

==== Communities ====
Xianqian Community, Ximen Community, Yangqing Community, Xixi Community, Dongmen Community, Shijing Community, Xian Dong Community, Yutan Community, Jiefangtang Community, Nanmen Community, Shuanggang Community, and Chengnan Community.

==== Villages ====
Shangduan Village, Huancheng Village, Zhangjia Village, Yu'ao Village, Qiantangyuan Village, Houtangyuan Village, Tangli Village, Xiaoshuibu Village, Houjiao Village, Huandong Village, Huanjiao Village, Nanshan Village, Beishan Village, Xiaopuzhu Village, Waimadao Village, Xitan Village, Xiqingtang Village, Jiangyan Village, Shang'ao Village, Zhongduan Village, Baiyan Village, Chengdong Village, Litojiao Village, Sanshui Village, Santan Village, Yuxing Village, Huanfeng Village, Qingfeng Village, Xiqingling Village, Gangwan Village, Jingang Village, Chengzhong Village, Yushan Village, Beicheng Village, and Jiushan Village.

== Tourism ==
=== Sanhetan site ===
The Sanhetan Site is located in Nanshan Village under the jurisdiction of Yucheng Subdistrict, with a history dating back approximately 2800 to 2400 years. The site covers an area of about 2500 square meters, with a cultural layer thickness of around 2 meters, and artifacts scattered over an area of about 2.1 square kilometers. Discovered in 1981 by local villagers during excavation activities, the site spans a period of 1800 years, providing rich data for the study of prehistoric cultures in the southeastern coastal islands of mainland China.

=== Yuhuan park ===
Yuhuan park was completed in August 1996, covering an area of 85,000 square meters. It is the largest urban park in Yuhuan. The park is mainly divided into two parts: the scenic area and the amusement area. The scenic area is the largest green space within the city of Yuhuan.

== See also ==
- Yuhuan
- Archives of Yuhuan
