= Metro Viet News =

- Type: Weekly
- Format: Tabloid
- Owner(s): New Mainstream Press, Inc.
- Publisher: Dan Tsao
- Founded: 2009
- Headquarters: 167 Old Belmont Avenue, Bala Cynwyd, PA 19004; United States
- Website: New Mainstream Press, Inc.

The Metro Viet News is a Vietnamese language newspaper that is based in Philadelphia, Pennsylvania. Published every Friday to serve the growing Vietnamese population of the Greater Philadelphia area, it is produced by New Mainstream Press, Inc., a publishing company that caters specifically to the Asian-American communities.

The Metro Viet News is the sister publication of the Metro Chinese Weekly, and is most commonly found in Northeast and South Philly, where most of the area's Vietnamese population lives.

== History ==
Following the quick success of the Metro Chinese Weekly, that publication's 2007 founder, Dan Tsao, expanded his publishing house in order to attract Vietnamese readers, the second largest Asian demographic in Philadelphia. The Metro Viet News was originally a monthly publication, but was quickly put into weekly production due to reader response.

An emigrant from Wenling, a small coastal city in the Zhejiang province of China, Tsao was a 1999 graduate of Penn State University.
