= Metro Chinese Weekly =

- Type: Weekly
- Format: Tabloid
- Owner(s): New Mainstream Press, Inc.
- Publisher: Dan Tsao
- Founded: 2007
- Headquarters: 167 Old Belmont Avenue, Bala Cynwyd, PA 19004; United States
- Website: New Mainstream Press, Inc.

The Metro Chinese Weekly is a Chinese language newspaper that is based in Philadelphia, Pennsylvania. Published every Friday, it serves the Greater Philadelphia area, including Northern Delaware and Southern New Jersey, and is produced by New Mainstream Press, a publishing company that caters specifically to Asian-American communities.

The Metro Chinese Weekly is available via the publishing company's signature red metal boxes on multiple public sidewalks or on black wooden stands within stores in the Asian communities in Chinatown, Northeast Philadelphia, and South Philadelphia, as well in the suburbs.

== History ==
This weekly newspaper is the flagship publication of New Mainstream Press, Inc. It was founded in 2007 by Dan Tsao, an emigrant from Wenling, a small coastal city in the Zhejiang province of eastern China. In 1994, Tsao attended Penn State University; he graduated in 1999. Tsao's goal was to have a publication that was professionally formatted and well respected, unlike the lower editorial quality newspapers that were dominated with advertisement space throughout the paper.

== Growth ==
Since its inception, the Metro Chinese Weekly has grown each year. Originating with twenty-four pages at its Bala Cynwyd location, it has grown to more than eighty pages since moving to its larger location in Chinatown. With the increased business for this Chinese-oriented newspaper, the Metro Viet News was soon established.

== Sections ==
Sections within the Metro Chinese Weekly include Community News & Events, Small Businesses, Real Estate, Classifieds, Automotive, Foods & Dining, and Services such as Immigration & Law, Finance, Health. There are also smaller sections such as Chicken Soup for the Soul which entails short stories providing insight and experience.
