= Ganden Sumtseling Monastery =

Tibetan Buddhist monastery in Yunnan, China

Ganden Somtseling Monastery དགའ་ལྡན་སུམ་རྩེན་གླིང་ 松赞林寺
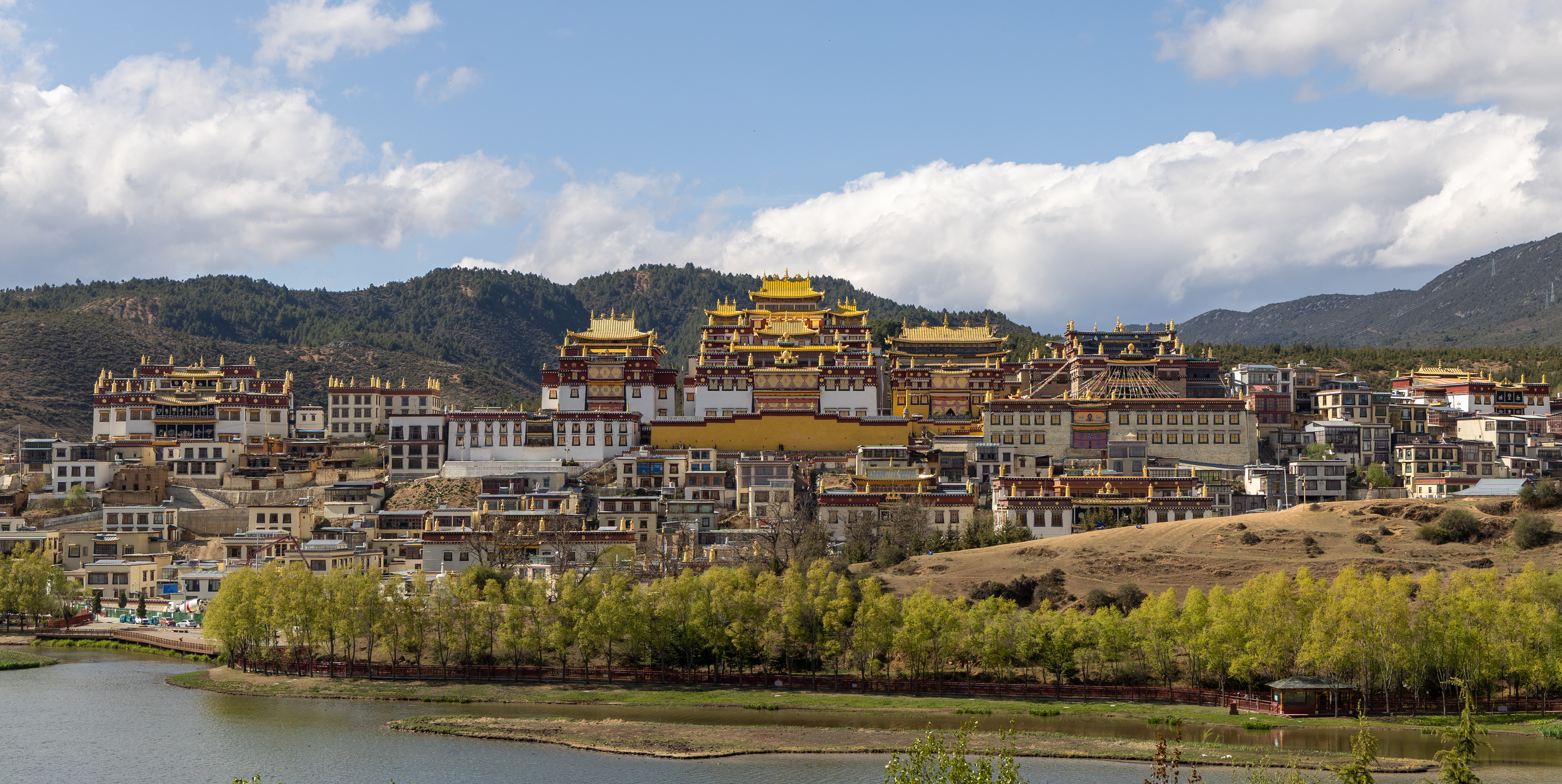
- Ganden Sumtsenling Monastery

Religion
- Affiliation: Tibetan Buddhism
- Sect: Gelug

Location
- Location: Shangri-La, Yunnan
- Country: China
- Interactive map of Ganden Somtseling Monastery དགའ་ལྡན་སུམ་རྩེན་གླིང་ 松赞林寺
- Coordinates: 27°51′48″N 99°42′15″E

Architecture
- Style: Tibetan Architecture
- Founder: The Fifth Dalai Lama in 1679
- Two lamaseries – Zhacang and Jikang and Gedong Festival in November

The Ganden Somtseling Monastery, also known as Somtseling and Guihuasi (Tibetan: དགའ་ལྡན་སུམ་རྩེན་གླིང་, Wylie: dga' ldan sum rtsen gling, THL: ganden somtseling; Chinese: 松赞林寺, pinyin: Sōngzànlín Sì), is a Tibetan Buddhist monastery situated 5 kilometres (3.1 mi) from the city of Shangri-La at elevation 3,380 metres (11,090 ft) in Diqing Tibetan Autonomous Prefecture, Yunnan. Built in 1679, the monastery is the largest Tibetan Buddhist monastery in Diqing and is sometimes referred to as the Little Potala Palace. During the 9th century, high demand for trade goods on the path to Lhasa brought Naxi administrators, Han merchants, and Bai metalsmiths into permanent settlement in what is now modern-day Diqing. This transformed the town into a linguistic and cultural buffer zone where minority groups acted as economic intermediaries between the low valleys of Yunnan and the high Tibetan plateau.

The Fifth Dalai Lama established the monastery in Zhongdian, in 1679, under the Gelukpa order of Tibetan Buddhism. It was extensively damaged during the Cultural Revolution and subsequently rebuilt in 1983. In its rebuilt structures, it currently accommodates 700 monks in 200 associated houses.

== Geography ==
The monastery is located in the heart of the Khawa Karpo mountain range. The town is located on the famous Southern Silk Road, which originated from Sichuan province, crossed Yunnan province, and headed towards modern-day Myanmar.

Well-established paths link between Shangri-la, Litang, Dali and Lhasa. Being 198 kilometres (123 mi) northwest of Lijiang, Shangri-La is well connected by air with Lhasa and Kunming from the Shangri-La Diqing Airport.

== History ==
The Ganden Somtseling monastery belongs to the Gelukpa order of Buddhism established by the Fifth Dalai Lama in 1679. It was built during the rule of Kangxi Emperor of the Qing dynasty. He fully patronized the development of this monastery. It is believed that Kangxi was associated in the reincarnation search for the Seventh Dalai Lama.

On 24 April 1936, the monastery provided full support to the Communist general He Long, who passed through this area during his campaign. However, the monastery was damaged in 1959. Since 1983, the monastery buildings have been fully restored.

== Structures ==
The Monastery built in the 17th century as the largest Buddhist monastery in Yunnan province, after a revelation by the Fifth Dalai Lama is in accordance with Tibetan traditional architectural style. It has six main structures including eight colleges. The entrance gate is at the foot of the hill and provides access to the main hall of the monastery through 146 steps.

In the main hall of the monastery, more than 1500 monks congregate to recite the Buddhist scriptures. This hall houses a plethora of scriptures written on palm leaves, a gilded statue of Shakyamuni Buddha which is 8 metres (26 ft) tall at the main altar along with paintings depicting the life of Buddha. The altar has permanent decorated by yak butter lamps.

The monastery has two major lamasery buildings – Zhacang and Jikang – apart from several smaller lamaseries. Numerous living rooms have also been built for the monks to reside. The main monastery structure has a gilded copper roof.

The road from the old town of the city, leading to the scripture chamber (Gucheng Zangjingtang), was a Red Army Memorial hall to commemorate the Long March of the 1930s. At the opposite end of this hall, across the street is the Gulshan Park (Gulshan Gongyuan), which has a monastery with a commanding view of the town and its surroundings.

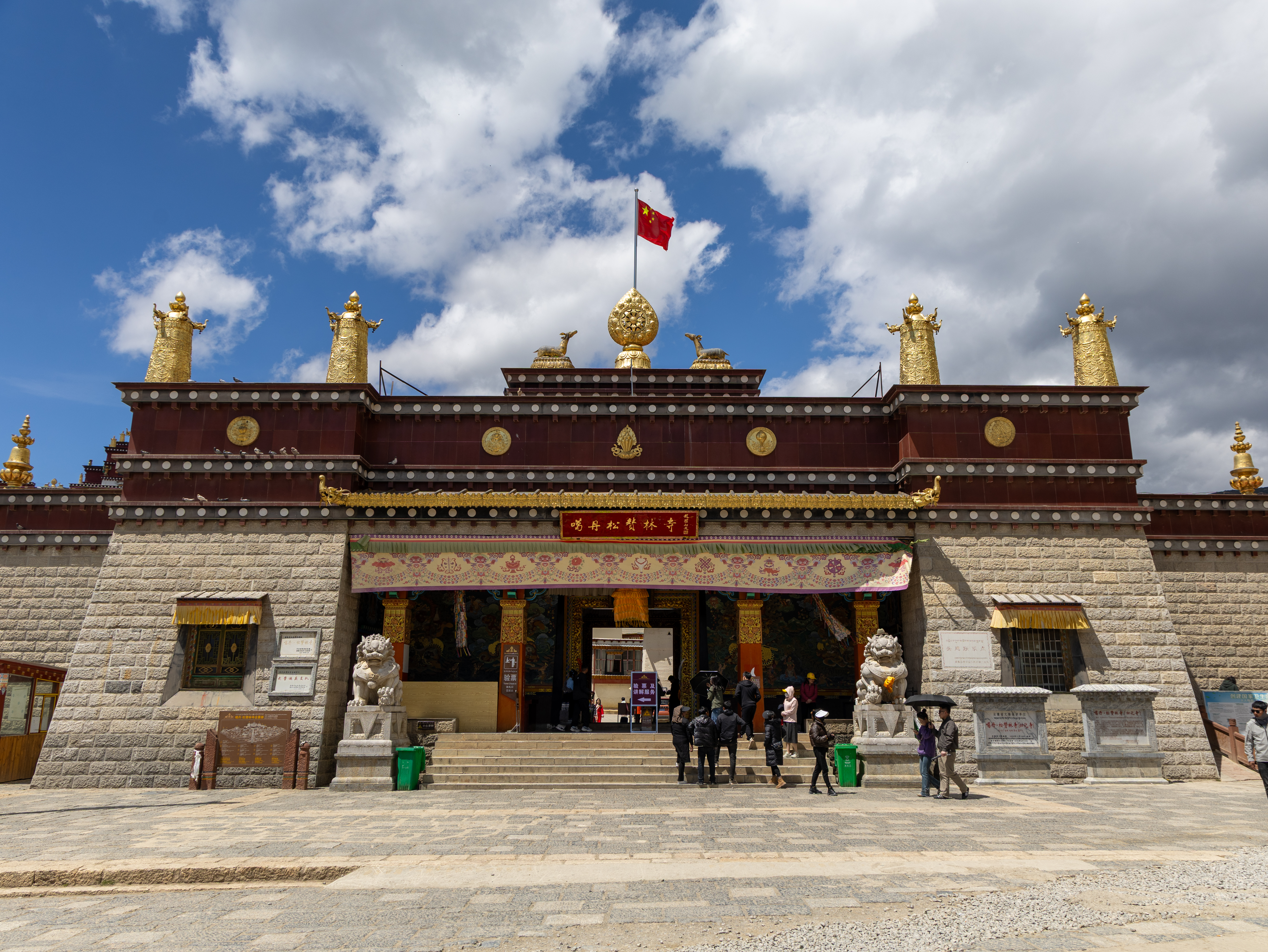
Main Gate

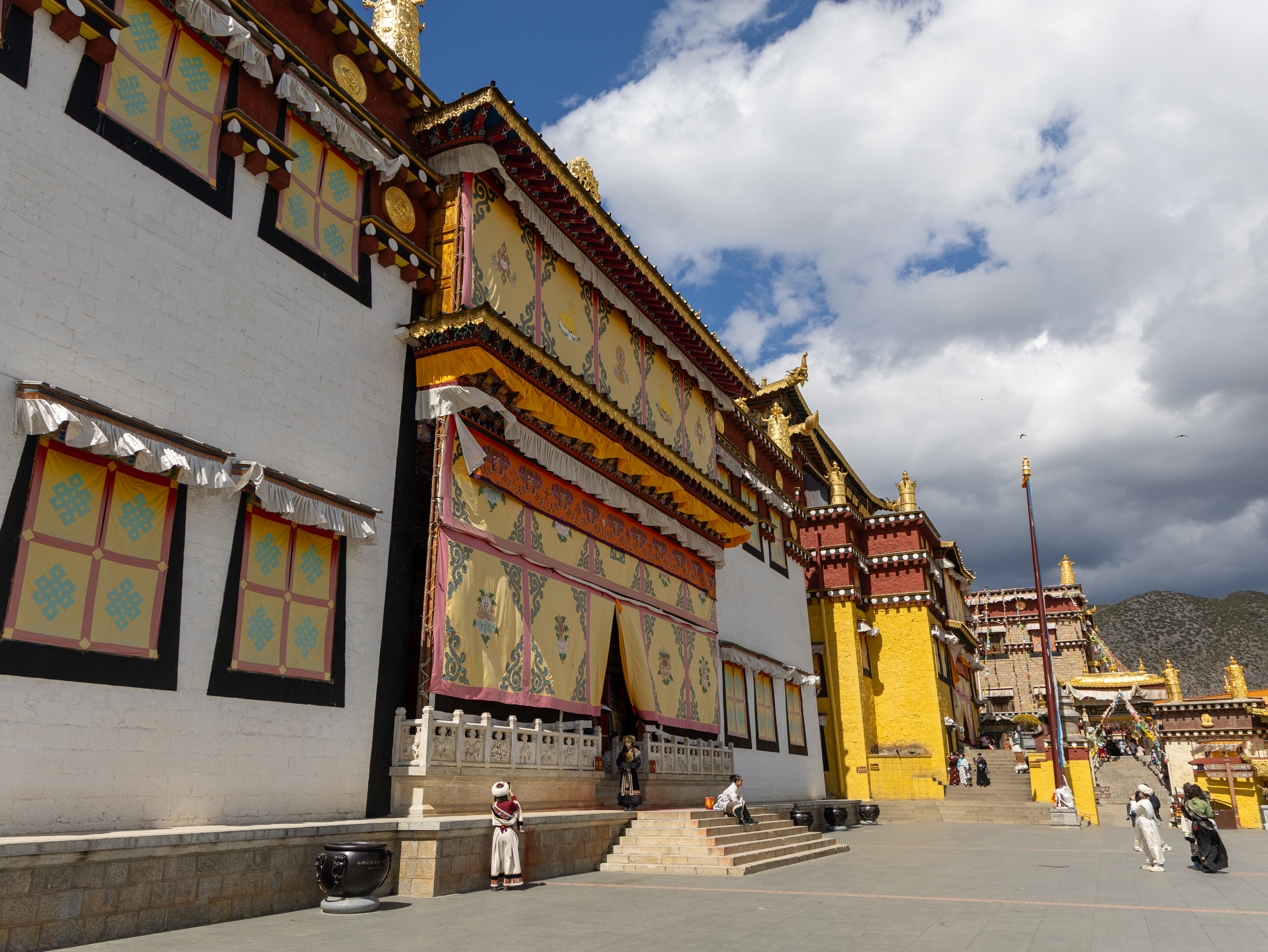
Dratsang Hall

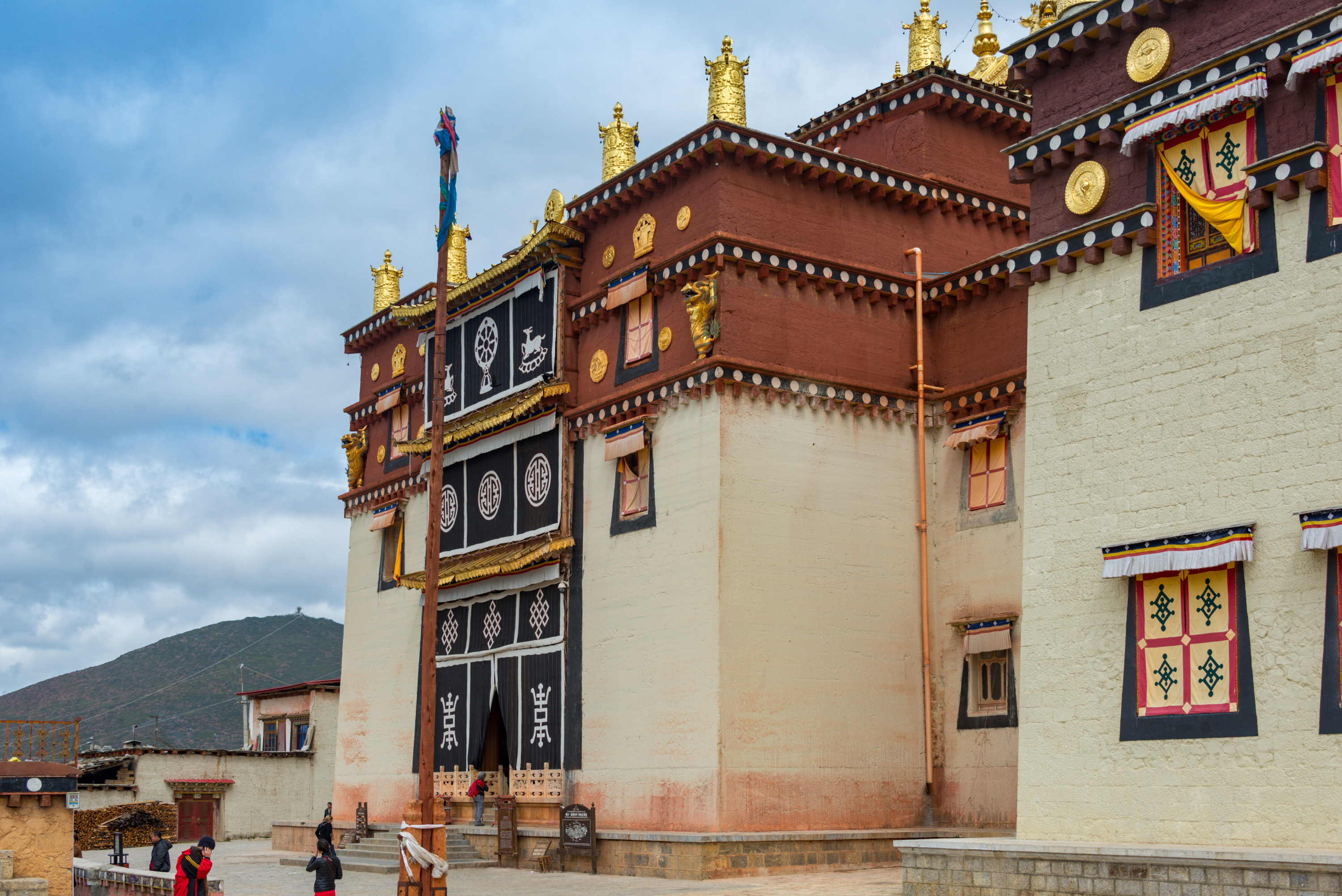
Master Tsongkhapa Hall

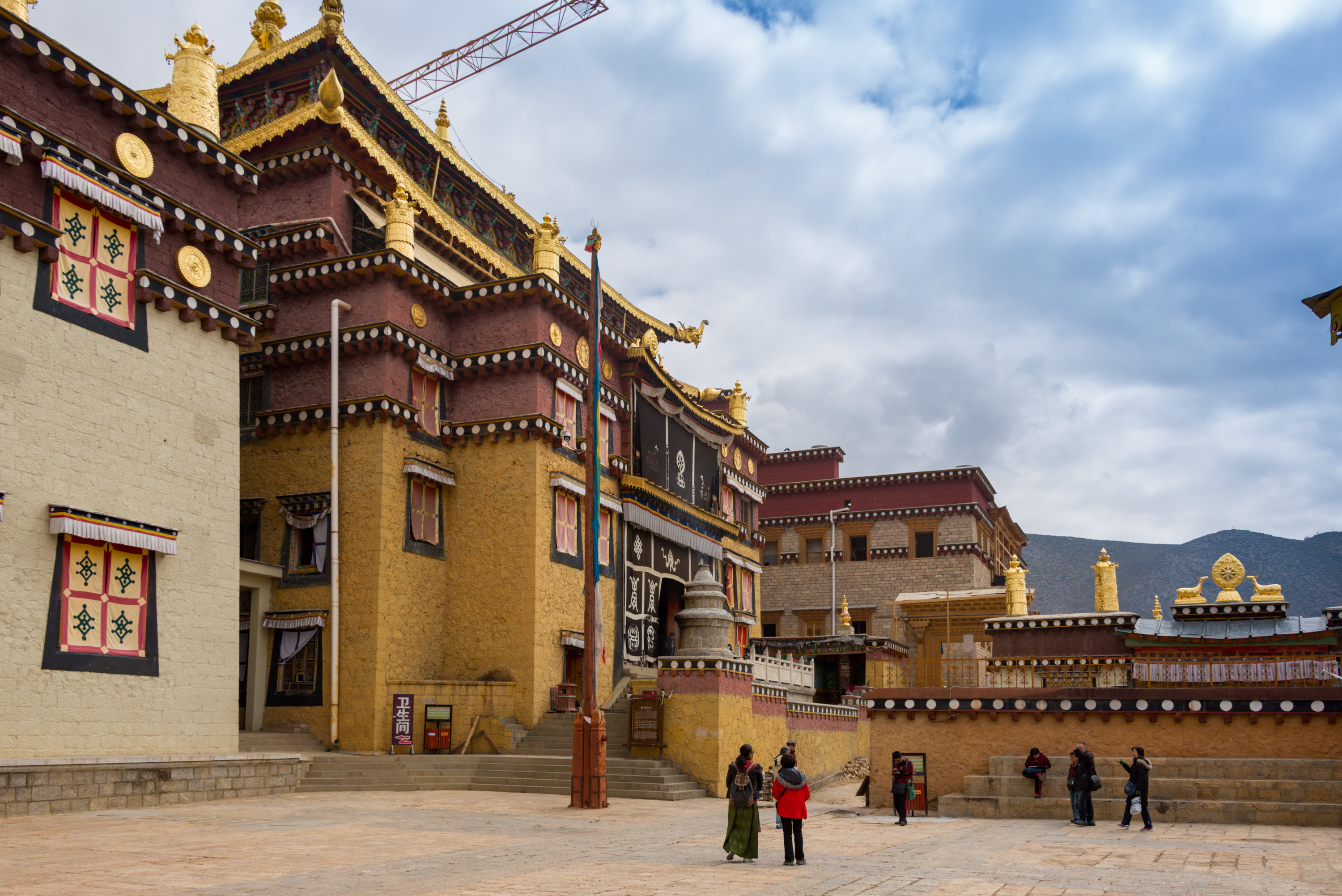
Sakyamuni Hall

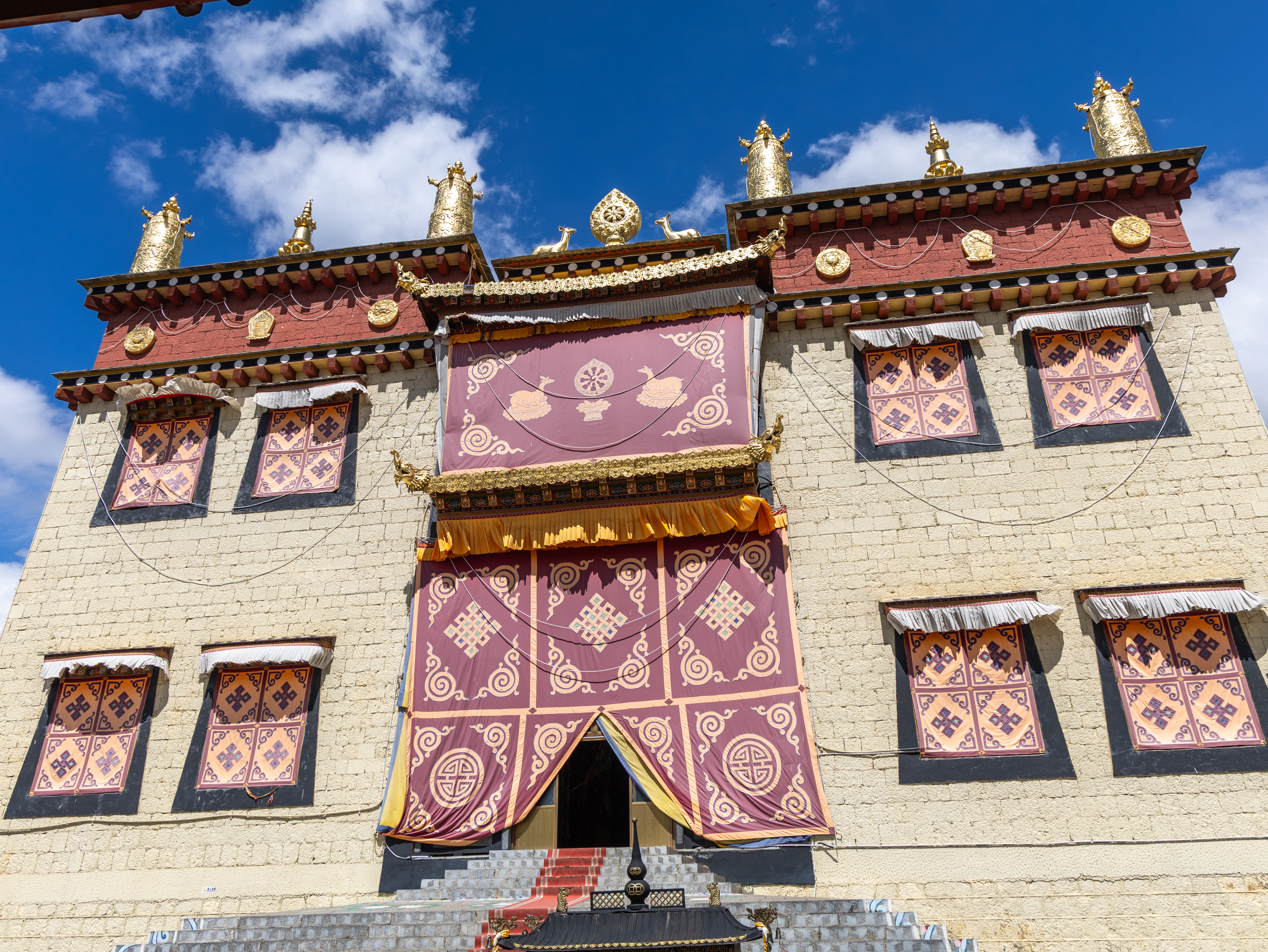
Duke Khamtsen

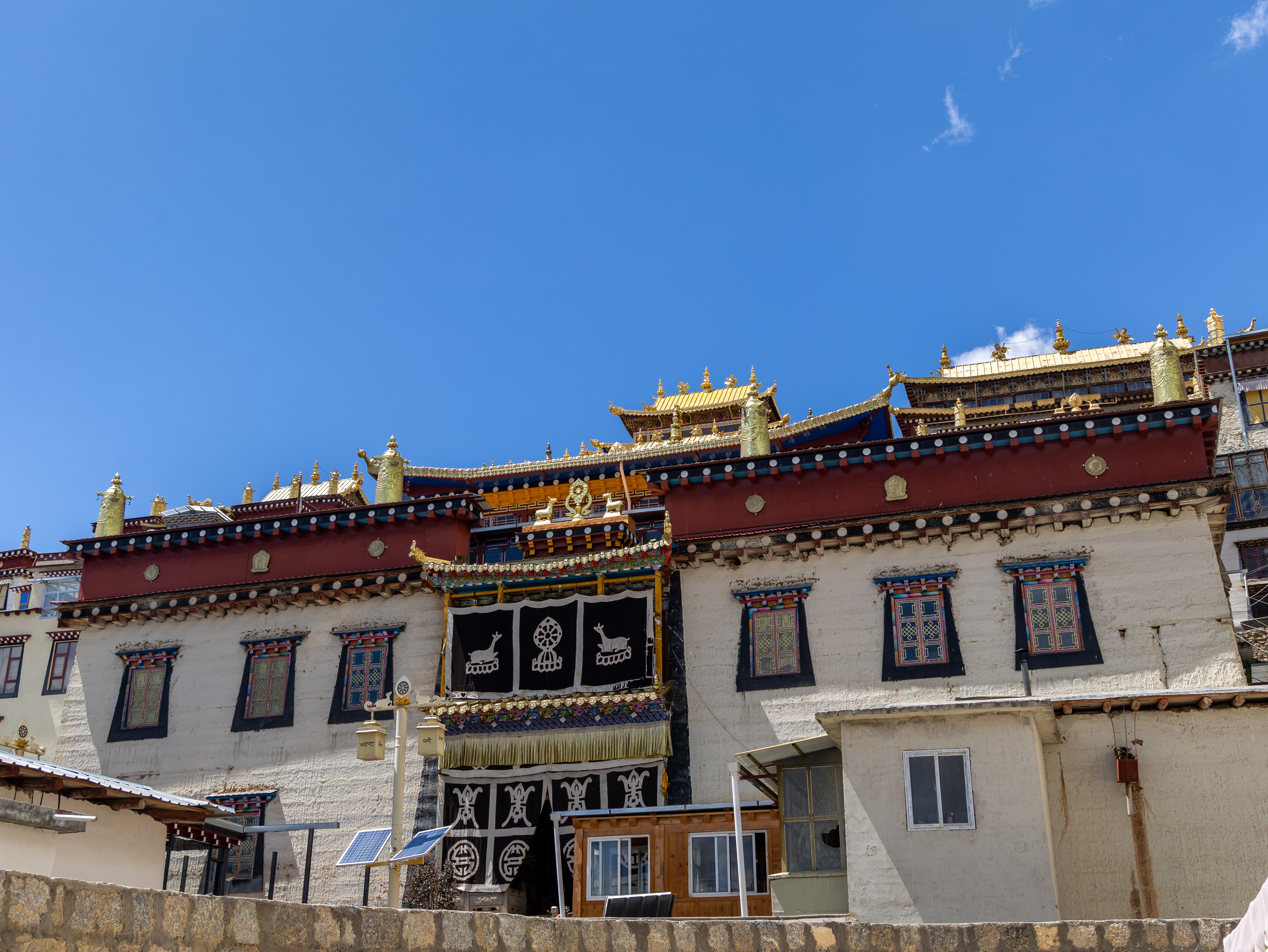
Gro Khamtsen

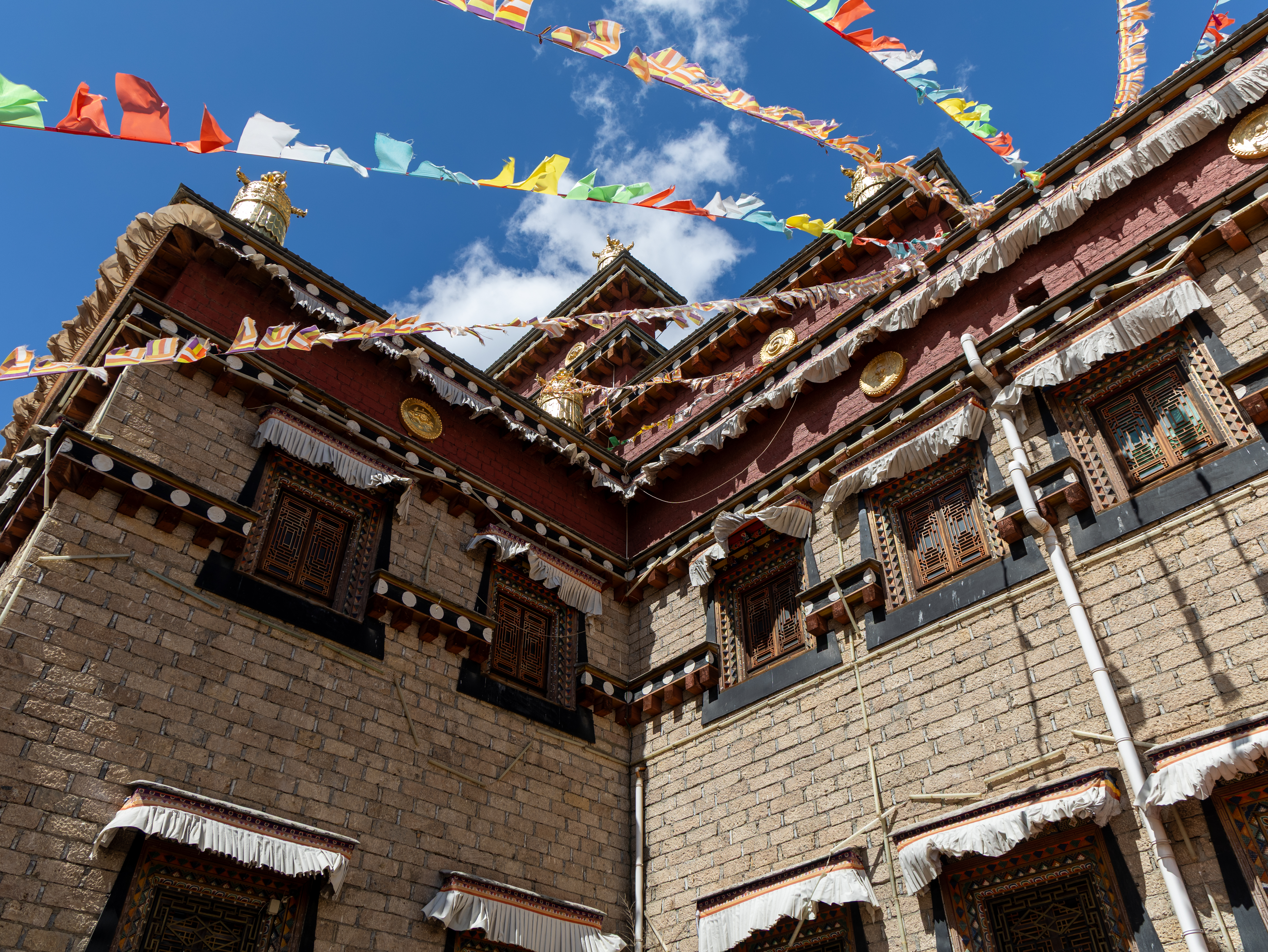
Rongba Khamtsen

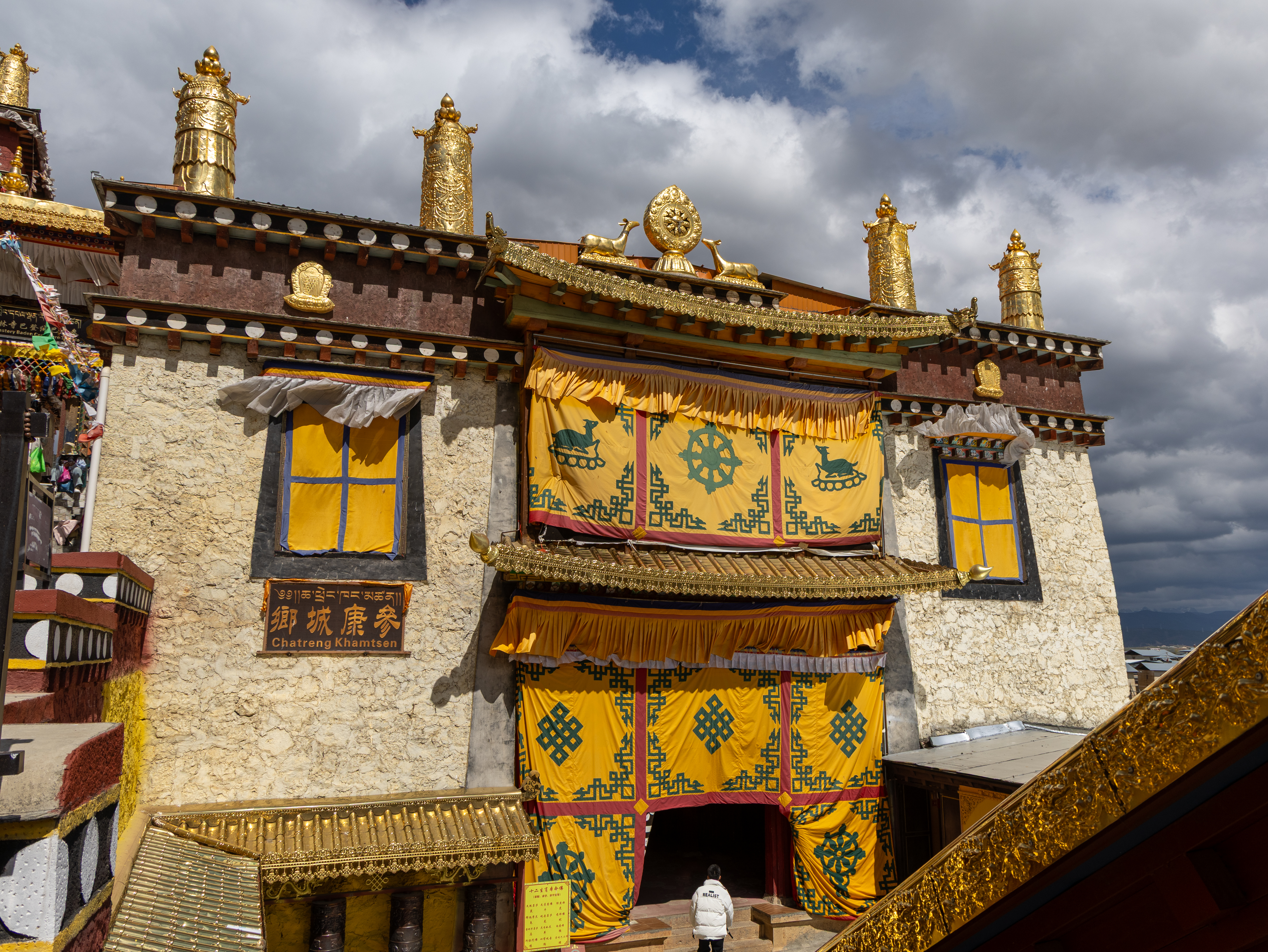
Xiangcheng Khamtsen

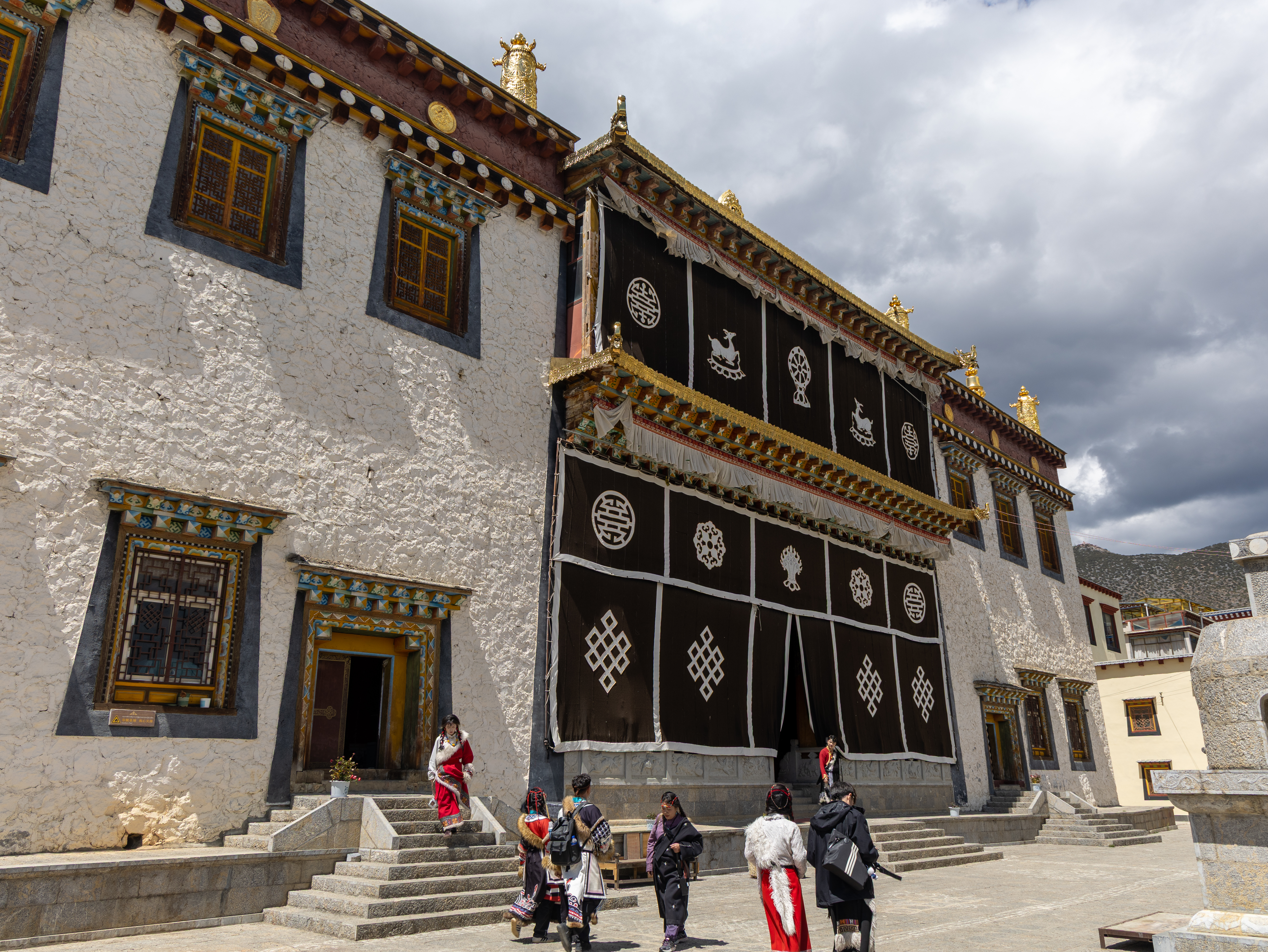
Yangtang Khamtsen
Panorama of Ganden Sumtseling Monastery

== Festivals ==
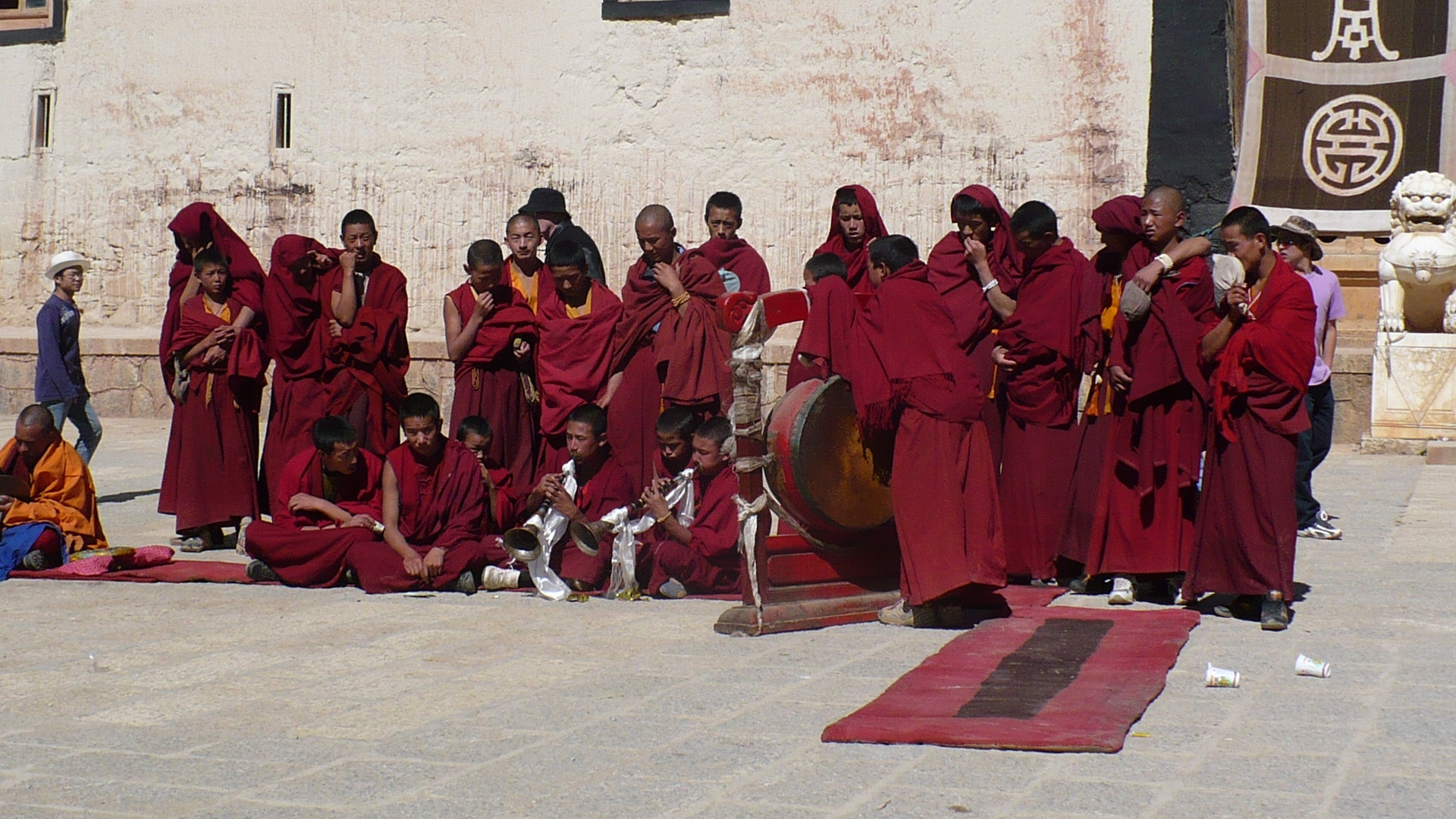
Monks in Ganden Somtseling Monastery

The Gedong Festival is held in the precincts of the monastery annually on 29 November when devotees from the region attend to worship and also to witness the religious mask dances – the Cham dance – that are performed by the monks in colourful costumes depicting deities, ghosts and animals.

A three-day 'Horse Racing Festival' also known as 'Heavenly Steed Festival' is held at Zandiaong, some time in June (according to the lunar calendar: 5th day of the 5th month), to the south east of the town, which involves dancing, singing and eating, in addition to the racing of horses. Horse traders assemble here in their finest attire of furs and silks. Families of villagers camp in tents at the designated horse racing meadow land at an elevation of 3,288 metres (10,787 ft).

A new festival introduced in 1990s is called the 'Minority Festival' held in September when artists from neighbouring districts and Tibet participate to present their art forms.
