= Luoji Township =

Luoji Township may refer to several places in China:

- Luoji Township, Lu'an (罗集乡), in Yu'an District, Lu'an, Anhui
- Luoji Township, Xiayi County (骆集乡), in Xiayi County, Henan
- Luoji Township, Shangri-La County (洛吉乡), in Yunnan
