= Allium trifurcatum =

三柱韭 san zhu jiu

Scientific classification
- Kingdom: Plantae
- Clade: Tracheophytes
- Clade: Angiosperms
- Clade: Monocots
- Order: Asparagales
- Family: Amaryllidaceae
- Subfamily: Allioideae
- Genus: Allium
- Species: A. trifurcatum

Binomial name
- Allium trifurcatum (F.T. Wang & T. Tang) J.M. Xu

Synonyms
- Allium humile var. trifurcatum F.T. Wang & T. Tang

Species of plant

Allium trifurcatum is a plant species native to the Sichuan and Yunnan regions in southern China. It grows at elevations of 3000–4000 m. The Tibetan people of Shangri-La and nearby areas eat its scapes.

Allium trifurcatum has thick roots and clusters of bulbs. Scape is up to 20 cm tall, round in cross-section. Leaves are flat, up to 10 mm across, shorter than the scape. Umbels have only a few white flowers.
