= Dukezong =

Coordinates: 27°48′39″N 99°42′00″E

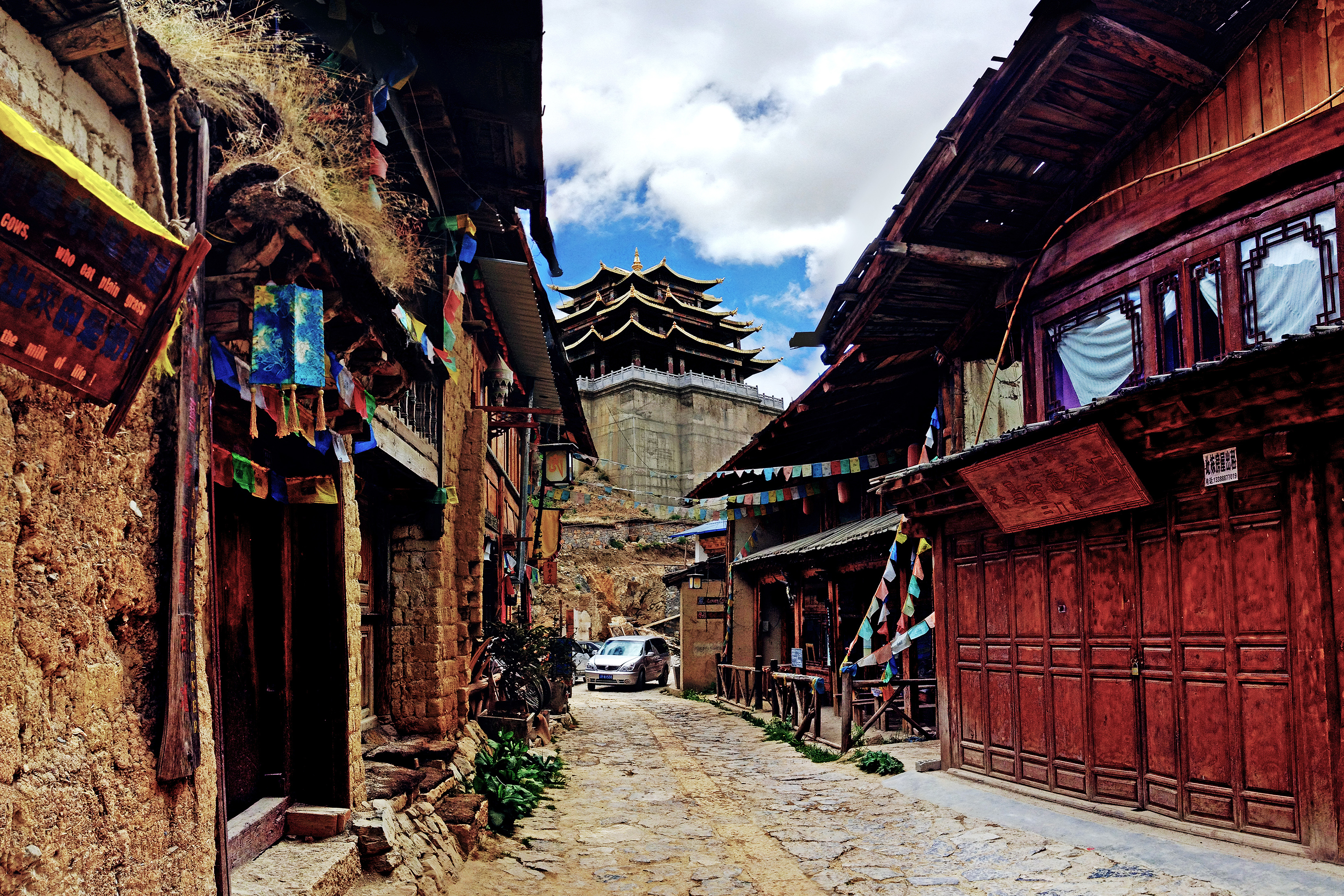
Jinlong Street (金龙街) of Dukezong before the fire in 2013

Dukezong (simplified Chinese: 独克宗; traditional Chinese: 獨克宗; pinyin: Dúkèzōng) or Dorkhar is the historical center of Shangri-La City (Gyalthang), Dêqên Tibetan Autonomous Prefecture, Yunnan province, China.

== History ==
The town is over thirteen hundred years old. In January 2014, a fire lasting over ten hours broke out destroying most of the town. There were no injuries or deaths reported, but over two thousand six hundred people had to be evacuated. Many buildings, including one statue that was from the seventeenth century, were destroyed.
