= Qiaotou =

Qiaotou (Chinese: traditional 橋頭, simplified 桥头, Qiáotóu, literally "Bridgehead") may refer to the following places:

== Mainland China ==
Towns

- Qiaotou, Dongguan, Guangdong
- Qiaotou, Yongjia County, Zhejiang
- Hutiaoxia Town, formerly Qiaotou, Shangri-La County, Yunnan

Townships

- Qiaotou Township, Shenze County, Hebei
- Qiaotou Township, Baoding, in Yi County, Hebei

== Taiwan ==
- Ciaotou District, Kaohsiung, Republic of China (Taiwan)
