= Luoji Township, Shangri-La =

Luoji Township 洛吉乡
- Township
- Location within Yunnan
- Coordinates: 27°47′40″N 100°12′19″E
- Country: China
- Province: Yunnan
- Prefecture: Dêqên
- County: Shangri-La

Area
  - Total: 1,041.15 km^{2} (401.99 sq mi)
- Elevation: 2,197 m (7,208 ft)

Population (2006)
  - Total: 4,254
  - Density: 4.086/km^{2} (10.58/sq mi)
- Time zone: UTC+8 (China Standard)
- Postal code: 674409
- Area code: 0887

Luoji Township (simplified Chinese: 洛吉乡; traditional Chinese: 洛吉鄉; pinyin: Luòjí Xiāng) is a township in northwestern Yunnan province, Southwest China. It is under the administration of Shangri-La County, the seat of which lies 49 kilometres (30 mi) to the west. Its seat is the village of Luoji (洛吉村), connected by road to Zhongdian and the villages of Jiulong (九龙村) and Niru (尼汝村), the other major villages in the township. Other villages of note include Mushengtu, Laohuofang, and Duiwoluo. The township covers an area of 1,041 square kilometres (402 sq mi) and is semi mountainous, with the mountainous areas and heavier rainfall to the northwest. Its highest point is Mount Nengnabu (4,495 metres (14,747 ft)) near Niru, and the lowest point is at the Jinsha River (1,503 metres (4,931 ft)) and there is an estimated total of 72 peaks in the township. It has an estimated population of 4,254 (928 households), the main ethnic groups being 37% Han, 26% Yi, 16% Tibetan, 14% Naxi and 1% Lisu. The main rivers are the Jinsha River, the Luoji River and the Niru River.

== Economy ==
The vast majority in the township are employed in agriculture, taking advantage of the rich soils in the lower valleys to the south in which two crops are harvested each year, in June and October. The main crops grown are rice, wheat, corn and potatoes and many farmers rear animals. 5954 mu (3969 km^{2}) is allocated to farmland, 1,400,400 mu (933600 km^{2}) to pasture land and 5,900,000 mu (3,900,000 km^{2}) is forest within Luoji Township. Occasionally the forest is prone to fires, one outbreak affected some 187 hectares of land and required over a thousand people to subdue it. The township is particularly noted for its matsutake mushrooms, growing wild on the hillsides rather than cultivated. They have strict rules laid down by the local government for picking, such as not to pick young mushrooms smaller than 6 cm. The township also grows a medicinal plant in the wild called chongcao, which also earns a considerable revenue. There is a pine wood crafting factory in the main town of Luoji. The township contains 15 schools, with 37 teachers and 506 students as of the last census.

=== Dam Project ===
The Dêqên Prefecture Niru River Muxingtu Hydropower Station Project is proposed on the main stream of the Niru River, 5 km away from Luoji Township. The aim of the proposed project is to utilise the hydro sources of the river to provide electricity needs in Yunnan. The plant would supply energy to the China Southern Power Grid Company (CSPG) through the Yunnan Provincial Power Grid Company, capable of generating an annual 516,700 MWh, with a total installed capacity of total installed capacity of 120 MW. The proposed plant is expected to reduce GHG emissions by 407,133 tonne CO_{2} annually.
