= Jiantang =

Jiantang 建塘镇 · རྒྱལ་ཐང་རྡལ།
- Town
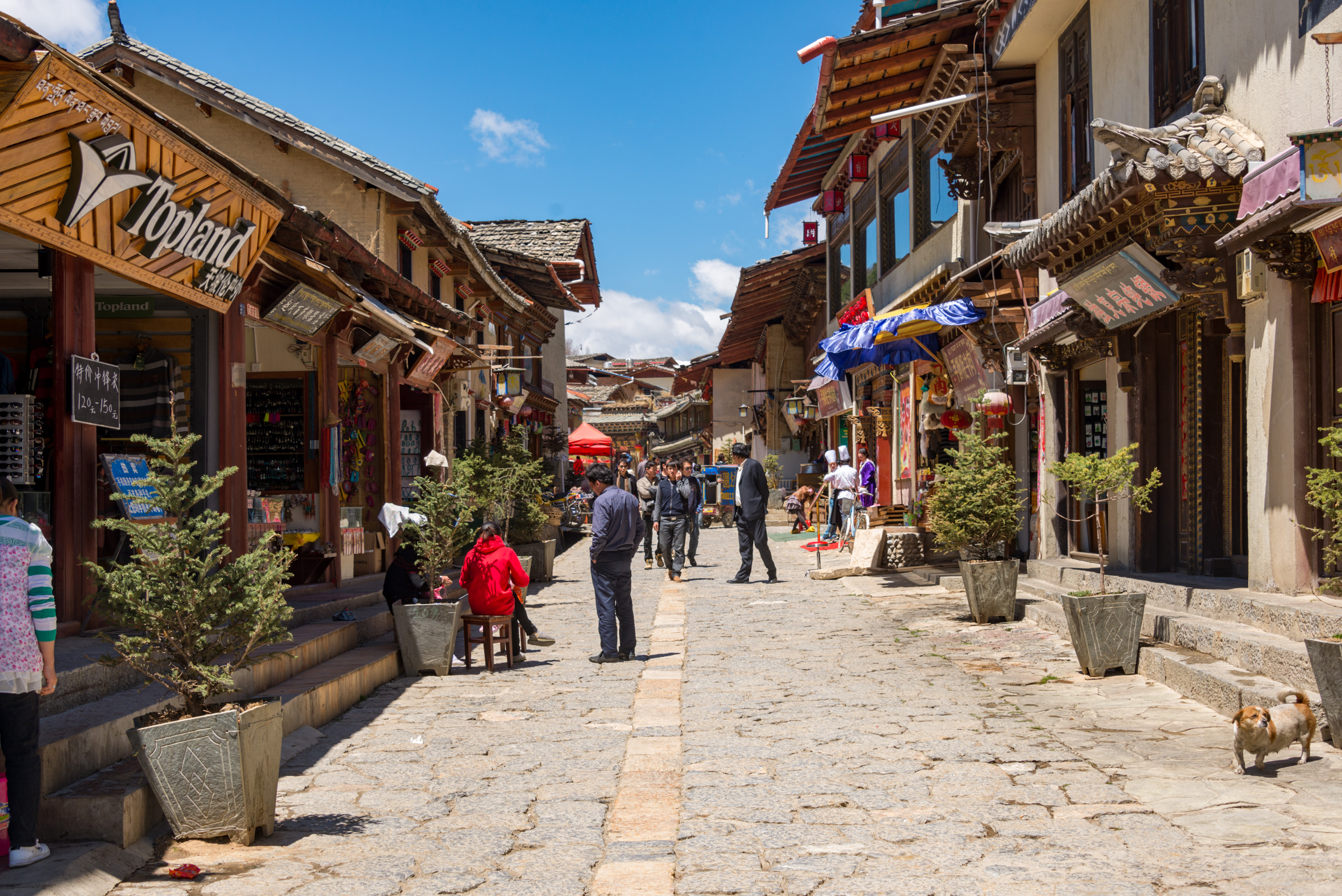
- Historical center of Jiantang

- Location within Yunnan
- Coordinates: 27°50′N 99°42′E
- Country: China
- Province: Yunnan
- Prefecture: Dêqên Tibetan Autonomous Prefecture
- County: Shangri-La County
- Elevation: 3,282 m (10,768 ft)
- Time zone: UTC+8 (CST)

Jiantang

Chinese name
- Chinese: 建塘
Transcriptions
Standard Mandarin
- Hanyu Pinyin: Jiàntáng

Tibetan name
- Tibetan: རྒྱལ་ཐང།
Transcriptions
- Wylie: rgyal thang
- Tibetan Pinyin: Gyaitang

Jiantang or Gyaitang (Gyälthang) is a town in northern Yunnan, seat of Shangri-La County and Dêqên Tibetan Autonomous Prefecture.

== Languages ==
Khams Tibetan and Southwestern Mandarin are the main languages spoken in the town. Selibu is a Mandarin–Tibetan mixed language spoken by approximately 900 ethnic Hui people in the town.

== Climate ==
Jiantang has a subtropical highland climate (Cwb) with little to no rainfall from November to April and moderate to heavy rainfall from May to October.

Climate data for Jiantang
Month	Jan	Feb	Mar	Apr	May	Jun	Jul	Aug	Sep	Oct	Nov	Dec	Year
Mean daily maximum °C (°F)	7.4 (45.3)	7.9 (46.2)	10.7 (51.3)	13.5 (56.3)	17.1 (62.8)	18.3 (64.9)	18.4 (65.1)	18.1 (64.6)	16.9 (62.4)	14.6 (58.3)	11.2 (52.2)	8.6 (47.5)	13.6 (56.4)
Daily mean °C (°F)	0.3 (32.5)	1.4 (34.5)	4.2 (39.6)	7.2 (45.0)	11.1 (52.0)	13.5 (56.3)	14.1 (57.4)	13.6 (56.5)	12.3 (54.1)	8.9 (48.0)	4.4 (39.9)	1.4 (34.5)	7.7 (45.9)
Mean daily minimum °C (°F)	−6.7 (19.9)	−5.1 (22.8)	−2.3 (27.9)	1.0 (33.8)	5.1 (41.2)	8.7 (47.7)	9.9 (49.8)	9.2 (48.6)	7.8 (46.0)	3.3 (37.9)	−2.3 (27.9)	−5.7 (21.7)	1.9 (35.4)
Average rainfall mm (inches)	5 (0.2)	11 (0.4)	22 (0.9)	36 (1.4)	59 (2.3)	127 (5.0)	194 (7.6)	171 (6.7)	102 (4.0)	61 (2.4)	13 (0.5)	6 (0.2)	807 (31.6)
Source: Climate-Data.org
