= Hutiaoxia Town =

Town in Yunnan Province, China

Coordinates: 27°13′00″N 100°09′00″E

Hutiaoxia Town 虎跳峡镇
- Town
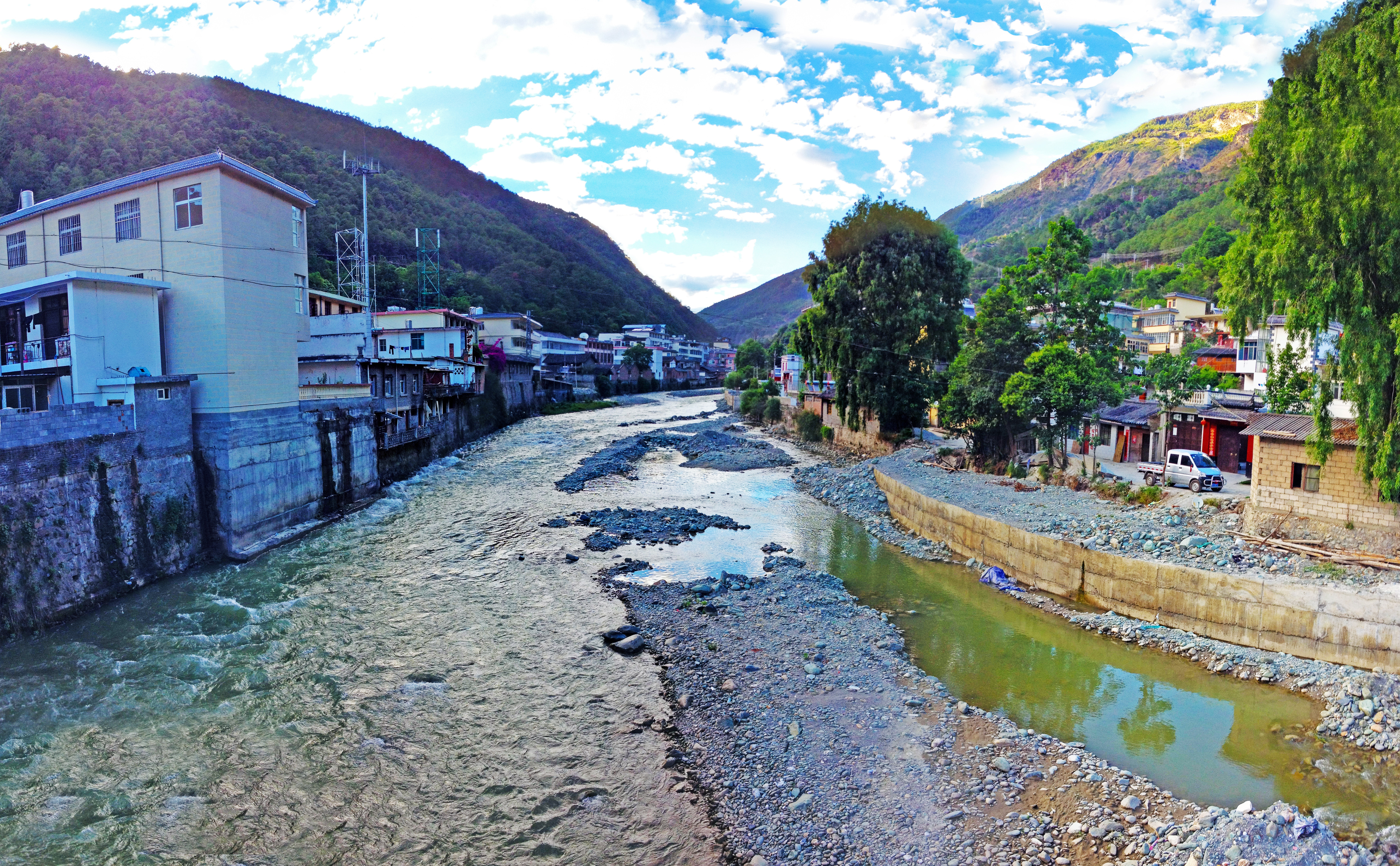
- Hutiaoxia Town
- Interactive map of Hutiaoxia Town
- Country: China
- Province: Yunnan
- Autonomous prefecture: Diqing
- County-level city: Shangri-La

Hutiaoxia Town (simplified Chinese: 虎跳峡镇; traditional Chinese: 虎跳峽鎮; pinyin: Hǔtiào Xiá Zhèn; lit. 'Tiger Leaping Gorge Town'), formerly Qiaotou (桥头 Qiáotóu; lit. "Bridgehead"), is a small town located on the Yangtze River in Shangri-La County (formerly Zhongdian County) adjacent to Lijiang City, Yunnan Province, China. Hutiaoxia is the south end of the famous Tiger Leaping Gorge hiking route, the other end of which is Daju in Lijiang. There are several buses to Shangri-La County which pass through Hutiaoxia.
