= Shangri-La, Yunnan =

Shangri-La 香格里拉市 · སེམས་ཀྱི་ཉི་ཟླ་གྲོང་ཁྱེར།
- County-level city
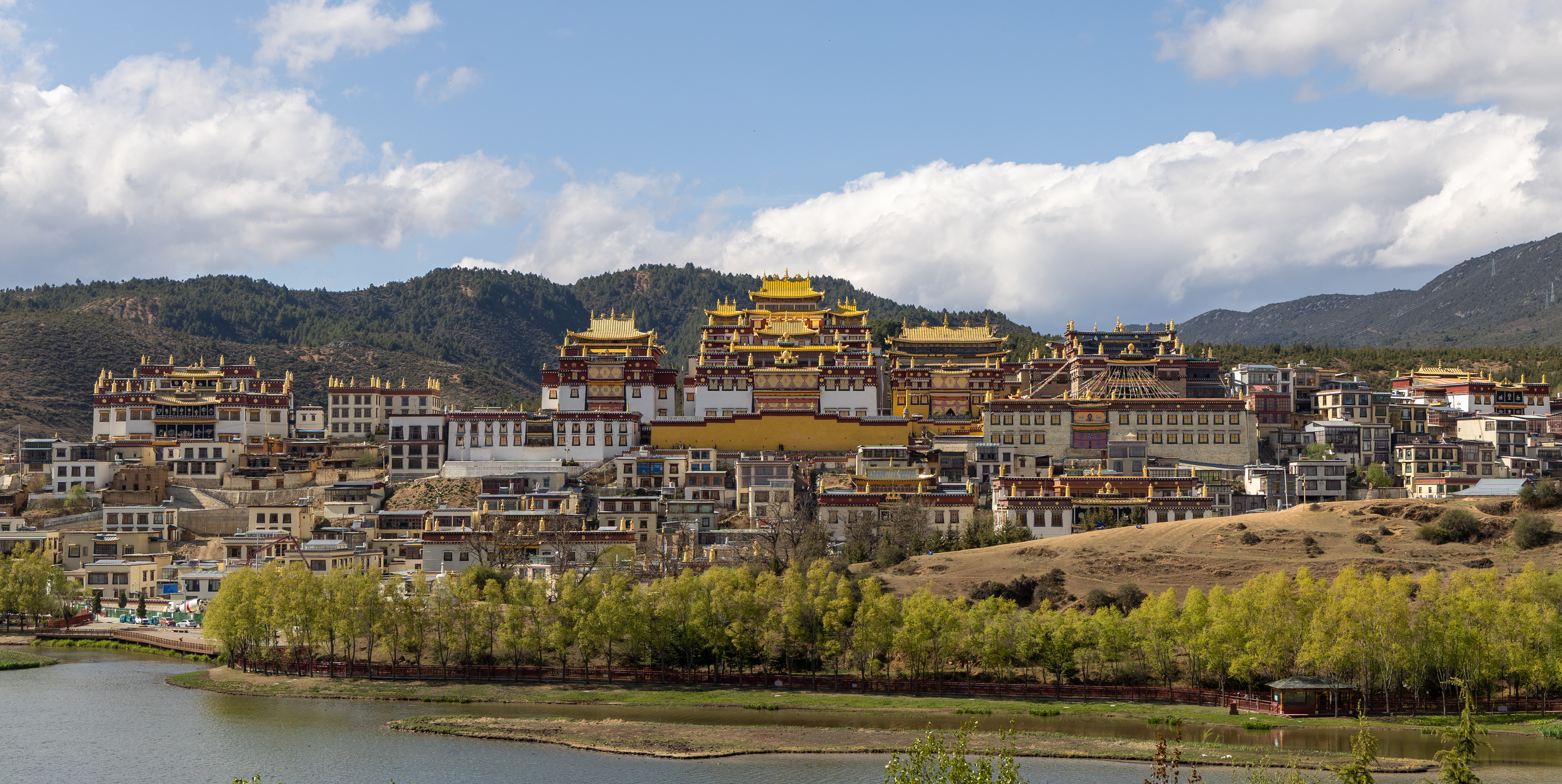
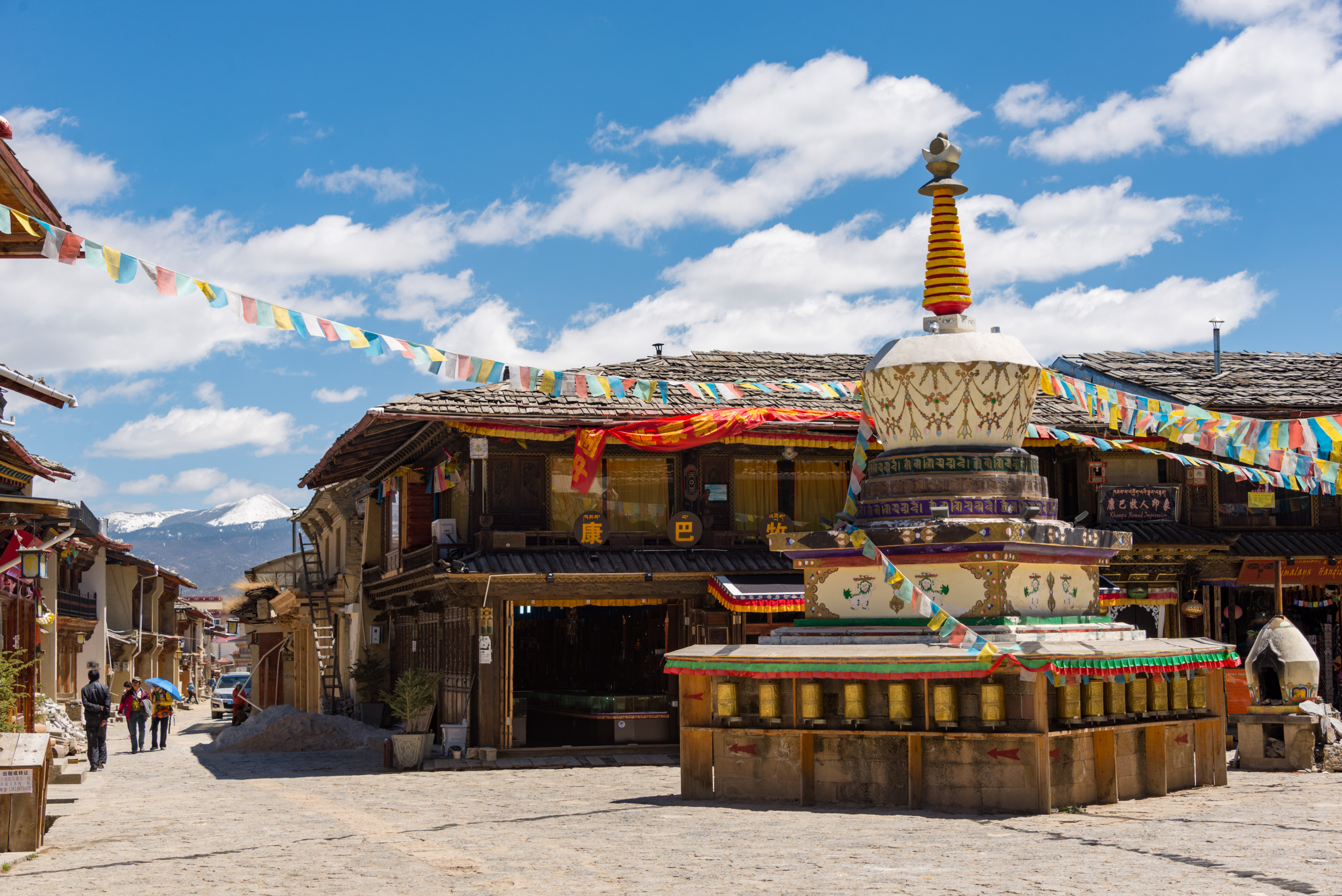
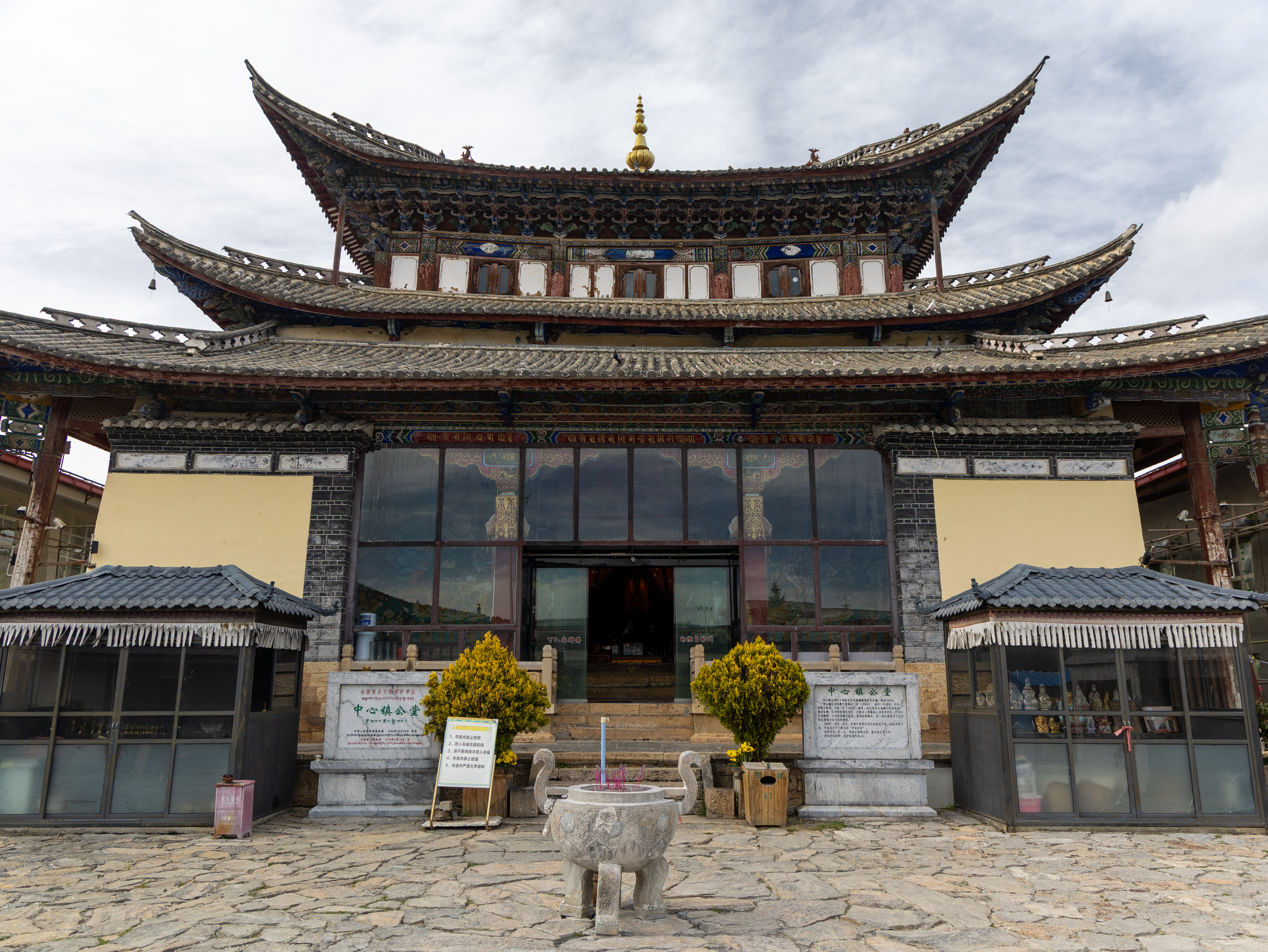
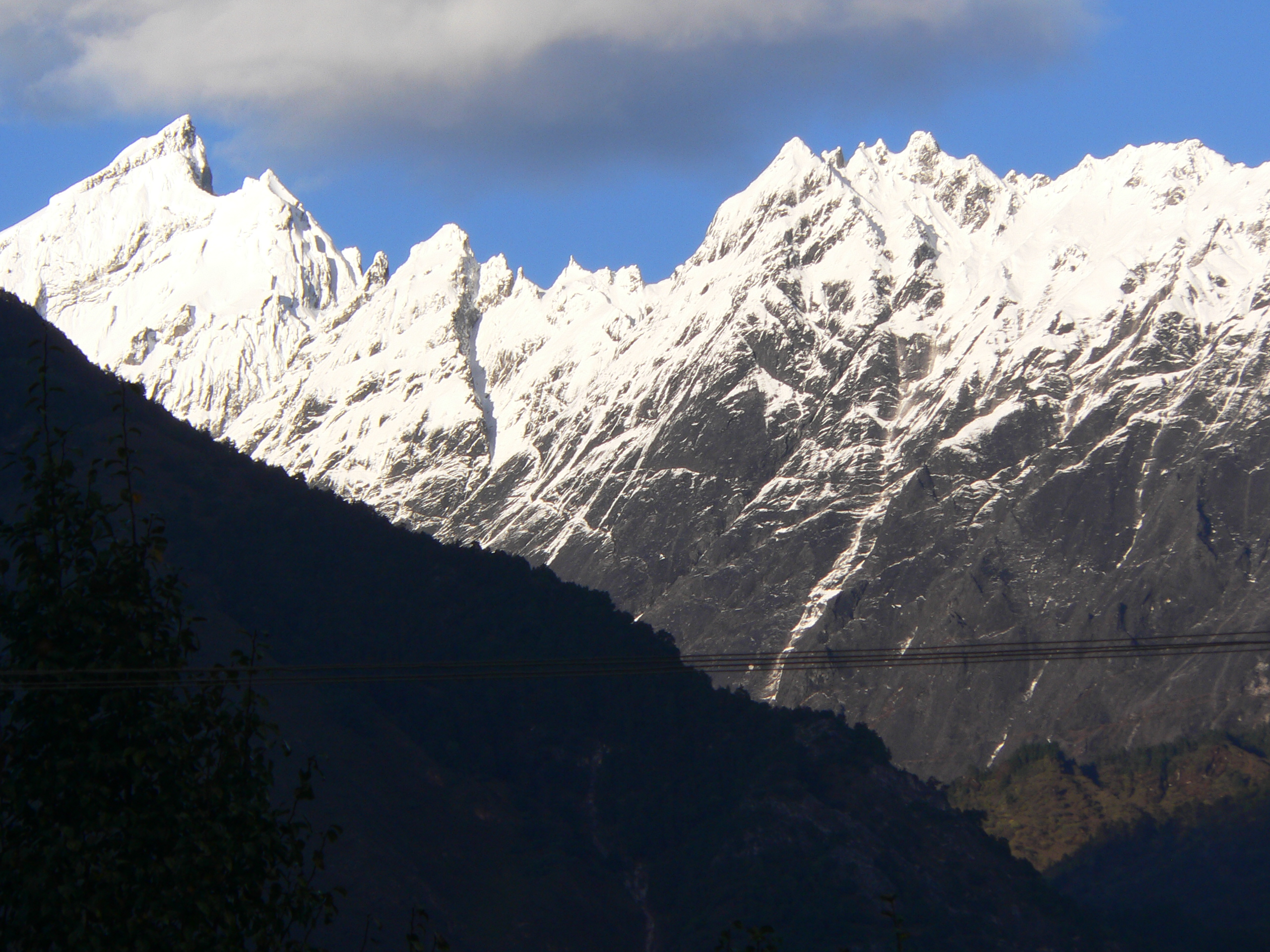
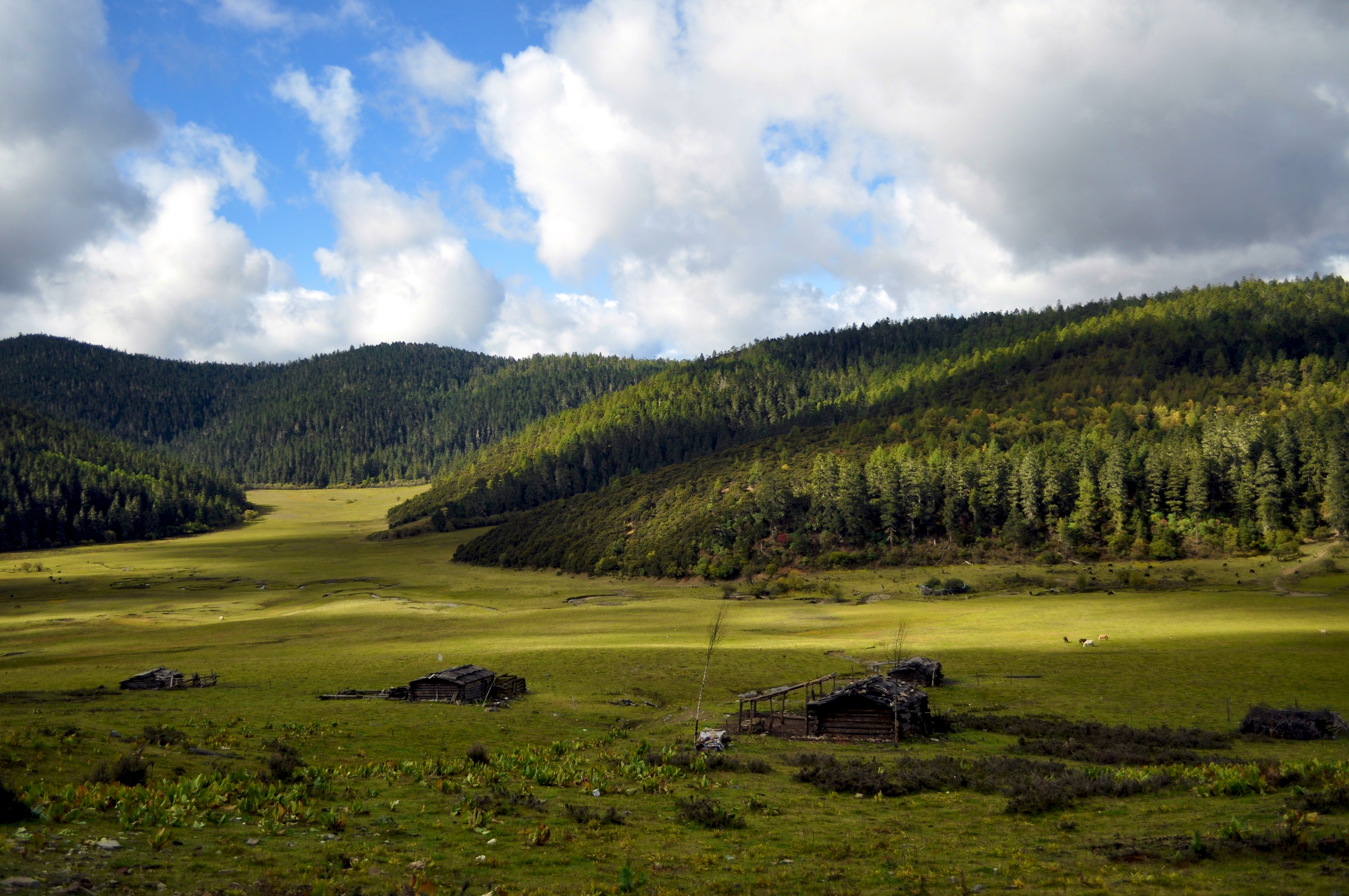
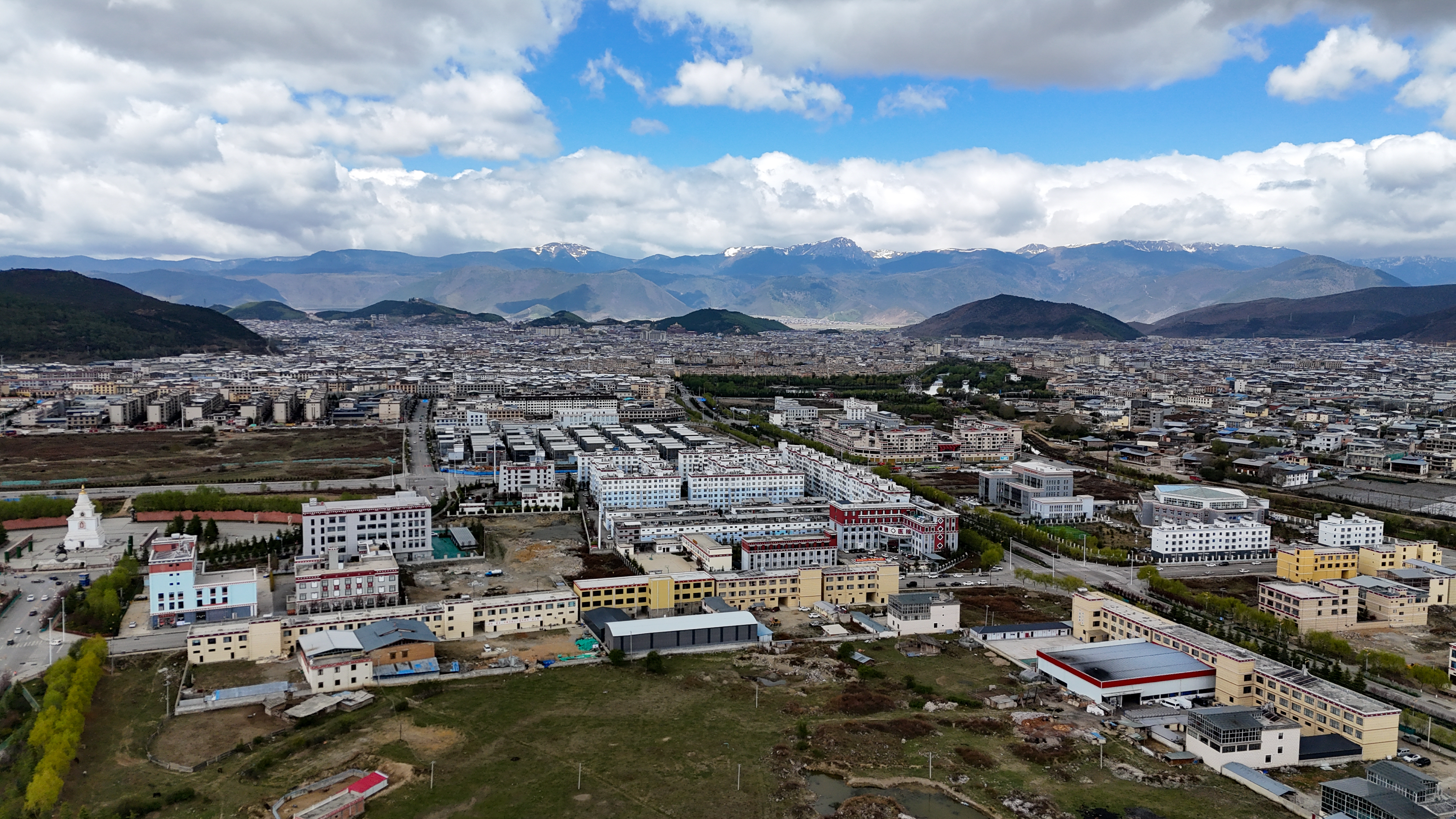
- Ganden Sumtseling Monastery Dukezong old town Zhongxin Assembly Hall Haba Snow Mountain Potatson National Park Skyline of city

- Location of Shangri-La (red) in Diqing Tibetan Autonomous Prefecture (pink) within Yunnan

- Location of the county seat in Yunnan
- Coordinates (Diqing Prefecture government): 27°49′30″N 99°42′09″E
- Country: China
- Province: Yunnan
- Autonomous prefecture: Diqing
- Municipal seat: Gyalthang Town

Area
  - Total: 11,613 km^{2} (4,484 sq mi)
- Elevation: 3,160 m (10,370 ft)

Population (2020 census)
  - Total: 186,412
  - Density: 16.052/km^{2} (41.575/sq mi)
- Time zone: UTC+8 (China Standard)
- Postal code: 674400
- Area code: 0887
- Website: xianggelila.diqing.gov.cn

Shangri-La, Yunnan

Chinese name
- Chinese: 香格里拉
Transcriptions
Standard Mandarin
- Hanyu Pinyin: Xiānggélǐlā
Yue: Cantonese
- Jyutping: Hoeng^{1}gaak^{3}lei^{5}laai^{1}

Alternative Chinese name
- Chinese: 中甸
Transcriptions
Standard Mandarin
- Hanyu Pinyin: Zhōngdiān
Yue: Cantonese
- Jyutping: Zung^{1}din^{6}

Tibetan name
- Tibetan: སེམས་ཀྱི་ཉི་ཟླ།
Transcriptions
- Wylie: sems kyi nyi zla
- Tibetan Pinyin: Semkyi'nyida

Shangri-La (Chinese: 香格里拉; pinyin: Xiānggélǐlā; Tibetan: སེམས་ཀྱི་ཉི་ཟླ།) is a county-level city in northwestern Yunnan province, China, named after Shangri-La, the mythical land depicted in the 1933 novel Lost Horizon. It is the capital and largest city of Diqing Tibetan Autonomous Prefecture. It is bordered by the city of Lijiang to the south and Sichuan province to the northwest, north, and east.

== Geography ==
Shangri-La City is located in the east of Diqing Prefecture, in northwestern Yunnan. It borders Daocheng County and Muli County, Sichuan to the east, Yulong County of Lijiang and Weixi County to the south, Deqin County to the west, and Derong County and Xiangcheng County of Sichuan to the north and northwest.

== Name ==
The city was originally a county named Zhongdian (中甸县; Zhōngdiàn Xiàn); the Tibetan population referred to the area by its traditional name Gyalthang (Tibetan: རྒྱལ་ཐང་, Wylie: rgyal thang, ZWPY: Gyaitang), meaning "royal plains". On 17 December 2001, the Chinese government renamed the county "Shangri-La", after the fictional land of Shangri-La in the 1933 James Hilton novel Lost Horizon. This renaming, along with the county's upgrade to a county-level city on 16 December 2014, was part of an effort by the Chinese government to promote tourism in the area. The Chinese name of the county seat, Jiantang (建塘; Jiàntáng), reflects a Mandarin transliteration of Gyalthang.

== History ==
In the early morning of 11 January 2014, a fire broke out in the 1,000-year-old Dukezong Tibetan neighborhood. About 242 homes and shops were destroyed and 2,600 residents were displaced. About half of the old town was destroyed by the fire. Afterwards, residents were allowed back to their homes and shops. By the end of 2014 rebuilding had started and tourism started to return. Tourism was generally not affected by the fire, since the main sights in the old town, such as the prayer wheel and temples, were not damaged. Many of the other main sights are located outside of the old town.

== Demographics and languages ==
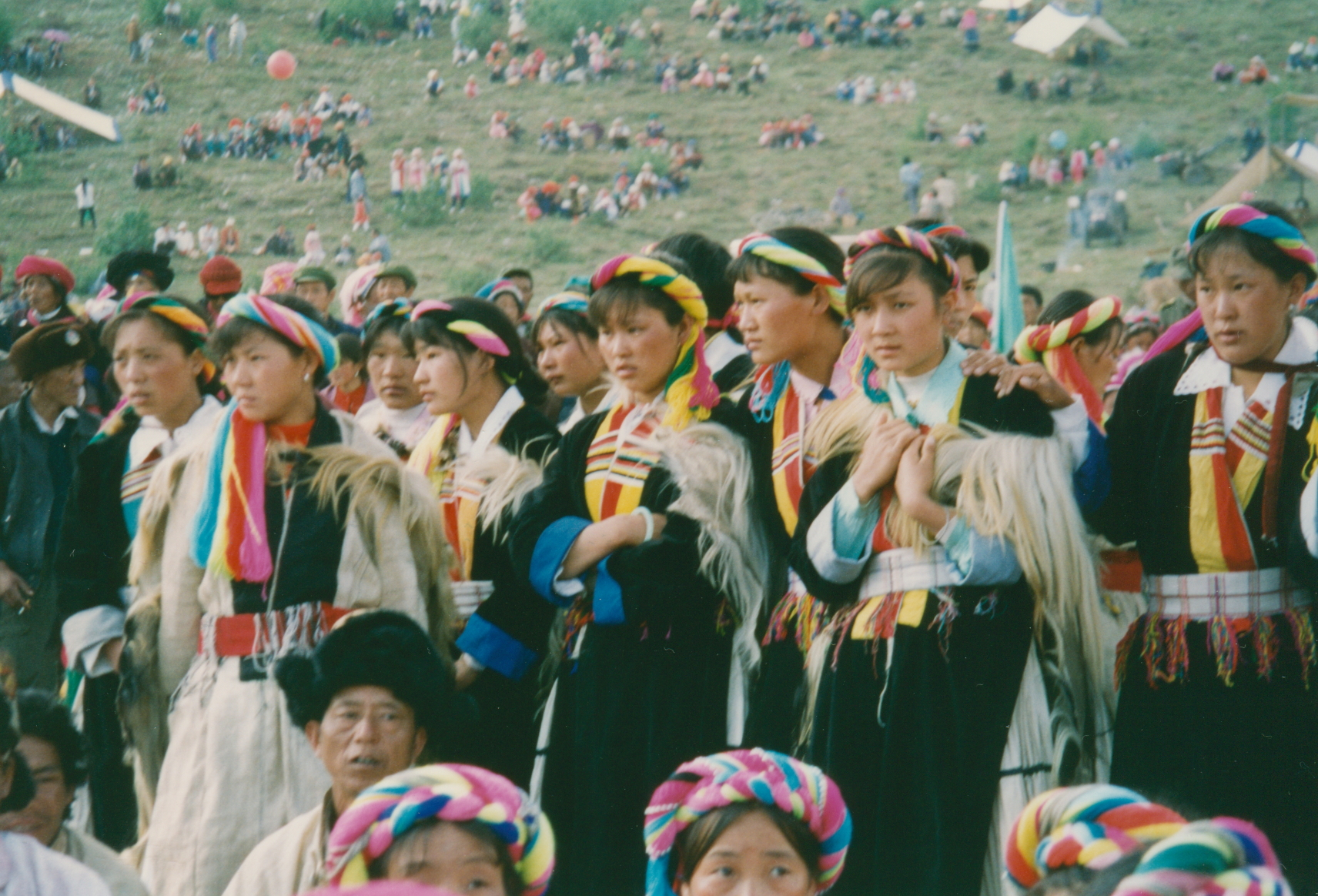
Annual horse-racing festival, 2 June 1995.

The southern half of the city is inhabited by the Naxi people, who speak the Naxi language, a Lolo-Burmese language separate from the Tibetic languages. The northern half is inhabited by the Khampas, who speak the southern variety of Khams Tibetan. Southwestern Mandarin is spoken by the Han Chinese throughout the city.

The ambiance of the town is distinctly Tibetan with prayer flags fluttering, mountains known by holy names, lamaseries and rocks inscribed in the Tibetan language with Buddhist sutras.

== Administrative divisions ==
Shangri-La city has 4 towns, 6 townships and 1 ethnic township.

Name	Simplified Chinese	Hanyu Pinyin	Tibetan	Wylie	Administrative division code
Towns
Gyalthang Town (Jiantang)	建塘镇	Jiàntáng zhèn	རྒྱལ་ཐང་གྲོང་རྡལ།	rgyal thang grong rdal	533401101
Yangthang Town (Xiaozhongdian)	小中甸镇 (洋塘镇)	Xiǎozhōngdiàn zhèn	ཡང་ཐང་གྲོང་རྡལ།	yang thang grong rdal	533401102
Hutiaoxia Town	虎跳峡镇	Hǔtiàoxiá zhèn			533401103
Jinjiang Town	金江镇	Jīnjiāng zhèn			533401104
Townships
Shangjiang Township	上江乡	Shàngjiāng xiāng			533401201
Luoji Township	洛吉乡	Luòjí xiāng			533401203
Nyishar Township (Nixi)	尼西乡	Níxī xiāng	ནོར་སྐྱིད་ཞང་།	nyi shar zhang	533401204
Ketsak Township (Gezan)	格咱乡	Gézán xiāng	སྐད་ཚག་ཤང་།	skad tshag shang	533401205
Dorwarong Township (Torwarong, Dongwang)	东旺乡	Dōngwàng xiāng	གཏོར་བ་རོང་ཤང་།	gtor ba rong shang	533401206
Rongpagyurnga Township (Wujing)	五境乡	Wǔjìng xiāng	རོང་པ་སྒྱུར་ལྔ་ཤང་།	rong pa sgyur lnga shang	533401207
Ethnic township
Sanba Naxi Ethnic Township	三坝纳西族乡	Sānbà Nàxīzú xiāng			533401202

== Climate ==
Shangri-La has either a dry-winter, warm-summer humid continental climate (Köppen climate classification: Dwb) using the 0 °C (32 °F) isotherm, or a dry-winter subtropical highland climate (Köppen climate classification: Cwb) using the −3 °C (26.6 °F) isotherm, both of which are unusually cool by Yunnan standards due to the high elevation, which ranges between 2,700 and 3,500 metres (8,900 and 11,500 ft). Winters are chilly but sunny, with a 24-hour January average temperature of -2.0 °C (28.4 °F), while summers are cool, with a 24-hour July average temperature of 13.9 °C (57.0 °F), and feature frequent rain; more than 70% of the annual precipitation is delivered from June to September. The annual mean is 6.32 °C (43.4 °F). Except during the summer, nights are usually sharply cooler than the days. Despite the dryness of the winter, the small amount of precipitation is generally sufficient to cause major transportation dislocations and isolate the area between November and March.

Climate data for Shangri-La, elevation 3,342 m (10,965 ft), (1991–2020 normals, extremes 1971–2020)
Month	Jan	Feb	Mar	Apr	May	Jun	Jul	Aug	Sep	Oct	Nov	Dec	Year
Record high °C (°F)	20.4 (68.7)	18.2 (64.8)	21.5 (70.7)	22.7 (72.9)	24.2 (75.6)	27.3 (81.1)	26.0 (78.8)	26.7 (80.1)	23.8 (74.8)	20.9 (69.6)	20.0 (68.0)	17.9 (64.2)	27.3 (81.1)
Mean daily maximum °C (°F)	6.9 (44.4)	7.8 (46.0)	9.9 (49.8)	13.0 (55.4)	16.8 (62.2)	19.7 (67.5)	19.4 (66.9)	19.2 (66.6)	17.9 (64.2)	14.9 (58.8)	11.6 (52.9)	8.9 (48.0)	13.8 (56.9)
Daily mean °C (°F)	−2.0 (28.4)	0.1 (32.2)	3.0 (37.4)	6.1 (43.0)	10.1 (50.2)	13.8 (56.8)	14.0 (57.2)	13.5 (56.3)	12.1 (53.8)	7.6 (45.7)	2.4 (36.3)	−1.1 (30.0)	6.6 (43.9)
Mean daily minimum °C (°F)	−9.2 (15.4)	−6.1 (21.0)	−2.4 (27.7)	0.6 (33.1)	4.6 (40.3)	9.4 (48.9)	10.6 (51.1)	10.1 (50.2)	8.5 (47.3)	2.3 (36.1)	−4.6 (23.7)	−8.9 (16.0)	1.2 (34.2)
Record low °C (°F)	−23.9 (−11.0)	−20.5 (−4.9)	−17.5 (0.5)	−10 (14)	−7.4 (18.7)	−2.1 (28.2)	1.1 (34.0)	1.0 (33.8)	−3.0 (26.6)	−11.1 (12.0)	−16.5 (2.3)	−27.4 (−17.3)	−27.4 (−17.3)
Average precipitation mm (inches)	12.2 (0.48)	14.6 (0.57)	30.6 (1.20)	26.9 (1.06)	44.5 (1.75)	72.0 (2.83)	159.9 (6.30)	155.5 (6.12)	80.1 (3.15)	32.8 (1.29)	8.7 (0.34)	3.5 (0.14)	641.3 (25.23)
Average precipitation days (≥ 0.1 mm)	5.4	5.9	9.8	10.0	11.9	15.5	22.3	23.0	17.8	9.7	2.7	1.7	135.7
Average snowy days	9.4	11.4	13.2	4.1	0.3	0	0	0	0.2	0.6	4.0	4.8	48
Average relative humidity (%)	57	59	62	64	66	70	78	79	77	70	61	55	67
Mean monthly sunshine hours	239.3	208.6	202.1	184.7	189.9	150.3	108.1	120.3	127.7	189.7	228.3	253.7	2,202.7
Percentage possible sunshine	73	65	54	48	45	36	26	30	35	54	71	79	51
Source 1: China Meteorological Administration
Source 2: Weather China

== National park ==
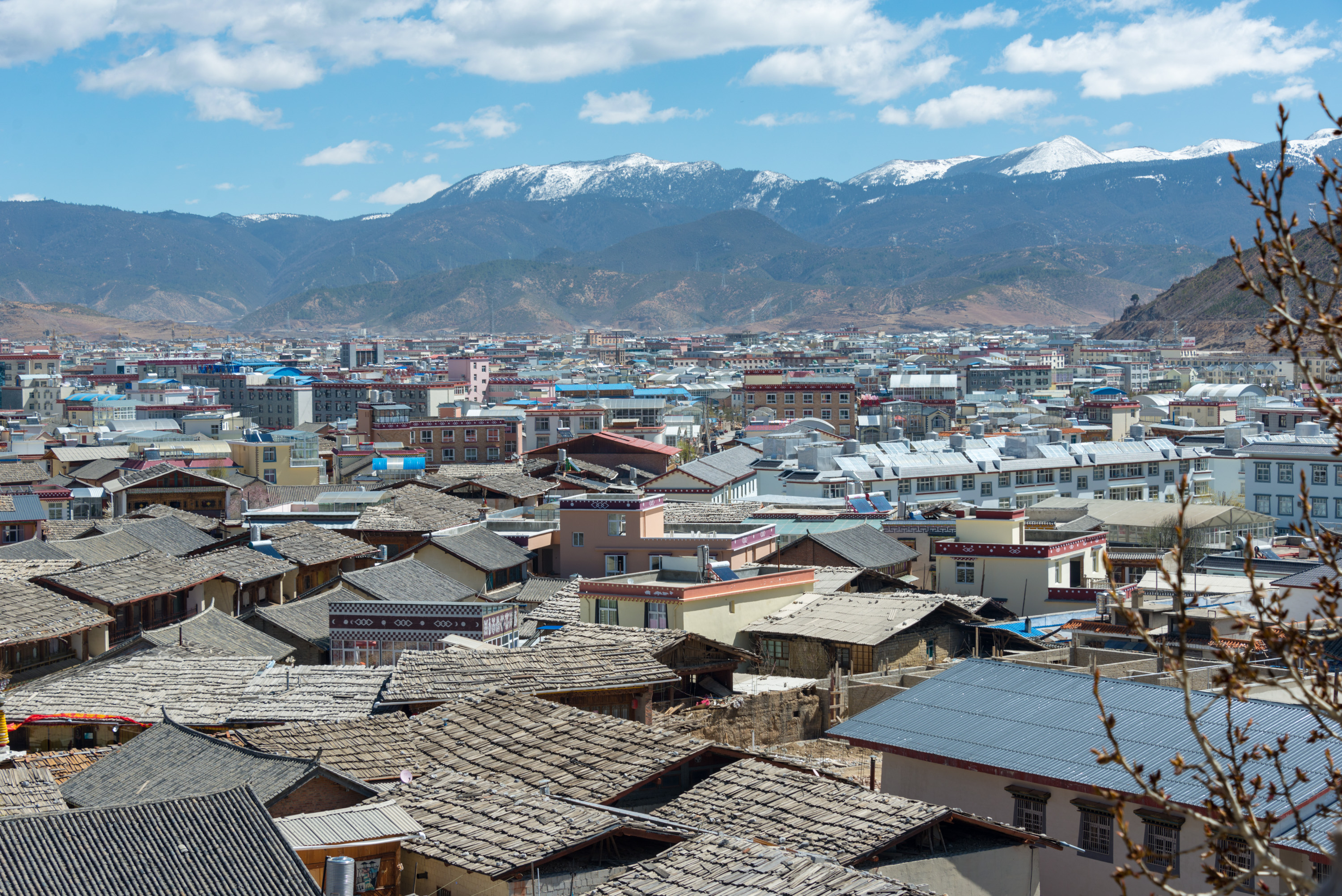
View of the old town of Shangri-La

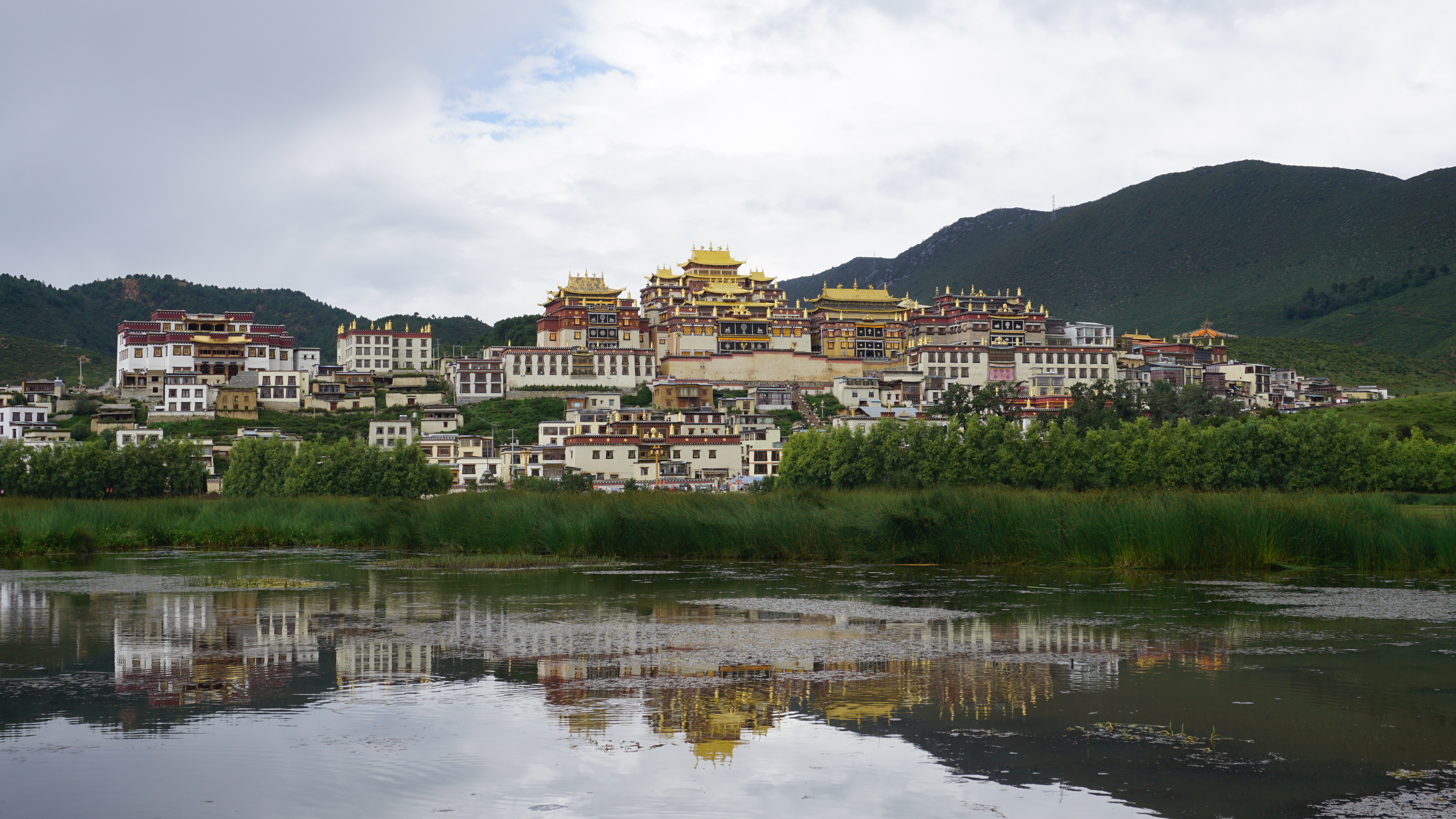
Gandan Sumtseling Monastery

- Pudacuo National Park, the first national park in China to meet IUCN standards, is part of the Three Parallel Rivers of Yunnan Protected Areas World Heritage Site.

== Transport ==
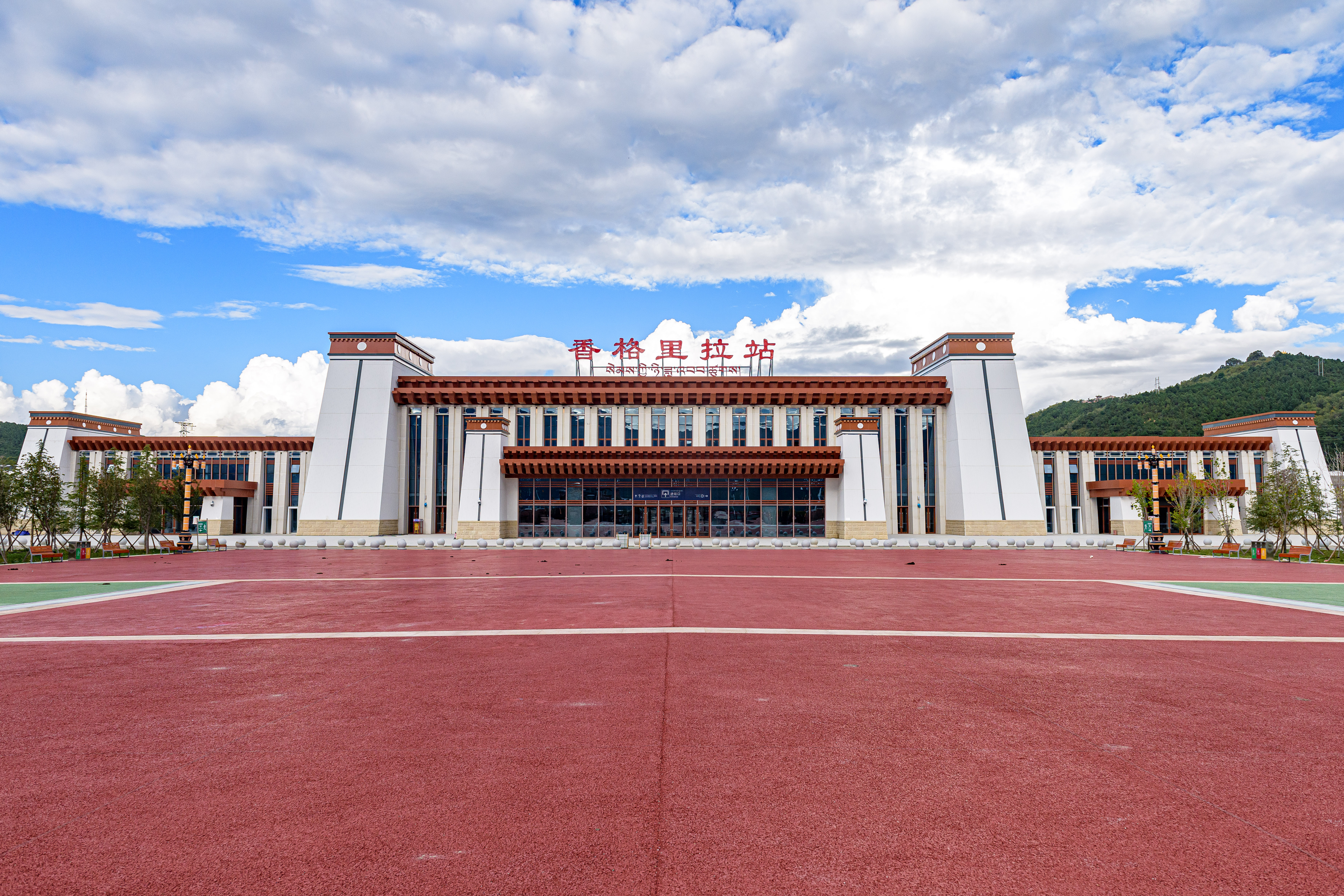
Shangri-La railway station before operation (September 2023)

- Shangri-La railway station on Lijiang–Shangri-La railway opened on 26 November 2023. It takes 1h 20min to reach Lijiang by train, and about 5h to the provincial capital Kunming.
- The city's airport is Diqing Shangri-La Airport. Covering an area of 225 hectares, it is one of the biggest airports in the northwest of Yunnan. There are flights to Kunming, Chengdu, Lhasa, Guangzhou and Shenzhen.
- Taking a long-distance bus is also a major means to get to Shangri-La. It takes about four hours to get to Shangri-La from Lijiang by bus. Tourists who rent a car for the trip can also visit the Tiger Leaping Gorge (Hutiaoxia, 虎跳峡) and the First Bend of Yangtze River on the way.
- Many travelers use the county town as a gateway into Tibet, either travelling many days overland by jeep to Lhasa, or by flying from the city's airport. However, the town itself is a tourist destination, primarily due to the nearby Gandan Sumtseling Monastery, Ganden Sumtsen Ling, 松赞林寺 Sōngzànlín Sì), Pudacuo National Park, and Tiger Leaping Gorge.
- China National Highway 214

== See also ==
- Shangri-La Beer
- Three Parallel Rivers of Yunnan Protected Areas – UNESCO World Heritage Site
