= Diqing Shangri-La Airport =

Diqing Shangri-La Airport 迪庆香格里拉机场
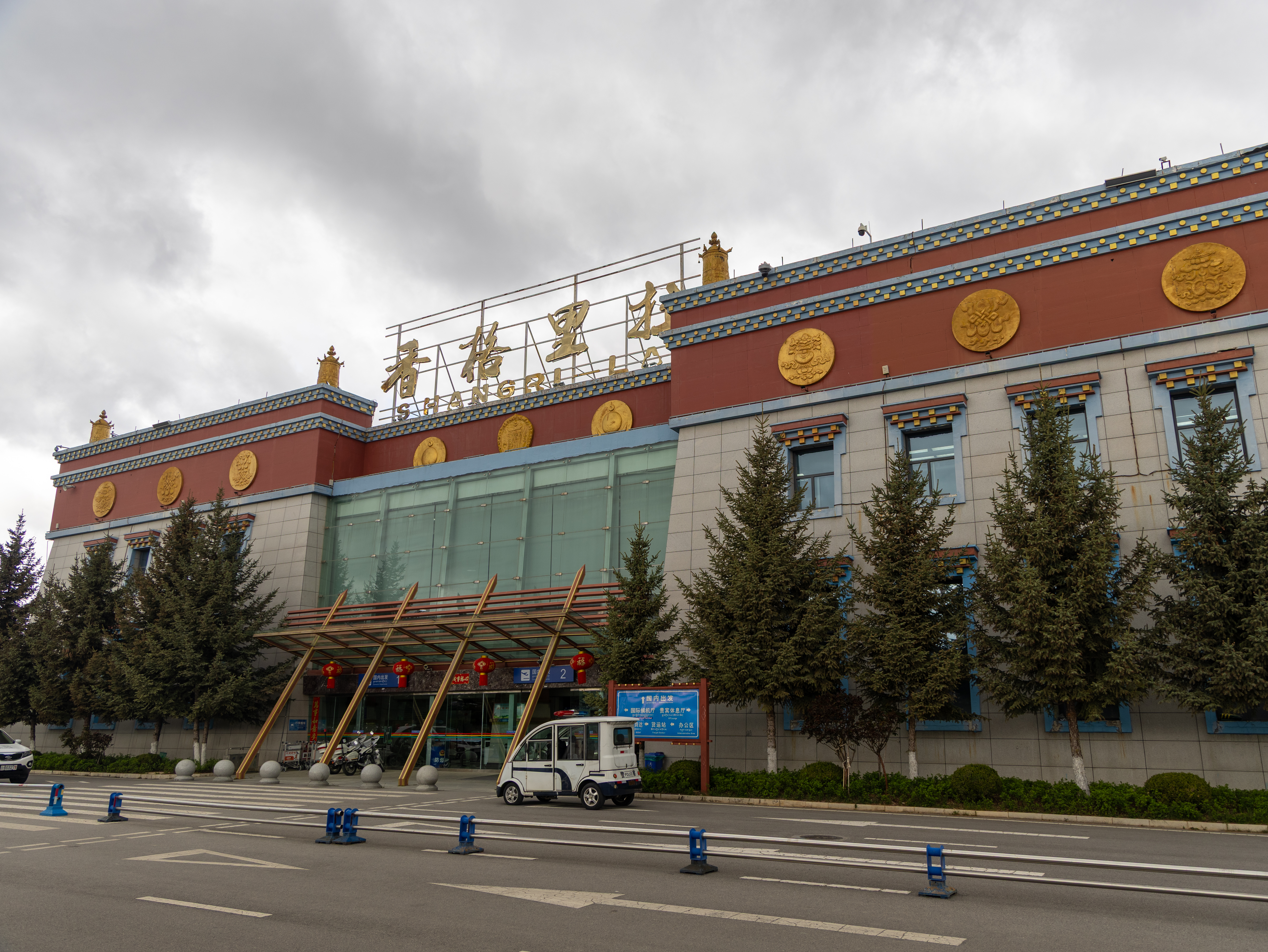
- Shangri-La Airport
- IATA: DIG; ICAO: ZPDQ

Summary
- Airport type: Public
- Operator: Yunnan Airport Group
- Location: Shangri-La, Yunnan, China
- Elevation AMSL: 3,280 m (10,760 ft)
- Coordinates: 27°47′36″N 99°40′38.4″E

Map
- Location of airport in Yunnan

Runways
Direction	Length		Surface
Direction	m	ft	Surface
16/34	3,600	11,647	Asphalt

Statistics (2025)
- Passengers: 428,318
- Aircraft movements: 4,836
- Cargo (metric tons): 1,608.6
- Source: Source: CAAC

Diqing Shangri-La Airport
- Simplified Chinese: 迪庆香格里拉机场
- Traditional Chinese: 廸慶香格里拉機場
Transcriptions
Standard Mandarin
- Hanyu Pinyin: Díqìng Xiānggélǐlā Jīchǎng

Diqing Shangri-La Airport (IATA: DIG, ICAO: ZPDQ) is an airport serving Shangri-La City, Dêqên Tibetan Autonomous Prefecture, Yunnan Province, China. The airport does not have any taxiways (other than the one leading to the terminal building), requiring planes landing there to backtaxi to the terminal building.

== History ==
Diqing Shangri-La Airport was formerly known as Diqing Zhongdian Airport. The airport is located in Lazanba, 5.4 km southwest of Shangri-La County, at an altitude of 3287.8 meters. It is a high-altitude branch airport in Yunnan.

Construction of the airport began on January 4, 1998. On April 30, 1999, a Yunnan Airlines Boeing 737-700 passenger plane landed at Diqing Zhongdian Airport, marking the airport's official operation.

On August 26, 2002, Diqing Zhongdian Airport was renamed Diqing Shangri-La Airport.

In June 2007, a groundbreaking ceremony was held for the 350 million yuan expansion project of Diqing Shangri-La Airport. On September 18, 2007, the airport expansion and renovation project officially commenced.

The main structure was completed on April 24, 2009, and passed civil aviation industry acceptance, with the project quality assessed as qualified. The newly built terminal building at Diqing Shangri-La Airport officially opened on June 16, 2009.

In 2017, the implementation plan for declaring and constructing the aviation port at Diqing Shangri‑La Airport received official approval.

On March 15, 2019, the Yunnan Provincial Development and Reform Commission approved the fourth phase of the expansion and renovation project of Diqing Shangri-La Airport. Construction began in June 2020, with a total investment of approximately 140 million yuan, including the asphalt concrete overlay of the runway and the upgrading of navigation lights, etc. On March 23, 2021, the project passed the group company's completion acceptance. On May 13, the project passed the industry acceptance.

== Airlines and destinations ==
Airlines	Destinations
China Eastern Airlines	Chengdu–Tianfu, Guangzhou, Kunming, Lhasa, Shanghai–Hongqiao
Chongqing Airlines	Beijing–Daxing, Chongqing
Lucky Air	Kunming
Sichuan Airlines	Chengdu–Tianfu

== See also ==
- List of airports in China
- List of highest airports
