= Diqing Tibetan Autonomous Prefecture =

Coordinates: 27.82°N 99.70°E

- Autonomous prefecture

Chinese transcription(s)
  - Simplified Chinese: 迪庆藏族自治州
  - Hanyu pinyin: Díqìng Zàngzú Zìzhìzhōu

Tibetan transcription(s)
  - Tibetan script: བདེ་ཆེན་བོད་རིགས་རང་སྐྱོང་ཁུལ་
  - Tibetan pinyin: Dêqên Pörig Ranggyong Kü
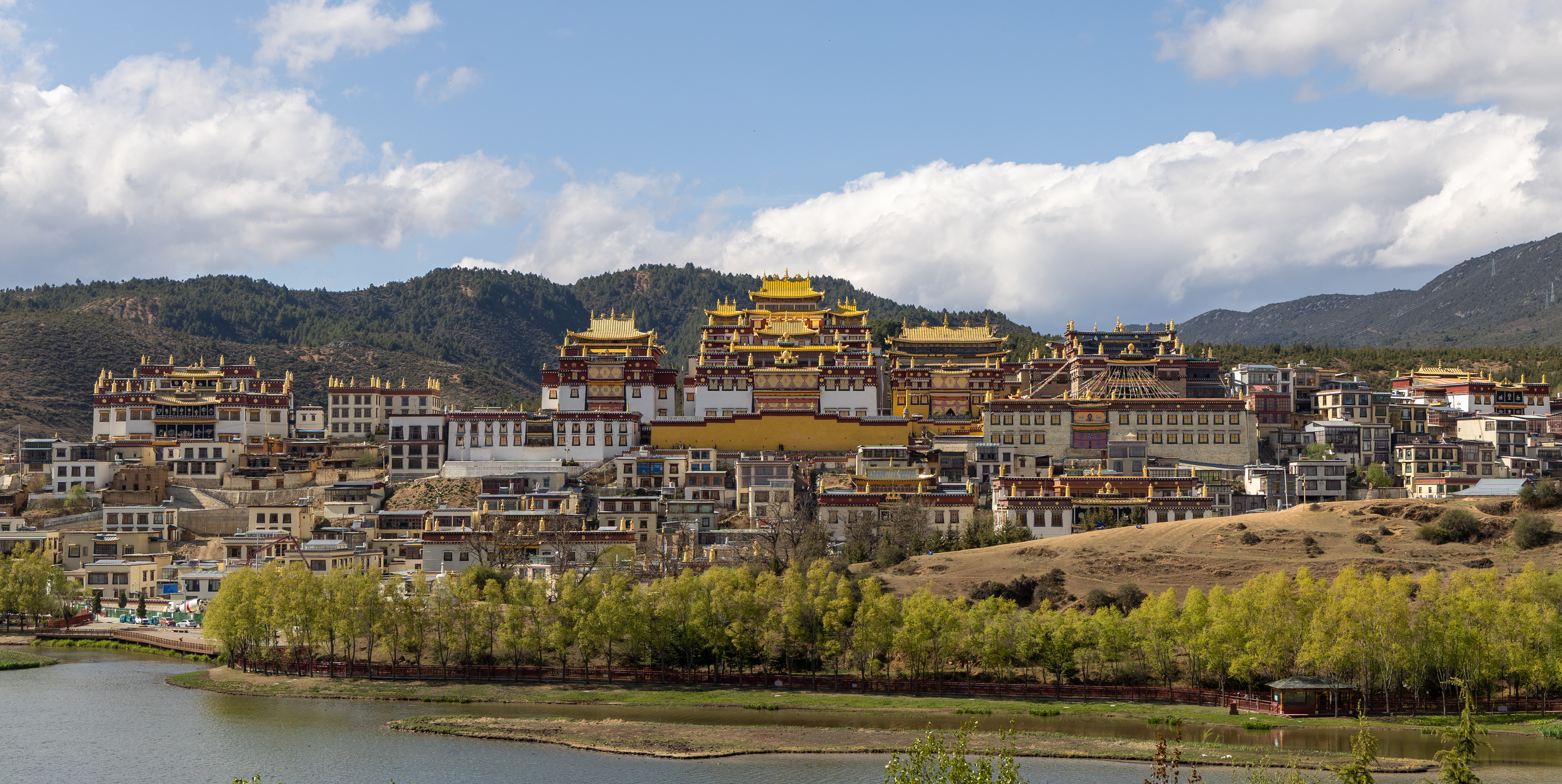
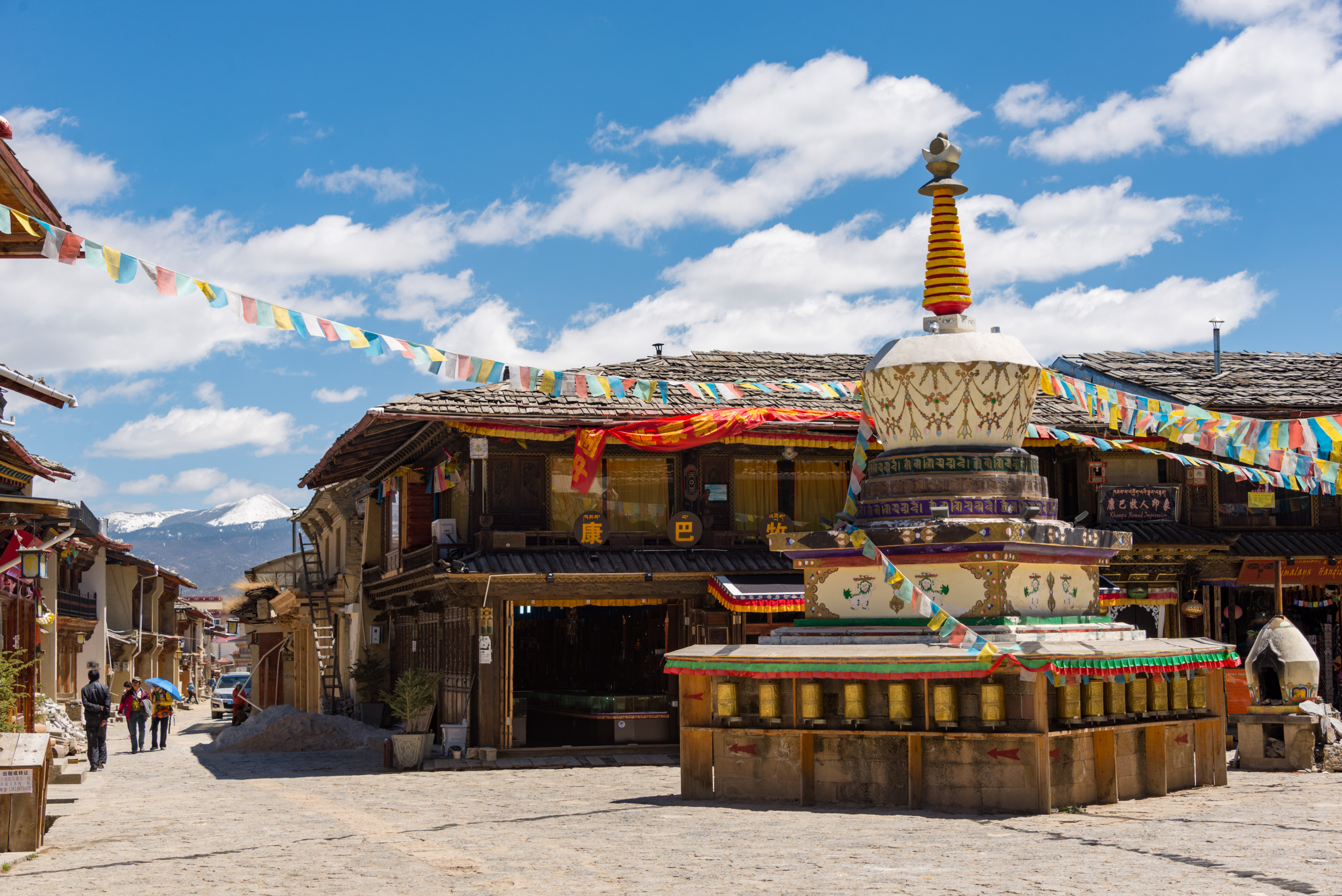
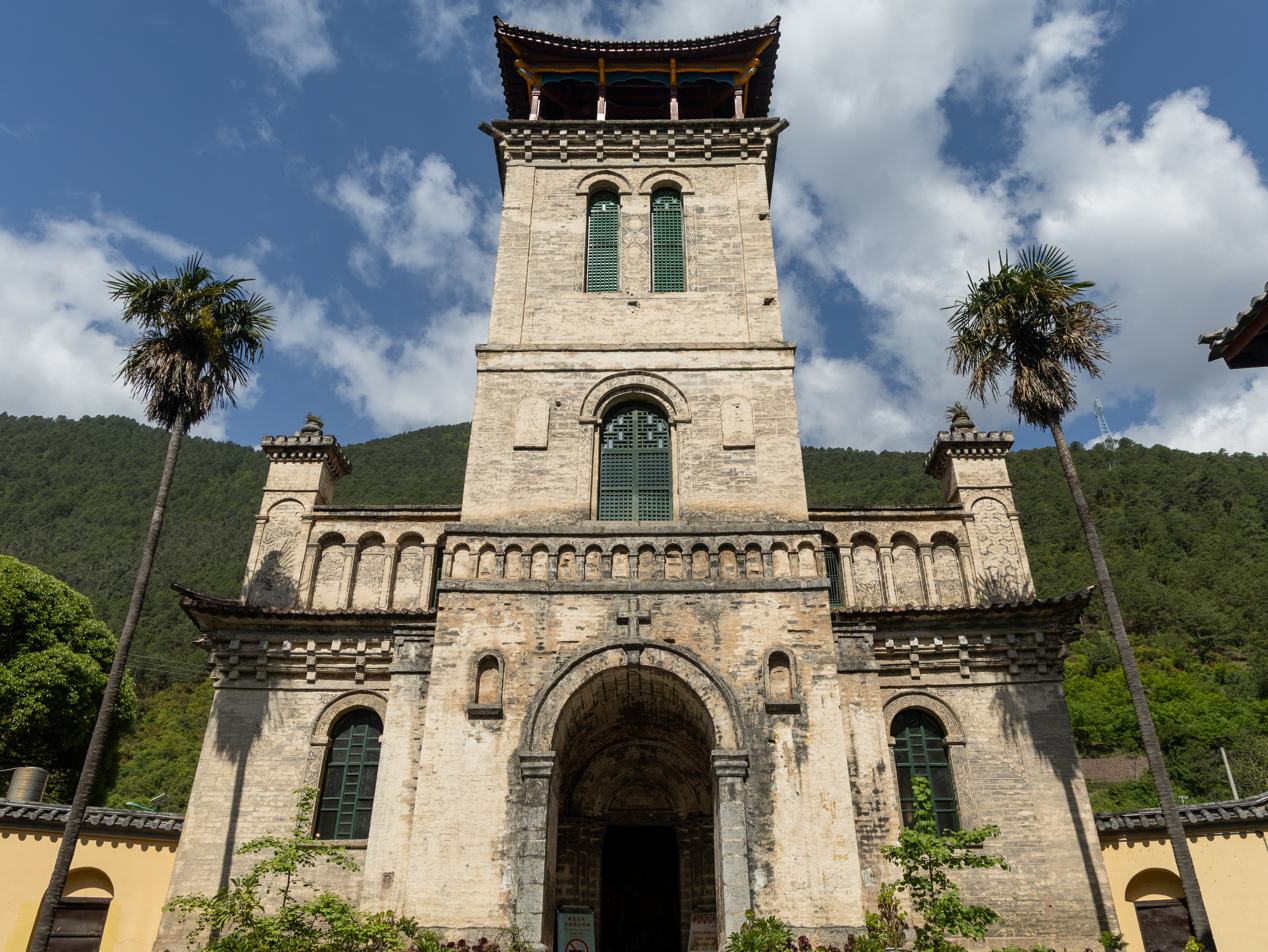
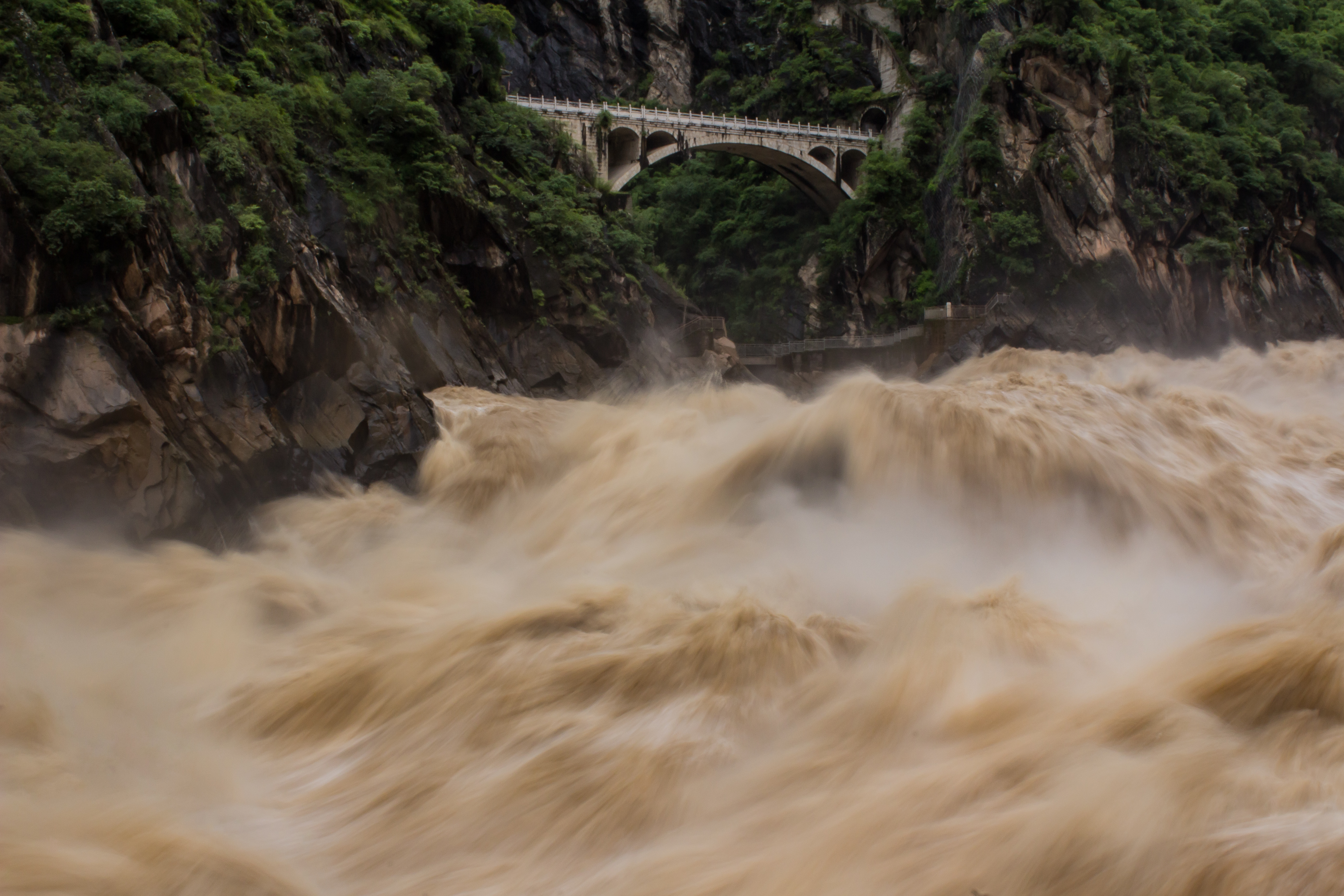
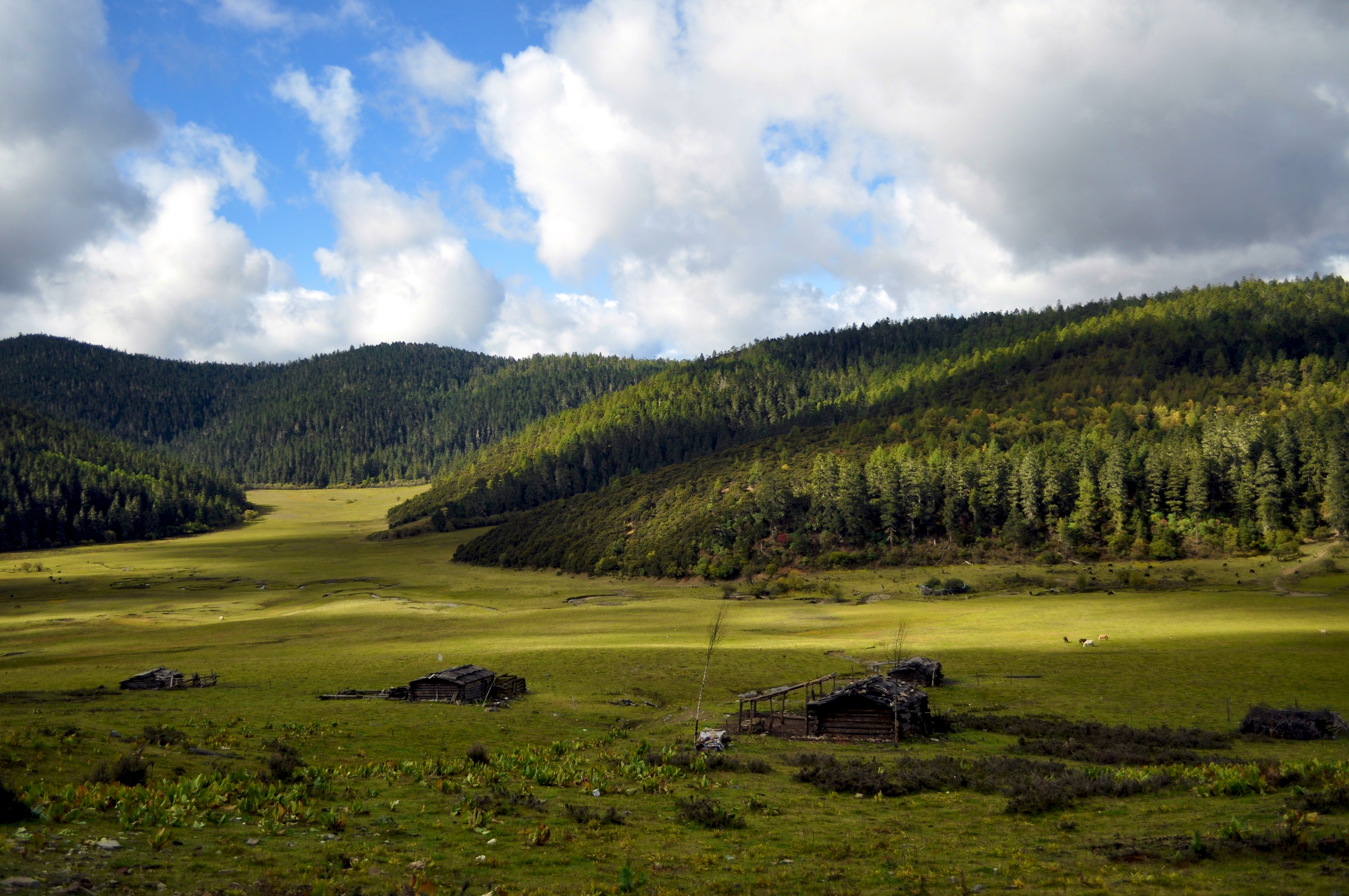
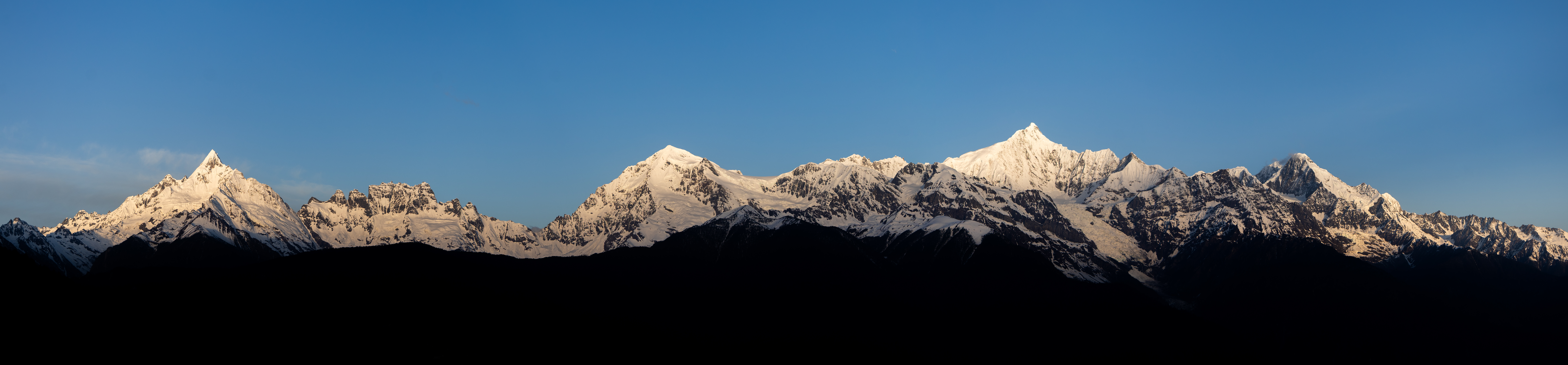
- Ganden Sumtseling Monastery Dukezong old town Tsedro Church Tiger Leaping Gorge Potatson National Park Meili Snow Mountains
- Etymology: From Tibetan བདེ་ཆེན (dêqên), meaning "auspicious place"
- Location of Diqing Prefecture in Yunnan
- Country: China
- Province: Yunnan
- Prefecture seat: Shangri-La

Government
  - Type: Autonomous prefecture
  - CCP Secretary: Gu Kun
  - Congress Chairman: Gu Kun
  - Governor: Qi Jianxin
  - CPPCC Chairman: Du Yongchun

Area
  - Total: 23,185.59 km^{2} (8,952.01 sq mi)

Population (2010)
  - Total: 400,182
  - Density: 17.2599/km^{2} (44.7031/sq mi)

GDP
  - Total: CN¥ 30.3 billion US$ 4.5 billion
  - Per capita: CN¥ 77,785; US$11,473
- Time zone: UTC+8 (CST)
- Postal code: 674400
- Area code: 0887
- ISO 3166 code: CN-YN-34
- License plate prefix: 云R
- Website: www.diqing.gov.cn

Diqing Tibetan Autonomous Prefecture

Chinese name
- Simplified Chinese: 迪庆藏族自治州
- Traditional Chinese: 迪慶藏族自治州
Transcriptions
Standard Mandarin
- Hanyu Pinyin: Díqìng Zàngzú Zìzhìzhōu

Tibetan name
- Tibetan: བདེ་ཆེན་བོད་རིགས་རང་སྐྱོང་ཁུལ་
Transcriptions
- Wylie: bde-chen bod-rigs rang-skyong khul
- Tibetan Pinyin: Dêqên Pörig Ranggyong Kü

Diqing Tibetan Autonomous Prefecture (Note: Chinese: 迪庆藏族自治州; pinyin: Díqìng Zàngzú Zìzhìzhōu; Tibetan: བདེ་ཆེན་བོད་རིགས་རང་སྐྱོང་ཁུལ་, ZWPY: Dêqên Pörig Ranggyong Kü) is an autonomous prefecture in northwestern Yunnan province, China. Covering an area of 23,870 km^{2} (9,220 sq mi), it is bordered by the Tibet Autonomous Region to the northwest, Sichuan province to the northeast, and other parts of Yunnan province to the southwest and southeast - Nujiang Lisu Autonomous Prefecture and Lijiang, respectively. Its capital and largest city is Shangri-La. At the end of 2024, the total resident population of the state was 395,000.

Diqing Prefecture is divided into three county-level divisions: Shangri-La, Deqin County, and Weixi Lisu Autonomous County. They were all formerly under the administration of Lijiang (located southeast of this prefecture). Diqing Prefecture was established in 1957 and named by its first governor.

== Etymology ==
The prefecture's name is derived from the Tibetan word བདེ་ཆེན (dêqên), which means "auspicious place". In Chinese, the name is written with the characters 迪 (dí) and 庆 (qìng), which mean "to enlighten" and "to celebrate", respectively. Alternate English names include Dechen and Deqing.

== Transport ==
=== Air ===
Diqing Shangri-La Airport, also known simply as Diqing Airport, is one of the biggest airports in the northwest of the Yunnan Province. It is located about 3.4 miles (5.5 km) from the center of Shangri-La City. There are flights to Lhasa, Chengdu, Beijing (via Kunming), Shanghai Pudong, Shenzhen (via Guiyang), Guangzhou, Kunming and Xishuangbanna.

=== Road ===
Highways are the main means of transportation to reach Diqing Prefecture. The major highway in this prefecture is China National Highway 214 (a Yunnan-Tibet-Qinghai highway abbreviated "G214").

There are also direct bus routes to Kunming, Lijiang and Panzhihua (Sichuan).

== Demography ==
Ethnic composition of Diqing Prefecture, 2020 census
Ethnicity	Population	Percentage
Tibetan	127,685	32.95%
Lisu	105,397	27.20%
Han	64,823	16.73%
Naxi	43,447	11.21%
Bai	21,208	5.47%
Yi	17,759	4.58%
Pumi	2,081	0.54%
Miao	1,641	0.42%
Hui	1,593	0.41%
Hani	251	0.06%
Others	1,626	0.42%
Total	387,511	

== Subdivisions ==
Diqing Prefecture is divided into three county-level divisions: Shangri-La, Deqin County, and Weixi Lisu Autonomous County.

Map
Name	Hanzi	Hanyu Pinyin	Tibetan	Tibetan Pinyin	Wylie	Population (2010 Census)	Area (km^{2})	Density (/km^{2})
Shangri-La	香格里拉市	Xiānggélǐlā Shì	སེམས་ཀྱི་ཉི་ཟླ་གྲོང་ཁྱེར།	Sêmgyi'nyida Chongkyir	sems kyi nyi zla grong khyer	172,988	11,613	14.89
Deqin County	德钦县	Déqīn Xiàn	བདེ་ཆེན་རྫོང་། མཇོལ་རྫོང་།	Dêqên Zong Jol Zong	bde chen rdzong mjol rdzong	66,589	7,596	8.76
Weixi Lisu Autonomous County	维西傈僳族 自治县	Wéixī Lìsùzú; Zìzhìxiàn	འབའ་ལུང་ལི་སུའུ་རིགས་རང་སྐྱོང་རྫོང་།	Balung Lisurig Ranggyong Zong	'ba' lung li su'u rigs rang skyong rdzong	160,605	4,661	34.45

== History ==
This prefecture is in the southern part of a historical region called Kham, which belonged to the Tibetan Empire many centuries ago. After the decline of that empire in the 9th century, peripheral areas like southern Kham remained part of Tibet more in an ethnographical than a political sense. As a practical matter, by the mid-1700s, the Tibetan Government had mostly lost control of Kham to Manchu (Qing) China and that situation lasted until the end of the Manchu Dynasty in 1912.

Southern Kham along with other parts of Yunnan were ruled by the Yunnan clique from 1915 until 1927. Then it was controlled by Governor and warlord Long (Lung) Yun until near the end of the Chinese Civil War, when Du Yuming removed him under the order of Chiang Kai-shek.

There are three county-level divisions in this prefecture: Shangri-La (formerly Zhongdian), Deqin County and Weixi Lisu Autonomous County (formerly Weixi) and they all were under the administration of Lijiang. The Autonomous Prefecture was established in 1957 and named "Diqing" by its first governor.

During the remainder of the 20th century, the prefecture's capital was called Zhongdian but was renamed on December 17, 2001 as Shangri-La City (other spellings: Semkyi'nyida, Xianggelila or Xamgyi'nyilha) after the fictional land of Shangri-La in the 1933 James Hilton novel Lost Horizon, with an eye toward promoting tourism in the area.

On June 25, 2007 the Pudacuo National Park was established on 500 square miles (1,300 km^{2}) in this prefecture. On January 11, 2014, there was a major fire in the 1,000-year-old Dukezong Tibetan neighborhood of the capital city Shangri-La, causing much damage.
