= Xiannü =

Xiannü (Chinese: 仙女; lit. 'fairy maiden') may refer to:

== Chinese mythology ==
- Seven Fairies (China)
- Zhinü

== Others ==
- Xiannü, Hubei, town in Zhijiang, Hubei, China
- Xiannü, Jiangsu, town in Yangzhou, Jiangsu, China
- Shin Shin (giant panda) (born 2005), Chinese name Xiannü, giant panda in Tokyo's Ueno Zoo

== See also ==
- Xian (Taoism)
- He Xiangu from Chinese mythology
