= Xiannü, Hubei =

Xianju 仙居县 Sienku
- County
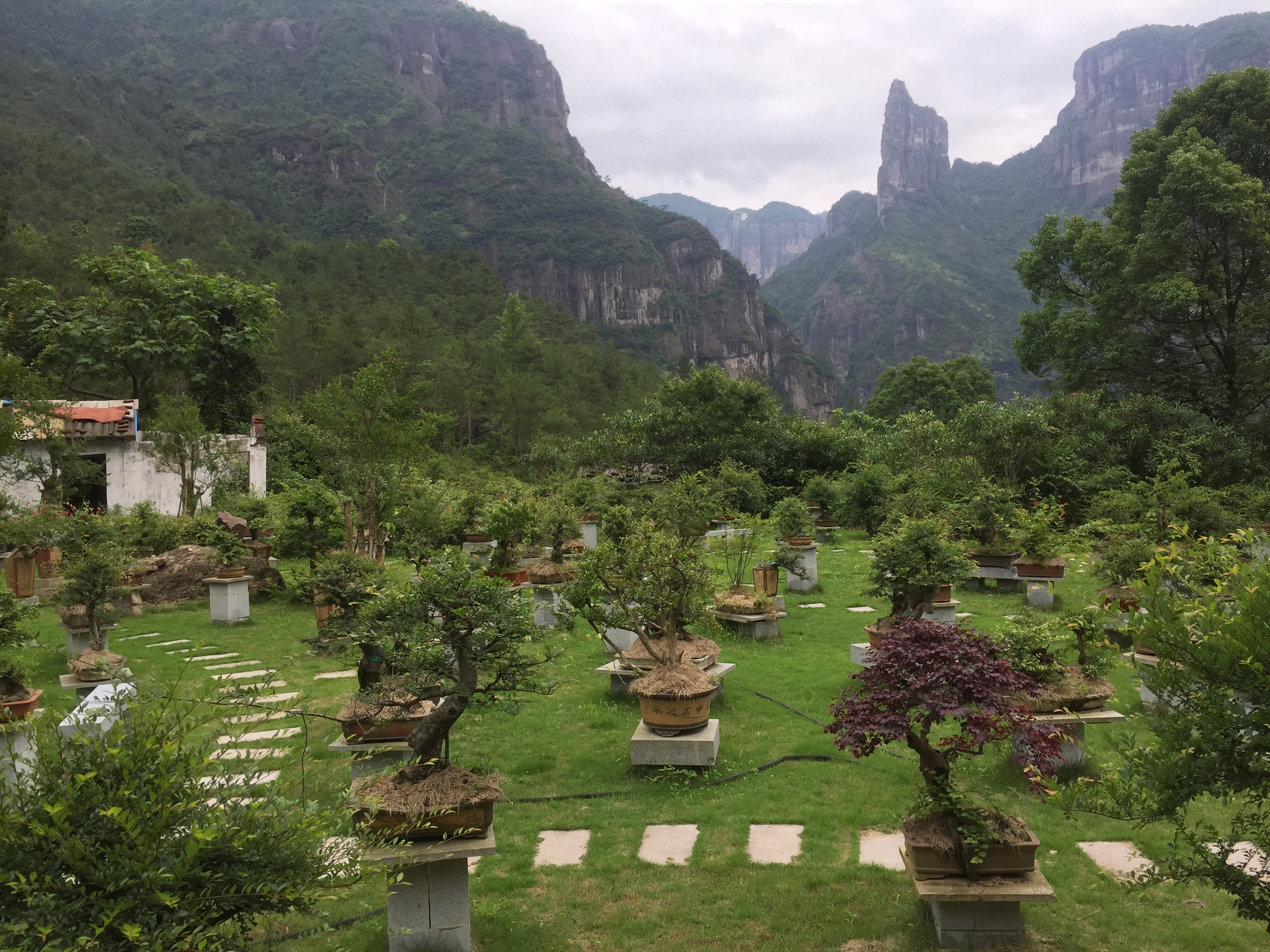
- Bonsai garden just outside the Shenxianju geologic area.

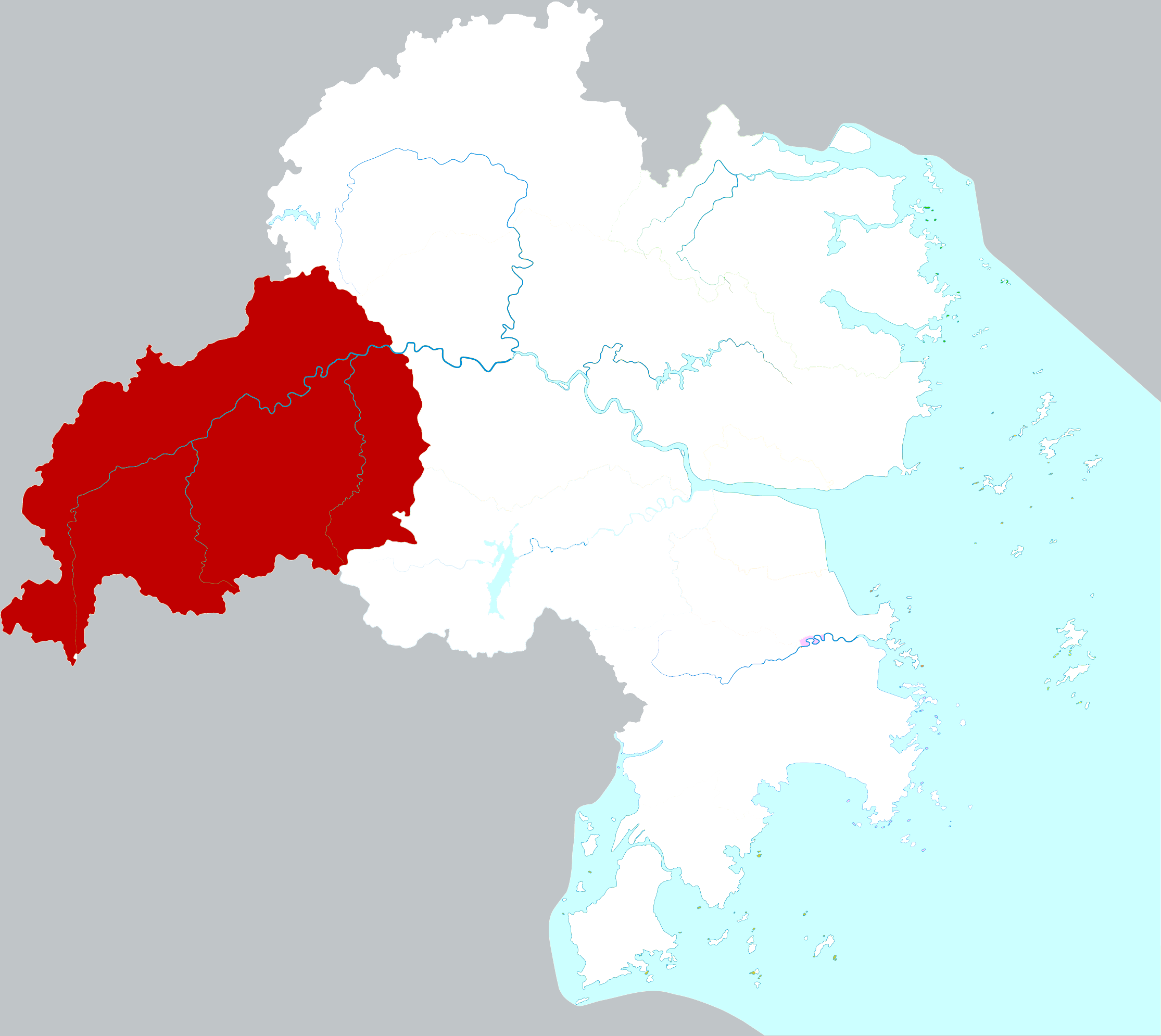
- Location of Xianju County within Taizhou

- Location of the seat in Zhejiang
- Coordinates: 28.8539°N 120.731°E
- Country: People's Republic of China
- Province: Zhejiang
- Prefecture-level city: Taizhou
- Named for: In Chinese, xian means "celestial spirit," and ju means "dwelling place." Xianju was named "dwelling place of celestial spirits" due to its natural beauty.

Area
  - Total: 2,000.11 km^{2} (772.25 sq mi)

Population (2020)
  - Total: 431,800
- Time zone: UTC+8 (China Standard)
- Website: http://www.zjxj.gov.cn/InfoPub/Default.aspx http://www.zjxj.gov.cn/InfoPub/ZWPD_XJLY.aspx

Xianju County (Chinese: 仙居县; pinyin: Xiānjū Xiàn; Tai-chow dialect: Sin-kü Yön) is a county of Zhejiang, China. It is under the administration of the Taizhou city. It is the location of Shenxianju, a geological site protected by the Chinese government. Xianju is an economically underdeveloped county, relying somewhat on tourism. On October 15, Shenxianju scenic spot became a national 5A level scenic spot.

== Administrative divisions ==
Subdistricts:

- Fuying Subdistrict (福应街道), Nanfeng Subdistrict (南峰街道), Anzhou Subdistrict (安洲街道)

Towns:

- Hengxi (横溪镇), Baita (白塔镇), Tianshi (田市镇), Guanlu (官路镇), Xiage (下各镇), Zhuxi (朱溪镇), Butou (埠头镇)

Townships:

- Anling Township (安岭乡), Xigang Township (溪港乡), Qiushan Township (湫山乡), Potan Township (皤滩乡), Tanzhu Township (淡竹乡), Bulu Township (步路乡), Shangzhang Township (上张乡), Guangdu Township (广度乡), Dazhan Township (大战乡), Shuangmiao Township (双庙乡)

== Climate ==
Climate data for Xianju, elevation 83 m (272 ft), (1991–2020 normals, extremes 1981–2010)
Month	Jan	Feb	Mar	Apr	May	Jun	Jul	Aug	Sep	Oct	Nov	Dec	Year
Record high °C (°F)	25.4 (77.7)	31.0 (87.8)	34.7 (94.5)	36.2 (97.2)	39.2 (102.6)	39.0 (102.2)	41.8 (107.2)	40.7 (105.3)	39.7 (103.5)	35.6 (96.1)	32.2 (90.0)	27.5 (81.5)	41.8 (107.2)
Mean daily maximum °C (°F)	11.4 (52.5)	13.9 (57.0)	17.6 (63.7)	23.5 (74.3)	27.6 (81.7)	30.1 (86.2)	34.7 (94.5)	33.8 (92.8)	29.7 (85.5)	25.2 (77.4)	19.7 (67.5)	14.0 (57.2)	23.4 (74.2)
Daily mean °C (°F)	6.6 (43.9)	8.5 (47.3)	12.1 (53.8)	17.5 (63.5)	22.1 (71.8)	25.2 (77.4)	28.9 (84.0)	28.3 (82.9)	24.7 (76.5)	19.7 (67.5)	14.4 (57.9)	8.6 (47.5)	18.1 (64.5)
Mean daily minimum °C (°F)	3.1 (37.6)	4.6 (40.3)	8.0 (46.4)	13.0 (55.4)	17.8 (64.0)	21.7 (71.1)	24.7 (76.5)	24.5 (76.1)	21.0 (69.8)	15.4 (59.7)	10.3 (50.5)	4.6 (40.3)	14.1 (57.3)
Record low °C (°F)	−7.1 (19.2)	−6.1 (21.0)	−5.1 (22.8)	0.8 (33.4)	8.3 (46.9)	11.9 (53.4)	16.9 (62.4)	18.4 (65.1)	11.2 (52.2)	2.4 (36.3)	−3.7 (25.3)	−7.9 (17.8)	−7.9 (17.8)
Average precipitation mm (inches)	67.1 (2.64)	67.7 (2.67)	131.1 (5.16)	118.6 (4.67)	152.9 (6.02)	259.3 (10.21)	163.2 (6.43)	226.6 (8.92)	139.7 (5.50)	58.4 (2.30)	61.6 (2.43)	54.2 (2.13)	1,500.4 (59.08)
Average precipitation days (≥ 0.1 mm)	12.4	12.4	16.7	15.1	15.8	18.5	13.6	16.4	12.2	7.0	9.4	9.2	158.7
Average snowy days	2.3	1.8	0.4	0	0	0	0	0	0	0	0	0.7	5.2
Average relative humidity (%)	74	73	74	72	74	80	75	77	77	73	75	73	75
Mean monthly sunshine hours	98.4	99.7	113.1	132.3	140.0	120.1	215.7	194.9	149.0	156.2	116.5	122.2	1,658.1
Percentage possible sunshine	30	32	30	34	33	29	51	48	41	44	37	38	37
Source: China Meteorological Administrationall-time extreme temperature

== Tourist attractions ==
Xianju National Park is a national park and famous scenic spot in the county.

== Transportation ==
Xianju is intersected by Zhuyong Expressway (S26; Zhuji – Yongjia) and Taijin Expressway (S28; Taizhou – Jinhua). Xianju South railway station is on the Jinhua–Taizhou railway. It is accessible by bus from all major cities in Zhejiang province.

== See also ==
- The Taizhou Museum displays a three-dimensional model of the residentials of the ancient town, Potan, Xianju.
- Xianju Library
