= List of raw materials used in button-making =

Please see external links for images of buttons (front & back) made from the material(s) in question. ("NBS name" refers to labelling used by the National Button Society, USA.)

== Natural materials ==
=== Animal-derived ===
- bone
- horn
- horsehair
- ivory
- leather
- pearl
- shell ^{(Images of buttons made from all the shell types listed below)}

seashells:

- abalone
- conch
- cowry
- helmut
- mother of pearl
- mussels
- nautilus
- operculum
- oyster
- pearl oyster
- pinna
- trochus
- turbo snail

land shells:
- emerald green snail shell

=== plant-derived ===
- coconut shell
- bamboo
- gourd
- gutta percha
- Tagua Nut
- natural, woven fabrics and/or textiles
- linoleum
- paper (e.g. papier mache)
- rubber
- vegetable ivory
- wood

=== Rocks and minerals (or predominantly mineral-derived substances) ===
- bauxite
- catlinite
- cinnabar
- coal
- enamel
- glass
- gypsum (a.k.a. plaster of Paris)
- marcasite
- metals:

aluminium
brass
pot metal
sterling silver
steel

- whiteware ceramics:

earthenware
- china

== Synthetic materials ==
=== plastics ===
- acrylic resin
- bakelite
- catalin (NBS name: phenolic or bakelite type)
- celluloid
- galalith, a.k.a. casein (NBS name: casein)
- lucite
- melamine formaldehyde (NBS name: amino resin)
- phenolic resin (NBS name: phenolic or bakelite type)
- urea-formaldehyde (NBS name: amino resin)

=== synthetic fibres ===
- synthetic textiles

== See also ==
- Button collecting
- History of technology
- Seashells in personal adornment

== Bibliography ==
- Luscomb, Sally C. (2003). The Collector's Encyclopedia of Buttons. Atglen, PA: Schiffer. p. 242. ISBN 0-7643-1815-2. LCCN 2003101645.
- Osborne, Peggy A. (1997). Button, button : identification and price guide. Atglen, PA: Schiffer. p. 167. ISBN 0-7643-0082-2. LCCN 92063104.
- Peacock, Primrose (1978). Discovering old buttons. Discovering series; no. 213. Rosemary Godsell (illus.). Aylesbury, UK: Shire Publications. pp. 76. ISBN 0-85263-445-5.
- Wisniewski, Debra J. (1997). Antique & collectible buttons : identification & values. Charley Lynch. Paducah, KY: Collector Books. p. 168. ISBN 0-89145-711-9. LCCN 97122120.
