= Xiage =

Xiage may refer to the following locations in China:

- Xiage, Chaohu (夏阁镇), town in Anhui
- Xiage, Zhao'an County (霞葛镇), town in Zhao'an County, Fujian
- Xiage, Xianju County (下各镇), town in Xianju County, Zhejiang
