= Lishui River Bridge (Yongjia County) =

Lishui River Bridge 丽水桥
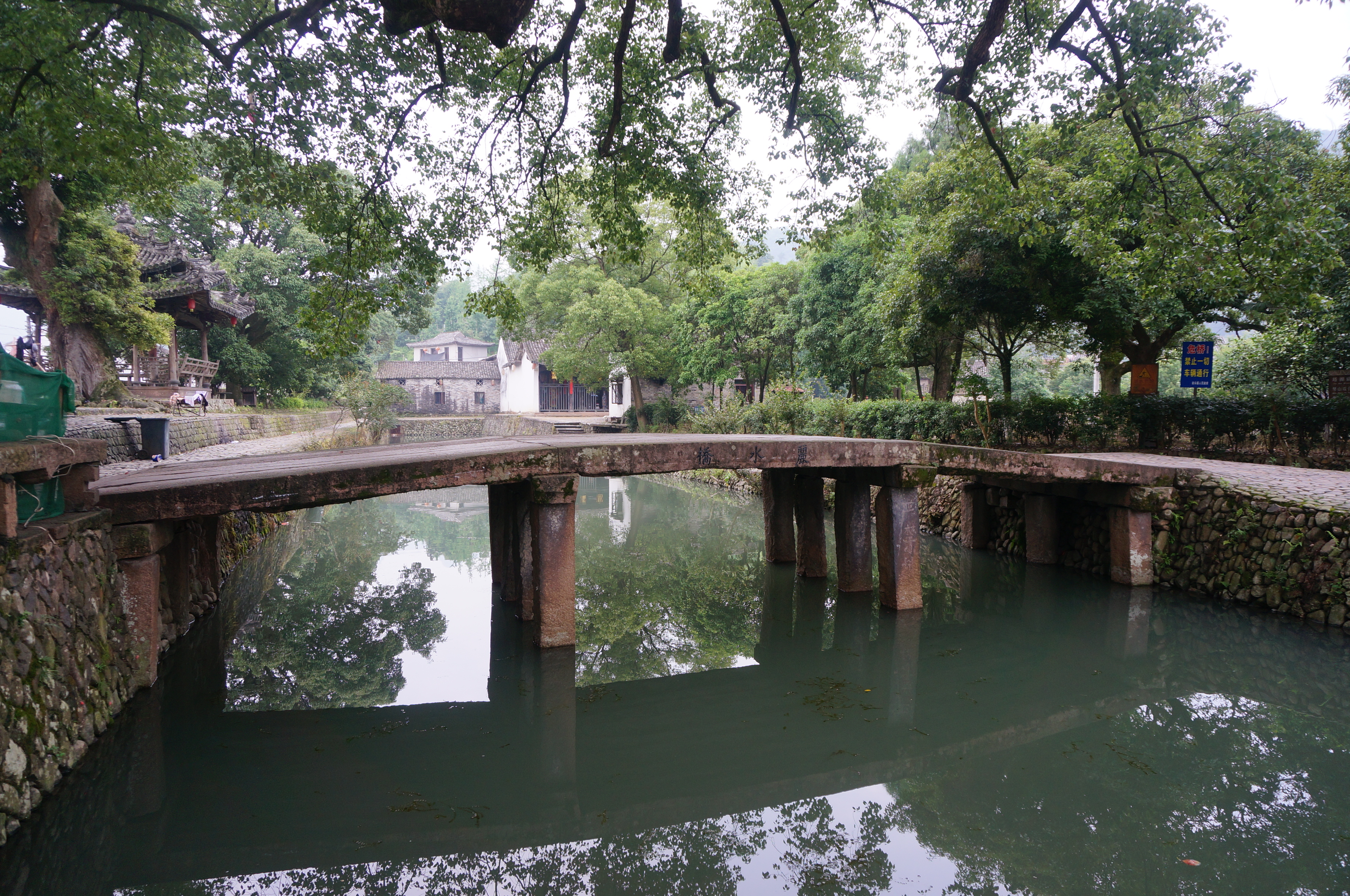
- Lishui River Bridge in June 2016
- Coordinates: 28°20′32″N 120°44′27″E
- Carries: Pedestrians
- Crosses: Lishui River
- Locale: Yantou, Yongjia County, Zhejiang, China

Characteristics
- Design: Bridge
- Material: Stone
- Total length: 12 metres (39 ft)
- Width: 3.8 metres (12 ft)
- Longest span: 4 metres (13 ft)

History
- Construction end: 1558

Location
- Interactive map of Lishui River Bridge

The Lishui River Bridge (simplified Chinese: 丽水桥; traditional Chinese: 麗水橋; pinyin: Lìshuǐ Qiáo) is a historic stone bridge over the Lishui River in the town of Yantou, Yongjia County, Zhejiang, China.

== History ==
Lishui River Bridge was built in 1558 during the reign of the Jiajing Emperor of the Ming dynasty (1368–1644).

In August 1997, it was classified as a provincial-level cultural heritage site by the Government of Zhejiang.
