= Koumpounophobia =

Medical condition

- Specialty: Psychiatry

Koumpounophobia (from Modern Greek κουμπώνω (koumpóno), meaning "to button", and Ancient Greek φόβος (phóbos), meaning "fear") is the term used to describe the phobia of clothes' buttons. This phobia regularly leads to feelings of fear and disgust when sufferers are exposed to buttons either visually or physically. It is estimated that less than one percent of the U.S. has this phobia.

== Notable koumpounophobes ==
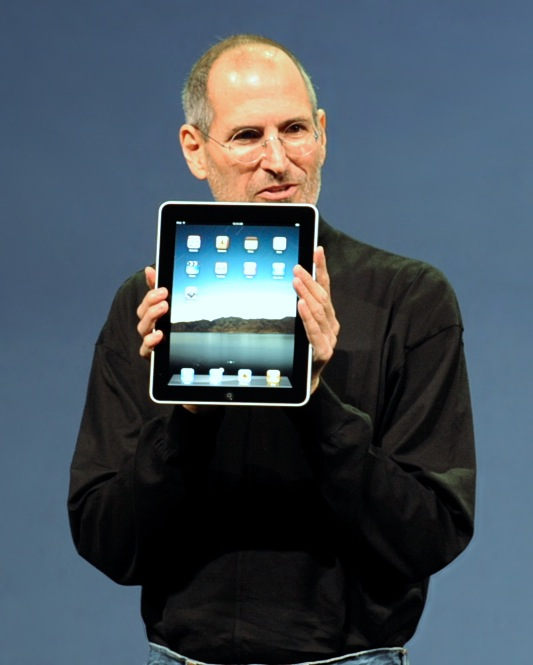
Steve Jobs, wearing a shirt with no buttons, holds up an iPad, which is a touchscreen tablet.

Steve Jobs, the co-founder of Apple Inc., had an aversion to buttons, which manifested in a dislike for buttons on computer hardware and his choice to wear turtleneck shirts instead of shirts with buttons. Some have speculated that this influenced the trend towards touchscreens and virtual keyboards in the design of Apple devices.

== Koumpounophobia in popular culture ==
In 2009, popular author Neil Gaiman released a promotional teaser trailer for the film Coraline, based on his novella. The trailer featured Gaiman addressing the nature of koumpounophobia and warning sufferers about the content of the film, which features characters with buttons in place of eyes.
