= Button collecting =

Hobby

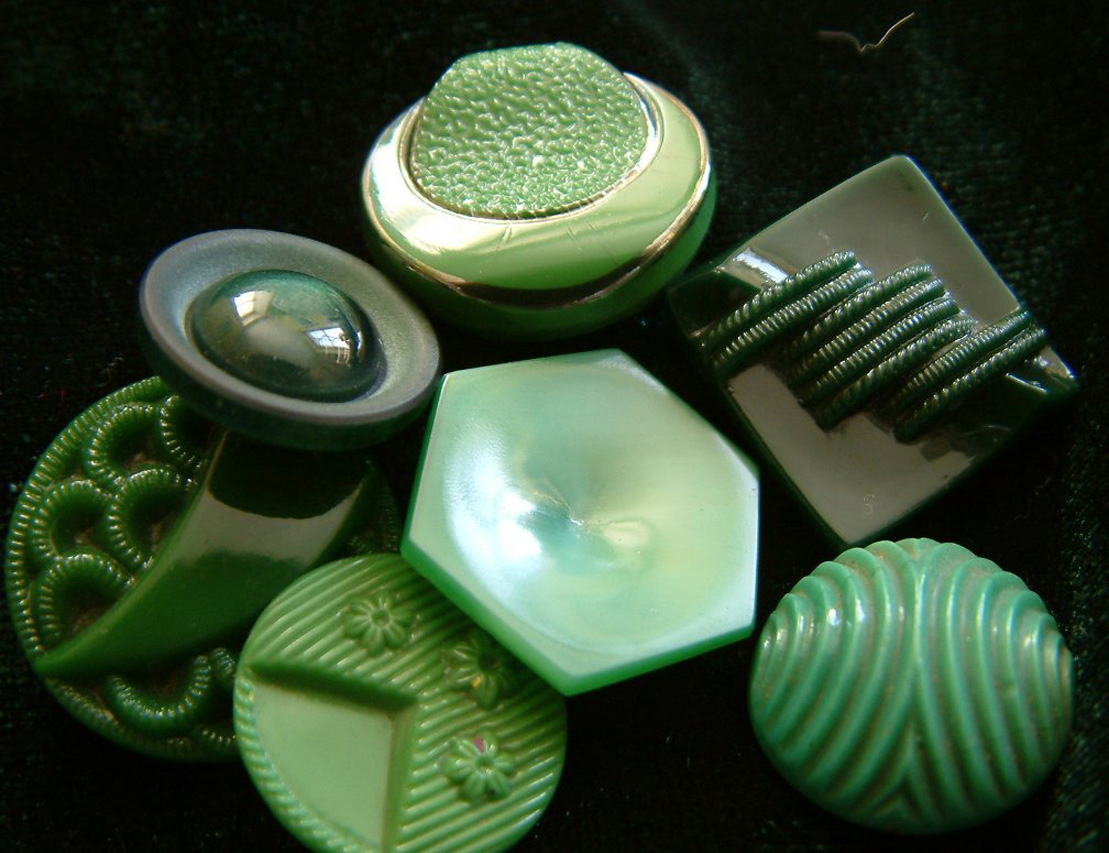
Green vintage buttons

Button collecting is the collecting of various types of clothing buttons.

Button collecting varies widely. In its most informal manifestation, a button collection may simply be the household button container, where buttons are stored for future use on clothing or for crafts. At the other end of the spectrum is the competitive collector, mainly found in the United States.

== History of button collecting ==
An early collection of military buttons was assiduously gathered by Luis Fenollosa Emilio in the United States. He began this collection around 1890, and donated it in 1908 to the Essex Institute in Salem, MA (now the Peabody Essex Museum). During the Belle Époque in Western Europe, there was an interest in collecting small antiques, which included buttons. Notable button collections were created in this period. A serious collector from this period was M. H. R. D’Allemagne of Paris. He documented key items from his collection in his three-volume Les Accessoires du Costume et du Mobilier (1928). After his death, his collection was purchased by an American collector and made its way to the United States. In the late 1800s, young women in England would accumulate glass buttons on a string, and it is said that when there were 1,000, she was ready for a suitor.

Button collecting became more organized in the late 1930s in America. The first known serious button collector in the US was Gertrude Patterson, who spoke about her collection on Dave Elman's Hobby Lobby radio interview show in 1938. This show featured one hobby per weekly episode. Even earlier, Otto C. Lightner started Hobbies magazine in the 1920s, and in 1938 sponsored a hobby show in Chicago, in which button collectors were involved. Factors like these led to a surge in others collecting in a focused way. There were large quantities of buttons available at that time, enabling this trend. The inexpensive nature of buttons made them affordable, even during the Great Depression. Lillian Smith Albert was one collector who documented her collecting efforts in her first and second volumes of A Button Collector's Journal (1941).

This new area of collecting required not just accumulating buttons, but also researching them. In order to further button collecting and research, the National Button Society was formed in 1938. The society has developed a classification system for buttons used for competition, but also useful for collecting. Collectors began to gather at shows for educational programs and to have access to the many buttons for sale. The first NBS show was held in Chicago in 1939, followed in the 1940s by shows put on by newly formed state and regional clubs. These shows continue through to the present.

Books began to be published on the topic, and a magazine was started in 1944 and continued to 1979, Just Buttons, edited by Sally Luscomb. Button Lines: The Journal of the British Button Society began publication in 1976, just before Just Buttons ceased publication. The National Button Bulletin, the publication of the National Button Society, began publication in 1942. These periodicals provided an opportunity for an expanding number of collectors to share their research in a manageable way. In the July 1942 issue of The National Button Society Quarterly Bulletin, Mrs. Peter Pastor wrote:

The most satisfying phase of button collecting, however, will be the study which each button affords as to material or identification of subject or design. It entails the perusing of volume after volume of history and art and costuming; dating a button by shank or material; researching for characteristics of buttons of various countries; and reading about the styles that created these various types of buttons.

In 1964, Diana Epstein and Millicent Safro turned an old New York City button shop into the store Tender Buttons, which would move downtown to East 62nd street in 1964. The button shop was named after Gertrude Stein's book Tender Buttons which she wrote in 1914.

== Buttons in museums and galleries ==
Some museums and art galleries hold culturally, historically, politically, and/or artistically significant buttons in their collections. London'ts Victoria & Albert Museum has many buttons, particularly in its jewellery collection, as does the Smithsonian Institution in Washington, DC. The Cooper-Hewitt National Museum of Design in New York, a division of the Smithsonian, has many buttons from the Renaissance forward. The Strong Museum in Rochester, NY also has a large button collection. The Corning Museum of Glass in Corning, NY has many buttons that are viewable on their website, and also numerous button-related items in their library. A specialized button museum is the National Pearl Button Museum in Muscatine, Iowa, the "Pearl Button Capital of the World" in the early 1900s. A button museum within a museum is the Waterbury Button Museum in the Mattatuck Museum in Waterbury, CT. Buttons have been manufactured in Waterbury for over 200 years, first by hand, then by machine. The Keep Homestead Museum in Monson, MA has "one of the largest collections of antique and vintage buttons on display in the U.S," with an online archive of a number of their buttons. The Birmingham Museums and Art Gallery in Birmingham UK holds the James Luckcock collection. The collection consists of over 500 buttons dating between 1770 and 1830.

== Collecting specialties ==
Collectors have many possibilities for specializing in the buttons they collect. They might decide to focus on buttons made of a particular material, buttons from a particular time frame, or buttons featuring a particular subject. Those who are interested in exhibiting their buttons competitively in regional or national shows in the United States follow the classification system contained in the National Button Society's Blue Book: Official Classification Competition Guidelines.

Buttons exist in a myriad of materials, including fabric and cloth, metal, glass, ceramic, enamel, natural materials such as wood, bone, or shell, a number of types of plastic, and more.

Collectors of buttons by time frame might collect them from a particular century, 18th or 19th, for example, or may be more specialized still, such as acquiring those buttons manufactured during the reign of Queen Victoria of England.

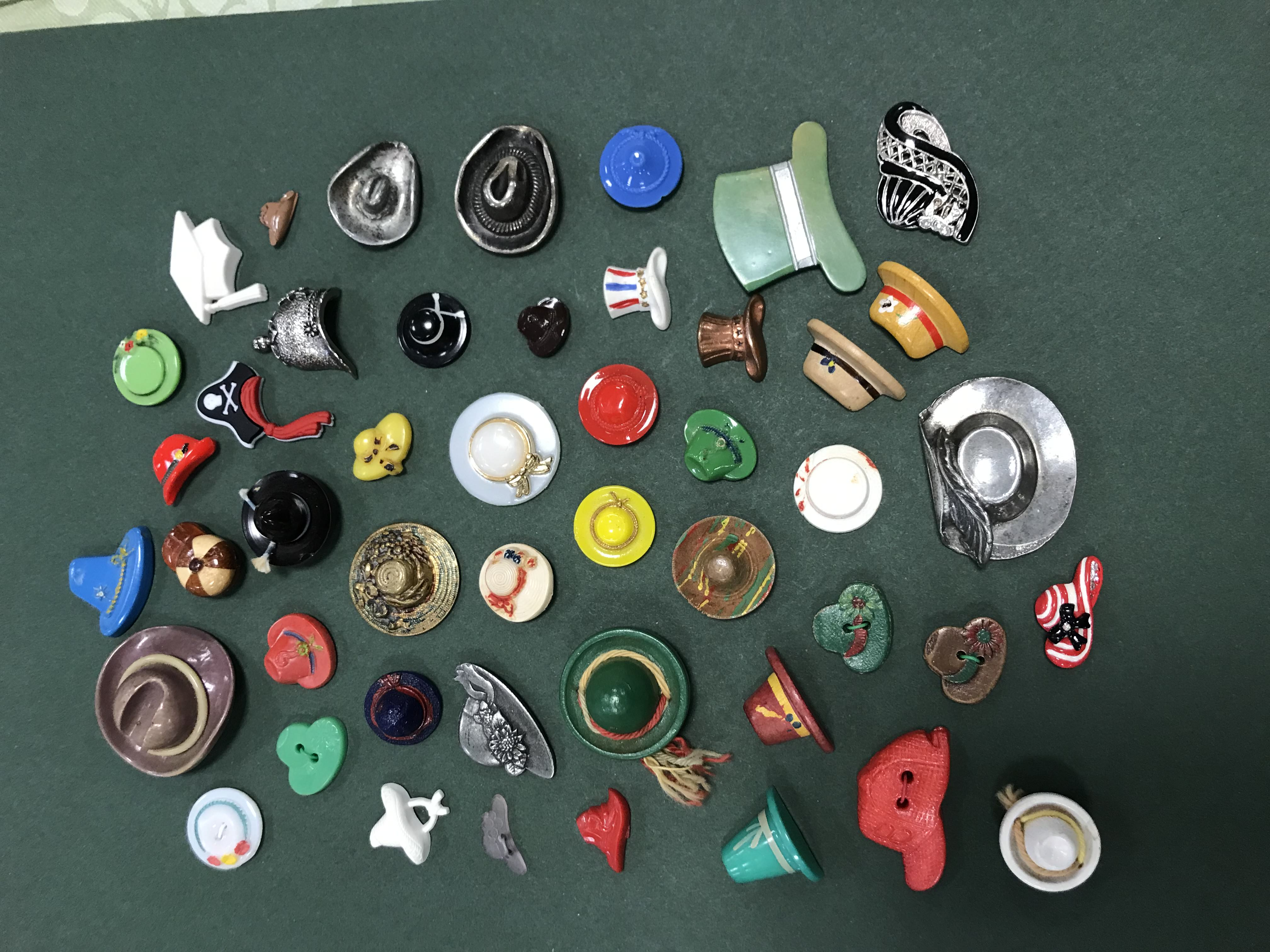
A collection of hat-shaped buttons

Those who collect buttons by topic might specialize in bird buttons, flowers, animals, insects. or virtually any topic of interest. Another type of collecting specialty is by the type of use the buttons saw. Examples are uniform buttons and non-military uniform buttons. Studio buttons, those made in small quantities primarily for button collectors, are another collecting area.

=== Collecting and competing using the classification system of the National Button Society ===
The National Button Society's classification system is used by collectors who enter and who judge button competitions in the United States, and by collectors or dealers for choosing specialties or organizing their buttons. It is included in the Society's Blue Book, which is issued periodically and provided to society members. The classification system defines important components:

- Divisions, such as old (pre-1918), junior (ages 13–17), or related specialties (such as buckles/clasps or button covers)
- Size

The classification sections are divided by

- Material type, divided very precisely by particular features of buttons of that material;
- Pictorials, again divided very precisely;
- Features or Types, such as borders, shapes, or inlay
- Age (18th century or earlier)
- Usage

== Organizations ==
There are numerous local, regional, and national button collecting organizations. National organizations include the National Button Society (US), which lists their purpose as "Educating, enjoying and preserving all that is beautiful and historic in buttons," the British Button Society, Fibule (France), and the Dutch Antique Button Society (Netherlands). Regional and local button organizations and clubs include the Victorian Button Collectors Club (Melbourne, Australia). The World Button Association (online worldwide) promotes button collecting with a mission to "Connect, educate and inspire a worldwide button community." This organization provides online meetings and resources for "button collectors, scholars, enthusiasts and the curious."

== See also ==
- Button
- Shank
- Pin-back button
