= Xianju National Park =

National park in Xianju County, Zhejiang, China

- Location within Zhejiang
- Type: National park
- Location: Xianju County, Zhejiang
- Coordinates: 28°41′32″N 120°36′41″E
- Area: 301-square-kilometre (116 sq mi)
- Created: 2015
- Operator: Xianju County Government
- Open: All year
- Website: en.xjgjgy.com

Chinese name
- Simplified Chinese: 仙居国家公园
- Traditional Chinese: 仙居國家公園
Transcriptions
Standard Mandarin
- Hanyu Pinyin: Xiānjū Guójiā Gōngyuán

Xianju National Park (Chinese: 仙居国家公园) is a national park in Xianju County, Zhejiang, China. It lies between the Kuocang Mountains (Chinese: 括苍山脉) and Dalei Mountain (Chinese: 大雷山) in southeastern Zhejiang province. It shrouded by the cloud and mist all the year around. It covers an area of 301-square-kilometre (116 sq mi).

== Natural history ==
The volcanic rock landform of Xianju National Park was shaped 120 million years ago. With the Pacific Plate diving beneath the Eurasia Plate, volcanoes in the coastal area of southeastern China erupted on a large scale. Between two eruptions, there wasn't new lava reaching the crater. Thus, in the weathering process, the crater gradually collapsed into a bowl-shaped pit and then became a lake with more and more water retained in it. After that, volcanoes got active and volcanic rock started to build up again. The volcanic eruptions brought very thick layers of volcanic rock. In the later stage, the Earth's crust rose and the exposed surface was eroded. With the increase in the erosion degree, the Earth's surface became a combination of various geomorphic types, including scabland, screen-shaped cliffs, door-shaped rock, pillar peaks and so on.

In June 1924, Ren-Chang Ching found longleaf torreya in Xianju. He collected a specimen and took it to the Arnold Arboretum of Harvard University in the United States. In 1925 he named the tree after his academic supervisor, John George Jack.

In March 2014, it began to build a national park and completed in November 2015.

== Geology ==
In the park, there is the most typical and complete geomorphic system of rhyolitic mountainous land. In terms of volcanic geology and petrology, the region is of great scientific value. The volcanic rock is acidic in the park. Its silicon dioxide content is over 66%.

The park has 101 major geological relics and 24 water views. In the geomorphic landscape of Xianju National Park, Fanzheng Rock is one of the iconic pillar peaks. With the height of 218 metres (715 ft) and the diameter of 60 metres (200 ft), it towers aloft on a mountain which is more than 500 metres (1,600 ft) high. Its flat top like a huge steamer, the mist hazing the peak, is just like the steam coming from the rice steamer, that's why the peak is called Fanzheng Rock (Chinese: 饭蒸岩; lit. 'Rice-steamer-like rock').

== Fauna and Flora ==
The park is designated as a wildlife preserve. There are strict regulations on the rocks, plants, animals and birds from the park. It has a forest coverage rate of over 93%. The park has well-preserved evergreen broad-leaved forests.

Within the boundaries of the park, the following number of species are known to live: 322 species of vertebrates (of them, there are 26 species under class II national protection, such as pangolin, long-tailed goral, reeves, sumatran serow, black muntjac, silver pheasant, masked palm civet and wild boar), 1,505 species of vascular plants (of them, there are 14 species under class I and II national protection, such as Taxus chinensis var. mairei and longleaf torreya), 57 species of ferns, 18 species of gymnosperms, and 1,365 species of angiosperms.

== River ==
Yong'an River (Chinese: 永安溪), known as the mother river of Xianju County, originates from Heaven's Tip (Chinese: 天堂尖) at an altitude of 1,184 metres (3,885 ft). The 141-kilometre (88 mi)-long river has 38 tributaries of different sizes in the Xianju County, those tributaries flow into the Yong'an River from the south and north.

== Culture ==
In October 2018, Xianju National Park served as a shooting location for the CCTV travel documentary series Homeland, Dreamland.

== See also ==
- List of national parks of China
