= Qiaotou, Yongjia County =

Qiaotou 桥头镇
- Town
- Interactive map of Qiaotou
- Coordinates: 28°10′02″N 120°28′42″E
- Country: People's Republic of China
- Province: Zhejiang
- Prefecture-level city: Wenzhou
- County: Yongjia

Population
  - Total: 66,171
- Time zone: UTC+8 (China Standard)
- Postal code: 325100
- Area code: 0577

Qiaotou (simplified Chinese: 桥头; traditional Chinese: 橋頭; pinyin: Qiáotóu; lit. 'Bridgehead') is a town of western Yongjia County in southern Zhejiang province, China, on the northern (left) shore of the Ou River, located upstream from Wenzhou.

Qiaotou is known as the "button capital of the world" since, as of 2015, the town produces around 60 percent of the world's supply of clothing buttons. In addition, the town makes 80 percent of the world's zippers. Qiaotou manufactures 15 billion buttons and 200 million meters of zippers a year and is the site of the China Qiaotou Button City trade center.

The nearest major highway is the G1513 Wenzhou–Lishui Expressway, located just south of the town centre.
