= Xiannü, Jiangsu =

Xiannü 仙女镇
- Town
- Location in Jiangsu
- Coordinates: 32°25′47″N 119°33′3″E
- Country: People's Republic of China
- Province: Jiangsu
- Prefecture-level city: Yangzhou
- District: Jiangdu District
- Time zone: UTC+8 (China Standard)

Xiannü (Chinese: 仙女; pinyin: Xiānnǚ) is a town under the administration of Jiangdu District, Yangzhou, Jiangsu, China. As of 2023, it administers 33 residential communities and 31 villages:

== Residential communities ==
- Xiannü Community
- Dongyuan Community (东苑社区)
- Longchuan Community (龙川社区)
- Longcheng Community (龙城社区)
- Yudai Community (玉带社区)
- Gaoyang Community (高阳社区)
- Yinjiang Community (引江社区)
- Yuwanggong Community (禹王宫社区)
- Xiyuan Community (西苑社区)
- Yunfeng Community (云峰社区)
- Beiyuan Community (北苑社区)
- Longxi Community (龙溪社区)
- Nanyuan Community (南苑社区)
- Longdu Community (龙都社区)
- Xindu Community (新都社区)
- Zhuanqiao Community (砖桥社区)
- Shuanggou Community (双沟社区)
- Liba Community (李坝社区)
- Lehe Community (乐和社区)
- Chunjiang Community (春江社区)
- Zhenbei Community (镇北社区)
- Kongzhuang Community (孔庄社区)
- Fanzhuang Community (樊庄社区)
- Nanwu Community (南吴社区)
- Tangzhuang Community (唐庄社区)
- Shuangxian Community (双仙社区)
- Jinqiao Community (金桥社区)
- Mingzhu Community (明珠社区)
- Zhanggang Community (张纲社区)
- Shangmaocheng Community (商贸城社区)
- Sanhe Community (三和社区)
- Qiaodong Community (桥东社区)
- Jianle Community (建乐社区)

== Villages ==
- Jiangqiao Village (江桥村)
- Qizha Village (七闸村)
- Zhengyi Village (正谊村)
- Xinmin Village (新民村)
- Chenzhuang Village (陈庄村)
- Minhe Village (民和村)
- Xinhuo Village (新火村)
- Henggou Village (横沟村)
- Tongqiao Village (同桥村)
- Sanyou Village (三友村)
- Sanxing Village (三星村)
- Suxin Village (苏新村)
- Hanxi Village (涵西村)
- Fantao Village (樊套村)
- Qinfeng Village (勤丰村)
- Dengyuan Village (邓院村)
- Xinhe Village (新河村)
- Chenxing Village (陈行村)
- Huangzhuang Village (黄庄村)
- Zhoushu Village (周墅村)
- Chendian Village (陈甸村)
- Sandang Village (三荡村)
- Caozhuang Village (曹庄村)
- Caowanglinyuanchang Village (曹王林园场村)
- Zhenxi Village (镇西村)
- Xinhe Village (新和村)
- Changhong Village (长红村)
- Xingang Village (新港村)
- Jinling Village (金陵村)
- Xinhua Village (新华村)
- Huashi Village (化市村)
