= Yuanfang De Jia =

- Also known as: A Walk in China, The Distant Family, or Home in the Distance
- 远方的家
- Genre: Documentary
- Country of origin: China
- Original language: Mandarin
- No. of seasons: 5
- No. of episodes: 431

Production
- Production location: China
- Running time: approx. 45 minutes
- Production company: China Central Television

Original release
- Network: CCTV-1, CCTV-4, and CCTV-22
- Release: 1 December 2010 – present

Yuanfang De Jia (Chinese: 远方的家; pinyin: Yuǎnfāng De Jiā, officially Homeland, Dreamland) is a travel documentary series created by China Central Television, which was first broadcast on 1 December 2010, on CCTV-1, CCTV-4, and CCTV-22.

== Seasons ==
=== Season 1 ===
Bianjiang Xing (Chinese: 边疆行; pinyin: Biānjiāng Xíng) also known as Walking in the Chinese Border. The first season focus on the land borders around China with the crew starting at Fangchenggang in Guangxi traveling along the 22,800 kilometers of land border in a clockwise direction to Dandong in Liaoning and traveling through Guangxi, Yunnan, Tibet, Xinjiang, Gansu, Inner Mongolia, Heilongjiang, Jilin, and Liaoning. Bianjiang Xing shooting time took up to six months.

=== Season 2 ===
Yanhai Xing (Chinese: 沿海行; pinyin: Yánhǎi Xíng) also known as Walking along the Chinese Coastline. The second season focus on the eastern coast of China with the crew starting at Dandong in Liaoning the end point of the first season traveling along the 18,000 kilometers of China's coast to Fangchenggang in Guangxi the starting point of the first season and traveling through Liaoning, Hebei, Tianjin, Shandong, Jiangsu, Shanghai, Zhejiang, Fujian, Guangdong, and finally back in Guangxi.

=== Season 3 ===
Beiwei 30° Zhongguo Xing (Chinese: 北纬30°中国行; pinyin: Běiwěi 30° Zhōngguó Xíng) also known as Thirty Degrees North Latitude - Voyage to China. The third season focus on the 30th parallel north in China with the crew starting at Zhoushan in Zhejiang traveling west across 20,000 kilometers of China's 30th parallel north to Ngari Prefecture in Tibet and traveling through Zhejiang, Jiangxi, Anhui, Hubei, Hunan, Chongqing, Guizhou, Sichuan, and Tibet.

=== Season 4 ===
Baishan Baichuan Xing (Chinese: 百山百川行; pinyin: Bǎishān Bǎichuān Xíng) also known as Walking along through a Hundred Mountains and Rivers. The fourth season currently on air focusing on rural China along the mountains and rivers in China.

=== Season 5 ===
Jianghe Wanli Xing (Chinese: 江河万里行; pinyin: Jiānghé Wànlǐ Xíng) is the fifth season of Yuanfang De Jia.
