= Button =

Small fastener

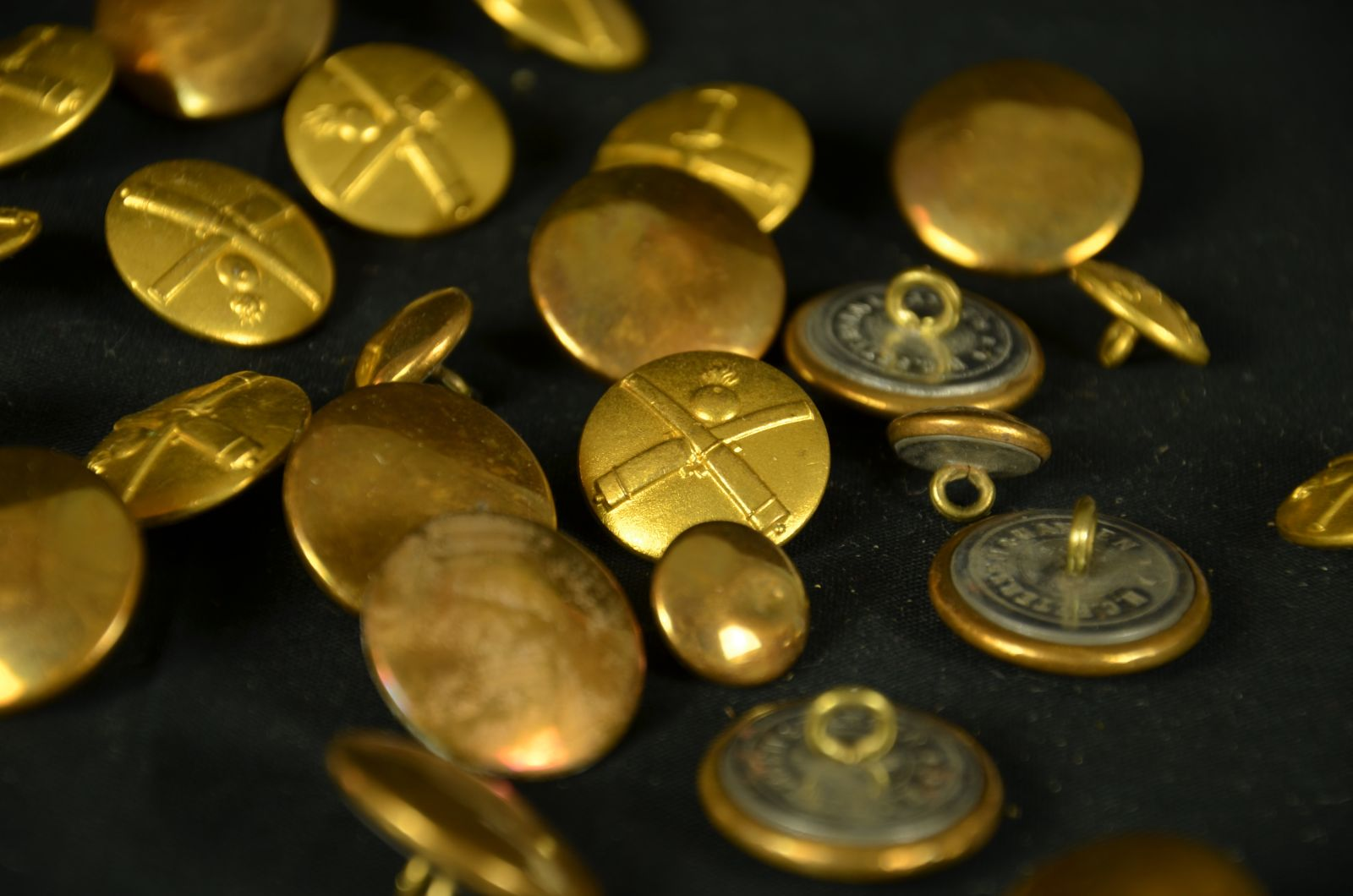
Brass buttons from the uniform of a Danish World War I artillery lieutenant

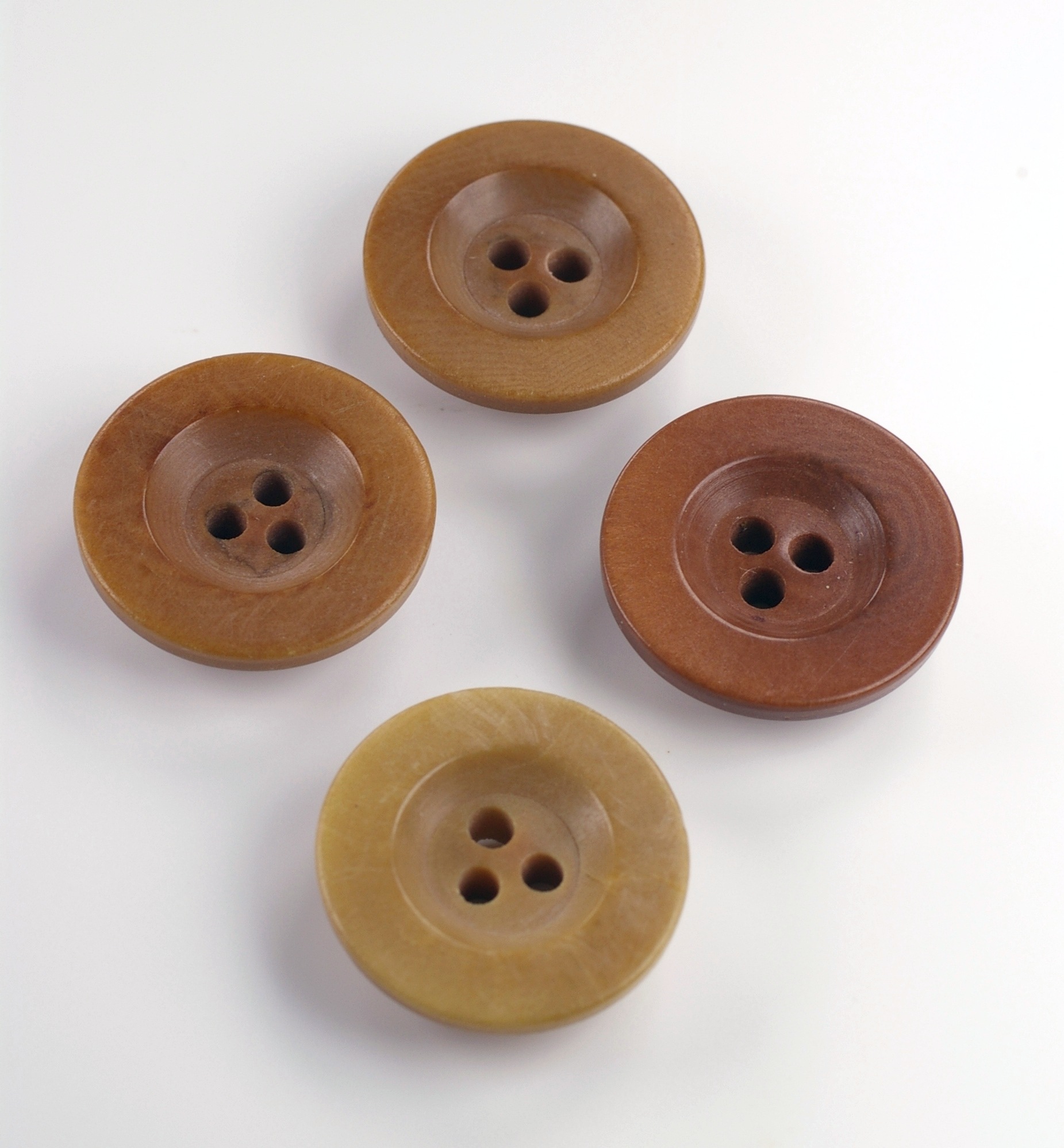
Modern buttons made from vegetable ivory

A button (/bʌtən/) is a fastener that joins two pieces of fabric together by slipping through a loop or by sliding through a buttonhole.

In modern clothing and fashion design, buttons are commonly made of plastic but also may be made of metal, wood, or seashell. Buttons can also be used on containers such as wallets and bags. Buttons may be sewn onto garments and similar items exclusively for purposes of ornamentation. In the applied arts and craft, a button can be an example of folk art, studio craft, or even a miniature work of art. In archaeology, a button can be a significant artifact.

== History ==
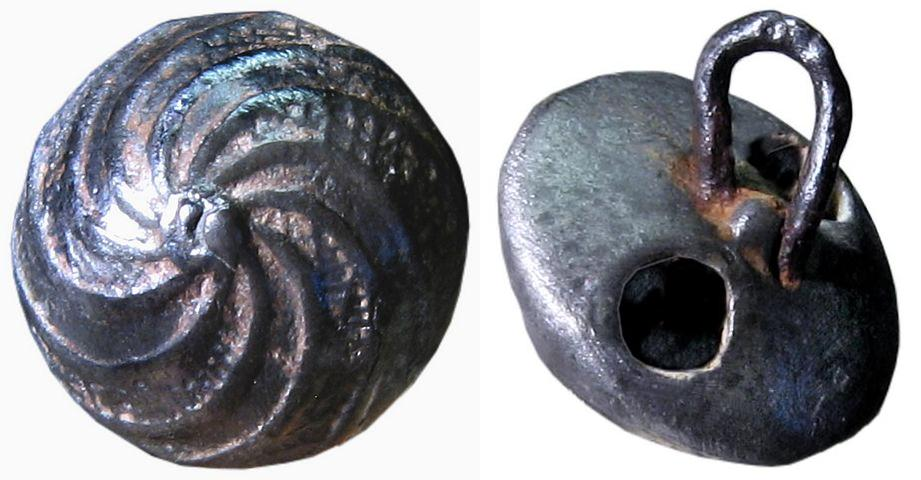
Spanish button (approx. 12 mm) from c. 1650–1675

Buttons and button-like objects used as ornaments or seals rather than fasteners have been discovered in the Indus Valley Civilization during its Kot Diji phase (c. 2800–2600 BC). Buttons as apparel have been found at sites of the Catacomb culture, Russia (2500–1950 BC), at the Tomb of the Eagles, Scotland (2200–1800 BC), and at Bronze Age sites in China (c. 2000–1500 BC) and Ancient Rome.

Buttons made from seashell were used by the Indus Valley Civilization for ornamental purposes by 2000 BC. Some buttons were carved into geometric shapes and were pierced so that they could be attached to clothing with thread. Ian McNeil (1990) holds that "the button was originally used more as an ornament than as a fastening, the earliest known being found at Mohenjo-daro in the Indus Valley. It is made of a curved shell and is about 5000 years old."

Egypt's Eighteenth Dynasty left behind ornate wig covers, fabricated through sewing buttons formed of precious metals onto strips of backing material.

Leatherwork from the Roman Empire incorporates some of the first buttonholes, with the legionary's loculus closed through the insertion of a metallic buckle, or button into a leather slit. A similar mechanism would later feature in early medieval footwear. Buttons appeared as a means to close cuffs in the Byzantine Empire and to fasten the necks of Egyptian tunics by no later than the 5th century.

=== Middle Ages ===
It has been proposed that the European Crusaders brought the innovation of the button loop back from the Middle East, allowing for more fitted garments for men. About this time, the Vikings were also using buttons, which they had come across through their trading partners. Prior to the introduction of the buttonhole, two pieces of fabric were butted together, rather than overlapped, and toggles, belts, or lacings were used. Buttonholes to fasten clothing first appeared in 13th-century Germany. The growing importance of buttons was marked by the establishment of button making guilds in the 13th century. Initially, King Louis IX of France included button makers in the established rosary makers guild, but later regulations categorized button makers in three categories: those who worked in horn, bone, and ivory, those who used metals, and makers who used precious metals and glass.

=== Renaissance ===
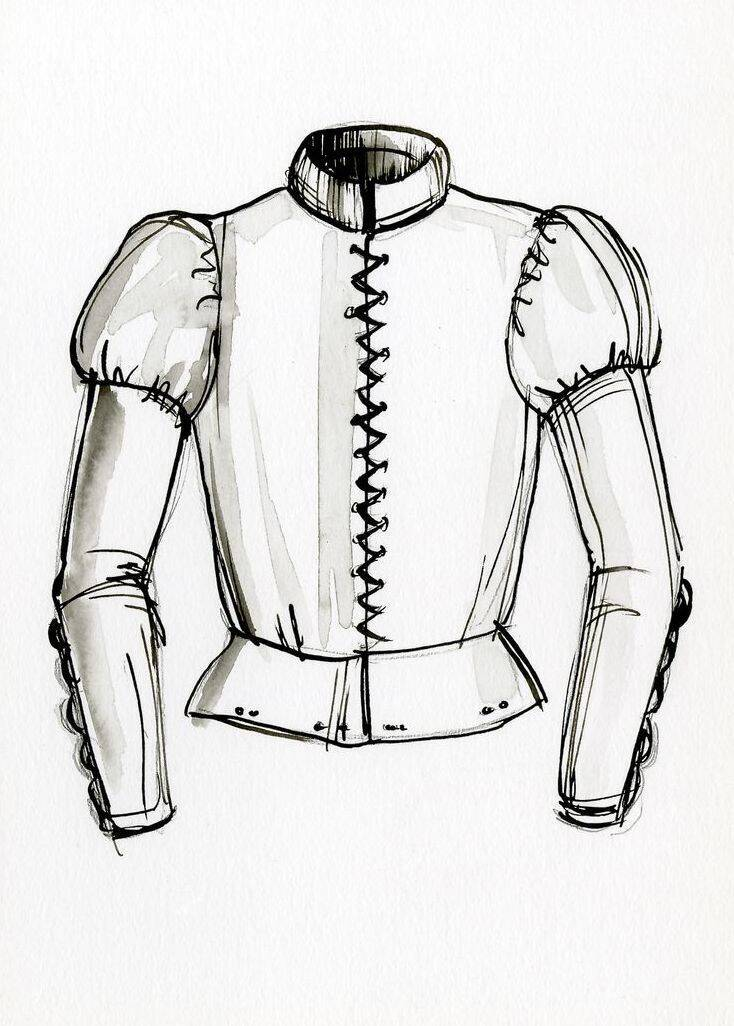
A doublet, a close fitting men's jacket worn in the Renaissance. This one is laced.

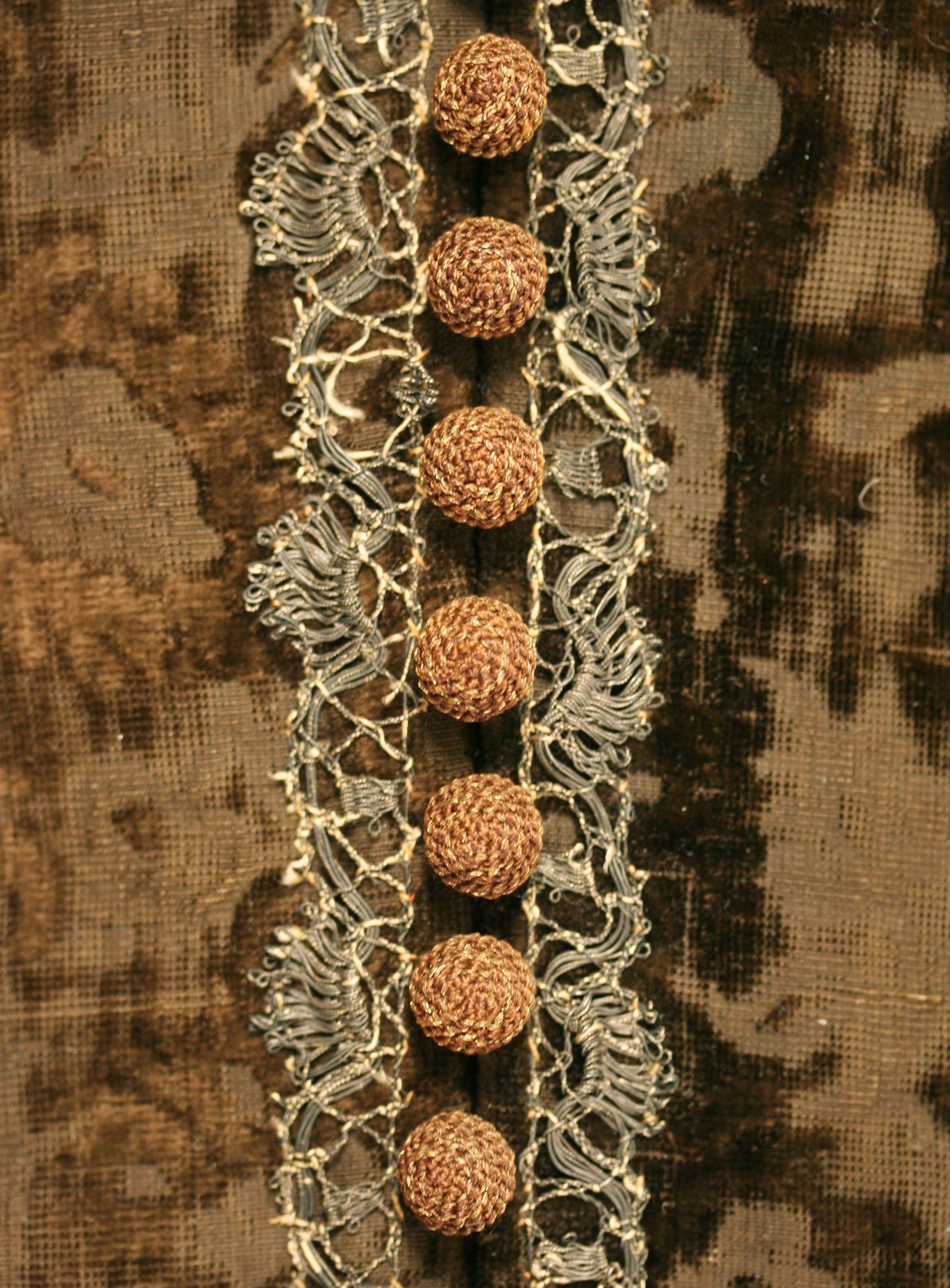
Silk buttons on a late 16th century jerkin from the Metropolitan Museum of Art's Costume Institute

The fitted fashions of the Renaissance made use of buttons. For example, later variations of the tight-fitting jacket known as the doublet had rows of many buttons. An additional opportunity to use buttons came with the incorporatinon of detachable sleeves into garments. This practice had been in use in Florence since the 1200s. Sleeves could be switched out to be washed or to be replaced by fancier sleeves demanded by particular settings. Women's fashion at this time still used lacings, and thus buttons on their clothing were generally decorative.

Buttons were also impacted by the elegant culture of the Renaissance courts. They were no longer seen as simply utilitarian objects, but rather as luxury items that could reflect wealth and status. These buttons, some of which were made of precious metal encrusted with jewels, were seen as jewelry. Because their owners might want to move these valuable buttons from one piece of clothing to another, they often were not sewn on with thread. Rather, their shanks were pushed through the fabric and were held in place with metal strips inserted through the shank. At the time, wood, bone, brass and pewter made it possible for less expensive buttons to be produced.

=== 17th century ===
Fabric-covered buttons and embroidered buttons became popular in Europe in the 17th century. These were often small, and served a decorative, rather than functional, purpose. The early 17th century short jerkin, wide breeches and cloak may have been adorned by dozens of buttons, and with so many, they needed to be lightweight. The mid century French-originated knee-length coat, the justaucorps, had buttons from the neck to the knee, buttoned sleeve cuffs, and buttoned flaps on the pockets.

French law, concerned with protecting the silk industry in Paris and Lyons, required buttons to be covered in silk. On the other hand, England did not allow fabric buttons in the late 1600s and early 1700s. Tailors could make fabric-covered buttons with leftover fabric, which threatened the guild of button makers.

=== As containers ===
Since at least the 17th century, when box-like metal buttons were constructed especially for the purpose, buttons have been one of the items in which drug smugglers have attempted to hide and transport illegal substances. At least one modern smuggler has tried to use this method.

Also making use of the storage possibilities of metal buttons, during the World Wars, British and US military locket buttons were made, containing miniature working compasses.

== Materials and manufacture ==
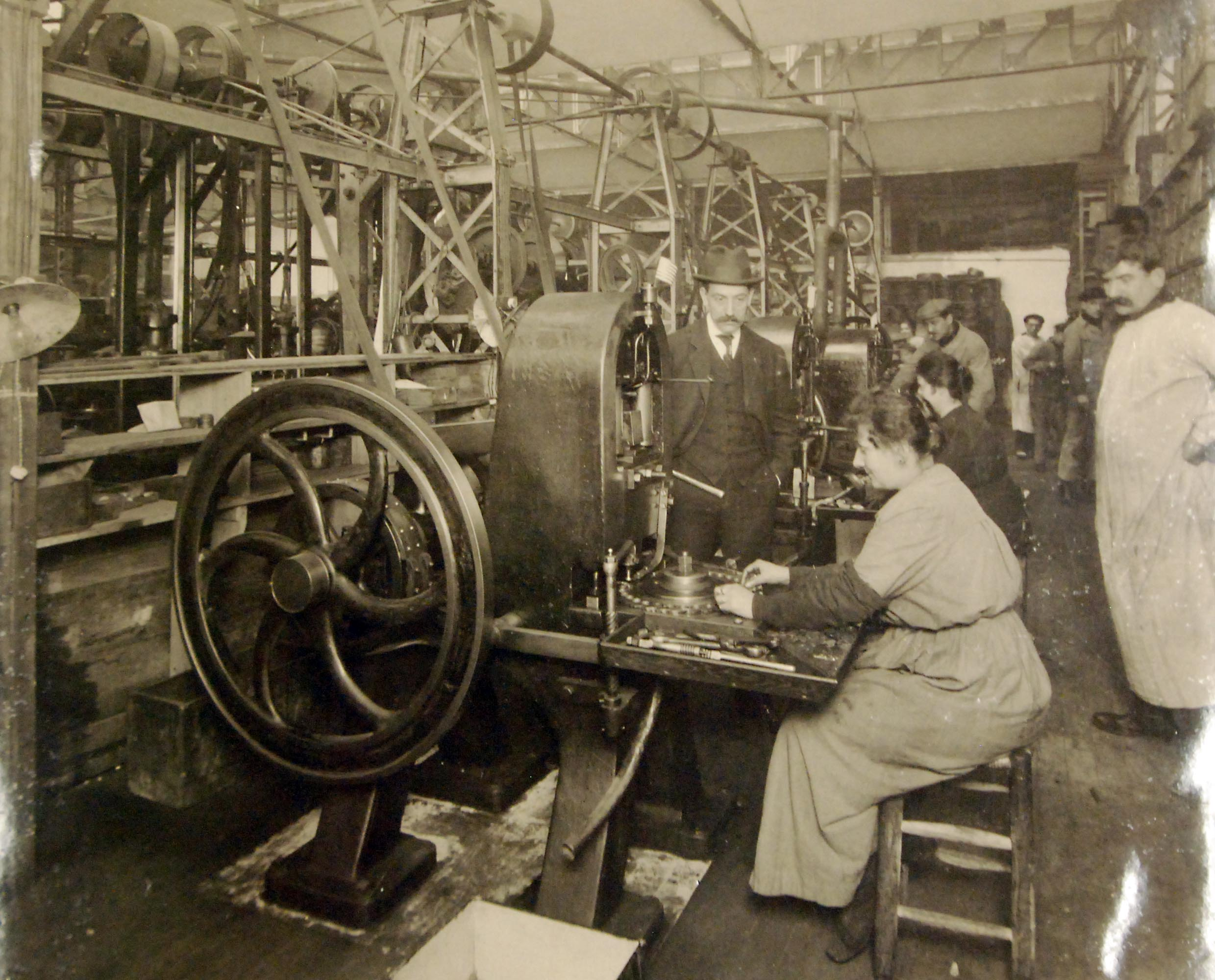
Button stamping machine at the Henri Jamorski Button Factory in Paris, 1919

Because buttons have been manufactured from almost every possible material, both natural and synthetic, and combinations of both, the history of the material composition of buttons reflects the timeline of materials technology.

Buttons can be individually crafted by artisans, craftspeople or artists from raw materials or found objects (for example fossils), or a combination of both. Alternatively, they can be the product of low-tech cottage industry or be mass-produced in high-tech factories. Buttons made by artists are art objects, known to button collectors as "studio buttons" (or simply "studios", from studio craft).

In 1918, the US government made an extensive survey of the international button market, which listed buttons made of vegetable ivory, metal, glass, galalith, silk, linen, cotton-covered crochet, lead, snap fasteners, enamel, rubber, buckhorn, wood, horn, bone, leather, paper, pressed cardboard, mother-of-pearl, celluloid, porcelain, composition, tin, zinc, xylonite, stone, cloth-covered wooden forms, and papier-mâché. Vegetable ivory was said to be the most popular for suits and shirts, and papier-mâché far and away the commonest sort of shoe button.

Nowadays, hard plastic, seashell, metals, and wood are the most common materials used in button-making; the others tending to be used only in premium or antique apparel, or found in collections.

Over 60% of the world's button supply comes from Qiaotou, Yongjia County, China.

=== Decoration and coating techniques ===
Historically, fashions in buttons have also reflected trends in applied aesthetics and the applied visual arts, with buttonmakers using techniques from jewellery making, ceramics, sculpture, painting, printmaking, metalworking, weaving and others. The following are just a few of the construction and decoration techniques that have been used in button-making:

- Arita porcelain
- Cloisonné
- Daguerreotype
- Electroplating
- Embroidery
- Filigree
- Intaglio
- Lacquerware
- Lithography
- Metallizing
- Metal openwork
- Opus interassile
- Passementerie
- Portrait miniatures
- Satsuma ware
- Vitreous enamel

=== Styles of attachment ===
- Flat or sew-through buttons have holes through which thread is sewn to attach the button. Flat buttons may be attached by sewing machine rather than by hand and may be used with heavy fabrics by working a thread shank to extend the height of the button above the fabric.
- Magnetic buttons, as the name implies, are buttons that attach to each other by being magnetic. The buttons can be attached either by sewing or snapping them into the fabric.
- Shank buttons have a hollow protrusion on the back through which thread is sewn to attach the button. Button shanks may be made from a separate piece of the same or a different substance as the button itself, and added to the back of the button, or be carved or moulded directly onto the back of the button, in which latter case the button is referred to by collectors as having a 'self-shank'.
- Snap fasteners (also pressure buttons or press studs) are metal (usually brass) round discs pinched through the fabric. They are often found on clothing, in particular on denim pieces such as pants and jackets. They are more securely fastened to the material. As they rely on a metal rivet attached securely to the fabric, pressure buttons are difficult to remove without compromising the fabric's integrity. They are made of two couples: the male stud couple and the female stud couple. Each couple has one front (or top) and rear (or bottom) side (the fabric goes in the middle).
- Stud buttons (also push-through buttons or just studs) are composed from an actual button, connected to a second, button-like element by a narrow metal or plastic bar. Pushed through two opposing holes within what is meant to be kept together, the actual button and its counterpart press it together, keeping it joined. Popular examples of such buttons are shirt studs and cufflinks.
- Toggles are stick-like, with a cord attached at the center. They are passed endways through a hole and then rotated sideways.
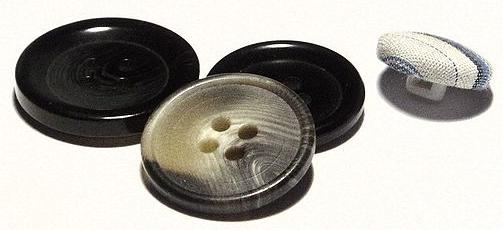
Three plastic sew-through buttons (left) and one shank, fabric-covered button (right)

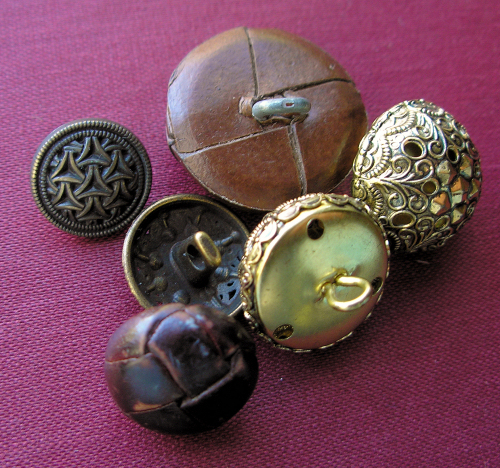
An assortment of shank buttons

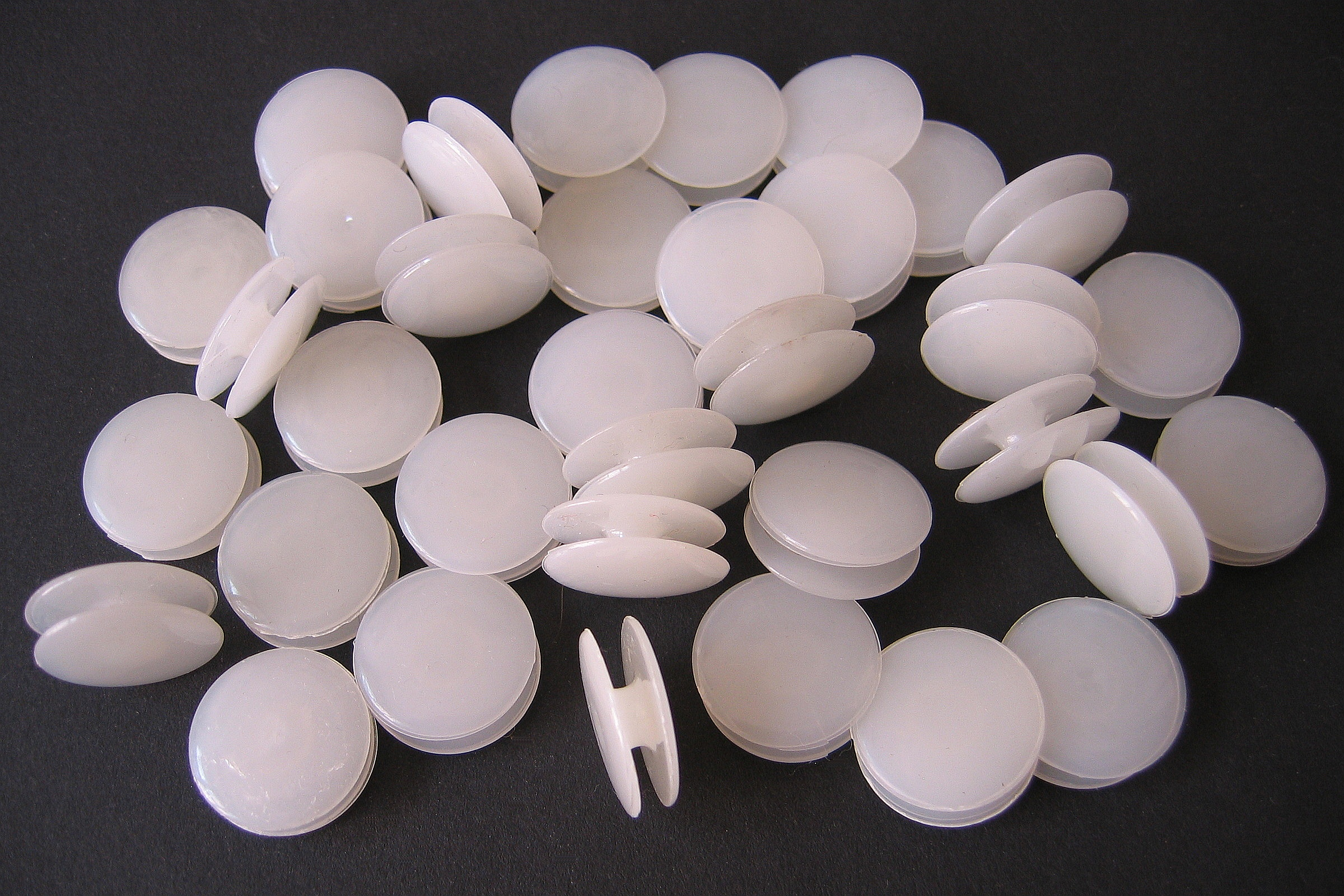
Plastic studs for bedclothes

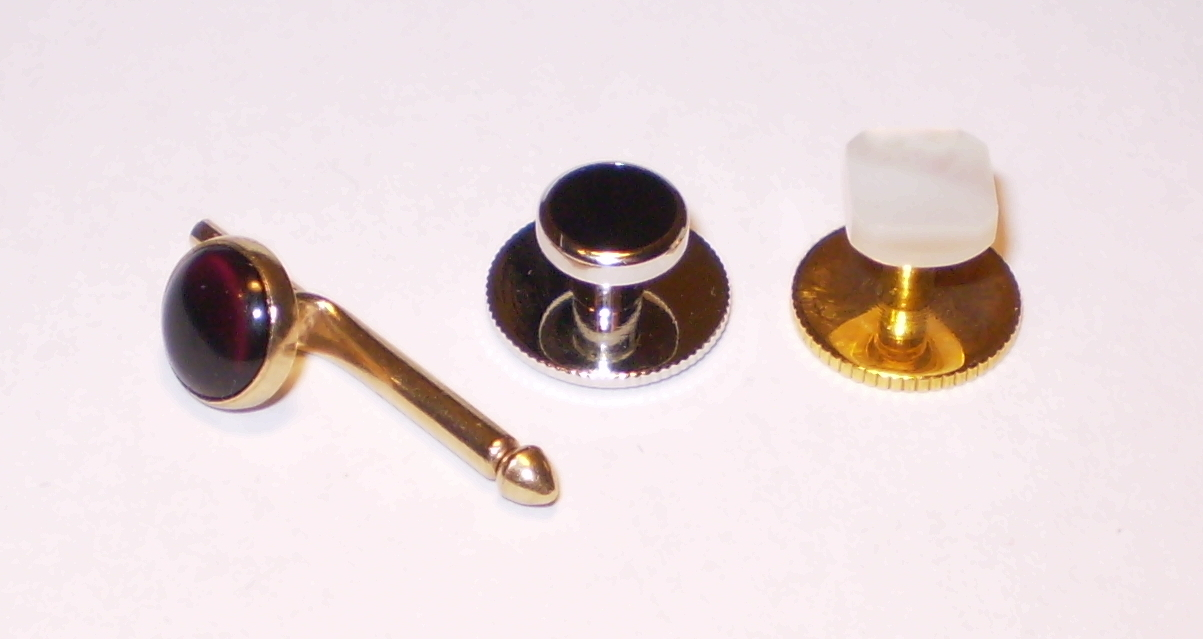
Shirt studs

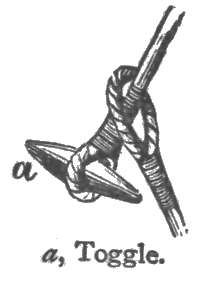
Illustration from 1908 Chambers's Twentieth Century. Toggle, n. (naut.) a short bar of wood, tapering from the middle towards each end, placed in an eye at the end of a rope, to keep the end from passing through a loop or knot.

=== Fabric buttons ===
- Covered buttons are fabric-covered forms with a separate back piece that secures the fabric over the knob.
- Mandarin buttons or frogs are knobs made of intricately knotted strings. Mandarin buttons are a key element in Mandarin dress (Qi Pao and cheongsam in Chinese), where they are closed with loops. Pairs of mandarin buttons worn as cuff links are called silk knots.
- Worked or cloth buttons are created by embroidering or crocheting tight stitches (usually with linen thread) over a knob or ring called a form. Dorset buttons, handmade from the 17th century to 1750, and Death head buttons are of this type.

=== Button sizes ===
The size of the button depends on its use. Shirt buttons are generally small, and spaced close together, whereas coat buttons are larger and spaced further apart. Buttons are commonly measured in lignes (also called lines and abbreviated L), with 40 lines equal to 1 inch. For example, some standard sizes of buttons are 16 lignes (10.16 mm, standard buttons of men's shirts) and 32 lignes (20.32 mm, typical button on suit jackets).

== In museums and galleries ==
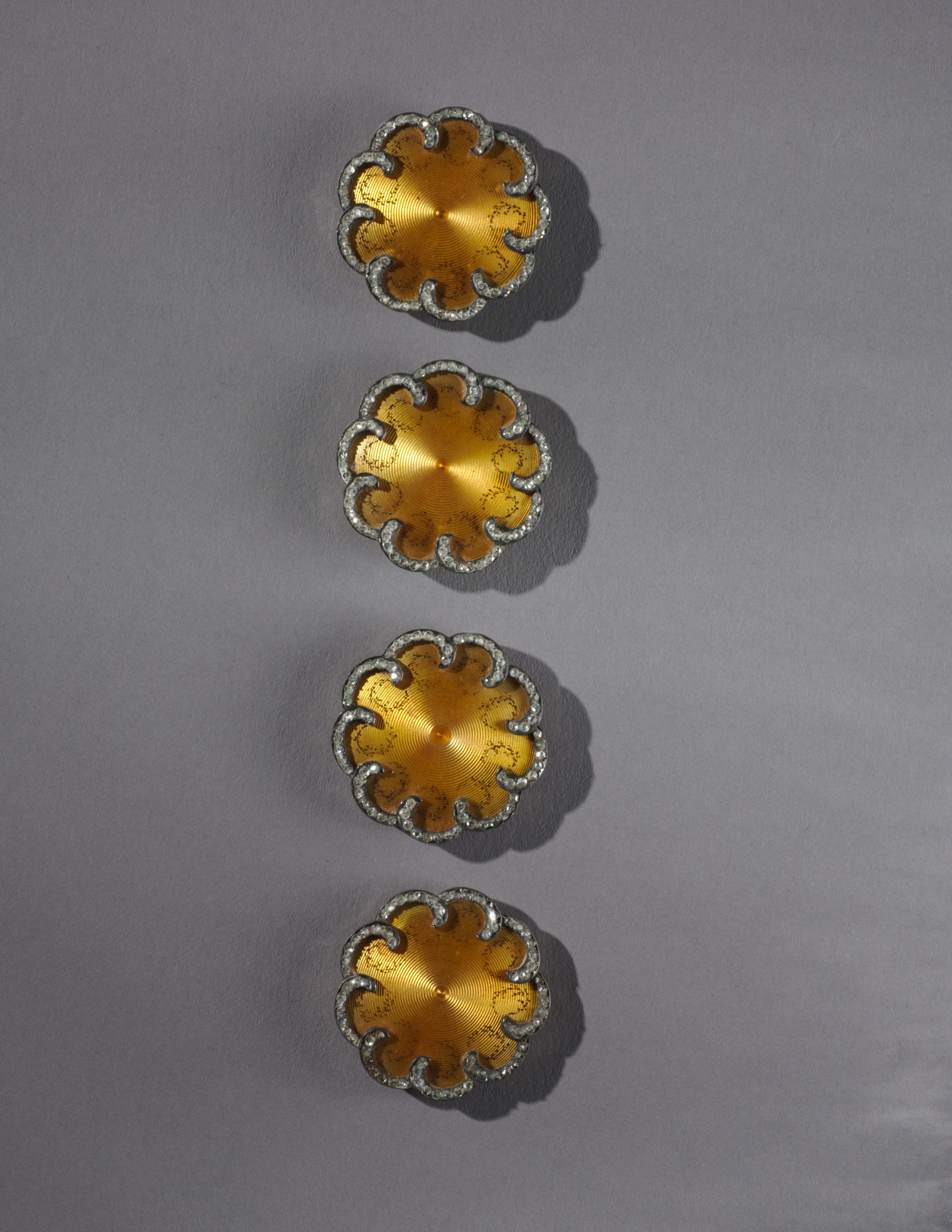
Peter Carl Fabergé buttons in the Cleveland Museum of Art

Some museums and art galleries hold culturally, historically, politically, and/or artistically significant buttons in their collections. The Victoria and Albert Museum has many buttons, particularly in its jewellery collection, as does the Smithsonian Institution.

Hammond Turner & Sons, a button-making company in Birmingham, hosts an online museum with an image gallery and historical button-related articles, including an 1852 article on button-making by Charles Dickens. In the US, large button collections are on public display at the Waterbury Button Museum of Waterbury, Connecticut, the Keep Homestead Museum of Monson, Massachusetts, which also hosts an extensive button archive, and in Gurnee, Illinois, at The Button Room.

== Gallery ==
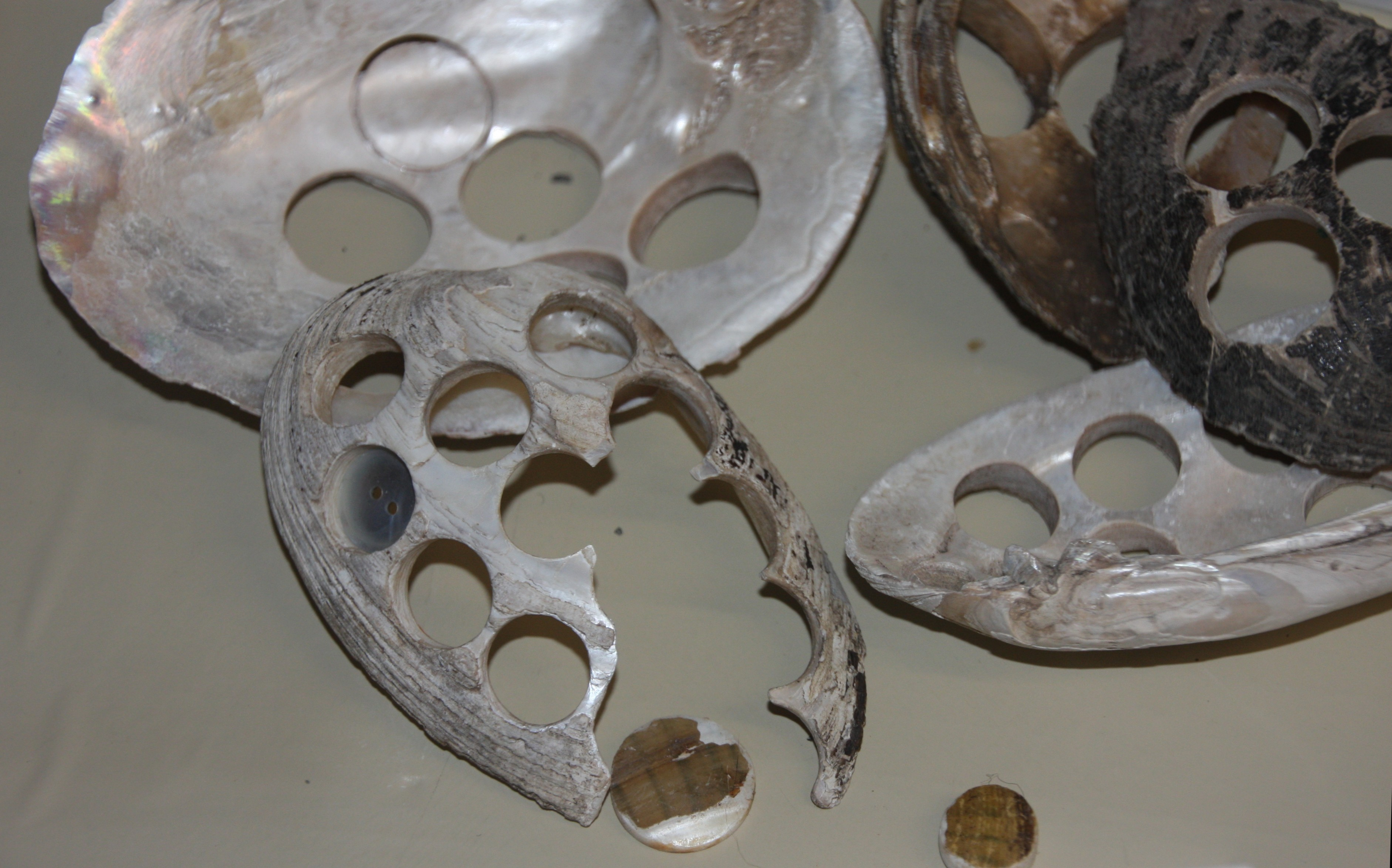
Clam shells used for making buttons

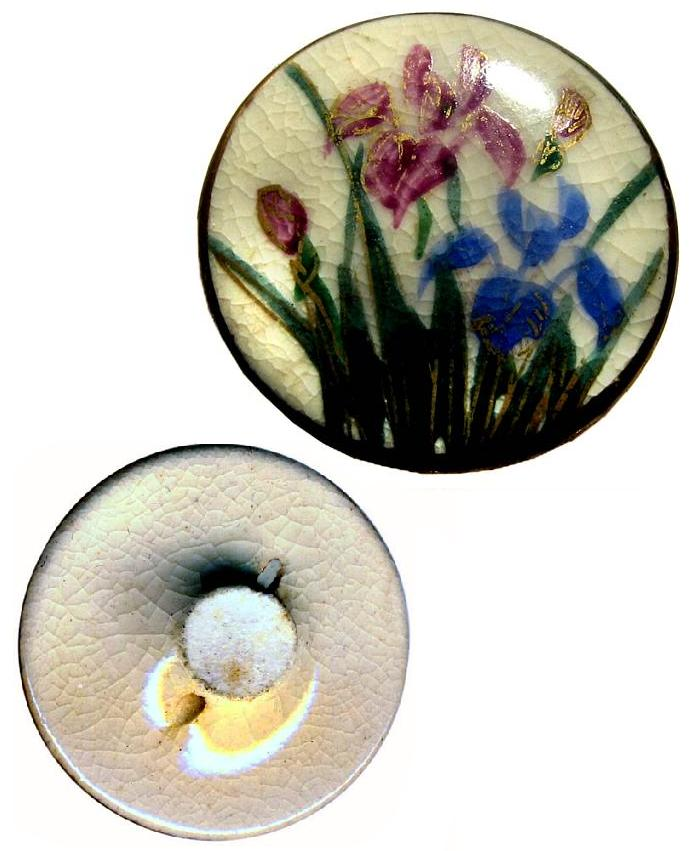
Hand-painted Satsuma ware self-shank button

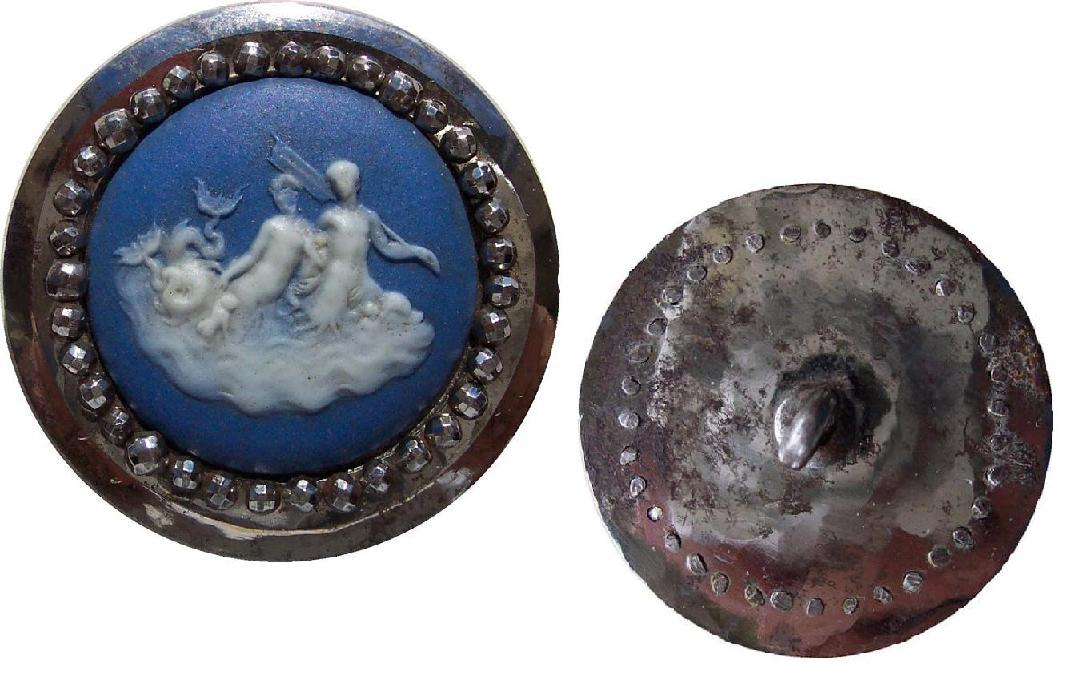
Wedgwood button with Boulton cut steels, depicting a mermaid & family, England, c. 1760. Diameter just over 32 mm (1 1/4")

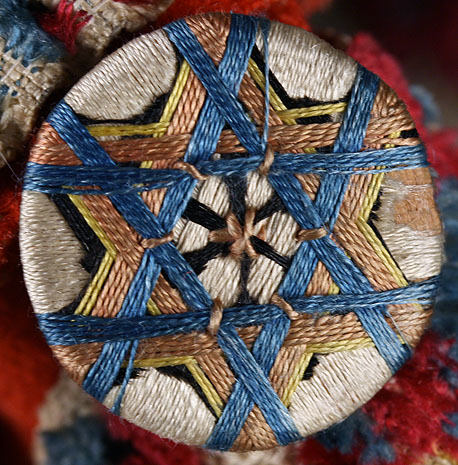
A thread covered button

== Positioning ==
Classic clothing has the button on the left side for women and on the right side for men. The reasons for this are unclear, but the choice for men's clothing is usually attributed to the need to draw weapons from the left to right; the weapon would then not catch on opening of the clothing. For women's clothing the common reason given is that in times when upper-class women's clothing was quite elaborate, servants were needed for dressing, and the left placement of the buttons was more convenient for right-handed maids. Some Jews reverse this, following statements in the Torah that favor dressing first on the right side, or from the Kabbalah, in which the right side denotes goodness.

== In politics ==
The mainly American tradition of politically significant clothing buttons appears to have begun with the first presidential inauguration of George Washington in 1789. Known to collectors as "Washington Inaugurals", they were made of copper, brass or Sheffield plate, in large sizes for coats and smaller sizes for breeches. Made in twenty-two patterns and hand-stamped, they are now extremely valuable cultural artifacts.

Between about 1840 and 1916, clothing buttons were used in American political campaigns, and still exist in collections today. Initially, these buttons were predominantly made of brass (though horn and rubber buttons with stamped or moulded designs also exist) and had loop shanks. Around 1860 the badge or pin-back style of construction, which replaced the shanks with long pins, probably for use on lapels and ties, began to appear.

One common practice that survived until recent times on campaign buttons and badges was to include the image of George Washington with that of the candidate in question.

Some of the most famous campaign buttons are those made for Abraham Lincoln. Memorial buttons commemorating Lincoln's inaugurations and other life events, including his birth and death, were also made, and are also considered highly collectible.

== See also ==
- Koumpounophobia, fear of buttons

== Sources ==
- Luscomb, Sally C. (2003). The Collector's Encyclopedia of Buttons (5th ed.). Atglen, PA: Schiffer. ISBN 0-7643-1815-2. LCCN 2003101645.
