= Xianju Library =

Public library in Xianju, Zhejiang, China

- 仙居县图书馆
- 28°44′35.8″N 120°29′35.58″E
- Location: No. 2 Jiefang Street, Xianju County, China
- Type: County public library
- Established: 1927 (Xianju Public Library); August 1, 1978 (Xianju Library)

Collection
- Items collected: 811314 books (July, 2018)

Access and use
- Access requirements: Xianju Library Card
- Members: 21466 (May, 2017)

Other information
- Affiliation: Xianju County People's Government; Bureau of Culture, Radio, Television, Tourism, and Sports of Xianju County
- Website: http://www.xjlib.net

Xianju County Library (Chinese: 仙居县图书馆), also known as Xianju Library (仙居图书馆), is a county-level public library located in Xianju, Taizhou, Zhejiang Province, People's Republic of China. It is under the jurisdiction of the Xianju County People's Government and is supervised by the Bureau of Culture, Radio, Television, Tourism, and Sports of Xianju County. The library building is located at No. 2 Jiefang Street in Xianju County and includes several branches and academies in various forms. As of July 2018, the collection of Xianju County Library reached 811,314 volumes. In 2018, it was promoted to a national first-grade library.

The history of the library can be traced back to the Xianju County Public Library established in 1927. Subsequently, it was divided into the Book Department of Xianju County Public Education Institute, the Library Room of Xianju County People's Cultural Palace, and the Library Room of Xianju County Cultural Palace. These institutions were the predecessors of the independent Xianju County Library established in August 1978. The current library building was constructed in 1986, with an area ranking at the bottom among those in Taizhou, making it unable to meet the daily needs. The ongoing construction of the Xianju County Library as part of the "Xianju County Urban Cultural Complex" will address this issue by relocating the entire library.

== History ==
In the spring of the 16th year of the Republic of China (1927), Wang Shijiao of Shuikongtou Village in Xianju Chengguan donated 50 yuan and assisted with 1 mu of farmland to establish a reading room. Subsequently, the Xianju County government convened people from all walks of life to discuss and establish the Xianju County Public Library, with the library located in the Wenming Building. In August of the 18th year of the Republic of China, following the order of the Provincial Department of Education, the Xianju County People's Education Institute was established, and the original County Public Library was renamed the Book Department of the Xianju County People's Education Institute. In the 27th year of the Republic of China, the Provincial Department of Education ordered the disbandment of the People's Education Institute and its replacement with a mobile teaching group, while also approving the establishment of a county library. Thus, the Xianju County Public Library was re-established. In February of the following year, the mobile teaching group was disbanded, the People's Education Institute was reinstated, and the county library was once again incorporated into the Book Department of the People's Education Institute, with its location relocated to the Confucian Temple.

In July 1949, the People's Liberation Army entered Xianju, and all staff of the Xianju County People's Education Institute resigned, resulting in the loss of books. In September of the same year, the remaining books and equipment were stored in the Confucian Temple, and the construction of a new library began. In August of the following year, the Xianju County People's Cultural Palace was established, with a library room collecting books. Subsequently, various systems gradually formed. In December 1952, the Xianju County People's Cultural Palace was renamed the Xianju County Cultural Palace. During the Cultural Revolution, library borrowing services were intermittent. In early 1967, the Xianju County Cultural Palace established a Cultural Revolution Group, which replaced the director in leading the work of the cultural palace. Within a year after July 1968, the county cultural palace did not have a formal leadership structure and was controlled by mass organizations. In 1972, the library room reopened, but was limited to reading Mao Zedong's quotations, works of Marx and Lenin, and revolutionary opera scripts. In the same year, the central government issued relevant documents, and the Xianju County Cultural Palace resumed the directorship system. Due to the situation, the director and the Revolutionary Leading Group of the Xianju County Education Bureau coexisted and took turns leading the work. In 1974, the Xianju County Cultural Palace invested 70,000 yuan to build a building, which was completed in 1976.

In April 1977, after the end of the Cultural Revolution, the library room of the Xianju County Cultural Palace moved into the main building of the county cultural palace, with over 310 square meters of space for activities. On August 1, 1978, the Xianju County Library was established. In April 1979, Wang Miyu was appointed as the first director; in May, it became an independent entity under the Xianju County Bureau of Culture and Education. After 1982, it became subordinate to the Xianju County Bureau of Culture. On June 30, 1984, the construction of the Xianju County Library building began. After completion in October 1986, it was opened to the public on New Year's Day the following year and has been in use ever since. In 1994, the Xianju County Library was rated as a national second-grade library, one of the first in the country.

On March 9, 2017, the Xianju County Library Council was established, and the first council meeting was held, electing Zhu Shoulong as the chairman. In 2018, with a total score of 988.5 points and ranking second in Taizhou, it was promoted to a national first-grade library assessed by the Ministry of Culture and Tourism. In May 2019, the construction of the Xianju County Urban Cultural Complex project began. The project is located east of the Xianju Party School, covering a total area of 47.48 mu and a total construction area of 70,400 square meters. The Xianju County Library will move into this project.

== Building ==
In August 1949, after the establishment of the library room of the Xianju County People's Cultural Palace, the next month saw the planning of a new library in the Confucian Temple. It consisted of two east wing rooms totaling 40 square meters, while ancient books were stored in three rooms upstairs totaling 50 square meters. The following year, the library room was relocated to the Wending Building, consisting of three rooms with a total area of 80 square meters (with ancient books still stored in the original location). In August 1951, the library room moved back to the Confucian Temple, with an additional south-facing bungalow of nearly 40 square meters. In June 1963, it moved to five bungalows on Xueqian Street, covering 75 square meters, offering lending and newspaper reading services to the public, and adding a "Youth Home" (which relocated to Chengguan Town -now in the area of Taiping Street- in 1965 and became the town cultural station). In 1964, some books were moved to the vicinity of the Xiaocai Market, renting two rooms totaling 40 square meters in a civilian house. In 1965, the library on Xueqian Street temporarily moved to three bungalows totaling 50 square meters in the west wing of the Xianju County Cultural Palace, but soon returned to Xueqian Street.

After the start of the Cultural Revolution in 1966, the library room was closed. In 1968, the library room's book depository moved to two rooms totaling 40 square meters at No. 212 Nanmen Street, with an additional room of 10 square meters. After the reopening of the library room in 1972, it moved back to the west wing of the county cultural palace, and ancient books were also moved to the county cultural palace in July and August, stored in the east wing. In 1973, the three bungalows in the south wing were expanded, with an area of 60 square meters. From summer 1975 to October 1976, the juvenile reading room opened at the entrance of Jiufang Lane, opposite a rented civilian house. From 1974 to 1975, a total of 70,000 yuan was allocated by the provincial and county governments of Zhejiang and Xianju to begin construction of the cultural palace building, which was completed in August 1976.

In April 1977, after the end of the Cultural Revolution, the library room moved into the cultural palace building. The ten small rooms on the west side of the third floor were used as book depositories, covering an area of nearly 150 square meters, while the six large rooms on the ground floor were used as reading rooms, with an area of 231 square meters. Among them, there was one lending library, two semi-open-shelf lending rooms, two reading rooms for newspapers, and one reference book depository. Ancient books were moved to the third floor of the building in the second half of 1977, occupying three rooms. After the formal establishment of the Xianju County Library in August 1978, the building remained at the original location for eight years. During this period, the independent library building started construction in June 1984, consisting of four rooms on four floors and three rooms on five floors, covering an area of 0.5 mu, with a construction area of 1440 square meters. The project was completed in October 1986, and it was put into use in January 1987. After the completion of the new building, the nine staff members worked overtime to move and decorate, saving the state more than 3,000 yuan in expenses. The building has been in use ever since. The original cultural palace building is now used as dormitories for some employees.

The area of the library building is among the lowest in the entire city of Taizhou, and the original building has long been unable to meet daily needs, so the library has been planning to build a new one. In December 2014, the design of the new building of Xianju County Library began, and the new building was located on the north side of the foot of Nanfeng Mountain, designed by the Landscape Design Institute of China Academy of Art. In May 2019, the construction of Xianju County Urban Cultural Complex project started, which is the first large-scale comprehensive public cultural infrastructure project in Taizhou City. The project is located on the east side of the Xianju Party School, at the junction of Yong'an Creek and Nanfeng Mountain, with a total land area of 47.48 mu and a total construction area of 70,400 square meters. The total investment of the project is about 636 million yuan, and the construction period is 3 years. Xianju County Library, Xianju County Museum, Xianju County Cultural Center, and Xianju Theater will all settle in the project. Among them, Xianju County Library has collection areas, reading areas, conference areas, etc. After the completion of the project, Xianju County Library will be able to store at least one million books, effectively alleviating the current shortage of seats and bookshelves.

=== Current building ===
The main building of Xianju County Library is located at No. 2 Jiefang Street, covering an area of 0.5 mu, with a main building area of 1440 square meters and a total area of 3725 square meters. The library is equipped with book lending room, newspaper reading room, children's room, electronic reading room, reception area, local books room, etc. There is also an academic lecture hall in the library, which is fully equipped and can accommodate more than 100 people.

Distribution of floors and opening hours of Xianju County Library
Fifth floor	Administrative offices	
Third floor	Local books room	Monday to Friday 8:00－11:30 14:30－17:30
Second floor	Children's room	8:30－17:30
Second floor	Room for book lending	8:30－20:30
Second floor	Collecting and editing room	
First floor	Le'an self-study room	8:00－20:30
First floor	Reading room for newspapers	8:00－11:30 14:30－17:30
First floor	Electronic reading room	

=== Overview ===
As of May 2019, Xianju County Library has built 18 township branch libraries, 8 HeHe Book Bars, 12 specialty branch libraries, and 8 academies. Among them, specialty branch libraries are set up in places such as community correction centers, PICC, and maternal and child health hospitals, selecting books with targeted content, such as medical and health books in maternal and child health hospital branch libraries, and will continue to build 4 to 5 in 2019.

Academies undertake the task of "inheriting and promoting local excellent culture" and have been recommended by the Xianju County Government as an important work. In May 2016, the "Xianju Academy Construction Plan" was specifically issued, clearly positioning the Xianju Academy as "a new type of cultural work carrier integrating traditional cultural education and modern humanities education." The academy has received support from the masses and various departments, and has had a positive impact. Xianju County Library also has a large mobile library, which regularly delivers books, exhibitions, and lectures to remote areas, providing services to people in remote areas. The collections of all branch libraries can be borrowed and returned throughout the county, achieving "one-card access" even in other branch libraries.

== Library affairs ==
=== Overview ===
Xianju County Library is a subordinate unit of the Bureau of Culture, Radio, Television, Tourism, and Sports of Xianju County, which budgeted 5.15 million yuan for the library in 2019, mainly used for personnel salaries and book purchases. The library has 11 formal positions, with 8 current permanent staff as of April 2019. As of April 2019, Jiang Zhien was the director of Xianju County Library. The mission of Xianju County Library is to "improve the quality of citizens and create a literary Xianju"; the vision is to "build Xianju County Library into a first-grade county-level library in China".

In 2017, Xianju County Library had an annual circulation of 772,000 volumes and received more than 1.39 million visitors annually. As of May 2017, Xianju County Library had issued 21,466 library cards.

=== Collection and borrowing information ===
As of July 2018, Xianju County Library had a total collection of 811,314 volumes (including 172,000 volumes in rural cultural auditoriums). As of 2017, Xianju County Library had a collection of 714,109 volumes of books, 18,300 periodicals, and more than 6,000 local documents. The library also has a set of reprints of "Siku Quanshu", as well as "Republic Series" and 16 sets of rare edition reference books, which are the "treasures" of Xianju County Library.

Previously, to apply for a library card at Xianju County Library, a deposit of 100 yuan was required. Starting from March 2018, residents of Xianju obtained library cards for free at the main library or branch libraries by presenting their Citizen Card, with the same privileges as regular library cards. Each cardholder can borrow up to 5 books for a period of one month, with an extension of 15 days allowed once.

=== Digital services ===
Xianju County Library organizes professional personnel to digitize local chronicles such as "Xianju County Chronicles" and "Guangxu Xianju County Chronicles", processing them digitally through information technology so that readers can read them online without the need for physical books. Xianju County Library was the first in Zhejiang Province to initiate database project construction. Currently, it has built 8 databases including "Xianju Historical and Humanistic Map", "Xianju Lantern Database", "Xianju Colored Stone Inlay Database", "Xianju Folk Embroidery Art Database", "Millennium Ancient Town—Potan History of Changes", "Xianju Memory Database", "Xianju County Library Microenterprise Think Tank", and "Xianju County Special Literature Library", with a total digital resource volume of 6.63 TB.

The library has also launched the "Xianju County Digital Library" service platform, providing access to 420 million Chinese and foreign literature information and 3.3 million book catalog information through the Zhejiang Digital Library platform. The digital library also contains local documents and special books from Xianju County, making it, according to Library Director Jiang Zhien, "the first in Taizhou". In addition to the above digital resources, Xianju County Library also has access to Fangzheng Apabi digital books, Tsinghua Tongfang full-text journals, papers, newspaper databases, the National Cultural Information Resource Sharing Platform, Longyuan journals, and Weipu Chinese science and technology journals. Readers can search for resources in the electronic reading room on the first floor of the library, with only an internet fee of 1 yuan per hour charged.

In terms of offline equipment, Xianju County Library and some branch libraries support borrowing books and entering the library using mobile phone QR codes, as well as self-service card issuance through card issuance machines.

=== Activities ===
Xianju County Library organizes public lectures called "Xianju Story Collection", which are based on local culture and history, sparking a local cultural trend in Xianju County. Xianju County Library has also held activities such as "Celebrating the New Year with Literary Joy", "Exhibition of the Public Library Law", and a Spring Equinox Poetry Meeting, as well as lantern riddle guessing activities on Lantern Festival both online and offline via WeChat public accounts.
