= Yongjia County =

Yongjia 永嘉县 Yungkia
- County
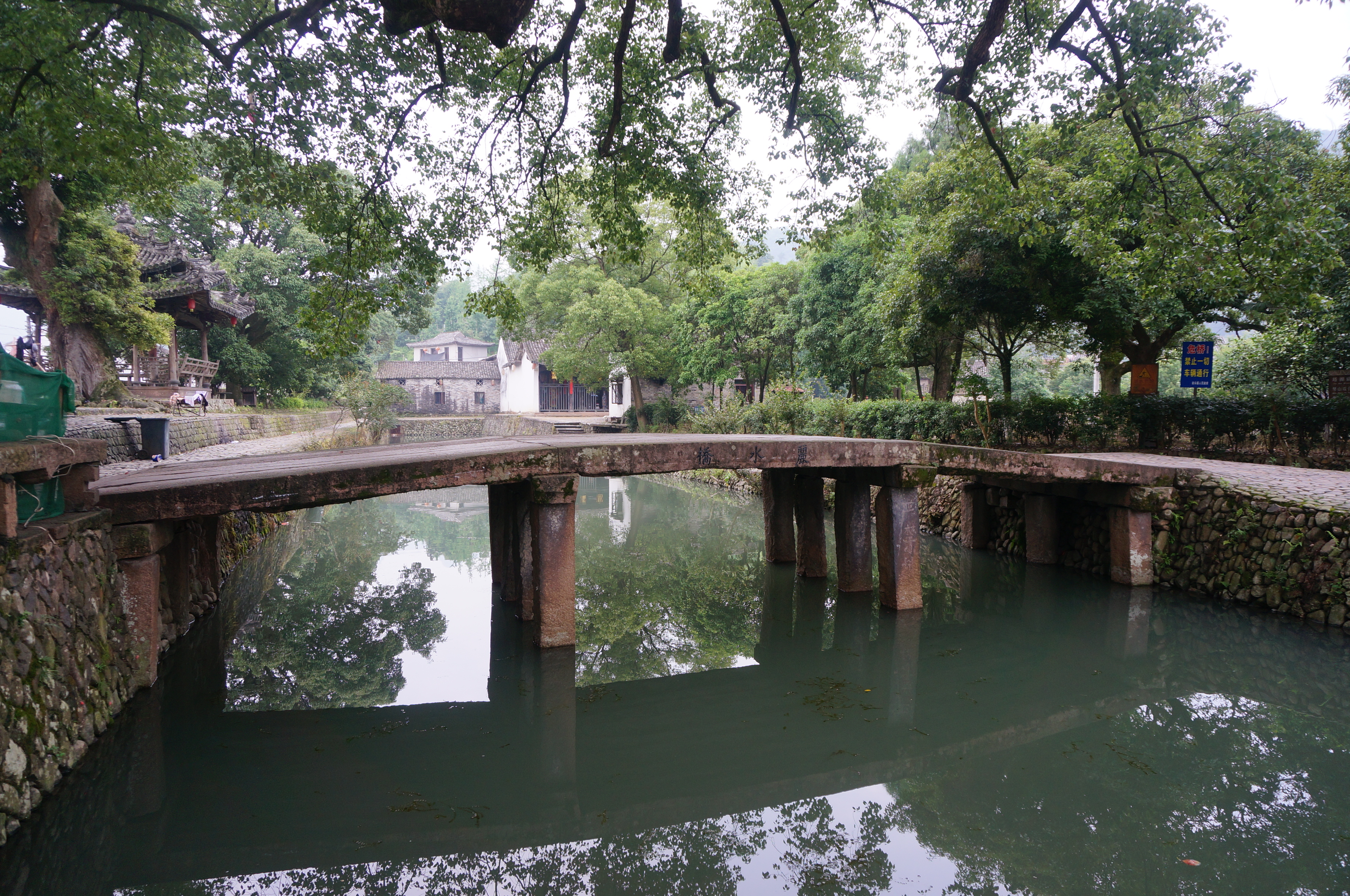

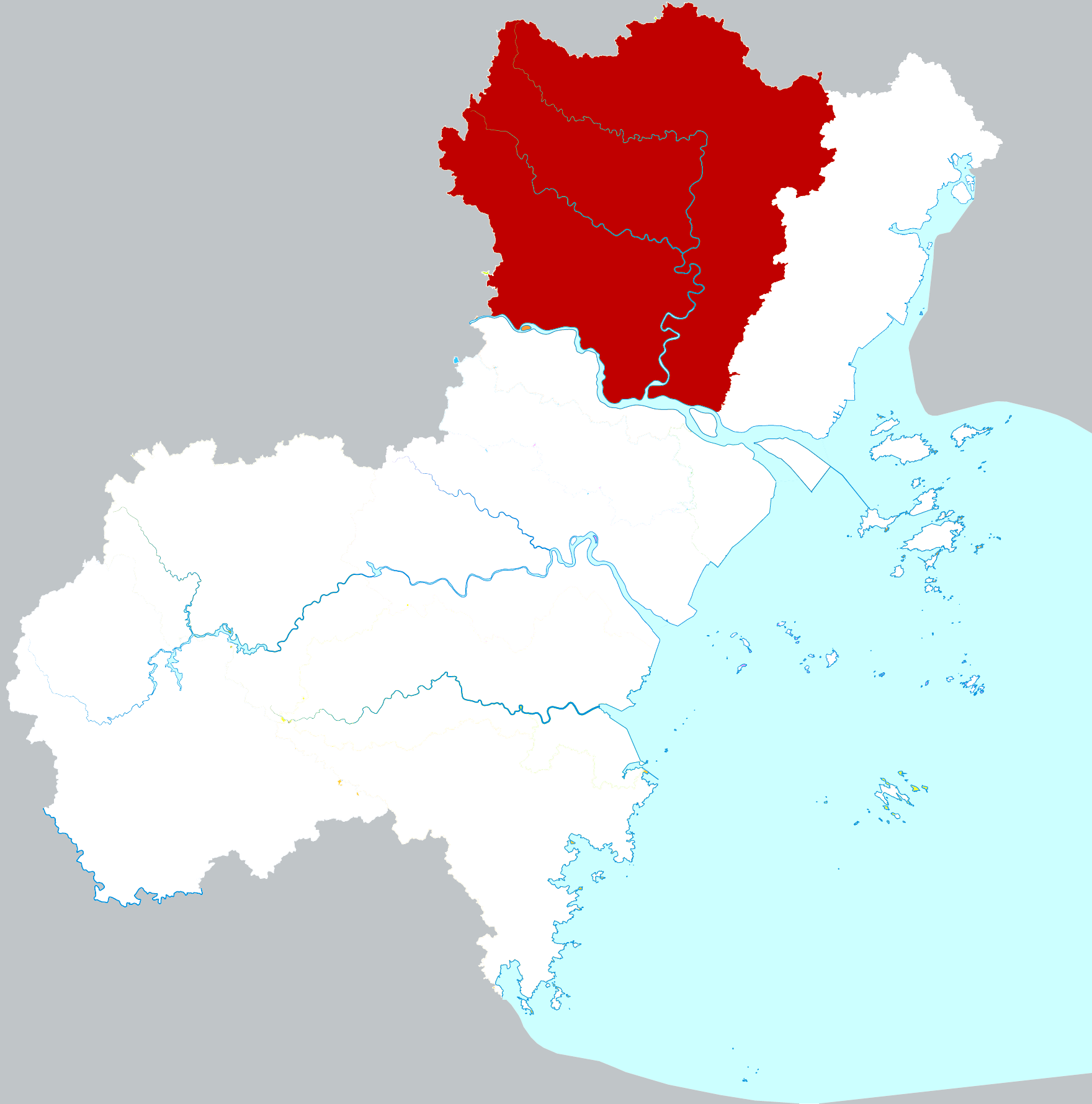
- Location of Yongjia County within Wenzhou

- Location of the seat in Zhejiang
- Coordinates: 28°09′14″N 120°41′29″E
- Country: People's Republic of China
- Province: Zhejiang
- Prefecture-level city: Wenzhou
- Township-level divisions: 8 subdistricts, 10 towns

Area
  - Total: 2,698 km^{2} (1,042 sq mi)
- Elevation: 39 m (128 ft)

Population (2007)
  - Total: 886,300
  - Density: 328.5/km^{2} (850.8/sq mi)
- Time zone: UTC+8 (China Standard)
- Postal code: 325100
- Area code: 0577
- Website: http://yongjia.org.cn

Yongjia County (simplified Chinese: 永嘉县; traditional Chinese: 永嘉縣; pinyin: Yǒngjiā Xiàn; Wenzhou dialect: yon^{2}ko^{1}/ yu^{3} ion ko) is a county in Wenzhou in the southeast of Zhejiang province, People's Republic of China, located 15 kilometres (9.3 mi) north of the city proper of Wenzhou city, which administers the county. The Nanxi River Scenic Area is located within this county, and the river has been nominated on the tentative list of UNESCO World Heritage Sites.

== Administrative divisions ==
Subdistricts of the Shangtang Administrative Committee (上塘管委会):

- Beicheng Subdistrict (北城街道), Dongcheng Subdistrict (东城街道), Nancheng Subdistrict (南城街道)

Subdistricts of the Oubei Administrative Committee (瓯北管委会):

- Dong'ou Subdistrict (东瓯街道), Jiangbei Subdistrict (江北街道), Huangtian Subdistrict (黄田街道), Sanjiang Subdistrict (三江街道), Wuniu Subdistrict (乌牛街道)

Towns:

- Qiaotou (桥头镇), Qiaoxia (桥下镇), Shatou (沙头镇), Bilian (碧莲镇), Xunzhai (巽宅镇), Yantou (岩头镇), Fenglin (枫林镇), Yantan (岩坦镇), Daruoyan (大箬岩镇), Hesheng (鹤盛镇)

== Climate ==
Climate data for Yongjia, elevation 34 m (112 ft), (1991–2020 normals, extremes 1981–present)
Month	Jan	Feb	Mar	Apr	May	Jun	Jul	Aug	Sep	Oct	Nov	Dec	Year
Record high °C (°F)	24.9 (76.8)	29.0 (84.2)	30.8 (87.4)	34.5 (94.1)	36.8 (98.2)	38.9 (102.0)	42.9 (109.2)	39.4 (102.9)	40.5 (104.9)	36.6 (97.9)	30.8 (87.4)	26.0 (78.8)	42.9 (109.2)
Mean daily maximum °C (°F)	13.2 (55.8)	14.7 (58.5)	17.8 (64.0)	23.0 (73.4)	27.1 (80.8)	30.0 (86.0)	34.2 (93.6)	33.7 (92.7)	30.6 (87.1)	26.4 (79.5)	21.1 (70.0)	15.9 (60.6)	24.0 (75.2)
Daily mean °C (°F)	8.5 (47.3)	9.7 (49.5)	12.6 (54.7)	17.5 (63.5)	22.0 (71.6)	25.5 (77.9)	28.9 (84.0)	28.5 (83.3)	25.6 (78.1)	20.9 (69.6)	16.0 (60.8)	10.6 (51.1)	18.9 (66.0)
Mean daily minimum °C (°F)	5.3 (41.5)	6.4 (43.5)	9.3 (48.7)	13.8 (56.8)	18.5 (65.3)	22.3 (72.1)	25.2 (77.4)	25.0 (77.0)	22.1 (71.8)	17.0 (62.6)	12.5 (54.5)	7.0 (44.6)	15.4 (59.7)
Record low °C (°F)	−3.6 (25.5)	−3.0 (26.6)	−1.7 (28.9)	3.6 (38.5)	9.2 (48.6)	13.7 (56.7)	18.4 (65.1)	19.4 (66.9)	14.0 (57.2)	6.0 (42.8)	1.3 (34.3)	−4.8 (23.4)	−4.8 (23.4)
Average precipitation mm (inches)	61.2 (2.41)	80.2 (3.16)	144.5 (5.69)	137.6 (5.42)	168.8 (6.65)	270.6 (10.65)	193.2 (7.61)	291.7 (11.48)	189.2 (7.45)	71.1 (2.80)	71.6 (2.82)	56.9 (2.24)	1,736.6 (68.38)
Average precipitation days (≥ 0.1 mm)	12.2	13.6	17.8	16.4	16.9	18.6	14.4	17.3	12.7	8.0	10.5	10.2	168.6
Average snowy days	1.3	1.1	0.3	0	0	0	0	0	0	0	0	0.4	3.1
Average relative humidity (%)	73	75	77	77	78	83	78	79	76	72	74	72	76
Mean monthly sunshine hours	99.9	95.7	109.2	132.1	135.2	122.5	216.3	206.1	165.6	165.6	122.1	118.7	1,689
Percentage possible sunshine	30	30	29	34	32	30	51	51	45	47	38	37	38
Source: China Meteorological Administrationall-time extreme temperatureall-time May low

== Transport ==
- Wenzhou North railway station (Under renovation)
