= Bita (name) =

- Pronunciation: BeeTa (Bita)
- Gender: female

Origin
- Origin: Persian
- Meaning: Unique، Unrivaled
- Region of origin: Persia

Bita (بیتا) is both a surname and a female given name. Bita in Persian means "unique" or "exclusive." It is derived from the Old Persian word "bita," signifying "only" or "sole."

== People with the given name Bita ==
- Bita (footballer), full name Silvio Tasso Lasalvia (1942–1992), Brazilian football forward
- Bita Daryabari (born 1969), Iranian-American philanthropist, entrepreneur and computer scientist
- Bita Elahian, Iranian-American filmmaker and actress
- Bita Farrahi (1959–2023), Iranian actress
- Bita Fayyazi (born 1962), Iranian sculptor
- Bita Ghezelayagh (born 1966), Italian-Iranian visual artist
- Bita Moghaddam, Iranian-American neuroscientist and author
- Bita Razavi (born 1983), Iranian-born contemporary visual artist

== People with the surname Bita ==
- Gheorghe Biță (born 1963) Romanian footballer
- Junior Bita (born 2005) Equatoguinean–Spanish footballer
- László Bita (born 1967) Hungarian football player
- Lili Bita, or Lili Bita Zaller, Greek-American writer

== See also ==
- Arthur Si-Bita (1948–2016), Cameroonian film director
