= Bita =

Bita may refer to:

== People ==
- Bita (name)

== Places and jurisdictions ==
- Bita (Africa), an Ancient city, former bishopric and Latin Catholic titular see in Roman North Africa
- Bita, an Archaic name for the Latin Catholic titular see of Bida (North Africa)
- Bita, a village in the municipality of Reci, Covasna County, Romania
- Bita (woreda), a region in Ethiopia
- 1596 name of Abtaa, Syria

== Other uses ==
- Bita Lake in Pudacuo National Park, China
