= New York Film Academy =

Private film and acting school in the US

Coordinates: 40.736478°N 73.988972°W

New York Film Academy (NYFA)
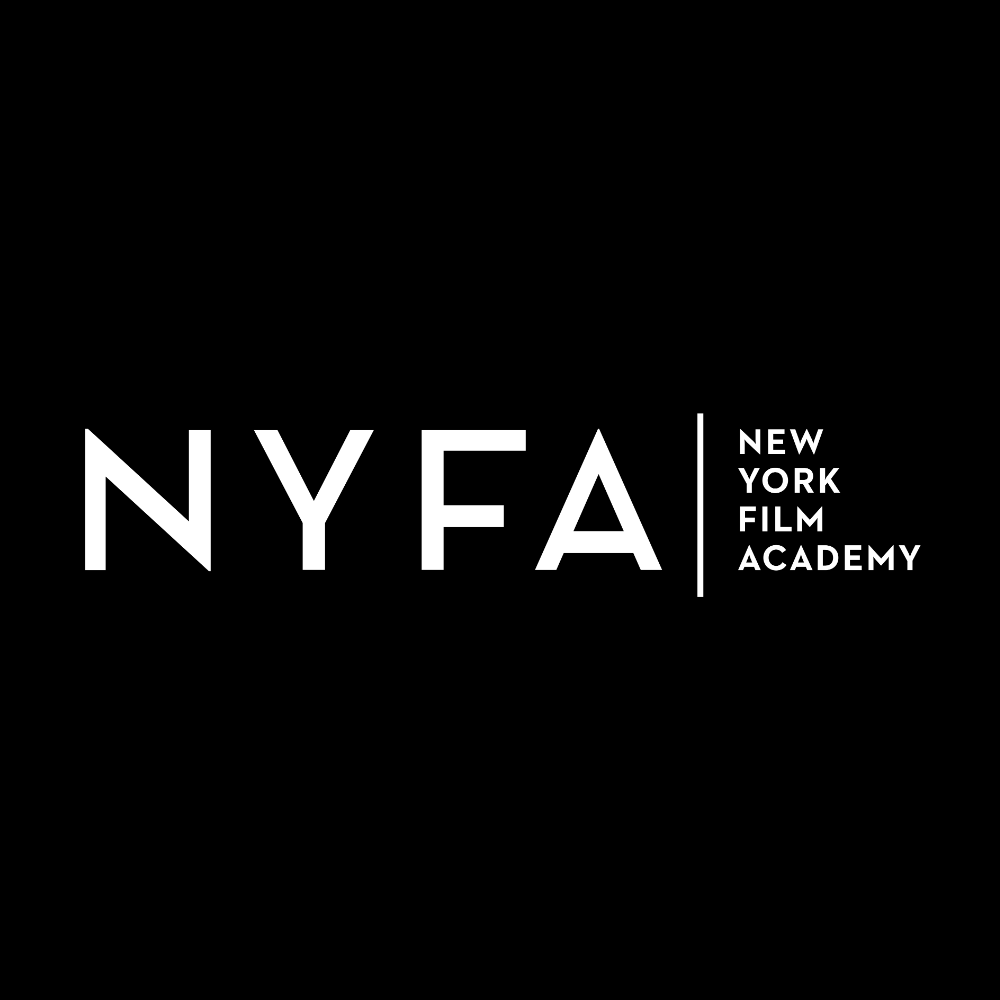
- College of Visual and Performings Arts
- Other name: NYFA
- Motto: The most hands-on intensive programs in the world
- Type: Private for-profit film school and acting school
- Established: 1992
- President: Michael J. Young
- Academic staff: 400+
- Students: 5,000 per year
- Location: New York City, New York
- Campus: New York City, New York; Los Angeles, California; South Beach, Florida; Gold Coast, Australia; Florence, Italy
- Other campuses: Paris, France; Moscow, Russia; Beijing, China; Shanghai, China; Almaty, Kazakhstan
- Colors: Black, White, Cyan, Magenta, Yellow
- Website: nyfa.edu

New York Film Academy – School of Film and Acting (NYFA) is a private for-profit film school and acting school based in New York City, Los Angeles, and Miami.

As of 2012, the school had 400+ employees and over 5,000 students per year (many of them from outside the United States). NYFA offers master, bachelor, and associate degrees, as well as one- and two-year conservatory programs, short-term workshops, and youth programs and summer camps.

== History ==
The New York Film Academy was founded in 1992 by Jerry Sherlock, a former film, television and theater producer. It was originally located at the Tribeca Film Center. In 1994, NYFA moved to 100 East 17th Street, the former Tammany Hall building in the Union Square. In October 2015, after 23 years of occupancy, the academy relocated from Tammany Hall to 17 Battery Place.

== Academics ==
NYFA offers undergraduate and graduate degree programs, certificates, and workshops. It is accredited by the WASC Senior College and University Commission.

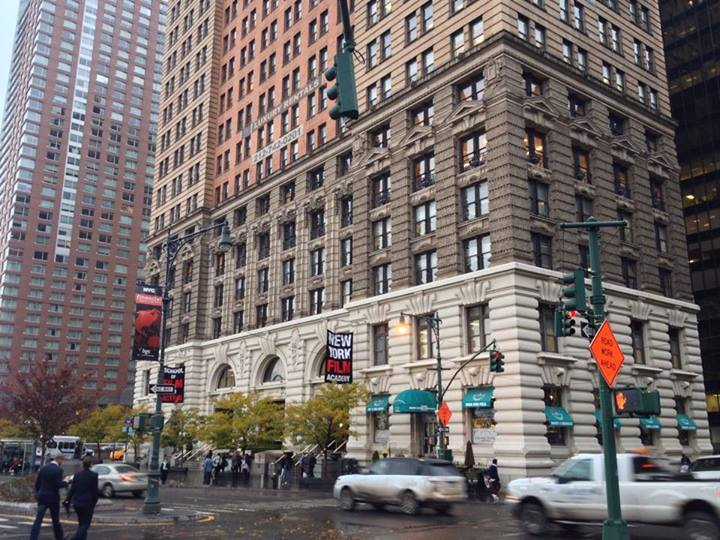
New York Film Academy branch located in the Whitehall Building in Downtown Manhattan near Battery Park

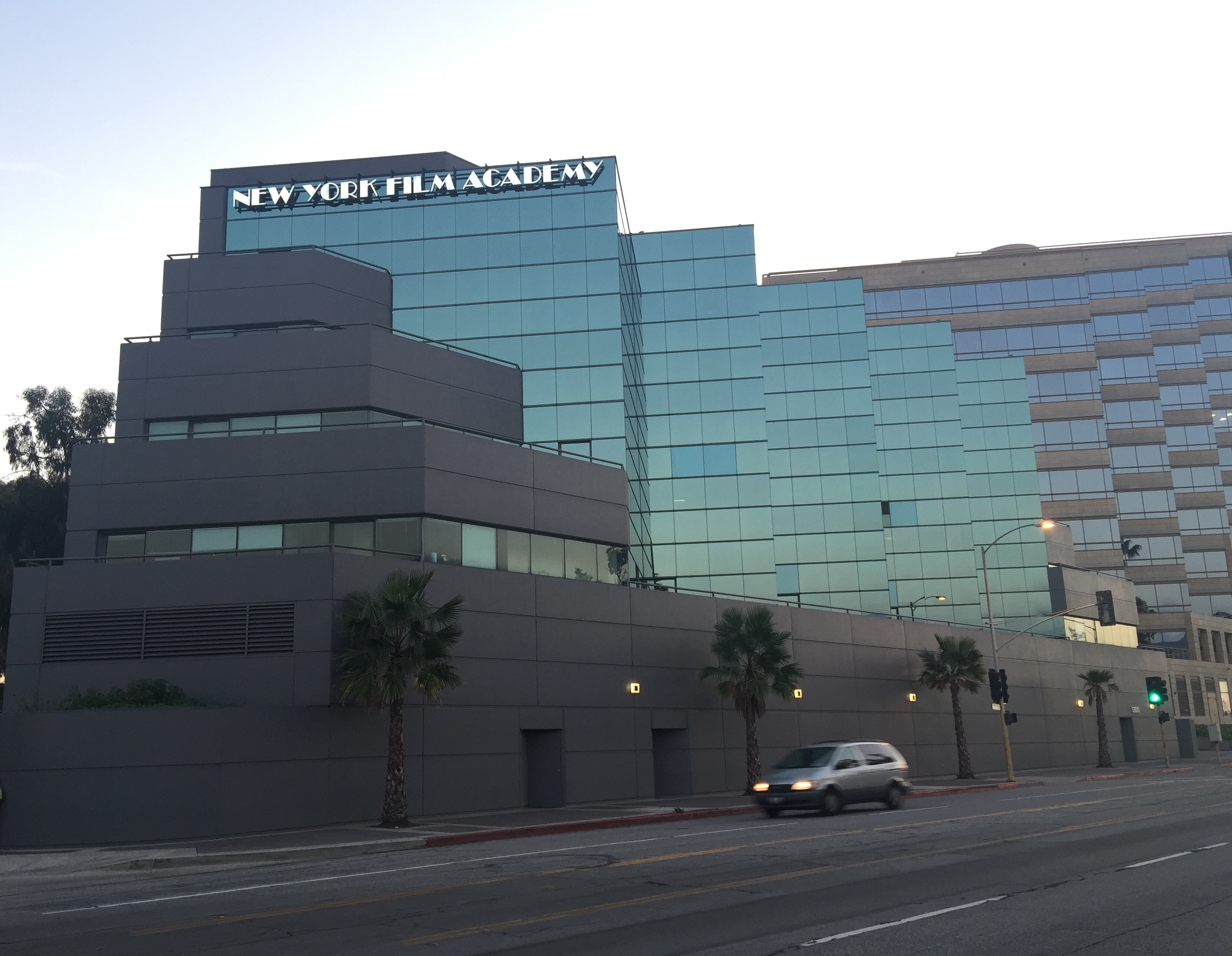
New York Film Academy: College of Visual and Performing Arts located in Burbank, California, next to Warner Brothers

NYFA's disciplines of study include filmmaking, Producing, Screenwriting, Cinematography, Digital editing, Documentary Filmmaking, Acting for Film, 3D Animation and Visual Effects, Entertainment Media, Photography, Game Design, Musical Theater and Virtual Reality, as well as an English as a second language program that aims to combine traditional language learning with activities related to the arts. In 2007, NYFA partnered with NBC News to start a program in Broadcast Journalism. In 2010 the contract between NYFA and NBC expired, but the broadcast journalism programs at NYFA continue to be offered by many of the original faculty. NYFA degree programs, workshops, and short-term courses are held around the world. Summer workshops are offered at Harvard University. International locations include Australia, Florence, Paris, Kazakhstan, Beijing, and Shanghai. Other international locations are offered at various times of the year.

== Partnerships ==
Since 2007, NYFA has collaborated with museums and major art institutions to organize cultural and filmmaking education initiatives for teens and young adults. Since 2010, the New York Film Academy has partnered with the Metropolitan Museum of Art. Working closely with each individual institution, the Film Academy contributes resources in curriculum development, teaching staff, and equipment to deliver programs that teach students the creative art of the moving image, as well as the importance and value of all forms of art and the institutions that preserve, protect and display them. The partnering institutions include:

- Brooklyn Museum, 2007
- Whitney Museum, 2009
- Metropolitan Museum of Art, 2010–current
- In 2014, NASA and the New York Film Academy announced a new initiative that would enlist students to create original audiovisual materials to raise awareness about the development of the James Webb Space Telescope as part of the academy's STEAM initiative.
- The New York Film Academy offered a series of ongoing REDucation Workshops in partnership with RED Digital Cinema Camera Company.
- 10 ARTS Foundation

NYFA founded 10 ARTS Foundation, a nonprofit organization that offers scholarship and funding opportunities for storytellers. The public can volunteer with the organization, donate to a program or educational project.

10 ARTS has NYFA Alliances with National Geographic, The Met, BAFTA, NASA, Variety, The Hollywood Reporter, The Writers Guild Foundation, Warner Brothers, USAID, National Coalition Against Censorshop, The Hilaria & Alec Baldwin Foundation, USO, TEDx, MultiChoice, Alexandra Skiba Memorial Scholarship, Tribeca Film Festival, AT&T, New York Public Library, Inter-American Development Bank, and Fulbright.

== Notable faculty ==
NYFA draws faculty who are active, working professionals in their fields, many of whom are award winners or have formerly taught at such prestigious institutions as Tisch School of the Arts, Columbia University, AFI Conservatory, University of Southern California, Stanford University, Harvard University, Yale University and University of California, Los Angeles.

Notable faculty members have included SAG Award-winning actor Matthew Modine, BAFTA Award-winning cinematographer Anthony B. Richmond BSC, ASC, actor Bill Duke, writer Heather Hach, director Nag Ashwin, actress Brenda Vaccaro, actor Louis Gossett Jr., actress and musical theater performer Kristy Cates, director Adam Nimoy, game designer Chris Swain, screenwriter Jim Jennewein, actress Lynda Goodfriend, and actor/director Michael Zelniker.

== Notable alumni ==
- Adinia Wirasti, actress
- Adrian Voo, actor
- Akkineni Naga Chaitanya, actor and producer
- Alanna Masterson, actress
- Alaya Furniturewala, actress
- Alberto Frezza, actor
- Alex Asogwa, actress, model, film director, producer and anti-bullying activist
- Alfonso Perugini, actor and film director
- Alfonso Ribeiro, actor
- Amanda Du-Pont, actress
- Andrew Bachelor, actor and internet personality
- Angela Ismailos, director
- Anouar H. Smaine - film director, producer, writer, and actor
- Antonio Chavez Trejo, filmmaker, writer, producer and entrepreneur
- Arjumand Rahim, actress
- Athiya Shetty, actress
- Aubrey Plaza, actress
- Avinash Tiwary, actor
- Banky Wellington, rapper and actor
- Bevin Prince, actor
- Bill Hader, actor and screenwriter
- Bita Elahian, actress and filmmaker
- Brittany Andrews, actress, model, and filmmaker
- Camilla Luddington, actress
- Carter Smith, director and photographer
- Chad Duell, actor
- Chika Anadu, director and screenwriter
- Chord Overstreet, actor
- Curry Barker, filmmaker and YouTuber
- Damon Wayans, actor and comedian
- Damon Wayans, Jr., actor and comedian
- D. B. Woodside, actor
- Drama Del Rosario, documentarian
- Eamonn Walker, actor
- Elyfer Torres, actor
- Emi Ikehata, actress
- Eve Hewson, actress
- Francesco Panzieri, visual effects artist
- Gauri Shinde, Director
- Gerald McMorrow, writer and director
- Gino M. Santos, director and producer
- Giorgio Pasotti, actor
- Greg DeLiso, director
- Hannah Lux Davis, director
- Hannah Quinlivan, actress and model
- Hayden Szeto, actor
- Imran Khan, actor
- Issa Rae, creator
- Iftikhar Thakur, Punjabi actor
- Ibrahim Ali Khan (actor)
- James Friend, cinematographer
- Janek Ambros, director and producer
- Jason Shah, actor
- Jean de Meuron, writer, director and producer
- Lal Jr., director and screenwriter
- Jessica Lee Rose, actress
- Jonathan Morgan Heit, actor
- Joshua Leonard, actor
- Julie Tan, actress
- Justine Wachsberger, actor
- Kangana Ranaut, actress
- Kemi Adesoye, screenwriter
- Kendall Ciesemier, reporter and producer
- Khushi Kapoor, actress
- Kira Hagi, actress
- Kushal Tandon, model and actor
- Lana Condor, actress
- Lea Gabrielle, journalist
- Lio Tipton, model and actress
- Luv Ranjan, producer, screenwriter, and director
- Mahsa Saeidi-Azcuy, participant on The Apprentice
- Mainak Bhaumik, Documentary filmmaker, Film Editor, Bengali Filmmaker.
- Maisa Silva, actor and TV presenter
- Manuel Garcia-Rulfo, actor
- Mariano Di Vaio, actor
- Mariyah Moten, model and pageant queen
- Masali Baduza, actress
- Matty Cardarople, actor
- Mike Pohjola, screenwriter, playwright, novelist
- Mohamed Diab, director and screenwriter
- Nag Ashwin, director
- Nara Rohit, actor
- Natasha Thahane, actress
- Naya Rivera, actress
- Neil Forsyth, screenwriter
- Niharica Raizada, actress
- OC Ukeje, actor
- Omoni Oboli, actress, director, producer, and writer
- Oshri Cohen, actor
- Oskar Kuchera, actor, TV presenter, and radio host
- Paul Dano, actor
- Pevita Pearce, actress
- Philip Dorling, screenwriter
- Rafael de la Fuente, actor
- Ragga Ragnars, actress
- Rah Digga, actress and rapper
- Raphaela Neihausen, producer
- Rekha Rana, actress
- Rob Margolies, writer and director
- Rohit Gupta, director
- Ronen Rubinstein, actor
- Sasha Cohen, actress and figure skater
- Sean Robinson, film director and editor
- Shahad Ameen, film director and scriptwriter
- Shaquille O'Neal, basketball player and actor
- Sharad Malhotra, actor
- Shehzad Sheikh, actor
- Shirley Setia, singer and actress
- Somy Ali, actress
- Stephanie Cayo, actress
- Stephanie Okereke Linus, actress
- Tharun Bhascker Dhaassyam, director
- Tracy Oliver, writer, producer, and actor
- Trevor Matthews, producer and actor
- Tushar Tyagi, director
- Vittoria Chierici, artist
