= Christopher de Bellaigue =

British author and journalist

Christopher George Lowther de Bellaigue de Bughas (born 23 September 1971 in London) is a British author and journalist who is known for his long-form reporting and works of history.

De Bellaigue was formerly the correspondent for The Economist in Turkey and Iran. He also covered the invasions of Afghanistan and Iraq for, among others, the New York Review of Books, Granta, The New Yorker, the London Review of Books, and Harper’s Magazine.

Since returning to the UK in 2007, he has written several books and held fellowships at the universities of Oxford, Harvard and St Andrews. In 2024 he founded the Lake District Book Festival.

== Biography ==
De Bellaigue is the second son of Sylvia Rodney (1930–1985), daughter of George Rodney, eighth Baron Rodney, and Lady Marjorie Lowther, daughter of the sixth Earl of Lonsdale, and of Eric de Bellaigue de Bughas, son of Vicomte Pierre de Bellaigue de Bughas, a decorated officer in the Free French Forces of General Charles de Gaulle, and Marie-Antoinette Willemin, who taught French and French literature to the Princesses Elizabeth and Margaret. His uncle, the art historian Sir Geoffrey de Bellaigue (1931–2013), was Director of the Royal Collection.

De Bellaigue attended Eton College from 1985 to 1989 and went on to read Hindi and Persian at Fitzwilliam College, Cambridge, graduating in 1995. In 2000, he married Bita Ghezelayagh, an Iranian artist and architect, in Tehran. They have two children.

== Career ==
=== Journalism ===
After graduating, de Bellaigue moved to New Delhi where he worked as a staff writer for the news magazine India Today, going under cover for his first article to expose the illegal sale of Indian architectural artefacts to foreign collectors. In 1996 he became the Economist's correspondent in Turkey and moved to Ankara. In 2000 de Bellaigue moved to Iran as the Economist's correspondent, also covering the US invasions of Afghanistan and Iraq and their aftermath. Dismayed by the Economist's support for the invasion of Iraq, which he had opposed, in 2005 he quit the magazine and in 2007 he returned to the UK to take up the Alistair Horne Fellowship at St Antony's College, Oxford, before moving to London in 2008.

De Bellaigue has continued to travel on journalistic assignments. In the summer of 2009 he was one of a small number of western journalists who reported from Iran for the duration of the Green Movement, in this case for the New Yorker, Harper's and Prospect. In 2009 he made the television documentary Iran and Britain, a joint production by BBC Four and BBC Persian, and following the 2011 Arab Spring he made radio programmes for the BBC World Service from Egypt and Tunisia. In 2013 de Bellaigue's Harper's article on cockfighting in Afghanistan, Caliph of the Tricksters, was included in The Best American Travel Writing anthology. In 2015 his Guardian Long Read about being a tour guide in Iran, It’s Not Like Argo, won him a Foreign Press Association award. In 2019 the Guardian created a dedicated webpage for reader responses to his Long Read on assisted dying in the Netherlands, with four specialists in palliative care and intellectual disability declaring it to be ‘excellent’ while Molly Meacher, a crossbench peer in Britain's House of Lords, accused de Bellaigue of ‘conflating’ euthanasia with suicide. De Bellaigue has reported at length on Turkish politics, the Kurdish cause, radicalisation inside French jails, rewilding, overtourism and the politics of Brazil, while continuing to review books on subjects ranging from climate change to Indian history for the New York Review of Books.

=== Books (1): Islam and the Middle East ===
==== The Golden Throne: The Curse of a King, forthcoming ====
The second instalment of de Bellaigue's trilogy about the Ottoman Sultan Suleyman the Magnificent appears on 6 March 2025 and takes the story from 1536 to 1553.

I love history but recently my patience for history books has worn thin — the besetting sin is an excess of dates jostling with an army of names and a bloat of research. Reading The Golden Throne...by Christopher de Bellaigue has been a joy, though. It focuses on Suleyman the Magnificent, the Ottoman emperor, in his years of pomp in the 16th century. Written in the present tense, with novelistic flair, we get a ringside seat of diplomatic maneuvering, sea battles against the Holy League and peek inside his harem...It’s a sequel to The Lion House, which covered Suleyman’s earlier years in power. I’m in awe of de Bellaigue’s imagination and skill in distilling a huge amount of research into a witty, fleet-footed narrative.

- Robbie Millen, Literary Editor, the Times and the Sunday Times

==== The Lion House: The Coming of a King, 2022 ====
The first instalment of de Bellaigue's Suleyman trilogy follows the story of the Sultan's life and times from his birth in the 1490s to 1536. Applauding de Bellaigue's innovative style, Dominic Sandbrook described it as ‘the most daring history book of the year,’ while Elif Shafak wrote, ‘there are books that enlarge the mind, there are books that enrich the soul, but rarely comes a book so beautifully written and profound that it manages to do both.’ The Lion House was named a book of the year by the Times, Sunday Times, the New Yorker, the Spectator and the Independent.

==== The Islamic Enlightenment: The Struggle between Faith and Reason, 1798 to Modern Times, 2017 ====
The Islamic Enlightenment tells the story of the entry of modern ideas into Egypt, Turkey and Iran in the nineteenth century and their rejection (the ‘Counter-Enlightenment’) in reaction to European colonialism in the twentieth. The Islamic Enlightenment was shortlisted for the Baillie Gifford, Orwell and Nayef al-Rodhan prizes and named a book of the year by the Sunday Times, the Times Literary Supplement and the Wall Street Journal. Writing in the Journal, Bartle Bull called the book ‘excellent … Mr. de Bellaigue, the finest Orientalist of his generation, does the world a great service by charting the attainments of the region’s long nineteenth century … a story that is at once new, fascinating and extraordinarily important.’

==== Patriot of Persia: Muhammad Mossadegh and a Tragic Anglo-American Coup, 2012 ====
Patriot of Persia is a biography of Muhammad Mossadegh, the Iranian prime minister who engineered the nationalisation of the Anglo-Iranian Oil Company in 1951 and was overthrown two years later in a coup devised by MI6 and carried out by the CIA.

‘Few foreign interventions in the Middle East have been as ignoble as the coup of 1953,’ de Bellaigue wrote, ‘and few Middle Eastern leaders have less deserved our hostility than Muhammad Mossadegh.' (p. 273) Patriot of Persia won the Washington Institute Prize and was described in the Times Literary Supplement as ‘unsurpassed as a rounded portrait of Mossadegh’.

==== Rebel Land: Unravelling the Riddle of History in a Turkish Town, 2009 ====
Based on research that de Bellaigue conducted over two years in Varto, a small town in eastern Turkey, Rebel Land begins with a story of his essay published in the New York Review of Books, whose allusion to the Armenian genocide prompted a letter from the Harvard Professor James R. Russell accusing the author of promoting denialist views, as well as criticism from the magazine's editor Robert Silvers.

Dismayed to realise that he had received his information on these events only from Turkish and pro-Turkish writers, de Bellaigue set out to find out the truth through his own research, endeavouring also to tell the story of modern Turkey through one of its most contested regions. Rebel Land was shortlisted for the Orwell Prize while the Los Angeles Times review described de Bellaigue as ‘a lovely writer, thorough reporter, and deep thinker.’

==== The Struggle for Iran, 2007 ====
De Bellaigue's second book, The Struggle for Iran is a collection of his essays.

==== In the Rose Garden of the Martyrs: a Memoir of Iran, 2005 ====
Based on his observations and research while living in Iran, In the Rose Garden of the Martyrs was among the first books in English to contain testimony by veterans of the Iran-Iraq War, going on to detail the evolution of the revolutionary state and Iranian society from the perspective of a Persian-speaking foreigner living in the country.

In the New York Times Book Review Pico Iyer described the book as ‘a stylish and arresting debut … [In the Rose Garden of the Martyrs] pitches us into the very hearts and streets of the Iranian revolution today.’ The book was shortlisted for the Royal Society of Literature's Ondaatje Prize.

=== Books (2): Technology and the Environment ===
==== The Future of Farming, forthcoming ====
Research for this book took de Bellaigue to Brazil in 2024 and will take him to India and Africa in 2025. In it de Bellaigue examines the relationship between food, population and environmental breakdown, highlighting the most sustainable farming practices in the world and the most destructive.

==== Flying Green: On the Frontiers of New Aviation, 2023 ====
Research for this short book for Columbia Global Reports led de Bellaigue to chart the various routes to sustainable or green aviation, travelling around Europe and the United States researching biofuels, synthetic or e-fuels, fully electric aviation and hydrogen-powered aircraft. Arguing that aviation is a cossetted industry with an unhealthily close relationship with government, de Bellaigue concluded that ‘it’s not technology that’s holding up the decarbonisation of aviation. It’s money … aviation needs to lose its status as an entitled exception. Pound for pound, flight for flight, it’s a massive and growing problem and it needs to pay its way.’

In the Financial Times Pilita Clark praised Flying Green, writing that de Bellaigue's ‘reporting is far more engaging than conventional accounts of efforts to make flying safer for the planet.’

=== Writing about Sylvia de Bellaigue's suicide ===
In 1985, when he was 13, de Bellaigue's mother committed suicide. In 2018, more than thirty years later, de Bellaigue began addressing the subject in his work, first in the form of a BBC radio documentary about his aunt, Diana Rodney, who had helped him through his grief, and, more obliquely, in his Guardian Long Read about assisted dying.

In 2020 the London Review of Books published his Diary piece. which he wrote of her death, the silence that surrounded it in his family and the strategies he employed to expunge the trauma. ‘No one actually told me my mother had committed suicide,’ de Bellaigue wrote of his teenage self. ‘That information was never volunteered. In order to find out how she died I put the limited data at my disposal through the sieve of my mind, and suicide came out … to be quite sure I ended up asking someone a year after her death. Perhaps two years. With his nod a block of my life slipped smoothly into a channel that had been planed and grooved for it. It is impossible for me to imagine life without this reality."

=== Documentaries ===
- Iran and Britain (BBC Four and BBC Persian), February 2009
- A Life Alone (BBC World Service), October 2018

== The Lake District Book Festival ==
In 2024, along with Charlotte Fairbairn, a novelist and head of programming at Lowther Castle, and in conjunction with the Holker Estate, de Bellaigue set up the Lake District Book Festival, which from June 2026 will be held over the second weekend of June every year at Cartmel Race Course.

== Academic affiliations ==
- Summer, 2026: Visiting Fellow at All Souls College, Oxford
- 2024 - : Honorary Fellow, University of St Andrews
- Spring, 2013: Fisher Family Fellow at the Belfer Center for Science and International Affairs, Harvard University
- 2007-2008: Alistair Horne Fellow at St Antony's College, Oxford

== Bibliography ==
- In the Rose Garden of the Martyrs: A Memoir of Iran. New York: HarperCollins. ISBN 978-0066209807
- The Struggle for Iran (2007). New York: New York Review of Books. ISBN 9781590172384
- Rebel Land: Among Turkey's Forgotten People (2009). New York: The Penguin Press. ISBN 978-1594202520
- Rebel Land: Unraveling the Riddle of History in a Turkish Town (Penguin, 2010)
- Patriot of Persia: Muhammad Mossadegh and a Tragic Anglo-American Coup (2012). New York: Harper. ISBN 978-0061844706
- The Islamic Enlightenment: The Modern Struggle Between Faith and Reason, 1798 to Modern Times (2017). New York: Liveright Publishing. ISBN 9780871403735
- The Lion House: The Coming of a King (2022). New York: Farrar, Straus and Giroux. ISBN 9780374279189
  - La Casa del Leone: L'ascesa al potere di Solimano il Magnifico (Biblioteca di Ulisse, 2025)
- Flying Green: On the Frontiers of New Aviation (2023). New York: Columbia Global Reports. ISBN 978-1-7359137-8-0
- The Golden Throne: The Curse of a King (2025). London: The Bodley Head. ISBN 1-84792-742-4
