= Potatson National Park =

National park in Yunnan, China

Coordinates: 27°49′30″N 99°59′43″E

Potatso National Park 普达措国家公园
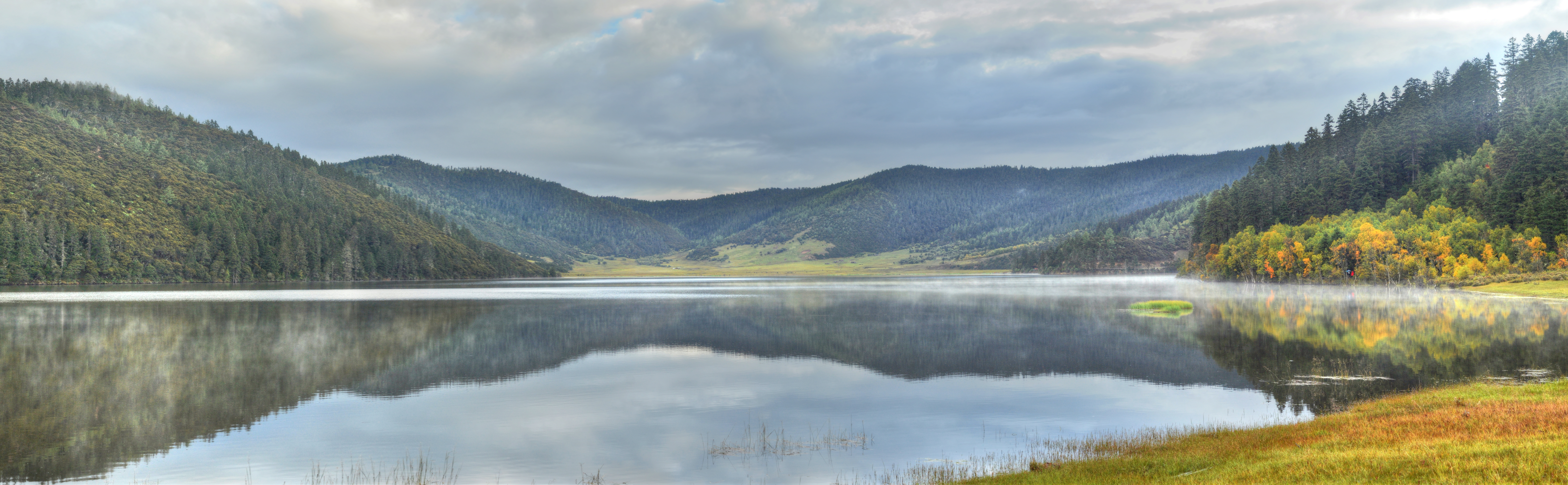
- Shudu lake

- Location within China
- Location: Yunnan
- Nearest city: Shangri-La County
- Website: pdcuo.com

Potatso National Park (普达措国家公园) is a provincially-administered natural reserve in Shangri-la, Diqing, Yunnan, China. The park covers 1,300 square kilometres (500 square miles). Despite the name, it is a national park trail site and is not part of the national park system of China.

The park was announced on June 25, 2007, and is notable as the first natural reserve park in China to meet International Union for Conservation of Nature standards. It incorporates the Bita Lake Nature Reserve and the Duhu Scenic Area in the Hongshan region. As such they are part of the Three Parallel Rivers of Yunnan Protected Areas World Heritage Site.

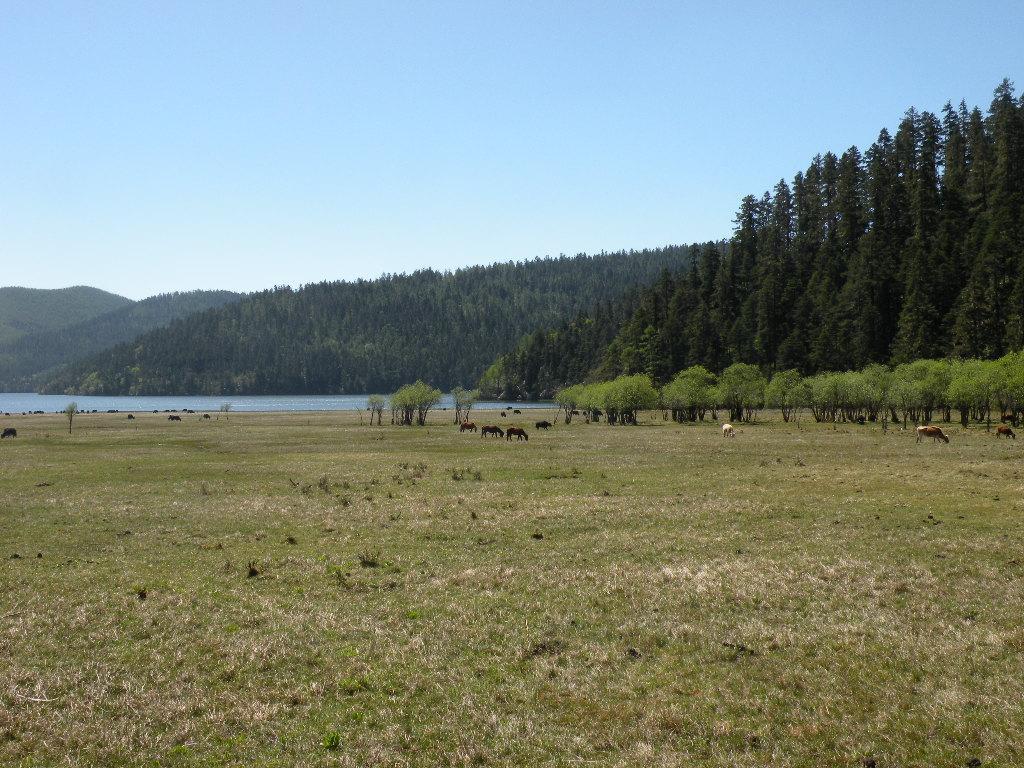
Meadow in Pudacuo

== Fauna and flora ==
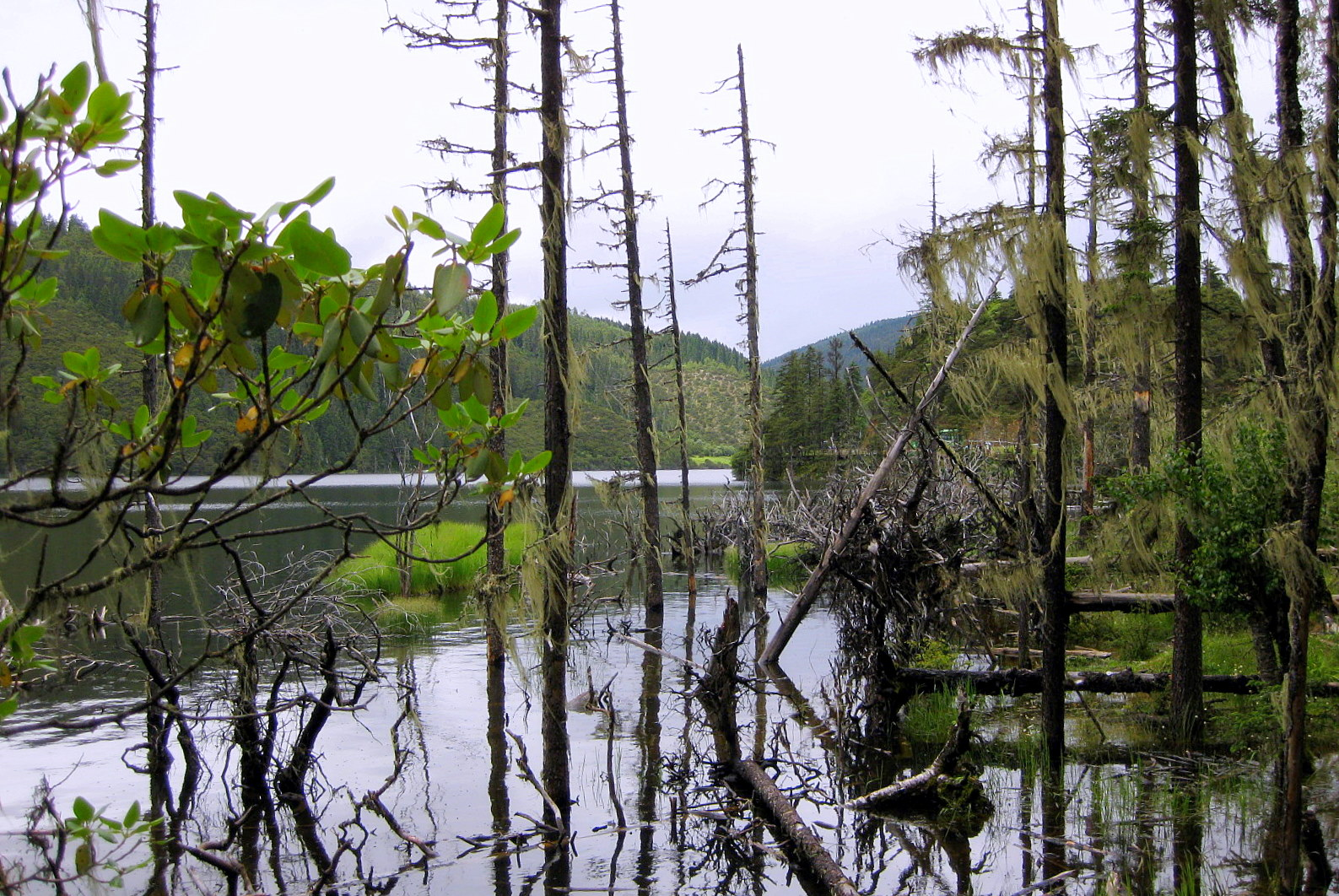
A lake in the park

The region of this park contains more than 20 percent of the country's plant species, about one-third of its mammal and bird species and almost 100 endangered species, though it comprises only 0.7 percent of China's land area. It is notably home to vulnerable Black-necked cranes, many rare and beautiful orchids, and Himalayan Yew, a coniferous tree whose extracts are a source of the anticancer drug, paclitaxel.

== Visitor information ==
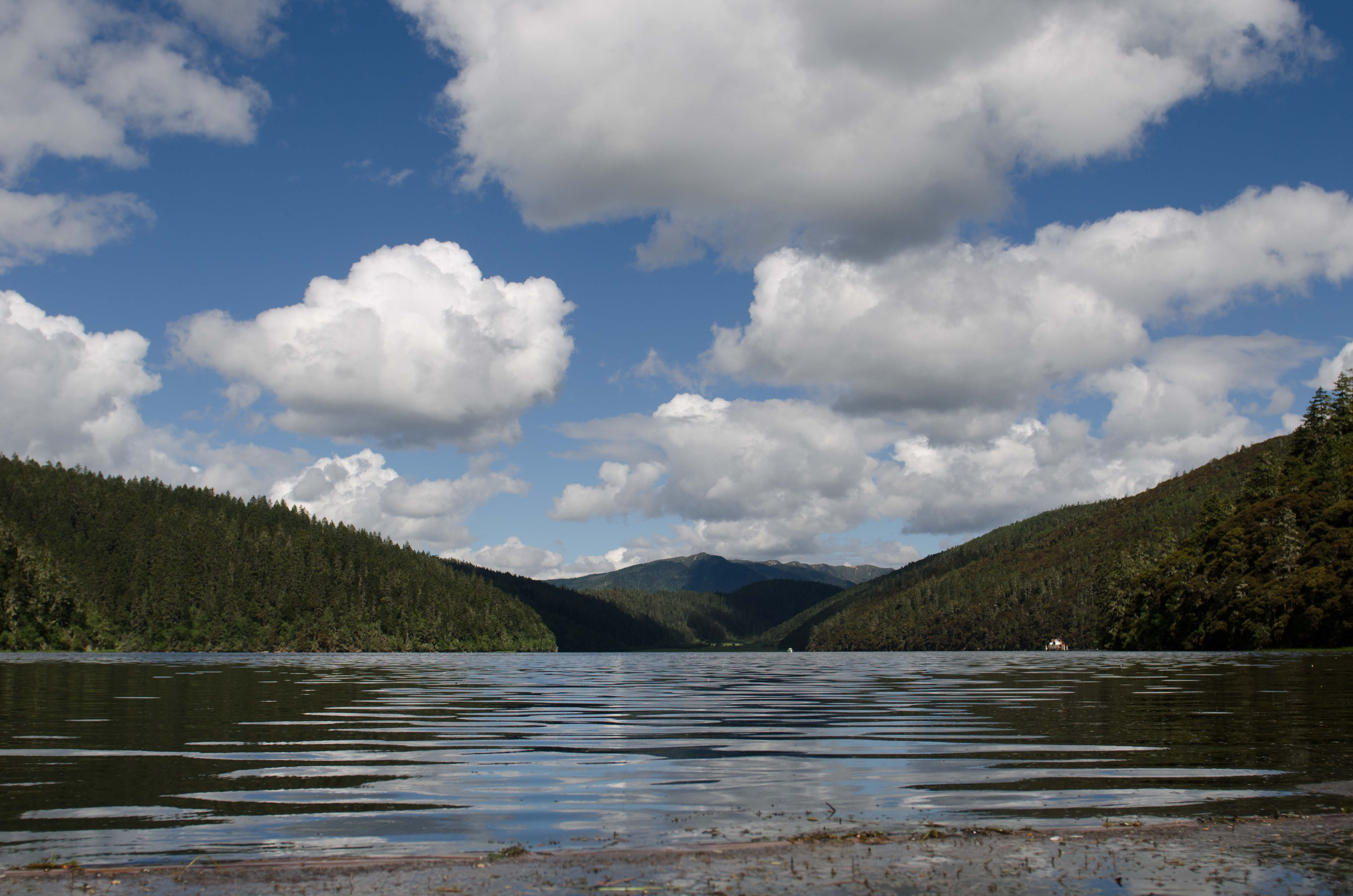
Bita Hai Lake at Potatso National Park. Photo taken from near the bus stop before starting the walk around the right side of the lake.

The park is 22 km away, about a 50-minute drive from Shangri-La City (previously called Zhongdian County). It has two lakes, a visitor center, several interesting minority villages, lush forests and pasture views. From the visitor center a park bus takes visitors to the first stop, 13 km (8 mi) away from where there are several miles of raised wooden walkways around the 120-hectare (300-acre) Shudu Lake.

The next bus destination is Bita Lake, 3,500 metres (11,482 feet) above sea level. It is surrounded by dense deciduous forests. The bus stops a few feet from a wharf from where visitors can take a boat ride around the lake and to the island in the center. Price for the boat ride is 50 Yuan. It is just over 1.6 km (1.0 mi) from where the boat disembarks to the bus pick up point. Alternatively, one may walk down the 1.9 km (1.2 mi) path from the South entrance and hike to and exit the park from the West entrance. Getting to the West entrance requires both a boat and ferry ride. The entire hike can take 4–6 hours. Riding horses are also available.

Free admission to Xiagei Village is included in the park's 190 Yuan admission fee.

== See also ==
- List of national parks of the People's Republic of China
