= Shudu Lake =

Plateau lake in Yunnan, China

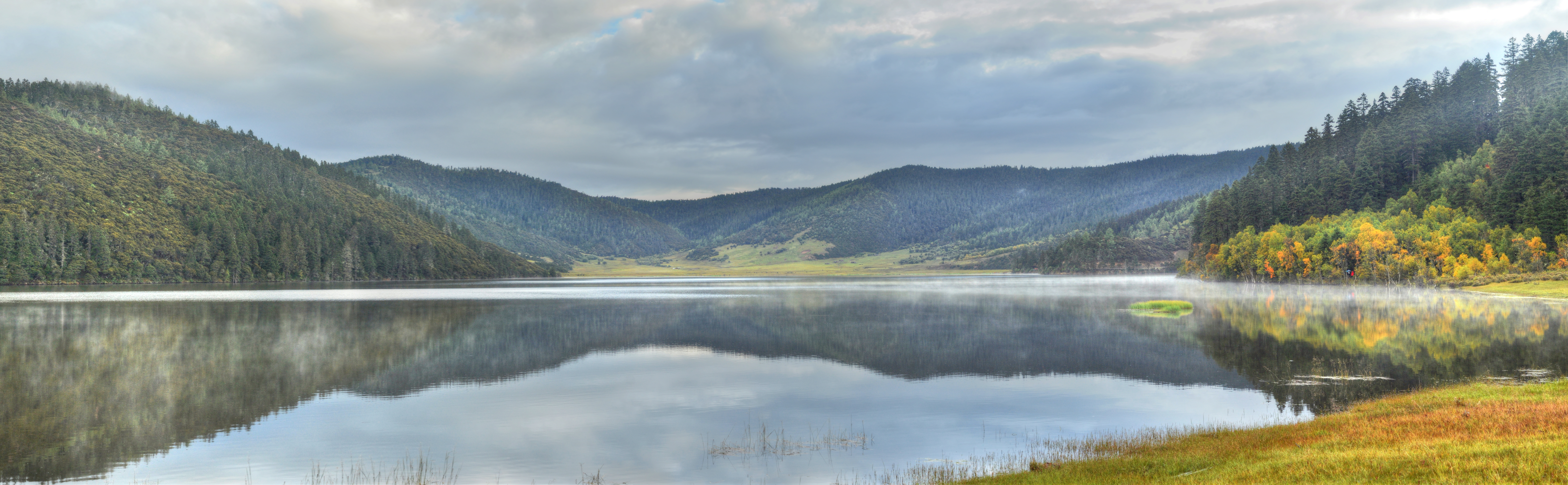

- Location within Yunnan
- Coordinates: 27°54′30″N 99°56′30″E
- Basin countries: China
- Max. length: 2.1 km (1 mi)
- Max. width: 0.9 km (1 mi)
- Surface area: 1.1 km^{2} (0 sq mi)
- Max. depth: 10 m (33 ft)
- Surface elevation: 3,705 m (12,156 ft)

Shudu Lake (Chinese: 属都海; pinyin: Shǔdū Hǎi) is a plateau lake in Shangri-La County, Yunnan Province，southwest of China. The lake is located in Pudacuo National Park and has a total area of about 1.1 square kilometers, with an elevation of 3705 m.
