= Giant Panda National Park =

National Park in China

- 大熊猫国家公园
- Location: Sichuan, Shaanxi and Gansu, China
- Area: 21,978.44 km^{2} (8,485.92 sq mi)
- Established: 12 October 2021; 4 years ago
- Governing body: Giant Panda National Park Administration
- Website: Official page

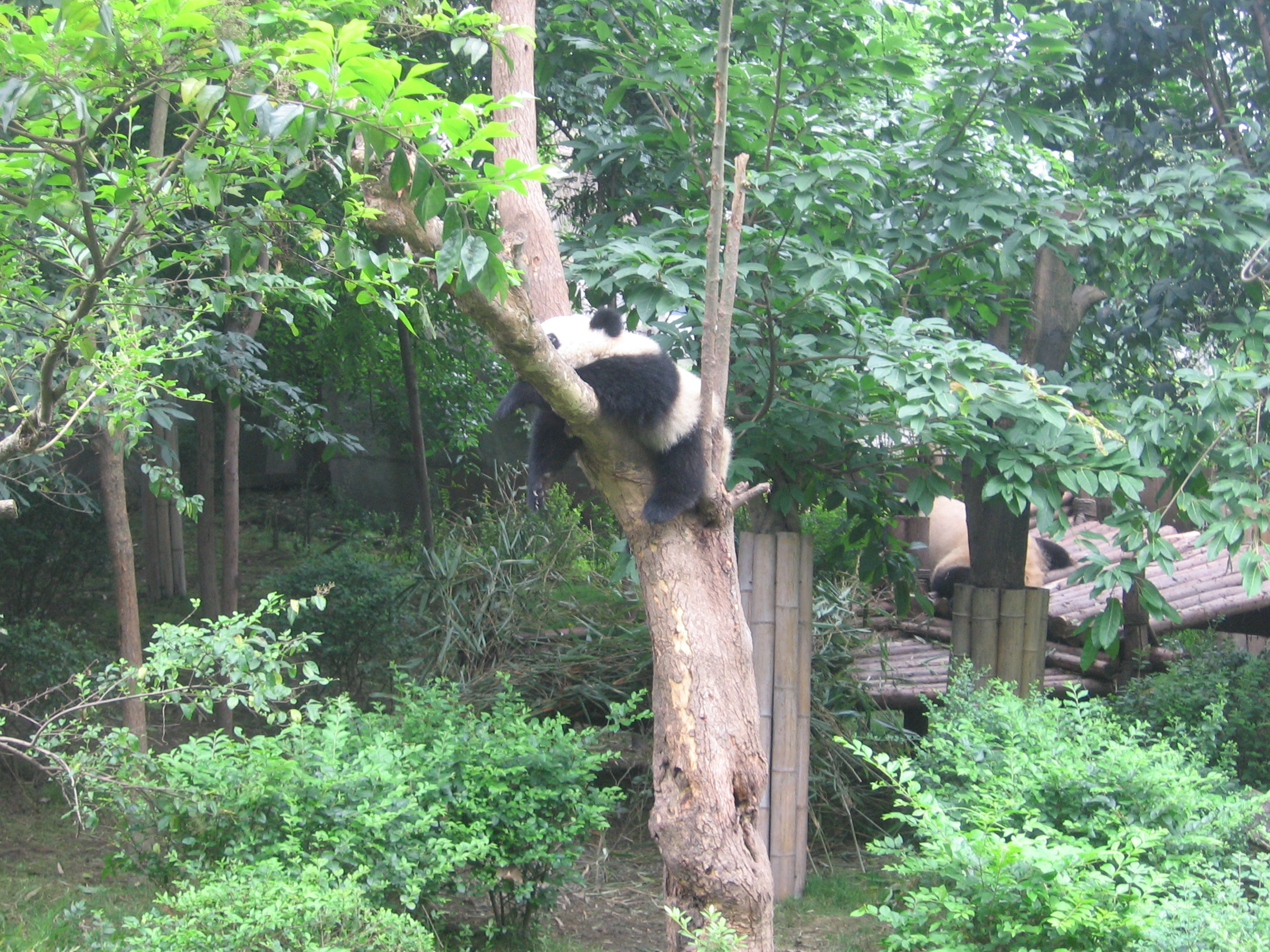
Sichuan Giant Panda Sanctuaries

Giant Panda National Park (Chinese: 大熊猫国家公园) is a national park of China. It is a large protected area within the Sichuan, Gansu, and Shaanxi provinces of China. Established in 2020, the park is made up of 67 nature reserves and is 27,134 km^{2} (10,476 sq mi) in size, making it more than three times the size of Yellowstone National Park.

The main purpose of the national park is to protect China's small giant panda population. The park's area is home to 1,864 giant pandas, which makes up 80% of the species' population in China. This amount accounts for most of the population of giant pandas worldwide. This includes the estimated 100 to 350 individuals of the Qinling panda subspecies housed in the park.

== Overview ==
China first unveiled plans for the national park in 2017. A year later in March 2018, the state-owned Bank of China pledged CN¥10 billion (US$1.1 billion) through a five-year funding package.

In the decades leading to the plans, China's giant panda habitats had been fragmented by human activity, natural disasters, and climate change. This scattered giant panda populations into roughly 30 isolated groups, located across mountain ranges in the western provinces of Sichuan, Shaanxi, and Gansu. The national park reconnects these populations by combining 67 existing natural reserves and protected areas into a single space.

The national park's main purpose is to ensure the giant panda's long-term survival by diversifying the gene pool. By reintegrating the fragmented populations, which can contain less than 10 pandas, the park reduces the possibility that the pandas inbreed or mate with individuals with similar genes. It allows pandas to cross provincial boundaries and roam more freely, so that they can choose from a greater variety of mates, thus increasing the species' genetic diversity.

It has been suggested that the fragmented nature of the park, containing many stretches of active highway, is likely to have detrimental effects on panda health. In Highway increases concentrations of toxic metals in giant panda habitat, the article states, “The concentrations of Cu, Zn, Mn, Pb, Cr, Ni, Cd, Hg, and As in soil samples collected from sites along a major highway bisecting the panda’s habitat were analyzed to investigate whether the highway was an important source of metal contamination”.
