= Mafia Mamma =

2023 film by Catherine Hardwicke

- Theatrical release poster
- Directed by: Catherine Hardwicke
- Screenplay by: Michael J. Feldman; Debbie Jhoon
- Story by: Amanda Sthers
- Produced by: Amanda Sthers; Toni Collette; Christopher Simon
- Starring: Toni Collette; Monica Bellucci; Sophia Nomvete; Eduardo Scarpetta
- Cinematography: Patrick Murguia
- Edited by: Waldemar Centeno
- Music by: Alex Heffes
- Production companies: Ingenious Media; Idea(L); Vocab Films; New Sparta Production
- Distributed by: Bleecker Street
- Release date: April 14, 2023
- Running time: 101 minutes
- Country: United States
- Languages: English; Italian
- Box office: $7 million

Mafia Mamma is a 2023 American action comedy film directed by Catherine Hardwicke, from a screenplay by Michael J. Feldman and Debbie Jhoon, and based on an original story by Amanda Sthers. It stars Toni Collette as an American woman who travels to Italy following the death of her grandfather, whom she discovers was a mafia Don. Monica Bellucci, Eduardo Scarpetta and Sophia Nomvete also star.

Filming began in Rome in May 2022. The film was released theatrically in the United States by Bleecker Street on April 14, 2023, and grossed $7 million worldwide.

== Plot ==
Kristin, a writer and sales expert for a cosmetics company, is in the throes of a midlife crisis: her only son has just left for college, she catches her husband having sex with a younger woman in their home, and her bosses at the company treat her with contempt. She receives a call from a lawyer named Bianca in Lazio, learning that her only living relative, her grandfather, has died so she must attend his funeral and be present at the reading of his will.

Kristin's friend Jenny convinces her that attending the funeral will give her a chance to start over. Upon landing in Rome, Kristin runs into a local, Lorenzo, and his aunt Esmeralda. She is attracted to him, so gives him her number before being picked up by Bianca's associates, Dante and Aldo. The funeral proceeds smoothly until armed men ambush them, and the coffin is destroyed by bullets. Aldo and Dante, following Bianca's instructions, get Kristin to safety.

At the reading, Bianca reveals that she is actually the consigliere of the Balbano family, a powerful branch of the Sicilian Mafia. Kristin learns that her grandfather was the head of the family, and that despite disapproving of his son having a child with an American woman, he wishes to honor tradition and have Kristin succeed him. A hysterical Kristin demands to leave, but Bianca calms her, and persuades her to take on the role.

Kristin's first act as boss is to meet with Don Carlo, head of the rival Romano family, and settle a dispute between the two gangs over the murders of both her grandfather and the previous Romano don. Carlo seduces Kristin, luring her into his hotel room, where he slips a dose of poison into her limoncello. As Kristin prefers the glass with less liquor, she switches them, so Don Carlo poisons himself. The Romanos promote Carlo's cousin, "Mammone", to succeed him.

Fabrizio, Kristin's caporegime, disagrees with her plans to diversify the Balbano family's criminal operations by setting up "legal" businesses that include reopening her grandfather's winery. Lorenzo and Kristin grow closer, but the relationship is frustrated by an inability for either of them to commit to each other.

A hitman sent by Don Mammone interrupts Kristin in the middle of a Zoom conference with her bosses. She manages to stab him to death with her heel, only to for them to fire her.

A despondent Kristin goes to Lorenzo's house, and they sleep together. The next day, she meets with Don Mammone, who agrees to forswear any further acts of vengeance and restore the peace between their families. Kristin finally accepts her situation and begins to take a more active involvement in the family, while also spending more time with Lorenzo. Their relationship is tested when her husband suddenly turns up, broke and seeking her help. Kristin refuses to do so, sending him away. She also lies to her son about Lorenzo, claiming he is only a friend, and causing him to question whether she truly loves him.

Kristin arranges a meeting with the Romanos to announce she is retiring from the Mafia, giving her role as boss to Bianca. Don Mammone is enraged, and an armed standoff ensues before police officers led by Lorenzo and Esmeralda (who are secretly undercover detectives) raid the meeting place and take everyone into custody.

Kristin hires Jenny to represent her in court, and because many of the locals have benefitted from her family's largess, they testify in her favor. Cleared of all charges, she meets with Lorenzo, who introduces himself as Rudy. Kristin forgives him for deceiving her but decides to devote herself entirely to the family.

Bianca is seemingly murdered, and Kristin finds both her husband and her son held at gunpoint by Fabrizio, who is a traitor in league with the Romanos. He is about to murder Kristin when Bianca catches him off guard, and Kristin drops him to his death inside a grape crusher. She sends his finger as a warning to Don Mammone.

Sometime later, Kristin's son is about to return home. As he departs, he sees his mother formally receiving guests in her capacity as head of the Balbano family.

== Cast ==
- Toni Collette as Kristin
- Monica Bellucci as Bianca
- Sophia Nomvete as Jenny
- Eduardo Scarpetta as Fabrizio
- Alfonso Perugini as Dante
- Francesco Mastroianni as Aldo
- Giulio Corso as Rudy a.k.a. "Lorenzo"
- Dora Romano as Maria a.k.a. "Aunt Esmeralda"
- Giuseppe Zeno as Carlo Romano
- Vincenzo Pirrotta as "Mammone" Romano
- Tommy Rodger as Domenick
- Alessandro Cremona as Bruno
- Alessandro Bressanello as Don Giuseppe Balbano
- Tim Daish as Paul

== Production ==
Mafia Mamma was reported to be in pre-production in October 2021, with Catherine Hardwicke on board as director. Michael J. Feldman and Debbie Jhoon wrote the screenplay, based on an original story by Amanda Sthers. Toni Collette, Monica Bellucci, and Rob Huebel were cast in leading roles but ultimately Huebel did not appear in the film.

Principal photography took place in May 2022 on location in Rome, Italy.

== Release ==
Mafia Mamma was released theatrically in the United States on April 14, 2023, by Bleecker Street. The film was released digitally on May 2, 2023, and on DVD and Blu-ray on June 6.

== Reception ==
=== Box office ===
Mafia Mamma grossed $3.5 million in the United States and Canada, and $3.5 million in other territories, for a worldwide total of $7 million.

Released alongside Renfield, The Pope's Exorcist, Suzume, and Sweetwater, the film made $866,940 in its first day and went to debut on $2 million from 2,002 theatres, finishing eighth at the box office.

=== Critical response ===
On the review aggregator website Rotten Tomatoes, 21% of 108 critics' reviews are positive, with an average rating of 4.2/10. The website's consensus reads: "Riddled with stereotypes, fatally unfunny, and a total tonal mishmash, Mafia Mamma is a criminal waste of Toni Collette." Metacritic, which uses a weighted average, assigned the film a score of 42 out of 100, based on 23 critics, indicating "mixed or average" reviews. Audiences polled by Cinemascore gave the film an average grade of "B" on an A+ to F scale, while those polled at PostTrak gave it a 64% positive score, with 44% saying they would definitely recommend it.

Jude Dry writing for IndieWire gave the film a B− grade. She thought the plot "leaves much to be desired" and felt Bellucci's Italian character was underdeveloped. She ended her review with: Though it's all satisfyingly silly, Mafia Mamma never quite find its tone. Hardwicke doesn't seem to know if she's doing Quentin Tarantino or Mel Brooks, and the two styles are so far apart that splitting the difference lands the movie out at sea". Deadline Hollywood's Pete Hammond wrote, "In its own way, veteran director Catherine Hardwicke has turned all this into a more mainstream feminist comedy, a vehicle for Collette, who lifts it up a few notches and makes it all passable and likable enough for its 100-minute running time".

Frank Scheck of The Hollywood Reporter criticized the writing of Collette's character, saying "Mafia Mamma squanders her considerable talents", but praised Bellucci's character. He ended his review with "If you want to see a truly witty comedy dealing with similar themes, stick with rewatching Jonathan Demme's terrific 1988 film Married to the Mob". Peter Debruge of Variety called the film "a fun fish-out-of-water farce with Godfather DNA and a clever female-empowerment kick, Mafia Mamma makes inspired use of Collette, who’s never better than when playing women we oughtn't to have underestimated".
