= Tushar Tyagi =

Indian film director (born 1989)

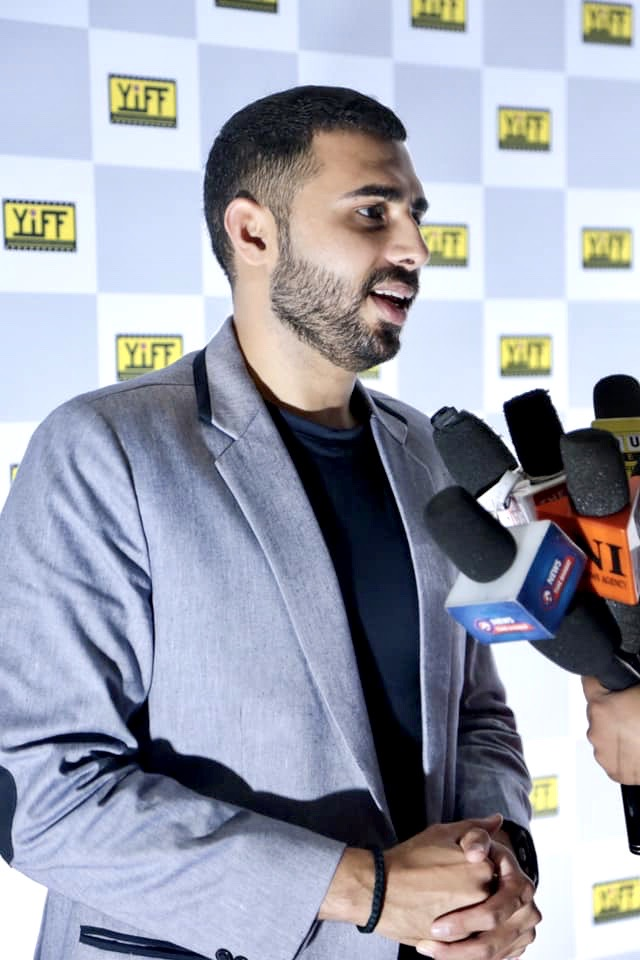
- Tushar Tyagi at Yellostone International Film Festival
- Born: 27 December 1989 (age 35); Moradabad, Uttar Pradesh, India
- Occupation(s): Film director, producer, writer and actor
- Website: www.tushartyagi.net

Tushar Tyagi born on 27 December 1989 (Meerut, Uttar Pradesh, India), is an Indian film Director.

== Early life ==
Tyagi completed his schooling in Meerut, India and graduated with a degree in Computer Engineering from College of Engineering Roorkee. He later obtained a diploma in Mass communication & Radio Management program from Salam n Namaste Radio, IMS Noida India. He also pursued courses in filmmaking from the New York Film Academy and AAFT, Noida India.

== Notable works ==
- Lying is done with words, and also with silence (June, 2013)
  - This film shows how a man, who is unknown starts convincing a woman to get intimate, causes relationship with her sister to ruin.
- Inception of a lost Art (Aug, 2013)
  - This 147-minute film presents a mysterious man, who challenges a woman for his art. It is a story of unseen world, which can only be answered by initiating like-minded thoughts.
- Behind a Woman's Eyes (September, 2013)
  - A journey of a woman to find the true meaning of love, whose relationship is dying, has been presented in this film. But, sometimes, we have to lose something in order to appreciate it in the later years.
- Gulabee (November, 2013)
  - Tushar Tyagi directed the movie Gulabee with the collaboration of Audacity Innovative, a motion picture company based in America. For the film Gulabee, Gujarat-based actress Avani Modi, who worked as a sex worker, created headlines for her powerful acting. She coped with unprecedented circumstances of life as a prostitute and showed courage to fight with the challenges of her past. The film was rewarded with a Royal Reel award at Canada International Film Festival, Vancouver, British Columbia, Canada.

== Films as a director and writer ==
| Year | Film name | Language | Star cast |
|---|---|---|---|
| January 2013 | Didn't Learn a Lesson | English | Leah Coles, Alfonso Perugini |
| April 2013 | The Betrayal | English | Reina Marie Cibella, Veronica Nolte, Alfonso Perugini, Tushar Tyagi |
| May 2013 | An Absent Dream | English | Charlie Cakes, Al Danuzio, Alexia Jordan, Giuseppe Santochirico, Anna Tomasino |
| June 2013 | Lying is done with words also with silence | English | Reina Marie Cibella, Veronica Nolte, Alfonso Perugini, Tushar Tyagi |
| August 2013 | Inception of a lost art | English | Alexia Jordan, Philip Lombardo |
| September 2013 | Behind the woman’s eye | English | Philip Lombardo, Jessica Madelaine, Eric Paterniani, Alfonso Perugini, Teddy Wang |
| November 2013 | Gulabee | English | Priyanka Charan, Avani Modi, Sanjay Roy, Nishi Singh, Priyank Tatariya |

== Films as an actor ==
| Year | Film name | Language | Star cast |
|---|---|---|---|
| January 2013 | Enjoying at NYFA | English | Leah Coles, Paul Leques, Frank Rivera, Tushar Tyagi |
| January 2013 | Looking for Something | English | Michael Boyle, Leah Coles, Tushar Tyagi |
| March 2013 | Loyalty | Chinese, English | Owen Hu, Alfonso Perugini, Kexu Song, Tushar Tyagi |
| April 2013 | The Betrayal | English | Reina Marie Cibella, Veronica Nolte, Alfonso Perugini, Tushar Tyagi |

== Film as an assistant director ==
| Year | Film name | Language | Star cast |
|---|---|---|---|
| August 2013 | Blind Date | English | Kelsey Deanne, Pamela Ehn Stewart, Adam Kaster, Reggie Lochard, Hannibal Miles, Samat Turgunbaev |
| March 2014 | The Best Photograph | Chinese, English | Meredith Antoian, Cobus Cooper Gomes |
| July 2014 | On Golden years | English | Ranjit Chowdhry, Jyoti Singh, Reeves Lehmann, Shetal Shah, etc. |
| April 2015 | Mr. X | Hindi | Emraan Hashmi, Amyra Dastur, etc. |
| July 2016 | Dishoom | Hindi | John Abraham, Varun Dhawan, Jacqueline Fernandez, Akshaye Khanna, etc. |

== Awards and recognition ==
=== Awards ===
- Indian Cine Film Festival 2014 – Best Screen Play award -
- Canada International Film Festival, Royal Reel Award in 2014 (Foreign Film Competition)
- Universal Film festival – Best Cinematography i a Film 2014

=== Recognitions ===
- Louisville's International Festival of Films in Louisville (2014)
- New York Indian Film Festival, 2014
- Richmond International Film Festival in 2015
- GNARL Fest of the United Kingdom 2014
- On The Judges’ Panel for 48 Film Project Beverly Hills, La based Film Festival
