= List of national parks of China =

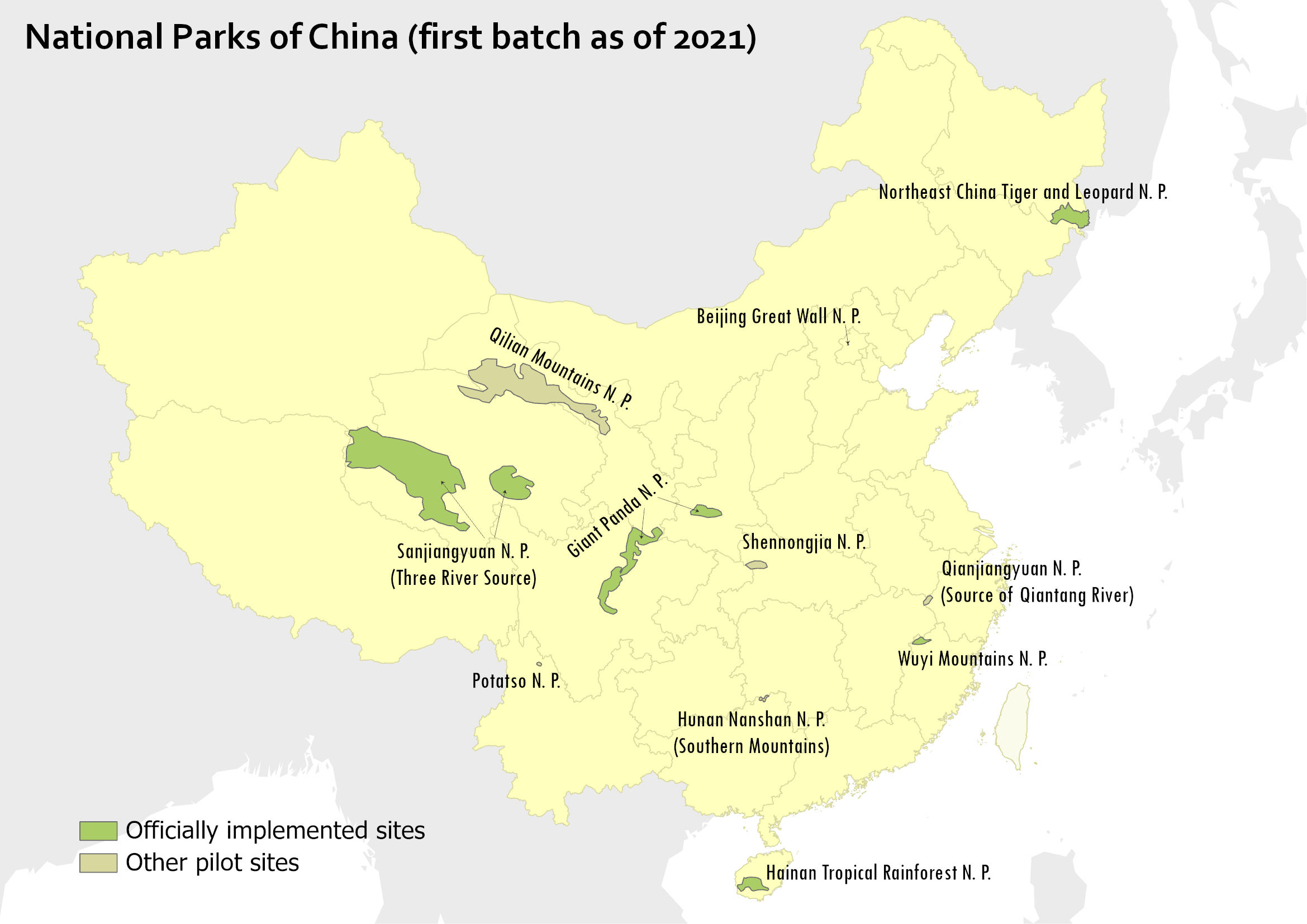
China's National Parks

The People's Republic of China has 5 national parks, which are announced by the President of China and administered by the National Forestry and Grassland Administration. The first designation list of national parks was released on October 12, 2021.

== List of National Parks ==
The list is arranged in the order of official documents of the National Forestry and Grassland Administration.

Name	Image	Location	Official designation	Area (km^{2})	Description
Sanjiangyuan National Park (三江源国家公园)		Qinghai	October 12, 2021	190,100	To protect source waters of three great rivers: Yangtze River, Lancang River and Yellow River.
Giant Panda National Park (大熊猫国家公园)		Sichuan, Shaanxi, and Gansu	October 12, 2021	22,000	To protect natural environmental corridors connecting different habitats of pandas.
Northeast China Tiger and Leopard National Park (东北虎豹国家公园)		Jilin and Heilongjiang	October 12, 2021	14,000	To recover communities and populations of wild tigers and leopards in northeastern China.
Hainan Tropical Rainforest National Park (海南热带雨林国家公园)		Hainan	October 12, 2021	4,260	To protect the tropical rainforest in Hainan.
Wuyi Mountains National Park (武夷山国家公园)		Fujian	October 12, 2021	1,280.59	To protect the biodiversity of the Wuyi Mountains.

== List of pilot sites ==
The pilot sites are administered by the provincial governments with the approval of the central government. The pilot sites are not part of the national park system of China, nor operated by the National Forestry and Grassland Administration.

Name	Image	Location	pilot date	Area (km^{2})	Description
Hubei Shennongjia National Park (湖北神农架国家公园)		Hubei	May 14, 2016	1,170	To protect local ecological systems of sub-tropical forests and sphagnum palustre swamplands.
Zhejiang Qianjiangyuan National Park (浙江钱江源国家公园)		Zhejiang	July 15, 2016	252	To protect endangered species near the source of Qiantang River.
Hunan Nanshan National Park (湖南南山国家公园)		Hunan	August 8, 2016	635.94	To protect birds and other ecological landscapes.
Yunnan Potatson National Park (普达措国家公园)		Yunnan	October 26, 2016	602.1	To protect local wetlands and grasslands.
Beijing Great Wall National Park (北京长城国家公园)		Beijing	January 14, 2017	59.91	To protect historical sites at Badaling Great Wall and Ming Tombs.
Qilian Mountains National Park (祁连山国家公园)		Gansu and Qinghai	June 26, 2017	50,000	To protect endangered species in the Qilian Mountains.

== See also ==
- List of national parks
- List of protected areas of China
