= Bita Ghezelayagh =

Italian-born artist (born 1966)

Bita Ghezelayagh (born 1966, Florence, Italy) is an Iranian contemporary artist who lives and works in Tehran and London. She holds an MA in architecture from the École nationale supérieure d'architecture de Paris-La Villette and a degree in printmaking from Chelsea College of Arts. Best known for her sculptural, textile-based and felting works that reclaim traditional Iranian crafting techniques, reinterpreting and transforming them into modern art. Her work has been exhibited internationally and is held in the permanent collection of the British Museum, the Victoria and Albert Museum, the National Museum of Scotland and the Royal Ontario Museum in Canada.

She was shortlisted for the Jameel Prize in 2011.

== Biography ==
Bita Ghezelayagh was born in Florence, Italy, in 1966. Her family returned to Iran in 1968, and she grew up in Tehran. She left Iran in the mid-1980s, during the Iran-Iraq War to study architecture in France, where she obtained an MA in architecture from the École nationale supérieure d'architecture de Paris-La Villette.

Ghezelayagh returned to Iran in 1994 and worked as an architect on several projects, including the restoration of the Iranian Calligraphers Association Building. During this period, she took part in two exhibitions of paintings by Iranian female artists at the Niavaran Cultural Centre in Tehran, in 1995 and 1996. She subsequently worked as an art director on three Iranian films, including The Pear Tree, for which she received an art direction prize at the Fajr International Film Festival in 1998.[7][8]

In 2003, Ghezelayagh began studying the traditional craft of felt-making. Her first solo exhibition was held in Tehran in 2008, followed by further solo exhibitions, including a touring exhibition in the United Kingdom.[9]

Ghezelayagh has participated in group exhibitions at institutions including the Sharjah Art Museum, the Victoria and Albert Museum, Casa Árabe in Madrid, the Iris & B. Gerald Cantor Center for Visual Arts, and the San Antonio Museum of Art.[10]

Her work is held in a number of public and private collections, including the British Museum, the Victoria and Albert Museum, the National Museum of Scotland, the Royal Ontario Museum, the Farjam Foundation in Dubai, the Jameel Foundation in Saudi Arabia , the Lajevardi Foundation, Iran and the Devi Art Foundation in New Delhi. [4][5][10]

Ghezelayagh is married to British author and journalist Christopher de Bellaigue.[11]

== Artistic Practice ==
Ghezelayagh's practice focuses on textile-based media, including felt, Persian carpets, handmade silk velvet and tapestries, drawing on traditional Iranian techniques. Her Felt Memories series (2008-2009) reinterpreted the tradition of wearing talismans for protection. The series marked the first international solo exhibition of her work held at the Rose Issa Projects. According to the British Museum, he works replace the luxurious materials of historical talismans often inscribed with prayers – with felt, incorporating modern symbols and texts. Reviewing her 2018 at the Leighton House Museum, Prospect noted that her work draws on Iran's textile traditions. Her use of reclaiming fragments of Persian carpets and traditional rural garments, such as felted shepherds' coats, places her art within a wider movement to preserve and reinterpret Iran's material culture. Her latest show, called 'Everything Flows', held at Exeter College, Oxford, was featured in Hali Magazine.

=== Selected Solo Exhibitions ===
2026: Everything Flows, Exeter College, Oxford

2020: Rethreading & Retracing: Textiles and Techniques by Bita Ghezelayagh, The Aga Khan Foundation, London

2018: Leighton House Museum, London

2017: Asia House, London

2013: The Letter that Never Arrived, Rose Issa Projects, London

2011: Albareh Gallery, Bahrain

2009-10: Namad: A Persian Journey in Felt, touring show: Collins Gallery, University of Strathclyde, Glasgow, Quilters' Guild Collection, York, and Hawick Museum

2009: Felt Memories, Rose Issa Projects, London

2009: Silk and Felt, Golestan Gallery, Tehran

2007: Namad, Artists’ House (Khaneh Honarmandan), Tehran

=== Selected Group Exhibitions ===
2023: The Resistance of Pen and Paper, Richard Saltoun Gallery, London

2023; The Future of Tradition, Brunei Gallery, SOAS, London

2021: Epic Iran, Victoria and Albert Museum, London

2020: Zuleika Gallery, London

2017: Lajevardi Foundation, Tehran

2016: Shirin Gallery, Tehran

2014: Islamic Festival, Sharjah Museum of Contemporary Art (Sharjeh Art Museum), UAE

2014: Rose Issa Projects, London

2013: Caught in the Crossfire, Herbert Art Gallery and Museum, Coventry

2011-13: Jameel Prize travelling exhibition of shortlisted artists -- Victoria & Albert Museum, London; Institut du Monde Arabe, Paris; Casa Arabe, Madrid; Cantor Arts Center at Stanford University; San Antonio Museum of Art

2011: Zendegi: Twelve Contemporary Iranian Artists, Beirut Exhibition Centre

2010-11: Miragens, Centro Cultural Banco do Brasil, Rio de Janeiro, Sao Paulo and Brasilia

2010: Four Contemporary Iranian Artists, Art Dubai, Al Bastskiya Dubai

1996: Exhibition of Painting by Iranian Female Artists, Niavaran Cultural Centre, Tehran

1995: Exhibition of Painting by Iranian Female Artists, Niavaran Cultural Centre, Tehran
