= Hali Magazine =

Quarterly encyclopedic magazine

Hali Magazine is an encyclopedic fully illustrated special-interest quarterly publication focusing on antique and modern textile art of the world, especially Oriental rugs and Carpets, and collateral areas of Islamic, Asian, African, and tribal art. The magazine is written by and for professionals and amateurs in the field. The name Hali is derived from the ancient and modern Turkish word for carpet. It was established in London in 1978.
