= Lili Bita =

Greek-American writer

Lili Bita, or Lili Bita Zaller, was a Greek-American author, poet, translator, artist and drama teacher.

== Biography ==
Lili Bita was born on the island of Zante (Zakynthos). She graduated from the Greek Conservatory of Athens and the Athens School of Drama, and performed on the Athens stage and with leading Greek repertory companies. In 1957 she emigrated to the Federal Republic of West Germany, and in 1959 to the United States, becoming a naturalized citizen in 1969. She earned an M.A in drama from the University of Miami in 1978.

Bita pursued a dual career in the United States as actress and author, notably with her one-woman shows "The Greek Woman Through the Ages" and "Freedom or Death". She taught at numerous American universities, most recently at Villanova University (1989–91). In 1987-88 she was Artist in Residence at Drexel University. In 1995 she toured India, as a member of the International Foundation “European Art Center-EUARCE”, under the auspices of the Greek government, and returned there as part of the World Shakespeare Conference in 2002.

She offered master classes on the art of drama in more than fifty American universities. Her verse has been translated into English, French, German, Spanish, and Bengali. In 2014, she was elected to the Hellenic Authors Society, the oldest and most prestigious literary society in Greece.

Bita died on February 12, 2018, in Philadelphia, Pennsylvania.

Early in her career, Anaïs Nin wrote of her: "Lili Bita fulfills her promise. . . . Her words are strong, body and soul in balance. Her vision is direct, unifying and complete."

== Works ==
Prose fiction:

- Steps on the Earth (1955)
- Zero Hour (1971)
- The Scorpion and Other Stories (1998)

Poetry:

- Lightning in the Flesh (1968)
- Furies (1969; preface by Anaïs Nin)
- Blood Sketches (1973)
- Sacrifice, Exile, Night (1976)
- Fleshfire (1980; second edition, expanded, 1984; third edition, expanded, 2016)
- Firewalkers (1985)
- Bacchic Odes (1986)
- Excavations (1993)
- Striking the Sky (Ed. European Art Center (EUARCE) of Greece 1997)
- Lethe (2001)
- Lightning in the Flesh: New and Selected Poems, Athens Printing (January 1, 1999), (2003; Greek only)
- Women of Fire and Blood (2007)
- The Thrust of the Blade (2011)

Autobiographical:

- Sister of Darkness (Somerset Hall Press, 2005). ISBN 0-9724661-8-5
- The Storm Rider (2012). ISBN 978-1-935244-10-3 (With Robert Zaller)

Translations:

- Anaïs Nin, A Spy in the House of Love (1974; second edition, 1983)
- Joy Stocke, The Cave of the Bear (1999)
- Thirty Years in the Rain: The Selected Poetry of Nikiforos Vrettakos (2005). (With Robert Zaller)
- The Scorpion and Other Stories (Pella, 1998). ISBN 9780918618696, Translator Robert Zaller

Plays:

- Hyena, Bars
- Sundays in the Cemetery
- The Judge
- The First Lady of Adrian

Anthology

- Pomegranate Seeds: An Anthology of Greek-American Poetry, (ed. Dean Kostos; Somerset Hall Press, 2008)
- Contemporary Greek women poets. Translated by Eleni Fourtouni. Thelphini Press. 1978. ISBN 978-0-915017-00-3.
