= Arthur Si-Bita =

Cameroonian film director (1948–2016)

- Born: 1948
- Citizenship: Cameroon
- Occupation: Film director

Arthur Si-Bita (1948–2016) was a Cameroonian film director.

== Filmography ==
- Cultural Week of May 20, 1978 (1978)
- La Voice of the Poet at Mount Cameroon (1978)
- Masters and Disciples (1978)
- The Broken Guitar (1979)
- No Time to Say Goodbye (1981)
- The Cooperants (1983)
- The Lions Saga (1990)
- The Professional Voyeurs (2004)
