= Bita Moghaddam =

Iranian-American neuroscientist

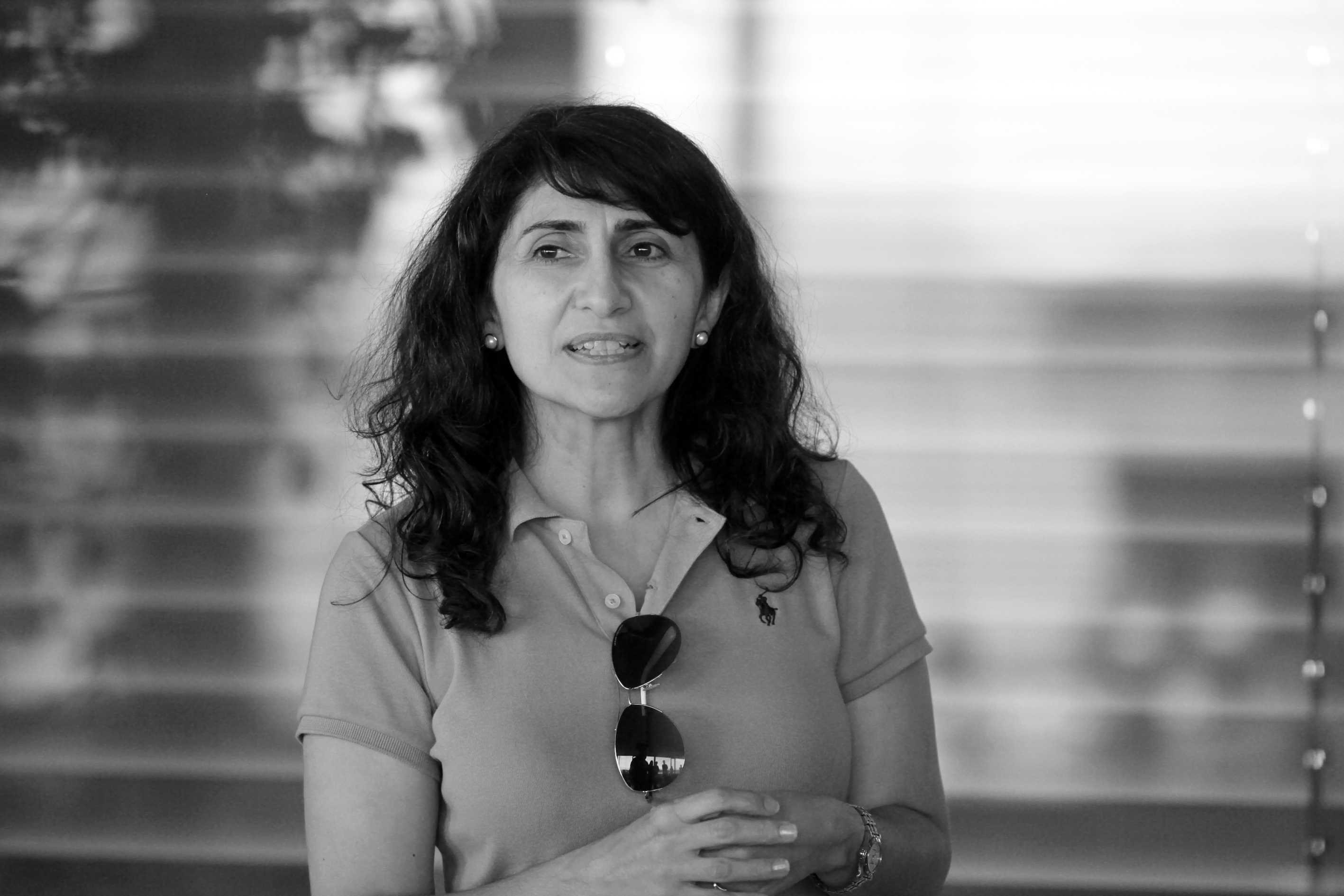
- Born: Iran
- Education: PhD at University of Kansas, Postdoctoral work at Yale University
- Known for: Glutamate hyperactivity and disinhibition hypothesis of schizophrenia, original identification of the prefrontal cortex dopamine-glutamate circuitry as the site of action of ketamine and implicating this circuitry in stress and anxiety Author of KETAMINE MIT Press/Penguin Random House
- Awards: Dolores Shockley Award, Paul Jansen Award for Excellence in Schizophrenia Research, Efron Award for Excellence in Research Related to Neuropsychopharmacology, 2014 CINP Neuroscience Basic Research Award, MERIT Award from the National Institute of Mental Health
- Scientific career
- Fields: Neuroscience
- Workplaces: Yale, University of Pittsburgh, Oregon Health & Science University

Bita Moghaddam is an Iranian-American neuroscientist and author. She is currently the professor of behavioral neuroscience and psychiatry at Oregon Health & Science University. Moghaddam investigates the neuronal processes underlying emotion and cognition as a first step to designing strategies to treat and prevent brain illnesses.

== Early life and education ==
Moghaddam (born 1962) grew up in Iran with her mother, father, and sister. She was raised in an environment where her parents emphasized the importance of education.

In the late 1970s, Moghaddam moved to the United States to pursue her education. She graduated summa cum lade from Avila University in 1982 with a major in chemistry and minor in mathematics. She moved on to the University of Kansas to work on her PhD. When Moghaddam started her graduate education, she had intentions to pursue her dissertation work in chemistry, but was inspired by one of her professors, Dr. Ralph Adams, and his innovative applications of analytical chemistry to understand brain chemistry. After becoming fascinated by the neural processes underlying schizophrenia, Moghaddam decided to pursue a PhD, and a career, in neuroscience. Under the mentorship of Dr. Ralph Adams, Moghaddam could learn from a pioneer in the field, how to build and apply electroanalytical tools to study dopamine.

During her PhD, Moghaddam worked on improving graphite electrodes for in vivo electrochemical experiments studying cationic primary neurotransmitters. In 1986, Moghaddam published a first author paper in the Annals of the New York Academy of Sciences describing her improvements of the in vivo voltammetry method for applications in neuroscience. Moghaddam then published another first author paper highlighting her findings, using potassium-selective microelectrodes, that extracellular potassium concentrations vary across brain regions. In 1987, Moghaddam completed her dissertation in which she simultaneously recorded the extracellular levels of both ions and neurotransmitters in the mammalian brain. After her PhD, Moghaddam pursued her postdoctoral training at Yale University in New Haven, Connecticut. At Yale, Moghaddam worked under the mentorship of Dr. Benjamin Bunney in the Department of Psychiatry exploring the modulatory effects of dopaminergic signalling in the striatum. Moghaddam published 6 first author papers during her three-year postdoctoral studies. Moghaddam used the technique of in vivo microdialysis to look at the composition of extracellular dopamine in the rodent brain in various experimental preparations. She first discovered that the cocaine administration in rodents induced a higher magnitude increase in extracellular dopamine in the Nucleus Accumbens compared to the Medial Prefrontal Cortex. In the Journal of Neurochemistry, she then reported the effects of perfusing solution on extracellular dopamine levels and the downstream effects this has on dopaminergic brain systems. Just before she began her faculty position at Yale, Moghaddam published another first author paper in the Journal of Neurochemistry reporting that administration of different antipsychotic drugs to rats has distinct effects on the release of dopamine in the Prefrontal Cortex, Nucleus Accumbens and the Striatum.

== Career and research ==
In 1990, Moghaddam started her first faculty position at Yale University in the Department of Psychiatry. She set up her lab to explore the neurobiology of midbrain dopamine neurons and prefrontal cortical subregions, key brain systems implicated in schizophrenia. In a study published in Biological Psychiatry in 1991, the Moghaddam lab reported that Ventral Tegmental Area dopamine neurons are activated both before stimulus onset, signifying an internal state of anticipation, in addition to firing in response to rewarding post-stimulus outcomes. Moghaddam continued to collaborate with her postdoctoral mentor and others at Yale to explore the effects of typical schizophrenia medications on brain chemistry in vivo.

As a young professor at Yale, Moghaddam started to focus on the potential that aberrant glutamate signaling might be a large contributing factor to the pathology of schizophrenia, so she began to explore glutamate regulation and modulatory effects of glutamate in the brain regions associated with schizophrenia. She discovered that stress increases glutamate release in prefrontal cortex and hippocampus, and that stress-induced cortical dopamine release is controlled by local activation of ionotropic glutamate receptors (AMPA receptors and kainate receptors). A few years later, she found that metabotropic glutamate receptors regulate dopamine release in the striatum, adding to the understanding of the diverse interactions between glutamate and dopaminergic system in the brain. She also made a novel finding regarding the regulation of glutamate release during times of stress, such that glucocorticoids, released as a result of HPA axis activation, inhibit the stress-induced output of glutamate in the prefrontal cortex. In 1998, Moghaddam's lab reported that the compound LY354740, a metabotropic glutamate receptor agonist, suppresses aberrant glutamate release and reduces behavioral disruptions in animals given PCP or ketamine. These findings suggested that LY354740 could potentially be used to treat schizophrenia and other psychiatric disorders characterized by aberrant glutamate transmission.

In 2003, Moghaddam was recruited to the University of Pittsburgh. At Pitt, Moghaddam took on more teaching roles than she had previously at Yale, and she became a critical mentor to many young undergraduate students hoping to pursue opportunities in neuroscience. At Pitt, Moghaddam made many contributions to the field of neuroscience by continuing to probe how modulation of glutamate signalling affects behavior and neural circuit function in models for anxiety and schizophrenia. She then expanded her laboratory focus to understanding glutamatergic interactions and dopaminergic systems in adolescence since many of the symptoms of psychiatric conditions emerge during adolescence and targeting aberrant functions during this developmental period will be essential to preventing onset of disease in adulthood.

In 2017, Moghaddam joined the faculty at the Oregon Health Sciences University (OHSU) as the Chair of the Department of Behavioral Neuroscience. Moghaddam continues to probe the brain mechanisms involved in cognition and emotion in brain areas implicated in schizophrenia, anxiety, attention deficit hyperactivity disorder (ADHD), and addiction, while also performing leaderships roles. In addition to her laboratory and departmental efforts, Moghaddam brings extensive teaching and mentoring experience, and participates in a large array of outreach efforts and initiatives to promote women in science and young trainees to pursue careers in science.

== Awards and honors ==
- Dolores Shockley Award, ACNP
- Paul Jansen Award for Excellence in Schizophrenia Research
- Efron Award for Excellence in Research Related to Neuropsychopharmacology
- Collegium Internationale Neuro-Psychopharmacology Neuroscience Basic Research Award
- MERIT award from the National Institute of Mental Health
- Fogarty Senior Fellowship Award

== Books ==
KETAMINE *

== Select scientific publications ==
(full list)

- Del Arco, A., Park, J., Wood, J., Kim, Y., Moghaddam, B. (2017). Adaptive encoding of outcome prediction by prefrontal cortex ensembles supports behavioral flexibility. Journal of Neuroscience, 0450–17.
- Bueno-Junior, L.S., Simon, N.W., Wegener, M.A., Moghaddam, B. (2017). Repeated Nicotine Strengthens Gamma Oscillations in the Prefrontal Cortex and Improves Visual Attention Neuropsychopharmacology 42 (8), 1590–1598.
- Park, J., Moghaddam, B. (2017). Impact of anxiety on prefrontal cortex encoding of cognitive flexibility. Neuroscience 345, 193–202.
- Park, J., Wood, J., Bondi, C., Del Arco, A., and Moghaddam, B. (2016) Anxiety evokes hypofrontality and disrupts rule-relevant encoding by dorsomedial prefrontal cortex neurons. Journal of Neuroscience, 36(11): 3322–3335.
- Lohani, S., Poplawsky, A.J., Kim, S.G., and Moghaddam, B. (2017) Unexpected global impact of VTA dopamine neuron activation as measured by opto-fMRI. Molecular Psychiatry, doi:10.1038/mp.2016.102.
- Kim, Y., Simon, N.W., Wood, J., and Moghaddam, B. (2015). Reward anticipation is encoded differently by adolescent VTA neurons. Biological Psychiatry, 79(11):878-86.
- Moghaddam, B. and Gur, R.E. (2015). Women at the Podium: ACNP Strives to Reach Speaker Gender Equality at the Annual Meeting. Neuropsychopharmacology, 41(4):929-31.
- Sturman, D.A., Moghaddam, B. (2012) The striatum processes reward differently in adolescents versus adults. Proceedings of the National Academy of Sciences, 109(5): 1719–24.
- Darrah, J., Stefani, M.R., Moghaddam, B. (2008) Interaction of n-methyl-d-aspartate (NMDA) and group 5 metabotropic glutamate (mGlu5) receptors on behavioral flexibility using a novel operant set-shift paradigm. Behavioral Pharmacology, 19:225-234.
- Moghaddam, B. (2004) Targeting metabotropic glutamate receptors for treatment of cognitive symptoms of schizophrenia. Psychopharmacology, 174:39-44.
- Moghaddam, B. (2002) Stress activation of glutamate neurotransmission in the prefrontal cortex: Implications for dopamine-associated psychiatric disorders. Biological Psychiatry, 51:775-787.
- Moghaddam, B. (1993) Stress preferentially activates extraneuronal levels of excitatory amino acids in the prefrontal cortex: A comparison to hippocampus and basal ganglia. Journal of Neurochemistry, 60:1650-1657.
- Moghaddam, B., Roth, R.H., Bunney, B.S. (1990) Characterization of dopamine release in the rat prefrontal cortex as assessed by in vivo microdialysis: Comparison to the striatum. Neuroscience, 36:669-676.
- Moghaddam, B., Adams, R.N. (1987) Regional differences in resting extracellular potassium levels of rat brain. Brain Research, 406:337-340.
- Moghaddam, B., Schenk, J.O., Stewart, W.B., Hansen, A.J. (1987) Temporal relationship between neurotransmitter release and ion flux during spreading depression and anoxia. Canadian Journal of Physiology and Pharmacology, 65:1105-1110.

== Media coverage ==
- Huffington Post, 22 March 2016, “Anxiety Could Be The Reason You Made A Bad Decision.”
- Psychology Today, 17 March 2016, “How Does Anxiety Short Circuit the Decision-Making Process?”
- Forbes, 29 October 2012, “New Study Shows that Omega-3 Supplements Can Boost Memory in Young Adults.”
- March 2016, “Women at the Podium: ACNP Strives to Reach Speaker Gender Equality at the Annual Meeting.”
- SfN's first-ever podcast on "The Perils of Publishing"
- The Nation, 23 Mar 2022, “Breaking Off My Chemical Romance.” "
- This is Critical, 22 Jan 2021, “Is Ketamine all it's cracked up to be?” "

== Personal life ==
Moghaddam's father is from the city of Touyserkan and her mother from Tehran. Her father received a law degree from the University of Tehran in 1959 and served in the district attorney's office and then a judge for several decades. He is the author of several books in his native Persian including “Touyserkan” تويسركان on the history and culture of his birthplace. Moghaddam has been married to neuroscientist Charles W Bradberry since 1989. They have two children, Mazdak and Anahita.
