= Bita Lake =

Plateau lake in Pudacuo National Park, China

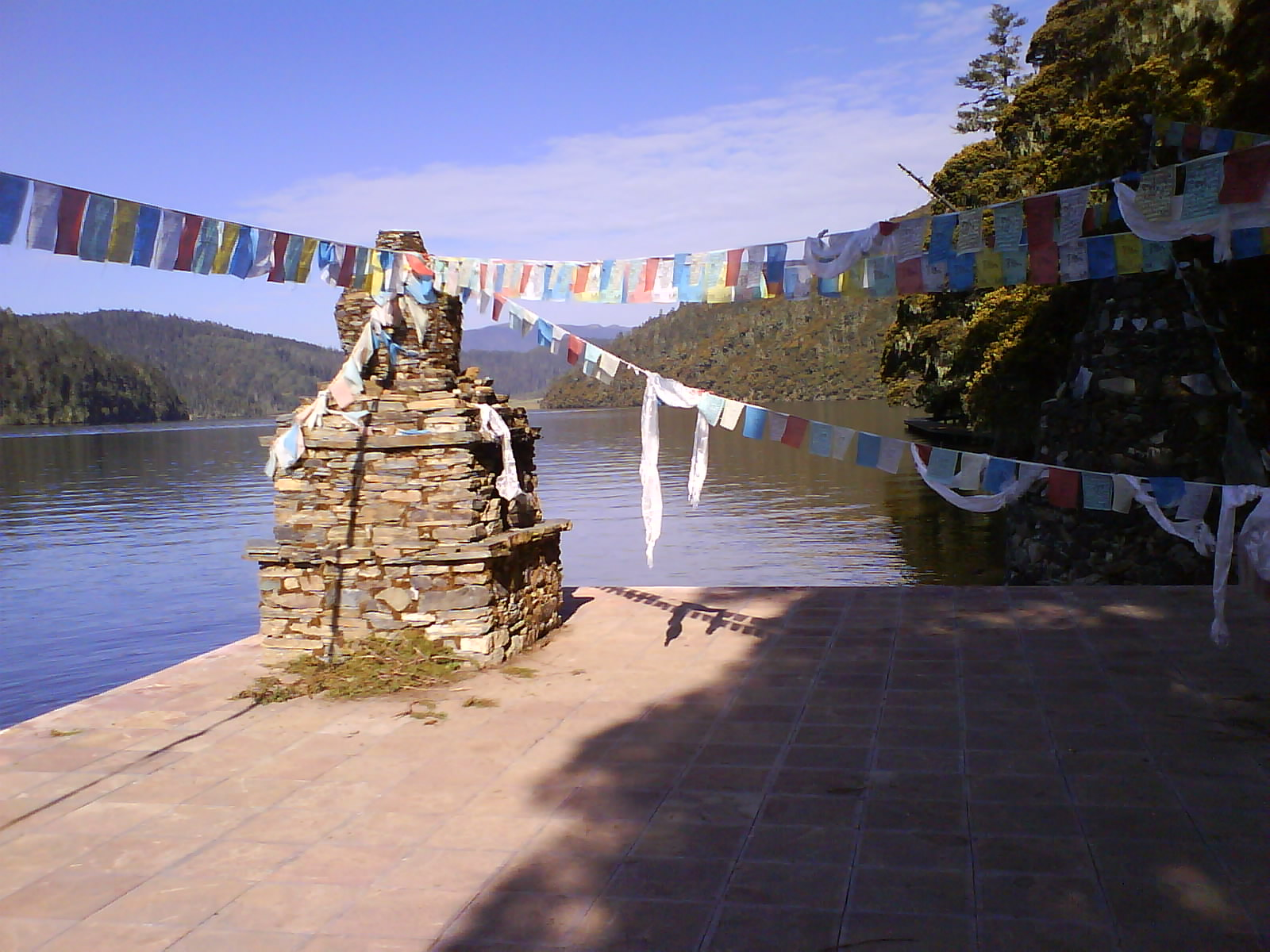

- Location within Yunnan
- Coordinates: 27°49′30″N 99°59′00″E
- Basin countries: China
- Max. length: 2.8 km (2 mi)
- Max. width: 1.3 km (1 mi)
- Surface area: 1.4 km^{2} (0 sq mi)
- Max. depth: 40 m (131 ft)
- Surface elevation: 3,539 m (11,611 ft)

Bita Lake (Chinese: 碧塔海, Tibetan: བས་སཐའ་མཆོ།, Wylie: bas mthav mtsho) is a plateau lake in Shangri-La County, Yunnan Province, southwest of China. The lake is located in Pudacuo National Park and has a total area of about 1.4 square kilometers, with an elevation of 3539 m.
