= Bita Elahian =

Iranian-American filmmaker and actress

Bita Elahian (Alahyan)
- بیتا الهیان
- Born: Tehran, Iran
- Education: New York Film Academy (BFA)
- Occupations: Filmmaker and Actress
- Years active: 2009–present

Bita Elahian (Alahyan) (Persian: بیتا الهیان), is an Iranian-American filmmaker and actress who lives in Los Angeles, California. She studied filmmaking at the New York Film Academy (NYFA). Elahian has received various awards for her directing in drama films. She is a member of Women in Film LA and New York Women in Film & Television.

== Early life ==
Bita Elahian was born in Tehran, where she lived for much of her childhood.

== Career ==
Bita Elahian began her film career in the Middle East. She gained popularity as both an actress and a theatre director. She directed a performance of Crimes of the Heart. She also directed a rendition called Lobby, which was featured during the Fajr International theatre Festival in Iran.

Later in her career, Elahian decided to transition from theatre to filmmaking. She created a movie entitled The Seventh Day, which was aired at over 20 film festivals.

Elahian moved to the US to advance her career as a movie director. As a student at the New York Film Academy, she directed Beautiful Dream and Blame as part of her coursework. Vida is her latest short film, which she directed and acted in.

She was also a member of the selection committee of the Winter Film Awards.

== Influence ==
Her work focuses on women's empowerment. Currently, she is a member of New York Women in Film & Television and Women in Film LA.

== Filmography ==
- Short Films:

Year	Title	Role
2014	The Seventh Day	Director
2015	Hills Like White Elephants Cafe	Actress
2016	Beautiful Dream	Director
2016	Red Rose	Assistant Director
2016	An Ideal Marriage	Actress ,Assistant Director
2017	Blame	Director, Executive Producer, Writer
2018	X	Actress
2019	Vida	Actress, Director, Executive producer, Writer

== Performances ==
Year	Title	Role
2011	Lobby	Director
2009	Crimes of the Heart	Director
2013	De Jerusalén a Jericó	Director

== Awards and nominations ==
- Vida (Short Film)
  - OFFICIAL SELECTION
    1. The Valley Film Festival 2019 "Los Angeles"
    2. Awareness Festival 2019
    3. KRAF 2019
    4. Indie & Foreign Film Festival 2019 "New York" (WON : The Best Narrative Short Film School Student)
    5. Goa Short Film Festival 2019
    6. Fort Myers Beach International Film Festival 2020
    7. San Diego Film Week 2020
    8. Sensus Film Festival 2020
    9. Through Women's Eyes International Film Festival 2020
    10. Los Angeles Women's International Doc Fest 2020
    11. The Women's Film Festival 2020
    12. World of Woman Film Fair Middle East 2020
    13. International Migration Film Festival 2020
- Blame (Short Film)
  - OFFICIAL SELECTION
    1. Other Venice Film Festival 2017
    2. Los Angeles Movie Awards 2017 (WON : Honorable Mention)
    3. One Reeler Short Film Competition 2017
      - (WON : Award of Excellence)
      - (WON : The Best Actor)
    4. The Best Shorts Competition 2017
      - (WON : Award of Merit - Women Filmmakers(Student))
      - (WON : Film Short (Student))
    5. California Women's Film Festival 2018 (WON : 3rd Place Audience Award)
    6. International Movie Awards 2018
      - (WON : GOLD AWARDS - Director)
      - (WON : PLATINUM AWARDS - International Short Film )
      - (WON : AWARDS OF MERIT - Editor)
    7. Marina Del Rey Film Festival 2018
    8. Hollywood Art & Movie Awards 2018
    9. 48 Independent Short Film Festival 2017
    10. Logcinema Art Films 2018
    11. Utah Film Festival 2018
- Beautiful Dream (Short Film)
  - OFFICIAL SELECTION
    1. Spotlight Horror Film Awards 2016 (WON : The Best Drama Short)
    2. Los Angeles Film Awards 2017 (WON; Honorable Mention: Indie Film)
    3. Hollywood Film Competition 2017 (WON : The Best Drama Film)
    4. Women's Only Entertainment Film Festival 2017 (WON : The Best Female Director)
    5. Mindfield Film Festival "Los Angeles" 2017 (WON : Platinum Award - Best Student Short)
    6. Top Shorts 2017 (WON : Best Student Film)
    7. Colortape Film Festival, AUS 2017 (WON : Best Short Film)
    8. Festigious International Film Competition 2017 (WON :Best Drama)
    9. Short to the Point International Film Festival 2017
    10. Mindfield Film Festival Albuquerque 2017 (WON: Best Short Film)
    11. Lake View International Film Festival 2017
    12. IMA International Film Festival (India) 2017
    13. Barcelona Planet Film Festival 2017
    14. Aab International Film Festival (AIFF) 2017
    15. The European Independent Award 2017
    16. Gold Movie Awards Goddess Nike 2018
    17. Festival Silhouette 2018 (WON : Semi-Finalist)

- The seventh day (Short Film)
  - OFFICIAL SELECTION
    1. Third Eye 14 Asian Film Festival 2015
    2. Kolkata International Film Festival 2015
    3. 6th Iran Cinema Celebration 2015
    4. 32nd Tehran International short Film Festival 2015
    5. Direct Short and Documentary Film Festival 2015
    6. 12th Akbank Short Film Festival 2016
    7. Yari Persian Film Festival 2016
    8. I Filmmaker International Film Festival 2016 "Special Mention"
    9. ُShort to the Point 2017
