= Alfonso Perugini =

Italian actor, film director and journalist

- Occupations: actor; film director; journalist

Alfonso Perugini is an Italian actor, film director and journalist.

== Career ==
In the United States, in 2015, he directed New York, a romantic comedy on the independent circuit. After returning to Italy he directed two more films: Enigma Finale (2016) and 45 - Good Wine (2017).

In 2019 he was the protagonist in two web series, Garganta and Hotblade, of which he is also a producer.

In 2020 he was cast by Paolo Sorrentino as the set designer Dante Ferretti in the film The Hand of God.

In the same year he was in the cast of the comedy film direct-to-video Tra le righe ("Between the lines"), distributed on Amazon Prime Video by director Brando Improta and candidated to the 2022 edition of David di Donatello.

In 2023 he co-starred in the film Mafia Mamma, a comedy directed by Catherine Hardwicke.

== Filmography ==
=== Film director ===
- Drops of memory (2009)
- Alberto Sordi: Il mostro della Commedia all'italiana (2010) - Documentary
- Stalking (2011)
- HidIng eVe (2011)
- Moyna (2012)
- Above Suspicion (2013)
- The Betrayal (2013)
- How To Kill My Girlfriend (2013)
- How To Kill My Boyfriend (2014)
- Meddlers (2014)
- New York (2015)
- Enigma Finale (2016)
- 45 - Good Wine (2017)

=== Actor ===
- I Cesaroni, by Francesco Vicario (2011) Canale 5
- Magnifici: Re-boot!, by Alfonso Perugini (2011)
- Discoteque, by Al Festa (2012)
- The Betrayal, byAlfonso Perugini & Tushar Tyagi (2013)
- The last day of Emma N. by Frank Rivera (2013)
- Tràfico, by Joseph A. Eulo (2014)
- New York, by Alfonso Perugini (2015)
- Silence is golden, by Panita Chanrasmi Lefebvre (2015)
- La notte dei desideri, by Brando Improta (2016)
- Enigma Finale, by Alfonso Perugini (2016)
- 45 - Good Wine by Alfonso Perugini (2017)
- Garganta by Modestino Di Nenna (2019)
- Hotblade by Luigi Borriello (2019)
- Passpartù - Operazione Doppiozero, by Lucio Bastolla (2019)
- Maccio contro i pregiudizi, by Maccio Capatonda (2021)
- Tra le righe, by Brando Improta (2021)
- The Hand of God, by Paolo Sorrentino (2021)
- Mafia Mamma by Catherine Hardwicke (2023)
- Flowless by Brando Improta (2024)
- L'algoritmo della felicità by Brando Improta (2025)

=== Voice ===
- Definitely Gangster by Jeremy Lee MacKenzie (2023)

=== Producer ===
- Terra desolata, by Mario Savo (2008) (executive producer)
- Hotblade, by Luigi Borriello (2019) (co-producer)
- La maledizione dei Potter, di Jessica Anna Festa (2021) (executive producer)

== Prizes ==
- Prize Comitato Tricolore per gli Italiani nel Mondo - Special Mention (2013)
- Prize Pasquale Stiso - Cinema section (2023)
