= Vostochny Port =

Intermodal container port in the eastern end of the Trans-Siberian Railway

Coordinates: 42°44′29.27″N 133°4′47.27″E

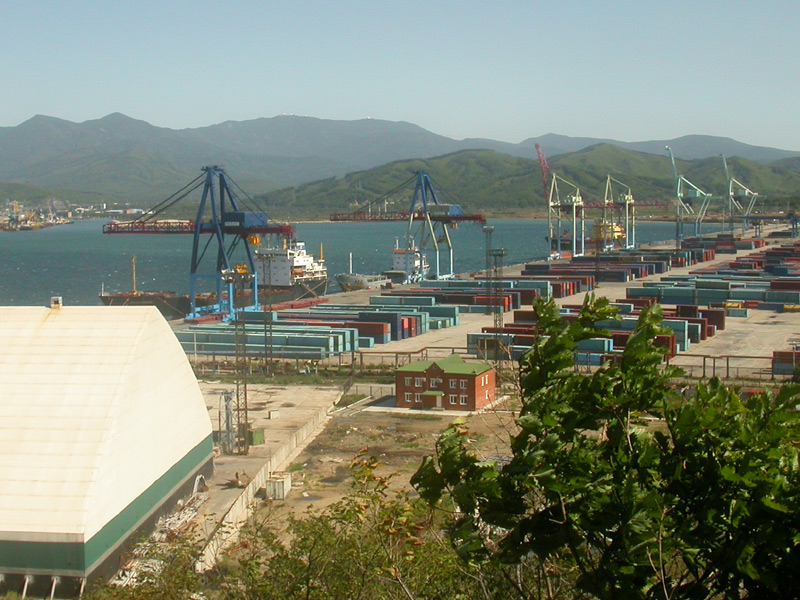
Container terminal in Vostochny Port

Vostochny Port (Russian: Восто́чный порт) is an intermodal container port at the eastern end of the Trans-Siberian Railway. It is the largest port in the Russian Far East. It is located in Vrangel (an eastern suburb of Nakhodka), Primorsky Krai. A deepwater port on Nakhodka Bay (part of the Sea of Japan), it operates year-round and is suitable for handling large tonnage ships. Vostochny is a warm-water port in the Russian Far East.

The largest stevedoring firm in the port is JSC Vostochny Port, which specializes in coal handling with conveyor equipment.

Vostochny Port also consists of VostCo Dry Dock, which was the construction site of the concrete gravity base structures LUN-A and PA-B for the development of the Sakhalin Island offshore oil fields.

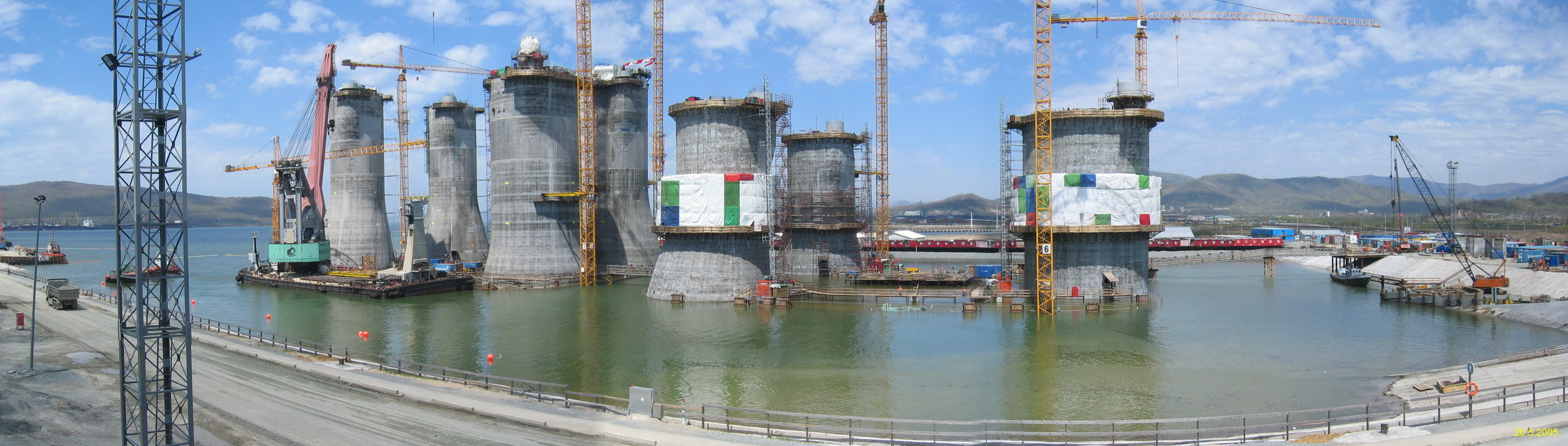
LUN-A and PA-B concrete GBS tow up.

Another division of Vostochny port is the Special Sea Oil Terminal, the location of the eastern terminus of the Eastern Siberia-Pacific Ocean pipeline which is located in Kozmino Bay, with cargo throughput of almost 15 million tonnes.
