= Offensive against Narva (1658) =

Russian attack and blockade of Narva in 1658

- Part of the Russo-Swedish War (1656–1658)
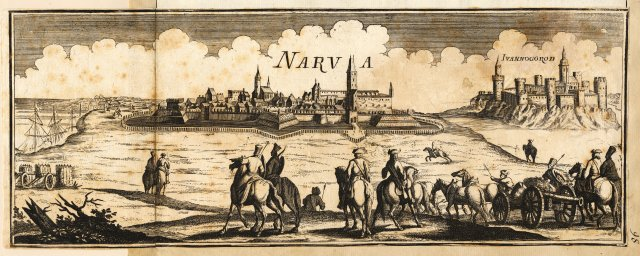
- Depiction of Narva by Johann Christoph Brotze from Sammlung verschiedner Liefländischer Monumente
Date	1658
Location	Narva, Swedish Estonia
Result	Swedish victory
Territorial changes	Russian withdrawal from Narva

Belligerents
(yes) Swedish Empire	Tsardom of Russia

Commanders and leaders
(Swedish Empire) Krister Horn	(Tsardom of Russia) Ivan Andreyevich Khovansky

Units involved
(Swedish Empire) Narva garrison	Unknown

Strength
c. 1,600 men	1,650–5,000 men

Casualties and losses
Unknown	Unknown

The Offensive against Narva occurred during the last stages of the Russo-Swedish War of 1656–1658. The Russians, under the command of Ivan Andreyevich Khovansky, advanced on Narva with 1,900 men, ravaging the lands around Narva.

== Background ==
Following the successful Swedish relief of Jama in March, Russia withdrew most of its raiders from western Ingria. Along with this, they also executed all of their prisoners, which was a frequent precaution on both sides during the war. Instead, the Russian forces gathered for an attack on Narva. Moreover, Ivan Andreyevich Khovansky had, already before the relief of Jama, set out to reinforce the Russians at Jama. After the relief, he instead changed course towards Narva.

== Offensive ==
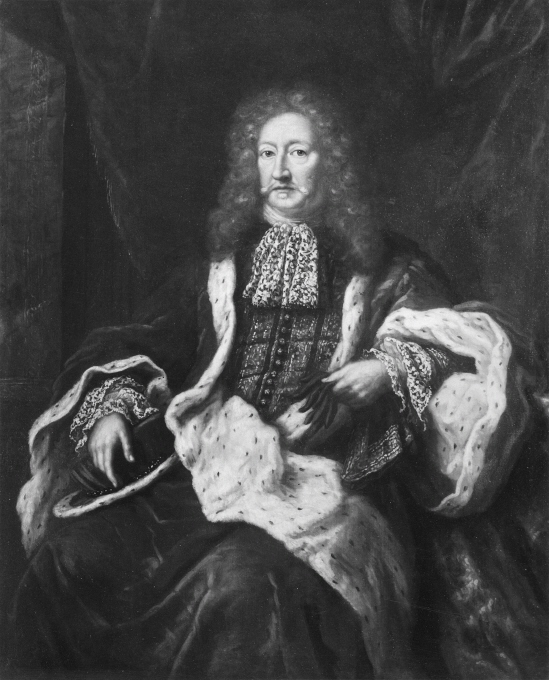
Portrait of Christer Horn by David Klöcker Ehrenstrahl

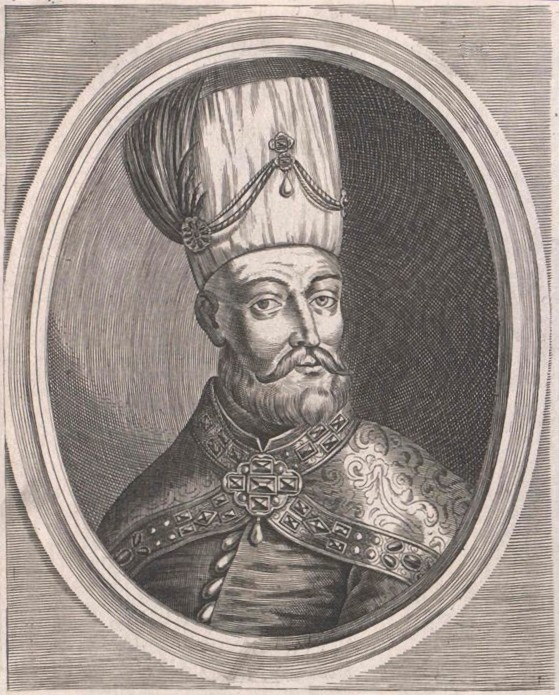
Engraving of Ivan Khovansky by an unknown author

The Russian offensive against Narva became the last Russian attack against Swedish objectives in the war. Khovansky advanced towards the city with 1,650, 1,900, 4,000 men, or 5,000 men. However, Solntsev and his Novgorod soldiers refused to join the offensive, instead going back towards Jama. In late March, Khovansky reached Narva, and sent his Don cossacks and four companies of cavalry to ravage the countryside between Narva and Reval, also to disperse the peasant levies being raised by Sweden there. When the Russians tried advancing closer to Narva, they were quickly repulsed by cannon fire and retired to a camp a bit farther away at Joala, from where they initiated a blockade of Narva.

According to Khovansky's intelligence, the Swedes had some 1,600 men in Narva under the command of Christer Horn, and the two sides appeared equal in strength. Additionally, news soon arrived that Sweden had made peace with Denmark in the Treaty of Roskilde, which was bad news for the Russians, as they had to assume Sweden would deploy more substantial forces to the Russian front.

By this time, negotiations between Russian and Swedish representatives were already underway in Moscow for a ceasefire agreement. As a result, a local truce was agreed to in early April, but in late April, Horn revoked the truce. Soon afterwards, Tsar Alexei ordered Khovansky to initiate a new ceasefire with Horn, and one was soon agreed to. In early May, Khovansky abandoned the blockade against Narva and withdrew to Pskov, although he did not remove his garrison at Wask-Narva.

== Aftermath ==
In Moscow, negotiations between the Russians and Swedes had continued for some time, and on 10 May, they finally concluded a general ceasefire, set to come into force on 31 May. Additionally, it was agreed that negotiations for an armistice would begin on 25 June in Narva, with peace negotiations scheduled for November. Tsar Alexei ordered the Russian outposts to cease operations and inform their Swedish counterparts of the ceasefire. Due to the poor roads, it took a while for the news to reach all the combatants. However, already by mid-May, Russian merchants had shown up outside Narva with their goods. While Christer Horn did not allow them to enter the town, they were allowed to trade outside it. On 21 May, Horn also received news of the ceasefire.

== Works cited ==
- Fagerlund, Rainer (1979). Stade, Arne (ed.). Kriget på östfronten [The War on the Eastern Front] (in Swedish). Militärhistoriska förlaget. ISBN 9789185266098.
- Essen, Michael Fredholm von (2023). Charles X's Wars: Volume 3 - The Danish Wars, 1657-1660. Helion & Company. ISBN 9781915113603.
- Ignatius, Karl Emil Ferdinand (1865). Finlands historia under Karl X Gustafs regering [History of Finland during the reign of Karl X Gustaf] (in Swedish). Edlund. pp. 82–83.
