= Vrangel =

Urban locality in Primorsky Krai, Russia

Coordinates: 42°43′47″N 133°05′02″E

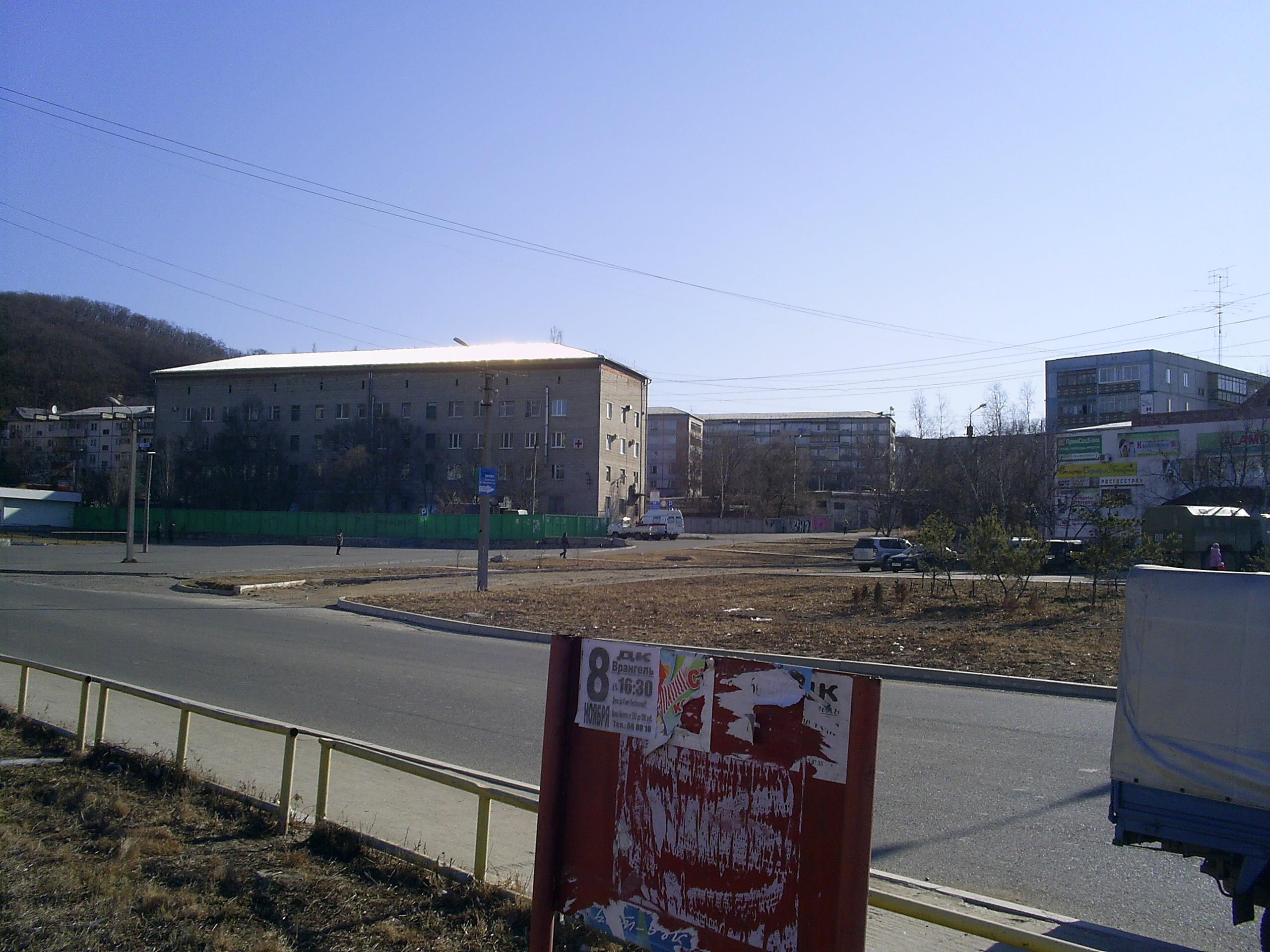
Vrangel, near Vostochny Port

Vrangel (Russian: Вра́нгель) was an urban locality (an urban-type settlement) in Primorsky Krai, Russia, located on east coast of Nakhodka Bay. Its foundation date is unknown. On December 1, 2004 it was merged with the city of Nakhodka. Population: 15,346 (2002 census); 12,814 (1989 Soviet census).

Vostochny Port, one of Russia's largest ports, is located near Vrangel.
