= Port Management Company =

Russian stevedore company

Port Management Company LLC
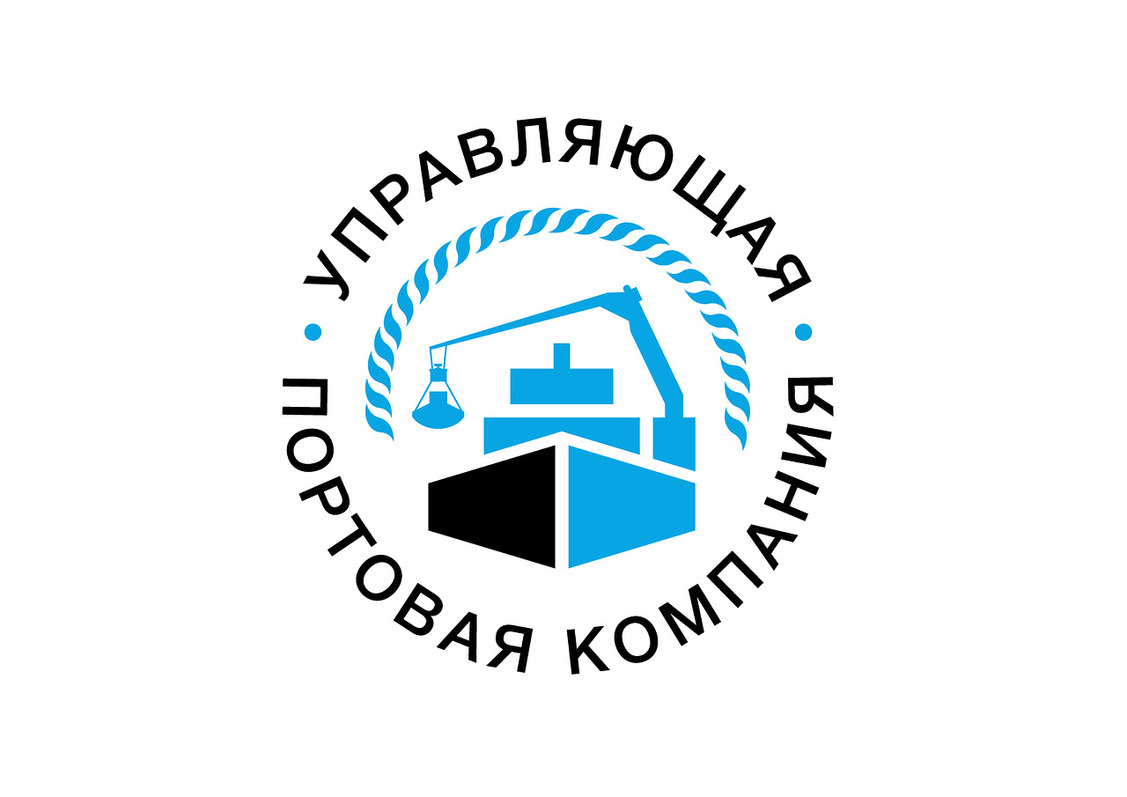
- Type: Limited Liability Company
- Industry: Stevedoring activity, coal ports
- Founded: 2008
- Headquarters: Moscow, Russia
- Key people: Anton Pyatkov (General Director); Irina Olkhovskaya (Deputy General Director for Prospective Development and Work with Federal Authorities)
- Website: portmanagement.ru

Port Management Company (Russian: Управляющая портовая компания, romanized: Upravlyayushchaya portovaya kompaniya) is a Russian stevedore company serving as the exclusive executive authority for the specialized coal sea ports of Russia located in the Far East (Vostochny Port JSC, Wrangel Bay, Primorsky Territory) and in the Baltic Sea region (Rosterminalugol JSC, Ust-Luga, Leningrad region).

== History ==
The company was founded on 26 November 2008. Starting from 2009, it has been managing the operational activity of JSC 'Vostochny Port'. Between 2010 and 2015, the equipment of the port and its production processes were updated. Between 2009 and 2016, the annual freight turnover of the port increased 1.5 times from 14.7 million tonnes to 23.5 million tonnes.

In 2012, JSC 'Vostochny Port' began constructing the third stage of the coal terminal, which will be put into operation in September 2017. It will increase the annual terminal capacity up to 39 million tonnes in 2019. The project is funded solely by the company, without state financing. The total amount of investment in the project is 27 billion Rubles.

In July 2016, the federal antitrust service satisfied the application of Managing Port Company for the rights to act as the executive body of the coal seaport JSC 'Rosterminalugol'. The freight turnover of JSC 'Rosterminalugol' at the end of 2016 had reached 18 million tonnes.

After the consolidation of specialized assets, the company manages the biggest Russian coal port holding, with a total cargo turnover of 41.5 million tonnes of coal per year, which constitutes more than one-third of Russian sea exports of coal. In the year 2019, the total annual freight turnover of specialized coal sea terminals of JSC "Vostochny Port" and JSC'Rosterminalugol' will reach 56.6 million tonnes.

According to information from the Sea Trade Port Association, the freight turnover of the coal port holding company ranks third place among all stevedoring assets with the largest holdings, with 5.8% of the country's cargo turnover.

== Stevedoring activity ==
The coal seaports of the company allow access to more than 30 countries in Europe, the Middle East, the Asia-Pacific region, and Latin America. The management of two highly productive coal ports designed for different export markets ensures the prompt switch of cargo flows in case of changes in the world coal market, and it allows for the rhythmic loading of port facilities.

Taking into account the increase in port freight turnover by 20 million tonnes in the future cargo base of JSC 'Vostochny Port' and JSC 'Rosterminalugol', these companies have secured agreements with coal manufacturers from various coal basins. The ports perform the transshipment of coal produced by OJSC 'UK 'Kusbassrazrezugol', JSC 'SUEK', OJSC 'Kuzbasskaya toplivnaya companiya', JSC Russian Coal, CJSC 'Sibuglemet', 'Promugolservice' LLC, CJSC 'Shakhta Belovskaya', 'Razrez Stepanovky' LLC, 'Razrez Bungursky Severny' LLC, 'Razrez Arshanovsky' LLC, "Razrez 'Kiyzassky' LLC, 'Razrez Vostochny' LLC, and other Russian manufacturers.

During the 2nd East Economic Forum (EEF) held in Vladivostok in September 2016, an agreement was signed on the transshipment of coal produced by MC 'Kolmar' for an annual supply of 2 million tonnes of coal starting from 2017, after the commissioning of the third stage of the JSC 'Vostochny Port' terminal.

The policy of the coal port holding is aimed at creating open access to the sea gates of Russia for small, medium, and large coal companies, to ensure a competitive environment and dynamic growth of the coal industry for the increase in transshipment and loading of port facilities. The cooperation with JSC 'Russian Railways' in the development of railroad infrastructure and railways near ports, as well as the use of innovative high-capacity wagons, which constitute more than 60% of the total volume of transportation of JSC 'Vostochny Port' and JSC'Rosterminalugol', contributes to the increase in cargo turnover at the ports.

== Managed companies ==
JSC Vostochny Port (Wrangel Bay, Primorsky Territory) is a port with open access, which specializes in the transshipment of coal for export by applying automatic conveyor equipment. During 2016, the company reloaded 23.5 million tonnes of products, which constitutes around 30% of the total freight turnover of Far East coal ports and around 20% of the freight turnover of all coal ports in Russia. The volume of transshipment is fully provided by coal produced throughout Russia - in the Kuzbass, Eastern Siberia and the Far East.

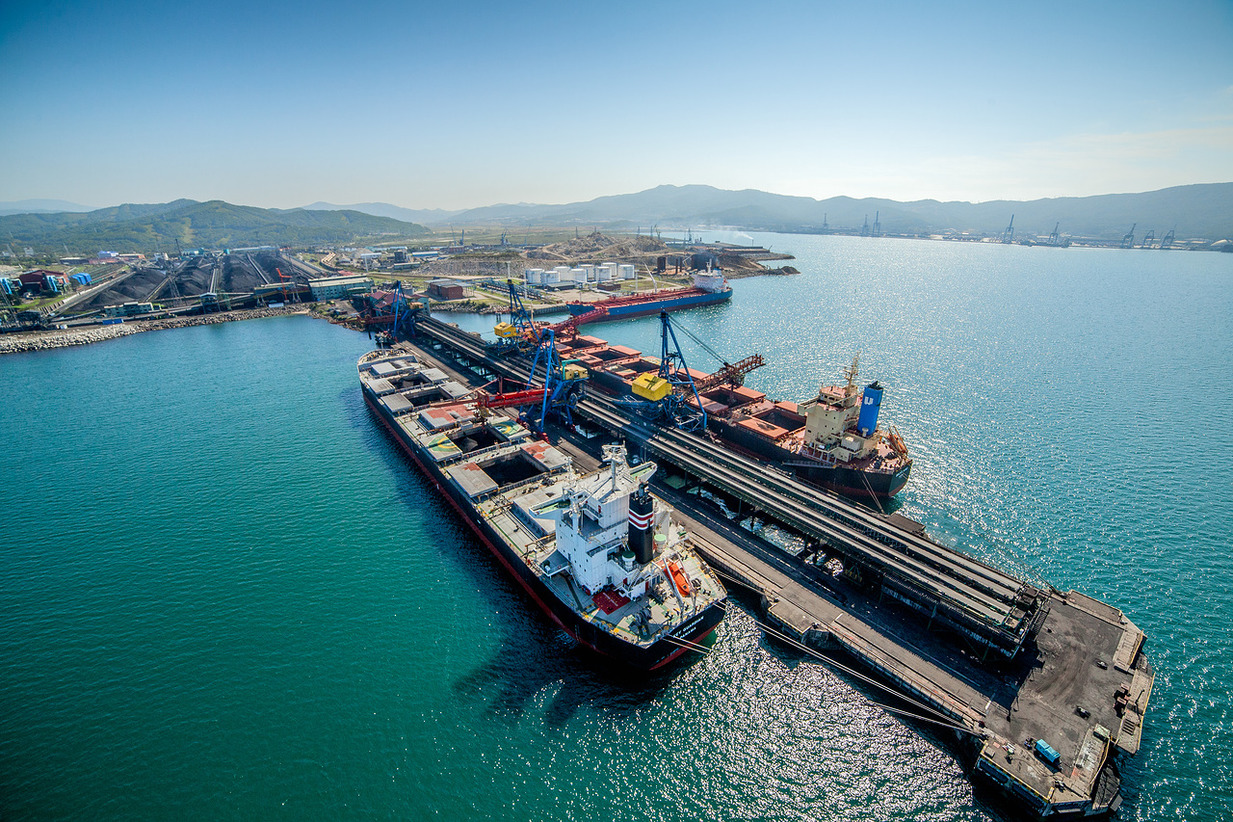
Loading of coal. JSC Vostochny Port

For the processing of coal, JSC 'Vostochny Port' uses equipment made by leading world manufacturers. As the result of years of modernization of the specialized coal complex, the stevedore has managed to reach 100% automation of its work processes. It is the only terminal in Primorsky Kray capable of accepting vessels of the capesize-type with a tonnage of up to 180 thousand tonnes. The activity of the port meets the requirements of the international standard ISO 9001:2008 "Quality management systems. Requirements".

The high capacity and speed of cargo processing are achieved by specialized equipment used at every stage. The upload of coal is performed at the upload station equipped with 2 tandem railcar dumpers, machines for wagon defrosting with a capacity of 80 gondolas, a wind protection system with infrared heating of wagons, a drill-flushing complex, conveyor equipment systems and the system for the refilling of frozen coal. Warehousing is carried out by specialized equipment, including 4 reclaimers, 2 stackers, bulldozers, and loaders. The loading of vessels is done with the help of 4 shiploaders (the productivity of each of them reaches 3 thousand tonnes per hour) and other auxiliary equipment.

In 2016, the port installed a multistage system of magnetic coal cleaning developed by the specialists of JSC 'Vostochny Port'. The system is represented by 34 units of high-tech equipment, including 26 magnetic separators, 4 suspended magnets and 4 electromagnetic drums.

In 2012, Managing Port Company LLC launched a privately financed project to expand JSC Vostochny Port's coal complex. The expansion added a fully automated terminal capable of transferring, storing, and processing at least 20 million tons of coal annually.

The project includes constructing four warehouses with a combined capacity of 780 thousand tonnes alongside two docking facilities. Additionally, the complex will be equipped with advanced technology. Currently, more than 19 billion Rubles have been invested of the planned 27 billion Rubles, an artificial land plot has been created, and a docking facility has been built. The new coal terminal will be equipped with the most productive modern equipment supplied from Japan: two tandem railcar dumpers for innovative high-capacity wagons that allow the unloading of four 70-tonne wagons of coal in just 3 minutes, two stokers, and four reclaimers with a capacity of 3,500 thousand tonnes per hour.

In September 2016, the construction of docking facility No. 51 of JSC 'Vostochny Port', erected as part of the third stage of the coal terminal development project, was completed. During the 2nd Eastern Economic Forum, JSC 'Vostochny Port' was visited by the delegation of the Ministry of Transport of the Russian Federation, headed by Transport Minister Maxim Sokolov, who gave a positive assessment of the project and the degree of its readiness. The implementation of the investment project of the third stage of JSC 'Vostochny Port' will guarantee timely and high-quality processing of the ever-growing coal cargo flows coming from BAM and Transsib and will increase trade with countries of the Asia-Pacific region. During the exhibition, 'Russian Transport-2016' the Russian Prime Minister Dmitry Medvedev becomes acquainted with the implementation of the third stage of the project. The government leader noted that it was a good time to expand port capacities.

In December 2016, JSC 'Vostochny Port' became a resident of the Free Port of Vladivostok. The volume of investment in the project under the agreement with the Corporation for the Development of the Far East will amount to 17.2 billion Rubles, with the prospect of creating 619 jobs. The benefits received by the port due to its residence in the Free Port of Vladivostok will allow for the channelling of additional funds for the development of the company.

The increase in capacity of JSC 'Vostochny Port' with the commissioning of the third stage of the port requires the simultaneous development of the capacity of the railway tracks. JSC 'Russian Railways', Managing Port Company LLC and JSC 'Vostochny Port' jointly modernize the railway lines for public and private use at the station 'Nakhodka-Vostochnaya'. The development program of JSC 'Vostochny Port' provides for the construction of a new private railway park and the large-scale development of a public railway station. The construction of a new range station will increase the volume of wagons received with coal and the departure of empty rolling stock after unloading. The construction of the railway infrastructure is financed by Managing Port Company LLC and JSC 'Vostochny Port'. The size of the investment in the project is 5 billion Rubles. Built for the development of Nakhodka-Vostochnaya, the federal infrastructure will be transferred to JSC 'Russian Railways' free of charge. After the completion of construction, the station's capacity will reach 39 million tonnes per year, counting only the cargo of JSC 'Vostochny Port', without taking into account the cargo of other recipients who will also be able to use the new federal infrastructure. A positive evaluation of the implemented project was given by the President of JSC 'Russian Railways' Oleg Belozerov during the signing of the agreement on cooperation between the transport operator and JSC 'Vostochny Port'.

During the 2nd Eastern Economic Forum, JSC 'Russian Railways'' and JSC 'Vostochny Port' signed the agreement on improving the technology of coal transportation, prioritizing the use of innovative high-capacity wagons for organizing heavy traffic.

Rosterminalugol JSC is the largest specialized coal terminal in the Northwest of Russia, which initiated the development of the seaport of Ust-Luga. In January 2006, in the presence of the President of the Russian Federation Vladimir Putin, the second start-up complex of a coal terminal with a design capacity of 4 million tonnes of coal per year was put into operation. The port accounts for more than 60% of coal transshipment out of the total cargo turnover of ports in the Northwest. In 2016, the freight turnover of Rosterminalugol JSC increased by 3.4% and amounted to 18.1 million tonnes. As of November 23, 2016, 120 million tonnes of coal had been loaded onto the vessel 'Zagreb' since the beginning of the terminal's operation.

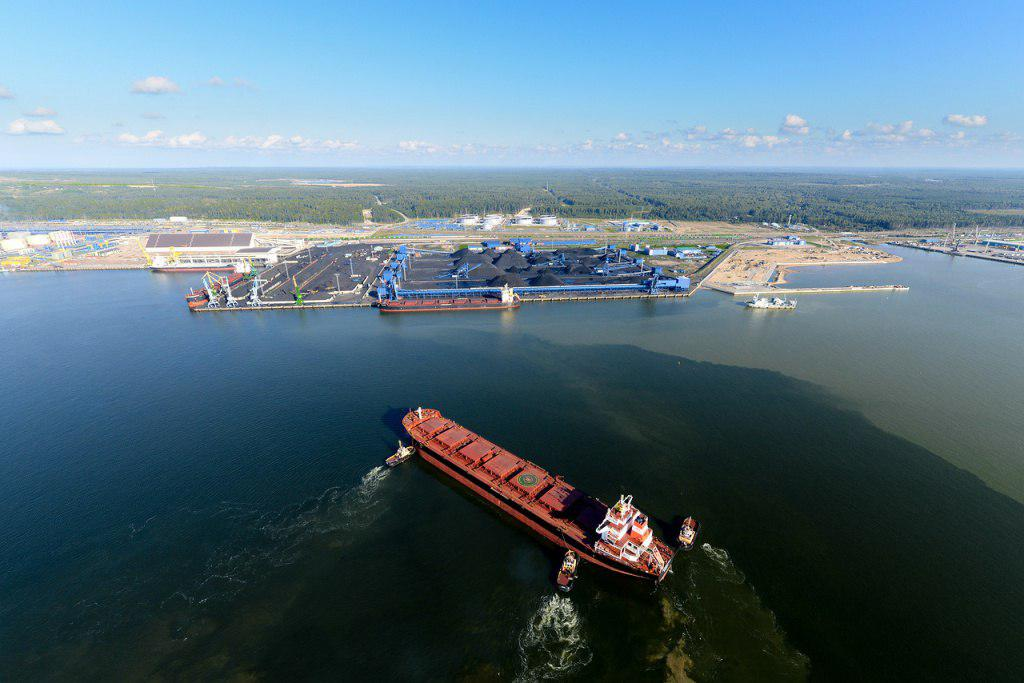
Rosterminalugol JSC bird's-eye

The port implements an automated process of transferring coal from rail to sea transport, cleaning coal from accidental inclusions, refining coal to its required fraction, and continuous sampling of coal products immediately before loading. Rosterminalugol JSC has implemented an information system that allows for the monitoring of production processes, the maintenance of operational records and the exchange of information with JSC 'Russian Railways' in real time. The largest cargo receivers are Norway, Great Britain, Germany, Spain, Italy, Slovenia, Finland, Brazil, Israel, Turkey and other countries.

The port uses automated equipment: railcar dumpers, stackers, reclaimers, a conveyor system, shiploaders, a multistage magnetic coal cleaning system and automatic sampling devices. All the main centres of the terminal are equipped with a video surveillance system. The unloading of wagons with coal in Rosterminalugol JSC is carried out with the help of two modern high-tech railcar dumpers, which allow for the unloading of 4 gondolas simultaneously in less than 3 minutes. At the same time, the rolling stock does not suffer any mechanical damage, which is possible with clamshell unloading. In order to quickly organize empty stock on the terminal routes for the first time in Russia, transborders were used and successfully operated. With their assistance it is possible to accelerate the supply of rolling stock to several parallel tracks without the use of additional switches. The specialized coal terminal uses devices for defrosting wagons equipped with infrared emitters in order to ensure the uninterrupted unloading of loaded wagons in wintertime. Next, unloading coal lands on a conveyor belt through a grid with cells 280 mm in diameter. Further, after passing through the aspiration facility, according to the conveyor system, coal is automatically transported to either one of the four warehouses or directly to the ship, depending on the loading scheme.

The loading of vessels is carried out by two high-performance ship loading machines on two docking facilities, which allow for the simultaneous handling of two panamax class vessels.

The increase in the port's freight turnover remains one of the main goals of the terminal, in addition to the increase in quality of services provided: ensuring an uninterrupted chain of supply and shipment to the most efficient types of vessels for the development of new routes to supply Russian coal. The sorting facility of the Luzhskaya-Sortirovochnaya rail station installed by JSC 'Russian Railways' plays an important role in this process. The port employs new technology connected with the protection of environment and health of employees.

== Port environment ==
The Port Management Company and the ports it manages (including Rosterminalugol JSC and JSC Vostochny Port) have implemented a long-term environmental program to improve the safety of stevedoring activities. This program focuses on complying with international ecological standards, such as ISO 14001:2004 for cargo transshipment in seaports.

=== Air and Water Quality Management ===
- Strong aspiration systems are used to capture dust at coal handling facilities.
- Air and water quality are regularly monitored to ensure they stay within acceptable ranges.
- Wastewater treatment facilities are used to treat wastewater before it is released, meeting the standards for fisheries.
- Rosterminalugol JSC is upgrading its wastewater treatment facilities to minimize discharge and improve cleaning efficiency using advanced technologies.

=== Marine Resource Restoration ===
- JSC Vostochny Port has a program to cultivate and release marine life like kelp, trepang, scallops, and young Keta salmon into the Peter the Great Gulf.

=== Environmental Monitoring and Improvement ===
- Both ports have environmental engineers on staff who conduct regular monitoring and audits.
- Rosterminalugol JSC has invested in tree planting and released fish fingerlings into a local river to replenish natural resources.
- The company has invested over 200 million rubles between 2014 and 2016 on environmental initiatives.

=== Collaboration ===
- A five-year agreement was signed in December 2016 between JSC Vostochny Port, Rosterminalugol JSC, and local governments to collaborate on improving environmental safety and promoting environmental education.

== Social responsibility ==
Two companies, Managing Port Company LLC and JSC 'Vostochny Port', funded the opening of a new oncology department in Nakhodka city hospital in November 2016. This department provides comprehensive medical services to patients from Nakhodka and surrounding areas. The hospital was renovated and equipped with modern endoscopic technology. The new department offers various services including consultations, procedures, and a day hospital. It is intended to serve as a regional oncology center for the broader population.
