= Subfluvial tunnel ESPO and Lena River =

Subfluvial tunnel ESPO and Lena River is a bridge that carries the Eastern Siberia–Pacific Ocean oil pipeline across the Lena River. The Eastern Siberia–Pacific Ocean oil pipeline is a 1,755 kilometres (1,091 mi) long oil pipeline. It is between the confluence with the Olyokma River and Soljanka village.

== Building method and design ==
Bridge characteristics
Width
Width of Lena River	1,440 metres (4,720 ft)
Culvet length	1,598 metres (5,243 ft)
Total length including coastal sites	3,700 metres (12,100 ft)
Depth
Depth of bottom	6.8 metres (22 ft)
Depth of underwater trench of oil pipeline	12 metres (39 ft)

Builders initially chose a tunnel for this crossing, based on horizontal drilling. Instead, they eventually decided to build a culvert, laying an oil pipeline in a trench.

According to designers of Transneft, the building of the underwater crossing is ecologically safe. The decision on the use of open cut river and stream crossing is based on studies performed by employees of Transneft of possible ways of crossing a waterway, proceeding from geological and hydrological conditions of a section of the Lena River. According to engineers of Transneft, this crossing is unique in reliability. In addition, pump station number 14 is on the bank of the Lena river right after the bridge. This measure lowers pressure in the pipe.

The underwater piece of the oil pipeline is a pipe riveted to a wood lath. Over the lath are pig-iron pipeline weights.

- The thickness of a wall of a pipe on a site of underwater transition of the main oil pipeline is 29 millimetres (1.1 in).
- Strength of a used steel above, than at analogues on 15%.

The first attempt to construct the crossing was made in the summer of 2008, but the water lever was high and construction work was halted.

The crossing was constructed from the end of March to the beginning of April 2009. Workers worked on placing a section of oil pipeline in a trench that had been cut from the ice of the Lena River.
