= Vostochny Port (company) =

Russian stevedoring company

JSC “Vostochny Port”
- Company type: Joint Stock Company
- Industry: Stevedoring, activity, coal ports
- Founded: 1974
- Headquarters: Nakhodka Russia
- Key people: Anatoliy Lazarev (managing director)
- Revenue: $247 million (2017)
- Operating income: $161 million (2017)
- Net income: $124 million (2017)
- Total assets: $55 million (2017)
- Total equity: $347 million (2017)
- Number of employees: 1,700 people - 2016 year
- Parent: Port Management Company LLC
- Website: www.vostport.ru/en/

JSC "Vostochny Port" is the largest stevedoring company in Russia, specialising in coal transshipment using automated conveyor equipment. The level of automation of operations is 100%. The port's main cargo is coal mined in Kuzbass, Eastern Siberia and the Far East. More than 99% of cargo is exported, primarily to countries in the Asia-Pacific region which include mainly South Korea, Japan, and China. It is the largest coal terminal in Russia. In 2016, the company shipped 23.5 million tonnes of coal, which is about 30% of the Far East ports' cargo turnover and about 20% of the cargo turnover of all coal ports in Russia. The sole executive body of JSC "Vostochny Port" is "Managing Port Company", LLC.

The harbor, which remains ice-free even in the most severe winters, and reaches depths of 22 meters in the fairway, allows large-capacity, Capesize-type vessels of 180 thousand tonnes DWT to enter for loading. The port is remote from residential and industrial areas.

== History ==
In 1970 a decision was made to construct a seaport in the Wrangel Bay, near Nakhodka, to improve trade and economic relations and increase the turnover of goods between the Soviet Union and Japan. Construction began in December 1970. In 1971, the construction of the port was declared an All-Union Komsomol shock construction project.

On February 28, 1974, the USSR Merchant Marine Ministry issued decree No. 36 on the establishment of a new commercial seaport, "Vostochny Port". From this day on, the port in Wrangel Bay, having received an official certificate on its inception, was registered in all sailing directions and specified on navigation charts worldwide. That same year, its only pier started to operate. Construction of piers and technical facilities was carried out, along with housing development and construction of community service centers for employees who came from every part of the Soviet Union to participate in the Shock Construction Project. Eventually a new locality appeared on a map of Primorsky - the town Pervostroiteley (the town of Pioneers).

The construction of the coal complex became an important chapter in the history of "Vostochny Port". The construction was supervised on the All-Union level. Leading Soviet specialists were in charge of the project with Japanese engineers involved in development of engineering documentation. Active construction began in 1975. The normative period for construction of the giant complex was 36 months, but the builders, working around the clock, completed it six months ahead of schedule. The coal complex was put into operation on December 28, 1978, in the presence of regional and All-Union officials, "shock-builders" and locals. The cargo ship "Constantine Petrovsky" moored to the new pier and minutes later a mass of coal poured into her hold. The completed facility, with a capacity of 6.24 million tonnes, became the largest and most technically equipped coal-loading terminal in the Soviet Union.

Rail lines and dozens of conveyor lines to the piers were paved on its 40-hectare territory that stretches along the sea in taiga-covered hills. Huge machines (stackers – storing coal to dump, and reclaimers – transporting it from storage to ships) moved through these hills. The railcar load discharge facility, the weight station and the central transfer point started to function. A powerful six-hundred-foot pier on seven piles of sheet metal, which was an innovation in hydro engineering, stretched far into the bay. A new complex storage yard had a capacity of 1 million tonnes of coal, which corresponds to a mountain twelve meters high and several hundred meters long. A huge concrete bunker for a railcar dumper was 22 meters in depth, which is the height of an eight-story building. Coal loading equipment was imported from Japan.

By 1989, Vostochny port's cargo turnover had reached 12 million tonnes per year, ranking it among the largest ports of the Soviet Union. In 1992, the commercial seaport "Vostochny Port" became a joint-stock company.

The port's coal complex continued to expand in the nineties in New Russia. In 1996, the first facilities of phase 2 of the coal complex were put into operation. After it was put into operation and later modernized, the capacity of the coal complex has almost quadrupled.

The construction of phase 3 of the coal complex started in December 2012. For this purpose, all the necessary infrastructure of a modern high-tech coal port was constructed on 54 hectares of artificial territory.

== Stevedoring ==
In 2016, "Vostochny Port" made a record in yearly coal turnover among Russian ports, having handled 23.5 million tonnes of coal. The increase in annual cargo turnover was 779.5 thousand tonnes (3.4%). 324 thousand gondola cars, including 158 thousand innovative ones and 190 thousand heavy-haul gondola cars (over 70 tonnes) were unloaded in 2016. In November 2016, the transshipment complexes of JSC "Vostochny Port" reached a wintertime daily unloading record: 1,050 railcars were unloaded during the day, which is more than 70 thousand tonnes of coal.

In 2016, the port handled 526 ships, including 235 Panamax-type vessels (50-100 thousand tonnes DWT) and 23 Capesize-type vessels (100-180 thousand tonnes DWT).

The main export destinations are South Korea (41%), Japan (26%), China (11%), Malaysia (7%), Taiwan (5%), Vietnam (5%) and India (2%).

The cargo base of JSC "Vostochny Port", taking into account the port's increase in throughput capacity by 20 million tonnes, is ensured by contracts with major coal producers from various coal basins, including JSC Coal Company “Kuzbassrazrezugol”, JSC “SUEK”, PJSC Kuzzbasskaya Toplivnaya Company, JSC “Russian Coal”, JSC “Sibuglemet”, “Promugolservis” LLC, JSC “Belovskaya Mine”, “Razrez Stepanovsky” LLC, “Razrez Bungursky Severny ” LLC, “Razrez Arshanovsky” LLC, “Razrez Kiyzassky” LLC, and “Razrez "Vostochny” LLC.

During the 2nd Eastern Economic Forum held in Vladivostok in September 2016, an agreement was signed to handle 2 million tonnes of coal per year produced by the coal company Kolmar, starting in 2017 after the commissioning of phase 3 of the JSC "Vostochny Port" coal complex.

== Equipment ==
JSC "Vostochny Port" uses equipment from world's leading manufacturers. During the years of the port's modernization, stevedore reached 100% automation of operations. It is the only port in Primorsky Krai capable of handling Capesize-type vessels with a DWT of up to 180 thousand tonnes.

The port's high capacity and speed of cargo handling are achieved due to the use of specialized equipment at every stage of operation. Coal unloading is carried out at the railcar discharge station, equipped with 2 tandem railcar dumpers, railcar thawing equipment with capacity of 80 gondola cars, a windshield system with infrared heating, a drilling / ripping complex, conveyor equipment, and frozen coal crushing systems. Storing is performed by 4 reclaimers, 2 stackers, bulldozers and loaders. Coal loading onto the ships is performed by 4 ship loaders (each has a capacity of 3 thousand tonnes per hour) and other auxiliary machinery.

In 2016, a multi-phased magnetic coal system developed by the specialists of JSC "Vostochny Port" was installed. The system consists of 34 units of high-tech equipment, including 26 magnetic separators, 4 suspended magnets and 4 electromagnetic separators.

== Coal complex Phase 3 ==
A green light for investment projects in the port sector was given by the President of the Russian Federation, Vladimir Putin, in the summer of 2012. He ordered the construction of an additional export infrastructure in the Far East, including a free-access coal terminal with a capacity of not less than 20 million tonnes per year. In the autumn of 2012, "Managing Port Company" LLC (an executive body of JSC "Vostochny Port") decided to start a large-scale investment project for the construction of JSC "Vostochny Port" coal complex phase 3 with its own funds, without inducing a financial burden on federal and regional budgets. Phase 3 is an expansion of the existing coal transshipment complex of JSC "Vostochny Port", and is a fully automated terminal for coal transshipment from railway transport to sea vessels with the services of coal storage and processing.

The project involves the construction of 4 storage facilities with a total capacity of 780 thousand tonnes, as well as 2 piers and the installation of high-tech equipment at the complex. At the moment, more than 19 billion Rubles of the planned 27 billion have been invested, and a pier and an artificial land territory stretching far into the bay have been constructed. The port's phase 3 will be equipped with the most productive modern equipment, which is imported from Japan: two tandem railcar dumpers for heavy haul gondola cars, which allow for the unloading of four 70-tonne railcars with coal in only 3 minutes, two stackers, and four reclaimers with a capacity of 3,500 tonnes per hour.

In September 2016, the construction of pier No. 51 of JSC "Vostochny Port" was accomplished as part of the phase 3 project. During the 2nd Eastern Economic Forum, the port was visited by a delegation of the Ministry of Transport of the Russian Federation with Transport Minister Maksim Sokolov. The execution of the JSC "Vostochny Port" phase 3 investment project will ensure the timely and high-quality processing of permanently-growing coal cargo traffic that comes from the Baikal-Amur Mainline and Trans-Siberian Railway, and it will increase cargo turnover with countries in the Asia-Pacific region. At the "Transport of Russia 2016" exhibition, Prime Minister of the Russian Federation Dmitry Medvedev was informed of the execution of the phase 3 project. The government leader noted that it was a good time for the expansion of port capacities.

In December 2016, JSC "Vostochny Port" became a resident of The Free Port of Vladivostok. The volume of investment in the project under the contract with the Far East development corporation will reach 17.2 billion Rubles with the prospect of creating 619 jobs. The port's privileges, received due to its residency in The Free Port of Vladivostok, will allow it to direct additional funds for development of the company.

The increase in the capacity of JSC "Vostochny Port" requires the simultaneous development of railroad throughput. JSC "Russian Railways", "Managing Port Company", LLC and JSC "Vostochny Port" are jointly modernizing the public and non-public railways at Nakhodka-Vostochnaya railway station. The development program of JSC "Vostochny Port" includes the construction of a new non-public railway yard and large-scale development of a public railway station. The construction of the new station will allow the port to increase the volume of both railcars admitted with coal and dispatched emptied rolling stock. The railway infrastructure development is funded by "Managing Port Company", LLC and JSC "Vostochny Port". The volume of investment in the project is 5 billion Rubles. The federal infrastructure created for the development of the Nakhodka-Vostochnaya railway station will be provided to JSC "Russian Railways" free of charge. The throughput of the completed station will reach 39 million tonnes per year only for JSC "Vostochny Port" cargo, not including the cargo of other receivers that will also be able to use this new federal infrastructure. During the signing of the agreement between the rail monopoly and JSC "Vostochny Port", the President of JSC "Russian Railways", Oleg Belozerov, spoke favorably of the project's implementation.

During the 2nd Economic Forum, JSC "Russian Railways" and JSC "Vostochny Port" signed an agreement on the enhancement of coal transportation technology, prioritizing the use of innovative heavy haul railcars.

== Environmental Responsibility ==
JSC "Vostochny Port" maintains a responsible environmental policy. The company's structure includes an Ecology Department with its own certified labs monitoring the state of water and air on the territory of the company as well as outside its borders.

A powerful dust-collecting system works around the clock in the area of railcar dumpers at the coal complex of JSC "Vostochny Port". The port has 21 air purification units and 8 local wastewater treatment units that are constantly functioning to purify water to a level of quality acceptable for fisheries. The analysis of air and water samples in the bay indicates the preservation of required environmental indicators.

In 2016, JSC "Vostochny Port" spent more than 32 million Rubles to maintain environmental safety standards in its activities.

Kelp, trepangs, scallops and juvenile chum salmon are grown annually in specialized aqua culture facilities under contracts of JSC "Vostochny Port". All these sea animals are then released into the coastal waters of the Peter the Great Gulf, on the banks of which the port is located.

From 2012 to 2016 JSC "Vostochny Port" has spent 158 million Rubles on the execution of measures for environmental protection, 705 million Rubles on the modernization of equipment for environment protection and rational utilization of natural resources, and 105 million Rubles on the re-creation of marine bioresources. 150 million Rubles is the total volume of planned investment in 2017.

In December 2016, JSC "Vostochny Port" and the administration of Nakhodkinsky district had signed a long-term, five-year contract on cooperation in environmental protection. In June 2017, during the visit of the State Duma of the Russian Federation Deputy Victoria Nikolaeva, a five-year bilateral agreement on cooperation in environmental protection was signed. The document assumes an increase in joint environmental protection activities, information exchange, and execution of joint environment-oriented projects.

== Human resources and social policies ==
JSC "Vostochny Port" is part of the list of socially responsible organizations of the Russian Federation. Effective social policy management and partnership relations with employees are important factors of the company's long-term and sustainable development. With its own infrastructure, the company provides medical services, development of corporate sports, cultural activities and spa treatment for employees and their children.

Employees have a series of social benefits and financial privileges, social insurance, credit, and maternity benefits. Free training and qualification improvement is provided in the company's own education facility and at higher education institutions. According to a collective agreement, the port provides financial aid to its retired veterans.

In November 2016, "Managing Port Company" LLC and JSC "Vostochny Port" funded the organization of an oncological department in the city hospital of Nakhodka, Primorsky Krai. A complex of medical services for patients of the city and neighboring towns is concentrated in one location. The hospital's premises were renovated, and modern endoscopic equipment was purchased and installed. The new polyclinic department has its own reception, two consulting rooms for doctors, a minor surgery room, a staff room, a medical procedure room for cytostatic agent dilution, and a day-patient department with 5 beds, which will be maximally used in two shifts. The department will function as a regional oncological center to serve the residents of neighboring cities and districts.
