= Siege of Jama (1658) =

Russian siege of Jama

- Part of the Russo-Swedish War (1656–1658)
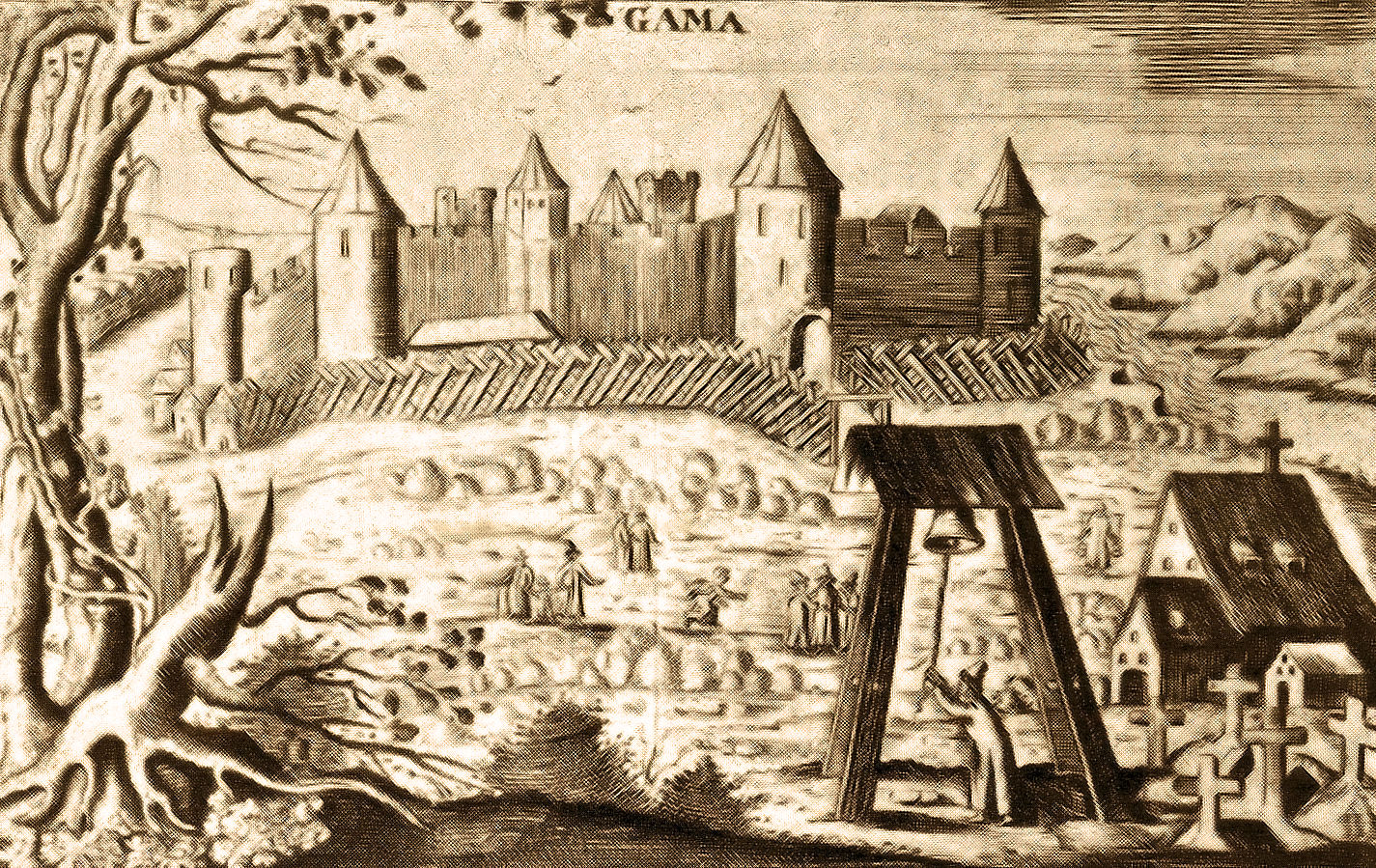
- Engraving of Jama from the 17th century
Date	21 January – March, 1658
Location	Jama (Yam fortress)
Result	Swedish victory
Territorial changes	Russian forces repulsed from Jama

Belligerents
(yes) Swedish Empire	Tsardom of Russia

Commanders and leaders
(Swedish Empire) Krister Horn	(Tsardom of Russia) Mikhail Shchetinin (Tsardom of Russia) Danila Nepluyuyev (Tsardom of Russia) Vasiliy Solntsev

Units involved
(Swedish Empire) Jama garrison (Swedish Empire) Relief force	Unknown

Strength
Garrison; A few dozen men Relief force 800 cavalry and infantry 4 guns	1,260–1,500 men 4 guns

Casualties and losses
14 killed	200 killed or 2 killed and 1 wounded

The siege of Jama occurred from January to March 1658, when a Russian force besieged the town, eventually being repulsed by a Swedish relief force led by Christer Horn consisting of 800 men and 4 cannons.

== Background ==
Following orders, Ivan Khovansky continued raiding operations in Ingria, but had no intentions of limiting himself to easier targets. At first, he decided to take Wask-Narva; however, when he arrived there, he found that it had been abandoned, and instead left a garrison of 500 men and went to Jama.

On 21 January 1657, three Russian forces converged on Jama. Khovansky dispatched Prince Mikhail Shchetinin with a force of 270 Don cossacks, 90 Pskov cossacks, and 200 new formation cavalry, being ordered to link up with another corps from Pskov led by Danila Neplyuyev, who was apparently already at Jama.

Prince Grigoriy Kurakin, the commander of the Novgorod Army, sent Prince Vasiliy Solntsev from Novgorod with a corps of old-style cavalry, 300 Moscow streltsy, and 400 troops to Jama as well.

== Siege ==
Upon their arrival, the three forces, which had also brought with them four cannons, immediately besieged Jama. The Swedish garrison in total only consisted of a Lieutenant and a handful of soldiers. In early February, Solntsev successfully stormed Jama, forcing the defenders to withdraw into the castle keep, which was the only part of the town remaining in their control.

The Russians began bombarding the defenders with the four artillery pieces they had brought. Already after a few days, the Russian force divided itself; some remained at Jama, and another one went to Kattila, four miles from Jama.

Despite their situation, the garrison managed to hold the castle for a month. The Russians had earlier received orders to avoid wasting time on sieges, so several Russian units were dispatched to continue raiding while the others stayed at Jama. These operations consequently meant that the Russians controlled most of western Ingria, and Sweden only held Narva, Ivangorod, Koporye, and Jama. At the end of January, a part of the Russian force at Jama had withdrawn, and some 1,500 men remained according to Swedish estimates.

In early March, Christer Horn got reports that the Swedes at Jama still held the keep, but were facing a shortage of gunpowder, he most likely also learnt that the Swedes had repulsed Russian storming attempts of the keep six times, and that the defenders had begun negotiations for their surrender. As a result, Horn quickly issued orders for the dispatch of a relief force. Since he was aware that Russian agents regularly received information from Narva, he ordered the city gates to remain closed while preparations went on.

=== Relief ===
In the evening, as soon as the Swedish preparations were finished, Christer Horn marched of Narva with a force of 800 cavalry and infantry, along with four cannons. Marching through the night, the Swedish relief force launched a surprise attack on the besieging Russians early in the morning, forcing the Russians to disperse, thus abandoning the siege. Horn also captured 300 horses and freed some civilian captives. The Russians lost 200 men, while Horn only lost some 14 dragoons.

The commander at Jama had planned on surrendering on the very same day, only at noon. Either Horn's timing had been lucky, or he had been kept informed about the negotiations and thus planned the relief expedition on the day of the planned surrender and when the Russians were confident in their success, and less likely to be vigilant.

== Aftermath ==
Before Horn departed for Narva, he brought in additional gunpowder and reinforced the garrison with 40 soldiers and two artillerymen. Following the successful relief expedition, Russia withdrew most of the raiders from Jama in early March, along with executing all of their prisoners.

== Works cited ==
- Gyadzatsky, Sergei (1945). Борьба русских людей Ижорской земли в XVII веке против иностранного владычества [The struggle of the Russian people of Izhora land in the XVII century against foreign rule] (in Russian). Исторические записки.
- Fagerlund, Rainer (1979). Stade, Arne (ed.). Kriget på östfronten [The War on the Eastern Front] (in Swedish). Militärhistoriska förlaget. ISBN 9789185266098.
- Essen, Michael Fredholm von (2023). Charles X's Wars: Volume 3 - The Danish Wars, 1657-1660. Helion & Company. ISBN 9781915113603.
- Ignatius, Karl Emil Ferdinand (1865). Finlands historia under Karl X Gustafs regering [History of Finland during the reign of Karl X Gustaf] (in Swedish). Edlund.
- Кирпичников, А. Н. (1984). Отв. ред. П. А. Раппопорт Каменные крепости Новгородской земли [Stone fortresses of Novgorod land] (in Russian). Л.: Наука, Ленинградское отделение.
- Коллектив авторов. (2012). Крепость Ям [Yam fortress]. Крепости Северо-Запада России: от крепости к крепости (in Russian). Каламос.
