= Mirabella Karyanova =

Russian electronic musician

Mirabella Karyanova (born 1990), also known as Ishome and Shadowax, is a Russian electronic musician, DJ, and producer.

== Career ==
Originally from Nakhodka, Russia, Mirabella Karyanova began creating electronic music at 14, after her family relocated to Krasnodar.

She used FL Studio and Dance Ejay to create early demos, and shared music to the Russian social media platform VKontakte where she befriended Zhenya Vega, owner of the record label Fuselab.

In 2013, Fuselab released Ishome's debut album Confession. It was awarded 8th place in Afisha magazine's 25 Best Russian Albums of the Year. Sputnikmusic described it as "short wave of drowsy, contemporary electronic music", and awarded it 4.5/5.

Alongside Ishome, Karyanova also released under the alias Shadowax, which she described as "more techno centric" than Ishome. In 2019, she released Nikolai Reptile, an EP on the label Trip managed by Nina Kravitz. In their review of the EP, Pitchfork wrote, "it only enhances the producer’s burgeoning reputation as a mastermind of beautifully erratic moves". They awarded it 7.8/10.

== Discography ==
=== Ishome ===
==== Albums ====
- 2013 - Confession
- 2025 - carpet watcher

==== EP/Singles ====
- 2010 - Caraboo
- 2010 - Al Capone
- 2011 - Eva
- 2014 - Ken Tavr
- 2014 - Exit

=== Shadowax ===
==== EP/Singles ====
- 2018 - A&B
- 2019 - Nikolai Reptile

== Awards ==
Year	Awards	Category	Result
2016	Sergei Kuryokhin Awards	Электро-Механика (Electro-mechanics)	Nominated
2019	Jager Music Awards	Электроника (Best electronic music artist)	Won
