= Nakhodka =

City in Primorsky Krai, Russia

Nakhodka Находка
- City
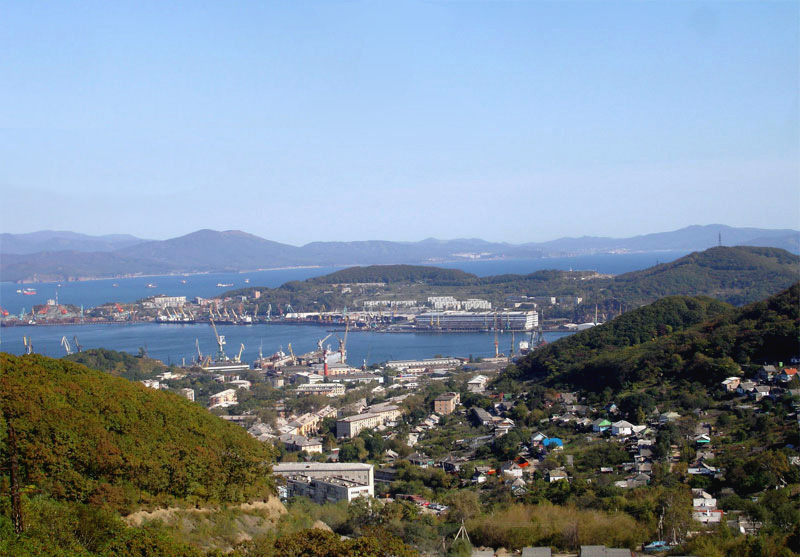
- View of Nakhodka

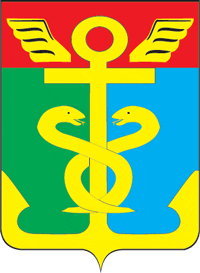
- Flag Coat of arms
- Interactive map of Nakhodka
- Location of Nakhodka Nakhodka (Primorsky Krai)
- Coordinates: 42°49′N 132°52′E
- Country: Russia
- Federal subject: Primorsky Krai
- Founded: 1864
- City status since: May 18, 1950

Government
  - Head: Oleg Kolyadin

Area
  - Total: 325.9 km^{2} (125.8 sq mi)
- Elevation: 8 m (26 ft)

Population (2010 Census)
  - Total: 159,719
  - Estimate (2025): 133,859 (−16.2%)
  - Rank: 110th in 2010
  - Density: 490.1/km^{2} (1,269/sq mi)

Administrative status
  - Subordinated to: Nakhodka City Under Krai Jurisdiction
  - Capital of: Nakhodka City Under Krai Jurisdiction

Municipal status
  - Urban okrug: Nakhodkinsky Urban Okrug
  - Capital of: Nakhodkinsky Urban Okrug
- Time zone: UTC+10 (MSK+7)
- Postal codes: 690890, 692900–692906, 692909–692911, 692913, 692914, 692916–692924, 692926, 692928–692930, 692939–692941, 692943, 692952–692954, 692956
- Dialing code: +7 4236
- OKTMO ID: 05714000001
- City Day: Last Sunday in May
- Website: www.nakhodka-city.ru

Nakhodka (Russian: Нахо́дка, IPA: [nɐˈxotkə], means "finding") is a port city in Primorsky Krai, Russia, located on the Trudny Peninsula jutting into the Nakhodka Bay of the Sea of Japan, about 85 kilometers (53 mi) east of Vladivostok (169 kilometers by car ), the administrative center of the krai. Population: 159,719 (2010 census); 148,826 (2002 census); 160,056 (1989 Soviet census).

Historical population
Year	Pop.	±%
1959	63,725	—
1970	103,659	+62.7%
1979	133,201	+28.5%
1989	160,056	+20.2%
2002	148,826	−7.0%
2010	159,719	+7.3%
2021	139,931	−12.4%
Source: Censuses

== History ==
The Nakhodka Bay, around which the city is organized, was first known to the Russians on the corvette Amerika, which sought shelter in the bay during a storm in 1859. In honor of this occasion, the ice-free and relatively calm bay was named Nakhodka, which in Russian means "discovery" or "lucky find".

An imperial settlement existed here from 1868 to 1872 but was abandoned following the death of its administrator, Harald Furuhjelm. In the fall of 1870, Otto Wilhelm Lindholm established a whaling station across the bay from the settlement. In the spring of 1871 he fitted out his schooner Hannah Rice and sailed to Posyet, where he caught six gray whales.

Until the 20th century, the area around the bay remained uninhabited. When the Soviet government decided to build a harbor in the area in the 1930s, a number of small settlements were founded, which were merged as a work settlement in the 1940s. On May 18, 1950, the settlement, by then with a population of about 28,000 residents, was granted town status.

== Administrative and municipal status ==
Within the framework of administrative divisions, it is, together with three rural localities, incorporated as Nakhodka City Under Krai Jurisdiction—an administrative unit with the status equal to that of the districts. As a municipal division, Nakhodka City Under Krai Jurisdiction is incorporated as Nakhodkinsky Urban Okrug.

== Geography ==
=== Climate ===
Nakhodka has one of the mildest climates in Primorsky Krai and in the whole of the Asian part of Russia. Average temperature in January is −9.3 °C (15.3 °F); in August (the warmest month), it is +20.6 °C (69.1 °F). It is classified as a humid continental climate (Köppen climate classification Dfb, Trewartha climate classification Dcbo) due to the vast seasonal differences and is a very cold climate for a coastal location below 43 degrees latitude. The maritime influence is manifested in low diurnal temperature variation and a vast summer seasonal lag. Due to the influence of the interior, there is a sharp drop in temperatures between October and November. Half of the year has mean temperatures above 10 °C (50 °F), in spite of the warmest month being only moderately warm and the coldest month having quite severe cold, with a very low seasonal lag in winter.

Climate data for Nakhodka
Month	Jan	Feb	Mar	Apr	May	Jun	Jul	Aug	Sep	Oct	Nov	Dec	Year
Record high °C (°F)	9 (48)	7 (45)	16 (61)	30 (86)	29 (84)	30 (86)	37 (99)	34 (93)	27 (81)	23 (73)	22 (72)	10 (50)	37 (99)
Mean daily maximum °C (°F)	−6.2 (20.8)	−3 (27)	2.7 (36.9)	9.4 (48.9)	14.5 (58.1)	18.8 (65.8)	22.2 (72.0)	23.6 (74.5)	20 (68)	13.5 (56.3)	4.8 (40.6)	−2.8 (27.0)	9.9 (49.8)
Daily mean °C (°F)	−9.3 (15.3)	−5.9 (21.4)	−0.1 (31.8)	6.1 (43.0)	11 (52)	15.3 (59.5)	19 (66)	20.6 (69.1)	17 (63)	10.5 (50.9)	1.8 (35.2)	−6 (21)	6.9 (44.4)
Mean daily minimum °C (°F)	−12.2 (10.0)	−8.8 (16.2)	−3 (27)	2.8 (37.0)	7.8 (46.0)	12.3 (54.1)	16.2 (61.2)	17.9 (64.2)	14.2 (57.6)	7.7 (45.9)	−0.8 (30.6)	−8.7 (16.3)	3.9 (39.0)
Record low °C (°F)	−27 (−17)	−22 (−8)	−15 (5)	−7 (19)	1 (34)	3 (37)	6 (43)	11 (52)	2 (36)	−7 (19)	−18 (0)	−22 (−8)	−27 (−17)
Average precipitation mm (inches)	38 (1.5)	32 (1.3)	37 (1.5)	44 (1.7)	71 (2.8)	102 (4.0)	141 (5.6)	141 (5.6)	105 (4.1)	58 (2.3)	51 (2.0)	40 (1.6)	860 (33.9)
Average precipitation days	5	7	9	10	9	14	13	12	10	8	9	6	112
Average rainy days	0	1	2	9	9	14	13	12	10	8	6	2	86
Average snowy days	5	6	7	2	0	0	0	0	0	1	3	5	29
Source 1: Primorsky-Meteo
Source 2: Weatherbase

== Economy and infrastructure ==
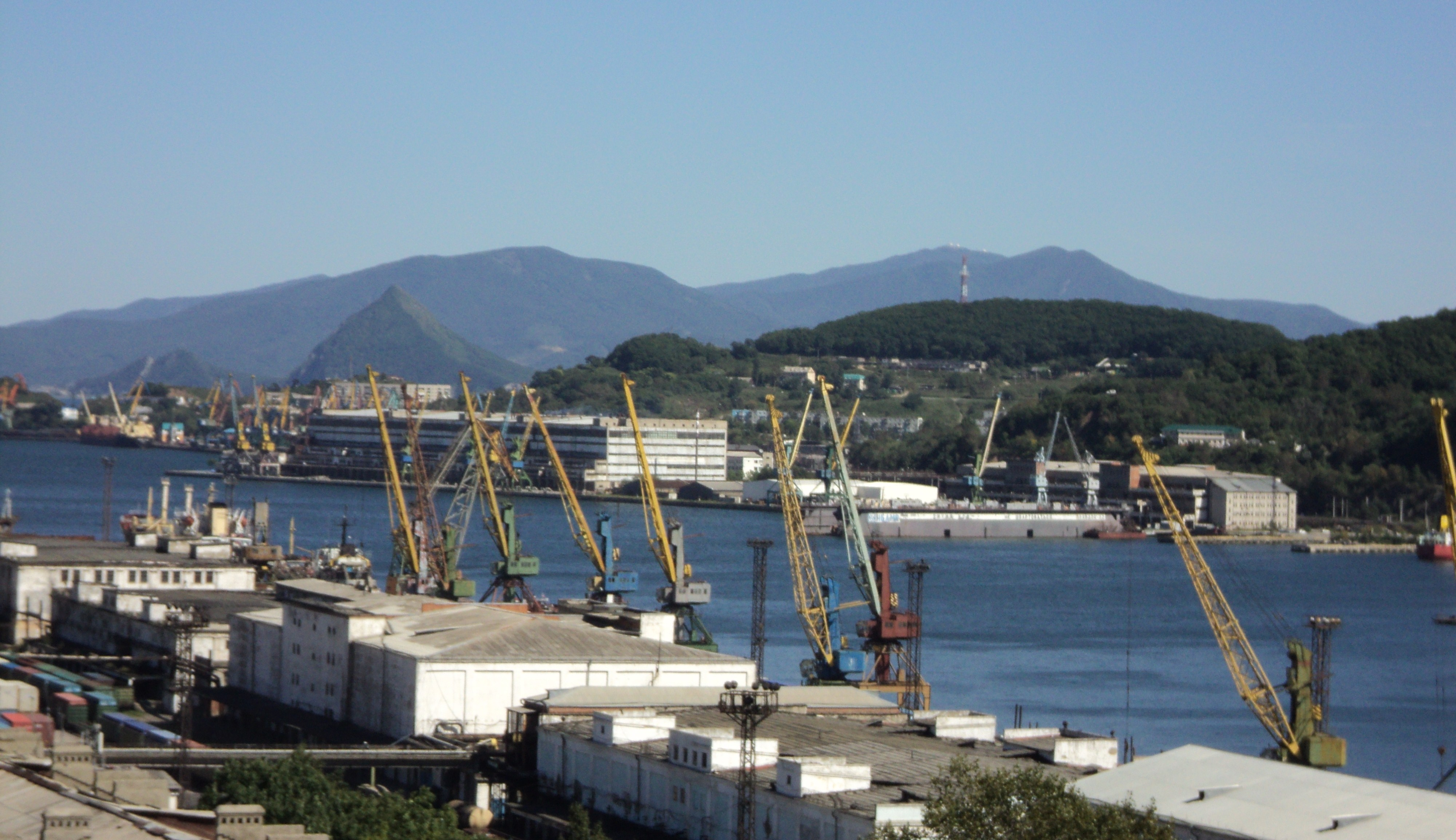
Nakhodka Port, September 2010

The city's economy, based mostly around a port and port-related activity such as fish processing and canning, had suffered since 1991 as Vladivostok was opened to foreign activity again. Local industry also took a hit during the 1998 Russian financial crisis.

Map of railway stations in Nakhodka (2025)

Nakhodka is a transport junction where goods from Japan are transferred from ships in the Port of Vostochny onto the Russian railway system, including the Trans-Siberian Railway portion of the Eurasian Land Bridge. JSC Vostochny Port, a stevedoring company, is headquartered in the city.

The Port of Kozmino has been since 2012 the eastern terminus of the Eastern Siberia-Pacific Ocean pipeline.

== Sports ==
FC Okean Nakhodka was the only professional sport club in the city. It spent the 1992 and 1993 seasons in the Russian Premier League, although the club later folded and was refounded in the amateur leagues. It is also the home town of association football player Viktor Fayzulin.

== Twin towns and sister cities ==
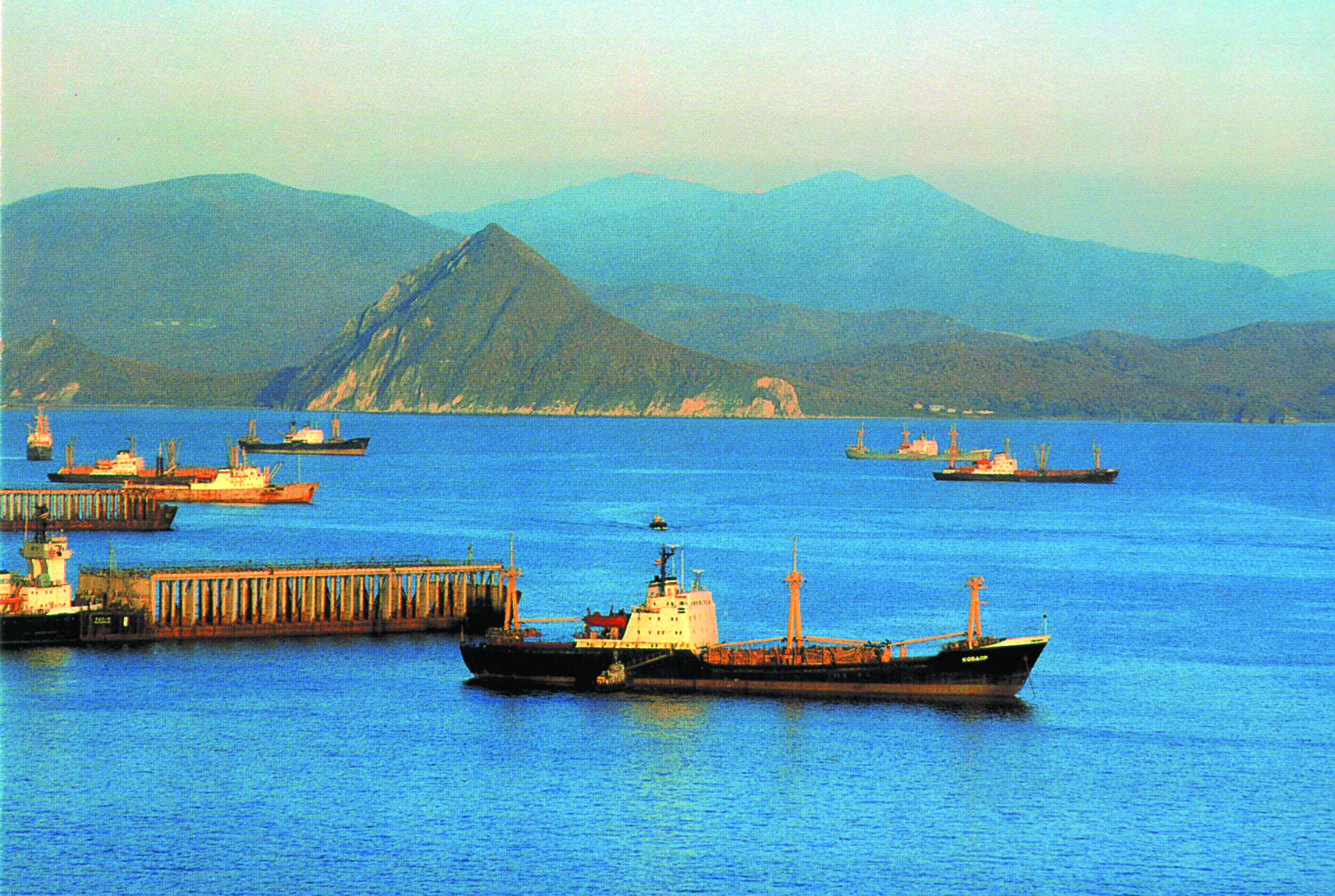
Roadstead at the Port of Nakhodka

Nakhodka has the following sister city relationships:

City	State/province	Country	Date
Maizuru	Kyoto	Japan	June 1961^{1}
Otaru	Hokkaido	Japan	September 12, 1966
Bellingham	Washington	United States	April 1975
Oakland	California	United States	April 1975
Tsuruga	Fukui	Japan	October 1982
Jilin	(China) Jilin	China	July 1991
Donghae	Gangwon	South Korea	December 1991
Clare	Michigan	United States	October 1997
Phuket	Phuket Province	Thailand	September 21, 2006

^1First Soviet Union-Japan sister city

== Notable people ==
- Mirabella Karyanova (born 1990), Russian electronic musician, DJ, and producer
