= Eastern Siberia–Pacific Ocean oil pipeline =

Oil pipeline

Location
- Country: Russia
- Direction: West–East
- Start: Taishet
- Passes through: Kazachinskoye; Skovorodino
- To: Kozmino; Daqing (China)
- Runs alongside: Yakutia–Khabarovsk–Vladivostok gas pipeline

General information
- Type: Oil pipeline
- Operator: Transneft
- Commissioned: 2009 (Phase 1); 2012 (Phase 2)

Technical information
- Length: 4,857 km (3,018 mi)
- Maximum discharge: 1,600,000 barrels per day (~8.0×10^{7} t/a)

The Eastern Siberia–Pacific Ocean oil pipeline (ESPO pipeline or ESPOOP, Russian: Нефтепровод "Восточная Сибирь - Тихий океан" (ВСТО)) is a pipeline system for exporting Russian crude oil to the Asia-Pacific markets (Japan, China and Korea). The pipeline is built and operated by Russian pipeline company Transneft.

== History ==
The first discussions of launching the ESPO pipeline started in the 1970s. Later, in 1996, on the initiative of the Russian president, Boris Yeltsin, Russia and China signed an energy agreement including plans for the ESPO pipeline. The original project of this pipeline was proposed by the Russian oil company Yukos in 2001 as an independent oil pipeline. The project involved the building of a pipeline from Angarsk, where Yukos operated a refinery, to Daqing in northern China. At the same time, Transneft proposed an alternative project to pipe oil from Taishet in Irkutsk Oblast to the Far East port Kozmino near Nakhodka. In May 2003, the Russian Government decided to combine these projects and that Transneft would be in charge of the pipeline, while Yukos would supply the oil. On 29 May 2003, Russia and China signed an agreement on construction of the pipeline. On 31 December 2004, the Russian government approved the construction of the pipeline from Taishet in East Siberia to Perevoznaya, Primorsky Krai, in the Pacific region.

Construction of the pipeline started in April 2006. On 4 October 2008, the section between Taishet and Talakan was launched in a reverse to pump oil from Surgutneftegas-owned Alinsky deposit. The first stage of the pipeline was completely laid in May 2009 and the whole first stage was reversed in December 2009. The terminal at Kozmino was inaugurated by Russian prime minister Vladimir Putin on 28 December 2009.

Construction of the second stage from Skovorodino to the Pacific Ocean started after launch of the first stage. In meantime, oil was transported from Skovorodino to Kozmino by railway. The second stage was inaugurated on 25 December 2012.

=== China branch ===
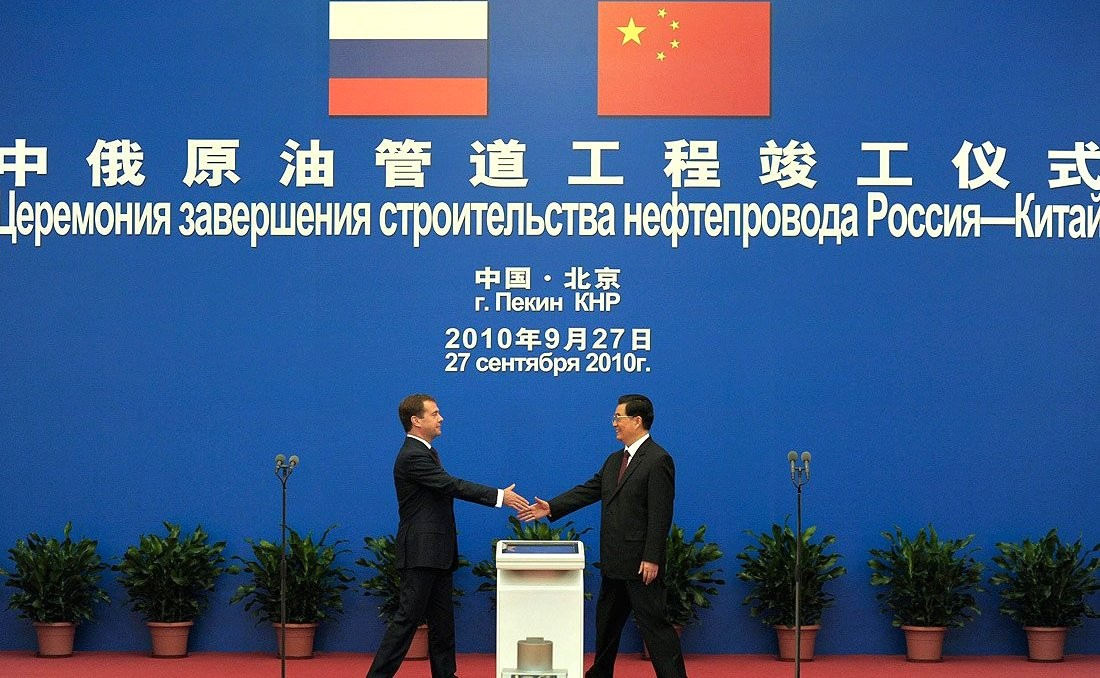
Dmitry Medvedev and Hu Jintao

In June 2009, Russia and China signed a deal to build the spur pipeline to China by which Russia supplies China with 15 million tonnes of oil (300,000 barrels per day (48,000 m^{3}/d)) each year for 20 years in exchange for a loan worth US$25 billion to Russian companies Transneft and Rosneft for pipeline and oil fields development. Construction of the spur to China started in the Russian territory on 27 April 2008 and in Chinese territory on 18 May 2009. The 64 kilometres (40 mi) long section from Skovorodino to the Amur River on Russia-China border was built by Transneft and the 992 kilometres (616 mi) long section from Russia-China border to Daqing was built by the China National Petroleum Corporation (CNPC). It was completed in September 2010. On 1 January 2011, Russia said it had begun scheduled oil shipments to China.

== Route ==
The 4,857-kilometre (3,018 mi) pipeline is being laid by the route of Taishet-Kazachinskoye-Skovorodino-Kozmino. Because of protests of environmental organizations, the initial pipeline route was moved 40 kilometres (25 mi) north of Lake Baikal. Instead of going through Buryatia, it was built through Sakha Republic. The 2,757-kilometre (1,713 mi) long first stage runs from Taishet to Skovorodino and the 2,100-kilometre (1,300 mi) long second stage will run from Skovorodino to Kozmino. From Skovorodino the branch pipeline would extend through Mohe to Daqing, China. The 64 kilometres (40 mi) long section runs from Skovorodino to the Amur River on Russia-China border and the 992 kilometres (616 mi) long section runs from Russia-China border to Daqing.

There is a plan to lay a parallel Yakutia–Khabarovsk–Vladivostok gas pipeline alongside the oil pipeline.

== Technical features ==
The initial capacity of the 122-centimetre (48 in) pipeline is 600,000 barrels per day (~3.0×10^{7} t/a). By 2016 the capacity of the pipeline will be increased up to 1,000,000 barrels per day (~5.0×10^{7} t/a) and by 2025 up to 1,600,000 barrels per day (~8.0×10^{7} t/a). The capacity of the link to China is 600,000 barrels per day (~3.0×10^{7} t/a) and its section in the Russian territory cost US$600 million.

The pipeline consist of 32 pumping stations, including 13 with tank farms with a total capacity of 2.67 million cubic metres (94×10^{6} cu ft). For feeding pumping stations with electricity, a 35 MW power station was built near the town of Olyokminsk in the Sakha Republic. It is fired by the crude oil from the ESPO pipeline. The power station is designed for independent operation in demanding Arctic temperature conditions. The terminal at Kozmino has a tank farm with a capacity of 350,000 cubic metres (12,000,000 cu ft). The loading capacity of the terminal is 300,000 barrels per day (~1.5×10^{7} t/a).

The first stage was built by Systema SpecStroy, Krasnodarstroytransgaz, Vostok Story, Promstroy, Amerco Int. and IP Set Spb. [sic] Five 16V32 crude oil-fired engines for the pipeline-related power station were delivered in summer 2008 by Wärtsilä. The first stage of the pipeline cost US$12.27 billion and the export terminal cost $1.74 billion.

== Resource base ==
The pipeline is supplied from the oil fields of Tomsk Oblast and the Khanty–Mansi Autonomous Okrug in Western Siberia along the existing Omsk–Irkutsk pipeline that joins the ESPO pipeline in Taishet, as well as oil provinces of Eastern Siberia. At the initial stage 22 million tons of oil is supplied by Rosneft and 8 million tons by Surgutneftegas.

== Controversies ==
=== Embezzlement allegations ===
In November 2010, one of the minor shareholders of Transneft, Alexei Navalny, accused the company management of engaging in a US$4 billion embezzlement during the construction of the pipeline. These accusations were denied by Nikolay Tokarev, head of Transneft.

=== Dispute with CNPC ===
In 2011, a dispute rose over payments for oil delivery through the pipeline. While Transneft has charged CNPC with violating their supply contract, CNPC is not acknowledging these claims. The contract stipulate the monthly volumes of oil according to the agreed price formula, which is less than the spot price of oil.

== See also ==
- Kazakhstan-China oil pipeline
- Subfluvial tunnel ESPO and Lena River
- Petroleum industry in Russia
