= Yam fortress =

Medieval fortress in Kingisepp, Russia

Yam
- Ям (Russian)
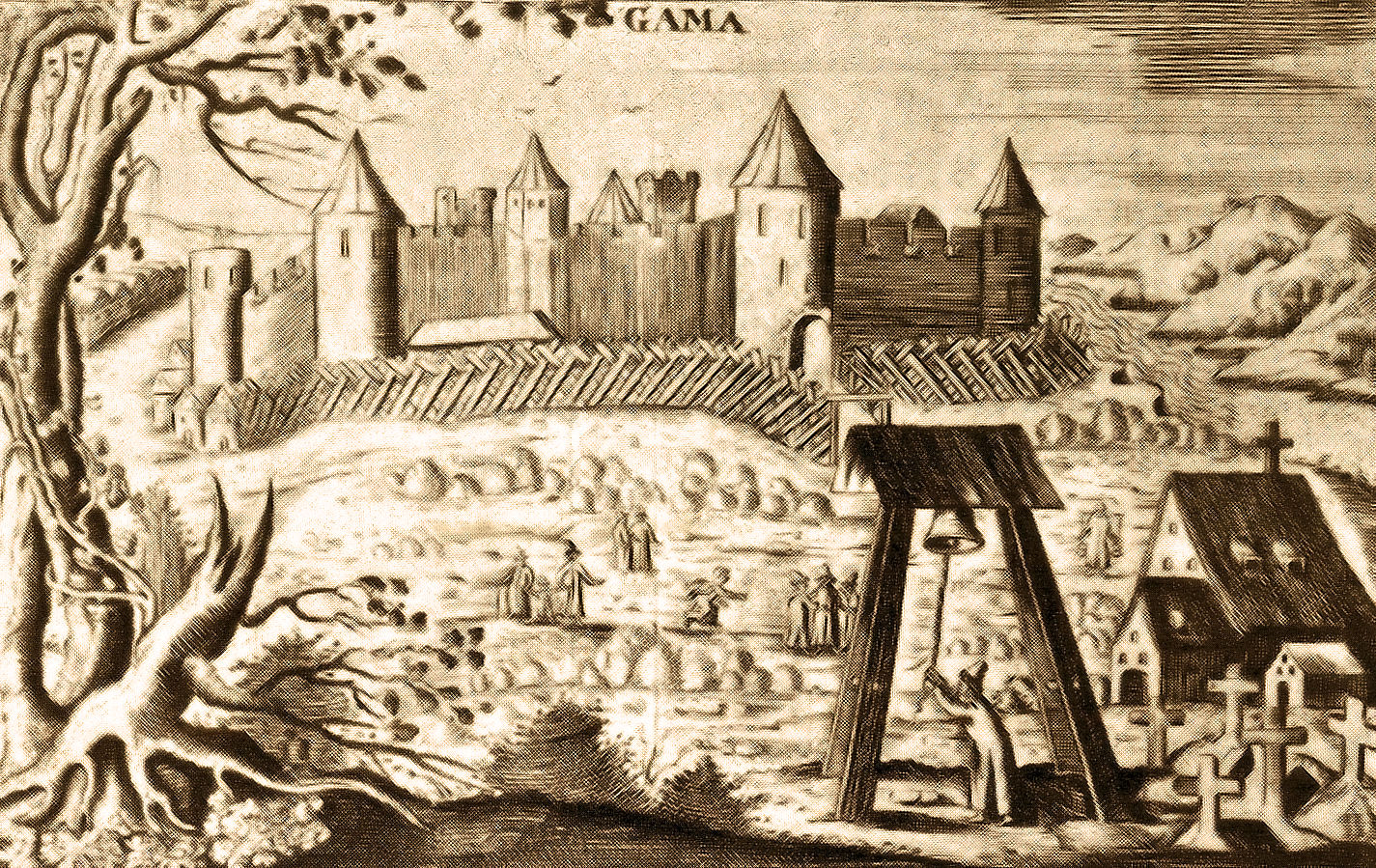
- A drawing of Yam fortress, engraved at the beginning of the 17th century
- Interactive map of Yam
- 59°22′34.460″N 28°35′38.944″E
- Type: Fortress
- Location: Kingisepp, Leningrad Oblast, Russia

History
- Founded: 1384
- Founder: Ivan Fyodorovich
- Demolished: 1781

Site notes
- Current use: park

Yam (also Yama or Yamgorod; Russian: Ям) is a fortress and heritage site located on the eastern bank of the Luga river in Kingisepp, Leningrad Oblast, Russia.

The fortress was built in 1384 by Ivan Fyodorovich, a boyar (noble) of the Novgorod republic, to protect the republic's western borders. Thanks to it, Yam remained unconquered from the 14th to 15th centuries. The fortress was completely rebuilt after the Novgorod Republic was incorporated into the Grand Principality of Moscow. Following the construction of Ivangorod Fortress, Yam fortress lost its military significance.

Between the end of the 16th century and the beginning of the 17th century, Yam fortress was captured twice by the Swedish army, and the fortress was awarded to Sweden in 1612 by the Treaty of Stolbovo. Russians stormed the fortress in 1658 and captured most of it, however the Swedish garrison held out in the Detinets. Subsequently, the Swedish army demolished most of the fortress (except for the Detinets) to re-build it. Construction of a new bastion-type fortress was begun but never finished. In 1703 the fortress was recaptured by the Russians. The construction of Yam was completed by the Russian tsar Peter the Great. However, since the border of Russia extended further westward, Yam fell into disuse. The remains of the Detinets were demolished on the orders of Catherine the Great in 1781, and the bastions were abandoned. In the 19th century, the area surrounding the fortress became a town park.

== History ==
=== Novgorod Republic ===
According to Russian chronicles, Yam fortress was founded in 1384 at the supposed location of the Luga river crossing. It was built in 33 days, and its construction seems to have been very important to Novgorod. A chronicler says that, "all the nobles of Novgorod" took part in the process. Five kochansky voivods (heads of districts) led the construction. Ivan Fyodorovich was in charge and assisted by Osip Zakharovich, Yury Ontsiforovich, Fyodor Timofeev, Stepan Borisov and other "boyars and philistines". The fortress was built on the right (eastern) bank of the Luga river crossing that was also the intersection of land and waterway routes from Novgorod to Europe. In addition, Yam was connected with Koporye by road allowing the ability to move reserve troops. At the same time, some Novgorod citizens were moved to settle the fortress on preferential terms and Russian peasants settled in its surrounding areas. Later, the settlement around Yam was established as a town named Yamgorod ('Yam-town').

In 1395, the Swedes unsuccessfully assaulted Yam. A garrison led by Prince Konstantin defeated the Swedish army, which then fled. Two years later, it was assaulted again, this time by Livonian knights. They plundered several villages around Yam, but did not attempt to storm the fortress.

During the Novgorodian–Livonian war, the Livonian army attacked Yam in 1443; they burned out the posad (settlement) and destroyed the pier. Despite the fact that ambassadors of the Livonian Order tried to present this attack as an independent raid by an uncontrolled warlord, in the fall of 1444, a large, well-armed Livonian army lay siege to the fortress. The army's weapons included a Prussian bombard (cannon). The prince of Suzdal, Vasily Yuryevich, who was serving at Novgorod at the time, led Yam's defenders. As a result of a cannon duel, the Livonian army's bombard was destroyed. Its forces retreated, suffering heavy losses. In 1447, the Livonian Order tried to capture Yam again with a much larger army. It had its own army from Narva, but also had several squads, artillery, weapons and a wagon train from Prussia. The battle was intense and according to Livonian sources lasted 13 days. On the last day, reinforcements arrived from Novgorod carrying artillery, forcing the Livonian army to retreat with heavy losses again. The Livonians plundered many villages around Yam and even on the banks of the Neva and Izhora rivers.

A peace treaty was signed in 1448, but as the result of the war, Yam was heavily damaged. It had become outdated and could no longer protect the town from the latest cannons. As a result, by the order of Novgorod's archbishop Euthymius II, who inspected Yam at that time, the old fortress was disassembled in 1449. A new modern fortress was built immediately at the same location.

=== Grand Principality of Moscow ===
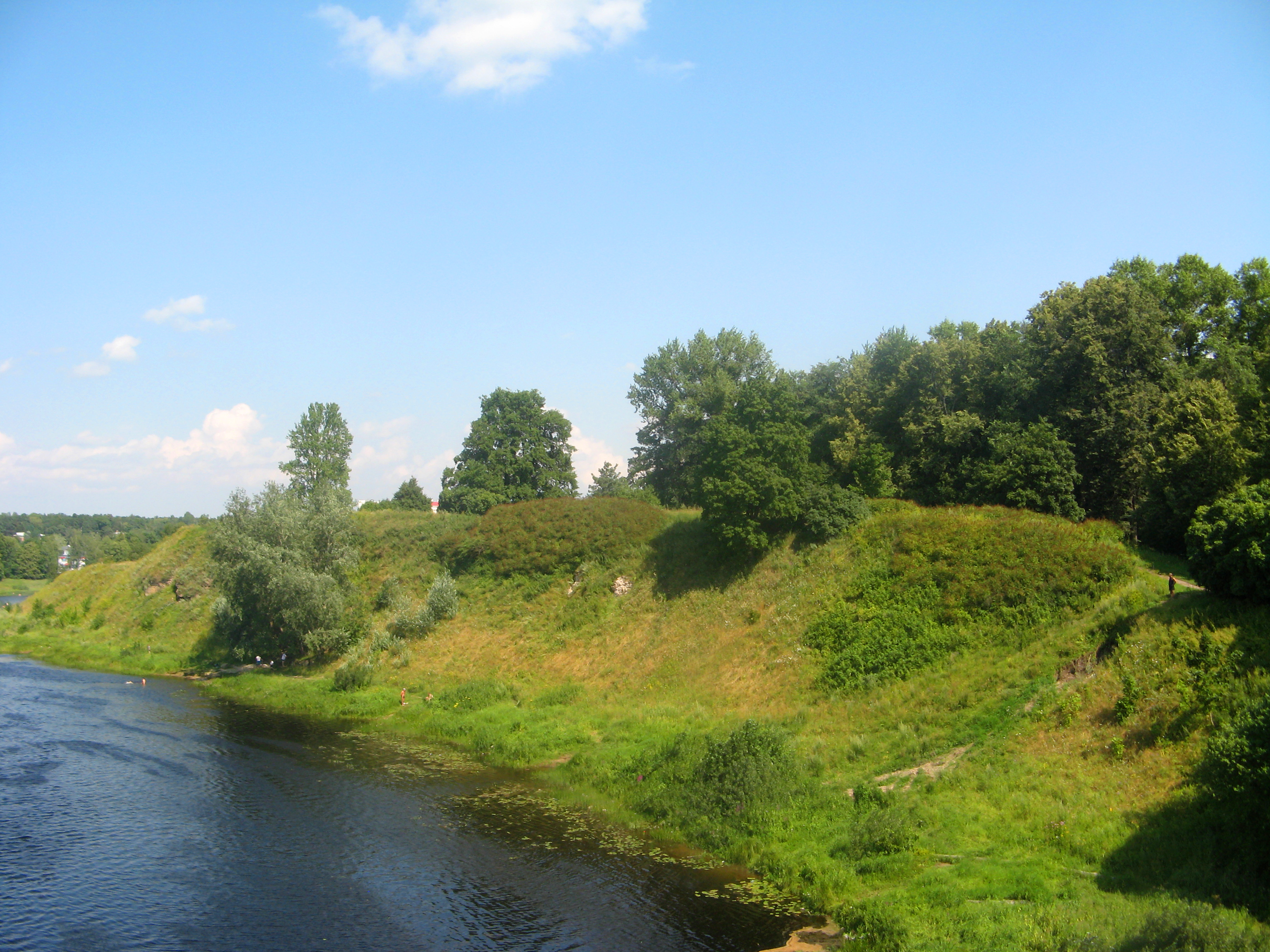
Fortress wall remains, viewed from the Luga river

When the Novgorod republic was incorporated into the Grand Principality of Moscow in 1478, the Yam fortress remained on its border, so it was repaired and a wooden fortification was built in Yamgorod settlement. In 1492, Ivan III ordered the construction of a new fortress not far from Yam on the road to Livonia, just across the river from the Narva fortress. In 1490, Yam was modernized along with the other fortifications of northwestern Russia. Yamgorod then became the main trade center on the Luga river banks and the surrounding area. It was surrounded by 67 villages with 393 households, according to Dmitry Kitayev's book written in 1500 about the Vodskaya pyatina.

=== Kingdom of Sweden ===
In 1580, when Russia was busy fighting in the Livonian War, John III of Sweden decided to capture the Russian Baltic coastline. He sent an army led by Pontus De la Gardie to capture all the fortresses in that region up to Novgorod. Koporye, Korela, Ivangorod and Narva were defeated before Yam was captured at September 28, 1581. Swedish forces held Yam until 1590, when Russia recaptured it after a three-day siege. On May 25, 1595, a peace treaty signed in the village of Tyavzino saw Yam remain as part of Russia.

During the Time of Troubles in 1612, Sweden captured Yam again, and in 1617, a new treaty signed in Stolbovo village secured these lands for Sweden. In 1633, a Holstein ambassador passed through Yamburg (the Swedish name for the village) and described it as a medium-size fortress with eight towers and high stone walls.

During the Russo-Swedish War in 1658, Russian forces stormed Yam and entered the fortress, but the Swedes hid in the detinets and repelled all attacks. The Russians' attempt to capture the fortress failed because of a lack of artillery. They had to retreat from the mostly captured fortress. In 1681, Erik Dahlbergh surveyed the fortress. He found it in terrible condition, but remarked on the high quality of its construction. He pointed that neither Yam nor Koporye was ever repaired after their capture by Sweden, so it would be cheaper to demolish both fortresses to prevent their use by an enemy. In 1682, most of the Yam fortress, except for the detinets, was blown up with 40 barrels of gunpowder. A new bastion fortress was founded in the same place, but it had not been finished before the beginning of the Great Northern War in 1700.

=== Russian Empire ===
In 1700, Yamburg surrendered to the forces of Peter I without a fight, but their defeat at Narva forced the Russians to leave the fortress. On May 13, 1703, a Russian squad under the command of Major General Nikolay Verden came to Yamburg and began to shell it with cannons. The following day, the garrison sent a drummer to ask for an honorable surrender, and it was accepted. The Russians also let the garrison move to Narva and did not harm those who decided to remain. The now-Swedish form of the town name—Yamburg—was kept after the capture. The bastion fortress was not finished until the fall of the same year following the decree of the Russian tsar and under the command of Field Marshall Boris Sheremetev. It was not rebuilt using stone because after the capture of Narva and Derpt the border moved far to the west and the only use for Yam was to hold a small garrison in case of a Swedish amphibious assault. The detinets was saved during rebuilding and became part of the new fortress. At that time, the fortress was manned a garrison with 53 cannons of different calibers.

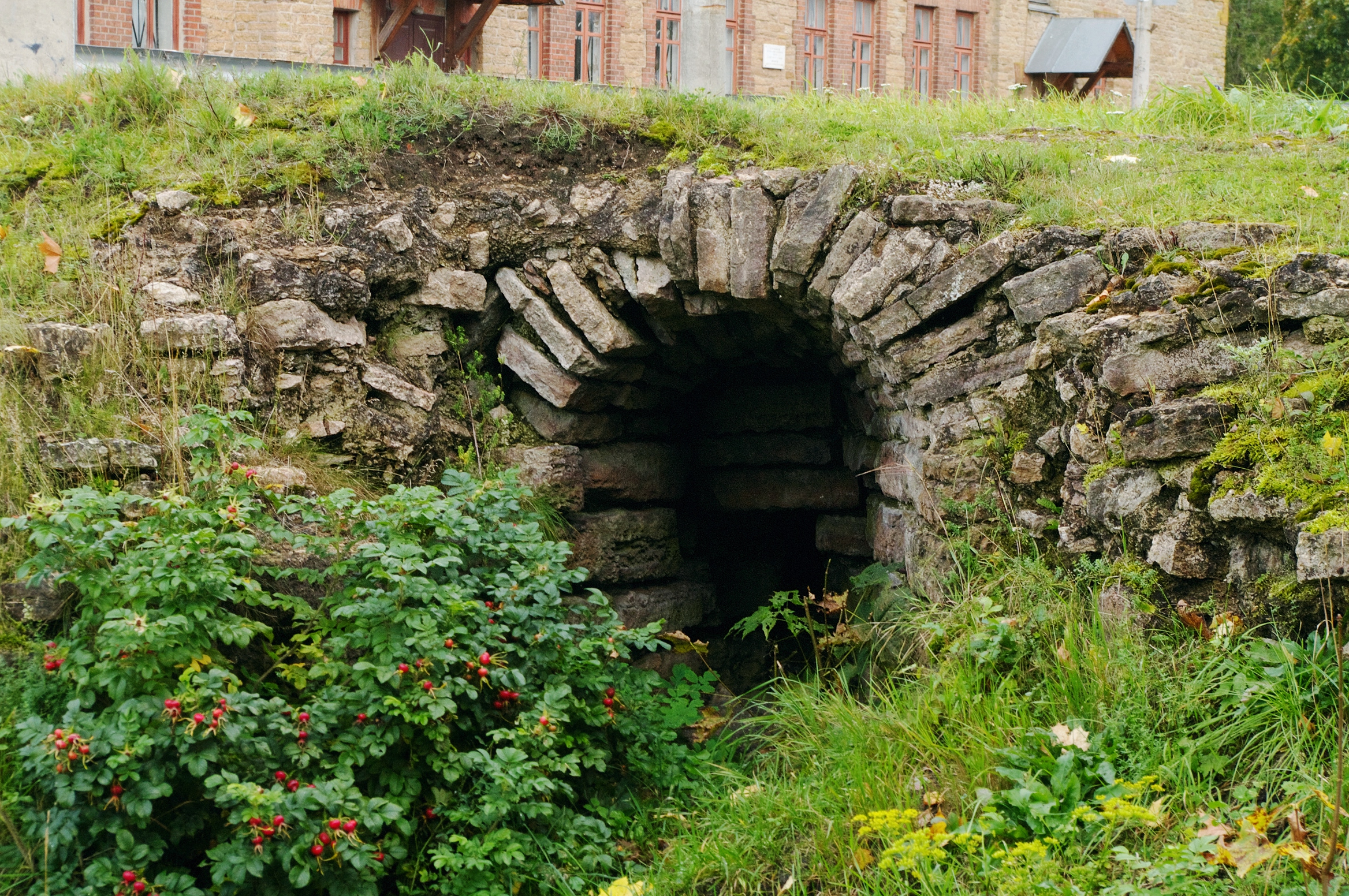
Part of the detinets' tower basement

In the second quarter of the 18th century, Yamburg fortress was disarmed because the Russian military command had abandoned static defensive position tactics. It remained under military control and had some military departments (warehouses and so on), but the ancient detinets having been left without any servicing or repairs had begun to collapse. In the 1760, by a decree of Catherine II, Yamburg became a city, so most of its buildings were demolished to build the new town with a regular plan. The detinets was destroyed and Antonio Rinaldi used some parts of its stone walls to build a Saint Catherine church in a 1762. In 1781, Catherine II, traveling from Petersburg to Revel had a look at the Yam fortress ruins and ordered the detinets destroyed completely because of its poor condition. Bastions had been preserved, but they were partially destroyed at the end of the 18th century to build a chintz factory.

In the middle of the 19th century, a military garrison was hosted in Yamburg town. At the beginning it was manned by the Irkutsky 93rd infantry regiment, but in 1881 it was moved to Finland and the Dvinsky 91st infantry regiment was moved at Yamburg in 1883. Then in 1893 it was replaced by the Tsaritsynsky 146th infantry regiment. They set up the park on the Yam fortress territory so it was named the Garden of the Tsaritsynsky 146th Regiment and held that name until the October Revolution.

In 1909, during the construction of the commercial school building, the southern part of Yam fortress was excavated to build the basement. Construction workers found some remains of the southern fortress tower and decided to move all construction works to the north and farther from the banks of the Luga.

=== Modern period ===
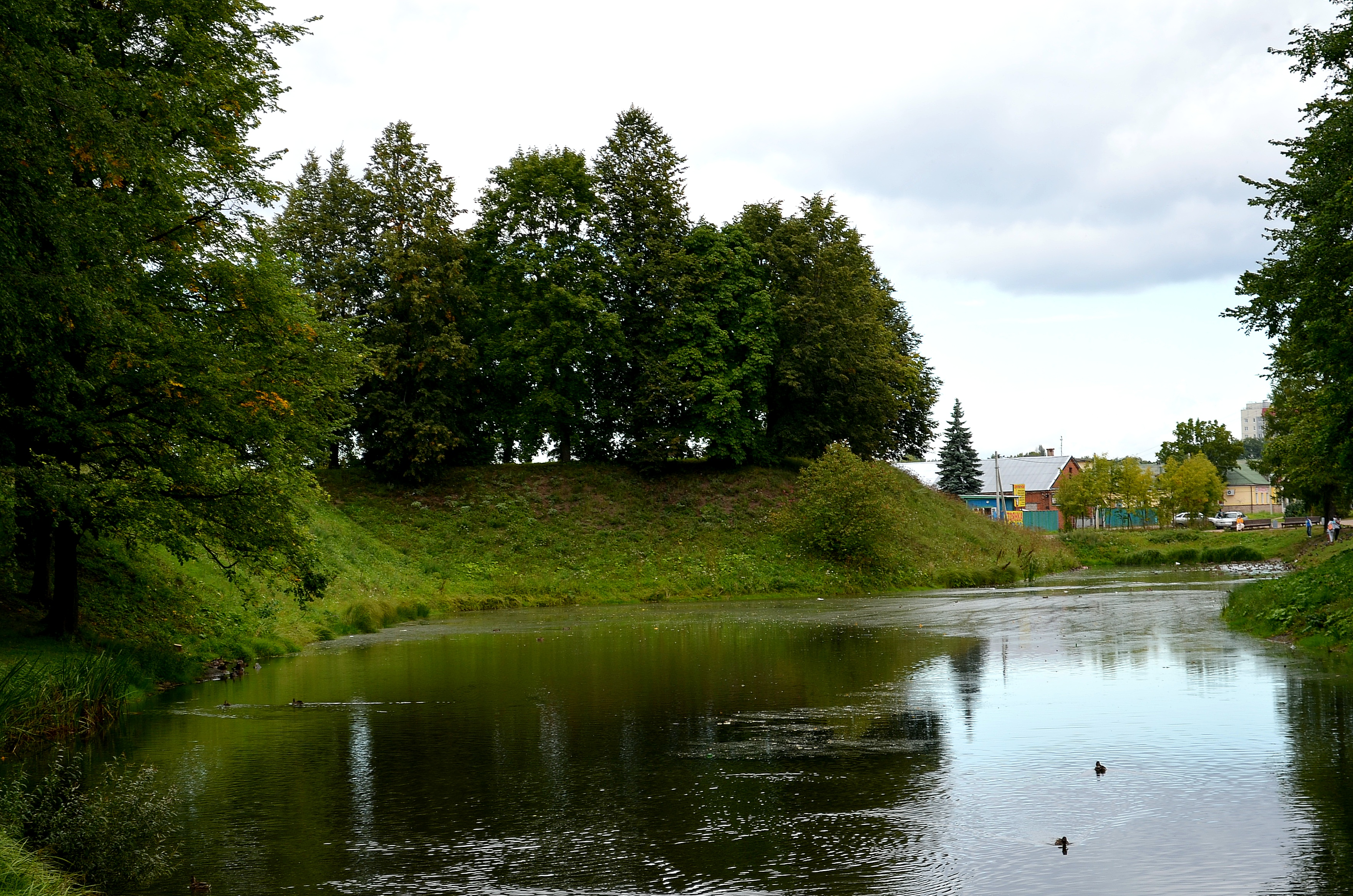
Pond in the park, formerly a fortress moat

As of 2021, there is still a park at the fortress' remains. It was called the Workers Garden (Russian: Сад трудящихся) during the Soviet era, but locals called it the Dark Garden (Russian: Тёмный сад), and in the post-Soviet era it was renamed the Summer Garden (Russian: Летний сад). At the northern side of the park, one can still see remains of two bastions. At the southern part of the territory, all the ground fortifications have been torn down; the stone ones were completely destroyed during the bridge construction in 1926. Also, the Saint Petersburg–Narva road was on the location of the detinets. On its northern side, the commercial school building stands, but it has now become the local history museum. Moats on the north and south, and a pond on the east, mark the outline of the fortress. The pond has drainage to the Luga river through the northern moat. In some places, there are still remains of a masonry on the surface.

During the Soviet era, the park had a cinema pavilion with a dance floor, but fire destroyed it and it has not been restored. In 1958, a monument to the Soviet partisans was erected in the south-east corner of the park.

In 2017, Rosterminalugol took over maintaining the park. The Ivangorod water utility service cleared the park's pond between June 24 and August 25, 2019. After that, a Biolight Oloid Pyramaid water cleaning system with a fountain was installed. Fry of the carp and carassius were released into the pond.

In June 2022, the park received a new addition: the local history museum with financial support of the Presidential Grants Foundation set up a few glass boards with paintings of a fortress, that are merging with current relief. As an addition, they have built a stele with pointers to different objects in the park and published an audio-guide at the «Easy Travel» platform.

== Architecture ==
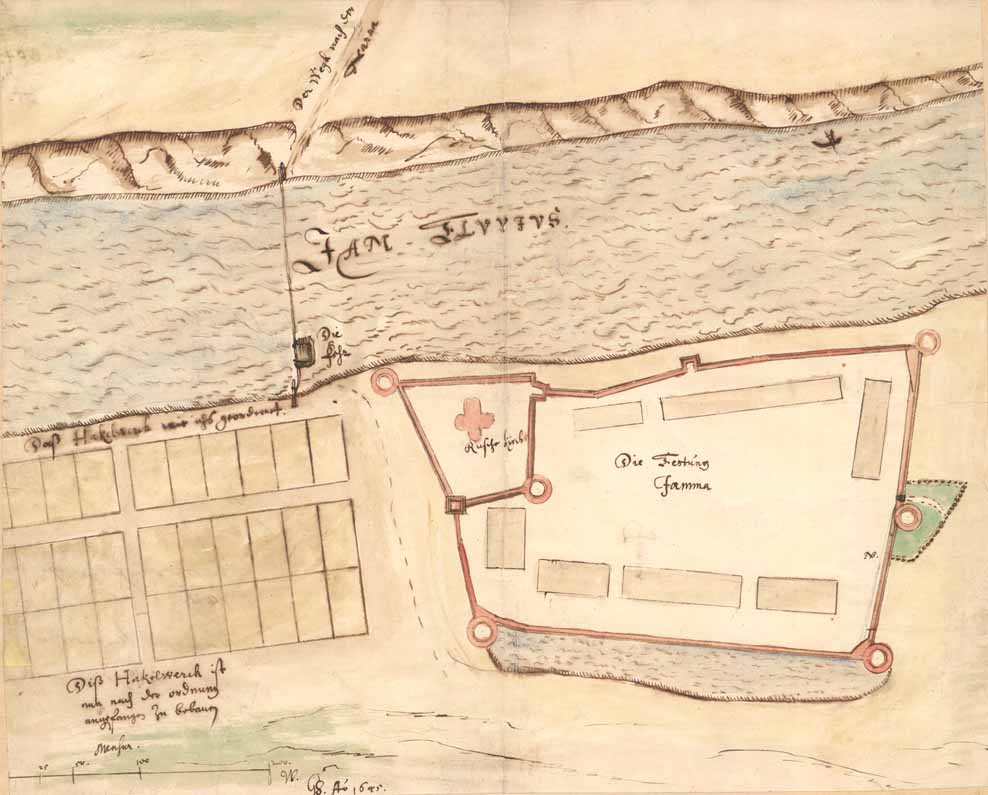
Swedish plan of a fortress made in 1645

The fortress was built on a high steep coast at the outside of the river bend. That gave additional obstacle for assault. From all sides fortress was surrounded by water: it had Luga river on its western side and moats on others. Fortress itself was built in trapezoid shape facing the river with a long base that also was slightly concaved. Walls was folded of limestone and was up to 4.5 meters wide. At the corners the fortress had four round towers, which were supplemented by square towers in the middle of western, northern and eastern walls. That gave the defenders an opportunity to crossfire. The detinets was located at the south-western corner of fortress and had mutual gates with it. A gate was placed westwards in two related square halftowers made of coarse limestone blocks stapled with mortar. The passage was 2 meters wide and 17.5 meters long, and it had 3 gates in it and a pit in front of the entrance with a single drawbridge.

The bastion fortress was built by the same plan as the old one and had 4 bastions at its corners, linked by curtains. In the south-western corner, between southern and western curtains old detinets was placed. The detinets' western wall and gate tower was built into the curtain and was used as an entrance. Because of this the south-western bastion was smaller than the others.

== Archeology ==
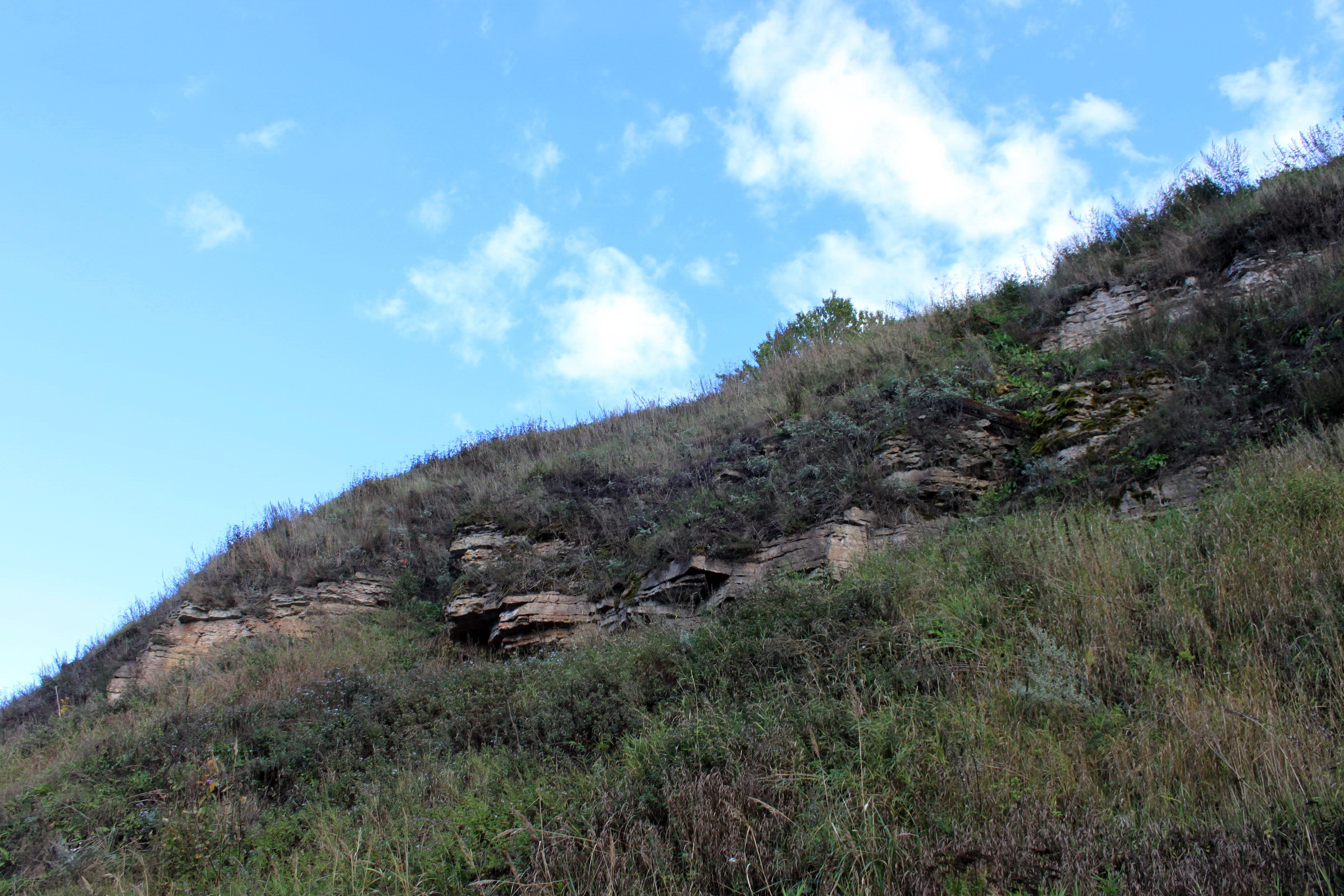
Walls remains on the Luga river bank

The first archeological research of the Yam fortress was undertaken in 1909 during the construction of the commercial school building when workers found remains of the southern tower with an embrasure facing the east. They also discovered the south-western tower remains; these were mostly destroyed during bridge construction in 1926. In 1950, Vladimir Kostochkin claimed that the southern tower was built at the beginning of the 16th century, based on its design features of its embrasure.

In 1971, the first major archeological research by the Leningrad branch of the Institute of Archeology of the Academy of Sciences of the Soviet Union under the direction of Anatoly Kirpichnikov was undertaken at the fortress territory. During this research, nine excavations were dug at the 960 m^{2} (10,300 sq ft) field. The eastern side of ancient settlement excavation showed a wall 4.5 m (15 ft) wide and 1.9 m (6 ft 3 in) high just under the sod, dated between the end of the 15th century and the beginning of the 16th century. Many items were discovered in the detinets and near the northern wall. They were attributed to both the Russian population of the 15th and 16th centuries and the Swedish soldiers of the 17th century. Few finds were attributed to the 14th and the beginning of the 15th centuries. The remains of one-apse church with four columns were discovered in the detinets. It was dated to the 14th century. All the research proved the accuracy of 1680 Swedish plans of the fortress that were stored in the Royal Military Archive in Stockholm. The archeologists discovered evidence of the destruction of southern part of the fortress in the 18th century. As a result of this research, in 1974, the Yam fortress archeological site was marked as a cultural heritage site in Russia.

Excavations performed in 2008 were aimed at studying the structure of the 17th century bastion fortress. As a result, a water pipe was discovered. It was placed on the bottom of the northern moat during backfill and was covered with a floodgate from a side of the pond that was formerly an eastern moat.

Some of the artifacts found during archaeological excavations were presented to the Kingisepp local history museum.

== Sources ==
- Аристов, В. В. (2009). Страницы Яма-Ямбурга-Кингисеппа в истории России и Европы [Pages of history of Yam—Yamburg—Kingisepp in Russian and European history] (in Russian). ISBN 978-5-99-01202-6-6.
- Косточкин, В. В. (1964). Древние русские крепости [Ancient Russian fortresses] (in Russian). М.: Наука.
- Ефимов, А. С. (1972). Кингисепп: Ист.-краевед. очерк [Kingisepp: historical feature article] (in Russian) (2-е изд., перераб. и доп. ed.). Л.: Лениздат.
- Кирпичников, А. Н. (1984). Отв. ред. П. А. Раппопорт Каменные крепости Новгородской земли [Stone fortresses of Novgorod land] (in Russian). Л.: Наука, Ленинградское отделение.
- Коллектив авторов. (2012). Крепость Ям [Yam fortress]. Крепости Северо-Запада России: от крепости к крепости (in Russian). Каламос.
- Скрипинская, Н. Ю. (2014). Бастионная система крепости Ямбург [Bastion system of a Yamburg fortress]. История и археология (in Russian) (6). Stratum Plus. Археология и культурная антропология: 240–251. ISSN 1608-9057.
