= Rosterminalugol =

Rosterminalugol JSC
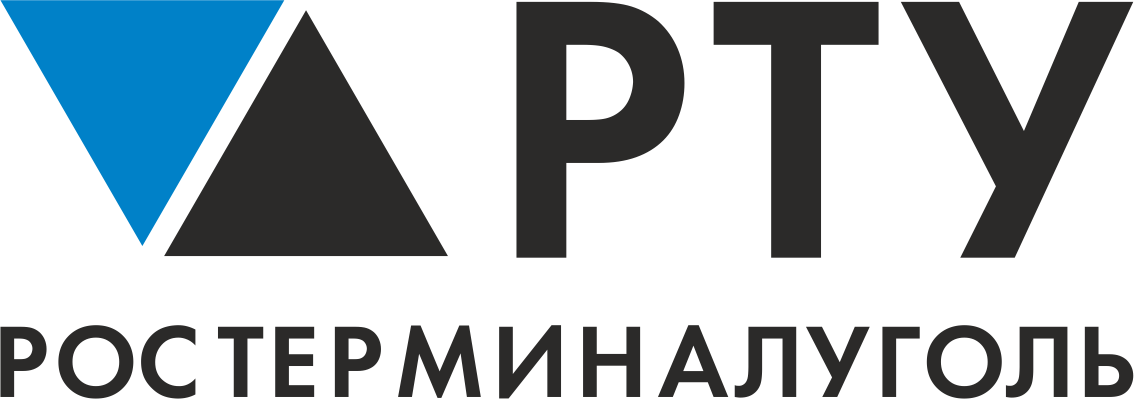
- Type: Joint-stock company
- Industry: Stevedoring activity, coal ports
- Founded: 1996
- Headquarters: Ust-Luga, Leningrad Oblast, Russia
- Key people: Evgeny Korban (managing director)
- Operating income: Freight throughput totals 18.1 million tonnes per year
- Parent: Port Management Company LLC
- Website: oao-rtu.ru

"Rosterminal" Joint Stock Company (Rosterminalugol) is the largest special-purpose coal port in the Northwest of Russia, built using new technology and providing customers in Europe, African countries, the Middle East and Latin America with Russian coal products from Kuzbass and other coal basins. The automatization level of the port's technological processes is 100%. In 2016, the year-end freight turnover of JSC 'Rosterminalugol' increased by 3.4% and reached an all-time high of 18.1 million tonnes, which represents more than 60% of coal handling in the Baltic basin ports and about 14% among all Russian coal ports.

== About the company ==
Since 2016, JSC 'Rosterminalugol' is a part of a port holding company whose managing activities are controlled by the 'Managing Port Company' LLC. The company is further implementing the port modernization project. The port is located in Luga Bay in the Gulf of Finland of the Baltic Sea, near the village Ust-Luga.

"Rosterminalugol" has two deep-water berths of a total of 565 meters in length and from 14 to 16 meters of depth near the piers. The maximum permitted draft is 12.7 and 14.55 meters. The advantageous geographic location of the Ust-Luga port, located in the southern part of Luga Bay of the Finnish Gulf, allows it to receive ships of the Panamax, handymax and post-Panamax classes with deadweight of up to 110kk tonnes, maximum width of up to 44 meters, and length of up to 260 meters, all year. On 24 June 2017 the terminal received the largest bulker in the company's and Ust-Luga port's history, which was the Navios Pollux ship (Capesize type). The deadweight capacity of the bulker is 180,000 tonnes, its length 292 meters and its width 45 meters.

The port is located far from residential and industrial areas.

== History ==
JSC 'Rosterminalugol' was founded in 1996 according to the order of the Russian Federation Government of 7 October 1996, No. 1488-р. The main goal of its construction was to create an independent outlet to European and American coal markets that was necessary for Russian companies for the independent realization of the transport policy in control of all the stages of cargo delivery from producer to customer.

In the planning stage, several variants were considered to solve the problem. The most promising one turned out to be the construction of the marine port 12 km Northwest of Ust-Luga village in the Kingiseppsky District of Leningrad Oblast, on the southern coast of Luga Bay in the Finnish Gulf. The distance from St. Petersburg along the ship's fairway is 130 km 'Rosterminalugol' was the beginning of the development of the Ust-Luga marine commercial port.

The energy capacity of the coal terminal 'Rosterminalugol', laid in the Baltics in 1996, was 8 million tonnes of coal per year at its highest. Today the energy capacity of JSC bird's eye view 'Rosterminalugol' exceeds the project more than 2 times, through constant modernization of equipment and automatizion of production and logistic processes.

In January 2006, the ceremonial launch of the automatic transshipment complex – the second stage of the coal terminal – took place in the presence of Vladimir Putin, the President of the Russian Federation. In May 2017, the 130-millionth tonne since the start of operations at the 'Rosterminalugol' terminal was loaded on the bulker Aiantas.

== Stevedoring activity ==
The annual freight turnover of the port is constantly increasing; in 2016, 'Rosterminalugol' set a record for the highest level of annual coal handling, having shipped more than 18 million tonnes of coal products. The growth rate per year was 3.4%. The loading of the 18 millionth tonne was carried out in a straightforward manner using the newly operative transfer point PS-11, which enables two railcar dumpers to be used simultaneously for unloading cars with coal, requiring the completion of contractual fractions before it can be loaded in the ship. In 2017, the port reached record performance:

- the maximum number of cars being unloaded was 1,259 per day and 675 per shift;
- the largest ship batch was loaded on the "Navios Pollux" motor ship - more than 128 kk tonnes

According to 2016 results, the number of processed cars has reached 252 kk units, and the port received 283 ships. Among the ships that were taken for loading, the majority were of the panamax type (69.6%), though technical capabilities of the port provided loading for a wide range of ships, from handymax (7.42%) to post-panamax (9.19%). The growth in freight turnover, increase in the number of cars unloaded, and the loading of ships with high freight-carrying capacity are enabled by increased performance of key units and elements of the port's technology chain, as well as the use of more rational routes for coal unloading from cars to storehouses and further loading on ships.

The largest export destinations shipping through JSC 'Rosterminalugol' remain the Netherlands, Germany, the UK and Turkey.

== Equipment ==
"Rosterminalugol" provides automatic processing of coal handling from railroad to marine transport. The unloading of coal cars is carried out by two up-to-date, high-tech, tandem railcar dumpers that enable the unloading of 4 gondolas simultaneously in less than 3 minutes. At the same time, the rolling stock is not subjected to any mechanical damage, which is possible during gripper unloading. Transboarders were implemented and now are successfully operational for the first time in Russia, to allow for fast formation of empty stock on terminal railways. They help to speed up rolling stock feeding on several parallel routes without using additional railroad switches. There are devices for defrosting cars that are equipped with infrared emitters to provide fail-safe unloading of loaded cars in the wintertime. Afterward, the unloaded coal falls on the transporter tape through a grid with cells of 280 mm in diameter. Then, having passed through the aspirate machine system of coal transporter lines, the coal is automatically transported either in one of four storehouses or directly in the ship, depending on the loading scheme. Ship loading is carried out by two high-performance ship loading machines on the two piers, which allow for the operation of two panamax ships simultaneously.

Coal decontamination and refinement into fractions that are necessary for clients, as well as the continuous selection of coal samples, are done during the transshipment process immediately before loading. Control of the production process in real-time, including fast cargo registration, information exchange with JSC "RZD" and clients, and electronic document workflow, is implemented in the company. All main port units are equipped with a video monitoring system.

An increase in freight turnover remains one of the main goals of the port, along with an increase in the quality of services provided: ensuring an uninterrupted chain of delivery and shipment on the most effective ship types for the formation of new routes for Russian coal shipping. An important role in the process is played by the sorting complex of the Luzhskaya-Sortirovochnaya railway station, which was launched by JSC "RZD".

== Ecology ==
JSC "Rosterminalugol" implements a long-term program to raise the environmental safety of stevedoring activities. The company has adopted environmental policies that meet international standards. Environmental safety is carried out in conformity with ISO 14001:2004 standard "Environmental management systems. Transshipment of cargo in seaport".

To prevent a negative impact on water bodies and to assist environmental recovery and conservation of the ecological balance of the Baltic Sea region, in accordance with the international agreement HELCOM (Baltic Marine Environment Protection Convention, adopted in Helsinki in 1992) JSC "Rosterminalugol" finished the reconstruction of sewage treatment plants and water purification systems in December 2016. A new automatic wastewater treatment system installed in the port uses dispersion-reagent nanoflotation technology. It brings mixed-utility domestic and rainwater flow to optimal indexes of the maximum permitted norms for wastewater, and it fully cleanses drains of coal dust and organic materials. The use of chemical reagents for cleaning in the system is significantly reduced, and its high effectiveness and compactness of structures allows for reduced power consumption. There are engineer-ecologists working in the port, and environmental monitoring and auditing take place regularly. The company cares about bioresource recovery and it organizes events for the planting of trees; in November 2016, with the leadership and funding of 'Rosterminalugol', more than 1,300 two-year-old bulltrout fish were released in the Svir River. The total amount of the port's investment in environmental companies between 2014 and 2016 was more than 200 million Rubles. In December 2016, JSC 'Rosterminalugol', along with the administration of Kingiseppsky District of the Leningrad Oblast, signed a five-year cooperation agreement in the field of increasing environmental safety and environmental education of people.

== See also ==
- Ust-Luga
- Ust-Luga (port)
- Luga Bay
- Finnish Gulf
- Baltic Sea
