= Port Kozmino =

Port in Russia

Coordinates: 42.730874°N 133.027267°E

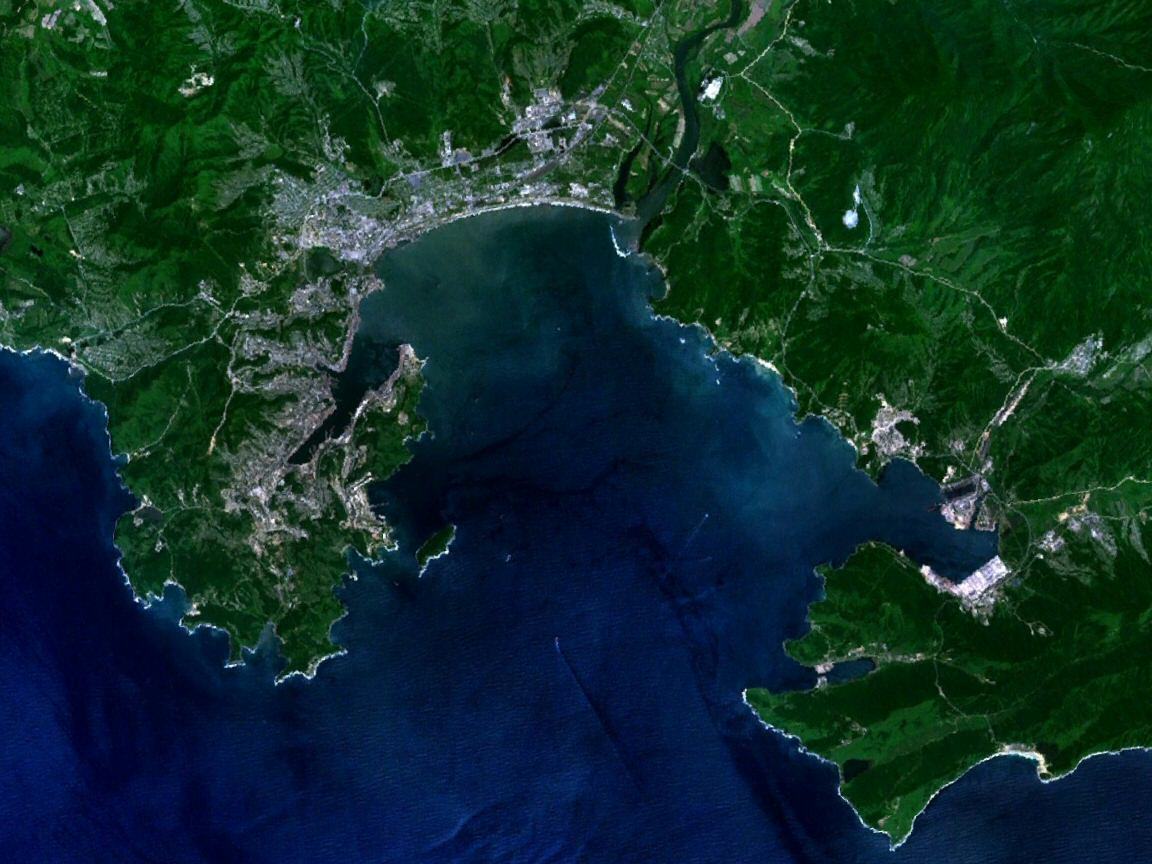
Port of Kozmino is the eastern-most settlement on Kozmino Bay; across the water of Nakhodka Bay is the city of Nakhodka

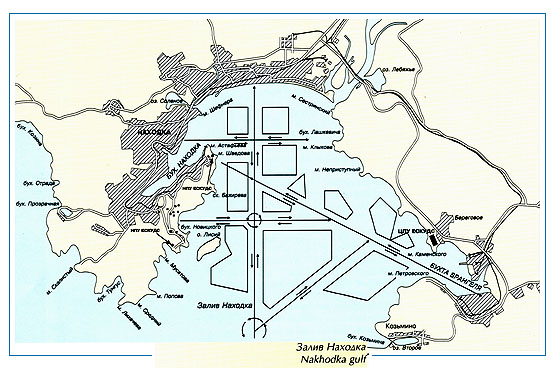
Kozmino Bay in the Nakhodka Bay

Port Kozmino (Russian: Порт Козьмино) is an oil port 85 kilometres (53 mi) southeast of Vladivostok on the Nakhodka Bay near Nakhodka, Primorsky Krai, Russia and close to Russia's borders with China and North Korea, on the coast of the East Sea.

Kozmino is the terminal point of the Eastern Siberia – Pacific Ocean pipeline (since end of 2012). With the opening of its terminal on December 28, 2009, the port of Kozmino instantly became Russia's third-most important oil outlet.
