= Free port of Vladivostok =

Status of Vladivostok Port

The Free port of Vladivostok (Russian: Свободный Порт Владивосток, СПВ) is a special investment regime in the Russian Far East. Since its establishment in 2015, the government has assured that the Free Port would create a distinctive economic zone, attracting foreign investments, facilitating technology transfer, and fostering international expertise, all while promoting grassroots entrepreneurialism.

== Special Investment Regime ==
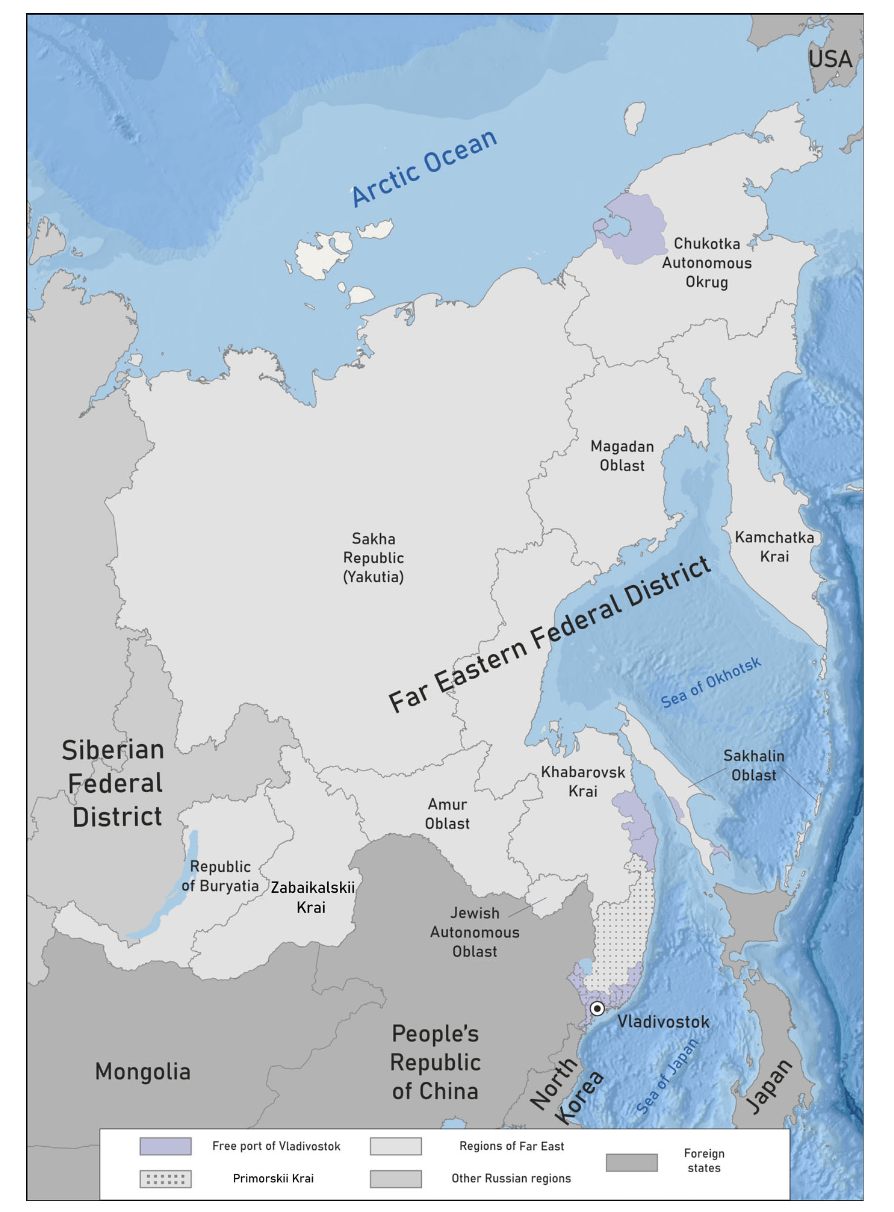
Map of the Far Eastern Federal District and Territories of the Free Port Vladivostok (Sept. 2020)

The Federal Law No. 212-FZ ‘On Free Port Vladivostok’ outlines four interrelated goals:

- creating a new regional administrative system;
- creating new industries with the use of innovative technologies;
- reorienting the specialisation of the region to the export of manufactured products;
- and developing trade with countries of the Asia-Pacific region.

Individual entrepreneurs or commercial organizations can qualify as Free Port "residents" if they meet four criteria:

- They must be legally registered within the Free Port's territory;
- They need to propose a new investment project or business activity;
- They must plan to invest a minimum of R5,000,000 within three years of obtaining resident status;
- Residents must not engage in oil and natural gas extraction, certain service industries (except for tourism and rental services), or the production of excisable goods (with exceptions like cars and motor oil).

Residents are promised tax benefits, a more flexible visa system, protection from time-consuming audits, and the ability to utilize customs procedures specific to the free economic zone. The Ministry for the Development of the Russian Far East is tasked with providing administrative support to residents through trade and investment promotion agencies.

As it is obvious from the name of this special regime, its prime target was Vladivostok, the capital of Primorskii Krai and, since December 2018, the administrative centre of the Far Eastern Federal District. Later, however, the territory of the Free Port was expanded to cover other parts of the Far East, including municipalities in Khabarobsk Krai and Chukotka Autonomous Okrug.

In September 2019, Indian Prime Minister Narendra Modi signed a Memorandum of Intent for the Chennai–Vladivostok Maritime Corridor, a sea route covering approximately 5,600 nautical miles, or about 10,300 km, aimed at increasing bilateral trade between India and Russia.

== Historical Legacies ==
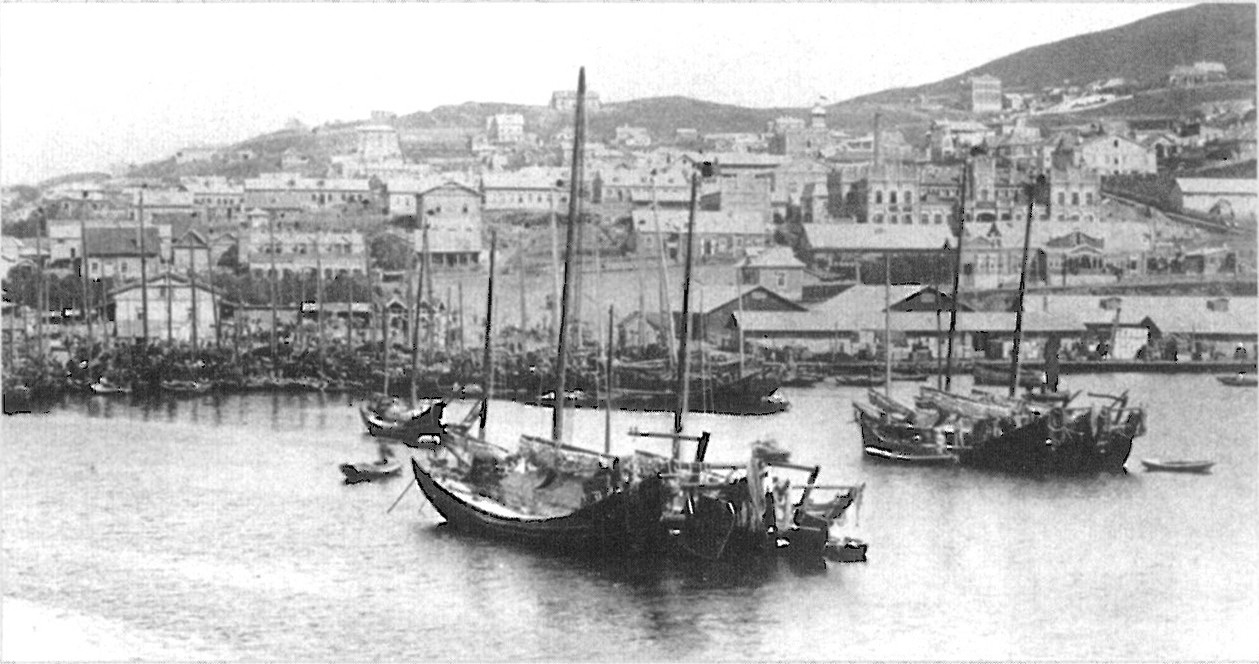
Port of Vladivostok in the beginning of the 20th century

Vladivostok's rich historical legacy plays a crucial role in promoting the Free Port regime.

In the 19th century, the introduction of duty-free trade along the coasts of the Sea of Okhotsk and the Sea of Japan significantly boosted the development of the Russian Far East. The free-trade regime began in Kamchatka in 1828, expanded to the Amur region in the mid-1850s, and by 1860, covered the entire territory of today's Primorskii Krai, including Vladivostok, established that same year as a military fort post. Vladivostok enjoyed the special status until 1909. In 1902, Tsarist statesman Sergei Witte referred to the Russian Far East as 'the kingdom of free trade.' During this time, "ideas about free trade occupied the centre of the political imagination" in the Russian Far East.

Building on these legacies, official narratives stress that the Free Port is not a novel concept but a revival of the region's historical geopolitical role. According to Article 1 of the Federal Law No. 212-FZ, the Free Port's mission is to reclaim Vladivostok and the Russian Far East's historical status as Russia's 'eastern sea gateway' and to foster integration into the Asia-Pacific economy. Correspondingly, media reports, expert commentary, academic analyses, and presentations of investment promotion agencies use the term 'porto franco' to describe the Free Port regime, implying that it will rejuvenate free trade and open up the regional economy.

However, the use of the term 'porto franco' and historical parallels with 19th-century duty-free trade regimes can be misleading. While federal policymakers initially emphasized promoting international trade as a primary goal for the Free Port, by 2020, five years later, it was evident that their intention was not to transform Vladivostok—or any part of the Russian Far East—into a free-trade zone. Importantly, it is increasingly clear that the Free Port does not align with the proclaimed market calculations and is not positioned to become a neoliberal exception to the political and economic norms prevailing in Russia.

== Criticisms ==
According to the Russian economist and sociologist Vladislav Inozemtsev, the Russian Far East is not rich enough to constitute an interesting entry point in Russia for investors; the presence of a military fleet base in Vladivostok could be a problem; moreover, Vladivostok is located too close from the Chinese border, and especially from Dalian, also a free port. On another hand, he reproaches that the law lets the possibility to review and cancel the status of free port at any time, which means that stability is not granted for investors.

Critics argue that the Free Port's impact on economic diversification might be limited. They also point out that the Free Port fails to attract substantial foreign direct investment. Some critics argue that the relatively small number of projects from China, Japan, and South Korea suggest that the region lacks sufficient infrastructure to support the influx of investments from the Asia-Pacific region.

Some businesses have encountered bureaucratic challenges and red tape, hindering the ease of doing business. Despite the intended streamlining of procedures, there may still be bureaucratic hurdles that impede the efficient operation of companies within the Free Port.
