= DeloPorts =

Port company

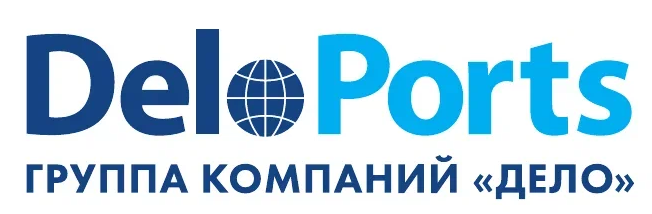

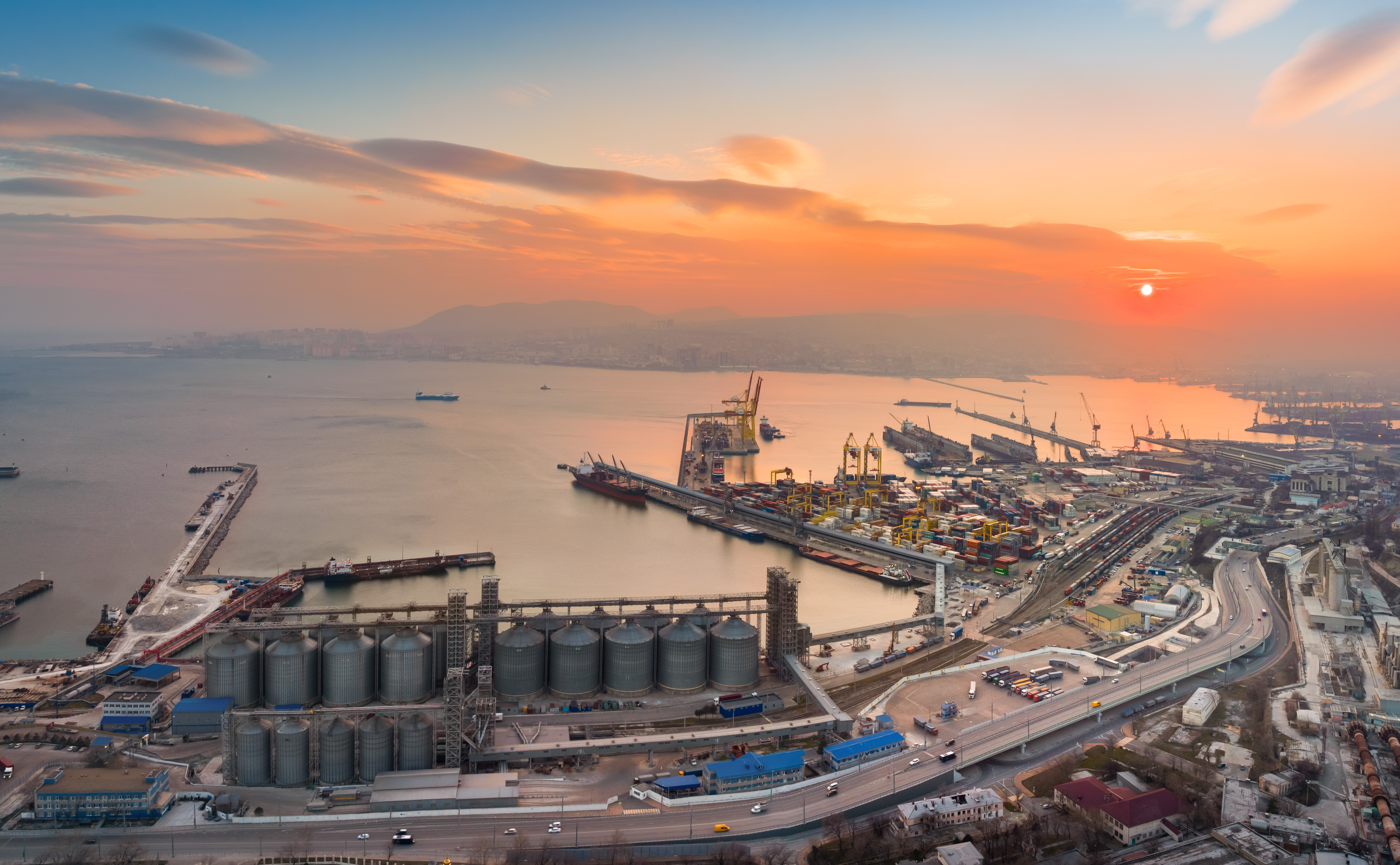
- NUTEP and KSK terminals
- Native name: ДелоПортс
- Company type: private company
- Parent: Delo Group
- Subsidiaries: KSK, NUTEP, SC Delo
- Website: http://deloports.com

DeloPorts is a Russian stevedoring holding entrusted with overseeing the assets of Delo Group in the Novorossiysk Sea Port. Under its corporate umbrella, DeloPorts houses the NUTEP Container Terminal, KSK Grain Terminal and Delo Service Company, a dedicated provider of vessel towing services.

== History ==
The company's origins trace back to 2012 when it was registered in Limassol, Cyprus. Its primary role was to serve as a holding structure for the assets of Delo Group in the seaport of Novorossiysk. Initially, the company's ownership was divided with Sergey Shishkarev, the owner of Delo Group of Companies (90%), and his nephew Timofey Telyatnik (10%). Telyatnik also assumed the role of the company's president. However, in July 2015, Sergey Shishikarev bought out Telyatnik's stake and became the sole owner of the company. After this, Shishkarev transferred the companies to Russian jurisdiction.

At its inception, the structure of DeloPorts encompassed the Kombinat Stroykomplekt grain terminal (later renamed KSK), the NUTEP container terminal, the TOS towing company (later renamed Delo Service Company) and the Novorossiysk Oil Transshipment Complex. In 2013, a 100% stake of the Novorossiysk Oil Transshipment Complex was sold to Gazprom Neft structures. Also in 2013, DeloPorts sold a 25% stake in the KSK Terminal to the agricultural commodity trader Cargill.

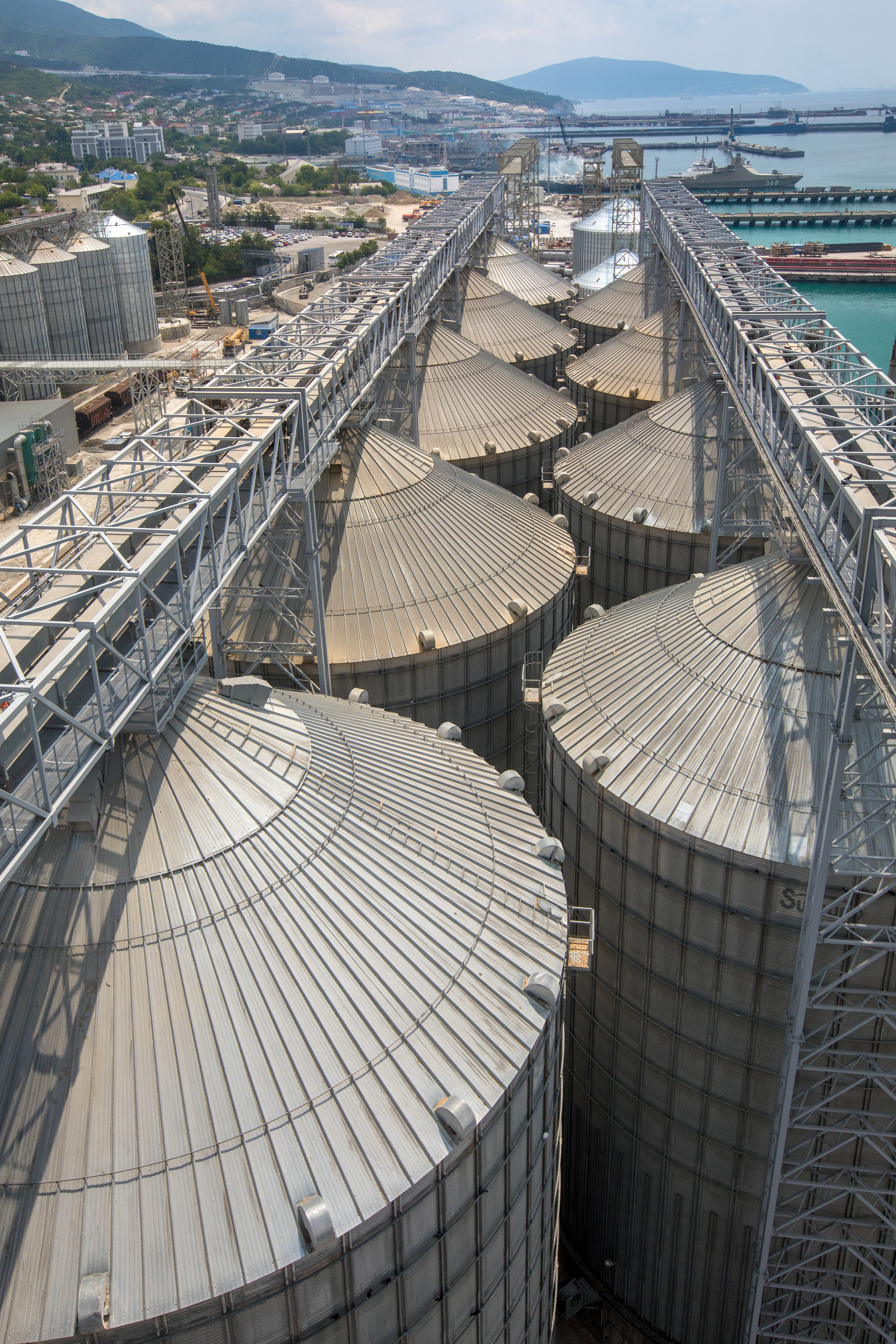
Grain elevators in KSK terminal

== Structure ==
- KSK grain terminal stands as the largest grain terminal in the Azov-Black Sea basin, boasting substantial transshipment capacity based on the results of the 2022/2023 grain season. It commenced operations in 2006. The terminal's throughput capacity is 7 million tons. The total area of the terminal is 13.1 hectares. KSK conducts transshipment activities across three berths and holds the distinction of being the sole grain terminal with direct access from the M4 Don federal highway. Between 2018and 2019, the terminal completed the construction of additional silos with a capacity of 102 thousand tons, of an additional line for receiving grain from rail and road transport, and work was also carried out to expand its own certified grain quality testing laboratory. Following these modernization efforts, the total silo capacity surged to 220 thousand tons, the daily truck reception capacity soared to 700 grain carriers, and the railway capacity was enhanced to accommodate 180 freight cars daily. In 2021, a deep-water berth labeled 40a was put into operation. This addition enabled the simultaneous reception of two vessels, each capable of carrying up to 100 thousand tons. Such vessels facilitated grain cargo deliveries to Southeast Asia. Remarkably, during the 2022/2023 grain season, the terminal impressively processed a total of 7.6 million tons of grain, marking a 46% increase compared to the previous season.
- NUTEP container terminal stands as the primary destination for container transshipment in Novorossiysk boasting a commanding share of 76.3% in 2022. The terminal's annual capacity is 700 thousand TEUs. With an extensive 34-hectare expanse, it features a dedicated park replete with 7 receiving and departure tracks, facilitating the formation of accelerated container trains. It further benefits from direct road access to the M4 Don federal highway. NUTEP excels in receiving and dispatching containers via sea, rail, and road, accommodating both Panamax and Post-Panamax vessels. In 2019, a deep-water berth No. 38 with a depth of 15 meters capable of receiving ocean-going container vessels with a capacity of up to 10 thousand TEUs, was put into operation at the NUTEP container terminal. In 2022, the terminal processed 582.5 thousand TEUs, which is 6.8% more than in 2021 and became an absolute record for transshipment volumes. Furthermore, in December 2022, the terminal achieved yet another milestone by setting a monthly record, surpassing 64.4 TEUs. This achievement eclipsed the previous record set in March 2021.
- Delo Service Operator is the provider towing services for vessels in the port of Novorossiysk using tugs supplied by Damen Shipyards. Its own fleet comprises six ASD Tug 2310 tugs, ensuring efficient and reliable services. Beyond towing, DSC also extends agency and bunkering services to vessels navigating the port of Novorossiysk.

== Ratings ==
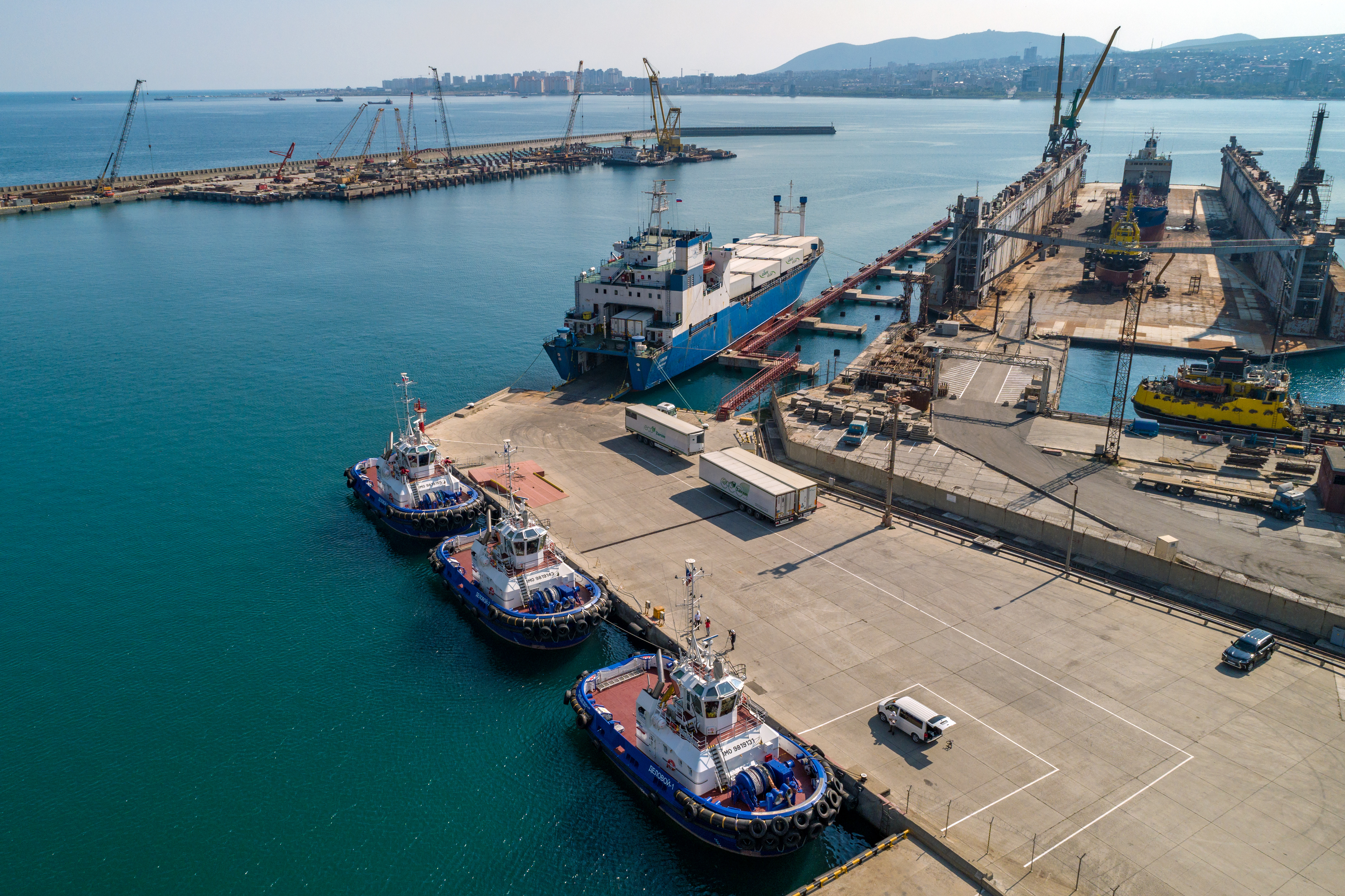
3 ASD Tug 2310

In October 2019, the Expert RA rating agency reaffirmed DeloPorts' credit rating, bestowing it with a ruA rating alongside a stable outlook.

In 2023, earned a prestigious rating in the domains of ecology, social responsibility, and management, as conferred by the Russian Analytical Credit Rating Agency (ACRA). The company was assigned an ESG-5 rating and placed in the ESG-C category, underscoring its commitment to key factors of sustainable development.
