= TransContainer =

Russian transportation company

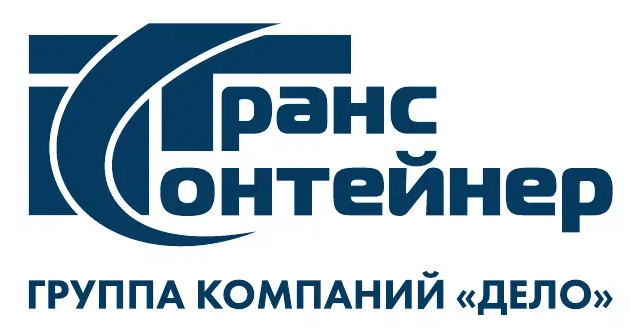
- Native name: ТрансКонтейнер
- Type: Public Joint Stock Company
- Industry: Container transportation
- Founded: 2006
- Headquarters: Moscow, Russia
- Revenue: 199,224,949,441 Russian ruble (2023)
- Operating income: 41,991,996,734 Russian ruble (2023)
- Net income: 20,014,289,386 Russian ruble (2023)
- Parent: Delo Group
- Website: trcont.com/en/

TransContainer is a Russian transportation company, Russia's largest railway container operator. The Company provides a full range of transportation and logistics services in integration with other assets of Delo Group. It is Russia's main intermodal container transport and integrated logistics company; it transports over a million TEUs per year.

== History ==
The genesis of this company traces back to October 2003 when a branch of Russian Railways JSC, gave birth to the Center for the Transportation of Cargo in Containers, better known as "TransContainer". In March 2006, this branch underwent a transformation, emerging as an open joint-stock company and subsequently becoming a subsidiary of Russian Railways OJSC. The operator started its business operations in July 2006.

In November 2010, TransContainer orchestrated an IPO, resulting in a reduction of Russian Railways OJSC's stake in the operator to 50% plus one share.

In July 2017, the operator acquired a 30% stake in Freight Village Kaluga North LLC from the Freight Village Ru group, which owns two multimodal transport and logistics centers (TLCs) – in Vorsino on the border of New Moscow and the Kaluga Oblast and Rosva near Kaluga (both TLCs are part of the same-name industrial parks and operate in the "cargo village" format).

In the same year, 2017, TransContainer expanded its footprint with the establishment of a subsidiary - SpetsTransContainer LLC. This subsidiary, serving as a competence center, played a pivotal role in the development of specialized container transportation.

In October 2017, TransContainer established a subsidiary – TransContainer Freight Forwarding (Shanghai) Co., Ltd – on the territory of the People's Republic of China in the Pilot Free Trade Zone of Shanghai.

In September 2018, TransContainer acquired from Global Ports a 100% stake in Logistics-Terminal CJSC, which manages a container yard in St. Petersburg (Shushary), with a capacity of 200 thousand TEU per year.

In September 2018, PJSC TransContainer registered a subsidiary, TransContainer Mongolia LLC in Ulaanbaatar.

In December 2019, Delo Group, following an open auction, secured a 50% ownership stake, plus two shares, of TransContainer from JSC Russian Railways. By March 2020, Delo Group of Companies had successfully consolidated a majority stake of 99.6% of the company's shares, and by August 2020, this consolidation extended to encompass the entirety of the operator's shares.

In November 2021, TransContainer acquired a second terminal (facilities of the property complex of Zabaikalsk International Terminal LLC) at the Zabaikalsk railway station, which is a strategic land crossing on the Russian-Chinese border.

By December 2022, the reconstruction of the Zabaikalsk terminal had undergone a comprehensive reconstruction, resulting in a tenfold increase in processing capacity since 2006, now having a capacity of 555 thousand TEU per year. The total investment volume for this endeavor surpassed 5 billion rubles.

In August 2023, TransContainer became founder of Container Terminal Usady LLC, which will build and operate a container terminal in Domodedovo District of Moscow Region. The facility with a design capacity of 424 thousand TEUs per year will be adjacent to the Usady railway station.

== Assets ==
The company manages both its own and leased container fleet, with a total capacity of 220 thousand TEUs, complemented by a fleet of 40 thousand well cars. At the same time, the share of transportation by rolling stock under the company's control in the railway container transportation market is 41%. TransContainer operates 40 own terminals in Russia, three of which are operated through subsidiaries and joint ventures. The company's sales network comprises over 90 offices situated within Russia, alongside representative offices positioned across the CIS countries, Europe and Asia. Moreover, the company's asset portfolio encompasses more than 480 motor vehicles and a fleet of 200 loading equipment units, attesting to its logistical capabilities and commitment to efficient operations.

== Ratings ==
TransContainer holds a credit rating from the Expert RA agency and a corporate governance rating assigned by the Russian Institute of Directors. According to the results of the fitting platform operator rating, INFOLine Rail Russia Top: No. 4 2022, TransContainer is a leader in this segment.

In December 2021, the ACRA rating agency assigned an ESG rating to PJSC TransContainer at ESG-4 level, ESG-B category. According to the methodology, such a rating means that the company pays increased attention to these issues.

Notably, TransContainer achieved a significant milestone by becoming the first Russian company to secure an international ESG rating. This accomplishment followed the exit of specialized American and European rating agencies from Russia. Among land transport and logistics companies evaluated by India's ESG Risk Assessments & Insights Limited (ESGRisk.ai), TransContainer emerged as the top performer. Within the comprehensive list of 1,026 positions that includes global companies, PJSC TransContainer claimed 32nd position.

== Social Project ==
Sergei Shishkarev, chairman of the Board of Directors of Delo Group, spearheaded a noteworthy demographic project launched in June 2022. This initiative is geared towards supporting families with children and contributing to the enhancement of the Russia's demographic landscape. Later, the project was extended to all assets of Delo Group.
