= Global Ports =

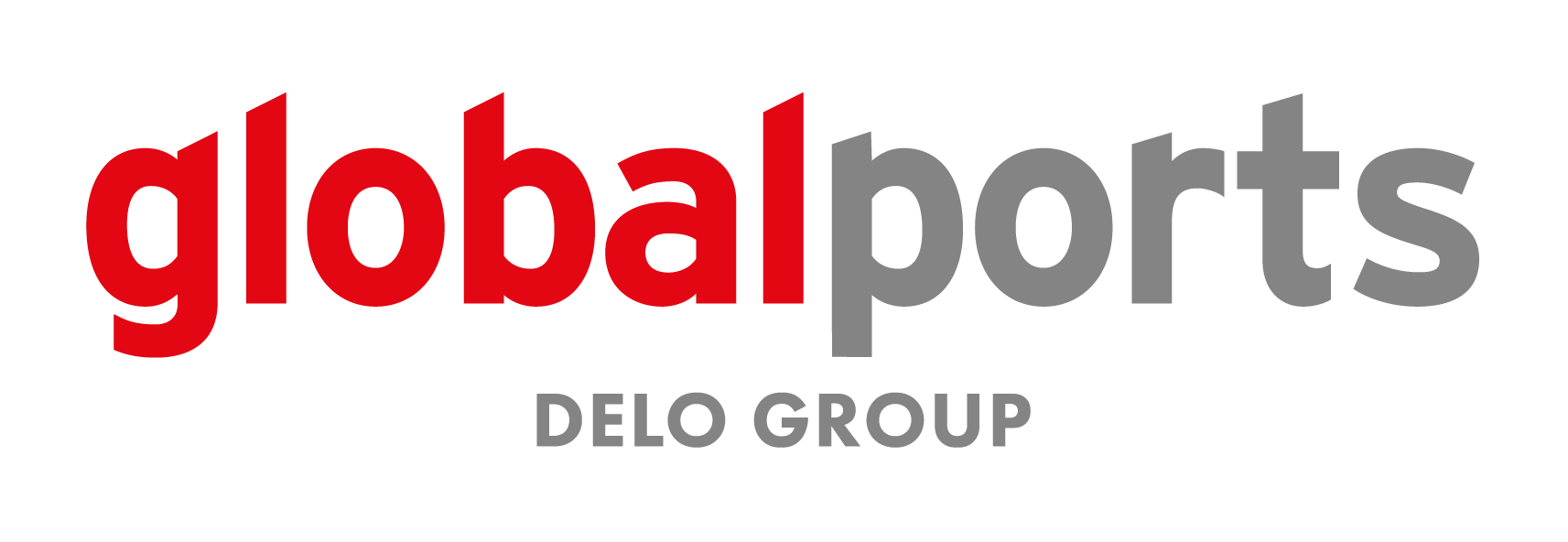
- Type: Public company
- Industry: Container terminal operator
- Founded: 2008
- Headquarters: Saint Petersburg, Russia
- Number of employees: 2960
- Website: https://www.globalports.com/en/

Global Ports is the foremost operator of container terminals in the Russian market. Global Ports’ terminals are located in the Baltic and Far Eastern basins. These areas serve as hubs for foreign trade cargo flows within the Russian Federation.

The Operator manages a total of five container terminals in Russia, including Petrolesport, First Container Terminal, Ust-Luga Container Terminal and Moby Dik all situated along the Baltic Sea. Additionally, in the Far East they oversee Eastern Stevedoring Company in Vostochny Port on the Sea of Japan. Beyond Russian borders, Global Ports extends its reach with two container terminals in Finland, specifically Multi-Link Terminals in Helsinki and Kotka. As part of its comprehensive infrastructure, Global Ports also includes the Yanino Logistics Park, a dry port located near St. Petersburg.

== History ==
Global Ports came into existence in 2008, built upon the foundation of port assets belonging to the N-Trans Group. The group included Eastern Stevedoring Company, Petrolesport, Moby Dik Container Terminal, Yanino Logistics Park and a 50% stake of Vopak EOS Oil Products Terminal.

In 2011, Global Ports initiated an IPO on the London Stock Exchange with the entire company's valuation standing at $2.35 billion. The offering itself totaled $534 million, with $100 million of that amount going to the company and the remainder to N -Trust. The company's free float was pegged at 25%.

In November 2012, APM Terminals, a terminal division of Maersk, acquired half of N-Trans's shares in Global Ports, representing a 37.5% stake in the company. In preparation for this transaction, Global Ports secured a 25% stake in the Eastern Stevedoring Company from the Arab port operator DP World.

In 2013, Global Ports bought the “National Container Company”. This encompassed 100% ownership of the First Container Terminal, 80% of the Ust-Luga Container Terminal and 100% of the Logistics-Terminal company (a dry port located in the south of St. Petersburg). In exchange for this acquisition, NCC transferred $291 million and 18% of its own shares to Global Ports. Consequently, the stakes held by major shareholders N-Trans and APM Terminals dipped from 37.5% to 30.75%, while the share of shares available for public trading dropped from 25% to 20.5%.

In 2017, made a strategic decision to sell 100% of Logistics-Terminal CJSC to TransContainer.

In 2018, Delo Group purchased a 30.75% stake in Global Ports from N-Tran.

In 2019, Global Ports sold the Vopak E.O.S. terminal in Estonia.

In 2022, Delo Group increased its stake in Global Ports to 61.5% by purchasing shares owned by APM Terminals.

In 2023, Global Ports Group initiated the process of delisting and concluding the GDR program on the London Stock Exchange. Additionally, the Company made a strategic decision to redomicile from the Republic of Cyprus to the Russian Federation, establishing a presence in a special administrative region (SAR) on the territory of Russky Island in the Primorsky Krai.

== Assets ==
The sea container terminals under the banner of Global Ports have a total capacity of 3.9 million TEUs, occupying a sprawling 400-hectare area. The workforce comprises 2,960 individuals.

=== First Container Terminal ===
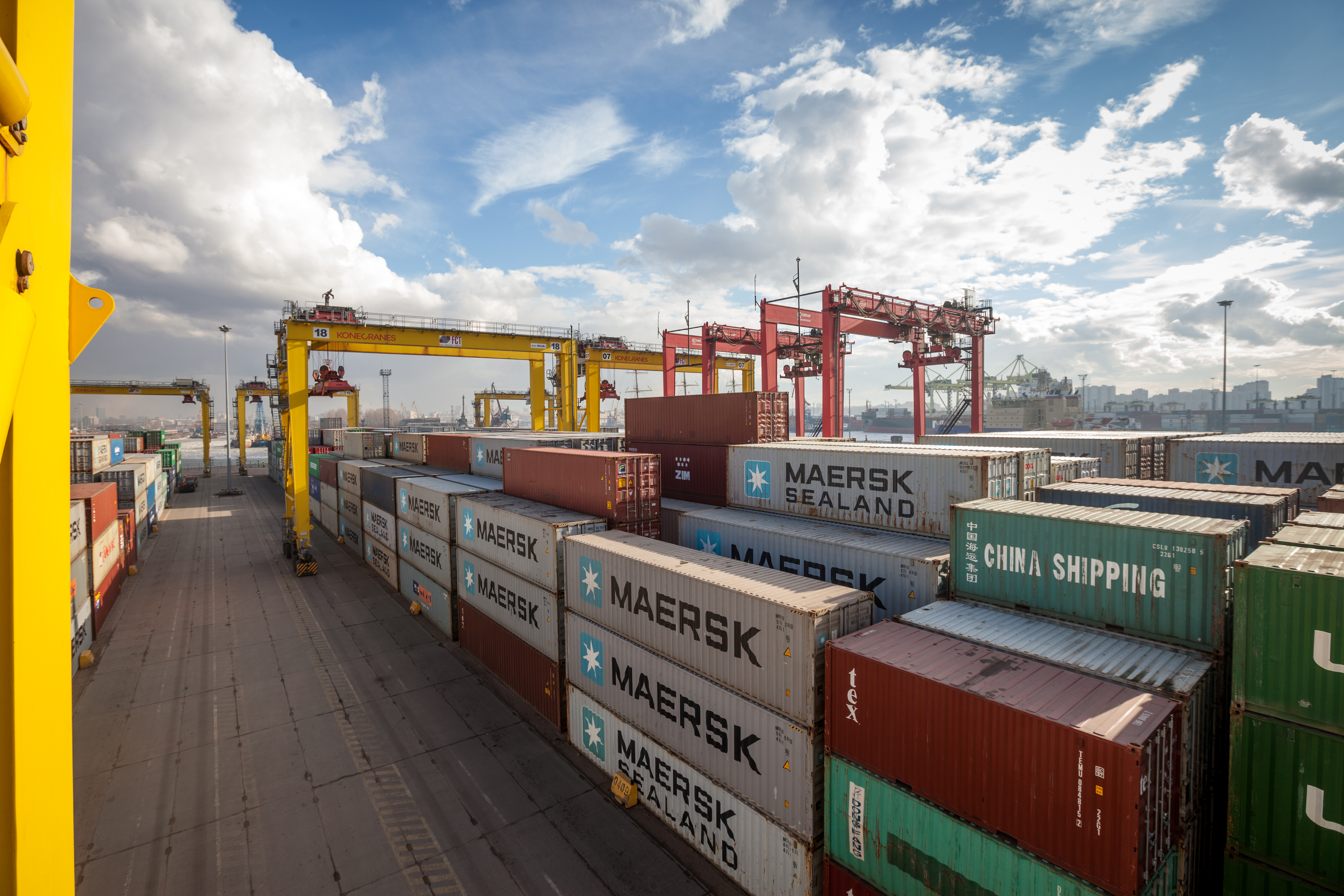
First Container Terminal

First Container Terminal is the largest container terminal in Russia. Nestled within the Big Port of St. Petersburg its inception dates back to 1973 when it was established as the USSR's very first specialized container terminal. In 1998, First Container Terminal JSC emerged from the container terminal of the St. Petersburg port. FCT is connected by regular direct communications with major Asian ports and by direct rail and road communications with the central regions of Russia.

=== Petrolesport ===
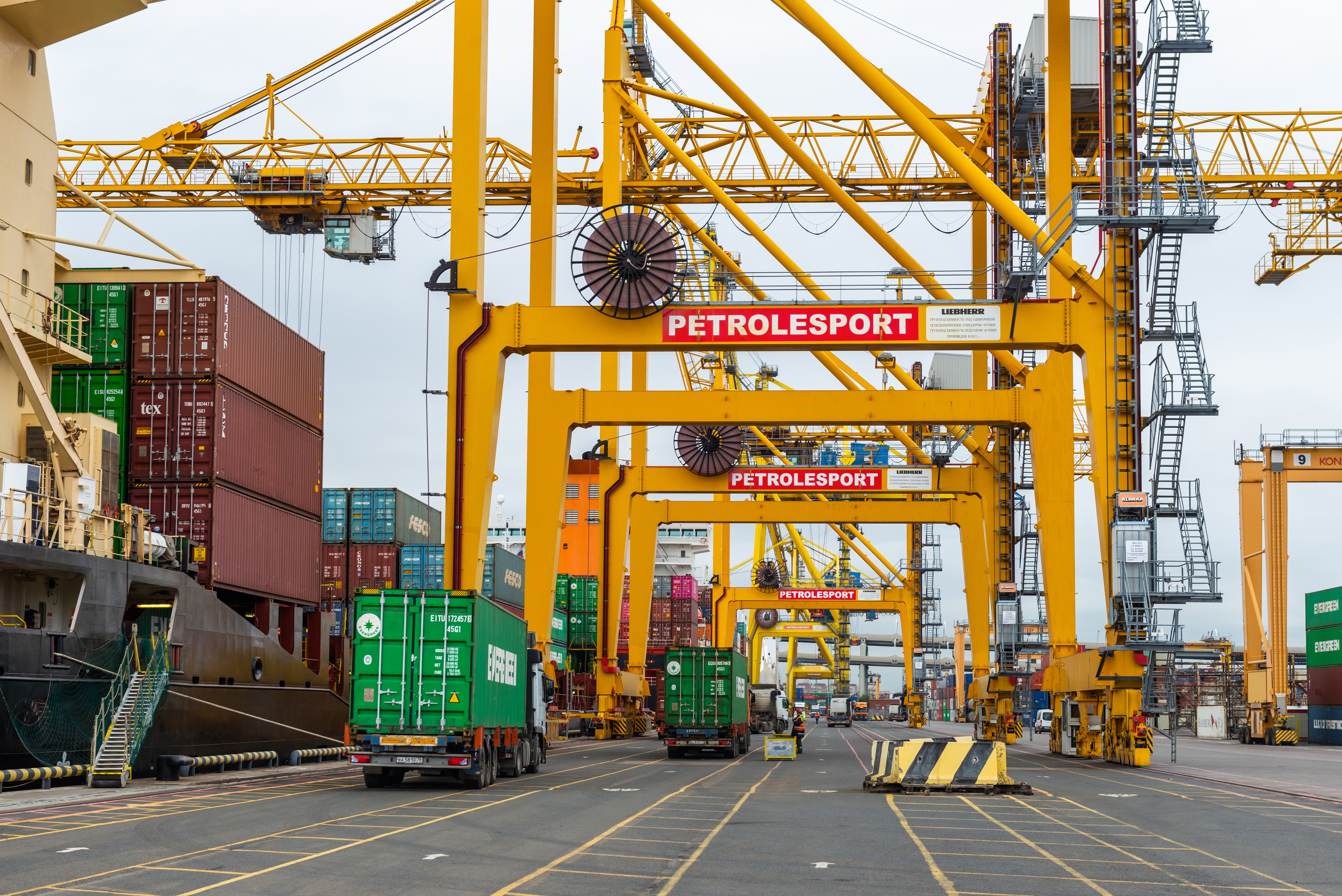
Petrolesport

Petrolesport is a stevedoring company operating in the Northwest region of Russia. Its strategic location resides within the maritime expanse of St. Petersburg spanning across Gutuevsky, Volny, Gladky and Grebenka islands. Petrolesport is seamlessly integrated into direct rail and road networks that connect to the central regions of Russia. The terminal's roots trace back to the late 19th century when Lesnoy Port was established. It handles a diverse array of cargo types, encompassing containers, roll-on/roll-off, timber cargo, scrap metal, metal products, ferrous and non-ferrous metals, project cargo, including heavy and oversized equipment.

=== Vostochnaya Stevedoring Company ===
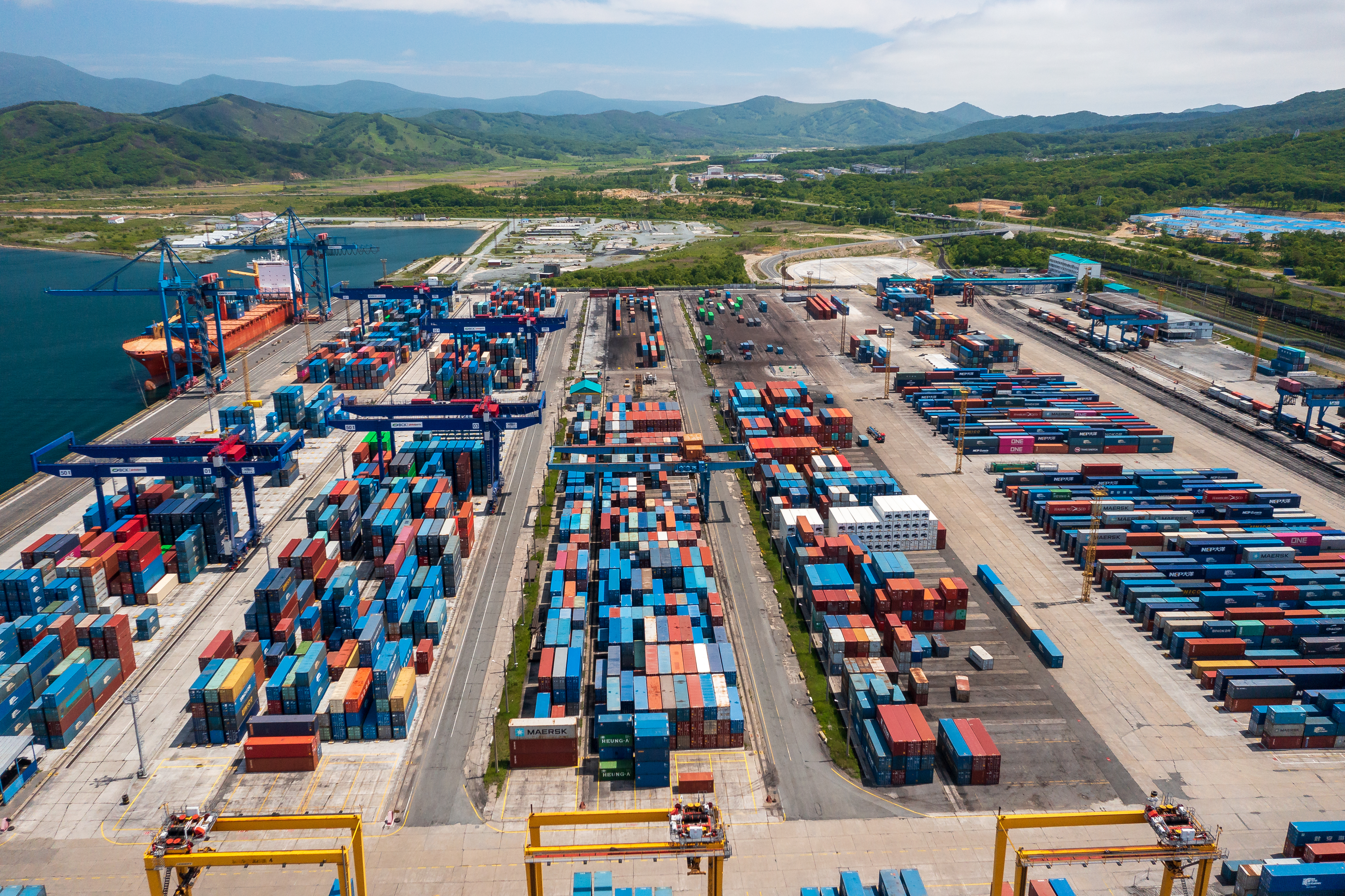
Vostochnaya Stevedoring Company

Eastern Stevedoring Company reigns as the largest container terminal in the Far East and is positioned in the deep-water, ice-free Pacific port of Vostochny in the village of Vrangel, near Nakhodka. The terminal's roots stretch back to 1976 when the container terminal that underpins the company's foundation was put into operation, marking it as the second specialized container terminal in the USSR. ESC enjoys direct access to the Nakhodka-Vostochnaya railway station and to the Trans-Siberian Railway.

Accelerated container train formation and dispatch represent aspects of the terminal's operations. Notably, from 2011 to 2021, a dedicated complex for coal cargo transshipment operated within the terminal's premises. In August 2022, ESC achieved a milestone by processing 66.6 thousand TEUs, marking its best monthly performance to date. The total throughput capacity of ESC is 700 thousand TEU per year.

=== Ust-Luga Container Terminal ===
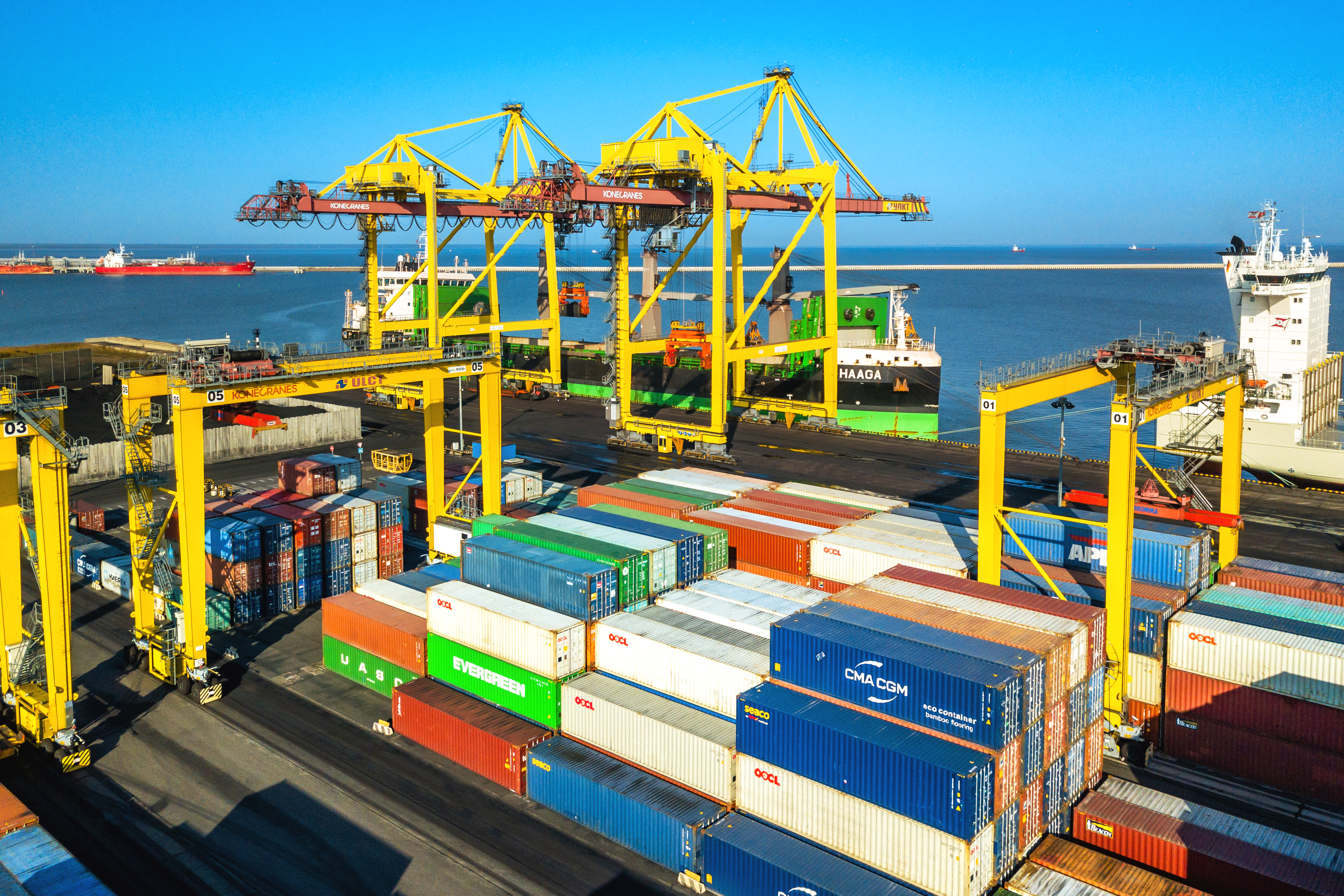
Ust-Luga Container Terminal

Ust-Luga Container Terminal operates within the new deep-water port of Ust-Luga in Luga Bay of Gulf of Finland. On December 29, 2011, the terminal welcomed its inaugural vessel. Since December 2018, the terminal has been handling coal cargo, with the railway infrastructure and terminal capacity enabling the shipment of up to 1 million tons of coal annually.

=== Moby Dik ===
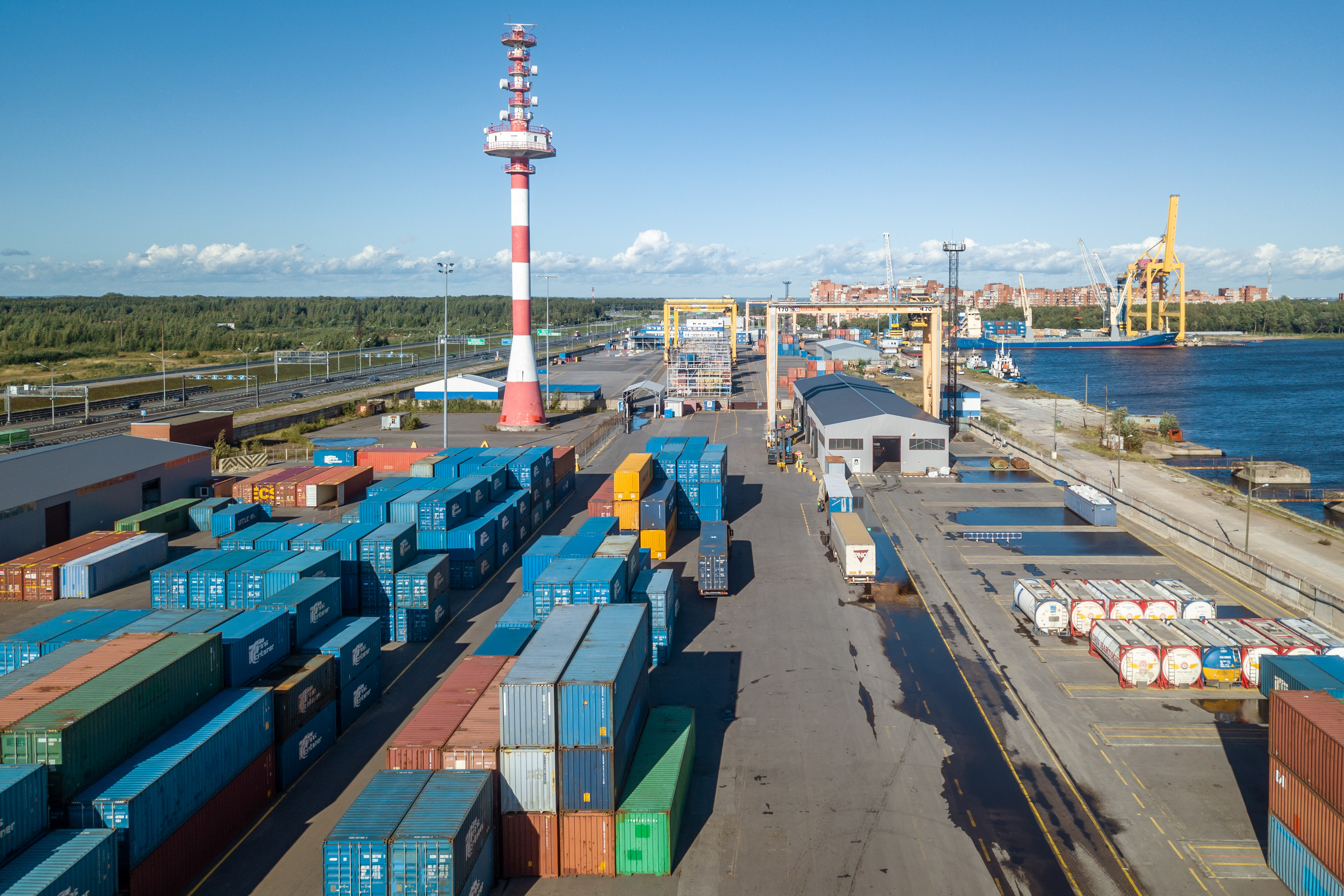
Moby Dik Terminal

Situated in Kronstadt on Kotlin Island at the harbor entrance of St. Petersburg, Moby Dik stands as a prominent marine cargo terminal. Its construction commenced in 2000, and by July 2002, Moby Dik had already successfully handled its inaugural vessel. The terminal excels in transshipping a diverse range of cargo, including containers, bulk, general, oversize, and roll-on-roll-off cargo. Importantly, it enjoys direct access to the St. Petersburg Ring Road. Its facilities include the “Litke Base, Kotlin Island” checkpoint across the state border and the “Kronstadt” customs post of the Baltic customs.

=== Yanino Logistics Park ===
Yanino Logistics Park serves as a multifaceted transport and logistics complex, often referred to as a "dry port." Its primary purpose is to enhance the warehousing capabilities of the port terminals in St. Petersburg and Kronstadt. Situated 1.5 km from the St. Petersburg Ring Road, it has rail connectivity to Petrolesport. The park's construction began in 2010, with full operational status achieved by May 2011.

=== ROLIS ===
ROLIS, established in 2004, specializes in developing IT systems tailored for Global Ports group companies and other entities within the transport industry. It evolved from the information service division of the First Container Terminal. Notably, ROLIS played a pioneering role in implementing an electronic digital signature into document flow (2009). Furthermore, it was the first to introduce electronic data exchange with the Federal Customs Service of the Russian Federation (2013). It became the first Russian terminal in Russia to offer complete electronic document flow throughout the cargo processing stages (2015). In 2020, FCT was the first terminal in the Russian Federation to switch to completely paperless processing of export and import cargo.

=== Multi-Link Terminals ===
Multi-Link Terminals Ltd Oy operates two terminals in Finland. Multi-Link Terminals was founded in 2004 as a stevedoring division of the Containerships shipping line. The terminal in the Western Port of Helsinki was the first to start operating; in 2005, the terminal in Kotka was put into operation. Multi-Link Terminals belongs to Global Ports group (50%) and CMA Terminals (50%).

In 2008, all operations from the Western Port of Helsinki were moved to the new seaport of Vuossari as part of a program to relocate cargo terminals from the historical part of the city. Terminal, among the relocated terminals, began operating in the new port.

== Ratings ==
In May 2023, the Russian rating agency Expert RA bestowed Global Ports Investments Plc with an upgraded credit rating of ruAA, accompanied by a stable outlook.
