= Liwathon E.O.S. =

Company based in Estonia

AS Liwathon E.O.S.
- Industry: Logistics
- Predecessor: AS Pakterminal; AS E.O.S.
- Founded: 24 April 2008
- Headquarters: Tallinn, Estonia
- Key people: Gert Tiivas (CEO)
- Services: Oil storage and transportation
- Revenue: €29.307 million (2020)
- Net income: €12.5 million (2020)
- Number of employees: 247 (2020)
- Subsidiaries: E.R.S. AS; Liwathon Limited; Tallinn LNG OÜ
- Website: www.liwathoneos.com

AS Liwathon E.O.S. (former name: AS Vopak E.O.S.) is an oil products terminal operator located in Tallinn, Estonia. It operates four oil terminals in the Tallinn area in Estonia.

== History ==
Liwathon E.O.S. (then Vopak E.O.S.) was created in 2008 by merger of oil terminal operators AS Pakterminal and AS E.O.S. Pakterminal was established on 30 June 1992 as a joint venture of Paktank International (later part of Vopak) and N-Terminal, a company controlled by Estonian businessmen Endel Siff, Aadu Luukas and Anatoli Kanajev. Shortly after the establishment of Pakterminal, the shareholding of N-Terminal was transferred to Trans-Kullo, another company controlled by Siff, Luukas and Kanajev. Another shareholders of Trans-Kullo were Aleksander Denisoff, Vladimir Ossavolyuk and Igor Lepetukhin—Russian businessmen related to the Russian oil industry. In 2007, Vopak acquired all shares of Pakterminal.

History of Estonian Oil Service (EOS of E.O.S.) reaches back to 1993 when the company started its operations. It was owned by Coastal Baltica Holding Company, a Cayman Islands company which was owned by Coastal Corporation and Baltica Finance N.V. In 1994, a state-owned enterprise Eesti Kütus was reorganized and a separate company Esoil was established. Esoil was privatized by and consequently merged into E.O.S. in 1996. In 2002, Coastal Baltica Holding Company sold E.O.S. to another Cayman Islands company, Estonia Holding Ltd, controlled by Baltica Finance N.V., and El Paso Corporation which acquired Coastal Corporation in 2001, exit oil business in Estonia. In 2004, Severstaltrans (later named: N-Trans) acquired a majority stake in E.O.S. through its Cyprus-based subsidiary Transportation Investments Holding Limited and later's subsidiary OÜ Intercross Investments. Severstaltrans announced its plan to merger with E.O.S. other terminal operators in Estonia like Pakterminal and Eurodek, as also Latvian Ventspils Nafta, and to list the company on the stock exchange. However, this plan with exception to the merger with Pakterminal, was never implemented.

In April 2008, Vopak and N-Trans merged their businesses in Estonia to create Vopak E.O.S. Originally, N-Trans owned 65% of share and Vopak owned 35% of shares. In July 2008, Vopak used the option to acquire additional 15% of shares from N-Trans and Vopak E.O.S. became equally owned by these companies. Later that year, N-Trans transferred its stake to its that time subsidiary Global Ports Investments. Later, major shareholders in Global Ports Investments became Russian Delo Group and APM Terminals, a part of Maersk Group.

In 2018, owners of Vopak E.O.S. announced their plan to sell the company. In April 2019, Vopak E.O.S. was acquired by the Guernsey investment company Liwathon, owned by the British investor Barclay Rowland based in Guernsey. Pruul, Kristjan (2019-04-03). "Skandaalne perekond sisenes Eestis transiidiärisse". Äripäev (in Estonian). The company was consequently renamed Liwathon E.O.S. In June 2019, Gert Tiivas became a new CEO of the company.

== Operations ==
Liwathon E.O.S. operates four oil terminals in the Tallinn area in Estonia with a capacity of 1,051,800 cubic metres (37,140,000 cu ft). It also provides oil transport services through its railway logistics subsidiary E.R.S. AS (Estonian Railway Services). In 2020, it made a profit of €12.5 million. In 2020, it employed 220 people.

Liwathon E.O.S. or its predecessor companies were according to the Äripäev TOP 100 list the most successful Estonian companies in 1999, 2006, 2007, and 2010.
