= NUTEP =

NUTEP container terminal
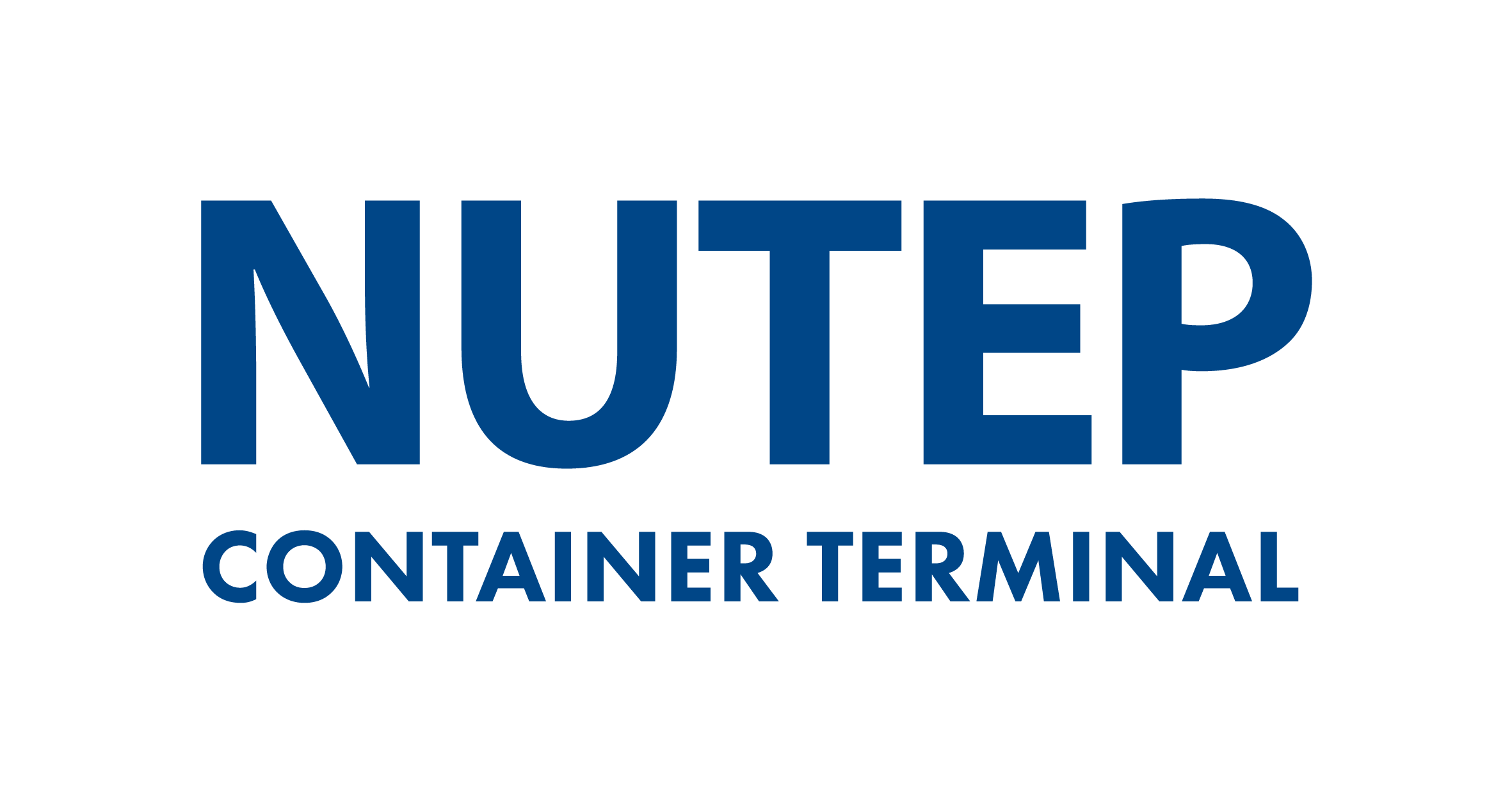

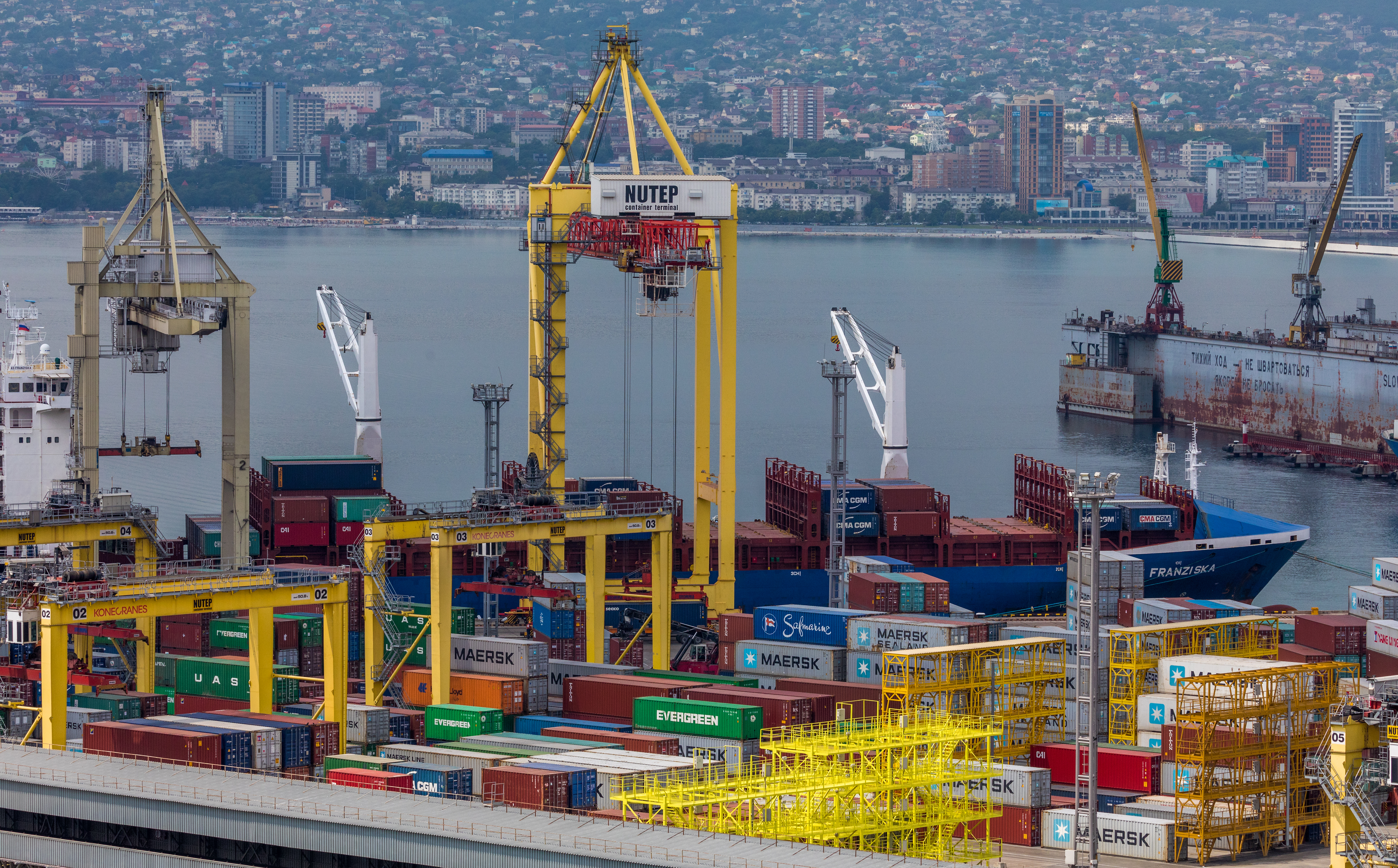
- Native name: Контейнерный терминал НУТЭП
- Formerly: Novorossiysk transport-expediting hub
- Industry: stevedore services
- Founded: 2002
- Headquarters: Novorossiysk, Sukhumi highway, 17А
- Parent: DeloPorts
- Website: http://www.nutep.ru/en/

NUTEP container terminal is a container terminal at the Novorossiysk Sea Port for ro/ro, container and general cargo. It was built in 2002—2004 as a subsidiary of Russian stevedoring holding DeloPorts.

== History ==
The container terminal was constructed and put into operation between 2002—2004 on the premises of NUTEP (Novorossiysk freight forwarder, lit. ‘Novorossiyskoe Uzlovoe Transportno-Expeditsionnoe Predpriyatie’) in the Port of Novorossiysk (NSP) under the management of National Container Company (NCC).

In 2010 Sergey Shishkarev's Delo Group has acquired half of the NUTEP shares.

In 2011 NCC sold their half of the NUTEP shares to Delo Group for 115 million roubles.

At that moment NUTEP was the only terminal in NSP, which was not a subsidiary of Novorossiysk Commercial Sea Port (NCSP). In 2015 NUTEP and other stevedore assets of Delo in Novorossiysk (KSK grain terminal and TOS bunkering company) merged into united holding DeloPorts.

== Infrastructure and Facilities ==
NUTEP is the most modern terminal in the port of Novorossiysk. It covers 34 hectares and has its own railway park with 6 reception and departure sidings and possibility to create block-trains, as well as harbor railways and direct access to the major federal highway М4 ‘Don’. It can receive and dispatch containers via sea, railroad or on trucks, and serve vessels such as Panamax and Post-Panamax.

NUTEP has been constructed and developed in several steps:

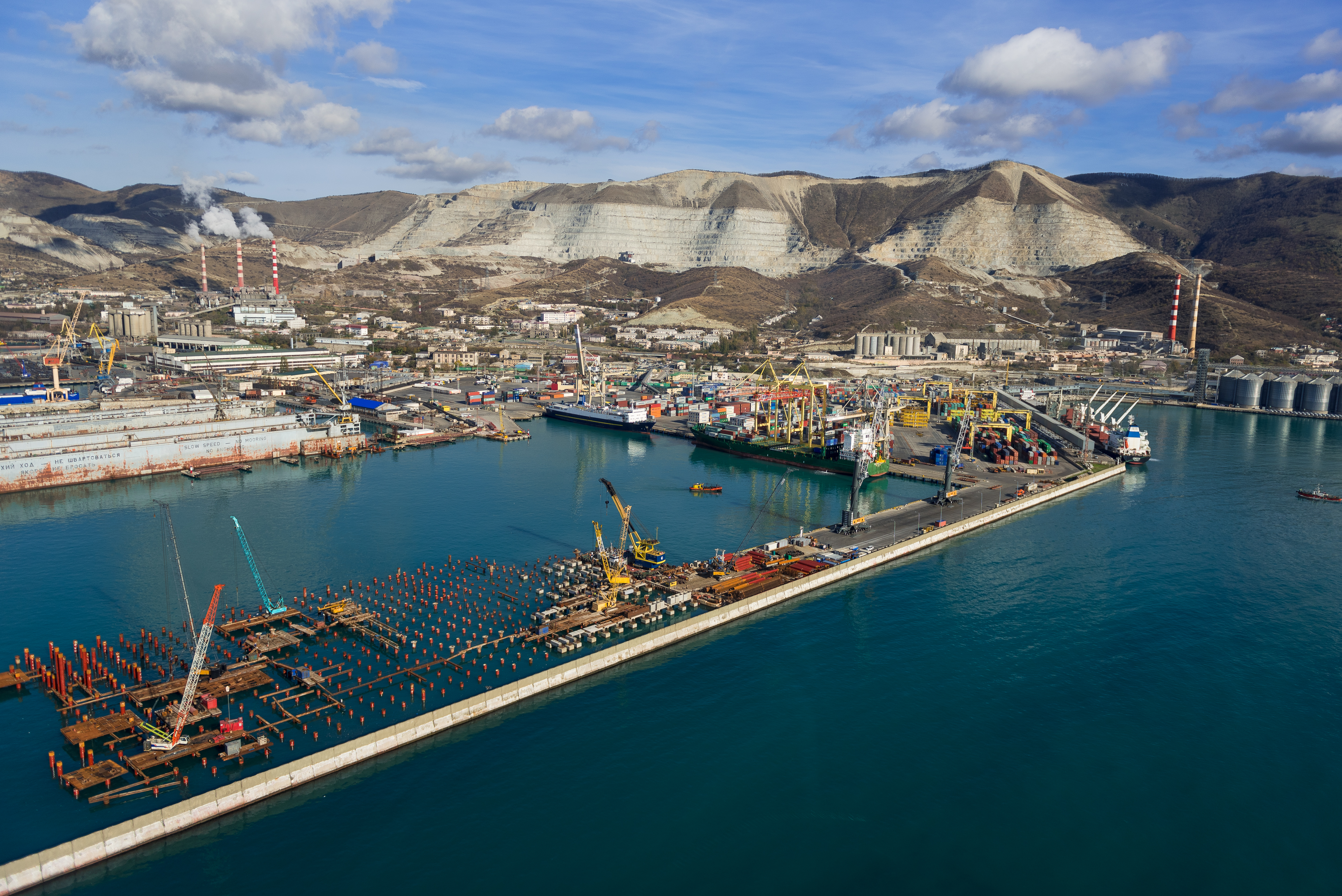
Construction of deepwater pier number 38

- From 2005 to 2006 a 2712 m long railway line was built to handle container trains on the platform at the dock № 39. 435 m route miles gave the capacity to handle 22 flatcars, allowing NUTEP to receive and transfer railway cargo without the third-party services.

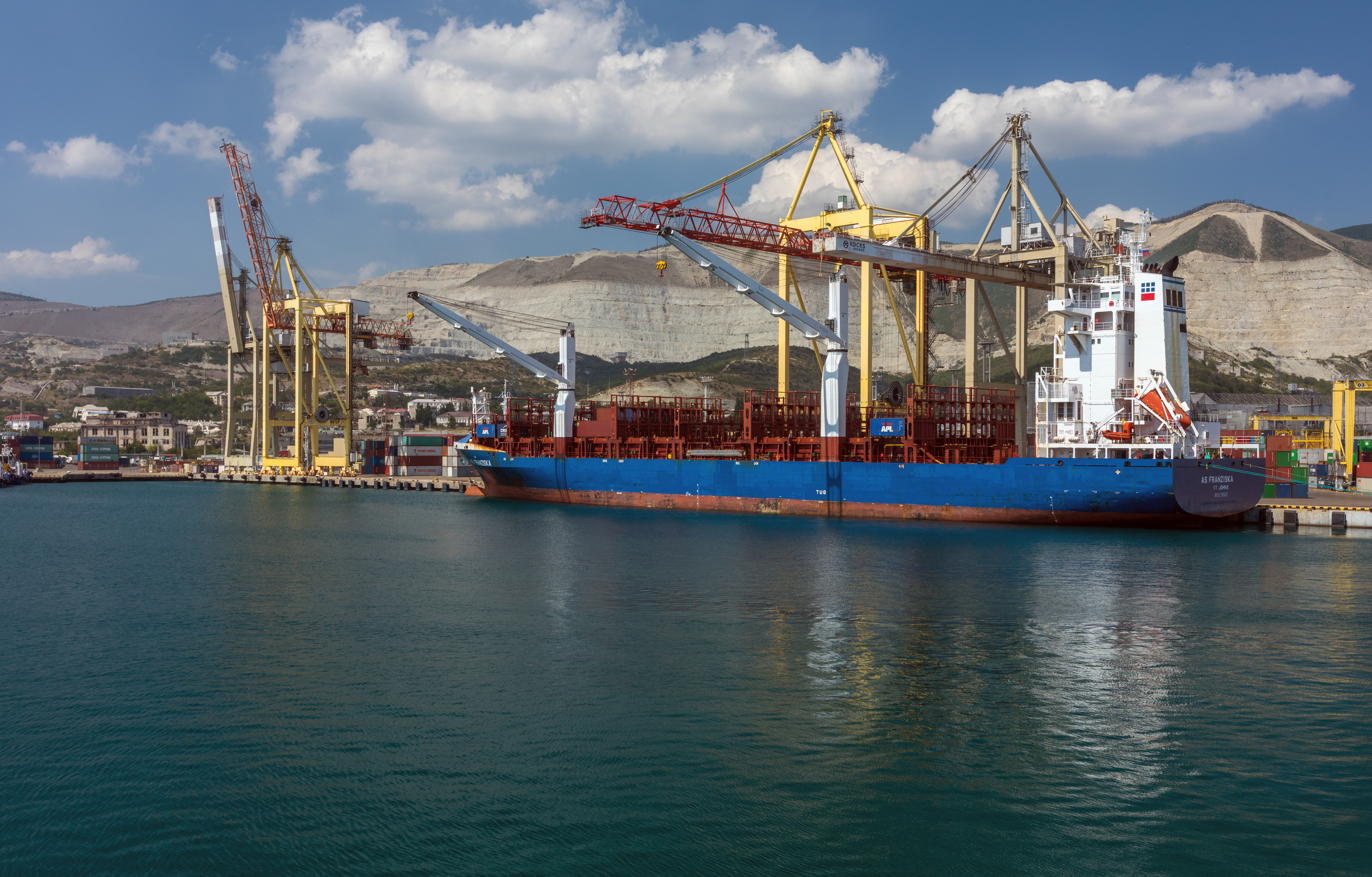
NUTEP ship-to-shore crane

- In 2009 the first in Russia ship-to-shore crane (STS) by Liebherr and 4 rubber tyred gantry cranes (RTG) by Konecranes were put in service at NUTEP. The design-built STS was adapted to the special wind and seismic loadings in the Novorossiysk aquatic area, it featured 50 ton spreader capacity, 46 m outreach and a discharge capability up to 45 moves per hour. The RTGs were scaled to bear 50 ton loading with an average stack height 5+1 and stack width 7+1 container, resp. The new equipment scaled NUTEP capacity to 215,000 TEU per year.
- In 2019 deepwater pier №38, 15m deep and 390m long, began operating at NUTEP, being able to receive container ships up to 10 000 TEUs in capacity (formerly the terminal handled only the vessels up to 4,000 TEU because it was just 2,3m deep). The territory size is 4 hectares. The pier is equipped with 3 rail-tracked STS cranes by ZPMC and 4 RTGs. Throughput capacity NUTEP will be increased up to 700,000 TEU per year after the investment program is over in 2021. From 2015 the total investment is 125 million dollars.

== Cargo Turnover ==
NUTEP handles following container lines: Maersk Line, COSCO, Evergreen Group, Seago Line, Yang Ming Marine Transport Corporation, Admiral, Arkas Line, Mediterranean Shipping Company, CMA CGM, and Norasia. According to the data for 2016, 40% of transactions were performed with Maersk.

As of 2019, NUTEP is the leader in cargo transfer in Novorossiysk (its share is 48,8%) and Azov and Black Sea basin (its share is 48,1%). Its share on the Russian market is 7,1%.

Year	2004	2005	2006	2007	2008	2009	2010	2011	2012	2013	2014	2015	2016	2017	2018	2019
Cargo turnover, 1000 TEU	32.8	54.3	99.1	141.4	n/a	120.7	124.6	199.3	215	n/a	n/a	202.6	233	304	333	375

== Financials ==
In 2018 NUTEP annual revenue reached 4,058 million roubles, EBITDA — 2.990 million, total revenue in 2019 was 4,932 million. ‘DeloPorts’ total consolidated revenue for 2018 was 11.9 billion roubles (up 35,6% from 2017), while total EBITDA reached 8.781 billion (up 44,4% from 2017).
