= National Container Company =

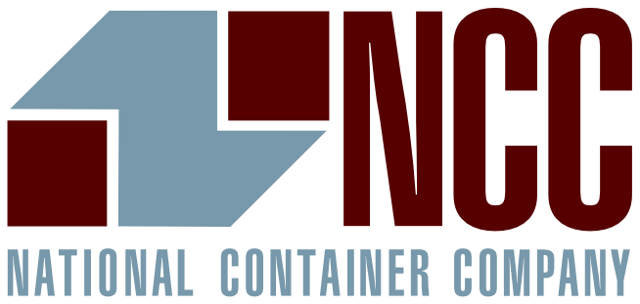
- Native name: Russian: Национальная контейнерная компания (НКК)
- Founded: 2002
- Headquarters: Russia
- Services: container handling services
- Website: www.container.ru/en/

National Container Company (NCC, Russian: Национальная контейнерная компания) was one of the biggest container operators in Russia and the CIS countries in the 2000s. The company was founded in 2002. Its container terminals were mainly based in the Baltic Sea. In 2012, the total capacity of the company’s maritime container ports was nearly 1.069 million TEUs. In 2013, NCC was acquired by Global Ports.

== History ==
Severstaltrans and First Quantum Group created National Container Company in 2002. First Quantum Group was one of the JSC Sea Port of Saint-Petersburg shareholders, while Severstaltrans would later develop into the N-Trans holding company. The company worked on a few projects: the Ust-Luga terminal, founded jointly with the German company Eurogate, and the NUTEP container terminal, developed together with the Delo Group in Novorossiysk.

In 2006, the partners divided NCC. Severstaltrans got a stake in the Far Eastern container terminals: Vladivostok’s Container Terminal (a joint venture with the Commercial Port of Vladivostok) and the East Stevedore Company LLC (another shareholder was Dubai Port World). First Quantum got NCC’s assets located in the north-west and the south: the First Container Terminal and the Baltic Container Terminal (the modern Ust-Luga container terminal). It also got a stake in the NUTEP container terminal in Novorossiysk and Caspian Container Terminal in Port Olya. Another NCC shareholder appeared in 2006: FESCO Transportation Group got a 50% stake.

The construction of an inland container terminal and logistics complex in Shushary (” Logisitka-Terminal”) began in 2007. The complex started operating two years later. It’s there that the dry port concept was used in Russia for the first time in 2011. This concept implies that an inland terminal is directly connected to a seaport.

In 2010, FESCO withdrew capital from NCC amidst a long conflict around FESCO’s refusal to fund the Ust-Luga terminal’s development. The other shareholder bought FESCO’s stake.

In December 2011, the first phase of the Ust-Luga container terminal was put into operation in the Ust-Luga port. Unifeeder company made the first ship entry.

In 2011, the Delo Group bought NCC’s stake in NUTEP.

National Container Company was the biggest container port operator in Russia in 2012, operating five container terminals:

- the First Container Terminal (Saint-Petersburg)
- the Ust-Luga Container terminal (Leningrad oblast)
- Logistika-Terminal (Shushary, Saint-Petersburg)
- Illichevsk Container Terminal (Odesa Oblast, Ukraine)
- the National Container terminal (Riga, Latvia)

The group also controlled two container operators: NCC Logistika (railroad operator) and Baltcontainer (motor transport operator). In 2012, the total capacity of NCC’s maritime container ports was nearly 1.069 million TEUs. In the first six months of 2013, NCC’s maritime terminals transshipped 561 thousand TEUs, 7% more than the year-ago value. In 2012, the company’s consolidated revenue was $253.3 million, while the EBITDA value amounted to $164 million.

Global Ports bought NCC in 2013 and thus acquired a 100% stake in the First Container Terminal, an 80% stake in the Ust-Luga Container terminal, and a 100% stake in Logistika-Terminal. NCC got $291 million in cash and 18% of Global Ports’ stock. The stakes of Global Ports’ main shareholders — TIHL and APM Terminals B.V. — thus dropped from 37.5 % to 30.75 % (TIHL represented N-Trans’ interests, and APM Terminals B.V. was A.P. Møller — Mærsk's terminal subdivision). The free float stock fell from 25 % to 20.5 %. NCC shareholders— Andrey Kobzar and First Quantum — got a 9 % stake each in Global Ports’ capital.

Following the deal’s completion, the merged company covered 82% of Saint-Petersburg’s container business market, 79% in the north-west from Murmansk to Kaliningrad, and nearly 39% in the whole of Russia.
