= Ruscon =

Transport company

- Native name: Рускон
- Company type: private company
- Parent: Delo Group

Ruscon is a Russian transportation and forwarding company, multimodal integrator within Delo Group. The company encompasses cargo transportation and logistics to various regions of Russia via key ports in Vladivostok, Novorossiysk, Nakhodka, St. Petersburg, and critical land border crossings. Notably, Ruscon has its own transport and terminal assets, with 6 terminals positioned across key Russian ports and regions. Has representative offices in Kazakhstan, China and the Netherlands.

== History ==
Ruscon, an enterprise in the freight forwarding realm, saw its inception in 2002 in Novorossiysk. It emerged as a specialized freight forwarding company, with the Delo Group wisely segregating the forwarding, warehouse processing, and multimodal transportation of cargo in containers into a distinct segment.

In 2002, the company launched the first container train Novorossiysk – Moscow, and in the same year it began offering agency services for transporting cargo through the Great Port of Saint Petersburg.

In 2003, Ruscon invested in the development of marine terminals in the south of Russia by acquiring the Ruscon-1 Terminal in Novorossiysk, the capacity of which at the time of acquisition was 15 thousand TEUs per year. In 2004, the company was the first in Russia to transport grain shipments in containers for export, and in the same year it implemented a project to introduce a reach stacker container processing technology in its Novorossiysk terminal.

In 2006, Ruscon acquired well car, a truck fleet and became a railway rolling stock operator. In 2007, the company's assets were replenished by the MANP ground terminal in the Moscow Oblast with a capacity of 20 thousand TEUs. In 2008–2009, Ruscon acquired the Ruscon-2 and Ruscon-3 Terminals in Novorossiysk, their capacity at the time of acquisition was 5 thousand and 10 thousand TEUs per year, respectively.

In 2014, the company built a system of regular cargo transportation using its own fleet of container trains between the Vostochny Port (Nakhodka) and the container terminal in the Moscow region. In 2017, the company acquired the warehouse operator SLG-Operating, one of the leaders in the Russian warehouse logistics market. In 2018, Ruscon launched the fourth terminal in Novorossiysk (“Ruscon-4”) with a capacity of 30 thousand TEUs per year. In 2021, Ruscon began construction of its own terminal with a capacity of 30 thousand TEUs per year at the Orlovka railway station near Volgograd, the terminal was out into operation in August 2023.

As of yearend 2022, Ruscon had steered the volume of forwarded cargo to a commendable 307.4 thousand TEUs.

In 2023, the company increased the number of voyages between the Novorossiysk port and the Indian ports of Mundra and Nava Sheva fourfold, including the ports of Istanbul (Turkey) and Jeddah (Saudi Arabia) as intermediate route points/ It also launched a sea container service between Istanbul and the terminal in St. Petersburg.

== Assets ==
As of mid-2023, Ruscon's assets include 6 ground terminals, 12 regional offices, 3 offices abroad. The capacity of the company's container fleet is 6 thousand TEU.

== Social activities ==
Since 2019, Ruscon has lent its support as a sponsor to the CSKA women's handball club. In November 2022, the proudly assumed the title sponsorship of the FC Chernomorets.
