= KSK (grain terminal) =

Russian container terminal

KSK grain terminal
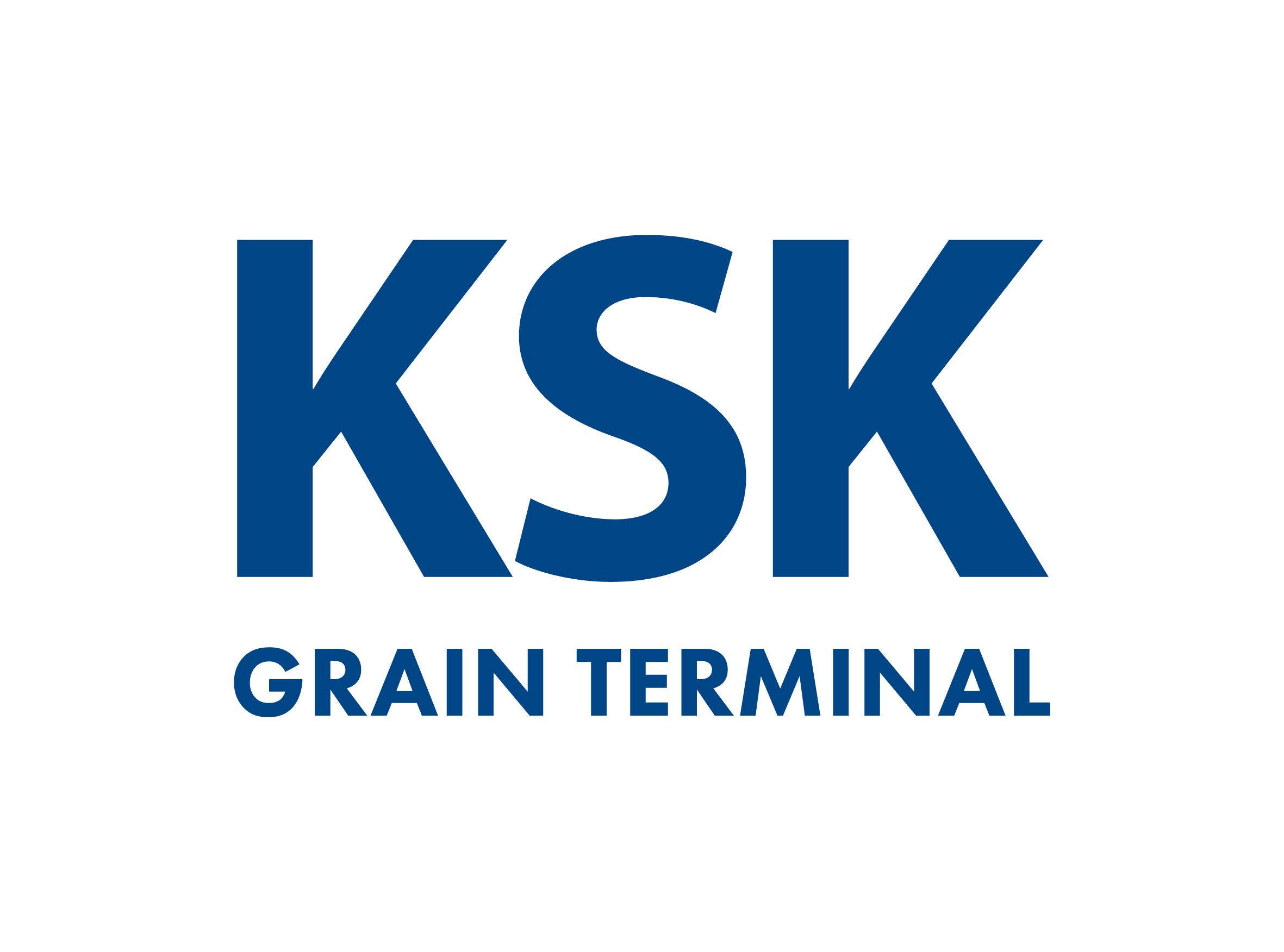

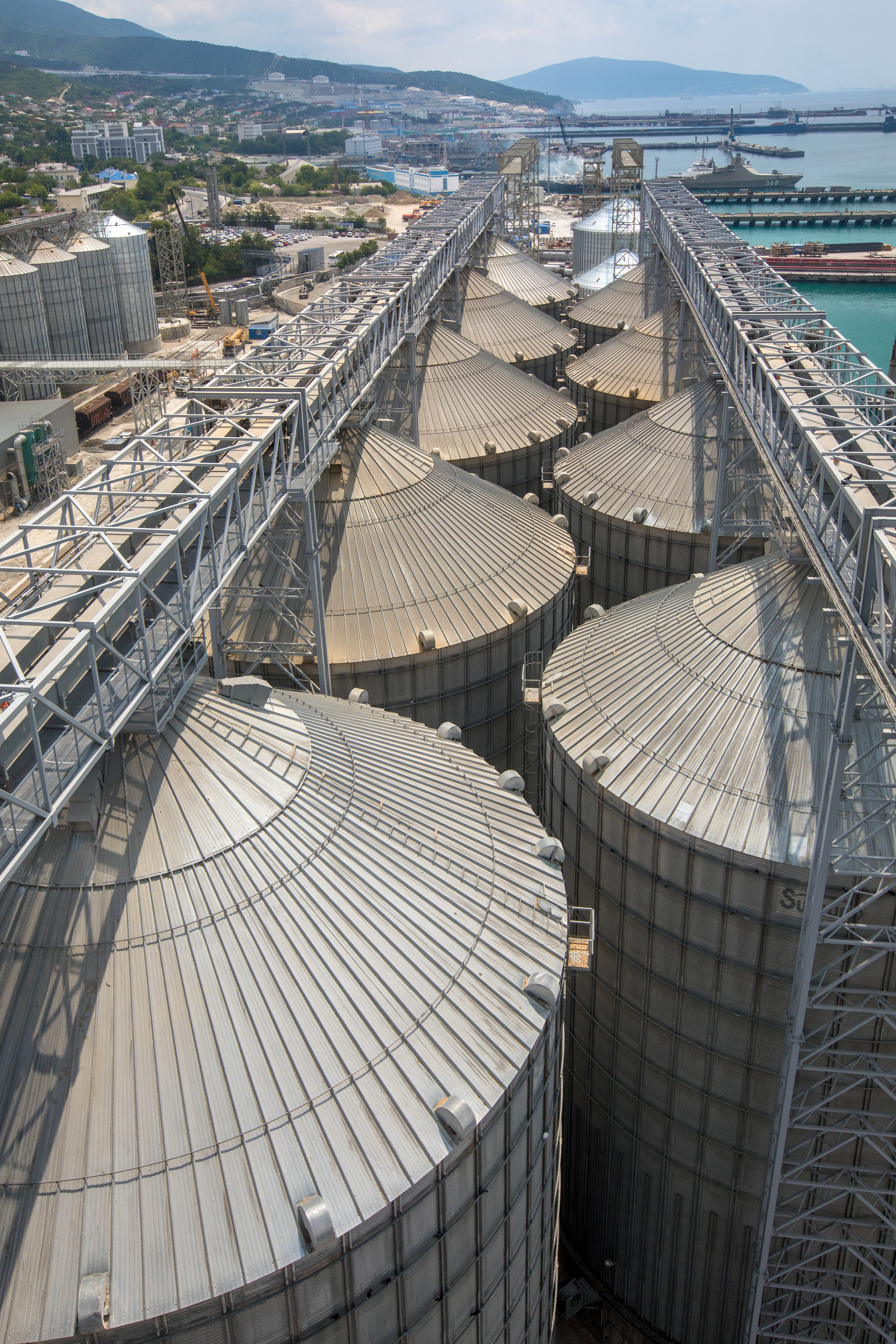
- grain silos
- Formerly: Kombinat “Stroikomplekt”
- Industry: stevedore services
- Founded: 2006
- Headquarters: Novorossiysk, Sukhumi highway, 21
- Parent: DeloPorts
- Website: http://www.gt-ksk.com/en/

KSK grain terminal is a container terminal of Novorossiysk Sea Port for grain, ro/ro and general cargo. It was launched in 2006 as a subsidiary of Russian stevedoring holding DeloPorts.

== History ==
The terminal “Kombinat Stroikomplekt” (since April 2014 known as KSK) was launched in 2006. It occupied 7 hectares of same name enterprise: a former “Stroydetal” factory of “Novorossiyskmorstroy”, managed by the Mintransstroy (the USSR Department of Transport Construction). The facility was equipped with sheltered warehouses, parking lots and four III-class berths.

The proprietary (Delo Group) initiated a reconstruction in 2007. The project included the construction of a new terminal elevator of 120,000 tons capacity, a new rail line and a berth for handling vessels up to 30,000 ton. The required investments of 1.5 billion roubles were credited by Sberbank. The first stage of the project was finished in 2012, expanding the terminal capacity up to 2 million tons of grain per year, upon completion of the second stage it grew to 3.5 million tons.

In 2012 KSK grain terminal, among other stevedore assets, was consolidated into the “DeloPorts” holding.

In September 2013 the biggest automotive logistics complex in the Russian Black Sea basin was opened at the KSK. With a modern custom ro/ro berth and storage facilities for 733 cars at a time, it is capable of handling 50,000 cars per year.

In 2018-2019 the construction of additional silos (102,000 tons in volume) was completed, as well as additional line of grain receivers from trains and trucks. Their own certified laboratory for grain quality control was expanded. The processing speed increased from 400 to 600 cars a day, the railroad infrastructure allows it to handle up to 150 cars a day (previously up to 100). In the beginning of 2020, the coastal part of the grain terminal reconstruction started. KSK territory expanded to 12,4 hectares, two deep sea terminals from 11,2 to 12,4m, silos 220,000 tons in volume, 3 truck-receiving lines and 3 train-receiving lines with two cars each. Overall throughput capacity is estimated to be 5,5 million tons.

The dock No.40a is being constructed. It is going to be 16,9m deep, which will allow KSK receive type Post Panamax vessels (deadweight 100,000 tons) and expand destinations into Southeast Asia. After the construction (estimated worth 3,7 billion roubles) is complete, KSK capacity should increase from 5,5 to 6,5 mln tons.

As of the beginning of 2020, the total area size was 12,4 hectares; KSK handles transloading on 6 docks, 4 of which are company-owned and 2 are under long-term rent. Terminal's technical capabilities allow it to receive vessels like Supramax and Panamax (deadweight up to 55,000 tons). The KSK grain terminal has a direct access to state highway M4 “Don”state highway M4 “Don”.

== Cargo Turnover ==
According to the company, in 2019 KSK's share in seaports are: 30,4% in Novorossiysk, 11,7% in Azov and Black Sea basin, 22,6% among deep sea ports. The biggest clients include Cargill and agroholding “Step’”. Main delivery destinations are Persian Gulf countries, African and Latin American countries.

Year	2015	2016	2017	2018	2019
Grain throughput, mln ton	3	3.3	4.21	4.79	3,6

== Proprietors and Management ==
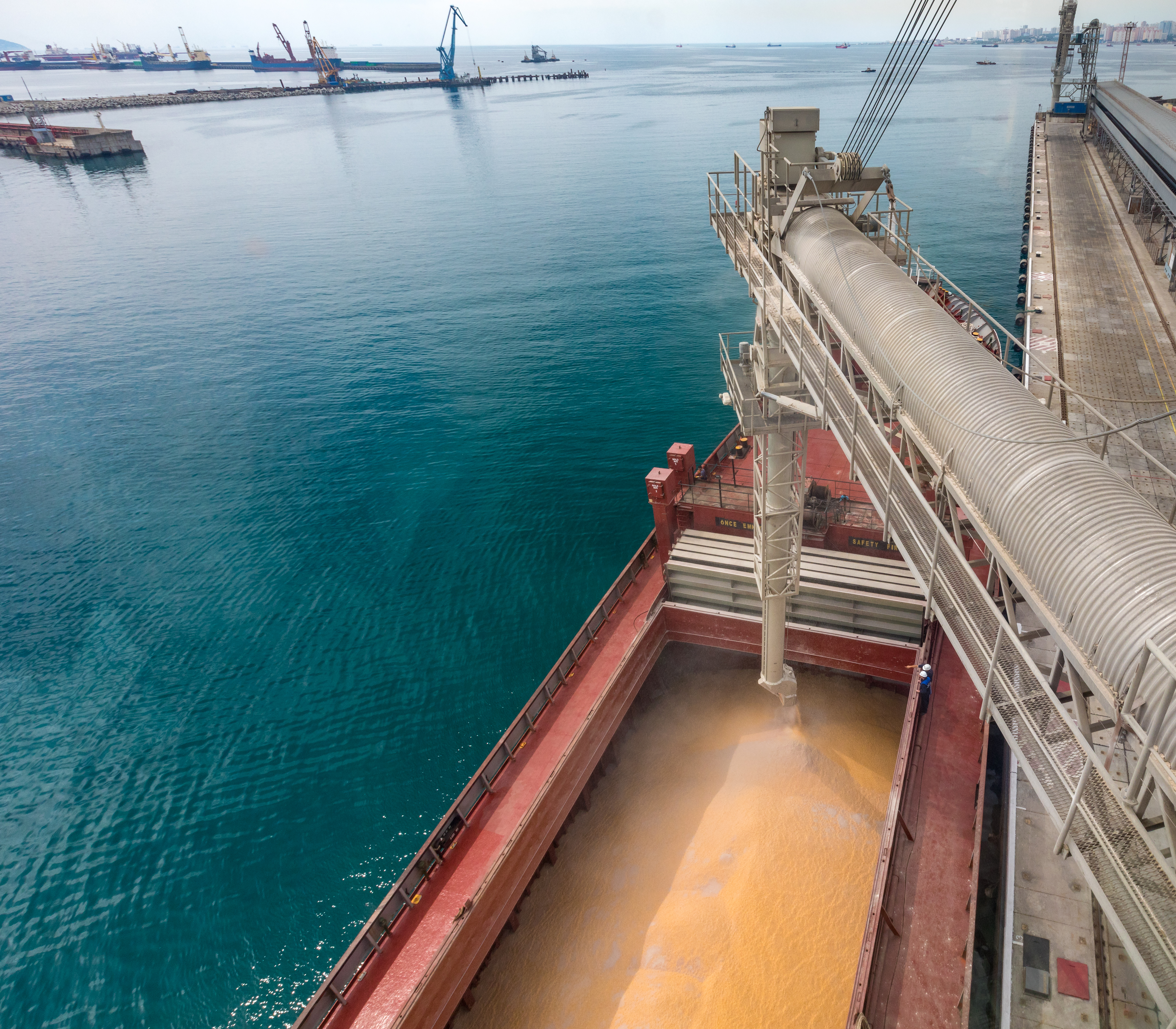
Grain Shipment

Up to 2013 Delo Group was the only owner of KSK grain terminal, having other stevedore Novorossiysk assets merged into the “DeloPorts” holding. In the end of 2013 Delo sold 25% + 1 share of KSK to Cargill (an American food company, one of the KSK key clients), which accounted for 20% of the terminal's revenue. As a result, Cargill acquired the blocking share holding and one of five seats in the KSK executive board. The general manager of the grain terminal is Alexander Trukhanovich.

== Financials ==
In 2018 the company's estimated revenue was 6,024 million roubles, while EBITDA reached 5,392 million. The 2019 revenue was 3,371 million roubles, EBITDA — 2,883 million.
