= Port of St. Petersburg, Florida =

Port of St. Petersburg
- Interactive map of Port of St. Petersburg
- Location within the United States

Location
- Country: United States
- Location: St. Petersburg, Florida
- Coordinates: 27.76247°N 82.62959°W
- UN/LOCODE: USPIE

Details
- Opened: 1925
- Operated by: Port Director
- Owned by: City of St. Petersburg
- Size: appx. 4 acres
- No. of berths: 1
- Employees: ~11
- Channel depth: 23 feet

Statistics
- Annual revenue: US $58,000 (FY 2013)
- Website; Port of St. Petersburg Archived September 28, 2015, at the Wayback Machine

The Port of St. Petersburg is a port located near downtown St. Petersburg, Florida. The Port of St. Petersburg is used by the U.S. Coast Guard under Sector St. Petersburg and serves a super yacht facility.

== History ==
The Port of St. Petersburg opened in 1925 in anticipation of becoming a major shipping port. In the beginning, the port was used mainly for the use of the U.S. Coast Guard from 1927 up until it was abandoned in 1933, although the base was reopened in 1939 due to World War II. Following World War II, the port was used as a dry dock for ships. In 1977, the interest for turning the St. Petersburg port into a cruise port was rumored among the city. However, shortly after problems arose when the depth of the port was revealed to be shallower than most ports such as the Port Tampa Bay and Port of Miami the city attempted regardless to get a cruise line tenant. In 1987 the city finally got a cruise line by the name of Scandinavian World Cruises that offered their ship the Scandinavian Star to the port where it stayed until 1991. Following in 1993, another cruise line from Ukraine took up the spot, however like the Scandinavian cruise before the Ukraine cruise liner didn't stay extensively. Since the absence of a cruise liner, the Port of St. Petersburg has been struggling to get commercial usage.

== Future port plans ==
Although the port's commercial use has been declining throughout the years, dreams of the port expanding its use for cruise ships, yacht repairs, markets, a marine research hub, and a relocation port has been suggested by members of St. Petersburg government and port owners.

=== Downtown Waterfront Master Plan ===
The Port of St. Petersburg is a part of the Bayboro District in the cities Downtown Waterfront Master Plan. The plan for the district is to add pedestrian areas, more park spaces around the district, and development sits for future use. The plan for the port also calls for deeper water wharves, pier structures, and new peninsulas such as Port Discovery.

==== Port Discovery ====
The port also has been working on a partnership with the St. Pete Ocean Team to carry out a plan called "Port Discovery" for marine education, research, and science on the St. Pete Port. The "Port Discovery" plan would allow the Port Terminal Building to be open for the public and would mainly focus on local schools visits.
