= ACRA (rating agency) =

Credit rating agency of Russia

Analytical Credit Rating Agency
- Industry: Financial services
- Founded: 2015
- Headquarters: Moscow, Russia
- Key people: Yekaterina Trofimova (CEO)
- Website: acra-ratings.com

ACRA (Analytical Credit Rating Agency; Russian: Аналитическое Кредитное Рейтинговое Агентство - АКРА) is a rating agency based in Moscow, Russia. It was established in 2015, with Yekaterina Trofimova as its CEO.

Due to the withdrawal of US-based rating agencies because of Russian legislative changes and sanctions against Russia, ACRA was expected by analysts to become Russia's main ratings issuer.

ACRA is deemed too demanding by a number of Russian companies, and is compared unfavorably to its competitor Expert RA, which is seen as putting its customers first. In January 2017, VTB Bank refused to disclose the rating it received from ACRA, just noting that it was even lower than the 'politicized' rating assigned by Western agencies. By July 2017 the agency had issued over 40 ratings.

ACRA is engaged in research and forecasting and has developed ACRA Financial Stress Index (ACRA FSI), which is used to evaluate the possibility of a financial crisis in Russia and Kazakhstan.

The agency was accused of benefiting from state favoritism by Expert RA, a local competitor.

Partnering with CSCI Pengyuan

In 2024, ACRA signed a MoU with a Chinese credit rating agency CSCI Pengyuan to facilitate the entry of issuers to the markets of China and Russia, exchange information on rating methodologies in order to harmonize them, and perform joint analytical research. As a former internal organ of People's Bank of China, the Chinese central bank, CSCI Pengyuan is generally viewed as being closely tied to the Chinese government.
