= Delo Group =

Transportation and logistics holding company

Delo» Group of Companies
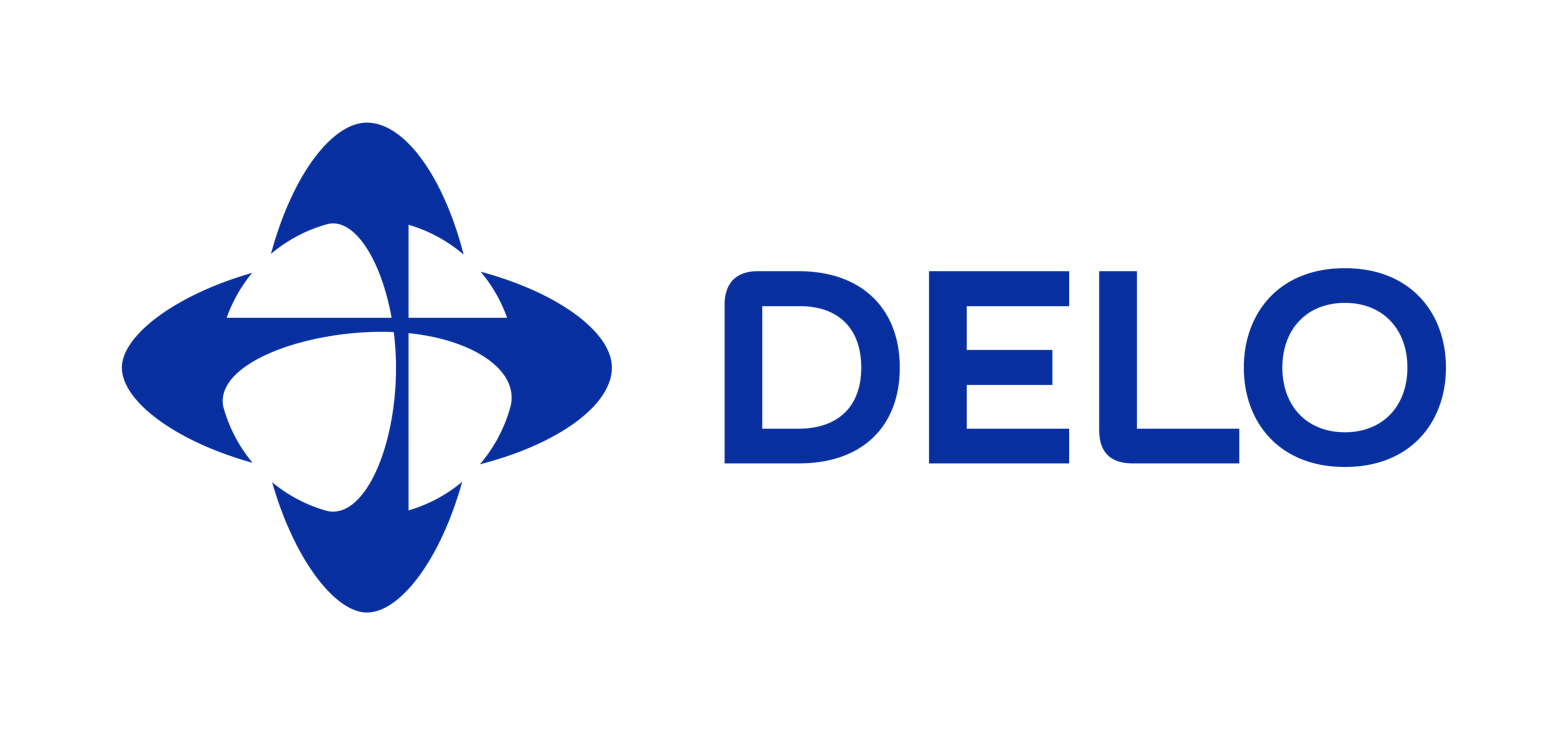
- Native name: «Delo» Group of Companies
- Company type: Logistics
- Founded: 1993
- Founders: Sergey Shishkarev
- Key people: Sergey Shishkarev (Chairman of the Board of Directors)
- Subsidiaries: DeloPorts (NUTEP, KSK, Delo service operator), Global Ports, TransContainer, Ruscon, DeloTech.
- Website: http://delo-group.com/

"Delo" Group of Companies is the most extensive transport and logistics holding in Russia. It operates maritime container and deep-water grain terminals in the Sea of Azov and Black Sea, Baltic and Far Eastern basins. Additionally, it has a network of railway container terminals and a fleet of containers and well cars. The leading company of the Group is LLC UK Delo.

The stevedoring business consists of DeloPorts and Global Ports. The transport and logistics branch includes the multimodal service integrator Ruscon and the railway container operator TransContainer. One of the most significant shipping companies in Russia. The strategic IT integrator of the Delo Group is the company DeloTech.

== History ==
Founded by Sergey Shishkarev in 1993, the Delo Group began as a freight forwarding company in Novorossiysk. It quickly became the leading private operator of the Port of Novorossiysk, providing over half of all freight forwarding services.

Since 2002, the Delo Group has invested its own funds to build the NUTEP container terminal in the Southeastern cargo district of the Novorossiysk port. In 2004, the terminal was launched and successfully handled its first container ship. In 2019, the Delo Group commissioned a remarkable deep-water berth, No. 38, within the NUTEP terminal. This berth has the capacity to accommodate ocean container ships up to 10,000 TEU. Later the terminal's overall capacity was increased to an impressive 700,000 TEU.

In 2007, Delo Group of Companies made an acquisition of StroyKomplekt integrated plant, which is located adjacent to NUTEP, with the purpose of constructing a state-of-the-art grain terminal known as CJSC Grain Terminal KSK. The first stage of the KSK grain terminal was launched in 2012, boasting a capacity of 2 million tons of grain annually. Subsequently, in 2013, the second stage of the terminal was put into operation, resulting in an increased capacity of 3.5 million tons per year. Notably, in 2021, the grain terminal of KSK JSC welcomed the inauguration of a deep-water grain berth, specifically Berth No. 40A, which enabled the terminal to handle ships with a deadweight of 100,000 tons. As a result, the terminal's throughput capacity now stands at an impressive 6 million tons.

Furthermore, in 2016, Delo Management Company (MC Delo LLC) was established to further strengthen and streamline the company's operations.

In 2018, Delo Group acquired a notable 30.75% stake in Global Ports, which happens to be the largest container terminal operator in Russia. Finally, in 2022, Delo Group further expanded its presence in Global Ports by purchasing an additional 30.75% stake from Maersk, thereby increasing its overall stake in the company to an impressive 61.5%.

In 2019, the Delo Group emerged victorious in an auction for the acquisition of 50% plus two shares of PJSC TransContainer, and in 2020 it consolidated 100% of the company's shares.

In 2022, the Delo Group acquires a 58.67% stake in one of Russia's largest shipping companies, the Sakhalin Shipping Company, which doubles the passage of container trains with imports on the border between Russia and China.

DeloTech, a strategic IT integrator of the Delo Group, was established in 2022. In 2023, the Delo Group consolidated its IT assets based on DeloTech, with the strategic goal of increasing the Group's expertise in the digitalisation of container logistics and realising the potential of assets using information technology.

== Assets ==
=== Stevedoring ===
==== DeloPorts ====
The asset structure of DeloPorts includes the NUTEP container terminal, the KSK grain terminal and the Delo Service Company.

The NUTEP container terminal, with a capacity of 700,000 TEU, is capable of handling ocean-class vessels up to 10,000 TEU.

The KSK grain terminal is the leading grain transhipment terminal in the Azov-Black Sea basin with a 30% market share. It was commissioned in 2006. It is located in the South-Eastern area of the seaport of Novorossiysk. In addition to bulk cargo, the terminal handles general and Ro-Ro cargo. The terminal's capacity is 8 million tons per year.

Delo Service Company provides towing services using modern tugs with exceptional manoeuvring capabilities and a fleet of six ASD Tug 2310 tugs. SC Delo also offers agency and bunkering services in the Novorossiysk port.

==== Global Ports ====
The structure of Global Ports. The leader in terms of container transhipment in Russian sea terminals includes the First Container Terminal, Petrolesport and the Moby Dik terminal in the Great Port of Saint Petersburg, the Ust-Luga Container Terminal in the Ust-Luga Multimodal Complex, Vostochnaya Stevedoring Company in the Vostochny Port in the Far East, the Yanino Logistics Park inland container terminal near St. Petersburg and MLT-Helsinki and MLT-Kotka container terminals in Finnish Helsinki and Kotka.

The share of Global Ports terminals in Russia's container turnover in 2022 was 23%. The total capacity of sea container terminals is 3.2 million TEU per year. The consolidated transhipment of containers by the company's sea terminals in 2022 amounted to 992 thousand TEU, the turnover of bulk cargo - 3.6 million tons.

=== Transport logistics ===
==== TransContainer ====
PJSC TransContainer is the leading company in container rail logistics in Eurasia and offers a comprehensive range of transport and logistics services in collaboration with Delo Group of Companies. The company handles approximately 50% of container transportation in the Russian Federation and operates 40 terminals across Russia, as well as 94 sales offices. The container fleet has a capacity of 220,000 TEU, while the well cars fleet consists of 40,000 units.

==== Ruscon ====
Ruscon serves as a multimodal integrator for Delo Group. It provides tailored solutions for delivering goods to various regions of Russia through the ports of Novorossiysk, St. Petersburg, Nakhodka, Vladivostok, and land border crossings. The company owns 6 ground terminals, 12 regional offices, and 3 international offices.

== Sponsorship and Corporate Social Responsibility ==
Delo Group is engaged in charitable and sponsorship activities in key regions of operation, such as the Krasnodar Krai, the Far East, Moscow, St. Petersburg, and others.

Delo Group contributed to funding a monument dedicated to port workers in Novorossiysk. The monument stands on the Admiral Serebryakov embankment, near the port area. Its unveiling coincided with the city's 180th anniversary, the 75th anniversary of its liberation during the Great Patriotic War, and the 45th anniversary of being recognised as a Hero City.

In September 2022, with the Group's support, a stadium and an entrance stele monument featuring the White-naped crane, the symbol of Zabaikalsk, were inaugurated in the city. City of Zabaikalsk is home to the largest container terminal on the Russia-China border.

=== Sport ===
Since 2015, Delo Group has been a proud sponsor of the Russian Handball Federation, providing support for the growth and development of handball in various regions of Russia. The Group's subsidiaries proudly sponsor esteemed handball clubs such as HBC CSKA Moscow, HC Kuban Krasnodar, HC Chernomorochka, and HC Zilant.

In a promising announcement for 2023, Sergey Shishkarev revealed that as part of their ongoing commitment to the HC Chernomorochka in Novorossiysk, Delo Group has plans to construct a magnificent sports arena capable of accommodating 2.5-3 thousand spectators.

In a remarkable move in February 2019, Delo Group became the title sponsor of the esteemed Women's EHF Champions League. This partnership agreement, covering the 2019-20 and 2020-21 seasons, resulted in the tournament being proudly renamed as the DELO Women's EHF Champions League, with the climax of the competition now recognized as the DELO Women's EHF FINAL4. This historic collaboration made Delo Group the first-ever title sponsor in the prestigious history of the women's handball league.

Since 2022, the Group has proudly become a sponsor of the esteemed Novorossiysk, FC Chernomorets. Looking ahead to 2023, Sergey Shishkarev has excitingly announced that Delo Group intends to either construct a brand-new stadium in Novorossiysk for FC Chernomorets, capable of accommodating 15-18 thousand spectators, or alternatively, undertake a reconstruction of the existing stadium.

In the same year, the notable Russian handball and rugby federations announced the formalization of a collaboration agreement. This momentous agreement includes plans to establish a state-of-the-art sports centre in the Fili district. This remarkable facility will feature a versatile arena capable of accommodating 5,000 attendees and specifically designed for handball and other indoor sporting events. As stated by Sergey Shishkarev, it will be a captivating sports cluster where handball aims to become the key athletic pursuit.

=== Demography ===
Since 2022, Delo Group has been implementing a corporate program to encourage an increase in the birth rate and the formation of larger families among employees' families. In 2023, the corporate program was extended to all assets of the Group.
