= Sergey Shishkarev =

Russian businessman and political figure (born 1968)

Sergey Shishkarev Сергей Николаевич Шишкарёв
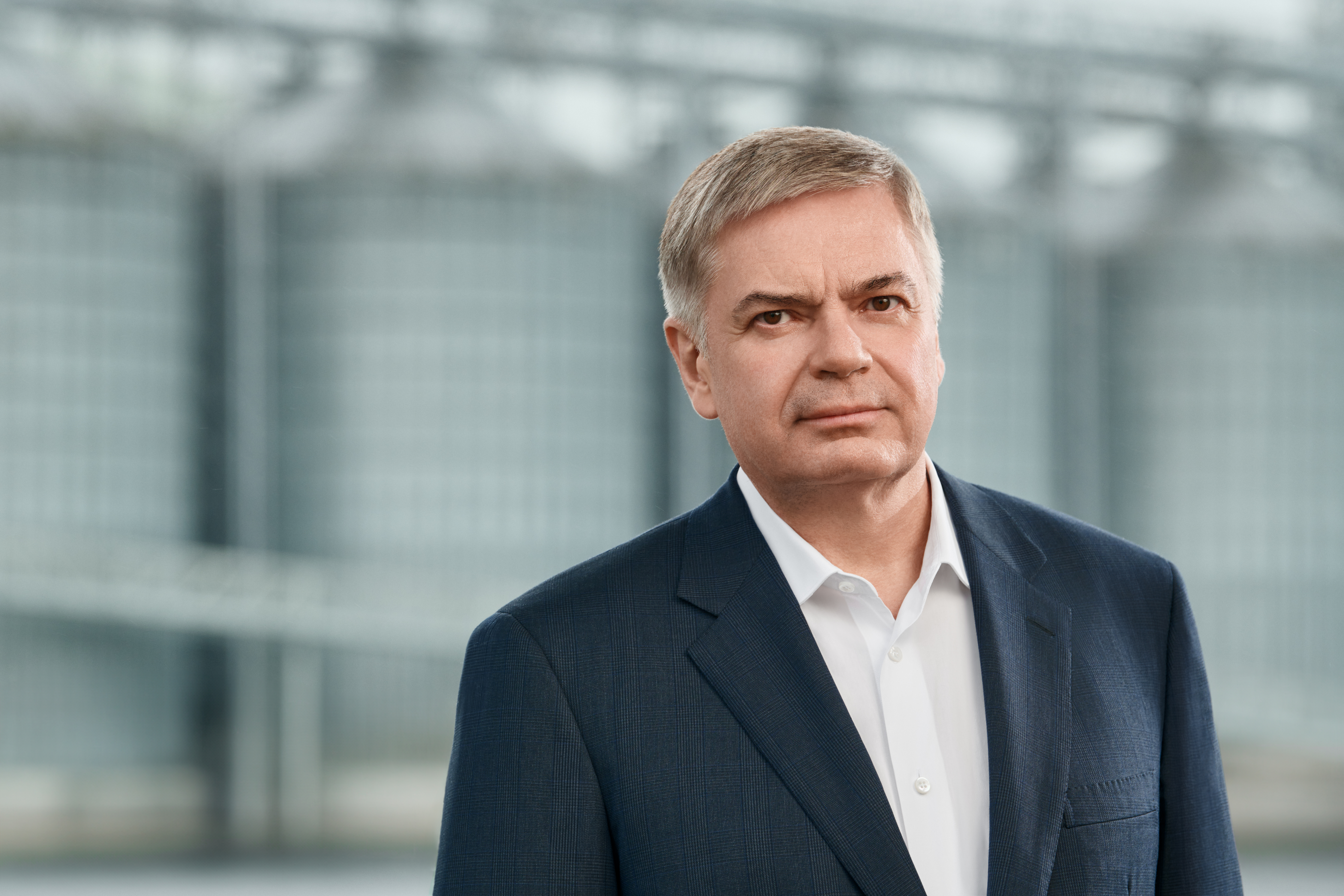
- Born: Sergey Nikolaevich Shishkarev; 2 February 1968 (age 58); Novorossiysk, Soviet Union
- Citizenship: Russian Federation
- Occupations: Businessman, sports official, public figure
- Spouse: Married
- Children: 5
- Website: www.shishkarev.ru/en//

Sergey Nikolaevich Shishkarev (Russian: Серге́й Николаевич Шишкарёв, born on 2 February 1968 in Novorossiysk) is a Russian entrepreneur, ex-politician, and public figure. He is the founder and chairman of the board of directors of the Delo Group. Additionally, he holds the vice-president of the Russian Olympic Committee and Chairman of the Supreme Council of the Handball Federation of Russia. He is a Doctor of Law.

== Biography ==
=== Education ===
In 1985, he enrolled in the Minsk State Linguistic University. However, during his second year, he received a call to serve in the Armed Forces and joined the Northern Fleet Marine Corps. Upon the recommendation of his superiors, he was accepted into the Military Red Banner Institute of the Ministry of Defence, specializing in Western languages. He successfully completed his studies in 1992, graduating with outstanding academic achievements. He earned a diploma with honors and obtained qualifications as a military executive assistant and interpreter in Portuguese and Hungarian languages. Additionally, he holds the rank of reserve colonel. In 2001, he defended his dissertation titled "The Police System of France" and was awarded the academic degree of Candidate of Legal Sciences.

In 2003, he completed his studies with distinction at the Russian Academy of State Service under the President of the Russian Federation, majoring in "Finance, Taxes, and Credit." He has authored more than 30 publications addressing the establishment of an anti-corruption legal framework in the Russian Federation. In 2010, he successfully defended his dissertation titled "Legal Order in the Field of Combating Corruption: Theoretical and Legal Research," which earned him a Doctor of Juridical Sciences degree.

Furthermore, he possesses fluent proficiency in four foreign languages: English, Portuguese, Hungarian, and Italian.

=== Political involvement ===
Shishkarev has been actively engaged in politics as a member of the State Duma in the Russian Federation. He served as a deputy for three consecutive convocations, from 1999 to 2011.

During his tenure in the 3rd convocation from 1999 to 2003, Shishkarev was elected as a deputy of the State Duma. He held a position as the Chairman of the State Duma Committee on International Affairs. Additionally, he played a role in the Federal Assembly of the Russian Federation's permanent delegation to the Parliamentary Assembly of the Organization for Security and Co-operation in Europe (OSCE). Furthermore, he took charge of the bureau of the special representative of the President of the Russian Federation, focusing on matters concerning the Kaliningrad Oblast in relation to the enlargement of the European Union.

In the 4th convocation, which spanned from 2003 to 2007, Shishkarev secured his position as a deputy of the State Duma once again. He served as the Deputy Chairman of the Committee on Energy, Transport, and Communications.

From 2007 to 2011, he served as a member of the State Duma of the Federal Assembly of the Russian Federation, 5th convocation. During his tenure, he held the position of Chairman of the State Duma Committee on Transport, overseeing the affairs of Novorossiysk, Anapa, Gelendzhik, Sochi, and the Tuapse District.

For three years, from 2008 to 2011, he excelled as the leader of the delegation representing the Federal Assembly of the Russian Federation to the Parliamentary Assembly of the Black Sea Economic Cooperation.

He was the mastermind behind more than 50 legislative bills, some of which included "On Mandatory Technical Inspection in the Russian Federation," "Traffic Rules in the Russian Federation," and "On Airports and Activities in Airports of the Russian Federation." Additionally, he took the lead in crafting legislation on intelligent transportation systems and pipeline transport. An advocate for reform in road traffic organization and the establishment of a federal service for traffic management, he consistently presented proposals on these matters for several years.

=== Business activities ===
In 1993, Sergey Shishkaryov founded the Delo Group, which he headed until 1999. Since July 2014, he has been President of the Delo Group and currently serves as chairman of the Board of Directors of the Delo Group. He was twice elected to the Board of Directors of Novorossiysk Commercial Sea Port.

=== Public life ===
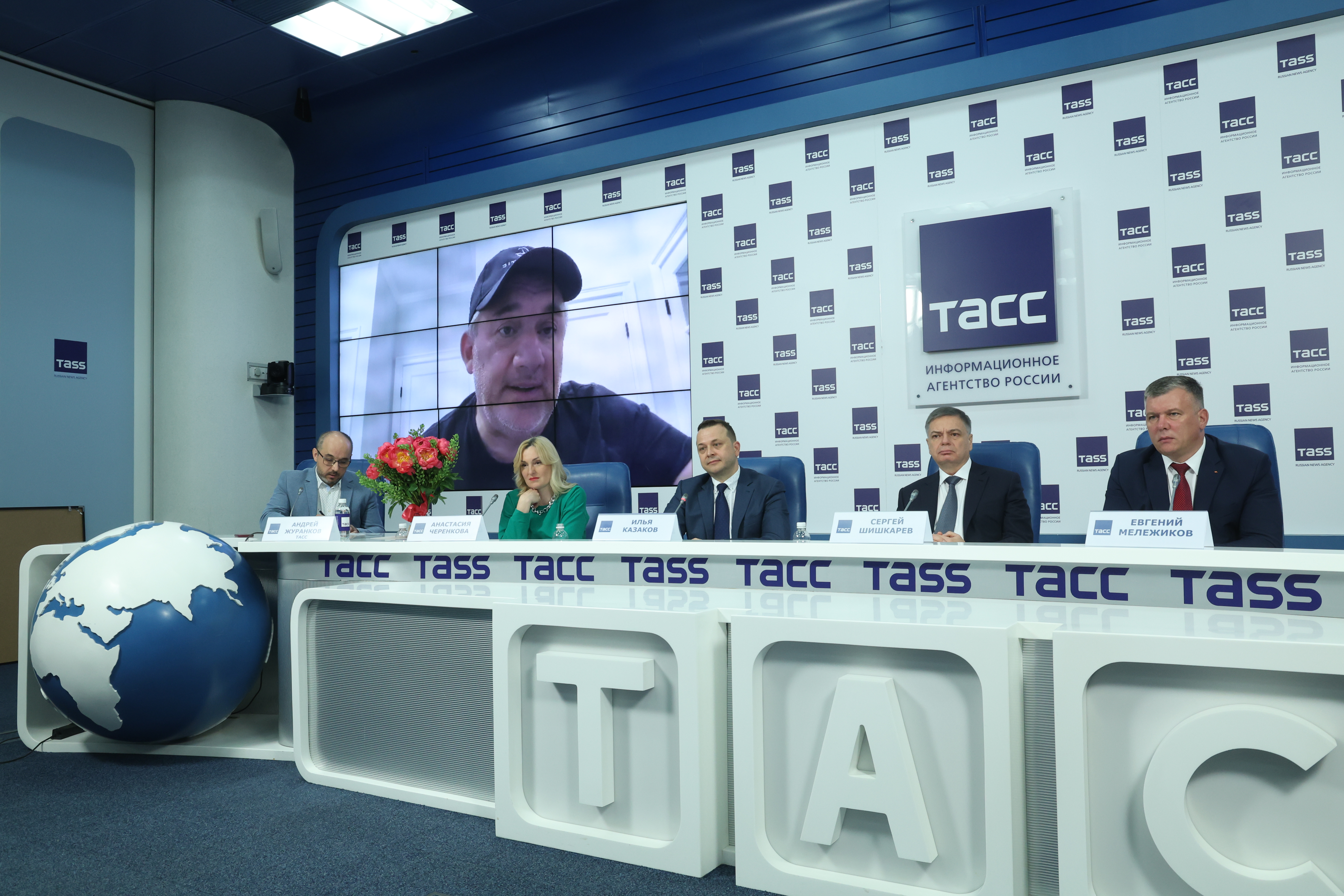
During the presentation of the artistic film project "Fyodor, the People's Footballer" at TASS on 23rd May 2023.

On 7 April 2015, Shishkarev was elected as the President of the Handball Federation of Russia (HFR). In the summer of 2016, the Russia women's national handball team achieved gold at the Olympic Games in Rio de Janeiro.

In December 2016, Shishkarev was re-elected as the President of the Handball Federation for a four-year term. On 16 October 2020, Shishkarev was re-elected as the President of the HFR. In the summer of 2021, the Russian women's national handball team secured a silver medal at the Olympic Games in Tokyo. In December 2022, he was elected as the Vice President of the Russian Olympic Committee. In February 2023, Shishkarev assumed the role of Chairman of the Supreme Council of the Handball Federation of Russia.

The companies of the Delo Group support a number of Russian handball clubs:

- HBC CSKA Moscow (women)
- HBC CSKA Moscow (men)
- HC Kuban Krasnodar (women)
- HC Chernomorochka (women)
- HC Zilant (men)

In September 2018, with the initiative and support of Shishkarev and veterans, the first monument to port workers was opened in Novorossiysk, Russia. In September 2022, with the participation of Sergei Shishkarev, a sports playground was opened for local residents in Zabaykalsk, and an entrance stele was installed, with the main element being the White-naped crane - a symbol of Zabaykalsk. The funds for these projects were allocated by one of the companies of the Delo Group. At the initiative of Sergei Shishkarev, the Delo Group has launched and is implementing a demographic project to increase birth rates and support motherhood and childhood.

In September 2022, the Delo Group of Companies graciously assumed the role of sponsor for the FC Chernomorets Novorossiysk. The culmination of their support came to fruition in May 2023, when the team claimed victory in the 2022–23 Russian Second League.

In May 2023, during a press conference Sergey Shishkaryov announced the start of shooting a feature film about the legend of FC Spartak Moscow and Soviet Union national football team Fedor Cherenkov. As Shishkarev said, the film about the legendary footballer has the working title "Fedya, the people's footballer.

=== Family ===
He is the father of three sons and two daughters.

=== Awards ===
- Awarded the Order of Friendship for the successful training of athletes who achieved great sporting triumphs at the XXXI Olympic Games in 2016, held in Rio de Janeiro, Brazil.
- Received the Order of Honor for ensuring the successful training of athletes who achieved exceptional accomplishments at the XXXII Summer Olympic Games and XVI Paralympic Summer Games in Tokyo, Japan.
- Granted the honorary citizenship of the city of Novorossiysk.
- Medal of the Order "For Merit to the Fatherland" II degree (2007)
- Order of the Russian Orthodox Church of the Holy Prince Daniel of Moscow III degree
- Order of St. Sergius of Radonezh III degree

== Publications ==
- Shishkarev S.N. Police System in France: PhD candidate thesis, Moscow, 2001. (Russian: Шишкарев, С. Н. Полицейская система Франции:диссертация кандидата юридических наук: 12.00.14/ Москва, 2001).
- Shishkarev S.N. Legal Fundamentals of Anti-Corruption policy in Russia. ISBN 978-5-238-01232-2 (Russian: Шишкарёв, С.Н. Правовые основы антикоррупционной политики России: история и современность : монография. Москва).
- Shishkarev S.N. Legislative Order in Russian Federation in Fighting Corruption Sphere. 2009. ISBN 978-5-238-01905-5 (Russian: Шишкарёв, С. Н. Правовой порядок Российской Федерации в сфере противодействия коррупции. Москва, 2009).
- Shishkarev S.N. Legislative Backing to Fighting Corruption: International and Russian Experience. 2006. ISBN 5-238-00862-7 (Russian: Шишкарёв, С. Н. Законодательное обеспечение борьбы с коррупцией: международный и российский опыт. Москва, 2006).
- Shishkarev S.N. Anti-Corruption Law Order: Theoretical and Practical Analysis. 2010. ISBN 978-5-98227-756-5 (Russian: Шишкарев, С. Н. Антикоррупционный правовой порядок: теоретико-правовой анализ: монография. Москва, 2010).
- Shishkarev S.N. Conceptual and Legislative Basis of Anti-Corruption Policy. 2010. ISBN 978-5-98227-742-8 (Russian: Шишкарев, С. Н. Концептуальные и правовые основы антикоррупционной политики. Москва, 2010).
