= Expert RA =

Russian credit rating agency

- Type: Joint-stock company
- Industry: Credit Rating Agency
- Founded: 1997
- Headquarters: Moscow, Russia
- Key people: Marina Chekurova - CEO/Chairman of the Board

Expert RA is Russia's oldest credit rating agency and also the largest one in terms of both customers and headcount. Expert RA has been assigning credit ratings for 20 years. Expert RA is on the list of authorized rating institutions, meaning that its credit ratings are applicable for regulatory purposes to banks, insurers, pension funds, and debt issuers.

== History ==
- 1998 - Expert RA creates its Analytics & Communications Business line
- 2010 - Expert RA accredited by Russia's Ministry of Finance
- 2016 - Central Bank of Russia has included Expert RA in the list of accredited credit agencies
- 2017 - Change of the rating scale, 19 gradations introduce in the rating system
- 2018 - Expert RA signs a strategic partnership memorandum with China Chengxin Credit Rating Group (CCXI).
- 2019 - Establishing Expert Business-Solutions, a company intended to support non-rating analytical products.
- 2020 - International Capital Market Association (ICMA) has included Expert RA in the list of independent verifiers of green and social bonds.
- 2021 Expert RA assigned ESG ratings (sustainability ratings) to the first six Russian companies.
- 2022 Marina Chekurova headed this agency as CEO and chairman of the board. Expert RA launched the Expert Pages project, a service for corporations with an extensive database of Russian business companies.

== Main activities ==
=== Credit Ratings ===
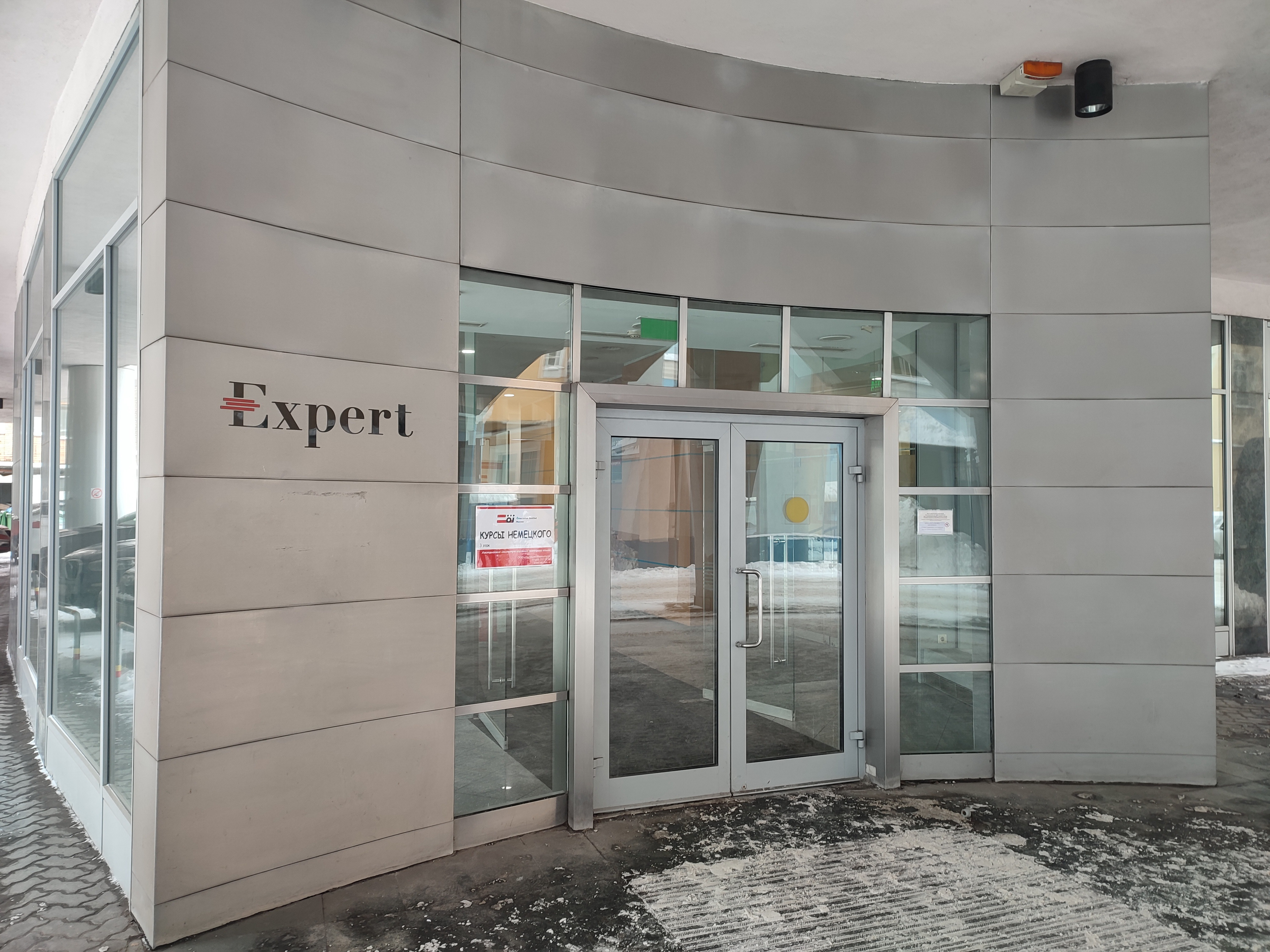
Expert RA office entrance, Moscow

Expert RA has more than 700 credit ratings outstanding, including 449 issuer and 334 issue credit ratings (as of January 1, 2022).

The agency assigns credit ratings to regions and municipalities.

=== Communications & Analytics ===
Expert RA addresses key national issues in cooperation with government agencies, public associations, and regional authorities.

=== Surveys ===
Expert RA publishes over 50 research papers and analytical reports on insurance, banking, asset management, leasing, factoring, auditing, consulting and other industries annually as well rankings.

=== Business Events ===
Every year, Expert RA holds events such as forums, conferences, and round tables.

== Rating Scale ==
Expert RA National Rating Scale for the Russian Federation Effective from 10 April 2017

Category	Level	Definition
AAA	ruAAA	The rating object is characterised by the maximum level of creditworthiness/financial reliability/financial strength. The highest level of creditworthiness/financial reliability/financial strength according to the national scale for the Russian Federation, in the Agency's opinion.
AA	ruAA+	High level of creditworthiness/financial reliability/financial strength compared to other objects of the rating in the Russian Federation, being only slightly lower than the level of the rating objects in the ruAAA rating category.
AA	ruAA	High level of creditworthiness/financial reliability/financial strength compared to other objects of the rating in the Russian Federation, being only slightly lower than the level of the rating objects in the ruAAA rating category.
AA	ruAA-	High level of creditworthiness/financial reliability/financial strength compared to other objects of the rating in the Russian Federation, being only slightly lower than the level of the rating objects in the ruAAA rating category.
A	ruA+	Moderately high level of creditworthiness/financial reliability/financial strength compared to other objects of the rating in the Russian Federation; however, some sensitivity to adverse changes of economic situation is observed.
A	ruA	Moderately high level of creditworthiness/financial reliability/financial strength compared to other objects of the rating in the Russian Federation; however, some sensitivity to adverse changes of economic situation is observed.
A	ruA-	Moderately high level of creditworthiness/financial reliability/financial strength compared to other objects of the rating in the Russian Federation; however, some sensitivity to adverse changes of economic situation is observed.
BBB	ruBBB+	Moderate level of creditworthiness/financial reliability/financial strength compared to other objects of the rating in the Russian Federation, while the observed sensitivity to adverse changes of economic situation is higher than that of the rating objects in the ruA rating category.
BBB	ruBBB	Moderate level of creditworthiness/financial reliability/financial strength compared to other objects of the rating in the Russian Federation, while the observed sensitivity to adverse changes of economic situation is higher than that of the rating objects in the ruA rating category.
BBB	ruBBB-	Moderate level of creditworthiness/financial reliability/financial strength compared to other objects of the rating in the Russian Federation, while the observed sensitivity to adverse changes of economic situation is higher than that of the rating objects in the ruA rating category.
BB	ruBB+	Moderately low level of creditworthiness/financial reliability/financial strength compared to other objects of the rating in the Russian Federation. High sensitivity to adverse changes of economic situation is observed.
BB	ruBB	Moderately low level of creditworthiness/financial reliability/financial strength compared to other objects of the rating in the Russian Federation. High sensitivity to adverse changes of economic situation is observed.
BB	ruBB-	Moderately low level of creditworthiness/financial reliability/financial strength compared to other objects of the rating in the Russian Federation. High sensitivity to adverse changes of economic situation is observed.
B	ruB+	Low level of creditworthiness/financial reliability/financial strength compared to other objects of the rating in the Russian Federation. The ability to fulfil financial obligations in full and in a timely manner is currently maintained, while the safety margin is limited. The ability to fulfil obligations is sensitive to an economic downturn.
B	ruB	Low level of creditworthiness/financial reliability/financial strength compared to other objects of the rating in the Russian Federation. The ability to fulfil financial obligations in full and in a timely manner is currently maintained, while the safety margin is limited. The ability to fulfil obligations is sensitive to an economic downturn.
B	ruB-	Low level of creditworthiness/financial reliability/financial strength compared to other objects of the rating in the Russian Federation. The ability to fulfil financial obligations in full and in a timely manner is currently maintained, while the safety margin is limited. The ability to fulfil obligations is sensitive to an economic downturn.
CCC	ruCCC	Very low level of creditworthiness/financial reliability/financial strength compared to other objects of the rating in the Russian Federation. It is considerably likely that the rating object fails to fulfil its financial obligations in the short term.
CC	ruCC	Very low level of creditworthiness/financial reliability/financial strength compared to other objects of the rating in the Russian Federation. It is increasingly likely that the rating object fails to fulfil its financial obligations in the short term.
C	ruC	Very low level of creditworthiness/financial reliability/financial strength compared to other objects of the rating in the Russian Federation. It is very likely that the rating object fails to fulfil its financial obligations in the short term. It is highly unlikely that financial obligations will be fulfilled in a timely manner.
RD	ruRD	The rating object is under supervision of the governmental regulatory agencies which can determine priority of the obligations. However, the Agency has not recorded a default yet.
D	ruD	The rating object is in default.

== Rating methodologies ==
Expert RA has 18 active credit rating methodologies, of which 12 are recognized by the regulator as fully complying with Law 222-FZ and suitable for regulatory purposes.

Recognized for regulatory purposes

- Bank Credit Rating Methodology
- Credit Rating Methodology for Debt Instruments
- Credit Rating Methodology for Local & Regional Governments
- Credit Rating Methodology for Non-Financial Companies
- Insurer Financial Strength Rating Methodology
- Holding Companies Credit Rating Methodology
- Credit Rating Methodology for Project Finance Companies
- Credit Rating Methodology for Leasing Companies
- Credit Rating Methodology for Microfinance Companies
- Life Insurer Financial Strength Rating Methodology
- Credit Rating Methodology for Financial Companies
- Financial Strength Rating Methodology for Regional Guarantee Organizations

== See also ==
- ACRA (rating agency)
