= Hong Kong Re-entry Permit =

Travel document

HKSAR Re-entry Permit 香港特別行政區回港證
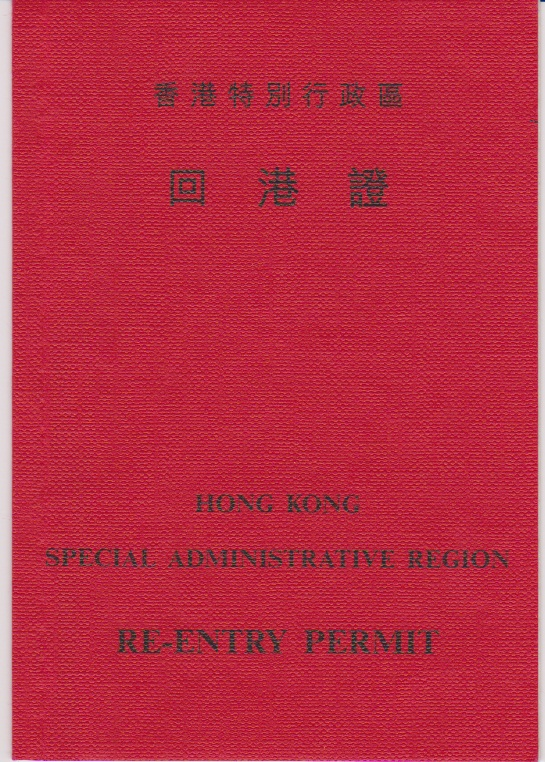
- Type: Travel document
- Issued by: Hong Kong
- Cost: Single entry – HK$55; Multiple entries – HK$170

Hong Kong Re-entry Permit
- Traditional Chinese: 香港特別行政區回港證
- Simplified Chinese: 香港特别行政区回港证
Transcriptions
Yue: Cantonese
- Jyutping: hoeng1 gong2 dak6 bit6 hang4 zing3 keoi1 wui4 gong2 zing3

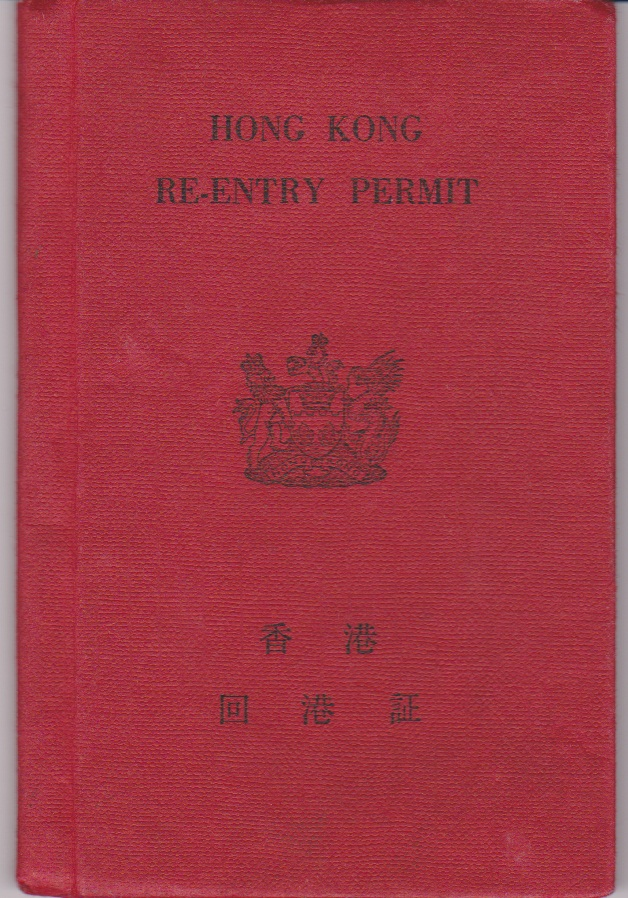
Hong Kong Re-entry Permit (colonial version)

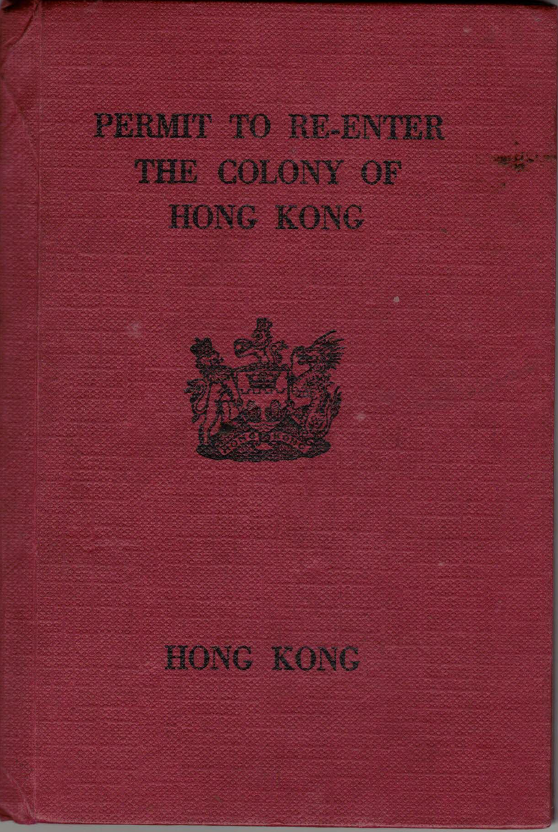
Hong Kong Re-entry Permit (the Colony of Hong Kong version)

Hong Kong Re-entry Permits (Chinese: 回港證; Cantonese Yale: Wùigóngjing) are issued to Hong Kong residents by the Hong Kong Special Administrative Region (HKSAR) for travel to mainland China and Macau Special Administrative Region.

== Eligibility ==
The eligibility of Hong Kong Re-entry permit is:

- Chinese citizens who have either acquired the right of abode or been granted unconditional stay in Hong Kong.
- Persons not of Chinese nationality who have been granted unconditional stay in Hong Kong but cannot obtain national passports or travel documents of any other countries or regions.

However, holders of Hong Kong Identity Cards (bearing '***', '*' or 'R' symbol or locally issued Permanent Identity Cards) who are aged 11 or over, can pass through Hong Kong immigration control points by simply showing their Hong Kong Identity Cards without other travel documents (including Hong Kong Re-entry Permit). They are also not required to fill in arrival/departure cards.

On the other hand, children under the age of 11 are not required to obtain a Hong Kong identity card. Thus they have to present the Hong Kong Re-entry permit at the Hong Kong immigration control points for identification purpose. Therefore, the majority holders of Hong Kong Re-entry Permit are Hong Kong Permanents or people been granted unconditional stay who are under 11 years old.

Hong Kong Identity Cards (bearing '***', '*' or 'R' symbol or Permanent Identity Cards) or Hong Kong Re-entry Permits themselves are sufficient travelling documents to enter Macau for a maximum period of one year. However, all Hong Kong Identity Cards are not travelling documents for immigration control points of mainland China. Chinese citizens of Hong Kong Identity cards or Hong Kong Re-entry Permit holders must apply for Home Return Permit to enter mainland China.

== Types of permits ==
- a single Re-entry Permit is good for a single journey and valid for six months.
- a multiple Re-entry Permit is good for multiple journeys and valid for five years.

== Other forms of documents used in Hong Kong ==
- Hong Kong Identity Cards
- British National (Overseas) passport
- British Dependent Territories Citizen passport
- Hong Kong SAR passport
- Hong Kong Document of Identity for Visa Purposes
- Hong Kong Certificate of Identity

== See also ==
- Home Return Permit
- Taiwan Compatriot Pass
