= Visa policy of Singapore =

Policy on permits required to enter Singapore

Most visitors to Singapore may enter without a visa for up to 30 or 90 days, depending on their nationality.

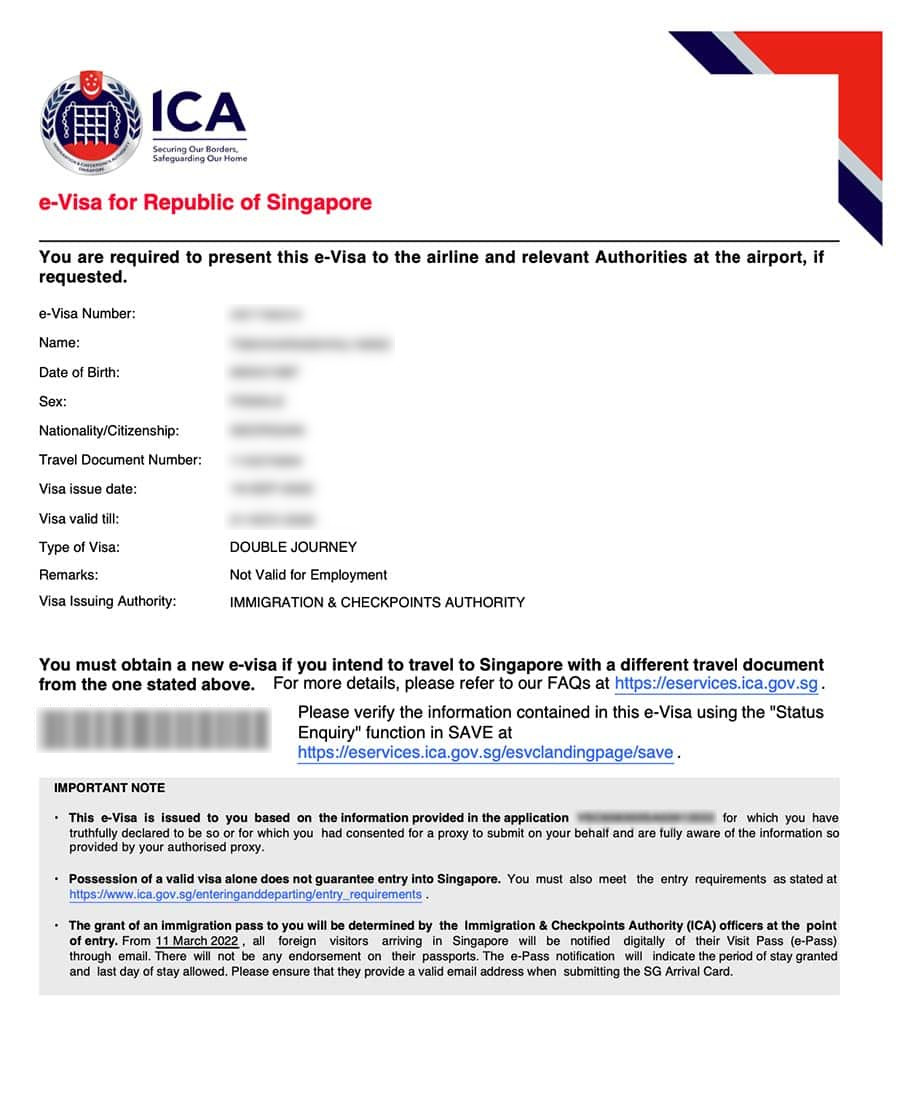
Sample of Singaporean eVisa. Singapore no longer endorses any sticker visas or passport stamps in any travel documents.

However, citizens of certain countries and territories must obtain an e-Visa.

In recent years, applications for work permits, Student’s Passes and permanent residence have been submitted online. However, applicants may still be required to provide their biometrics (photograph and fingerprints) as part of the application process. Depending on the applicant’s nationality, a visa may be required; visa applications are submitted electronically and, where applicable, through an authorised visa agent.

== Entry requirements ==
All visitors to Singapore must:

- hold a passport or a travel document valid for more than 6 months at the time of departure,
- hold an onward or return ticket;
- have sufficient funds for the duration of stay in Singapore;
- have entry documents (including a visa if required) to their next destination (if applicable);
- have a visa and/or a yellow fever vaccination certificate for entry into Singapore (if applicable).

=== SG Arrival Card ===
Sample of SG Arrival Card

Before entering Singapore, all travellers, except

- Those transiting/transferring through Singapore without seeking immigration clearance; and
- Residents (Singapore citizens, Permanent Residents, Long-Term Pass holders) travelling through Woodlands and Tuas Checkpoints.

are required to submit an SG Arrival Card online, which provides personal information, trip details and health declaration, to Singapore immigration. Singapore citizens are exempt from the requirement to submit an SG Arrival Card if entering Singapore by land.

The SG Arrival Card must be submitted within three days before the date of arrival in Singapore, to avoid unnecessary delays during immigration clearance. It is free of charge and is not a visa, so travellers may have different requirements according to their nationality. The paper-based Disembarkation Card has been discontinued since 2020.

== Visa policy map ==
Visa policy of Singapore Singapore Visa not required (90 days) Visa not required (30 days) eVisa (only through a local contact or an authorised visa agent)

== Visa exemption ==
Citizens of the following countries and territories may enter Singapore without a visa for the following period:

90 days

- All European Union member states

- Australia
- New Zealand
- Norway
- South Korea
- Switzerland
- United Kingdom^{1}
- United States

_{1 - Visa-free entry for holders of British passports without proof of right of abode in the United Kingdom is shortened to 30 days.}

30 days

- All ASEAN member states
- (Cooperation Council for the Arab States of the Gulf) All Gulf Cooperation Council member states^{2}

- Albania
- Andorra
- Angola
- Antigua and Barbuda
- Argentina
- Bahamas
- Barbados
- Belize
- Benin
- Bhutan
- Bolivia
- Bosnia and Herzegovina
- Botswana
- Brazil
- Burkina Faso
- Burundi
- Cameroon
- Canada
- Cape Verde
- Central African Republic
- Chad
- Chile
- China^{1}
- Colombia
- Comoros
- Congo
- DR Congo
- Costa Rica
- Cuba
- Djibouti
- Dominica
- Dominican Republic
- Ecuador
- El Salvador
- Equatorial Guinea
- Eritrea
- Eswatini
- Ethiopia
- Fiji
- Gabon
- Gambia
- Ghana
- Grenada
- Guatemala
- Guinea
- Guinea-Bissau
- Guyana
- Haiti
- Honduras
- Hong Kong^{1}
- Iceland
- Israel
- Ivory Coast
- Jamaica
- Japan
- Kenya
- Kiribati
- Lesotho
- Liberia
- Liechtenstein
- Macau^{1}
- Madagascar
- Malawi
- Maldives
- Marshall Islands
- Mauritania
- Mauritius
- Mexico
- Micronesia
- Monaco
- Mongolia
- Montenegro
- Mozambique
- Namibia
- Nauru
- Nepal
- Nicaragua
- Niger
- North Macedonia
- Palau
- Panama
- Papua New Guinea
- Paraguay
- Peru
- Rwanda
- Saint Kitts and Nevis
- Saint Lucia
- Saint Vincent and the Grenadines
- Samoa
- San Marino
- São Tomé and Príncipe
- Saudi Arabia
- Senegal
- Serbia
- Seychelles
- Sierra Leone
- Solomon Islands
- South Africa
- Sri Lanka
- Suriname
- Taiwan^{3}
- Tanzania
- Togo
- Tonga
- Trinidad and Tobago
- Turkey
- Tuvalu
- Uganda
- Uruguay
- Vanuatu
- Vatican City
- Venezuela
- Zambia
- Zimbabwe

_{1 - For Chinese citizens with People's Republic of China passports, Hong Kong Special Administrative Region passports or Macao Special Administrative Region passports only.}
_{2 - Holders of United Arab Emirates temporary passports are not eligible for visa exemption and must obtain a visa.}
_{3 - Holders of Taiwan passports who do not have the right of abode in Taiwan must hold a valid Taiwan re-entry permit to exempt visa requirement.}

=== APEC Business Travel Card (ABTC) ===
Holders of passports issued by the following jurisdictions who also possess an APEC Business Travel Card (ABTC) containing the "SGP" code on the reverse, which indicates that it is valid for travel to Singapore, can enter Singapore without a visa for business trips of up to 60 days.

ABTC holders are eligible to use automated immigration clearance lanes upon arrival and departure.

ABTCs are issued to citizens of:

- Australia
- Brunei
- Chile
- China
- Hong Kong
- Indonesia
- Japan
- Malaysia
- Mexico
- New Zealand
- Papua New Guinea
- Peru
- Philippines
- Russia
- South Korea
- Taiwan
- Thailand
- Vietnam

== Electronic visa (e-Visa) ==
Singapore categorises countries whose citizens require a visa to enter into two groups – Assessment Level I and Assessment Level II countries.

=== Assessment Level I Countries ===
Holders of normal passports or travel documents issued by Assessment Level I countries and territories may obtain an e-visa from the Immigration and Checkpoints Authority (ICA)'s online portal through a local Singaporean contact or a strategic partner in Singapore; if successful, the applicant can enter Singapore with a printout of the e-visa. Applicants may alternatively obtain a visa from one of its authorized visa agents outside Singapore, in which case a local Singaporean contact is not required.

e-Visa and regular visa applications lodged by nationals of the following countries are processed in 3 working days, excluding the day the application was submitted. Visa requirement does not apply to holders of non-ordinary passports of these countries, with the exception of North Korea.

- All CIS member states

- Georgia
- India
- Moldova
- North Korea
- Turkmenistan
- Ukraine

e-Visa and regular visa applications lodged by holders of the following three travel documents are also processed in 3 working days, excluding the day the application was submitted:

- Holders of Hong Kong Document of Identity for Visa Purposes
- Holders of Macao Special Administrative Region Travel Permit
- Holders of People's Republic of China Travel Document

=== Assessment Level II Countries ===
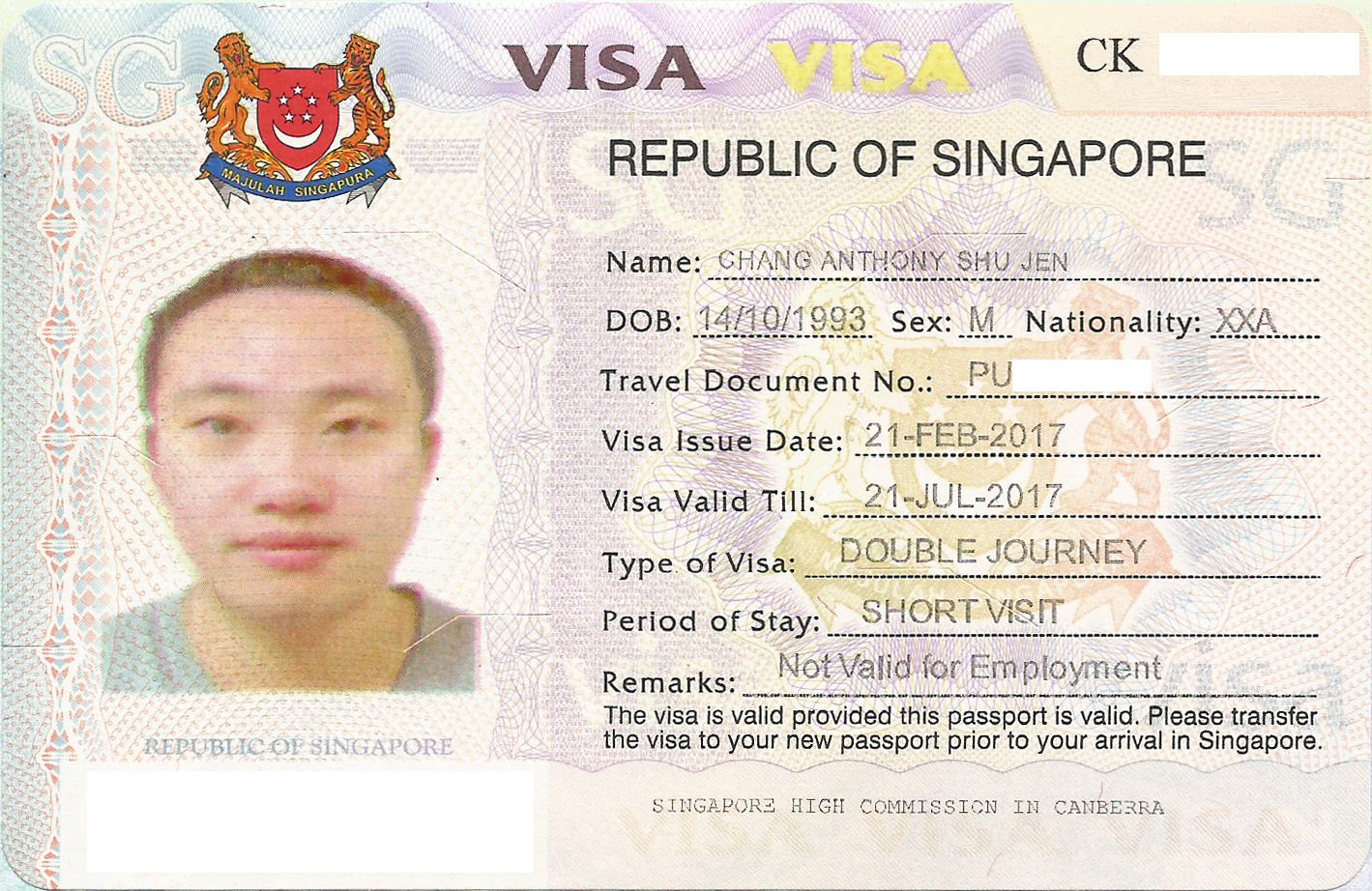
Singapore visa vignette issued to a stateless person in 2017.

Holders of all passports or travel documents issued by Assessment Level II countries and territories may obtain an e-visa from the Immigration and Checkpoints Authority (ICA)'s online portal through a local Singaporean contact or a strategic partner in Singapore; if successful, the applicant can enter Singapore with a printout of the e-visa. Applicants may alternatively obtain a visa from one of its authorized visa agents outside Singapore – however, a "letter of introduction for Visa Application" to support the visa application is required, which can be issued by a local Singaporean contact or an authorised visa agent. e-Visa and regular visa applications lodged by nationals of the following countries and territories are processed in 3 working days, excluding the day the application was submitted.

Visa requirements also apply to non-ordinary passport holders of these countries, unless otherwise noted.

- Afghanistan
- Algeria
- Bangladesh^{DOS}
- Egypt^{D}
- Iran
- Iraq
- Jordan^{DOS}
- Kosovo
- Lebanon
- Libya
- Mali
- Morocco^{D}
- Nigeria^{DOS}
- Pakistan
- Palestine
- Somalia
- South Sudan
- Sudan
- Syria
- Tunisia^{DOS}
- Yemen

_{DOS - Holders of diplomatic, official and service passports are exempt from visa requirements.}
_{D - Holders of diplomatic passports are exempt from visa requirements.}

- Holders of temporary passports issued by the United Arab Emirates
- Holders of refugee travel documents issued by any Middle-East country
- Stateless persons (a holder of an alien's passport, such as certificate of identity and refugee travel document, is considered as stateless by ICA, regardless of the nationality appearing on the holder's travel document)

=== Summary ===
Summary of policies for visa-required countries
Nationality/document/identity	Visa exemption by passport type			Transit without visa policy	Visa application	
Nationality/document/identity	Diplomatic	Service/official	Ordinary	Transit without visa policy	Introduction letter	Processing time
(Commonwealth of Independent States) CIS member states	Yes	Yes	No	96-hour VFTF	Not required	3 business days
Georgia	Yes	Yes	No	96-hour VFTF	Not required	3 business days
Moldova	Yes	Yes	No	96-hour VFTF	Not required	3 business days
Turkmenistan	Yes	Yes	No	96-hour VFTF	Not required	3 business days
Ukraine	Yes	Yes	No	96-hour VFTF	Not required	3 business days
(China) CTD/HKDI/MTP	—	—	—	96-hour conditional VFTF	Not required	3 business days
India	Yes	Yes	No	96-hour conditional VFTF	Not required	3 business days
Bangladesh	Yes	Yes	No	In-airport transit	Required	3 business days
Jordan	Yes	Yes	No	In-airport transit	Required	3 business days
Nigeria	Yes	Yes	No	In-airport transit	Required	3 business days
Tunisia	Yes	Yes	No	In-airport transit	Required	3 business days
Egypt	Yes	No	No	In-airport transit	Required	3 business days
Morocco	Yes	No	No	In-airport transit	Required	3 business days
North Korea	No	No	No	In-airport transit	Not required	3 business days
Afghanistan	No	No	No	In-airport transit	Required	3 business days
Algeria	No	No	No	In-airport transit	Required	3 business days
Iran	No	No	No	In-airport transit	Required	3 business days
Iraq	No	No	No	In-airport transit	Required	3 business days
Kosovo	No	No	No	In-airport transit	Required	3 business days
Lebanon	No	No	No	In-airport transit	Required	3 business days
Libya	No	No	No	In-airport transit	Required	3 business days
Mali	No	No	No	In-airport transit	Required	3 business days
Pakistan	No	No	No	In-airport transit	Required	3 business days
Palestine	No	No	No	In-airport transit	Required	3 business days
Somalia	No	No	No	In-airport transit	Required	3 business days
South Sudan	No	No	No	In-airport transit	Required	3 business days
Sudan	No	No	No	In-airport transit	Required	3 business days
Syria	No	No	No	In-airport transit	Required	3 business days
Yemen	No	No	No	In-airport transit	Required	3 business days
United Arab Emirates temporary passport	—	—	—	In-airport transit	Required	3 business days
Refugee in Middle East	—	—	—	In-airport transit	Required	3 business days
Stateless person	—	—	—	In-airport transit	Required	3 business days

== Automated Clearance Initiative (ACI) ==
Under the Immigration & Checkpoints Authority (ICA)’s Automated Clearance Initiative (ACI), eligible foreign visitors, including those visiting Singapore for the first time, can use automated lanes for both arrival and departure immigration clearance without the need for prior enrolment. As of April 2023, the ACI was deployed to 130 automated lanes at Changi Airport and 40 automated lanes at the land checkpoints.

Travellers are required to provide a valid email address within their SG Arrival card submissions in order to receive their Electronic Visit Pass (e-Pass) when using the automated lanes; travellers will not be issued an arrival immigration endorsement in their passports.

Under the ACI, eligible arriving foreign visitors are directed to the automated lanes for immigration clearance.

a) Their biometrics (iris, facial and fingerprint images) are automatically enrolled during the arrival clearance process (if not already enrolled during a previous trip to Singapore).

b) Information on their enrolment is included in the electronic visit pass (e-Pass) which is emailed to them after immigration clearance.

c) Enrolled foreign visitors will then be able to use designated automated lanes during departure and on subsequent visits to Singapore.

ACI is a critical component of ICA’s New Clearance Concept (NCC), which aimed to make automated immigration clearance the norm at the checkpoints. Automated immigration lanes leverage multi-modal biometric scanning technology to provide travellers with a more secure, efficient, and seamless immigration clearance experience.

Through the use of automated lanes which take up less physical space and require less manpower than manual counters, ICA would be able to increase its clearance throughput and meet the growing traveller volume, which was expected to reach 300 million travellers per year by 2025.

=== Eligibility ===
All biometric passport holders, regardless of nationality, can utilise the Automated Clearance Initiative (ACI) to enter and leave Singapore through Changi Airport.

In addition, biometric passport holders of the following 60 jurisdictions (aged 6 and above), as well as APEC Business Travel Card holders, can utilise the Automated Clearance Initiative (ACI) to enter and leave Singapore through Woodlands Checkpoint, Tuas Checkpoint and Marina Bay Cruise Centre:

- All ASEAN member states
- All European Union member states

- Australia
- Bangladesh
- Canada
- China
- Hong Kong
- Iceland
- Israel
- Japan
- Jordan
- Kuwait
- Macao
- Norway
- New Zealand
- Qatar
- Saudi Arabia
- South Africa
- South Korea
- Sri Lanka
- Switzerland
- Taiwan
- United Arab Emirates
- United Kingdom^{1}
- United States

_{1 - For British passport holders, only British citizens are eligible.}

== Transit without visa ==
=== Transit through Changi Airport ===
Nationals of Assessment Level I and II countries do not require a visa to transit through Changi Airport as long as they fulfill the following requirements:

- have an onward ticket,
- remain in the transit area,
- have their luggage checked to their final destination,
- do not clear immigration to enter Singapore, and,
- are not travelling on a low-cost airline (except for passengers travelling on Scoot with Scoot-thru, or Jetstar with connecting flights purchased on the same booking).

Nationals of certain Assessment Level I countries may clear immigration to enter Singapore under the Visa Free Transit Facility.

=== Visa-Free Transit Facility (VFTF) ===
==== Nationals of China and India ====
Nationals of China^{1} and India may enter Singapore without a visa for 96 hours if they are in transit to or from any third country by air, and possess a valid visa or long-term residence permit with validity of at least one month issued by Australia, Canada, Germany, Japan, New Zealand, Switzerland, United Kingdom or United States. Schengen visas are also accepted if the visa allows entry into Germany or Switzerland.

Single-journey visas issued by these eight countries are also acceptable for transit, but if using the VFTF on the return journey (i.e. after the single journey visa has been used) the traveller must travel directly from the visa-issuing country and directly back to the home country, and the traveller must have not returned to their home country since the single journey visa was last used.

They may enter Singapore by any mode of transport but must depart by air or sea. They must have a valid onward air/ferry/cruise ticket departing Singapore within 96 hours.

_{1- Chinese citizens who hold Chinese passports are visa exempt in general, while holders of other travel documents who require a visa may use this policy.}

==== Other eligible nationals ====
Nationals of the Commonwealth of Independent States (CIS), Georgia, Moldova, Turkmenistan and Ukraine may enter Singapore without a visa for 96 hours if they are in transit to or from any third country. These nationals may use the VFTF on both the forward and the return journey. They may enter Singapore by any mode of transport but must depart by air.

- Armenia
- Azerbaijan
- Belarus
- Georgia
- Kazakhstan
- Kyrgyzstan
- Moldova
- Russia
- Tajikistan
- Turkmenistan
- Ukraine
- Uzbekistan

== Admission restrictions ==
=== Mandatory yellow fever vaccination ===
All travellers, including Singapore residents, who arrive in Singapore from countries with risk of yellow fever transmission (listed below) require an International Certificate of Vaccination in order to enter Singapore. Failure to provide a valid yellow fever vaccination certificate, would result in the traveller being quarantined under Section 31 of the Infectious Disease Act, for a maximum of six days upon arrival in Singapore. Non-residents who object to the quarantine, will be denied entry and returned to his/her place of origin or last port of embarkation. The vaccination requirement is imposed by this country for protection against yellow fever since the principal mosquito vector Aedes aegypti is present in its territory.

- Angola
- Argentina
- Benin
- Bolivia
- Brazil
- Burkina Faso
- Burundi
- Cameroon
- Central African Republic
- Chad
- Colombia
- Congo
- Côte d'Ivoire (Ivory Coast)
- Democratic Republic of the Congo
- Ecuador
- Equatorial Guinea
- Ethiopia
- French Guiana (France)
- Gabon
- Gambia
- Ghana
- Guinea
- Guinea-Bissau
- Guyana
- Kenya
- Liberia
- Mali
- Mauritania
- Niger
- Nigeria
- Panama
- Paraguay
- Peru
- Senegal
- Sierra Leone
- South Sudan
- Sudan
- Suriname
- Togo
- Trinidad and Tobago
- Uganda
- Venezuela

=== North Korea ===
According to Timatic, nationals of North Korea are required to be escorted to the Immigration and Checkpoints Authority upon entering or transiting Singapore.

=== History ===
Due to the COVID-19 pandemic, all short-term visitors were not allowed to enter or transit through Singapore effective 23 March 2020, 2359 hours.

From 29 March 2020, 2359 hours, all Singapore long-term pass holders, as well as those granted in-principle approval for long-term passes, were required to obtain an entry approval from the relevant government agency (Immigration and Checkpoints Authority, Ministry of Education or Ministry of Manpower) before commencing their journey to Singapore. All travellers will need to submit a health and travel declaration online before arrival, and will be issued a 14-day stay home notice upon arrival.

All COVID-19 related border measures were lifted starting 13 February 2023.

== Visitor statistics ==
Most visitors arriving to Singapore on short-term basis were from the following countries of nationality:

Source: Singapore Tourism Analytics Network

Country or territory	2021	2022	2023	2024	2025
China	88,250	130,870	1,128,440	3,082,218	3,100,144
Indonesia	33,460	1,104,160	1,872,030	2,489,342	2,439,829
Malaysia	24,220	590,960	891,890	1,185,127	1,275,378
Australia	10,050	565,680	884,270	1,174,372	1,267,428
India	54,380	686,470	887,260	1,197,107	1,207,162
Philippines	11,490	381,990	568,380	779,078	726,065
United States	10,960	318,450	516,040	692,466	716,909
Japan	5,920	132,110	359,050	573,236	627,512
United Kingdom	8,550	226,740	384,060	579,958	587,356
South Korea	7,130	217,530	488,370	594,898	587,010
Taiwan	3,410	65,050	289,980	403,367	422,688
Thailand	4,380	283,430	393,210	364,741	386,488
Germany	5,410	130,590	249,770	349,181	356,380
Vietnam	3,440	312,710	406,410	393,184	344,286
Hong Kong	5,430	129,050	267,910	305,842	337,647
France	4,210	86,090	142,140	179,365	196,657
Myanmar	10,020	85,290	100,550	134,916	169,642
New Zealand	595	57,080	115,910	144,733	165,080
Bangladesh	17,900	102,990	98,730	121,760	156,959
Canada	1,690	55,020	102,970	126,971	153,785
United Arab Emirates	940	42,970	66,100	83,630	102,534
Italy	1,230	33,120	63,710	86,843	99,866
Netherlands	1,960	51,180	76,600	89,291	97,505
Switzerland	1,320	36,290	62,050	83,223	95,812
Spain	777	30,460	49,640	64,685	77,999
Russia	388	9,800	46,460	54,891	69,167
Sri Lanka	1,470	35,520	44,260	56,880	68,732
Brunei	1,250	31,640	47,580	49,495	56,125
Belgium	355	14,364	28,920	36,762	38,152
South Africa	159	13,020	19,910	24,455	35,983
Sweden	545	13,500	21,330	26,027	33,360
Denmark	730	16,410	23,590	27,992	31,149
Saudi Arabia	196	7,170	18,620	26,396	30,935
Ireland	263	11,086	22,743	26,134	28,205
Finland	355	9,780	15,580	23,214	26,962
Norway	425	12,690	20,270	22,998	25,508
Israel	704	11,940	14,040	16,011	23,825
Pakistan	195	10,560	14,690	17,224	22,590
Kuwait	38	3,650	7,470	7,685	7,924
Mauritius	35	2,410	4,010	4,788	6,240
Iran	54	1,370	4,910	6,862	5,857

== See also ==
- Visa requirements for Singaporean citizens
