= British Certificate of Travel =

Travel document issued to non-citizens, resident in United Kingdom

Certificate of Travel
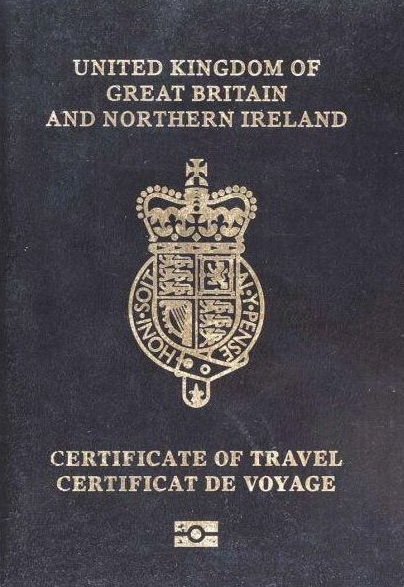
- The front cover of the British Certificate of Travel
- Type: Travel document
- Issued by: United Kingdom
- Purpose: International travel document
- Eligibility: Alien resident of the United Kingdom who does not qualify for either a Refugee travel document or a Stateless person's travel document
- Expiration: Up to 5 years

The British Certificate of Travel (COT) is an international travel document and a type of Home Office travel document issued by the UK Home Office to non-citizen residents of the United Kingdom who are unable to obtain a national passport or other conventional travel documents. Until 17 March 2008, the Certificate of Travel was called a Certificate of Identity (CID). It is usually valid for five years, or if the holder only has temporary permission to stay in the United Kingdom, the validity will be identical to the length of stay permitted.

Hong Kong Chinese nationals without a British National (Overseas) passport and resident in the UK for many years can apply for a British Certificate of Travel valid for five years since they are not stateless, yet not qualified for neither British nor Chinese passport, provided that they have originally entered the UK on a Hong Kong Certificate of Identity that has expired.

== Eligibility ==
Typically, to be eligible for a Certificate of Travel, applicants must have been formally and unreasonably refused a passport by their own authorities. According to the Home Office guidance, applicants can apply for a certificate of travel if one of the following is true:

- The applicant(s) have permission to stay (known as ‘leave to remain’) or are settled in the UK (known as ‘indefinite leave to remain’), and have been refused a passport or travel document by their country's national authorities
- The applicant(s) are in the UK with humanitarian protection and it is officially accepted that they have a fear of their country's national authorities as part of your asylum application
- The applicant(s) are in the UK on a family reunion visa because they have joined someone who has humanitarian protection
- The applicant(s) were born in the UK as the child of someone with refugee status and they have permission to stay but do not have refugee status themselves
- The applicant(s) have an important reason to travel and their country's national authorities are unable to issue them with a passport or emergency travel document quickly

== Physical appearance ==
=== Outside cover ===
The current issue British Certificate of Travel are black, and the document cover is an acrylic-coated, paper-based substrate.

The blue passport sports the seal of the Privy Council emblazoned in the centre of the front cover. The name of the document – "CERTIFICATE OF TRAVEL" and its French equivalent "CERTIFICAT DE VOYAGE" are inscribed below the Privy seal, and the name of the issuing government is inscribed above (i.e., "UNITED KINGDOM OF GREAT BRITAIN AND NORTHERN IRELAND"). The biometric passport symbol appears at the bottom of the front cover.

=== Inside cover ===
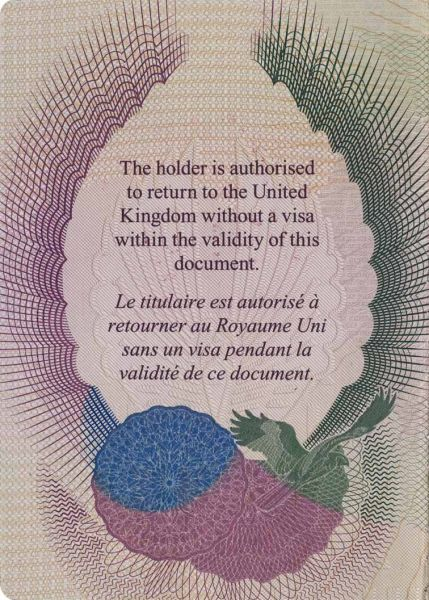
Inside front cover of British Certificate of Travel.

British Certificate of Travel contain on their inside cover the following words in English:

The holder is authorised to return to the United Kingdom without a visa within the validity of this document.

Since the validity of British Certificate of Travel will be identical to the length of stay permitted (their 'leave to remain'), this remark is placed in lieu of the British visa which guarantees the immigration officers at the third country that the document holder will be allowed to travel back to UK and wouldn't become stranded once admitted.

=== Information page ===
British Certificate of Travel issued by HM Passport Office include the following data on the information page:

- Photograph of the owner/holder (digital image printed on page)
- Type (PT)
- Code of issuing state (GBR)
- Passport number (even though the document is presented as a travel document)
- Surname
- Given names
- Nationality
- Date of birth
- Sex (Gender)
- Place of birth
- Date of issue
- Authority
- Date of expiry
- Machine-readable zone starting with PTGBR

The items are identified by text in English and French (e.g., "Date of birth/Date de naissance").

=== Official Observations page ===
British Certificate of Travel is issued with printed endorsements on the Official Observations page, in upper case (capital letters). They form part of the passport when it is issued, as distinct from immigration stamps subsequently entered in the visa pages. Observations page contains biometric chip and antenna; any printed observations will be within the antenna area.

Some examples are:

- VALID FOR TRAVEL TO ALL COUNTRIES
- VALID FOR TRAVEL TO ALL COUNTRIES EXCEPT FOR LATVIA
- CURRENTLY NO TIME LIMIT ON THE HOLDER'S STAY IN THE UK

== Countries which do not recognise the Certificate ==
As of 15 April 2022, most European countries accept British Certificate of Travel as a valid travel document, with the following countries imposing limited conditions:

- Belgium, the Netherlands, and Luxembourg: recognised only for exit to return to UK
- Portugal: recognised only for exit to return to UK
- Spain: recognised only if it allows holder to return to UK with no time limit
