= Hong Kong Certificate of Identity =

Travel document (1997–2007)

- Type: Travel document
- Issued by: Hong Kong
- Purpose: Identification
- Eligibility: Permanent residence

Hong Kong Certificate of Identity
- Traditional Chinese: 香港身份證明書
Transcriptions
Yue: Cantonese
- Yale Romanization: Hēung góng sān fán jing mìhng syū
- Jyutping: Hoeng1 gong2 san1 fan2 zing3 ming4 syu1

The Hong Kong Certificate of Identity (CI) was a formal travel document and passport, issued by the Hong Kong Government's Immigration Department until 30 June 1997 (See transfer of sovereignty over Hong Kong). It is no longer possible to possess a valid CI as a travel document, as all CIs have expired by 30 June 2007, though most CI holders should be eligible to hold the HKSAR Passport.

== Eligibility ==
Certificates of Identity were issued to Hong Kong permanent residents who did not hold and could not obtain any valid travel documents for overseas travel. For example, permanent residents who were citizens of People's Republic of China (PRC) could obtain neither their Chinese passports unless they held hukou registration in Mainland China, nor their British passports unless they naturalized as British citizens or British Dependent Territories citizens tied in Hong Kong. Such persons could be issued CI in lieu of the national passport. CI were not used to enter the PRC (Mainland China) or Portuguese Macau, and other means of travel documents and/or entry permits were required.

Normally, CI were valid for 10 years.

Since establishment of the Hong Kong Special Administrative Region on 1 July 1997, no more CI were issued. Those already issued remained valid for travel until expiry (which may pass beyond 30 June 1997; as CIs were valid for a maximum of 10 years), none of which past 30 June 2007. CI holders who are PRC citizens are now eligible for Hong Kong passport.

== CI and PRC citizenship ==
Most (but not all) former CI holders were solely People's Republic of China (PRC) citizens. Many of them were immigrants from mainland China who had acquired the right of abode in Hong Kong. They did not co-hold any type of British nationality (See British nationality law and Hong Kong for details pertaining to various kinds of British nationalities). Before the handover, they were not eligible for any kinds of PRC passports. The PRC only issued Home Return Permit for them to enter mainland China only. If they did not choose to acquire British nationality through naturalisation, they could apply for the CI as a travel document from the colonial Hong Kong Government.

Travel abroad was very difficult for CI holders because a CI was not proof of nationality, unlike a passport, thus rendering CI holders practically “stateless,” even though most of them were Chinese nationals. Most countries and territories required CI holders to obtain visas before travelling.

After the handover, all Hong Kong permanent residents with PRC Citizenship are eligible to apply for a Hong Kong SAR passport.

== Endorsements on CIs ==
On 1 July 1987, the concept of "right of abode" was introduced in Hong Kong legislation. A modified Hong Kong Certificate of Identity was introduced to ensure that Certificates of Identity would be acceptable for the purpose of international travel both before and after the handover of Hong Kong. These documents contain an endorsement showing that “the holder has the right of abode in Hong Kong”.

To ensure Certificate of Identity will be acceptable for the purpose of international travel and for the return to HK after 30 June 1997, the British and the Chinese Government have agreed that the Certificate of Identity contain the following endorsement:

The holder of this passport has Hong Kong permanent identity card number xxxx which states that the holder has the right of abode in Hong Kong.

== Acceptance and visa-free access ==
Countries that allowed Hong Kong Certificate of Identity holders to visit without visas:

- South Korea: 30 days
- Palau: no specific limit of stay (subject to final decision made by immigration officer, on individual merit)
- Netherlands Antilles / Aruba: 14 days
- Northern Mariana Islands: 1 month
- Singapore: 30 days

After the HKSAR was established, a number of countries have ceased to accept CI's at different times. Those not yet eligible for HKSAR passports would recourse to the Document of Identity.

However it is no longer possible to possess a valid CI as a travel document, because all CIs have expired by 30 June 2007.

== Notes contained in the Certificate of Identity ==
The following statements were printed in both English and traditional Chinese.

=== Front cover ===
The present Certificate is issued for the sole purpose of providing the holder with identity papers in lieu of a national passport. It is without prejudice to and in no way affects the national status of the holder. If the holder obtains a national passport this Certificate ceases to be valid and must be surrendered to the issuing authority or nearest British Consulate, High Commission or Passport Office for cancellation and return to the Holder. 本証明書之發給，旨在使本証持有人獲得証明身份之文件以作代替護照之用。本証明書對持有人之國籍地位並無妨害，亦無影響。倘持有人另行領得護照時本証明書卽吿無效，屆時必須將之繳回發証機關或就近之英國領事館、高級專員公署或護照簽發處，以便於註銷後歸還持有人。

=== Back cover ===
1. This Certificate of Identity remains property of the Hong Kong government. It will normally be cancelled if the holder obtains a national passport or other travel document.
2. Certificates of identity are normally valid for ten years from date of issue, but may be made valid for shorter periods in certain circumstances.
3. The holder may return to Hong Kong without visa, provided the Certificate is valid.
4. The holder is advised to obtain visas for any country he wishes to visit or pass through.
5. Should the holder take up residence in a country or territory outside Hong Kong application should be made to the competent authorities of this country of residence for a new travel document.
6. The issue of this certificate does not confer a right on the holder to the protection of British diplomatic or consular representatives abroad, nor does it exempt the holder from the provisions of the Hong Kong Immigration Ordinance Chapter 115.
7. The Certificate is a valuable document and should not be altered in any way or allowed to pass into the possession of an unauthorised person. If lost or destroyed, a report should immediately be made to the issuing office or to the nearest British Consulate, High Commission or Police Office, as well as to the local police.

These notes apply to the following version of the Certificate of Identity: I.D. 67 (Revised) in 1980.

== Other forms of documents used in Hong Kong ==
- British National (Overseas) passport
- British Dependent Territories Citizen passport
- Hong Kong SAR passport
- Document of Identity
- Hong Kong Re-entry Permit
- Other passports of other countries

== See also ==
- Refugee Travel Document
- 1954 Convention Travel Document
- Nansen passport
- Japan Re-entry Permit
