= Hong Kong Special Administrative Region passport =

Formal government-issued travel document

Hong Kong Special Administrative Region passport 香港特別行政區護照
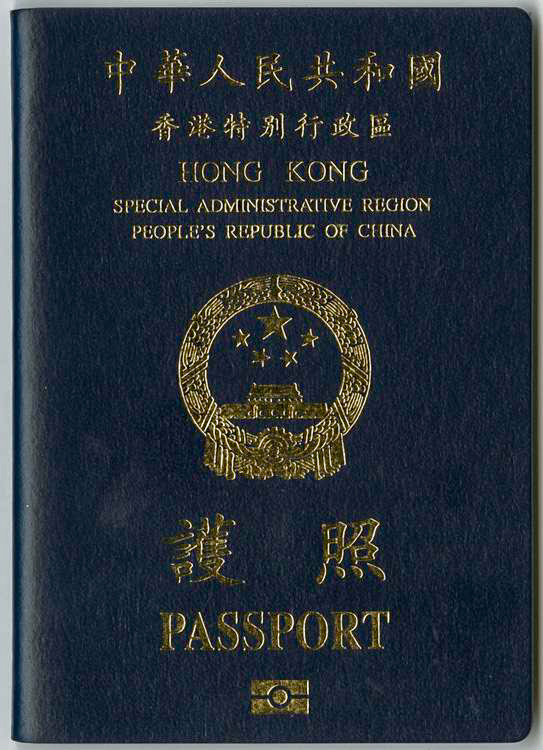
- Cover of the latest version of an HKSAR biometric passport (2007–present)
- Type: Passport
- Issued by: Immigration Department
- First issued: 1 July 1997; 29 years ago (first version); 1 January 2003; 23 years ago (second version); 5 February 2007; 19 years ago (first biometric version); 14 May 2019; 7 years ago (second biometric version)
- Eligibility: Permanent residents of Hong Kong who are also Chinese citizens
- Expiration: 10 years after acquisition for adults aged 16 or over, 5 years for children under age of 16
- Cost: For persons aged 16 or above: 32 pages – HK$370; 48 pages – HK$460 For children aged under 16: 32 pages – HK$185; 48 pages – HK$230 Amendments to the passport: (including amendment of personal particulars or photograph) – HK$84

Hong Kong Special Administrative Region passport
- Traditional Chinese: 香港特別行政區護照
- Simplified Chinese: 香港特别行政区护照
Transcriptions
Standard Mandarin
- Hanyu Pinyin: Xiānggǎng Tèbiéxíngzhèngqū Hùzhào
Yue: Cantonese
- Yale Romanization: Hēung góng dahk biht hàhng jing kēui wuh jiu
- Jyutping: Hoeng^{1} gong^{2} dak^{6} bit^{6} hang^{4} zing^{3} keoi^{1} wu^{6} ziu^{3}

The Hong Kong Special Administrative Region passport (Chinese: 香港特別行政區護照) is a passport issued to permanent residents of Hong Kong who also hold Chinese citizenship. In accordance with the Basic Law of the Hong Kong Special Administrative Region, since the handover in 1997, the passport has been issued by the Immigration Department of the Government of Hong Kong under the authorisation of the Central People's Government of the People's Republic of China. As the official languages of Hong Kong are Chinese and English, the passport is printed bilingually in both Chinese (traditional characters) and English.

Hong Kong SAR passports issued overseas via Chinese diplomatic missions abroad display a “This Passport is issued by…… (Note: Chinese diplomatic missions abroad)” stamp and the mission's official seal on observations page. However, unlike Chinese passports which can be directly issued by Chinese diplomatic missions abroad, the Immigration Department of Hong Kong is the only issuing authority for Hong Kong SAR passports.

In late 2019, the fourth version of the Hong Kong SAR passport was launched. Hong Kong SAR passport holders have visa-free or visa on arrival access to 175 countries and territories, ranking the passport 13th in the world according to the 2026 edition of the Henley Passport Index.

== Name ==
In English, the passport is sometimes referred to by its long-form name which appears on the cover (i.e. the Hong Kong Special Administrative Region Passport – a literal translation of the Chinese title 香港特别行政區護照). Alternatively, the passport is commonly referred to as the Hong Kong SAR passport (Chinese: 香港特區護照) (the Hong Kong legislative ordinance concerning the passport is titled the "Hong Kong Special Administrative Region Passports Ordinance (Chapter 539)", the Hong Kong SAR passport, the HKSAR passport or the Hong Kong passport.

== Historical background ==
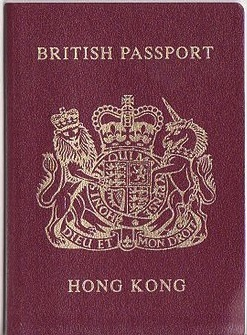
Pre-1997 British HK passport

Hong Kong official travel documents prior to 1997 included the Hong Kong Certificate of Identity (CI), British Dependent Territories Citizen (BDTC), British National (Overseas) (BN(O)) and British Citizen (BC) passports. After 1997, BN(O) and BC passports are still valid but CIs and BDTC passports are no longer in use.

=== First version (1997–2003) ===
The issuing of Hong Kong SAR passports began on 1 July 1997, following the handover of Hong Kong from the United Kingdom to the People's Republic of China. PRC citizens who have right of abode in the HKSAR and who hold Hong Kong permanent resident identity cards, whether or not they are holders of British National (Overseas) passport or Hong Kong Certificate of Identity or other travel documents, are eligible to apply for the Hong Kong SAR passport.

Acquisition of British citizenship in the British Nationality Selection Scheme itself does not affect the eligibility for a HKSAR passport. Nor does the holding of any foreign passport itself affect the eligibility for a HKSAR passport, provided that one remains a PRC citizen.

Under Hong Kong Basic Law, the Government of Hong Kong is responsible for immigration control in the territory. The Hong Kong SAR passport is issued by the Immigration Department of Hong Kong under the authorisation of the Central People's Government (or the State Council). Its design is distinct from other types of People's Republic of China passports and the holders enjoy visa-free entry to more countries than other PRC passports.

=== Second version (2003–2007) ===
Starting from 1 January 2003, the second version of the passport was introduced with enhanced security features. The passport was machine readable, designed for immigration control points equipped with passport scanners. The passport size was 125 mm × 88 mm. The second version of the Hong Kong SAR passport was available either as a 32-page ordinary-size passport or as a 48-page passport.

==== Front cover ====
The cover of the passport was dark blue with wording and the national emblem of the People's Republic of China in gold. The word Passport in Chinese and English is found below the crest. Above are the words Hong Kong Special Administrative Region People's Republic of China, also in Chinese and English. In Chinese, the characters 中華人民共和國 (People's Republic of China) are bigger than the characters 香港特别行政區 (Hong Kong Special Administrative Region) on the passport cover. In English, however, "HONG KONG" is bigger than the phrase "SPECIAL ADMINISTRATIVE REGION PEOPLE'S REPUBLIC OF CHINA".

==== Inner front cover ====
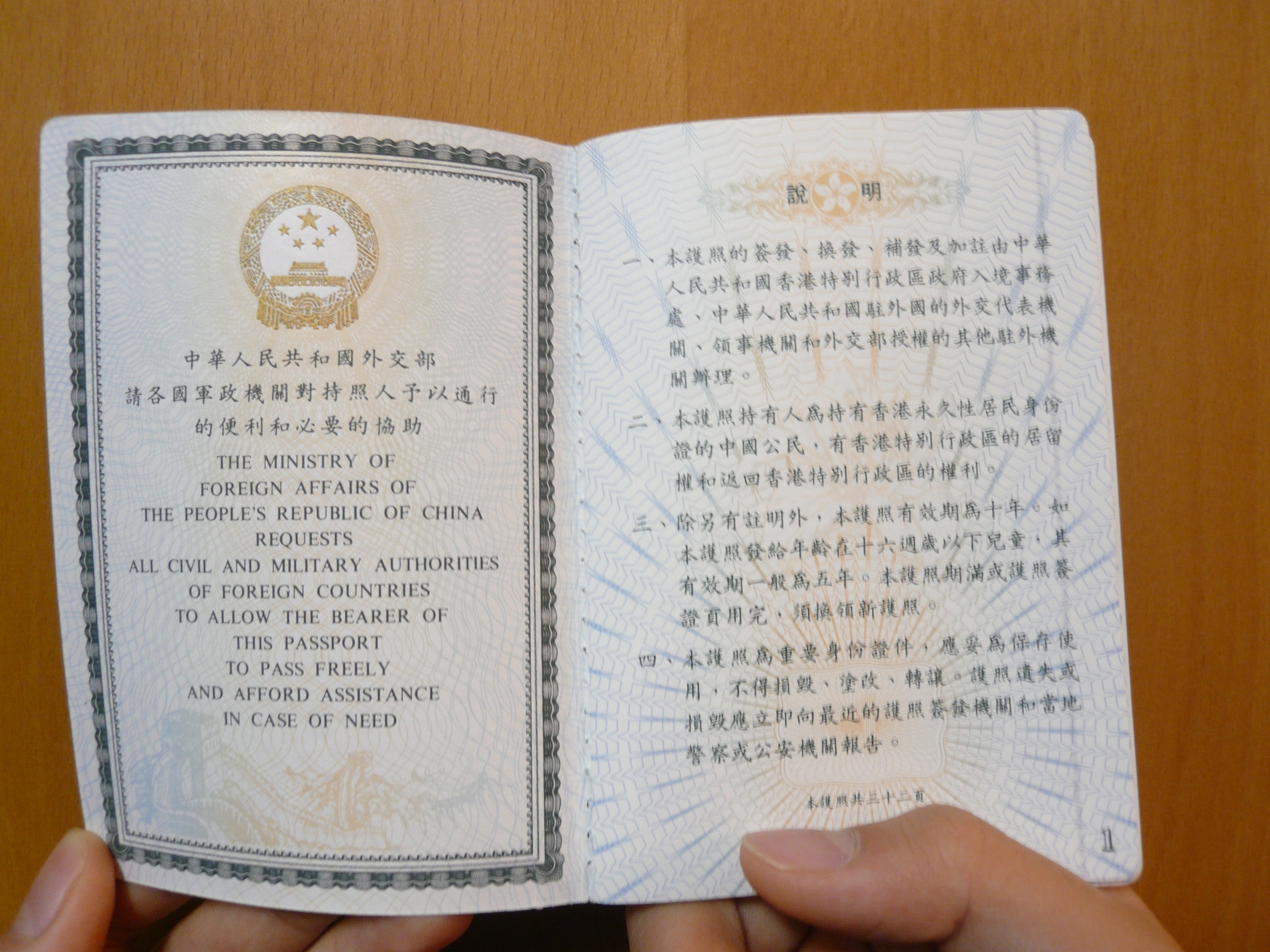
Inner front cover of the Second Version Hong Kong SAR passport

The passport note appeared on the second page in Chinese and English:

中華人民共和國外交部請各國軍政機關對持照人予以通行的便利和必要的協助
The Ministry of Foreign Affairs of the People's Republic of China requests all civil and military authorities of foreign countries to allow the bearer of this passport to pass freely and afford assistance in case of need.

==== Inner pages ====
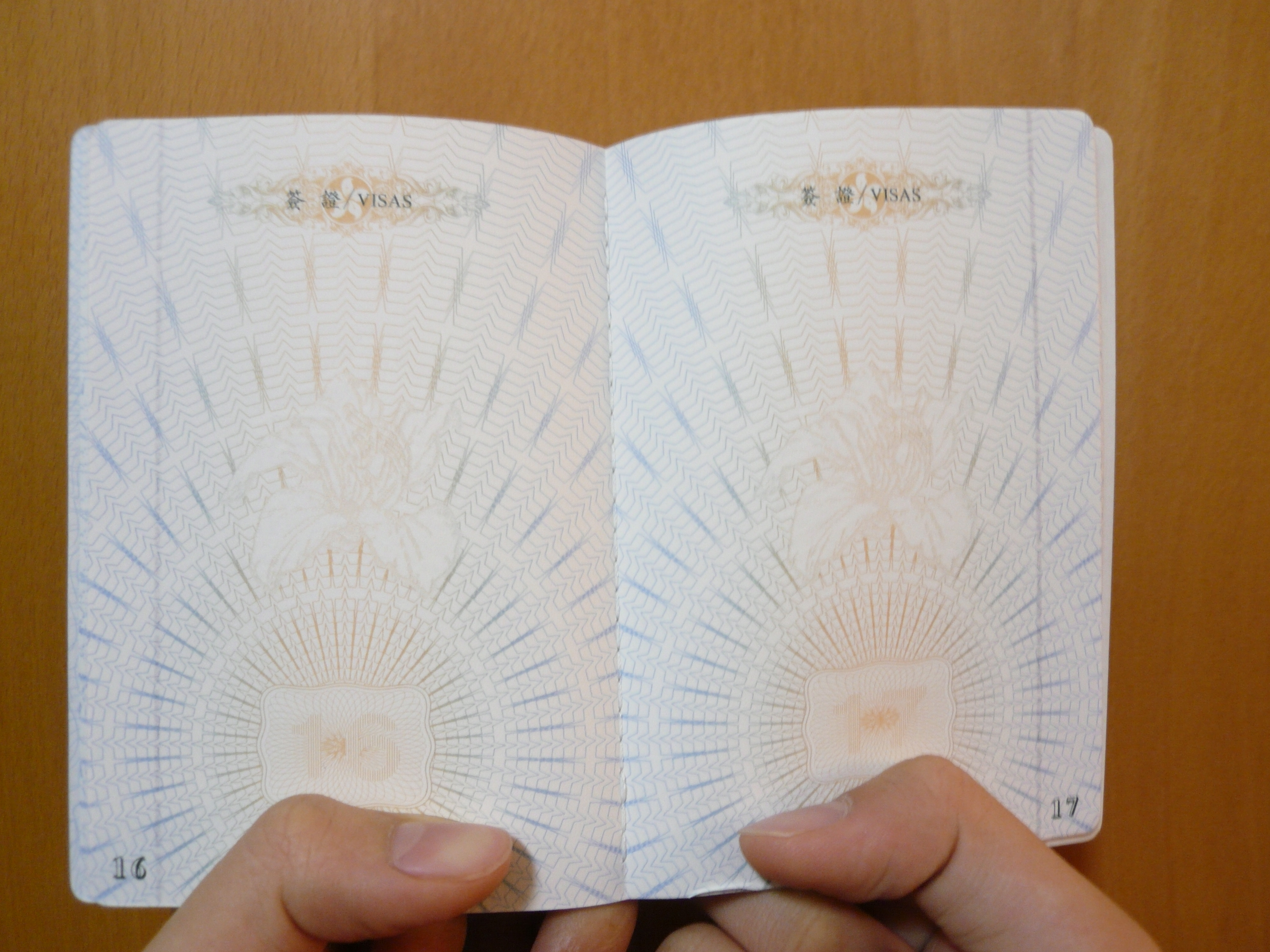
Visa pages of the Second Version Hong Kong SAR passport

The passport's observations page on page 3 had the following:

- the holder's Hong Kong Permanent Identity Card number, and the Chinese Commercial Code of the holder's Chinese name
- if the passport was issued through a Chinese foreign mission, the embassy/consulate would also make an endorsement in the observations stating so.
- an official chop by the Immigration Department
- a machine-readable barcode

The passport's explanatory notes were on page 1 in Chinese, and on page 2 in English. They consisted of the following words:

1. The issuance, replacement, reissuance and endorsement of this passport shall be effected by the Immigration Department of the Government of the Hong Kong Special Administrative Region of the People's Republic of China, diplomatic and consular missions of the People's Republic of China in foreign countries, or other Chinese authorities in foreign countries under the entrustment of the Ministry of Foreign Affairs of the People's Republic of China.
2. The bearer of this passport is a Chinese citizen who holds a Hong Kong permanent identity card and has the right of abode in and the right to return to the Hong Kong Special Administrative Region.
3. This passport is valid for ten years, unless otherwise stated. This passport is normally valid for five years if issued to a child under sixteen years of age. This passport shall be replaced by a new one when its validity period has expired or it has no further space for visas.
4. This passport is an important document of identity which shall be kept carefully and used properly. It shall not be mutilated, tampered with, or transferred to another person for unlawful use. Any case of loss or destruction should be immediately reported to the nearest issuing authority and the local police or public security authorities.

==== Identification page ====
Personal data was recorded on the inner rear cover of the passport, which was covered with a security laminate. Details included were:

- Travel document type: P
- Code of Issuing State: CHN (People's Republic of China)
- Passport number (A valid Hong Kong passport number consists of nine characters: one or two uppercase letters, followed by six digits, and ending with one or two letters or digits)
- Surname and Given Names: in traditional Chinese and English
- Nationality: "CHINESE" (The nationality code is CHN as shown in the machine readable zone)
- Sex: denoted as "M" (male) or "F" (female)
- Place of birth: if born in China, name of province/autonomous region/municipality; if born in Hong Kong or Macao, 'Hong Kong' or 'Macao'; if born in other countries, name of country
- Dates of birth, issue and expiry: displayed in the format DD-MM-YY
- Authority (of issue): "IMMIGRATION DEPARTMENT, HONG KONG SPECIAL ADMINISTRATIVE REGION" (in Chinese and English)

There was also a machine readable zone at the bottom of the identification page.

Changes from the first version included optically variable ink used to print the letters "HKSAR" along the left hand side of the photo and the words "IMMIGRATION DEPARTMENT, HONG KONG SPECIAL ADMINISTRATIVE REGION" in the "Issuing authority" section of the personal data page.

=== Third version (2007–2018) ===
Since the issuing of the Hong Kong Special Administrative Region passport commenced on 1 July 1997 following the handover of Hong Kong, the passport has undergone three different changes, each with security enhancements. In February 2007, the first ePassport was introduced. The design conforms with the document design recommendations of the International Civil Aviation Organization. The new ePassport featured in the 2008 Stockholm Challenge Event and was a finalist for the Stockholm Challenge Award in the Public Administration category. The Hong Kong SAR ePassport design was praised on account of the "multiple state-of-the-art technologies [which] are seamlessly integrated in the sophisticated Electronic Passport System (e-Passport System)".[20] The cover of the new biometric passport remains essentially the same as that of previous versions, with the addition of the biometric passport logo at the bottom.

==== Physical appearance ====
In 2006, the Immigration Department announced that Unihub Limited (a PCCW subsidiary company heading a consortium of suppliers, including Keycorp) had won the tender to provide the technology to produce biometric passports.[22] In February 2007, the first ePassport was introduced. The cover of the new biometric passport remains essentially the same as that of previous versions. The biometric passport symbol appears at the bottom under the word "PASSPORT". However, the design of the inner pages has changed substantially.

==== Inside front cover ====
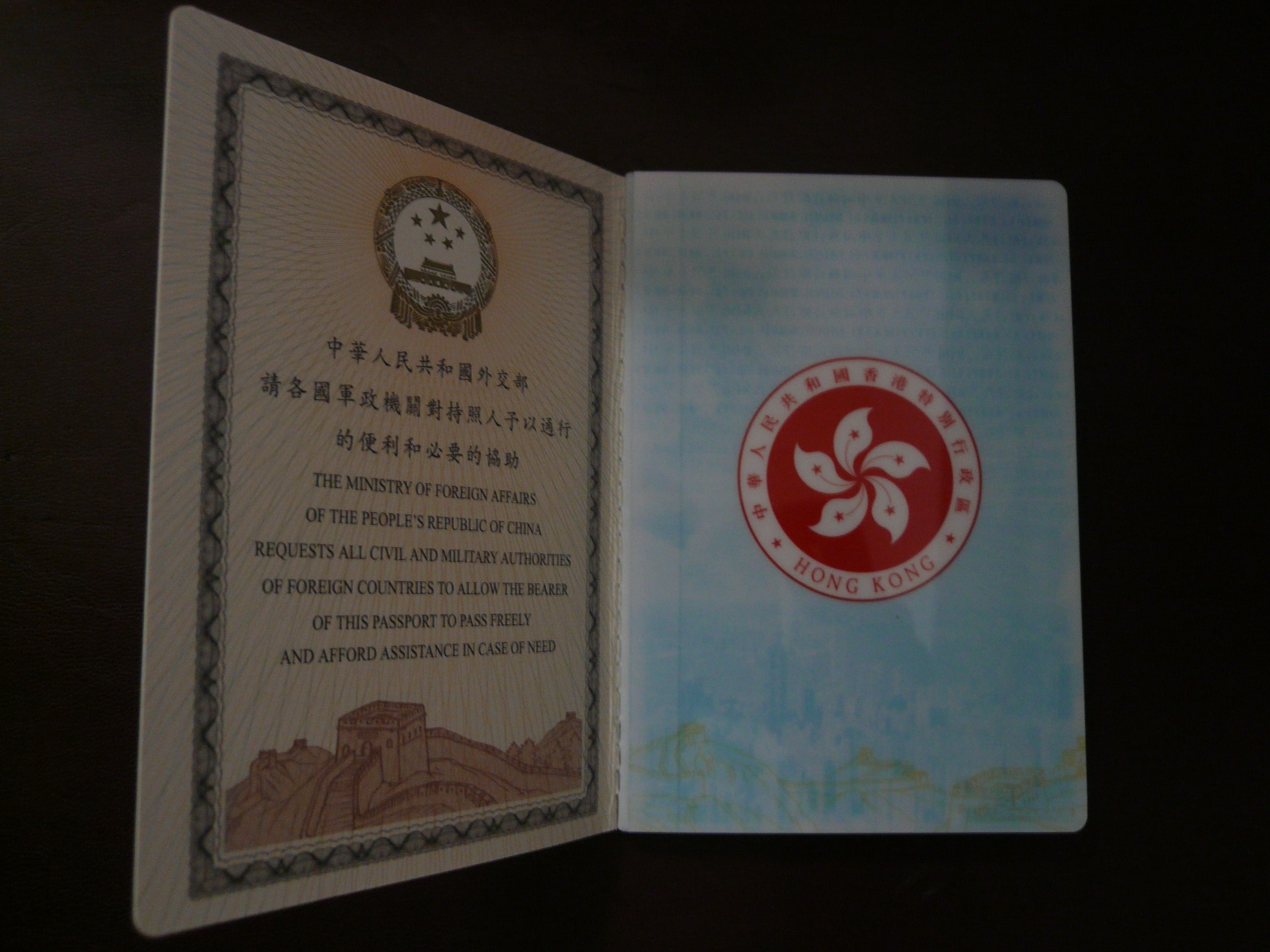
Inner front cover of the Third Version Hong Kong SAR passport

On the inner front cover of the passport, below the crest of the People's Republic of China and above a picture of the Great Wall of China are the following words:

中華人民共和國外交部請各國軍政機關對持照人予以通行的便利和必要的協助 The Ministry of Foreign Affairs of the People's Republic of China requests all civil and military authorities of foreign countries to allow the bearer of this passport to pass freely and afford assistance in case of need.

On the reverse of the polycarbonate identification page insert is a blue image with the Hong Kong Special Administrative Region emblem in the centre. At the top is a pattern of the words "中華人民共和國香港特別行政區 HONG KONG SPECIAL ADMINISTRATIVE REGION PEOPLE'S REPUBLIC OF CHINA". At the bottom is a picture of Victoria Harbour behind an outline of the Great Wall of China.

==== Identification page ====
The identification page appears on a polycarbonate insert between the front cover and the first page. Using laser engraving technology, the holder's photograph is printed in black and white, with the holder's Hong Kong Permanent Identity Card number printed vertically on the right-hand side of the portrait photograph. The passport is also machine readable, designed for immigration control points equipped with passport scanners. Details which are printed include:

- Travel document type: P
- Code of Issuing State: CHN
- Passport number (A valid Hong Kong passport number consists of nine characters: one or two uppercase letters, followed by six digits, and ending with one or two letters or digits)
- Surname and Given Names: in traditional Chinese characters and English
- Nationality: "CHINESE" (The nationality code is CHN as shown in the machine readable zone)
- Sex: denoted as "M" (male) or "F" (female)
- Place of birth: if born in China, the name of the province/autonomous region/municipality in which the bearer was born; if born in Hong Kong or Macao, 'Hong Kong' or 'Macao'; if born in other countries, the name of the country of birth
- Dates of birth, issuance and expiry: displayed in the format DD-MMM-YY
- Authority (of issue): "IMMIGRATION DEPARTMENT, HONG KONG SPECIAL ADMINISTRATIVE REGION" (in Chinese and English)

The code "CHN" (China) is used for both issuing state and nationality. This is the same as PRC passport and Macau SAR passport. (During the British colonial era, a Hong Kong British Dependent Territories Citizen passport used "HKG" as the code of the issuing state and "GBD" as the nationality code.)

Instead of printing the holder's signature on the identification/observation pages, space is reserved on the last page of the passport below the emergency contact information for the holder to complete his/her signature.

===== Security features =====
Enveloping the top right hand corner of the portrait photograph, and the surname, given names and nationality data sections is a kinegram, consisting of an amalgamation of the Chinese and Hong Kong flags, and the letters "HK香港". In the middle of the identification page is a multiple laser image consisting of two circles: in the left hand circle is another image of the holder's portrait photograph, at the bottom of which is the passport number; in the right hand circle is the Hong Kong regional flag (the red and white reverse gradually as the viewing angle is changed).

The Hong Kong permanent identity card number is printed at the bottom right hand side of the portrait photograph as a trapezium shape which gradually widens towards the bottom. The three waves at the bottom of the portrait photograph, as well as the straight line separating the machine readable zone from the rest of the data page and the vertical straight line of the right hand column of Tsing Ma Bridge, contains micro-lettering of the holder's English name, Hong Kong permanent identity card number and date of birth.

The background of the identification page changes under ultraviolet light, when a scene of the Tsing Ma Bridge with nighttime fireworks becomes visible. The identification page also contains an engraving of a bauhinia, but with certain lines replaced by microlettering consisting of "HKSAR".

==== Inner pages ====
All the inner pages have seasonal flowers at the side, and different "華" ("Chinese") characters in the centre. As well as being printed in red at the bottom of each page, the passport number is perforated through the top section of all the odd-numbered pages. At the bottom of each page is a gold outline of the Great Wall of China. The seasonal flower is printed across the middle of even-numbered and odd-numbered pages. When two pages are rolled up such that they meet each other, the seasonal flower on the right margin of the odd-numbered page matches up with the flower on the left margin of the even-numbered page (e.g. pages 11 and 14), forming a complete bouquet of flowers.

The observations page, located on page 1, contains a photograph of the holder. If the passport is issued through a Chinese foreign mission, the embassy/consulate will make an endorsement in the observations stating so.

The explanatory notes on the passport are placed on the second last page of the passport, and read as follows-

1. The issuance, replacement, reissuance and endorsement of this passport shall be effected by the Immigration Department of the Government of the Hong Kong Special Administrative Region of the People's Republic of China, diplomatic and consular missions of the People's Republic of China in foreign countries, or other Chinese authorities in foreign countries under the entrustment of the Ministry of Foreign Affairs of the People's Republic of China.
2. The bearer of this passport is a Chinese citizen who holds a Hong Kong permanent identity card (HKPIC) and has the right of abode in and the right to return to the Hong Kong Special Administrative Region.
3. This passport is valid for ten years, unless otherwise stated. This passport is normally valid for five years if issued to a child under sixteen years of age. This passport shall be replaced by a new one when its validity period has expired or it has no further space for visas.
4. This passport is an important document of identity which shall be kept carefully and used properly. It shall not be mutilated, tampered with, or transferred to another person for unlawful use. Any case of loss or destruction should be immediately reported to the nearest issuing authority and the local police or public security authorities.

The last page of the passport has a section to be filled in by the holder with contact information in the event of an emergency, as well as a space for the holder to complete his/her signature.

==== Contactless biometric data chip ====
Data included in the contactless chip of the passport:

- Name in Chinese and English
- Nationality (i.e. Chinese)
- Sex
- Date of birth
- Place of birth
- Permanent Hong Kong identity card number
- Facial image
- Passport number
- Date of issue
- Date of expiry
- Issuing authority (i.e. Immigration Department, Hong Kong Special Administrative Region)

Fingerprints and iris scans are not included.

The explanation from back cover for the chip is as follows:

本護照含敏感的電子部件，為保持護照的最佳效能，請勿彎曲護照或在本頁打孔；切勿讓本護照接觸高低溫或受潮。

This passport contains sensitive electronics. For the best performance please do not bend, perforate this page or expose this passport to extreme temperatures or excess moisture.

請勿在此蓋印

Do not stamp here

=== Fourth version (2019–) ===
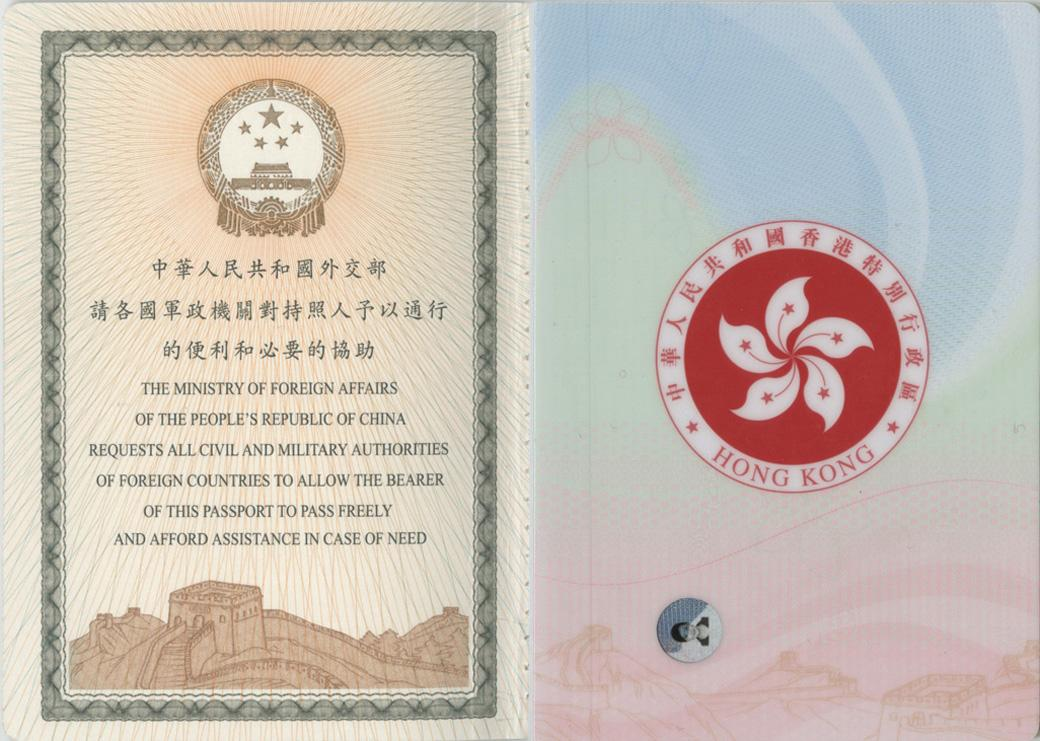
Inner front cover of the Fourth Version Hong Kong SAR passport

From May 14, 2019, the fourth version passport has been issued. Like the third version, it is an electronic passport, and at least 8 new anti-counterfeiting features have been added to increase the difficulty of making false certificates. The main differences from the previous passport are as follows:

- The background color of the Hong Kong Special Administrative Region emblem on the back of the Personal Data Page has been changed to a gradient multi-color pattern.
- The theme design of the Personal Data Page has been changed from the Tsing Ma Bridge to the Hong Kong Convention and Exhibition Centre and Golden Bauhinia Square, with the addition of the national flag of the People's Republic of China and the regional flag of the Hong Kong Special Administrative Region.
- A small photograph of the holder has been added to the Personal Data Page, etched within a transparent window.
- Dynamic printing has been added to the Personal Data Page, with the words "Hong Kong" and "HK" alternating when viewed from different angles.
- The microprinted personal data below the holder's photo on the Personal Data Page has been changed from a wavy pattern to a Lion Rock pattern.
- The night views of the Tsing Ma Bridge and Kap Shui Mun Bridge can be seen under ultraviolet light on the Personal Data Page.
- The background color of the inner pages of the passport has been changed from a gradient of yellow and green to a four-color rotation of blue, red, green, and yellow, with the addition of a butterfly pattern. By placing pages with the same background color together and holding them under ultraviolet light, a picture of Victoria Harbour can be pieced together.
- The notes page features a photo of the passport holder in micro-printed personal information, changing from black and white to color.
- To accommodate the needs of visually impaired individuals, upon request, the passport number and expiration date can be printed in Braille on the back of the "Personal Information Page" to facilitate identification. The rest of the passport remains the same as a regular passport.
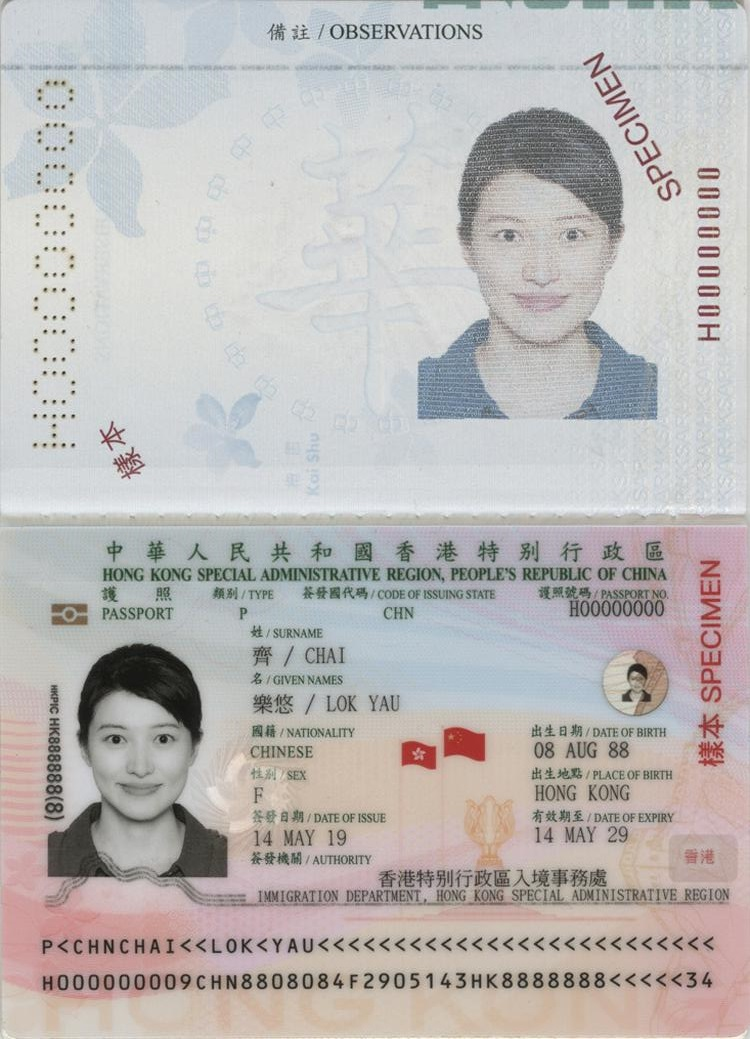
Identification page of the Fourth Version Hong Kong SAR passport

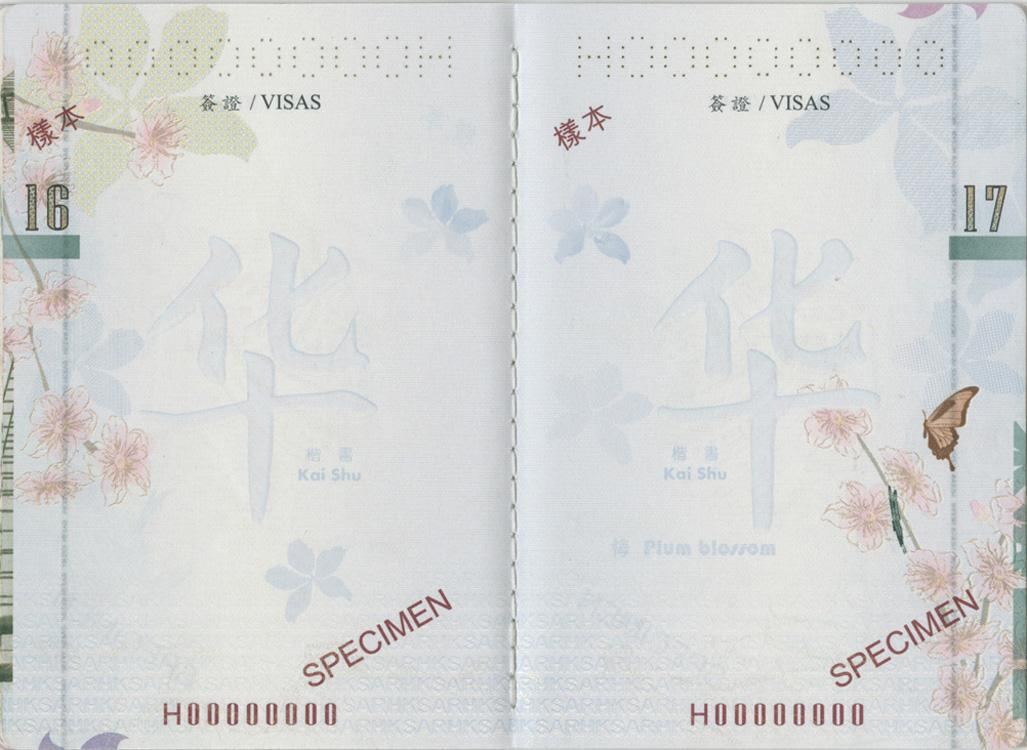
Visa pages of the Fourth Version Hong Kong SAR passport

== Eligibility and application ==
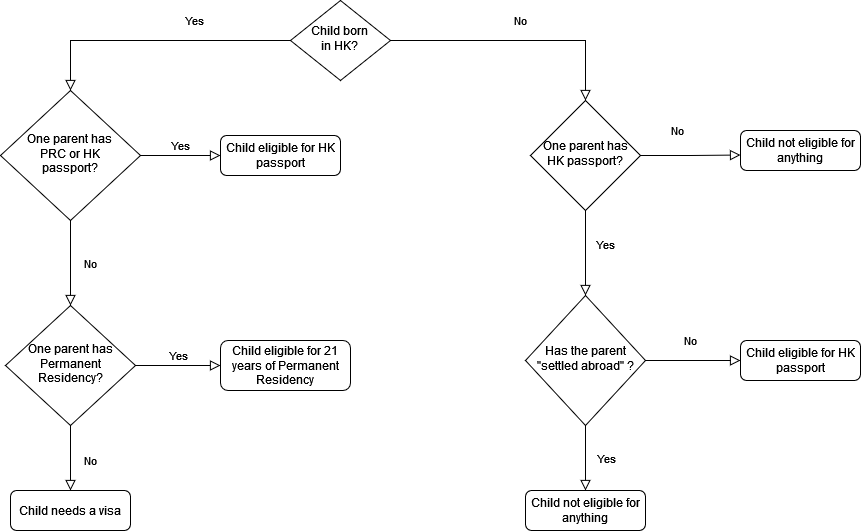
Flowchart to determine eligibility

The eligibility criteria for application for a Hong Kong SAR passport are as follows:

- Chinese citizenship;
- Permanent residency in the Hong Kong SAR, and;
- A valid Hong Kong permanent identity card.

In comparison with the British National (Overseas) passport, the Hong Kong SAR passport's application fees are lower. When applying in Hong Kong, a British National (Overseas) passport costs £83 (32 pages), and £53 (child) from April 2014. In comparison with other Chinese passports, when applying from Hong Kong, the People's Republic of China passport costs HK$250, whilst the Macao SAR passport costs MOP$370/HK$359.

Hong Kong permanent residents without Chinese citizenship cannot be issued HKSAR passports and must obtain passports from their country of origin, or they may obtain a Hong Kong Document of Identity for Visa Purposes if they are stateless.

Chinese citizens residing in Hong Kong who are not yet Hong Kong permanent residents are not eligible for a HKSAR passport but may also obtain a Hong Kong Document of Identity in lieu of a HKSAR passport.

Chinese Nationality Law does not recognize dual citizenship, however the Standing Committee of the National People's Congress has given explanations concerning the implementation of the Chinese Nationality Law in the Hong Kong Special Administrative Region. This "explanation" allows for HKSAR passport holders to hold the passport of another country without risk of losing their Chinese nationality. That passport however is not recognized while in Hong Kong and holders are treated as Chinese nationals without any expectation of consular protection.

== Use ==
=== Mainland China ===
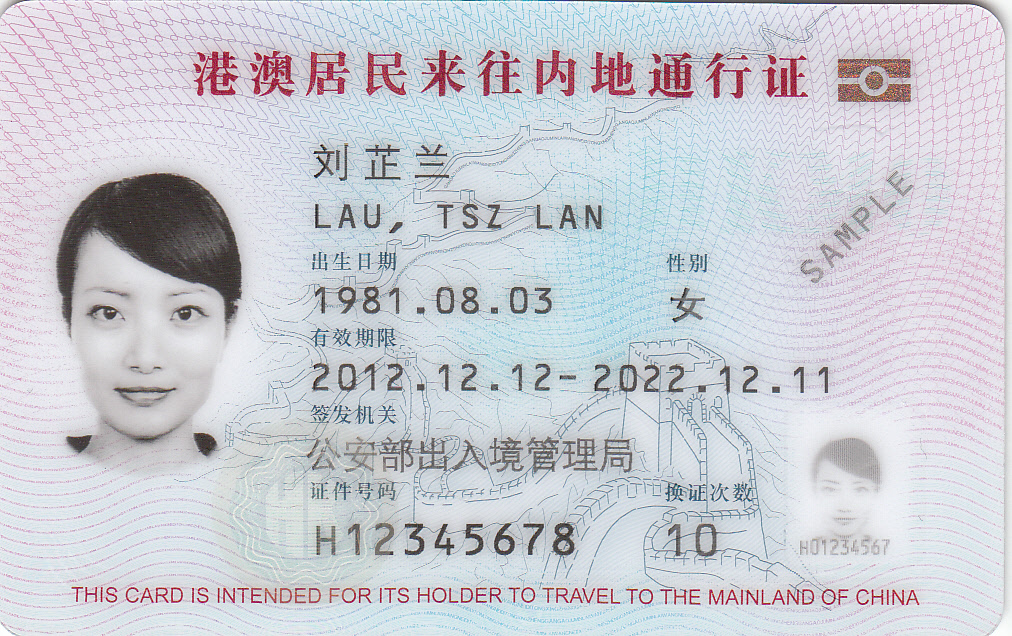
Newer version of Home Return Permit.

The Ministry of Public Security does not allow Hong Kong permanent residents to travel to the mainland with SAR passports, since both mainland and Hong Kong authorities have agreed that using passport is 'unnecessary and inappropriate' for 'domestic' travel. Instead, those who are eligible for a Hong Kong SAR passport are also eligible to apply for a Home Return Permit via the Bureau of Exit and Entry Administration of the Ministry of Public Security (represented in Hong Kong by the China Travel Service). The possession of a Hong Kong SAR passport does not guarantee the issuing of a Home Return Permit; several pro-democracy advocates, for example, have been refused Home Return Permits or had their permits confiscated.

Hong Kong residents who do not have a Home Return Permit or who want to travel to the mainland from a third country must obtain a Chinese Travel Document prior to travel.

=== Macau ===
Regardless of their citizenship status, Hong Kong permanent residents do not need passports to travel to Macau. However, those residents must bring their Hong Kong permanent identity cards which grant a 1-year visa-free entry. Non-permanent residents can use a Hong Kong Document of Identity for Visa Purposes to enter Macau for up to 30 days visa-free.

When Hong Kong residents travel abroad via Macau, such residents can use their HKSAR passports to enter Macau and stay 7 days visa-free.

Hong Kong SAR permanent residents may use the "Contactless e-Channel" mobile application's QR Code for e-Channel entry into Macau, though carrying their physical Hong Kong identity cards remains a requirement when crossing the border. Eligibility for this service requires individuals to be aged 11 or above, hold a valid Hong Kong permanent identity card, and have successfully enrolled for e-Channel service in the Macau SAR.

=== Taiwan ===
Hong Kong SAR passport holders who have either visited Taiwan previously or who were born in Hong Kong or Macau are able to obtain a 30-day entry permit online at the website of the National Immigration Agency which can be used for a single entry to Taiwan within three months of the application date. Once the permit has been granted online, the applicant must print it out to be presented at the border checkpoint with a Hong Kong SAR passport with at least 6 months' validity and a return flight/ferry ticket.

Hong Kong SAR passport holders can also obtain a 30-day entry permit upon arrival in Taiwan at the border checkpoint on presentation of their Hong Kong Permanent Identity Card as well as their Hong Kong SAR or British National (Overseas) passport, as long as they were born in Hong Kong. A fee of NT$300 is incurred for each application.

Alternatively, they can apply for an entry permit in advance through Taipei Economic and Cultural Office in Hong Kong at a cost of HK$75, which is valid for 3 months from the date of issuance, permitting the holder to enter Taiwan twice, each time for a maximum stay of 30 days.

=== Overseas ===
Visa requirements for Chinese citizens of Hong Kong Hong Kong Mainland Travel Permit travel Visa not required Visa on arrival or eVisa eVisa Visa required

According to the Hong Kong Immigration Department, as of August 2026, 178 countries and territories grant Hong Kong SAR passport holders either visa-free or visa-on-arrival access (Note: this figure excludes countries and territories not officially recognised by the People's Republic of China, e.g. Kosovo and Taiwan), including all member states of the European Union, Brazil, Canada, Chile, Japan, Malaysia, New Zealand, Russia, Singapore, South Africa and South Korea. According to the Henley Passport Index, as of September 2026, the Hong Kong SAR passport was ranked as the 13th most powerful passport worldwide, tied with Cyprus; in contrast, the Macau SAR passport was ranked 31st, while the PRC passport was ranked 61st. Surprisingly, the Hong Kong SAR passport is the only passport that can enter Yemen with visa-free treatment.

With regards to Schengen Agreement signatory states, Hong Kong SAR passport holders are also permitted to take up a paid activity (e.g. work) visa-free for a maximum of 90 days within a 180-day period in Belgium, Denmark, Iceland, Lithuania, Luxembourg, the Netherlands, Norway, Slovenia and Sweden. In Switzerland, another Schengen signatory state, Hong Kong SAR passport holders are able to exercise a "gainful occupation" for a maximum of 8 days during their 90 days visa-exempt stay without the need to apply for a special work visa. However, this 8-day visa exemption excludes gainful occupation in the primary or secondary construction industry, civil engineering, catering and hotel services, industrial and private cleaning industry, surveillance and security services and sex industry. Alternatively, if in possession of a long term residence permit issued by any other Schengen member state, the Hong Kong SAR passport holder can exercise a gainful occupation for up to 3 months visa-free in Switzerland (without the industry-specific restrictions listed in the 8-day visa exemption).

As Chinese citizens, those travelling on Hong Kong SAR passports are entitled to the consular protection offered by the People's Republic of China government while overseas. However, it is not uncommon for PRC authorities overseas to refuse consular assistance to PRC citizens of Hong Kong origin travelling on their British National (Overseas) passports, as their British nationality is not recognised by the Chinese government. See also British consular protection enjoyed by BN(O) passport holders outside the PRC and the UK.

Hong Kong SAR passport holders are also able to enjoy travel convenience under some bilateral agreements concluded between the PRC and other countries (on PRC passports in general). For example, holders of PRC passport and that of HKSAR passport are exempt from the fee for Nepalese tourist visas.

On 10 April 2013, the Prime Minister of Australia, Julia Gillard, announced that, starting from 2015, holders of Hong Kong SAR e-passports would be able to use SmartGates in Australia on a trial basis. The trial period started in September 2015. Since June 2016, Hong Kong e-passport holders are eligible to use smartgates in Australia.

==== Visa waiver reciprocity ====
In some cases, Hong Kong SAR passport holders are subject to visa requirements to countries whose nationals can enter Hong Kong visa-free. For example, American and Indian nationals can enter Hong Kong visa-free for a maximum period of 90 and 14 days respectively, though Hong Kong SAR passport holders are required to apply for a visa for any visit to the United States or India. Other countries such as Paraguay and Costa Rica also require visas for any visits, despite nationals from these countries entering Hong Kong visa free.

Also, Hong Kong SAR passport holders may be given less favourable visa-free conditions by certain countries, compared to the conditions offered by Hong Kong to those countries' nationals.

Conversely, in some situations, Hong Kong SAR passport holders enjoy better visa waiver conditions to countries whose nationals are subject to stricter conditions entering Hong Kong. Hong Kong SAR passport holders enjoy a visa-free stay of up to 90 days to Bosnia and Herzegovina, Macedonia and Rwanda, although nationals of these countries are only granted a maximum visa-free stay of 14 days in Hong Kong.

In some cases, Hong Kong SAR passport holders are offered visa-free access to countries whose nationals are unable to travel to Hong Kong visa-free for any length of time. An example is Nicaragua, to which Hong Kong SAR passport holders can travel visa-free for a maximum period of 90 days. However, Nicaraguans must apply for a visa to travel to Hong Kong.

==== Comparison of visa-free access ====
The Hong Kong Immigration Department cites the number of countries and territories offering visa-free access for Hong Kong SAR passport holders as 173 (this figure excludes countries and territories not officially recognised by the People's Republic of China, e.g. Kosovo and Taiwan). The British Consulate-General in Hong Kong states 119 as the number of countries and territories providing visa-free access to British National (Overseas) passport holders.

Hong Kong residents staying in the United Kingdom for 6 months or more and entering on a British National (Overseas) passport are exempt from having to register with the police, whilst entry on a Hong Kong SAR passport does not exempt them from this administrative procedure, with a police registration fee of £34 payable. In this sense, Hong Kong SAR passports are treated in the same way as ordinary Chinese passports. For travel to Dominica, Grenada and Morocco, entry on a British National (Overseas) passport permits a longer visa-free stay than on a HKSAR passport – 6 months compared to 21 days, 6 months compared to 3 months, and 3 months compared to 30 days respectively. Whilst entry on a HKSAR passport to Nauru requires a visa to be obtained in advance, a BN(O) passport holder can obtain a 30-day visa on arrival free of charge.

However, Hong Kong SAR passport holders enjoy better visa-free access to Australia than British National (Overseas) passports. Whilst both passports are eligible for the Electronic Travel Authority scheme, BN(O) passport holders can only apply for an ETA in person at an Australian visa office or through a travel agent/airline, whilst Hong Kong SAR passport holders can apply online at the ETA official website. Entry to Indonesia on a HKSAR passport permits a visa-free stay of 30 days whilst on a BN(O) passport a 30-day visa must be purchased on arrival at a cost of US$25. Similarly, HKSAR passport holders are eligible to obtain a visa on arrival in Lebanon and the United Arab Emirates, whilst BN(O) passport holders are ineligible.

Due to the international status of Hong Kong and British National (Overseas), both HKSAR passports and BN(O) passports are ineligible for Visa Waiver Program of the United States, and required to obtain a visa prior to travelling to the United States. However, HKSAR passport holders may travel to Guam and Northern Mariana Islands visa-free for 45 days.

In comparison with other Chinese passports, the Hong Kong SAR passport provides considerably more visa-free access than the ordinary People's Republic of China passport, the Macao Special Administrative Region passport, and the Republic of China (Taiwan) passport.

==== Working holiday visas ====
As a result of bilateral working holiday visa agreements made between the Government of Hong Kong and a number of other countries, Hong Kong SAR passport holders aged between 18 and 30 are eligible to apply for working holiday visas to Australia, Canada, France, Germany, Ireland, Japan, New Zealand and South Korea. These visas allow their holders to spend a maximum of 12 months in the foreign country with the primary purpose of travelling, but also permitting supplementary short-term employment (and for some countries (e.g. South Korea), short-term study may in addition be allowed). On the basis of reciprocity, Australian, Canadian, French, German, Irish, Japanese, New Zealand and South Korean nationals are also able to apply for working holiday visas in Hong Kong under similar conditions.

HKSAR passport holders have been eligible for UK working holiday visas, subject to Certificate of Sponsorship and annual maximum of 1000 placements since January 2014. However, holders of a British National (Overseas) passport are not subject to any quotas nor Certificate of Sponsorship under the same Scheme and are able to work or study in the UK for 5 years as holders are granted limited leave to remain.

== Notable incidents ==
=== Lai Changxing incident ===
Lai Changxing, the suspect of a large smuggling and corruption scandal in mainland China, used a HKSAR passport to enter Canada as a tourist in 1999. His HKSAR passport and Hong Kong permanent residency were revoked by the Hong Kong Government in 2002 on the grounds that he had obtained the residency by dishonest means.

=== "Place of birth" in HKSAR passports ===
On 16 April 2008, the Court of First Instance of the High Court of the Hong Kong Special Administrative Region decided in open court to publicize the case of Aziz Akbar Butt v Director of Immigration (HCAL32-2007). Aziz Akbar Butt, born in Pakistan and a Hong Kong permanent resident who became a naturalised Chinese citizen of Hong Kong on 8 January 2007, argued that for HKSAR passport holders such as himself born outside the mainland China, Hong Kong or Macao, it was not necessary for the Director of Immigration to label their "place of birth" as stated in the HKSAR passport to be the country/state of birth specifically, with the city or province of birth sufficing. He further claimed to have problems travelling to several countries because his HKSAR passport stated "Pakistan" (i.e. his country of birth) instead of "Karachi" or "Sindh" (i.e. his specific place of birth within Pakistan) as his "place of birth". The Director of Immigration asserted that it was in accordance with HKSAR law and ICAO standards that one's "country of birth" should be specified for holders of the HKSAR passport born outside mainland China, Hong Kong and Macao.

The Court of First Instance of the High Court decided that the Director of Immigration was wrong in using a policy to insert the country of birth as the "place of birth" in the applicant's passport in this instance, given a passport's nature as a document ensuring freedom of travel and the lack of a specific requirement within ICAO standards for machine-readable passports to state one's country of birth specifically. As a result of this court decision, the Director of Immigration cancelled the passport previously issued to Butt, and replaced it with a new passport at no cost, with his place of birth stated as "Sindh".

== See also ==
- British nationality law and Hong Kong
- British National (Overseas) passport
- British Overseas Territories citizen
- Exit & Entry Permit
- Hong Kong Document of Identity for Visa Purposes
- Hong Kong Re-entry Permit
- Chinese nationality law
- Mainland Travel Permit for Hong Kong and Macao Residents
- Mainland Travel Permit for Taiwan Residents
- Macao Special Administrative Region passport
- Visa requirements for Chinese citizens of Hong Kong
