= Hong Kong identity card =

Official residents identity document

Hong Kong identity card 香港身份證
- The front of the fourth-generation Hong Kong permanent identity card

- The back of the fourth-generation Hong Kong permanent identity card (with the right of abode in Hong Kong)
- Type: Identity card
- Issued by: Hong Kong
- Purpose: Identification
- Valid in: Hong Kong; Macao (for max. 1 year for Hong Kong Permanent Resident); Albania (for max. 90 days); Montserrat (for max. 14 days)
- Eligibility: Residence in Hong Kong, person over 11 years of age
- Cost: Registration: free Renewal: free Replacement (lost, destroyed, damaged or defaced): HK$370; Replacement (alteration of particulars): HK$460

Hong Kong permanent identity card
- Traditional Chinese: 香港永久性居民身份證
- Simplified Chinese: 香港永久性居民身份证
- Cantonese Yale: Hēung góng wíhng gáu sing gēui màhn sān fán jing
Transcriptions
Standard Mandarin
- Hanyu Pinyin: Xiānggǎng yǒngjiǔxìng jūmín shēnfènzhèng
Yue: Cantonese
- Yale Romanization: Hēung góng wíhng gáu sing gēui màhn sān fán jing
- Jyutping: Hoeng1 gong2 wing5 gau2 sing3 goei1 man4 san1 fan2 zing3
- IPA: [hœ́ːŋ kɔ̌ːŋ we̬ŋ kɐ̌u sēŋ kɵ́y mɐ̏n sɐ́n fɐ̀n tsēŋ]

Hong Kong identity card
- Traditional Chinese: 香港身份證
- Simplified Chinese: 香港身份证
- Cantonese Yale: Hēung góng sān fán jing
Transcriptions
Standard Mandarin
- Hanyu Pinyin: Xiānggǎng shēnfènzhèng
Yue: Cantonese
- Yale Romanization: Hēung góng sān fán jing
- Jyutping: Hoeng1 gong2 san1 fan2 zing3
- IPA: [hœ́ːŋ kɔ̌ːŋ sɐ́n fɐ̀n tsēŋ]

The Hong Kong identity card (officially HKIC, commonly HKID) is an official identity document issued by the Immigration Department of Hong Kong. According to the Registration of Persons Ordinance (Cap. 177), all residents of age 11 or above who are living in Hong Kong for longer than 180 days must, within 30 days of either reaching the age of 11 or arriving in Hong Kong, register for an HKID. HKIDs contain amongst others the name of the bearer in English, and if applicable in Chinese. The HKID does not expire for the duration of residency in Hong Kong.

The Hong Kong permanent identity card is a class of HKID issued to Hong Kong residents who have the right of abode (ROA) in the Hong Kong Special Administrative Region. There are around 8.8 million Hong Kong identity cards in circulation.

The current HKID, named as the new smart identity card, features multiple security, durability and chip technology enhancements.

== History ==
The use of identity documents has a long history in Hong Kong, starting with manually filled paper documents, to the smart card introduced on 23 June 2003.

Before 1949, people could move freely into and out of Hong Kong (then a British colony), and China (then Republic of China). Hong Kong residents who held Republic of China citizenship were not registered. In 1949, when the Government of the Republic of China retreated to Taiwan and the People's Republic of China was established on the mainland, the Hong Kong Government began to register Hong Kong residents to issue compulsory identity documents. These measures were put into practice to manage the influx of migrants from China. The registration was completed in 1951. Although registration was compulsory for all residents, people were not required to carry their documents with them at all times when out in public.

Beginning on 1 June 1960, the government introduced the second generation of ID cards. These bore the holder's fingerprint and photograph, and an official stamp. The information was typed, and the card was laminated. Males had a blue card and females had a red card. The format of card was replaced in November 1973 with a card without fingerprints. The colour of the stamp identified and differentiated permanent residents (black) from non-permanent ones (green). New immigrants subsequently became known colloquially as "green stampers" (Chinese: 綠印客; Cantonese Yale: luhk yan haak).

From 24 October 1980, carrying an identity card in public areas and showing it when requested by a police or immigration officer became compulsory. This law was passed to control large numbers of illegal immigrants arriving in the territory. The government adopted a policy of deporting illegal immigrants within three days if they could not produce a valid ID card.

From March 1983, digitally processed identity cards were introduced to reduce forgery. This also simplified border controls. On 1 June 1987, the Immigration Department produced cards without the coat of arms of British Hong Kong, which would last through the handover on 1 July 1997. Following the handover the cards display a smaller seal of the Hong Kong Special Administrative Region in the back of the card. In 2003, the government began replacing the cards with smart ID cards in stages.

=== Hong Kong smart identity cards ===
On 23 June 2003, the Immigration Department of Hong Kong began issuing a new smart Identity card. The new cards contained an embedded microchip, which stored the bearer's information electronically. Previous HKIDs remained valid until the Executive Council, through the Secretary for Security, declared them invalid. In addition, existing holders of HKIDs were called to have their old-style HKIDs replaced by the new cards. Between August 2003 to 2007, all Hong Kong ID cards were replaced.

The introduction of smart identity cards was motivated partly to speed up processing at Hong Kong's Immigration checkpoints, especially with Shenzhen, China. In the latter checkpoint, an estimated 7,200 Hong Kong residents commuted daily to Shenzhen for work and 2,200 students from Shenzhen commuted to school in Hong Kong in 2002.

=== Hong Kong New smart identity cards ===
On 29 November 2017, the design of a new smart ID card was introduced. The card is equipped with built-in radio frequency identification, expanded storage for higher-resolution photo, hologram background, rainbow printing, and micro-printed text. It was designed to prevent counterfeiting.

On 27 December 2018, the Immigration Department started the replacement procedure for all existing smart identity cards under the Territory-wide Identity Card Replacement Exercise. The programme features 24 phases, from 2018 to 2023.

== Classes of HKID ==
There are two classes of Hong Kong identity card:

- Hong Kong permanent identity card (Chinese: 香港永久性居民身份證) – which states that the holder has the right of abode in the Hong Kong Special Administrative Region
- Hong Kong identity card (Chinese: 香港居民身份證) – which does not state that right.

The card types can be further divided into cards bearing the term "child" (below age 11 and not compulsory; the card can be requested to obtain later a passport with a Hong Kong permanent resident number), "youth" (from age 11 up until 18), and "adult" (issued from age 18 onwards).

=== Permanent HKID and right of abode ===
Permanent HKID holders have the Right of Abode (ROA) (Chinese: 居留權; Cantonese Yale: Gēuilàu kyùn) in Hong Kong. Under the Basic Law of Hong Kong, a person who belongs to one of the following categories is a permanent resident of the HKSAR with right of abode privileges:

1. Chinese citizen born in Hong Kong before or after the establishment of the HKSAR
2. Chinese citizen who has ordinarily resided in Hong Kong for a continuous period of not less than seven years before or after the establishment of the HKSAR.
3. Person of Chinese nationality born outside Hong Kong before or after the establishment of the HKSAR to a legal ascendant who, at the time of birth of that person, was a Chinese citizen falling within category (1) or (2).
4. Person not of Chinese nationality who has entered Hong Kong with a valid travel document, has ordinarily resided in Hong Kong for a continuous period of not less than seven years and has taken Hong Kong as his place of permanent residence before or after the establishment of the HKSAR.
5. Person under 21 years of age born in Hong Kong to a legal ascendant who is a permanent resident of the HKSAR in category (4) before or after the establishment of the HKSAR if at the time of his birth or at any later time before he attains 21 years of age, one of his legal ascendant(s) has the ROA in Hong Kong.
6. Person other than those residents in categories (1) to (5), who, before the establishment of the HKSAR, had the ROA in Hong Kong only.

Paper versions of the Hong Kong Identity card (such as the one on the right) are issued by the Registration of Persons Office for temporary use until a smart card can be manufactured. This process requires two weeks, and the smart card must be collected within six weeks.

=== Hong Kong identity card ===
All Hong Kong residents aged 11 or over must register for an identity card.

== Eligibility ==
Residents of Hong Kong are required to obtain an HKID card at the age of 11. Hong Kong residents over age 15 are required to carry legal identification with them at all times (that is, the HKID card). Bearers of a "youth" HKID card must switch to an "adult" HKID within 30 days after their 18th birthday. The "youth" card will be invalid as re-entry travel document 30 days after the 18th birthday.

Photographs are not required on HKIDs for children under the age of 11 and cannot be used as travel documents. A Hong Kong Re-entry Permit is issued in its place. Alternatively, children may use their HKSAR passport as a travel document to enter and exit Hong Kong.

== Meaning of symbols on ID card ==
A Hong Kong ID card bears a number of symbols in Roman letters under the date of birth (for example: ***AZ, AO, CO). Up until the issue of Smart ID cards, which were issued commencing from 2003, the sex of the holder was also shown in the codes under the date of birth (for example ***AFZ, AMO, CFO). It is now shown next to the left of the date of birth, so the codes under the date of birth do not include M or F.

The symbols have the following meaning:

Code	Explanation
Section 1
***	The holder is aged 18 or over and is eligible for a Hong Kong Re-entry Permit
*	The holder is aged between 11 and 17 and is eligible for a Hong Kong Re-entry Permit
A	The holder has the right of abode in Hong Kong
B	The holder's reported date of birth or place of birth has been changed since first registration.
C	The holder's stay in the HKSAR is limited by the Director of Immigration at the time of registration of the card.
N	The holder's reported name has been changed since first registration. (This can include the addition of a Chinese name.)
O	The holder was born outside, Hong Kong, the Mainland of China or Macau
R	The holder has the right to land in the HKSAR.
U	The holder's stay in the HKSAR is not limited by the Director of Immigration at the time of registration
W	The holder's reported place of birth is Macau
X	The holder's reported place of birth is the Mainland of China
Y	The holder's date of birth has been confirmed by the Director of Immigration against his/her birth certificate or passport
Z	The holder's reported place of birth is Hong Kong
Section 2
H1, K2, S1, P1, V1 etc.	Codes for the office issuing the card
L	The holder has lost his/her ID card. L1 indicated lost once, L2 indicated lost twice and so on.

== HKID number ==
HKID cards contain the bearer's HKID number, of which the standard format is X123456(A). X represents any one or two letters of the alphabet. The meaning of each initial letter is explained in the table below. The numerals may represent any Arabic number.

A is the check digit which has 11 possible values from 0 to 9 and A. There are 26 million possible card numbers using only the one-letter prefix, and 676 million using a two-letter prefix. The ID numbers of deceased persons are not reused. The check digit in brackets is not part of the identity card number, but appended solely to facilitate computer data processing.

Infants are not issued HKIDs but birth certificates have been issued with the holder's ID number since 1 January 1980.

As of the year 2023, there are no single letter HKIDs that begin with the letters: "I", "O", "Q", "U", "X" (There are double letters begin with "X").

=== Meaning of first letter(s) ===
Letter	Explanation
Single letter
A	Original ID cards, issued between 1949 and 1962, most holders were born before 1950
B	Issued between 1955 and 1960 in city offices
C	Issued between 1960 and 1983 in NT offices, if a child most born between 1946 and 1971, principally HK born
D	Issued between 1960 and 1983 at HK Island office, if a child most born between, principally HK born
E	Issued between 1955 and 1969 in Kowloon offices, if a child most born between 1946 and 1962, principally HK born
F	First issue of a card commencing from 24 February 2020
G	Issued between 1967 and 1983 in Kowloon offices, if a child most born between 1956 and 1971
H	Issued between 1979 and 1983 in HK Island offices, if a child most born between 1968 and 1971, principally HK born
J	Consular officers
K	First issue of an ID card between 28 March 1983 and 31 July 1990, if a child most born between 1972 and 1979
L	Issued between 1983 and 2003, used when computer system malfunctioned. It started to be used again for people first registered on 27 July 2026 and who were born outside of Hong Kong.
M	First issue of ID card between 1 August 2011 and 23 February 2020
N	Birth registered in Hong Kong after 1 June 2019
P	First issue of an ID card between 1 August 1990 and 27 December 2000, if a child most born between July and December 1979
R	First issue of an ID card between 28 December 2000 and 31 July 2011
S	Birth registered in Hong Kong between 1 April 2005 and 31 May 2019
T	Issued between 1983 and 1997, used when computer system malfunctioned, very few people hold
V	Child under 11 issued with a "Document of Identity for Visa Purposes" between 28 March 1983 and 31 August 2003
W	First issue to a foreign labourer or foreign domestic helper between 10 November 1989 and 1 January 2009
Y	Birth registered in Hong Kong between 1 January 1989 and 31 March 2005
Z	Birth registered in Hong Kong between 1 January 1980 and 31 December 1988
Double letters
EC	Issued between 1993 and 2003, for European Community officers in Hong Kong (and dependents)
WX	First issue to a foreign labourer or foreign domestic helper since 2 January 2009
XA / XB / XC / XD / XE / XG / XH	ID card issues to person without a Chinese name before 27 March 1983

== Physical appearance ==
=== First and second-generation computerised HKID ===
First generation of the computerised HKID.

Second generation of the computerised HKID.

- Name in Chinese (if any)
- Name in English
- Name in Chinese Commercial Code (if any)
- Sex
- Date of birth (DD-MM-YYYY)
- Symbols
- Holder's digital image
- Month and year of first registration
- Date of registration
- Date of expiry (first-generation computerised Hong Kong ID card only)
- Identity card number (Note)

Notes and codes on the card

Symbol	Description
***	the holder is of the age of 18 or over and is eligible for a Hong Kong (S. A. R.) Re-entry Permit.
*	the holder is between the age of 11 and 17 and is eligible for a Hong Kong (S. A. R.) Re-entry Permit.
A	the holder has the right of abode in (the) Hong Kong (S. A. R.).
B	the holder's place of birth, date of birth or gender has been changed since his/ her first registration.
C	the holder's stay in (the) Hong Kong (S. A. R.) is limited by the Director of Immigration at the time of his registration of the card.
F	the holder is a female.
H1	code of ID card issuing office
K2	code of ID card issuing office
L	the holder has lost his/ her ID card once or more since his/ her first registration; 'L1' means he/ she has lost his/ her ID card once, 'L2' means twice, and so on..
M	the holder is a male.
R	the holder has a right to land in (the) Hong Kong (S. A. R.).
S1	code of ID card issuing office
U	the holder's stay in (the) Hong Kong (S. A. R.) is not limited by the Director of Immigration at the time of his registration of the card.
Y	the Immigration Department has verified the holder's reported date of birth by his/ her birth certificate or passport.
Z	the holder's place of birth reported is Hong Kong.
X	the holder's place of birth reported is the Mainland (mainland China).
W	the holder's place of birth reported is the region of Macau.
O	the holder's place of birth reported is in other countries.
N	the holder's name has been changed since his/ her first registration.

The other difference between the first and second generation cards is the replacement of the coat of arms from the back, which was done to remove any colonial features in preparation for the handover in 1997.

The front of the third generation smart identity card.

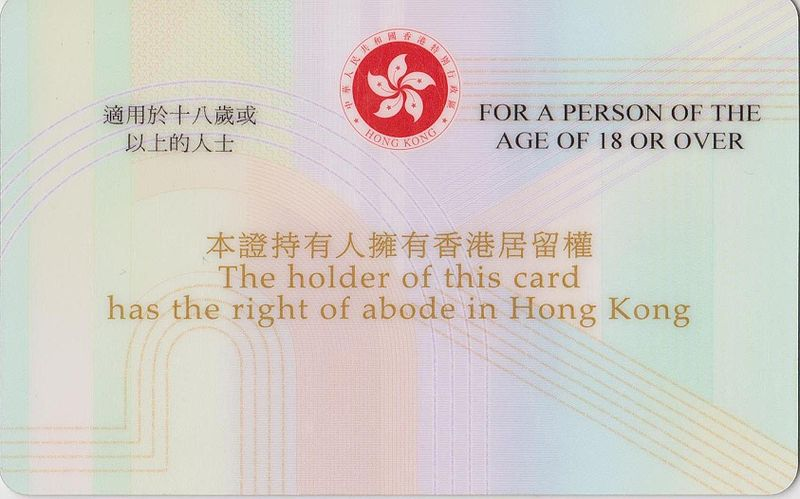
The back of the third generation smart identity card.

=== Third and Fourth generation smart HKID ===
- Name in Chinese (if any)
- Name in English
- Name in Chinese Commercial Code (if any)
- Date of birth (DD-MM-YYYY)
- Sex
- Symbols
- Holder's digital image
- Month and year of first registration
- Date of (this) registration
- Identity card number

Notes and codes on the card

Symbol	Description
***	the holder is of the age of 18 or over and is eligible for a Hong Kong (S. A. R.) Re-entry Permit.
*	the holder is between the age of 11 and 17 and is eligible for a Hong Kong (S. A. R.) Re-entry Permit.
A	the holder has the right of abode in (the) Hong Kong (S. A. R.).
C	the holder's stay in (the) Hong Kong (S. A. R.) is limited by the Director of Immigration at the time of his registration of the card.
R	the holder has a right to land in (the) Hong Kong (S. A. R.).
U	the holder's stay in (the) Hong Kong (S. A. R.) is not limited by the Director of Immigration at the time of his registration of the card.
Z	the holder's place of birth reported is Hong Kong.
X	the holder's place of birth reported is the Mainland (mainland China).
W	the holder's place of birth reported is the region of Macau.
O	the holder's place of birth reported is in other countries.
B	the holder's place of birth or date of birth has been changed since their first registration.
N	the holder's name has been changed since their first registration.

== Names in Chinese and Roman script ==
It is common for Chinese Hong Kongers to adopt western-style English names (such as John, Mary, etc.), in addition to their phonetic English names, after being registered on the birth register. Some of them may wish to include their western-style English name as part of their official English name (this is known as 'adding an English name' locally). They can apply to the Immigration Department for adding an English name (example: someone named 'Tai Ming CHAN' may have adopted a Western-style English name Peter and wish to have this name shown as 'Peter Tai Ming CHAN' ('Peter' as a first name) or 'Tai Ming Peter CHAN' ('Peter' as a middle name)) on his HKID card and the government's records. This is not considered by the Immigration Department as a name change. The Immigration Department considers that his or her original name (in the format of 'Tai Ming CHAN') is an alias, and that the newly lodged name (usually in the format of 'Peter Tai Ming CHAN' or 'Tai Ming Peter CHAN' or CHAN Tai Ming, Peter) is the proper name of the applicant (in the sense that such name is the 'proper name' of the applicant). A legal hangover from the former British administration is that the English transliteration of a person's Chinese name is their official legal name, and not their name in Chinese characters as would be expected.

Normally, when non-ethnic Chinese register for their first HKID card, the space reserved for a Chinese name is automatically left blank by the Immigration Department. It is possible, however, to add a name in Chinese characters at any time through application to the Immigration Department. Where a non-ethnic Chinese person applies to add a name in Chinese characters after first registration, this is considered by the Immigration Department as a name change.

== Use as a travel document ==
The Hong Kong permanent identity card by itself can be used to travel to Macau, as long as the holder has the right of abode or the right to land in Hong Kong. The holder is able to stay for up to 1 year in Macau visa-free.

Albania also accepts the Hong Kong permanent identity card by itself for entry, for a stay of up to 90 days within 180 days.

Montserrat accepts HKID for stay no longer than 14 days. Montserratian authorities allow to enter with any proof of identity (even driving licence).

Some foreign territories require Hong Kong Special Administrative Region passport holders to present their HKID as well to benefit from a visa exemption scheme. These places include Guam and the Northern Mariana Islands. Only HKSAR passport holders who were not born in Hong Kong or Macau are required to possess HKID when entering Taiwan.

HKID holders who possess right of abode or right to land are automatically eligible to use the e-Channel when arriving at or departing from Hong Kong. The e-Channel is not available when using an HKSAR passport and the person must clear immigration at an inspection counter if he or she arrives at or depart from a port of entry without HKID. Non-permanent residents are also eligible if they hold a Hong Kong Document of Identity for Visa Purposes or if they are successfully registered for e-Channel.

== Replacement schedule ==
The Territory-wide Identity Card Replacement Exercise has ended. Eligible members of the public who have yet to apply for the new smart identity card should apply at the Registration of Persons - Kwun Tong Office, Immigration Headquarters, 61 Po Yap Road, Tseung Kwan O, New Territories. 3rd Floor of Administration Tower for registration service; or 1st Floor of Administration Tower for collection service. Nearest MTR station is Tseung Kwan O, using exit B1. On-site Identity Card Replacement Service will continuously be provided to residential care homes (RCHs) and persons with disabilities (PwDs) across the territory. The old form of the smart identity cards will be invalidated in 2025.

== See also ==
- Hong Kong Special Administrative Region passport
- Hong Kong Re-entry Permit
- Hong Kong Document of Identity for Visa Purposes
- Resident identity card used in the People's Republic of China
- Macau Resident Identity Card
- National Identification Card (Taiwan) used in Taiwan
