= Home Office travel document =

- Type: Travel document
- Issued by: United Kingdom
- Purpose: International travel document
- Eligibility: Alien resident of United Kingdom
- Expiration: 5 years

A Home Office travel document is any of four different international travel documents issued by the UK Border Agency exclusively to non-British citizens who are residents of the United Kingdom and are unable to obtain a national passport. It is usually valid for five years, or if the holder only has temporary permission to stay in the United Kingdom, the validity will be identical to the length of stay permitted.

== Types of documents ==
There are four types of British Home Office travel documents:

- A Refugee travel document (or 1951 Convention Travel Document) is issued to refugees.
- A Stateless person's travel document (or 1954 Convention Travel Document) is issued to people who are stateless.
- A Certificate of Travel is issued to people who cannot obtain a travel document from their country of citizenship.
- A One-way Travel Document (IS137) is valid for one single journey out of the United Kingdom.
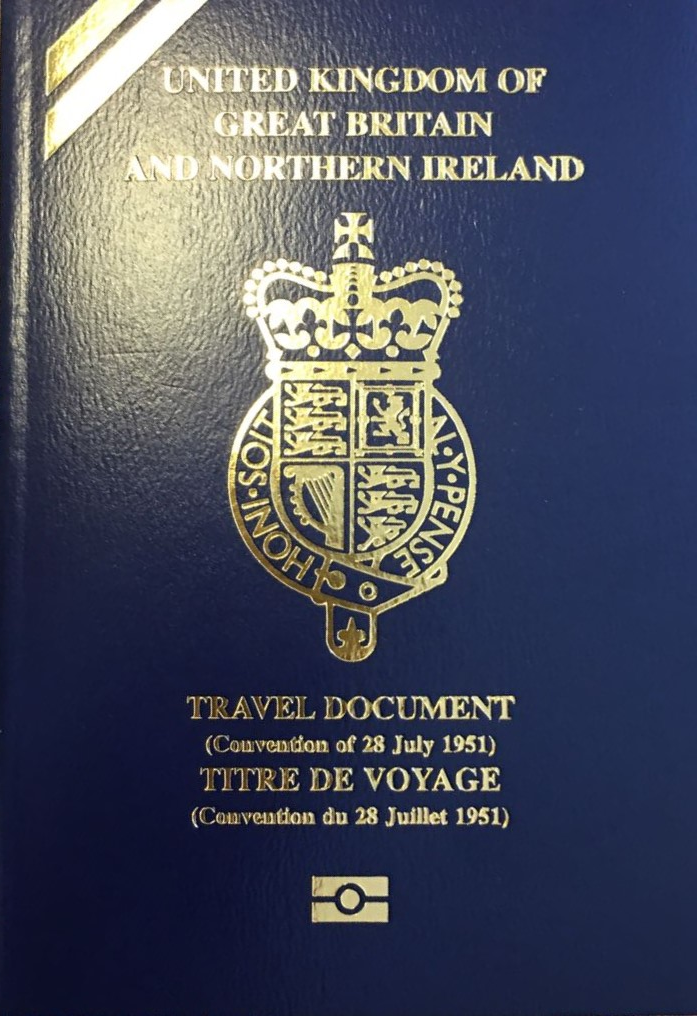
  A British Refugee travel document
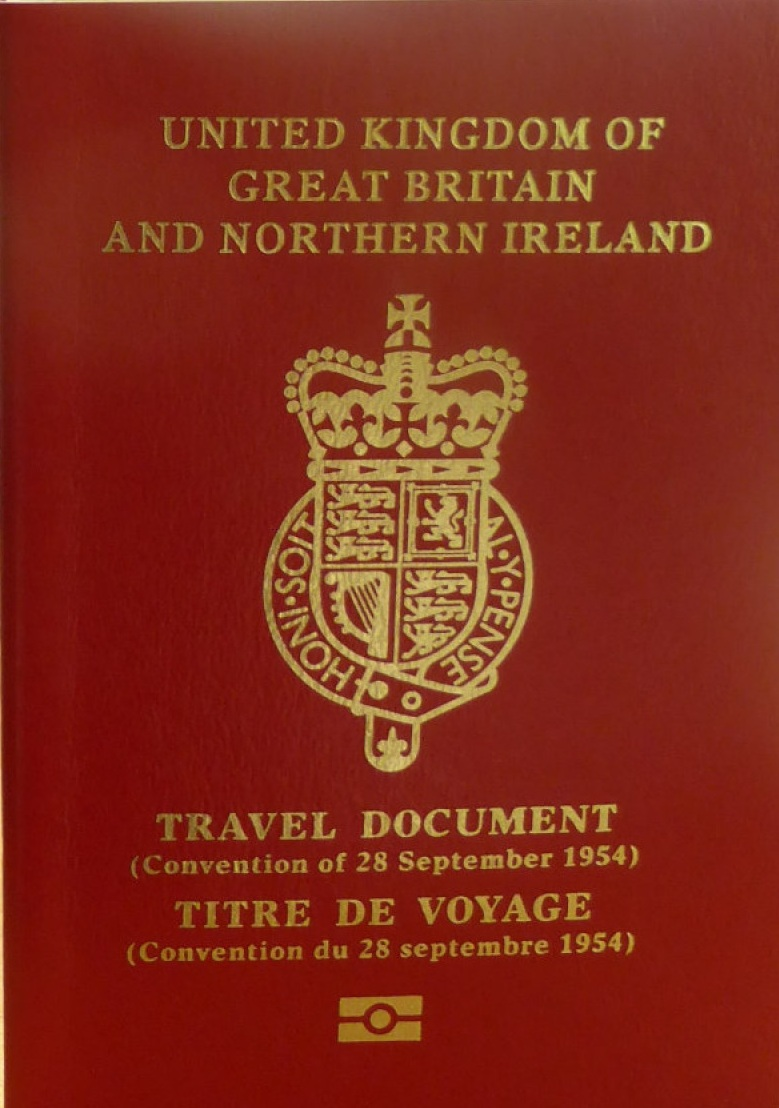
  British Travel document for stateless persons (1954 Convention Travel Document)
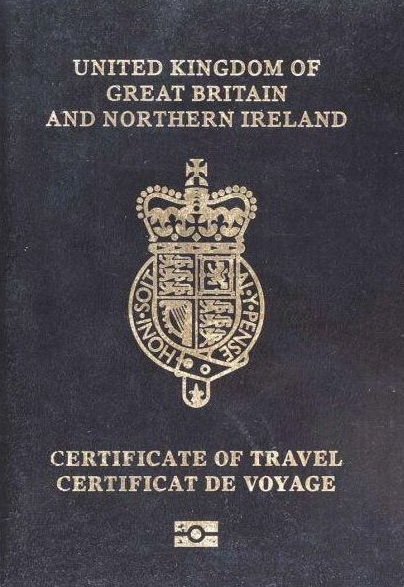
  A British Certificate of Travel, issued to non-British residents of the United Kingdom who do not qualify for either the Refugee's travel document or the Stateless person's travel document.

== Eligibility ==
The applicant must be:

1. either a recognised refugee or stateless individual, and
2. a permanent resident of the United Kingdom (e.g. by holding Indefinite Leave to Remain), or have previously been refused asylum but given exceptional leave to enter or remain, discretionary leave to remain, or humanitarian protection in the United Kingdom.

== Countries which do not recognise the travel documents ==
The British Certificate of Travel is not accepted by Qatar or the United Arab Emirates.
