= Macao Special Administrative Region Travel Permit =

Biometric international travel document

- The front cover of a contemporary Macao Special Administrative Region Travel Permit
- Type: Travel document
- Issued by: Macao
- Purpose: International travel document
- Eligibility: Non-permanent residents of Macao SAR holding Chinese nationality
- Expiration: 5 years after acquisition

The Macao Special Administrative Region Travel Permit (Portuguese: Título de Viagem da Região Administrativa Especial de Macau, Chinese: 澳門特別行政區旅行證) is a biometric international travel document issued to non-permanent residents of Macao SAR holding Chinese nationality, who also possess a Macao SAR Non-Permanent Resident Identity Card, and are not eligible for any other type of travel document. Permanent residents of Macao of non-Chinese nationality are also eligible.

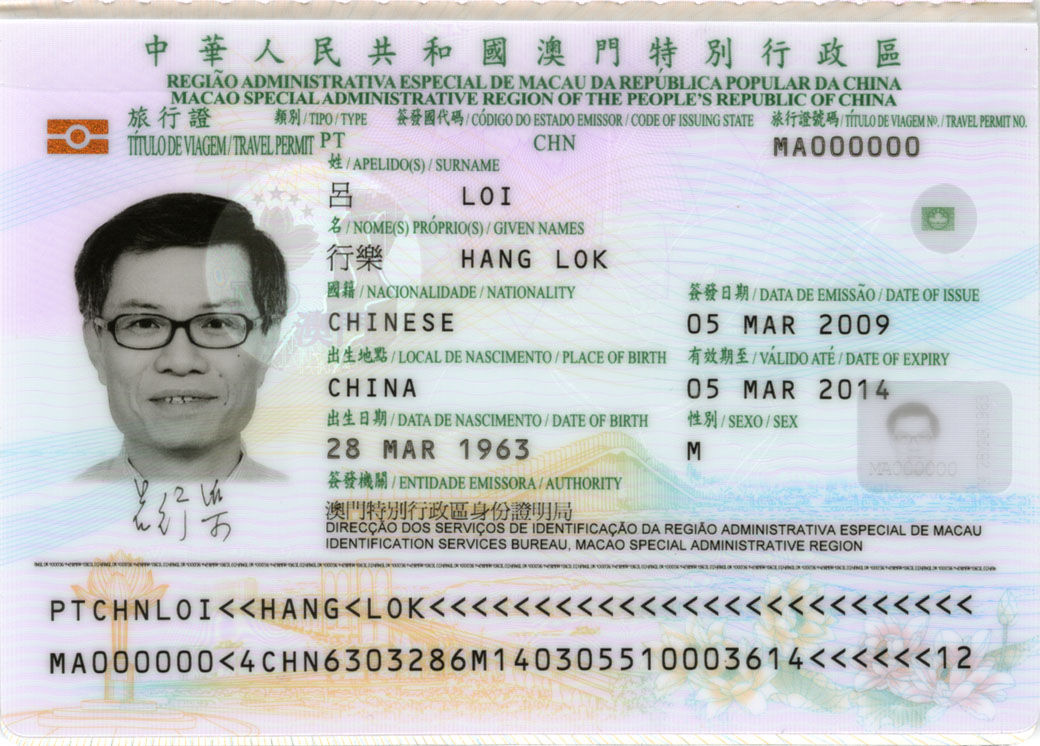
Biodata page

== Use ==
As of April 2016, 13 foreign countries which offer visa-free access to Macao SAR passport holders confer the same privilege to holders of the Macao SAR Travel Permit.

However, recognised refugees and stateless individuals who only possess a Macao SAR Travel Permit can enter Germany and Hungary visa-free for a maximum of 90 days out of a 180-day period. In the case of Germany, for recognised refugees to enter visa-free, their Document of Identity must be endorsed and issued under the terms of the Agreement of 15 October 1946 regarding the issue of travel documents to refugees, the Convention relating to the Status of Refugees of 28 July 1951 or the Convention relating to the Status of Stateless Persons of 28 September 1954. This visa exemption does not apply to Chinese nationals who hold a MSAR Travel Permit since they are neither refugees nor stateless individuals.

If the holder of a Macao SAR Travel Permit is a school pupil who is an Annex I national (i.e. he/she is required to possess a visa for all stays in Schengen agreement states), he/she can nonetheless enter Malta, Poland, Slovakia and Sweden visa-free by virtue of Article 4(2) as long as he/she is travelling as part of a school trip led by a school teacher for a maximum of 90 days within a 180-day period. For entry into Sweden, the school pupil must be less than 18 years old. This visa exemption applies equally to any Annex I national holding a national passport who is resident in Macao (e.g. a Chinese citizen resident in Macao who holds a mainland China passport) who satisfies the above conditions.

Holders of the Macao SAR Travel Permit who are not Chinese nationals are not entitled to the consular protection offered by the People's Republic of China government while overseas. However, Chinese foreign missions are able to assist should a Travel Permit become lost or stolen whilst abroad.

== See also ==
- Macau Special Administrative Region passport
- Right of abode in Macau
- Macau Resident Identity Card
- Hong Kong Document of Identity for Visa Purposes
