= British consular protection for BN(O) passport holders =

The British Government asserts that British National (Overseas) passport holders enjoy the same level of consular service in third countries (outside the UK and PRC) as other British Nationals.

== Assurances ==
In 2000, the British Government asserted that "Cantonese-speaking staff at the British Consulate-General pay periodic visits to the 80 or so BN(O)s who are in prison in Thailand."

In 2005, the British Consulate-General in Hong Kong advertised for renewal of BN(O) passports in some magazines (e.g. HK Magazine) in Hong Kong, saying that "Travel with confidence on your BN(O) passport. Reliable. Secure. And renewable for life."

The Government of the People's Republic of China (PRC) claimed that BN(O)s who were also PRC citizens can enjoy PRC consular protection in third countries even if they travelled on their BN(O) passports.

== Incidents ==
There have been instances that have cast some doubt regarding the availability of British consular protection for BN(O)s outside the UK and the PRC. In 1999, it was reported that a Hong Kong resident, who had travelled to India on his BN(O) passport had been wrongly detained for 23 days because his BN(O) passport was suspected by Indian officials to be fake and was certified as a forgery by the British High Commission in Bombay without seeking verification from the relevant authorities (British Consulate-General) in Hong Kong. However, he sought assistance from the PRC Embassy there and the BN(O) passport was verified by the British Consulate-General Hong Kong under pressure of the PRC Government. It was found that his BN(O) passport was genuine. Pursuant to this issue, the British authorities have upgraded all British passports regardless of type to include enhanced security features such as digitised photographs and signatures, and electronic security features that have made requests for verification by foreign immigration officers by the British Consulate-General in Hong Kong far less necessary/frequent.

In 1999 Wu Man, a British National (Overseas) and a Hong Kong resident, was alleged to be a member of the gang once led by Cheung Tze-keung. He was arrested by police in a Bangkok street. As the request of the Chinese Government Wu was sent to mainland China directly. No formal extradition hearing was held for him because, say the Thai authorities, "he didn't ask for it". They also claimed that Wu, went willingly to China. The British Foreign Office stated that it should have been informed of Wu's arrest and impending extradition. Wu, in turn, should have been able to seek British consular assistance in Bangkok. However, British Foreign Office Minister John Battle, claimed the Thai authorities had later promised it would not happen again.

== See also ==
- British nationality law and Hong Kong
- Chinese nationality law
