= Hong Kong resident =

Legal term

The Hong Kong Basic Law classifies residents of the Hong Kong Special Administrative Region (Chinese: 香港居民) as either permanent residents or non-permanent residents. Hong Kong residents have rights under the Basic Law including freedom of speech, freedom of movement and freedom of religious belief.

== Permanent Residents ==
Hong Kong permanent residents have the right of abode in Hong Kong and the right to vote in elections for the Legislative Council and the District Council. It is also the de facto citizenship status in Hong Kong because most citizen rights are associated with the right of abode. However, Hong Kong permanent residents are not entitled to a Hong Kong passport or stand for office in some Legislative Council constituencies, unless they are also naturalised Chinese citizens.

Under the Hong Kong Basic Law, permanent residents are:

1. Chinese citizens born in Hong Kong before or after the establishment of the Hong Kong Special Administrative Region;
2. Chinese citizens who have ordinarily resided in Hong Kong for a continuous period of not less than seven years before or after the establishment of the Hong Kong Special Administrative Region;
3. Persons of Chinese nationality born outside Hong Kong whose parents are permanent residents, listed in categories (1) and (2);
4. Persons not of Chinese nationality who have entered Hong Kong with valid travel documents, have ordinarily resided in Hong Kong for a continuous period of not less than seven years and have taken Hong Kong as their place of permanent residence before or after the establishment of the Hong Kong Special Administrative Region;
5. Persons under 21 years of age born in Hong Kong of those residents listed in category (4) before or after the establishment of the Hong Kong Special Administrative Region; and
6. Persons other than those residents listed in categories (1) to (5), who, before the establishment of the Hong Kong Special Administrative Region, had the right of abode in Hong Kong only.

The status of permanent resident was first introduced into Hong Kong law on 1 July 1987 when it replaced Hong Kong belonger status in the Hong Kong Immigration Ordinance Cap 115.

== Non-Permanent Residents ==
Non-permanent residents of Hong Kong are persons qualified to obtain Hong Kong identity cards (HKID) but have no right of abode. According to the Registration of Persons Ordinance (chapter 177 of the Laws of Hong Kong), all residents of age 11 or above who are living in Hong Kong for longer than 180 days must, within 30 days of either reaching the age of 11 or arriving in Hong Kong, register for an HKID.

Non-permanent residents do not qualify for a Hong Kong passport but can obtain a Document of Identity to travel if they are unable to obtain a national passport or travel document from any other country.
