= Hong Kong Document of Identity for Visa Purposes =

Travel document

Hong Kong Document of Identity for Visa Purposes 香港特別行政區簽證身份書
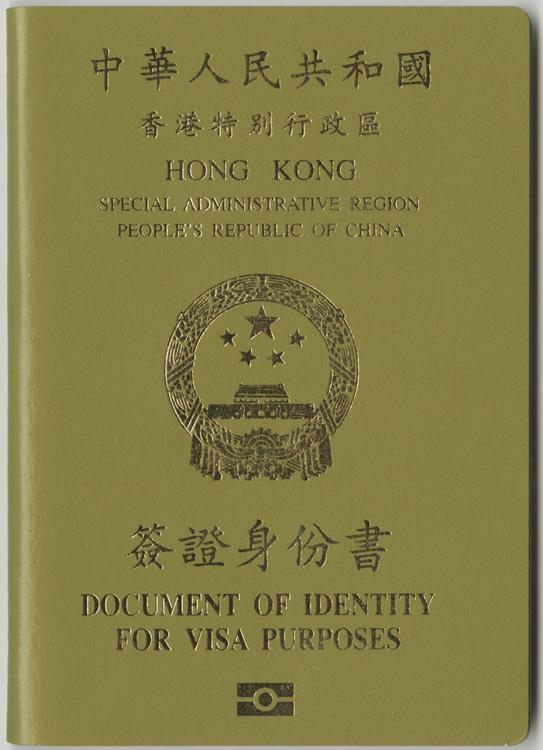
- The front cover of the Hong Kong Document of Identity for Visa Purposes

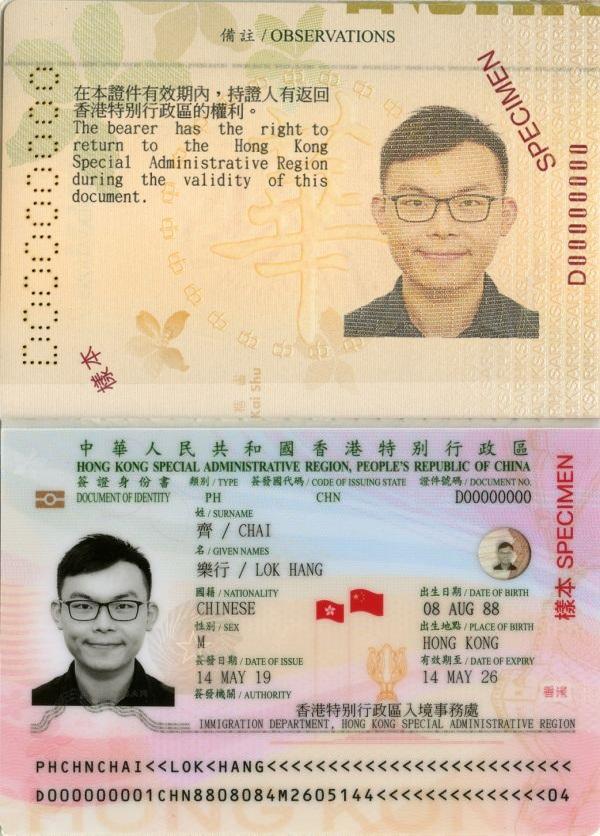
- Data page of the HKDI
- Type: Travel document
- Issued by: Hong Kong
- First issued: 1997
- Purpose: International travel document
- Eligibility: Residents of Hong Kong who are unable to obtain a national passport
- Expiration: 7 years
- Cost: 44 pages – HK$285; 92 pages – HK$370

Hong Kong Document of Identity for Visa Purposes
- Traditional Chinese: 香港特別行政區簽證身份書
- Simplified Chinese: 香港特别行政区签证身份书
- Literal meaning: Hong Kong Special Administrative Region visa identity document
Transcriptions
Standard Mandarin
- Hanyu Pinyin: Xiānggǎng Tèbié Xíngzhèngqū Qiānzhèng Shēnfènshū
- Bopomofo: ㄒㄧㄤ ㄍㄤˇ ㄊㄜˋ ㄅㄧㄝˊ ㄒㄧㄥˊ ㄓㄥˋ ㄑㄩ ㄑㄧㄢ ㄓㄥˋ ㄕㄣ ㄈㄣˋ ㄕㄨ
Yue: Cantonese
- Yale Romanization: Hēunggóng Dahkbiht Hàngjingkēui Chīmjing Sānfánsyū
- Jyutping: Hoeng1gong2 Dak6bit6 Hang4zing3keoi1 Cim1zing3 San1fan2syu1
- IPA: [hœ́ːŋ kɔ̌ːŋ tɐ̀k̚ pìːt̚ hɐ̏ŋ tsēŋ kʰɵ́y tsʰíːm tsēŋ sɐ́n]

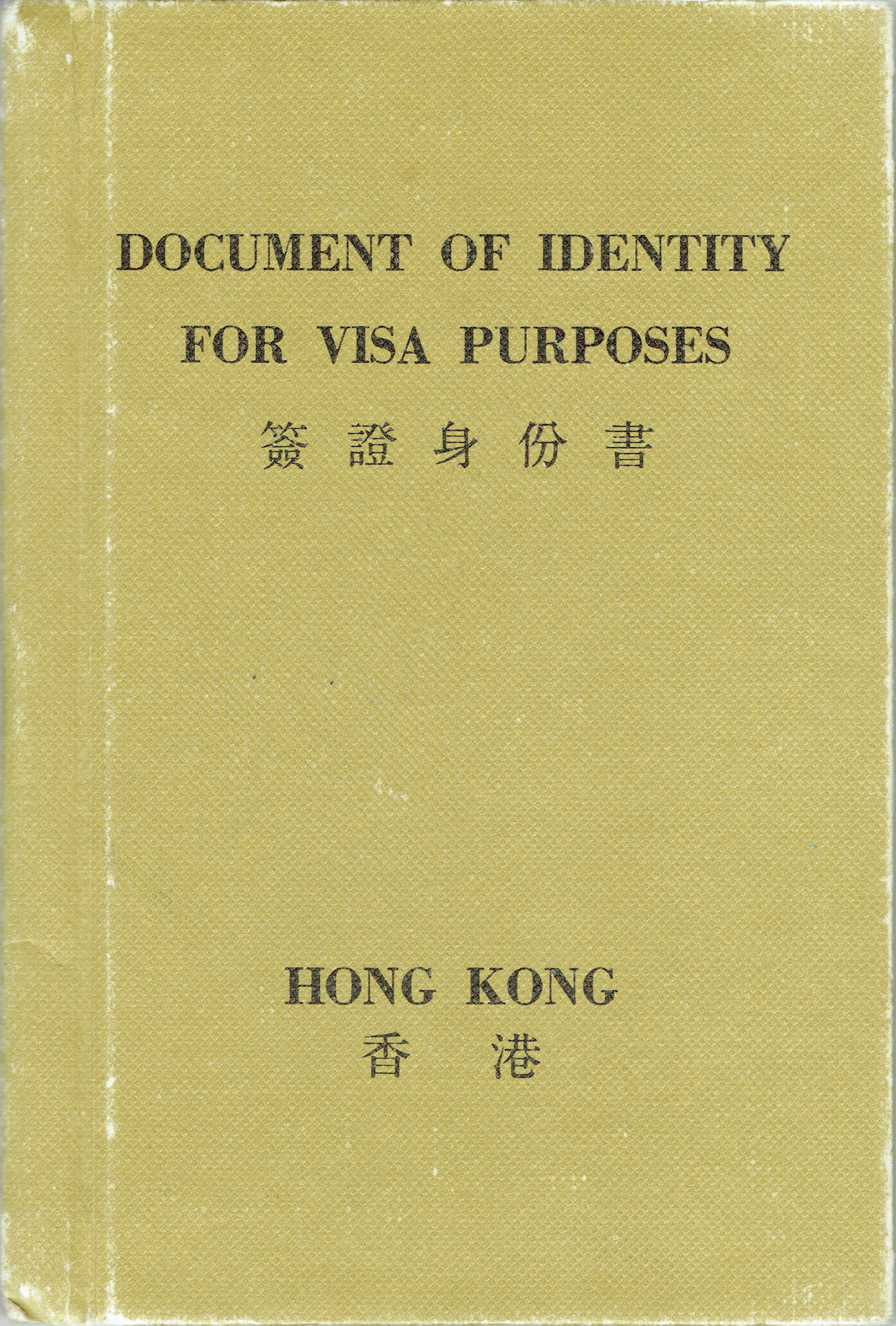
The front cover of the HKDI issued by British Hong Kong before 1997 handover

The Hong Kong Special Administrative Region Document of Identity for Visa Purposes (Chinese: 香港特別行政區簽證身份書) is a biometric travel document issued by the Hong Kong Immigration Department to residents of Hong Kong who are unable to obtain a national passport. It is usually valid for seven years.

The majority are issued to citizens of the People's Republic of China who have migrated to Hong Kong on a One-way Permit, have lost their mainland hukou thus are unable to obtain a PRC passport, but have not resided in Hong Kong for the 7 years required to be eligible for a HKSAR passport. In 2009–2010, 54,554 Documents of Identity for Visa Purposes were issued. In 2021 a total of 23,968 such documents were issued.

== Eligibility ==
The Document of Identity can be issued to the following categories of individuals who are connected with Hong Kong and who are unable to obtain a national passport or travel document from any other country:

- Those on a limit of stay in Hong Kong
- Those on unconditional stay (i.e. possess the right to land) who do not have the right of abode in Hong Kong
- Those who have the right of abode in Hong Kong and hold a permanent identity card, but are not of Chinese nationality or ineligible for Chinese nationality

== Physical appearance ==
=== Identification page ===
The identification page appears on a polycarbonate insert between the front cover and the first page. Using laser engraving technology, the holder's photograph is printed in black and white, with the holder's Hong Kong Identity Card number printed vertically on the right-hand side of the portrait photograph. The passport is also machine readable, designed for immigration control points equipped with passport scanners. Details which are printed include:

- Travel document type: PH
- Code of Issuing State: CHN
- Document number
- Surname and Given Names: in Traditional Chinese characters and English
- Nationality:
- Sex: denoted as "M" (male) or "F" (female)
- Place of birth: if born in China, the name of the province/autonomous region/municipality/Special Administrative Region (i.e. Hong Kong or Macau); if born in other countries, the name of the country of birth
- Dates of birth, issuance and expiry: displayed in the format DD-MMM-YY
- Authority (of issue): "IMMIGRATION DEPARTMENT, HONG KONG SPECIAL ADMINISTRATIVE REGION" (in Chinese and English)

== Use ==
As an international travel document, the Hong Kong Document of Identity may be used for entry into and exit from Hong Kong. However, since it is not a formal passport, there are certain restrictions. Few foreign countries and dependent territories which offer visa-free access to Hong Kong SAR passport holders confer the same privilege to holders of the Hong Kong SAR Document of Identity.

Mainland China	Mainland Chinese authorities do NOT accept the DIs issued to Chinese citizens as a valid travel document to enter or transit through the mainland China. The Ministry of Public Security is clear that Chinese citizens permanently resident in Hong Kong must use a Mainland Travel Permit for Hong Kong and Macau Residents to travel the mainland.
Macau	Hong Kong permanent residents may enter Macau for one year using their permanent ID regardless of their citizenship status. Hong Kong non-permanent residents who possess a Document of Identity and a Hong Kong identity card may enter Macau for 30 days.
Taiwan	Holders of a Hong Kong Document of Identity are required to apply for an Entry and Exit Permit in advance.
Germany Hungary	In theory, recognised refugees and stateless individuals who possess a Hong Kong SAR Document of identity can enter Germany and Hungary visa-free for a maximum of 90 days within a 180-day period. In the case of Germany, for recognised refugees to enter visa-free, their travel document must be endorsed and issued under the terms of the Agreement of 15 October 1946 regarding the issue of travel documents to refugees or the Convention relating to the Status of Refugees of 28 July 1951, whilst stateless individuals need to have their travel document issued under the terms of the Convention relating to the Status of Stateless Persons of 28 September 1954. However, though the People's Republic of China is a signatory to the 1951 Convention Relating to the Status of Refugees, since the Handover in 1997, Hong Kong has not incorporated the convention into its legislation, and so Hong Kong's immigration system does not recognise refugees. Similarly, both the People's Republic of China and Hong Kong are not signatories to the 1954 Stateless Persons Convention. Consequently, in practice, the visa exemption to Germany does not apply to any holder of the HKSAR Document of Identity. However, Hong Kong stateless individuals do nonetheless qualify for a visa exemption to Hungary since the Hungarian government does not require their HKSAR Document of Identity to be issued under the terms of the 1954 Stateless Persons Convention.
Malta Poland Slovakia	If the holder of a Document of Identity is a school pupil who is an Annex I national (i.e. he/she is required to possess a visa for all stays in Schengen agreement states), he/she can enter Malta, Poland and Slovakia visa-free by virtue of Article 4(2) as long as they are travelling as part of a school trip led by a school teacher for a maximum of 90 days within a 180-day period. This visa exemption applies equally to any Annex I national (e.g. a Chinese citizen who holds a PRC passport) who is resident in Hong Kong who satisfies the above conditions. Note, however, that this visa exemption for school pupils does not apply to the holder of a Document of Identity if he/she is stateless, since he/she would not fulfill the criteria of being the national of an Annex I country.

Since some holders of the Hong Kong SAR Document of Identity are not Chinese citizens (though the majority are new immigrants from mainland China to Hong Kong and have been unable to obtain an ordinary Chinese passport), they are not entitled to the consular protection offered by the People's Republic of China government while overseas. However, Chinese foreign missions are able to assist should a Document of Identity become lost or stolen whilst abroad.

== See also ==
- Hong Kong Special Administrative Region passport
- Right of abode issue, Hong Kong
- History of Hong Kong
- Hong Kong identity card
- Macao Special Administrative Region Travel Permit
