= Australian Passport Office =

Australia independent operating agency

Australian Passport Office is an independent operating agency of the Government of Australia with bureaucratic oversight provided through the Department of Foreign Affairs and Trade (DFAT) portfolio. It issues Australian passports to Australian citizens in Australia and overseas under the Australian Passports Act 2005 and related laws. The Passport Office may also issue other types of travel documents to non-citizens, such as Australian Convention Travel Document, Australian Certificate of Identity or Document of Identity. DFAT has offices in each of the nine Australian capital cities.

Since 24 October 2005, Australia has issued only biometric passports, called ePassports, which have an embedded microchip that contains the same personal information that is on the colour photo page of the passport, including a digitised photograph. As all previous passports have now expired, all Australian passports are now biometric.

== Agents ==
The Australian Passport Office work with two agents, Australia Post and Australian Passport Information Service (APIS). Australia Post provides a nationwide passport service on behalf of DFAT through over 1,700 outlets. Its role includes distributing application forms for Australian passports, receiving Australian passport applications and renewal applications and interviewing applicants. The Australian Passport Information Service (APIS) provides a high quality telephone information service for Australian passport clients.

Australian passports can be renewed overseas by submitting a completed passport renewal application form in person at the nearest Australian embassy, high commission or consulate, together with the previous passport and two identical photos, and payment of the fee, including the overseas surcharge.

== See also ==
- Australian passport
- Australian nationality law
- Australian Border Force
- Passport
- Five Nations Passport Group
