= Refugee travel document =

Travel document issued to refugees

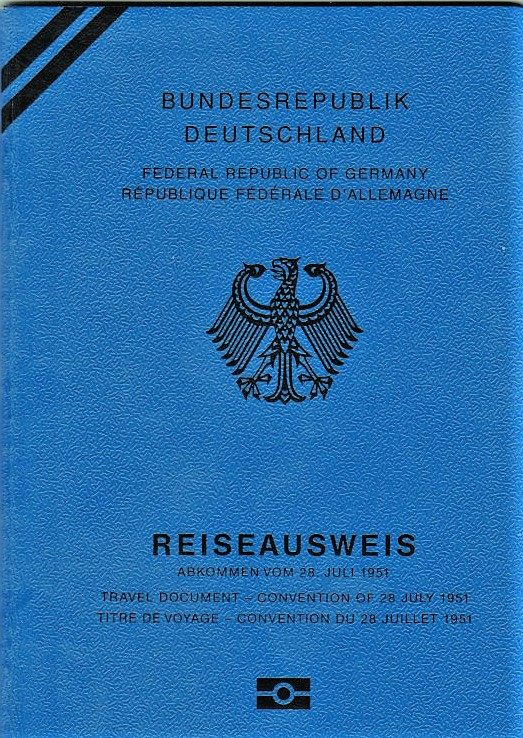
A German travel document for refugees.

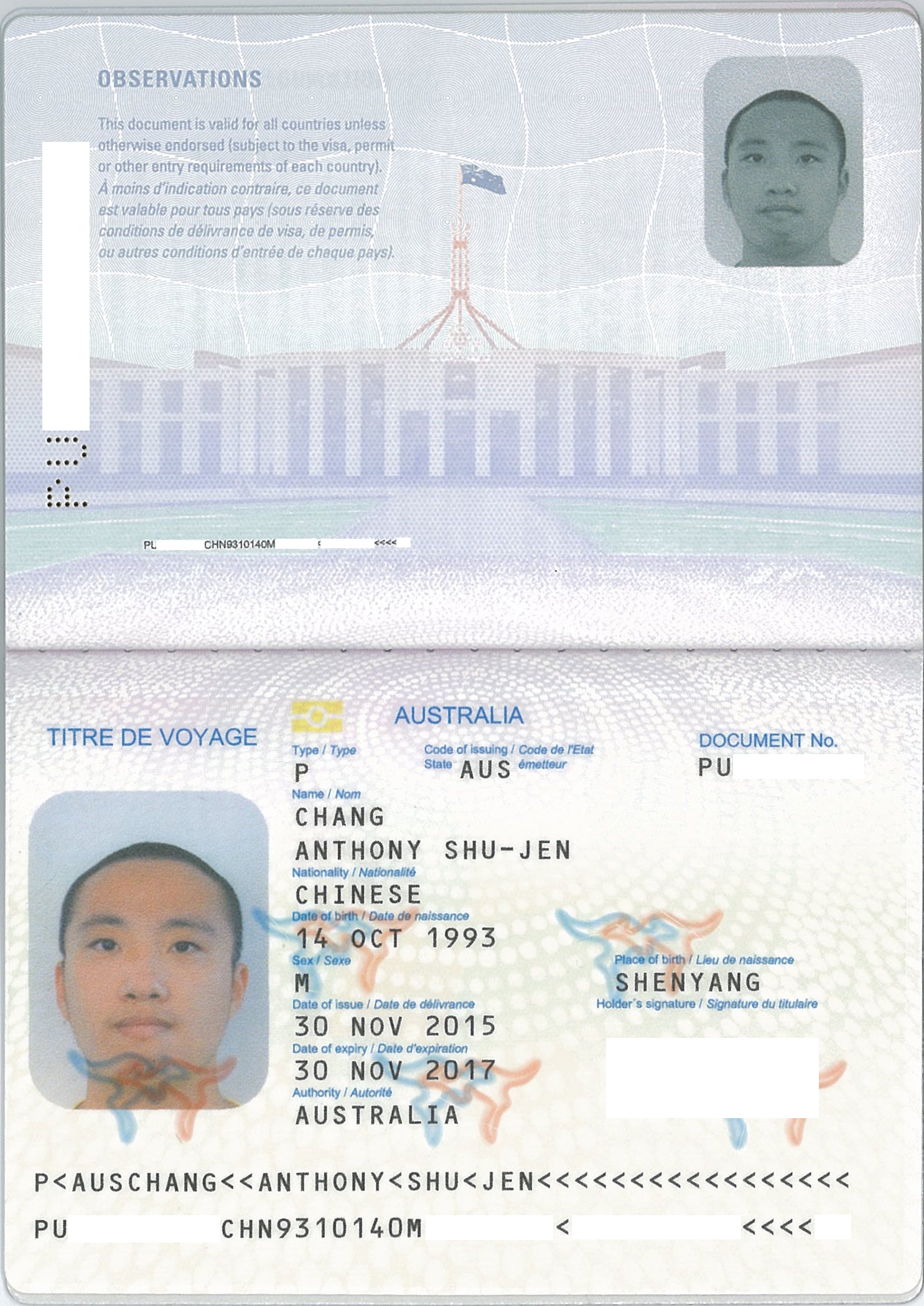
The bio-data page of an Australian refugee travel document issued to a Chinese refugee

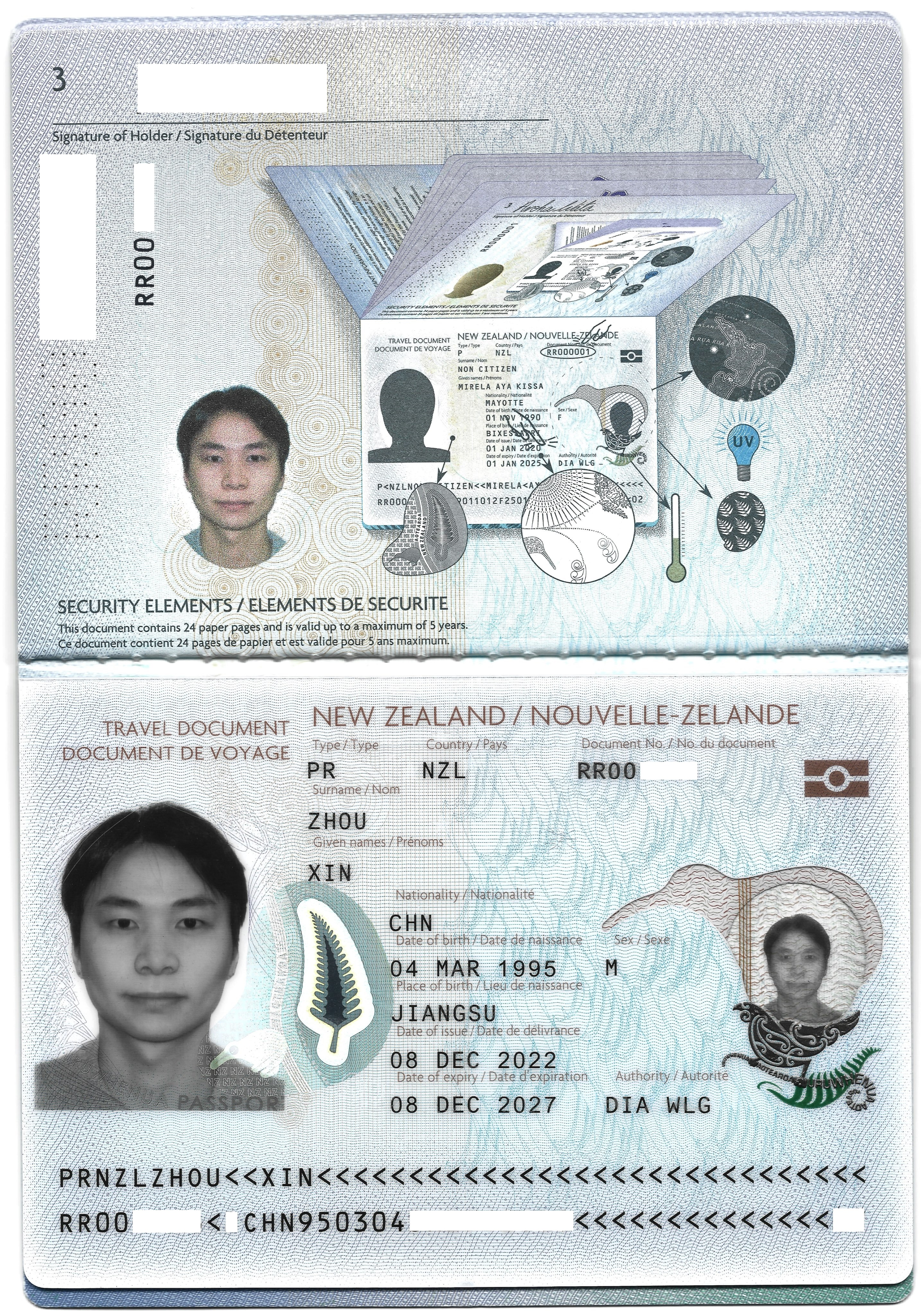
The bio-data page of a New Zealand refugee travel document issued to a Chinese refugee

A refugee travel document, also called a 1951 Convention travel document, is a travel document issued to a refugee by the state in which they now reside. As refugees are usually unable to obtain passports from their state of nationality, because they have fled persecution or sought asylum from the authorities of that state, an alternative document is necessary to allow them to travel internationally.

Travel documents for refugees are booklets similar to passports. Each country is responsible for the travel documents it issues to refugees. In many cases, their cover bears the words "Travel Document" in English and French (and often in the language of the issuing state).

However, as a refugee travel document is not a regular national passport, some problems may be encountered by the holder from time to time, for example due to non-familiarity of airline staff with such documents.

== Travel documents issued to refugees ==
- New Zealand Refugee Travel Document
- Estonian travel document for refugees
- U.S. Refugee Travel Document (United States)
- Australian Convention Travel Document (this document by itself does not allow the bearer to return to Australia; for that, a separate visa must be obtained)
- Swiss Travel Document

== Limitations of a refugee travel document compared to a passport ==
- Refugee travel documents issued by the Government of Canada cannot be used for travel to the bearer’s country of citizenship, and a refugee travel document issued by another country is not treated as a valid passport for the purposes of obtaining an Electronic Travel Authorization to visit Canada. This restriction exists because refugees are generally considered to be under the protection of the country that granted them asylum, and returning to their country could indicate they no longer require that protection.
- Electronic Travel Authorization (eTA)
- Egyptian travel documents issued for Palestinian refugees are considered unacceptable travel documents for travel and entry to New Zealand, unless they include an entry visa allowing the holder to enter Egypt. This requirement exists because immigration authorities often require proof that a traveler will be able to re-enter another country after their visit.

== Gallery of refugee travel documents ==
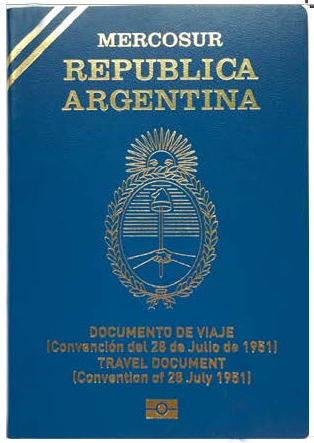
Argentine Refugee Travel Document

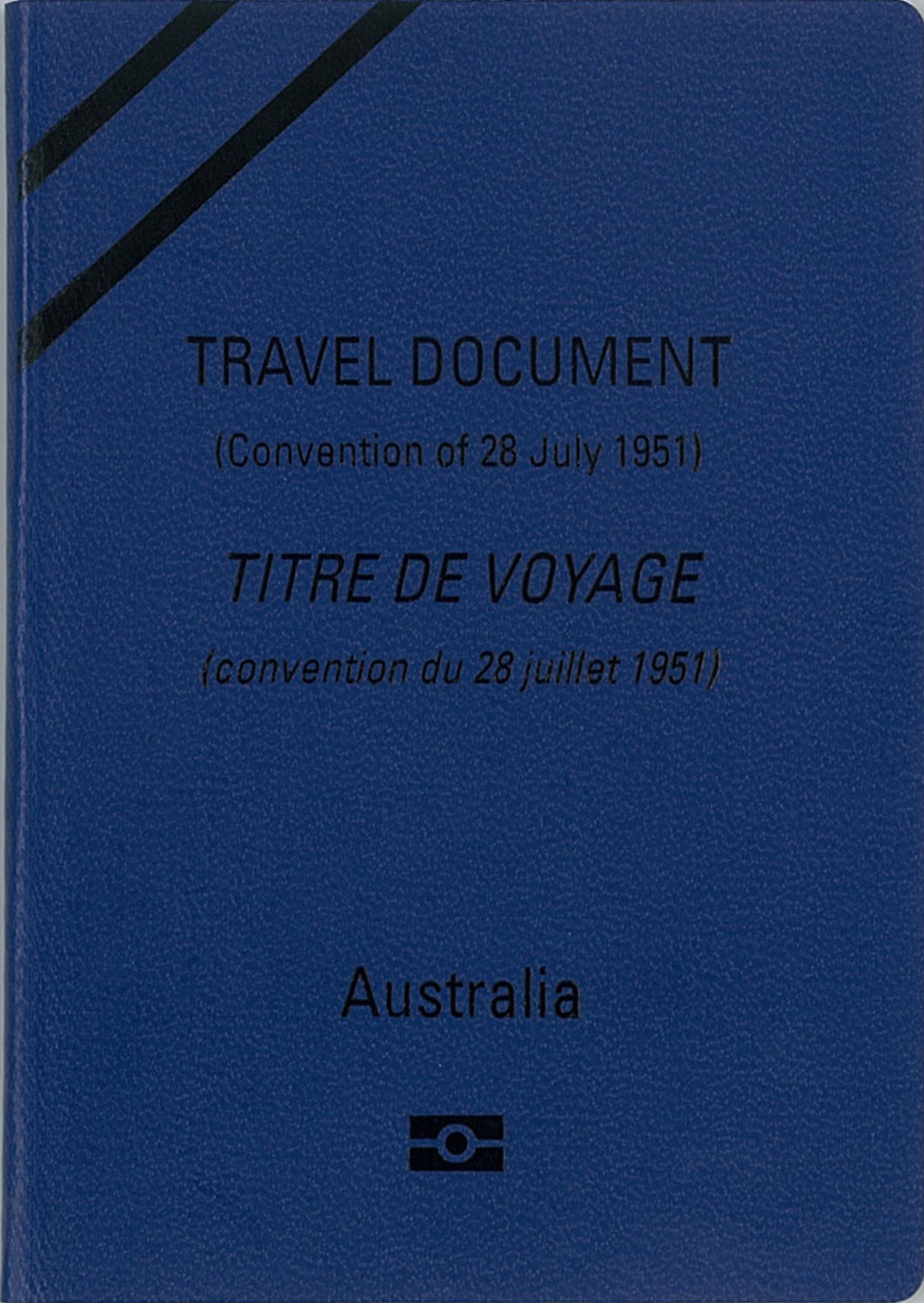
Australian Refugee Travel Document

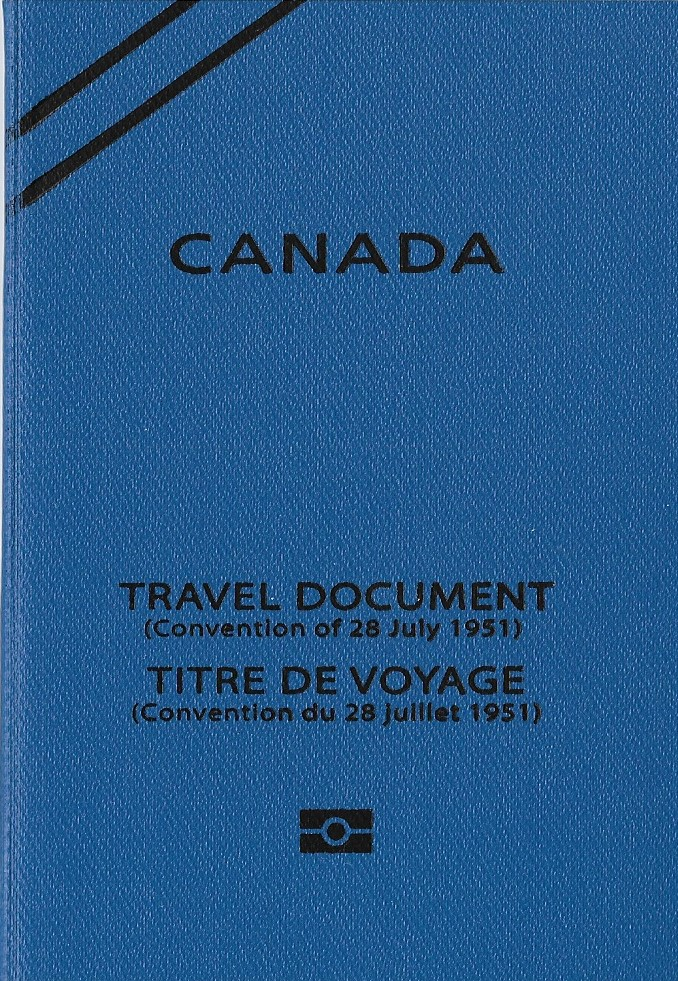
Canadian Refugee Travel Document

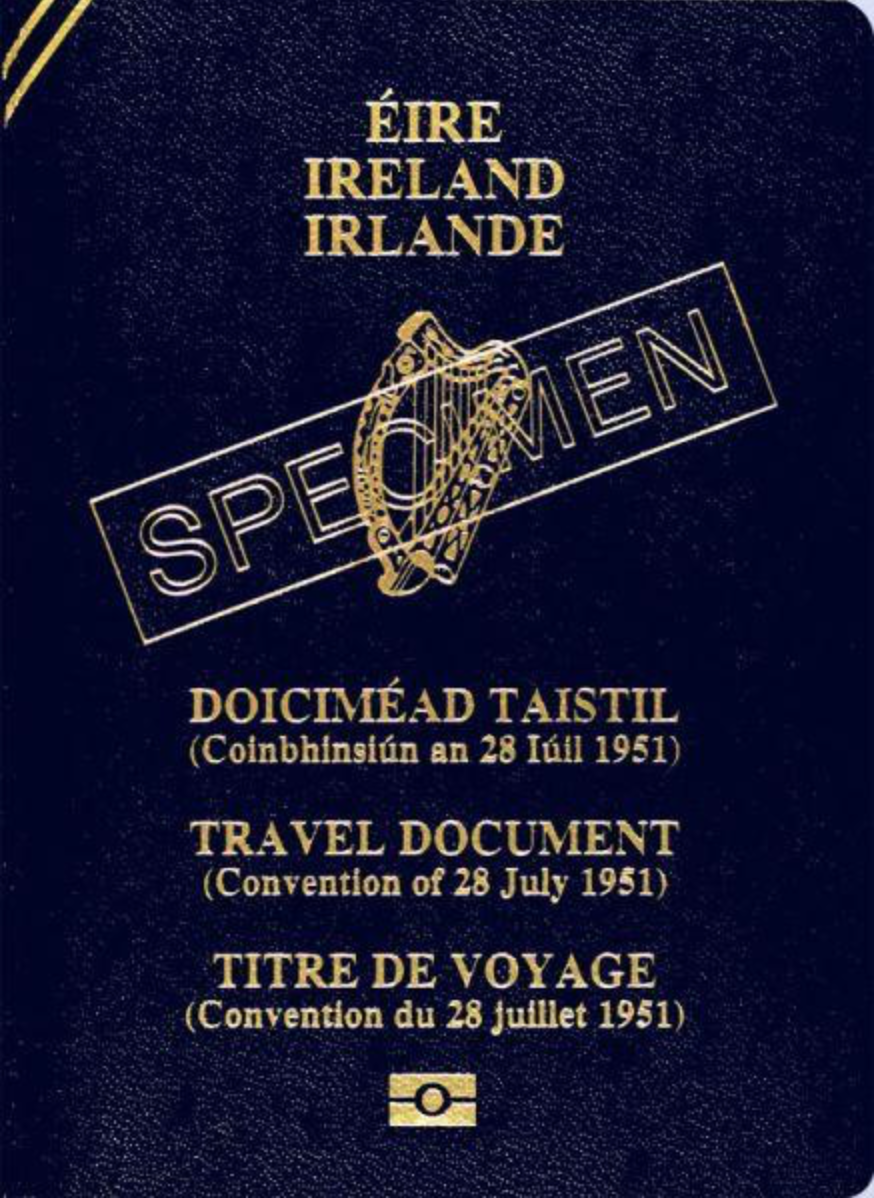
Irish Refugee Travel Document

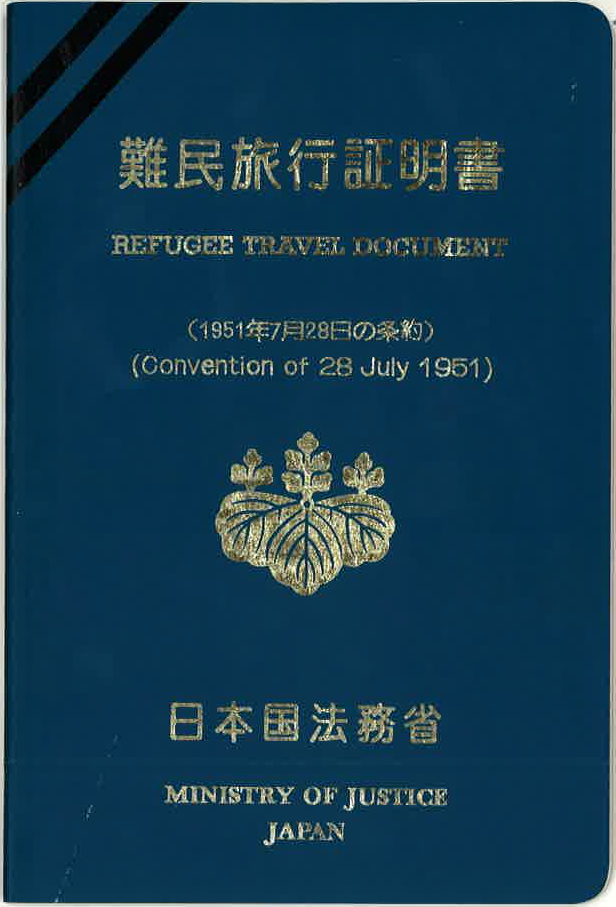
Japanese Refugee Travel Document

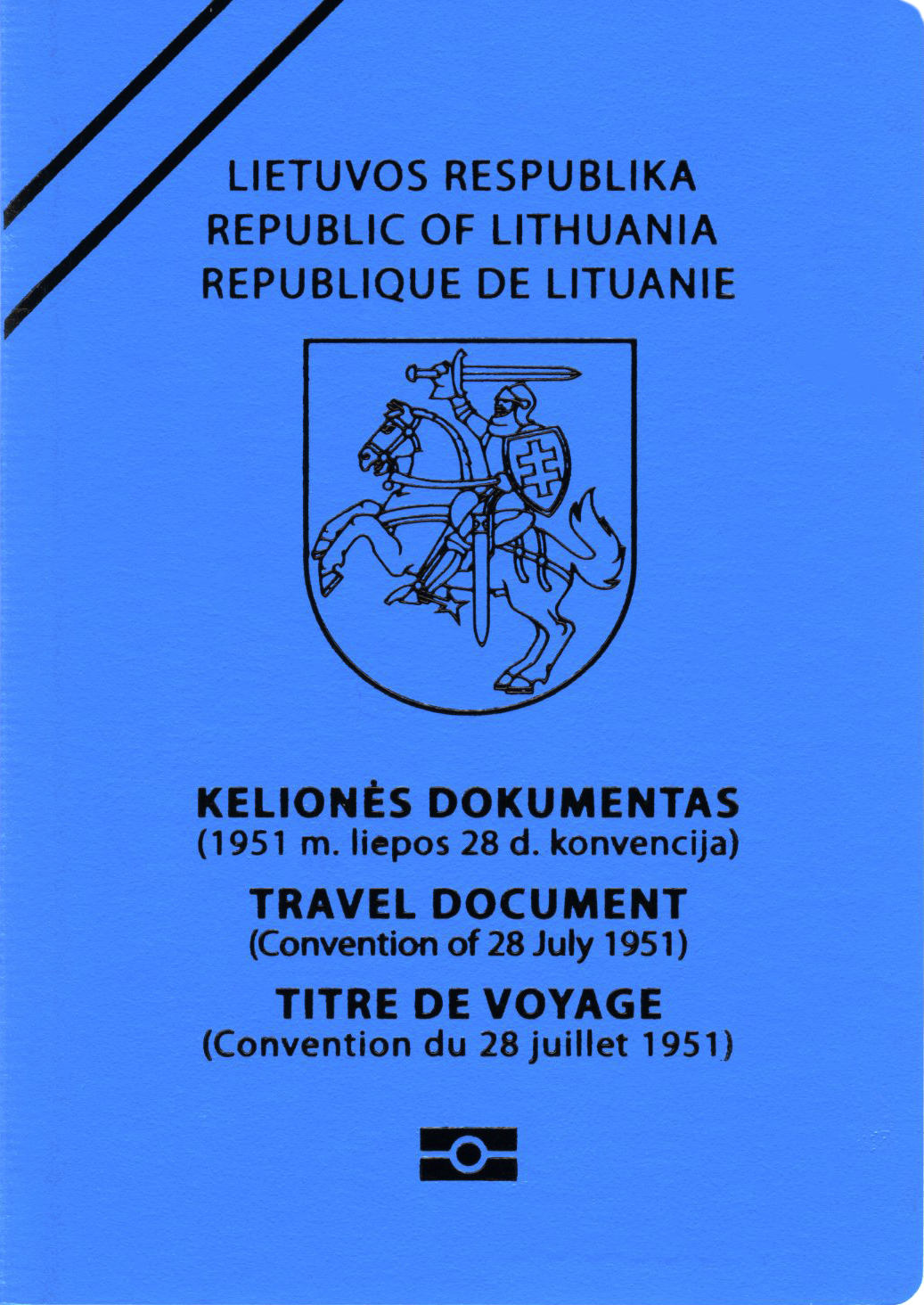
Lithuanian Refugee Travel Document

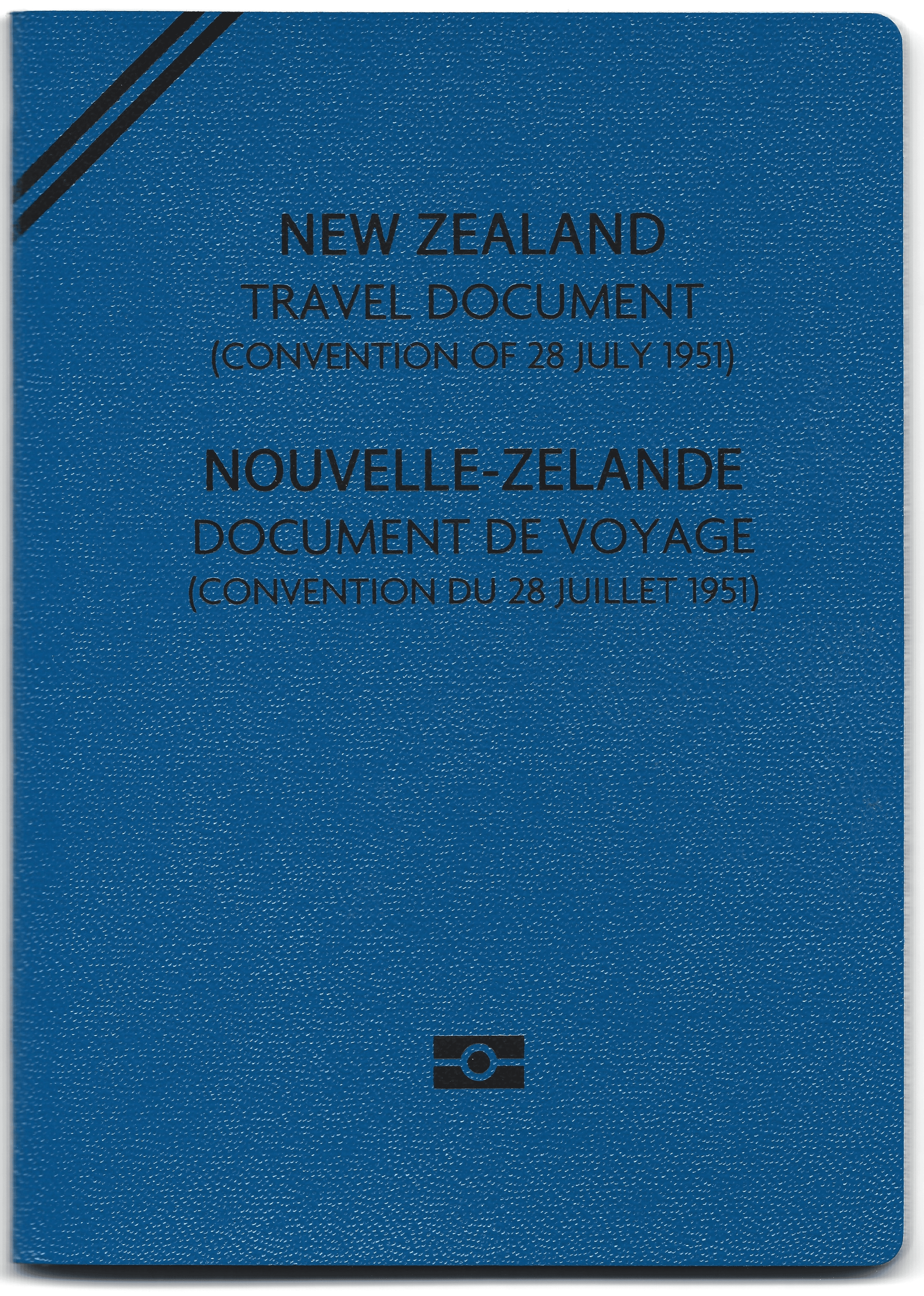
New Zealand Refugee Travel Document

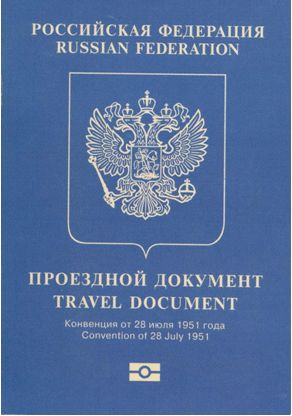
Russian Refugee Travel Document

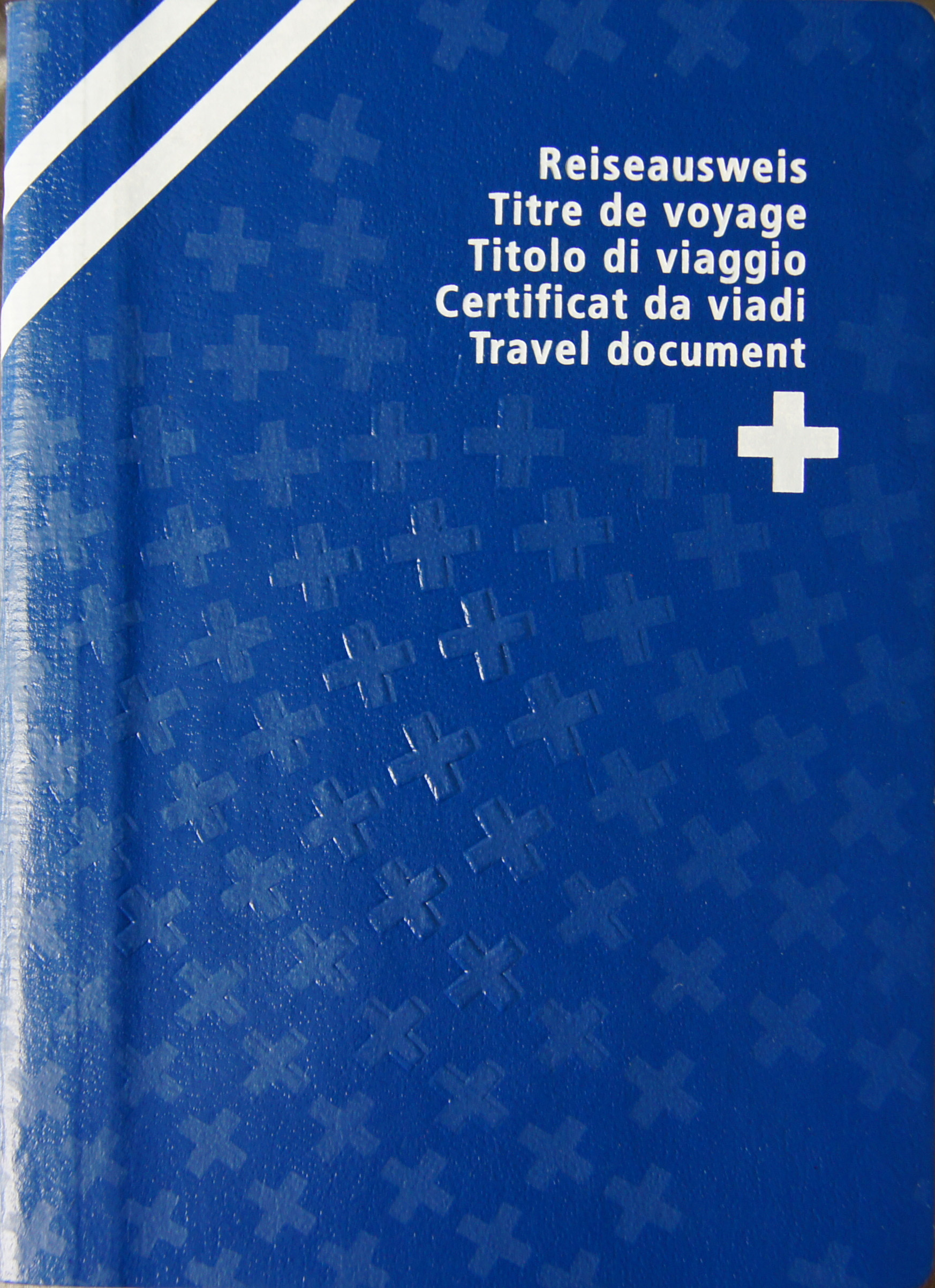
Swiss Refugee Travel Document

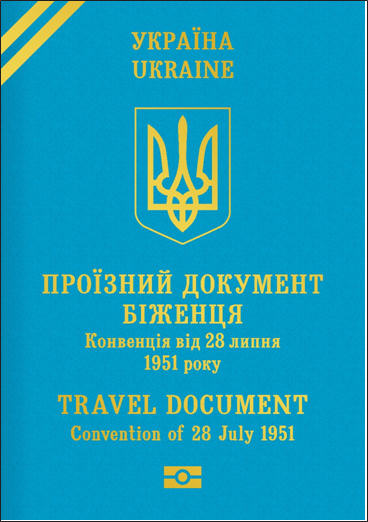
Ukrainian Refugee Travel Document

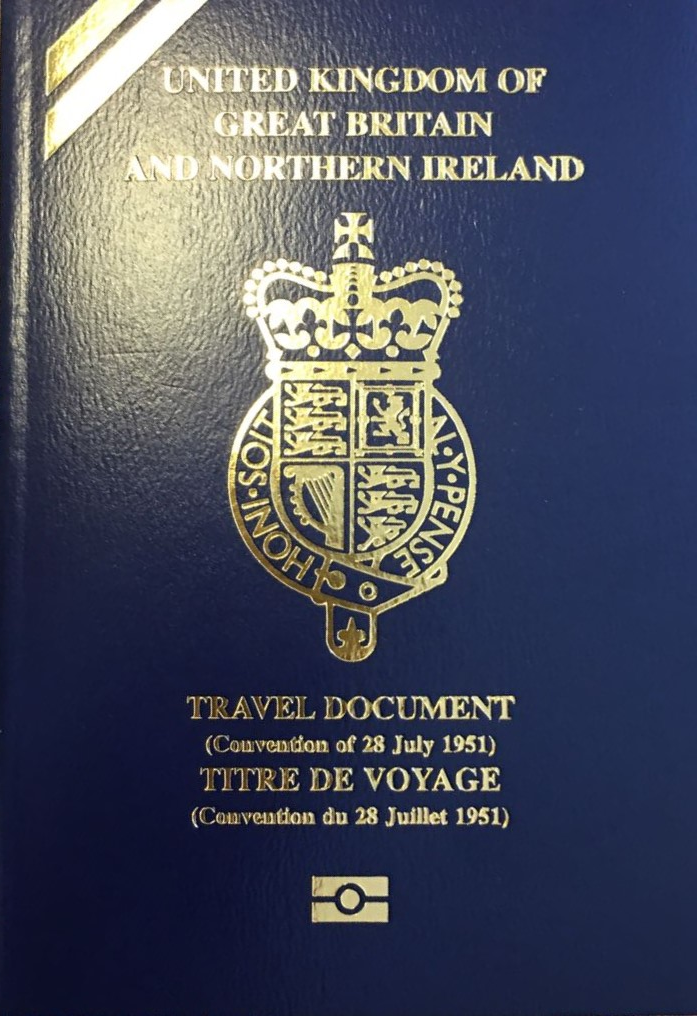
United Kingdom Refugee Travel Document

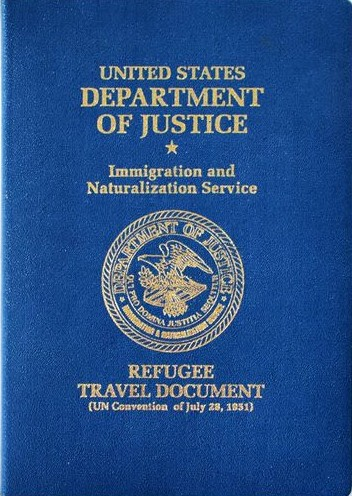
United States Refugee Travel Document

== See also ==
- Stateless person's travel document, similar document for stateless persons
- Certificate of identity, for stateless persons or others
- Refugee identity certificate
- Nansen passport, the predecessor of the refugee travel document

=== National non-citizen travel documents ===
- Australian Convention Travel Document
- Canadian Certificate of Identity
- Japan Re-entry Permit
- Australian Certificate of Identity. This document by itself does not allow the bearer to return to Australia; for that, a separate visa must be obtained.
