= Russian travel document for refugees =

Russian refugee travel document

Russian Travel Document Проездной документ РФ
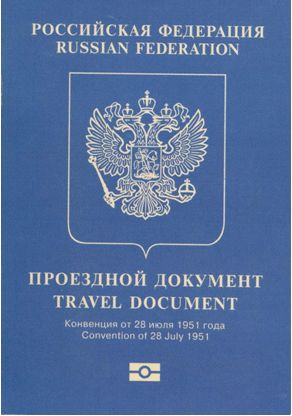
- The front cover of a Russian biometric Travel Document
- Type: Refugee travel document
- Issued by: Russia
- Purpose: International travel document for refugees
- Eligibility: refugees residing in Russia
- Expiration: 5 years

A Russian Travel Document (Russian: Проездной документ Российской Федерации) is a biometric refugee travel document issued for international travel purpose by the Ministry of Internal Affairs of the Russian Federation to individuals recognised as refugees residing in Russia under the 1951 Convention Relating to the Status of Refugees.

The Russian travel document enables the holder to leave Russia, to travel outside Russia (with limitations) and to re-enter Russia. However, this document is not a regular Russian passport.

== See also ==
- Travel document
- Russian Residence Permit of a Stateless Person
