= Document of Identity =

Document of Identity may refer to:

- An Identity document
- Australian Document of Identity
- Hong Kong Document of Identity
