= Residence Permit of a Stateless Person =

Russian residence permit type

Russian Certificate of Identity
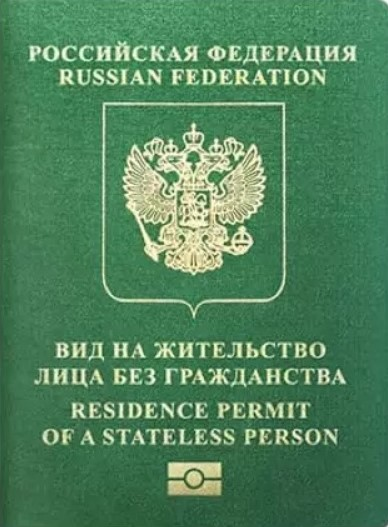
- The front cover of a Russian biometric Certificate of Identity
- Type: Travel document
- Issued by: Russia
- Purpose: International travel document
- Eligibility: Non-Russian citizens
- Expiration: 10 years

The Residence Permit of a Stateless Person is a biometric travel document issued by the Ministry of Internal Affairs of the Russian Federation to stateless individuals. It may to serve as a personal identification document.

It may be issued to a person who lives in the Russian Federation and whose citizenship of the Russian Federation has been terminated.

== See also ==
- Russian travel document
- Residence permit of a foreign citizen
