= Five Nations Passport Group =

Forum for discussing passport policies

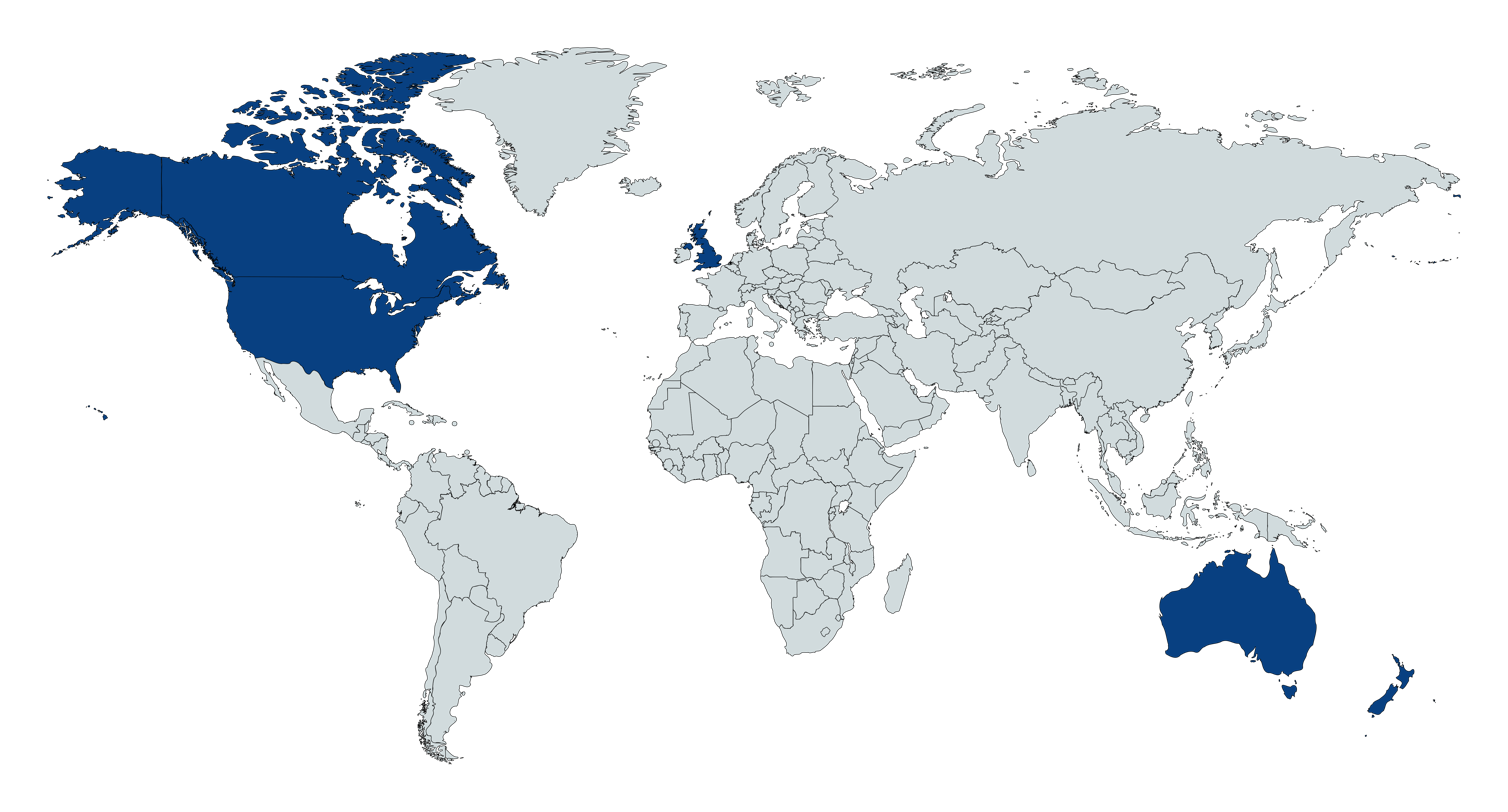
- Five Nations shown in dark blue
- Members: Australia; Canada; New Zealand; United Kingdom; United States

The Five Nations Passport Group is an international forum for the passport-issuing authorities of Australia, Canada, New Zealand, the United Kingdom and the United States to share best practices in the issuance, development, and management of passports. The annual Five Nations Passport Conference is a largely informal in-person meeting between officials of the participating agencies, with some additional invited guests such as the Irish Department of Foreign Affairs and Trade in 2011. It has taken place since at least as far back as 2004.

The member states' issuing authorities are comparable to each other: their passport issuance systems are mostly centralised and their service channels are similar to each other. None of the Five Nations countries has a compulsory identity management system, which means that citizens' personal information is not available in a central citizenship database or registry.

The same five nations participate in the Five Eyes intelligence sharing alliance, although there are no connections between the programs beyond the member countries' cultural proximity.

== Participating issuing authorities ==
The agency that participates in the Five Nations Passport Group for each state is their relevant passport-issuing authority:

- Australia: Australian Passport Office, Australia Post
- Canada: Immigration, Refugees and Citizenship Canada, Service Canada Centre of Employment and Social Development Canada
- New Zealand: Department of Internal Affairs
- United Kingdom: His Majesty's Passport Office
- United States: Department of State

== Passport specifications ==
Unlike EU passports, which follow a common format, Five Nations passports develop through the sharing of best practices and information relating to the development of passports. However, all Five Nations passports are biometric and machine-readable, and B7 sized (ISO/IEC 7810 ID-3, 88 mm × 125 mm).

Generally, Five Nations passport holders have access to each other's automated border control systems. Currently, all Five Nations passport holders have access to Australia and New Zealand's SmartGate system and the UK's ePassport gates. Similarly, Australian and British passport holders (Note: Restricted to citizens of the United Kingdom only) have access to the US's Global Entry programme, while Canadians have access to the NEXUS programme.

== Passport circulation ==
The numbers of Five Nations passports in circulation are:

- Australia: 15,000,000 (2025)
- Canada: 23,790,000 (2018)
- New Zealand: 2,900,000
- United Kingdom
  - British Citizen: 53,456,029 (2025)
  - Gibraltar: 2,317 (2025)
  - British National (Overseas): 710,369 (2025)
- United States: 183,170,240 (Note: Includes United States passport cards) (2025 fiscal year)

== See also ==
- Anglosphere
- Border Five
- CANZUK
- Five Country Conference
- Five Eyes
- Australian passport
- British passport
- Canadian passport
- New Zealand passport
- United States passport
  - United States passport card
