= Visa requirements for Australian citizens =

Administrative entry restrictions

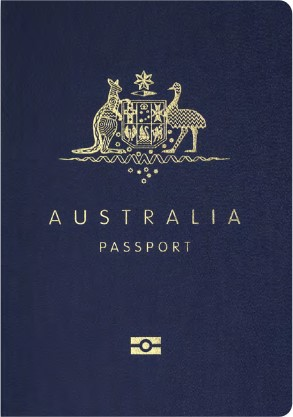
An Australian passport

Visa requirements for Australian passport holders are administrative entry restrictions by the authorities of other states placed on citizens of Australia entering with an Australian passport.

As of 2026, Australian citizens had visa-free or visa on arrival access to 182 countries and territories, ranking the Australian passport 7th in the world according to the Henley Passport Index.

Besides visa requirements, most countries specify other requirements for the entry of Australian and other citizens into their country. For example, that a prospective entrant has no criminal history or health issues, or that there is evidence of sufficient funds or of a ticket for exit.

== Visa requirements map ==
Visa requirements for Australian citizens holding ordinary passports Australia Freedom of movement Visa not required / ESTA / ETA Visa on arrival eVisa Visa available both on arrival or online Visa required

== Visa requirements ==
Each country has a multitude of visa types, each with its particular purpose and requirements. Rules for visits by ordinary passport holders are as follows:

| Country / Region | Visa requirement | Allowed stay | Notes (excluding departure fees) | Reciprocity (Note: In this column, Australia's eVisitor and ETA systems are deemed to be reciprocal to U.S.'s ESTA system, Canada's eTA system and other countries' visa-free programs.) |
|---|---|---|---|---|
| Afghanistan | eVisa | 30 days | e-Visa : Visitors must arrive at Kabul International (KBL).; Visa in advance for visitors to Afghanistan must be applied.; Due to safety concerns, Australian government advises its citizens to not visit Afghanistan. | X |
| Albania | Visa not required | 90 days | | X |
| Algeria | Visa required | | Persons may be denied entry if entering with a passport containing visas or stamps issued by Israel.; Visitors on tours organized to some southern regions by an approved travel agency may obtain a visa on arrival for up to 30 days. | ✓ |
| Andorra | Visa not required | 90 days | | ✓ |
| Angola | Visa not required | 30 days | 30 days per trip, but no more than 90 days within any 1 calendar year for tourism purposes only.; Visitors must have a return/onward ticket and a hotel reservation confirmation.; An International Certificate of Vaccination is required. | X |
| Antigua and Barbuda | Visa not required | 1 month | | X |
| Argentina | Visa not required | 90 days | | X |
| Armenia | Visa not required | 180 days | | X |
| Austria | Visa not required | 90 days | 90 days per entry regardless of previous time spent in other Schengen countries | ✓ |
| Azerbaijan | eVisa | 30 days | | X |
| Bahamas | Visa not required | 3 months | | X |
| Bahrain | eVisa / Visa on arrival | 14 days | | X |
| Bangladesh | Visa on arrival | 30 days | Not available at all entry points. | X |
| Barbados | Visa not required | 6 months | | X |
| Belarus | Visa not required / eVisa | 30 days | Must arrive and depart via Minsk International Airport, and not to / from Russia; e-Visa can be issued for 30 days and can be used at all international checkpoints, including road and rail.; Due to security concerns, as well as Belarus' support of the Russian invasion of Ukraine, the Australian government advises its citizens not to visit Belarus. | X |
| Belgium | Visa not required | 90 days | 90 days within any 180-day period in the Schengen Area. Additionally bilateral agreement permits 2 months on top of this. | ✓ |
| Belize | Visa not required | | | X |
| Benin | eVisa | 30 days | Must have an international vaccination certificate.; Three types of electronic visa are offered: the e-Visa valid for 30 days for a single entry (50 EUR), the e-Visa valid for 30 days for several (multiple) entries (75 EUR), and the e-Visa valid for 90 days to make several (multiple) entries (100 EUR). | X |
| Bhutan | eVisa | 90 days | The Sustainable Development Fee (SDF) of 200 USD per person, per night for almost all visitors to Bhutan. Additionally, if payment is made in US dollars from September 1, 2023 to August 31, 2027, the SDF is 100 USD. | ✓ |
| Bolivia | Visa not required | 90 days | | X |
| Bosnia and Herzegovina | Visa not required | 90 days | 90 days within any 6-month period. | X |
| Botswana | Visa not required | 90 days | 90 days within any 1-year period. | X |
| Brazil | eVisa | 90 days | Brazilian authorities have announced that Australian citizens will require a visa beginning 10 April 2025. | X |
| Brunei | Visa on arrival | 30 days | | X |
| Bulgaria | Visa not required | 90 days | 90 days within any 180-day period in the Schengen Area. | ✓ |
| Burkina Faso | eVisa | | Due to security concerns, the Australian government advises its citizens not to visit Burkina Faso. | X |
| Burundi | Online Visa / Visa on arrival | 1 month | | X |
| Cambodia | eVisa / Visa on arrival | 30 days | Visa is also obtainable online. | X |
| Cameroon | eVisa | | A tax for a visa on internal flights must be obtained upon arrival into Cameroon. | ✓ |
| Canada | Electronic Travel Authorization | 6 months | eTA required if arriving by air.; Also, an eTA not required when arriving by car, bus, train or boat (including a cruise ship). | ✓ |
| Cape Verde | Visa on arrival | 30 days | Not available at all entry points. | X |
| Central African Republic | Visa required | | A letter of invitation to the Central African Republic must be applied in advance for 2 weeks upon planned date of travel.; Due to safety concerns, Australian government advises its citizens not to visit Central African Republic. | ✓ |
| Chad | eVisa | | Due to the significant risk of terrorism, kidnapping, crime and civil unrest, Australian government advises its citizens not to visit Chad. | X |
| Chile | Visa not required | 90 days | Since the 17th of September 2025, Australians no longer require a visa for stays of up to 90 days | X |
| China | Visa not required | 30 days | Visa-free from 1 July 2024 to 31 December 2026.; 240-hour (10-day) visa-free transit to a third country or region (including Hong Kong, Macau or Taiwan) using any mode of transport. Must have a confirmed onward ticket/itinerary, and enter through 1 of 64 approved ports.; During which, may freely travel within the 24 provinces permitted for visa-free transit and engage in tourism, business, and visits.; 24-hour visa-free transit to a third country or region (including Hong Kong, Macau, and Taiwan), is available at most international airports, without leaving the airport.; Travellers who need to leave the airport may obtain a temporary entry permit from immigration.; 5-day port visa (Visa on Arrival) for Shenzhen if arriving at designated ports of entry from Hong Kong by land or sea, for stays within Shenzhen.; 3-day port visa (Visa on Arrival) if arriving in Zhuhai or Xiamen at designated ports of entry, for stays within the respective city.; 15-day visa-free entry for cruise ship passengers in tour groups, if arriving at any cruise port along China's coastline, including but not limited to Tianjin; Dalian; Shanghai; Lianyungang; Wenzhou; Zhoushan; Xiamen; Qingdao; Guangzhou; Shenzhen; Beihai; Haikou; Sanya. May further travel inland to all regions of coastal provinces (and equivalents) and Beijing.; May apply for a port visa (Visa on Arrival) if travelling for an urgent, qualified reason. Prior clearance for port visa is highly recommended or may be denied boarding by airlines. | X |
| Colombia | Visa not required | 90 days | 90 days - extendable up to 180 days stay within a 1-year period. | X |
| Comoros | Visa on arrival | 45 days | | X |
| Republic of the Congo | Visa required | | Visa and invitation letters approved via tour operators only. | ✓ |
| Democratic Republic of the Congo | eVisa | 7 days | Visa on arrival at Ndjili International Airport if a letter of invitation (Visa volant) issued by the Ministry of Interior and Security is conferred.; Due to security concerns, the Australian government advises its citizens not to visit the Democratic Republic of Congo. | X |
| Costa Rica | Visa not required | 90 days | | X |
| Côte d'Ivoire | eVisa | 3 months | e-Visa holders must arrive via Port Bouet Airport. | X |
| Croatia | Visa not required | 90 days | 90 days within any 180-day period in the Schengen Area. | ✓ |
| Cuba | eVisa | 90 days | The Australian Government advises its citizens to 'exercise a high degree of caution in Cuba due to the threat of violent crime'. | X |
| Cyprus | Visa not required | 90 days | 90 days within any 180-day period. | ✓ |
| Czech Republic | Visa not required | 90 days | 90 days within any 180-day period in the Schengen Area. | ✓ |
| Denmark | Visa not required | 90 days | 90 days within any 180-day period. regardless of previous time spent in other Schengen countries (except the other Nordic countries) | ✓ |
| Djibouti | eVisa | 90 days | | X |
| Dominica | Visa not required | 6 months | | X |
| Dominican Republic | Visa not required | 90 days | | X |
| Ecuador | Visa not required | 90 days | | X |
| Egypt | eVisa / Visa on arrival | 30 days | Visa-on-arrival costs 30 USD for single entry visa (Tourism). | X |
| El Salvador | Visa not required | 3 months | | X |
| Equatorial Guinea | eVisa | 30 days | | X |
| Eritrea | Visa required | | A tourist visa for Australian citizens is issued for a stay of 1 month from arrival to Eritrea. | ✓ |
| Estonia | Visa not required | 90 days | 90 days within any 180-day period in the Schengen Area. | ✓ |
| Eswatini | Visa not required | 30 days | | X |
| Ethiopia | eVisa / Visa on arrival | 90 days | Visa on arrival is obtainable only at Addis Ababa Bole International Airport.; e-Visa holders must arrive via Addis Ababa Bole International Airport.; e-Visa is available for 30 or 90 days. | ✓ |
| Fiji | Visa not required | 4 months | | X |
| Finland | Visa not required | 90 days | 90 days within any 180-day period regardless of previous time spent in other Schengen countries. | ✓ |
| France | Visa not required | 90 days | 90 days within any 180-day period in metropolitan France, regardless of previous time spent in other Schengen countries. | ✓ |
| Gabon | eVisa | 90 days | e-Visa holders must arrive via Libreville International Airport. | X |
| Gambia | Visa not required | 90 days | | X |
| Georgia | Visa not required | 1 year | | X |
| Germany | Visa not required | 90 days | 90 days per entry regardless of previous time spent in other Schengen countries. | ✓ |
| Ghana | eVisa | | Visitors staying longer than 60 days are required to extend their visas at the Immigration Service. | ✓ |
| Greece | Visa not required | 90 days | 90 days within any 180-day period in the Schengen Area. | ✓ |
| Grenada | Visa not required | 3 months | | X |
| Guatemala | Visa not required | 90 days | | X |
| Guinea | eVisa | 90 days | | X |
| Guinea-Bissau | Visa on arrival | 90 days | | X |
| Guyana | Visa not required | 90 days | | X |
| Haiti | Visa not required | 3 months | Due to security concerns, the Australian government advises its citizens not to visit Haiti. | X |
| Honduras | Visa not required | 3 months | | X |
| Hungary | Visa not required | 90 days | 90 days within any 180-day period in the Schengen Area. | ✓ |
| Iceland | Visa not required | 90 days | 90 days within any 180-day period regardless of previous time spent in other Schengen countries. | ✓ |
| India | eVisa | 30 days | e-Visa holders must arrive via 32 designated airports (Note: Ahmedabad; Amritsar; Bagdogra; Bengaluru; Bhubaneswar; Chandigarh; Chennai; Coimbatore; Delhi; Gaya; Goa-Dabolim; Goa-Manohar; Guwahati; Hyderabad; Indore; Jaipur; Kannur; Kochi; Kolkata; Kozhikode; Lucknow; Madurai; Mangaluru; Mumbai; Nagpur; Port Blair; Pune; Surat; Thiruvananthapuram; Tiruchirappalli; Varanasi; Visakhapatnam) or 5 designated seaports. (Note: Chennai; Cochin; Mormugao; Mumbai; Mangalore); An Indian e-Tourist Visa may only be obtained twice within 1 calendar year.; Foreigners of Pakistani origin or who hold a Pakistani Passport are not eligible for an e-Visa. Foreigners who are not Pakistani nationals, but whose parents or grandparents (either paternal or maternal) were born in, or were permanent residents in Pakistan, are also not eligible for an e-Visa. | X |
| Indonesia | e-VOA / Visa on arrival | 30 days | Visa on arrival is extendable up to 60 days. | X |
| Iran | eVisa | 30 days | Passengers who have already made an application, at least two days before arrival, at the Iranian Ministry of Foreign Affair's e-Visa website. and present the submission notification at the airport's visa desk may obtain a visa on arrival.; Due to security concerns, the Australian government advises its citizens not to visit Iran. | X |
| Iraq | eVisa | 30 days | Due to safety concerns, Australian government advises its citizens not to visit Iraq. | ✓ |
| Ireland | Visa not required | 3 months | | ✓ |
| Israel | Electronic Travel Authorization | 90 days | Entry refused to anyone who "knowingly issues a public call for boycotting Israel." | X |
| Italy | Visa not required | 90 days | 90 days within any 180-day period regardless of previous time spent in other Schengen countries. | ✓ |
| Jamaica | Visa not required | 30 days | | X |
| Japan | Visa not required | 90 days | | ✓ |
| Jordan | eVisa / Visa on arrival | 30 days | Visa can be obtained upon arrival, it will cost a total of 40 JOD, obtainable at most international ports of entry and land border crossings. (except King Hussein/Allenby Bridge) | X |
| Kazakhstan | Visa not required | 30 days | | X |
| Kenya | Electronic Travel Authorisation | 90 days | Applications can be submitted up to 90 days prior to travel and must be submitted at least 3 days in advance.; eTA fee is 32.50 USD.; Proof of reservation at the hotel where visitors plan to stay is required (if staying with friends, an invitation letter is also acceptable).; Yellow fever vaccination certificate is required if coming from endemic countries.; Can also be entered on an East Africa tourist visa issued by Rwanda or Uganda. | X |
| Kiribati | Visa not required | 90 days | | X |
| North Korea | Visa required | | Visitors traveling for tourist purposes must hold an authorization to travel, issued by a travel company in Korea (Dem. People's Rep.).; Independent travelers must be accompanied by a tour guide at all times.; Due to security concerns and the risk of arbitrary detention, the Australian government advises its citizens not to visit North Korea. | ✓ |
| South Korea | Electronical Travel Authorization | 90 days | The validity period of a K-ETA is 3 years from the date of approval. | ✓ |
| Kuwait | eVisa / Visa on arrival | 3 months | | X |
| Kyrgyzstan | Visa not required | 60 days | 30 days within any 60-day period.; A single or multiple tourist or business e-Visa for 90 days is also available. | X |
| Laos | eVisa / Visa on arrival | 30 days | 18 (Note: Savannakhet Airport; Lanetoui - Mengkang (China); Meuangmom - Wan Pong (Myanmar); Banvang - Ban Khok Phai (Thailand); Namngeun - Huay Kon (Thailand); Paksan - Bueng Kan (Thailand); Paktaphan - Pak Saeng (Thailand); Pangmon - Ban Huak (Thailand); Phoudou (Thailand); Dak ta ock - Nam Giang (Vietnam); La Lai (Vietnam); Namkan (Vietnam); Namphao - Cau Treo (Vietnam); Namsoy - Na Meo (Vietnam); Naphao - Cha Lo (Vietnam); Pahang - Long Sap (Vietnam); Panghok - Tây Trang (Vietnam); Phoukeua - Bo Y (Vietnam)) of the 33 border crossings are only open to regular visa holders.; e-Visa may be used to enter Laos through the Luang Prabang, Pakse and Vientiane international airports, 3 Thai-Lao Friendship Bridges (Note: Vientiane (Friendship Bridge 1); Savannakhet (Friendship Bridge 2); Bokeo (Friendship Bridge 4)), in Boten (road and railroad), and in Vientiane (at Khamsavath railway station).; Visa on arrival is available at the Luang Prabang, Pakse and Vientiane international airports, 4 Thai-Lao Friendship Bridges (Note: Vientiane (Friendship Bridge 1); Savannakhet (Friendship Bridge 2); Khammouane (Friendship Bridge 3); Bokeo (Friendship Bridge 4)) and 7 border crossings. (Note: Nongnokkheane - Trapeang Kriel (Cambodia); Boten - Bo han (China); Golden Triangle/Samliemkham (Thailand); Khamsavath railway station (Thailand); Namheuang - Ban Na Kraseng (Thailand); Vang tao - Chongmek (Thailand); Dansavan - Lao Bảo (Vietnam)) | X |
| Latvia | Visa not required | 90 days | 90 days within any 180-day period in the Schengen Area. | ✓ |
| Lebanon | Free visa on arrival | 1 month | Visa extendible for 2 additional months.; Granted free of charge at Beirut International Airport or any other port of entry if there is no Israeli visa or seal, holding a telephone number, an address in Lebanon, and a non refundable return or circle trip ticket.; Due to security concerns, the Australian government advises its citizens not to visit Lebanon. | X |
| Lesotho | Visa not required | 14 days | | X |
| Liberia | e-VOA | 3 months | Currently available only upon arrival at the Roberts International Airport (ROB) in Monrovia. | ✓ |
| Libya | eVisa | | Due to safety concerns, Australian government advises its citizens not to visit Libya. | X |
| Liechtenstein | Visa not required | 90 days | 90 days within any 180-day period in the Schengen Area. | ✓ |
| Lithuania | Visa not required | 90 days | 90 days within any 180-day period in the Schengen Area. | ✓ |
| Luxembourg | Visa not required | 90 days | 90 days within any 180-day period regardless of previous time spent in other Schengen countries. | ✓ |
| Madagascar | eVisa / Visa on arrival | 90 days | For stays of 61 to 90 days, the visa fee is 59 USD. | X |
| Malawi | eVisa / Visa on arrival | 30 days | | X |
| Malaysia | Visa not required | 3 months | | ✓ |
| Maldives | Free visa on arrival | 30 days | | X |
| Mali | Visa required | | An average processing time for a tourist visa to Mali upon 3-15 working days is mandatory.; Due to security concerns, the Australian government advises its citizens not to visit Mali. | ✓ |
| Malta | Visa not required | 90 days | 90 days within any 180-day period in the Schengen Area. | ✓ |
| Marshall Islands | Visa on arrival | 90 days | | X |
| Mauritania | eVisa | 30 days | Available at Nouakchott–Oumtounsy International Airport. | X |
| Mauritius | Visa not required | 90 days | | X |
| Mexico | Visa not required | 180 days | | X |
| Micronesia | Visa not required | 30 days | | X |
| Moldova | Visa not required | 90 days | 90 days within any 180-day period. | X |
| Monaco | Visa not required | | | ✓ |
| Mongolia | Visa not required | 30 days | The Ministry of Foreign Affairs of Mongolia has exempted visas for 34 countries from January 2023 to December 2026. | ✓ |
| Montenegro | Visa not required | 90 days | 90 days within any 180-day period. | X |
| Morocco | Visa not required | 3 months | | X |
| Mozambique | eVisa / Visa on arrival | 30 days | Travelers must pay a fee of 190 USD upon entry. | X |
| Myanmar | eVisa | 28 days | Due to ongoing civil unrest and armed conflict, Australian government advises its citizens not to visit Myanmar. | X |
| Namibia | eVisa / Visa on arrival | 3 months / 90 days | | X |
| Nauru | Visa required | | Criminal record and medical fitness certificates are not required for Australian citizens.; Australian citizens are given 7 days to pay a fee AU$ 50 per day in procedure for an application of a new visa to Nauru. | ✓ |
| Nepal | Online Visa / Visa on arrival | 90 days | | X |
| Netherlands | Visa not required | 90 days | 90 days within any 180-day period regardless of previous time spent in other Schengen countries (European Netherlands). | ✓ |
| New Zealand | Visa not required | Indefinitely | Australian citizens traveling on an Australian passport may be granted a New Zealand Resident Visa on arrival entitling the holder to live, work and study indefinitely (pursuant to the Trans-Tasman Travel Arrangement), subject to meeting character requirements.; May enter using eGate.; Electronic Travel Authority not required.; International Visitor Conservation and Tourism Levy not required. | ✓ |
| Nicaragua | Visa not required | 90 days | | X |
| Niger | Visa required | | Visa on arrival at Diori Hamani International Airport if a letter of invitation (Visa Volant) issued by the Ministry of Interior is conferred.; Due to the political instability, the Australian government advises its citizens not to visit Niger. | ✓ |
| Nigeria | eVisa | 30 days | | ✓ |
| North Macedonia | Visa not required | 90 days | 90 days within any 180-day period. | X |
| Norway | Visa not required | 90 days | 90 days within any 180-day period regardless of previous time spent in other Schengen countries (except other Nordic countries). | ✓ |
| Oman | Visa not required / eVisa | 14 days / 30 days | | X |
| Pakistan | eVisa | 3 months | | X |
| Palau | Free visa on arrival | 30 days | | X |
| Panama | Visa not required | 90 days | | X |
| Papua New Guinea | eVisa | 30 days | | X |
| Paraguay | Visa not required | 90 days | | X |
| Peru | Visa not required | 90 days | | X |
| Philippines | Visa not required | 30 days | | X |
| Poland | Visa not required | 90 days | 90 days within any 180-day period in the Schengen Area. | ✓ |
| Portugal | Visa not required | 90 days | 90 days within any 180-day period in the Schengen Area. | ✓ |
| Qatar | Visa not required | 30 days | | X |
| Romania | Visa not required | 90 days | 90 days within any 180-day period in the Schengen Area. | ✓ |
| Russia | Visa required | | Application of an e-Visa for Australian citizens can be submitted online no later than 4 days before the expected date of entry into Russia.; Process in tourist visas for stays with a period of 30 days is acquired.; Due to security concerns, the Russian invasion of Ukraine, and arbitrary detentions, the Australian government advises its citizens not to visit Russia. | ✓ |
| Rwanda | Visa not required | 30 days | Can also be entered on an East Africa Tourist Visa issued by Kenya or Uganda. | X |
| Saint Kitts and Nevis | Electronic Travel Authorisation | 3 months | | X |
| Saint Lucia | Visa not required | 6 weeks | | X |
| Saint Vincent and the Grenadines | Visa not required | 3 months | | X |
| Samoa | Entry permit on arrival | 90 days | | X |
| San Marino | Visa not required | 90 days | | ✓ |
| São Tomé and Príncipe | eVisa | | | X |
| Saudi Arabia | eVisa / Visa on arrival | 90 days | Non-Muslim residents are prohibited from visiting Mecca and its holy sites. Other religious places may also be restricted to Non-Muslim people. | X |
| Senegal | Visa on arrival | 90 days | | X |
| Serbia | Visa not required | 90 days | 90 days within any 180-day period. | X |
| Seychelles | Electronic Border System | 3 months | Application can be submitted up to 30 days before travel.; Visitors must upload a reservation confirmation(s) for each visitor's location of stay in Seychelles.; Yellow fever vaccination certificate is required if coming from endemic countries.; Payment of the fee (EUR 10) by credit or debit card.; Valid for one journey only and it expires once exit the country. | X |
| Sierra Leone | eVisa / Visa on arrival | 3 months / 30 days | | X |
| Singapore | Visa not required | 90 days | | ✓ |
| Slovakia | Visa not required | 90 days | 90 days within any 180-day period in the Schengen Area. | ✓ |
| Slovenia | Visa not required | 90 days | 90 days within any 180-day period in the Schengen Area. | ✓ |
| Solomon Islands | Free Visitor's permit on arrival | 3 months | | X |
| Somalia | eVisa | 30 days | Due to safety concerns, Australian government advises its citizens not to visit Somalia. | X |
| South Africa | Visa not required | 90 days | | X |
| South Sudan | eVisa | | Obtainable online 30 days single entry for 100 USD, 90 days multiple entry for 200 USD and 180 days multiple entry for 350 USD.; Printed visa authorization must be presented at the time of travel.; Due to security concerns, the Australian government advises its citizens not to visit South Sudan. | X |
| Spain | Visa not required | 90 days | 90 days within any 180-day period regardless of previous time spent in other Schengen countries. | ✓ |
| Sri Lanka | ETA / Visa on arrival | 30 days | | X |
| Sudan | Visa required | | Visa on arrival if holding letter of invitation registered in the Sudan with a pre-approval from the Foreign Affairs.; Registration for a visa is obligatory within 3 days of arrival. It can be completed at entry ports.; Visa not required for Sudanese-born citizens.; Due to security concerns, the Australian government advises its citizens not to visit Sudan. | ✓ |
| Suriname | Visa not required | 90 days | An entrance fee of USD 50 or EUR 50 must be paid online prior to arrival.; Multiple entry e-Visa is also available. | X |
| Sweden | Visa not required | 90 days | 90 days within any 180-day period regardless of previous time spent in other Schengen countries. (except other Nordic countries) | ✓ |
| Switzerland | Visa not required | 90 days | 90 days within any 180-day period in the Schengen Area. | ✓ |
| Syria | eVisa | | Due to safety concerns, Australian government advises its citizens not to visit Syria. | ✓ |
| Tajikistan | Visa not required / eVisa | 30 days / 60 days | e-Visa also available.; e-Visa holders can enter through all border points. | X |
| Tanzania | eVisa / Visa on arrival | 90 days | | X |
| Thailand | Visa not required | 60 days | Maximum two visits annually if not arriving by air. | X |
| Timor-Leste | Visa on arrival | 30 days | Not available at all entry points. | X |
| Togo | eVisa | 15 days | | X |
| Tonga | Free visa on arrival | 31 days | | X |
| Trinidad and Tobago | eVisa | 90 days | | X |
| Tunisia | Visa not required | 3 months | | X |
| Turkey | Visa not required | 90 days | | X |
| Turkmenistan | eVisa | | 10-day visa on arrival if holding a letter of invitation provided by a company registered in Turkmenistan with a prior approval from the Foreign Ministry. Visitors can apply to extend their stay for an additional 10 days.; When transiting between two non-bordering countries, visitors can obtain a Turkmenistan transit visa for a five-day stay. This must be applied for in advance at the Turkmenistan Embassy. Visitors must also submit copies of the visas for the country of entry into Turkmenistan and the country of departure from Turkmenistan. Visa fee is 20 USD. | ✓ |
| Tuvalu | Visa on arrival | 1 month | | X |
| Uganda | eVisa | 3 months | Can also be entered on an East Africa Tourist Visa issued by Kenya or Rwanda. | X |
| Ukraine | Visa not required | 90 days | 90 days within any 180-day period.; Due to the ongoing Russian invasion of Ukraine, the Australian government advises its citizens not to visit Ukraine. | X |
| United Arab Emirates | Visa not required | 90 days | May apply using 'Smart Service'. | X |
| United Kingdom and Crown dependencies | Electronic Travel Authorisation | 6 months | Visa also not required if holder has UK ancestry clearance visa.; ETA UK is valid for 2 years.; Adults can use ePassport gates. | ✓ |
| United States | Visa Waiver Program | 90 days | ESTA is valid for 2 years from the date of issuance.; ESTA is also required when entering the country by cruise ship or land.; A Form I-94 is required for entry into the United States by land. It carries a $30 fee and can be obtained either online or upon arrival.; Visa required for nationals of VWP countries who have travelled or been present in Iran, Iraq, Libya, North Korea, Somalia, Sudan, Syria or Yemen at any time on or after 1 March 2011 or Cuba at any time on or after 12 January 2021, or nationals of VWP countries who are also nationals of Iran, Iraq, North Korea, Sudan or Syria. Exceptions apply if the travel was in military or diplomatic service of the VWP country. | ✓ |
| Uruguay | Visa not required | 3 months | | X |
| Uzbekistan | Visa not required | 30 days | | X |
| Vanuatu | Visa not required | 120 days | | X |
| Vatican City | Visa not required | | | ✓ |
| Venezuela | Visa not required | 90 days | Due to safety concerns, Australian government advises its citizens not to visit Venezuela. | X |
| Vietnam | eVisa | | 30 days Visa free when visit Phu Quoc Island.; e-Visa is valid for 90 days and multiple entry. | X |
| Yemen | Visa required | | Due to safety concerns, Australian government advises its citizens not to visit Yemen.; Yemen introduced an e-Visa system for visitors who meet certain eligibility requirements (group travel of 10 or more people, business trips, and transit etc.). | ✓ |
| Zambia | Visa not required | 30 days | Also eligible for a universal visa allowing access to Zimbabwe. | X |
| Zimbabwe | eVisa / Visa on arrival | 1 month | Strictly tourism purposes only.; Also eligible for a universal visa allowing access to Zambia. e-Visa available. | X |

=== Dependent, disputed, or restricted territories ===
Unrecognized countries

| Territory | Conditions of access | Notes |
|---|---|---|
| Abkhazia | Visa required | Tourists from all countries (except Georgia) can visit Abkhazia for a period not exceeding 24 hours as part of an organized tourist group. |
| Kosovo | Visa not required | 90 days |
| Northern Cyprus | Visa not required | 3 months |
| Palestine | Visa not required | Arrival by sea to Gaza Strip not allowed. |
| Sahrawi Arab Democratic Republic | Visa regime undefined | Undefined visa regime in the Western Sahara controlled territory. |
| Somaliland | Visa required | 30 days for 30 USD, payable on arrival. |
| South Ossetia | Visa required | To enter South Ossetia, visitors must have a multiple-entry visa for Russia and register their stay with the Migration Service of the Ministry of Internal Affairs within 3 days. |
| Taiwan | Visa not required | 90 days; May enter using eGate. |
| Transnistria | Visa not required | Registration required after 24 hours. |

Dependent and autonomous territories

| Territory | Conditions of access | Notes |
China
| Hong Kong | Visa not required | 90 days |
| Macau | Visa not required | 30 days |
Denmark
| Faroe Islands | Visa not required | |
| Greenland | Visa not required | |
Finland
| Åland Islands | Visa not required | 3 months |
France
| French Guiana | Visa not required | 3 months |
| French Polynesia | Visa not required | 90 days within 180 days |
| France French West Indies | Visa not required | Includes overseas departments of Guadeloupe and Martinique and overseas collectivities of Saint Barthélemy and Saint Martin. |
| Mayotte | Visa not required | 3 months |
| New Caledonia | Visa not required | 3 months |
| Réunion | Visa not required | 3 months |
| Saint Pierre and Miquelon | Visa not required | 3 months |
| Wallis and Futuna | Visa not required | 3 months |
Netherlands
| Aruba | Visa not required | 30 days, extendable to 180 days |
| Netherlands Caribbean Netherlands | Visa not required | 90 days. Includes Bonaire, Sint Eustatius and Saba. |
| Curaçao | Visa not required | 90 days |
| Sint Maarten | Visa not required | 90 days |
New Zealand
| Cook Islands | Visa not required | 90 days |
| Niue | Visa not required | 30 days |
| Tokelau | Visa required | Processing time for a tourist visa compulsory from 3–4 days. |
United Kingdom
| Akrotiri and Dhekelia | Visa not required | Stays longer than 28 days per 12-month period require a permit. |
| Anguilla | Visa not required | 3 months |
| Bermuda | Visa not required | Up to 6 months, decided on arrival. |
| British Indian Ocean Territory | Special permit required | Special permit required. |
| British Virgin Islands | Visa not required | 30 days, extensions possible |
| Cayman Islands | Visa not required | 6 months |
| Falkland Islands | Visa not required | A visitor permit is normally issued as a stamp in the passport on arrival, The maximum validity period is 1 month. |
| Gibraltar | Visa not required | |
| Montserrat | Visa not required | 6 months |
| Pitcairn Islands | Visa not required | 14 days visa free and landing fee 35 USD or tax of 5 USD if not going ashore. |
| Ascension Island | eVisa | 3 months within any year period. |
| Saint Helena | Visa Free with Payment | |
| Tristan da Cunha | Permission required | Permission to land required for 15/30 pounds sterling (yacht/ship passenger) for Tristan da Cunha Island or 20 pounds sterling for Gough Island, Inaccessible Island or Nightingale Islands. |
| South Georgia and the South Sandwich Islands | Permit required | Pre-arrival permit from the Commissioner required (72 hours/1 month for 110/160 pounds sterling). |
| Turks and Caicos Islands | Visa not required | 90 days |
United States
| American Samoa | Electronic authorization | 30 days |
| Guam | Visa not required | 45 days |
| Northern Mariana Islands | Visa not required | 45 days |
| Puerto Rico | Electronic System for Travel Authorization | Visa not required under the Visa Waiver Program, for 90 days on arrival from overseas for 2 years. ESTA required. |
| U.S. Virgin Islands | Electronic System for Travel Authorization | Visa not required under the Visa Waiver Program, for 90 days on arrival from overseas for 2 years. ESTA required. |
Antarctica and adjacent islands
Special permits required for Bouvet Island, British Antarctic Territory, French Southern and Antarctic Lands, Argentine Antarctica, (Australia) Australian Antarctic Territory, (Antártica Chilena Province) Chilean Antarctic Territory, (Australia) Heard Island and McDonald Islands, (Norway) Peter I Island, (Norway) Queen Maud Land, (New Zealand) Ross Dependency.

Other territories

| Territory | Conditions of access | Notes |
|---|---|---|
| Belarus; Brest and Grodno | Visa not required | Visa-free for 10 days |
| China; Hainan | Visa not required | 30 days. Available at Haikou Meilan International Airport and Sanya Phoenix International Airport. |
| China; Tibet Autonomous Region | TTP required | Tibet Travel Permit required (10 USD). |
| Eritrea outside Asmara | Travel permit required | To travel in the rest of the country, a Travel Permit for Foreigners is required (20 Eritrean nakfa). |
| Galápagos | Pre-registration required | 60 days; Visitors must pre-register to receive a 20 USD Transit Control Card (TCT). |
| Greece; Mount Athos | Special permit required | Special permit required (4 days: 25 euro for Orthodox visitors, 35 euro for non-Orthodox visitors, 18 euro for students). There is a visitors' quota: maximum 100 Orthodox and 10 non-Orthodox per day and women are not allowed. |
| India PAP/RAP | PAP/RAP required | Protected Area Permit (PAP) required for whole states of Nagaland and Sikkim and parts of states Manipur, Arunachal Pradesh, Uttaranchal, Jammu and Kashmir, Rajasthan, Himachal Pradesh. Restricted Area Permit (RAP) required for all of Andaman and Nicobar Islands and parts of Sikkim. Some of these requirements are occasionally lifted for a year. |
| Iran; Kish Island | Visa not required | Tourists for Kish Island do not require a visa. |
| Iraqi Kurdistan | eVisa | Tourists can apply for an e-Visa (30 days) to visit the Iraqi Kurdistan Region. |
| Fiji; Lau Province | Special permission required | Special permission required. |
| France; Clipperton Island | Special permit required | Special permit required. |
| Kazakhstan | Special permission required | Special permission required for the town of Baikonur and surrounding areas in Kyzylorda Oblast, and the town of Gvardeyskiy near Almaty. |
| North Korea outside Pyongyang | Special permit required | People are not allowed to leave the capital city, tourists can only leave the capital with a governmental tourist guide (no independent moving) |
| Malaysia; Sabah and Sarawak | Visa not required | These states have their own immigration authorities and passport is required to travel to them, however the same visa applies. |
| Maldives outside Malé | Permission required | With the exception of the capital Malé, tourists are generally prohibited from visiting non-resort islands without the express permission of the Government of Maldives. |
| Norway; Jan Mayen | Permit required | Permit issued by the local police required for staying for less than 24 hours and permit issued by the Norwegian police for staying for more than 24 hours. |
| Norway; Svalbard | Visa not required | Right to live and work under the Svalbard Treaty. |
| Novorossiya | Restricted area | Crossing from Ukraine requires visit purpose to be explained to Ukrainian passport control on exit and those who entered from Russia are not allowed to proceed further into Ukraine. |
| Russia | Special authorization required | Several closed cities and regions in Russia require special authorization. |
| Sudan outside Khartoum | Travel permit required | All foreigners traveling more than 25 kilometers outside of Khartoum must obtain a travel permit. |
| Sudan; Darfur | Travel permit required | Separate travel permit is required. |
| Tajikistan; Gorno-Badakhshan Autonomous Province | OIVR permit required | OIVR permit required (15+5 Tajikistani Somoni) and another special permit (free of charge) is required for Lake Sarez. |
| United Nations UN Buffer Zone in Cyprus | Access Permit required | Access Permit is required for travelling inside the zone, except Civil Use Areas. |
| United Nations Korean Demilitarized Zone | Access restricted | Restricted zone. |
| United Nations UNDOF Zone and Ghajar | Access restricted | Restricted zone. |
| United States United States Minor Outlying Islands | Special permits required | Special permits required for Baker Island, Howland Island, Jarvis Island, Johnston Atoll, Kingman Reef, Midway Atoll, Palmyra Atoll and Wake Island. |
| Venezuela; Margarita Island | Visa not required | All visitors are fingerprinted. |
| Vietnam; Phú Quốc | Visa not required | 30 days |
| Yemen outside Sanaa or Aden | Special permission required | Special permission needed for travel outside Sanaa or Aden. |

== Reciprocity issues ==
Some countries regard Australia's requirement for obtaining an Electronic Travel Authority (ETA) prior to travel as being equivalent to offering visa-free travel when deciding whether to grant the same to Australians wishing to enter their territory.

The United States, for example, offers their Visa Waiver Program to Australian passport-holders, and one of the conditions for joining this scheme is that "Governments provide reciprocal visa-free travel for U.S. citizens for 90 days for tourism or business purposes". However, the United States has required from January 2009 a similar ETA from citizens of Australia and some more countries. This system is not called a visa, but Electronic System for Travel Authorisation, therefore the US allows visa-free travel for Australians.

As of December 1998, Japan has also granted visa-free access to Australians. Other ETA eligible countries and territories including Canada, Hong Kong, Malaysia, Singapore, South Korea (90 days) and Taiwan (90 days) also grant visa-free access to Australians while Brunei grants Australians a 30-day visa on arrival.

== Additional rules ==
=== Visa exemptions for Schengen states ===
==== A stay in the Schengen Area as a whole of more than three months (but no more than three months in any individual member state) ====
The Australian Government has signed bilateral visa waiver agreements with a number of the individual countries who are Schengen signatories, which allow Australian citizens to spend up to three months in the relevant country, without reference to time spent in other Schengen signatory states. Since these agreements continue to remain valid despite the implementation of the Schengen agreement, the European Commission has confirmed that in practice if Australians visit Schengen countries which have signed these types of bilateral agreements with Australia, then the terms of these agreements override the conditions normally imposed as a result of the Schengen visa exemption agreement. However, amendments are under consideration to restrict exit from the Schengen area only through the territory of the Member State which is a Contracting Party to the bilateral agreement and the authorities of which have extended the stay.

Australia has individual bilateral visa waiver agreements with the following Schengen signatories:

- Austria
- Belgium
- Denmark
- Finland
- France
- Germany
- Iceland
- Italy
- Luxembourg
- Netherlands
- Spain
- Norway
- Sweden

Consequently, Australian citizens can visit the above Schengen member states visa-free for periods of up to three months in each country.

If, however, an Australian citizen then visits another Schengen state not included in the list above, the restriction of no more than three months out of a 6-month period in the Schengen area as a whole applies. Therefore, if an Australian citizen has already spent three months in one or more of the above Schengen countries, any visits to another Schengen country without a bilateral visa waiver agreement with Australia may lead to difficulties with local law enforcement agencies (e.g. being accused of having overstayed upon leaving a Schengen country which is not in the list above).

==== A stay in the Schengen Area as a whole of up to three months ====
Australian citizens are classified as 'Annex II' foreign nationals, and so are permitted to stay visa-free in the 26 member states of the Schengen Area as a whole — rather than each country individually — for a period not exceeding 3 months every 6 months.

During the visa exemption period, Australian citizens are permitted to work in Belgium, Bulgaria, Denmark, Finland, Germany, Iceland, Lithuania, Luxembourg, the Netherlands, Norway, Poland, Slovenia and Sweden.

In addition, Australian citizens intending to stay and work in Estonia for up to 90 days can do so without a visa as long as the employer has completed a 'registration of short-term employment'.

==== A stay in the Schengen Area as a whole of more than 3 months (and more than 3 months in an individual member state) ====
In general, any person who is not a European Union, European Economic Area or Swiss citizen and who wishes to stay in a Schengen member state for more than 3 months is required to obtain a national long-stay 'D' visa and/or a residence permit.

Australian citizens aged 18–30 (or 18–35 in some cases) are able to obtain a national long-stay 'D' visa and/or a residence permit from some Schengen member states on the basis of a working holiday (see below). Schengen member states also issue national long-stay 'D' visas and residence permits for other reasons to those fulfilling criteria laid out in their national immigration policies (e.g. skilled workers, students, au pair).

In general, the national long-stay 'D' visa/residence permit needs to be obtained in advance through the member state's embassy/consulate. However, some Schengen member states offer exceptions for Australian citizens.

Austria allows Australian citizens to enter the country without a visa and to apply for a temporary residence permit or a 'Red-White-Red Card' (issued to permanent immigrants) after arrival, rather than in advance through an Austrian embassy/consulate.

The Czech Republic allows Australian citizens to apply for a work visa under a special scheme known as a 'Green Card' (rather than a 'Blue Card' or work permit which is required by most non-EU citizens). The application for a Green Card can be lodged at any Czech embassy/consulate (or, in some circumstances, within the Czech Republic if the applicant is already resident there) and is usually processed within 60 days. Note that 'Green Cards' are no longer issued after 24 June 2014.

Germany permits Australian citizens intending to stay in the country for over 3 months to enter without a visa and to apply for a residence permit after arrival (whilst for many other non-EEA and Swiss citizens, a residence permit and visa for a stay over 3 months must be applied for in advance at a German foreign mission).

Estonia permits Australian citizens to stay and work in Estonia for more than 90 days but less than 6 months as long as they obtain a category 'D' long-stay visa at a cost of €80 in advance at an Estonian foreign mission after the employer has completed a 'registration of short-term employment'. Australian citizens intending to stay and work in Estonia for more than 6 months can apply for a temporary residence permit for employment after arrival in the country.

Hungary allows Australian citizens who wish to stay for more than 90 days in the country to apply for a residence card from the regional directorate of the Office of Immigration and Nationality within 90 days of arrival and do not need to obtain a residence permit prior to arrival in Hungary (unlike most other non-EEA and Swiss foreign nationals).

Latvia permits Australian citizens intending to stay in the country for over 3 months as self-employed persons or as businesspersons to enter Latvia without a visa and to apply for a residence permit after arrival (whilst for many non-EEA and Swiss citizens, an application for a residence permit must be lodged in advance at a Latvian foreign mission).

Netherlands exempts Australian citizens from the requirement to obtain a Schengen category "D" visa (the visa issued for long term stays in The Netherlands of over 90 days, known in Dutch as the "MVV" visa) - an exemption which goes beyond the visa waiver afforded to most other non-EEA and non-Swiss foreign nationals who are usually only given a visa waiver of up to 90 days in a 180-day period.

Norway permits Australian citizens who have qualifications as a skilled worker to stay in the country without a visa for up to 6 months to seek employment as a skilled worker or a specialist (except as a religious leader/teacher or an ethnic cook), as long as they register with the police within 3 months of arriving in Norway.

=== Visa exemptions and requirements for the United Kingdom ===
Australian citizens are able to visit the United Kingdom for up to 6 months (or 3 months if they enter from Ireland) without the need to apply for a visa as long as they fulfil all of the following criteria:

- they do not work during their stay in the UK
- they must not register a marriage or register a civil partnership during their stay in the UK
- they can present evidence of sufficient money to fund their stay in the UK (if requested by the border inspection officer)
- they intend to leave the UK at the end of their visit and can meet the cost of the return/onward journey
- they have completed a landing card and submitted it at passport control unless in direct transit to a destination outside the Common Travel Area
- if under the age of 18, they can demonstrate evidence of suitable care arrangements and parental (or guardian's) consent for their stay in the UK

However, even though, strictly speaking, they are not required to apply for a visa if they satisfy all of the above criteria, an Australian citizen who falls into any of the following categories has been strongly advised by the UK Border Agency (replaced by UK Visas and Immigration) to apply for a visa prior to travelling to the UK if they:

- have any unspent criminal convictions in any country
- have previously been refused or breached the terms of any entry to the UK, or been deported or otherwise removed from the UK
- have previously applied for a visa and been refused one
- have been warned by a UK official that they should obtain a visa before travelling to the UK

Australian citizens who were born before 1983 and qualify for the right of abode are able to live and work in the United Kingdom indefinitely.

Australian citizens with a grandparent born either in the United Kingdom, Channel Islands or Isle of Man at any time or in Ireland on or before 31 March 1922 can apply for UK Ancestry Entry Clearance, which enables them to work in the UK for five years, after which they can apply to settle indefinitely.

Australian citizens aged 18 to 30 can apply for a Youth Mobility Scheme visa which allows them to pursue a working holiday in the UK for two years.

In June 2021, the Australian and UK governments announced that their reciprocal working holiday scheme would soon be expanded to allow citizens of both countries aged 18 to 35 live and work in the other country for up to three years. These changes are expected to either in 2023 or by mid-2024 at the latest.

=== Visa exemption for New Zealand ===
By virtue of the Trans-Tasman Travel Arrangement, Australian citizens are exempt from the requirement to hold a permit on arrival in New Zealand and may reside or work for an indefinite period as long as:

- they present a valid Australian passport OR hold a foreign passport showing their Australian Citizen Endorsement or Australian Citizen Declaratory Visa (either with a label or a confirmation letter) as evidence of their Australian citizenship
- they have no criminal convictions
- they have no untreated tuberculosis
- they have not been deported, excluded or removed from any country

=== Travel ban ===
It is an offence for Australians to travel or remain in Declared Areas.

== APEC Business Travel Card ==
Full members of the scheme Transitional members (United States, Canada)

Holders of an APEC Business Travel Card (ABTC) travelling on business do not require a visa to the following countries:

- Brunei^{2}
- Chile^{2}
- China^{4}
- Hong Kong^{4}
- Indonesia^{4}
- Japan^{2}
- Malaysia^{2}
- Mexico^{1}
- New Zealand^{2}
- Papua New Guinea^{4}
- Peru^{2}
- Philippines^{4}
- Russia^{3}
- Singapore^{4}
- South Korea^{2}
- Taiwan^{2}
- Thailand^{2}
- Vietnam^{4}

_{1 - Up to 180 days}
_{2 - Up to 90 days}
_{3 - Up to 90 days in a period of 180 days}
_{4 - Up to 60 days}

The card must be used in conjunction with a passport and has the following advantages:

- No need to apply for a visa or entry permit to APEC countries, as the card is treated as such (except by Canada and United States)
- Undertake legitimate business in participating economies
- Expedited border crossing in all member economies, including transitional members

== Consular protection of Australian citizens abroad ==
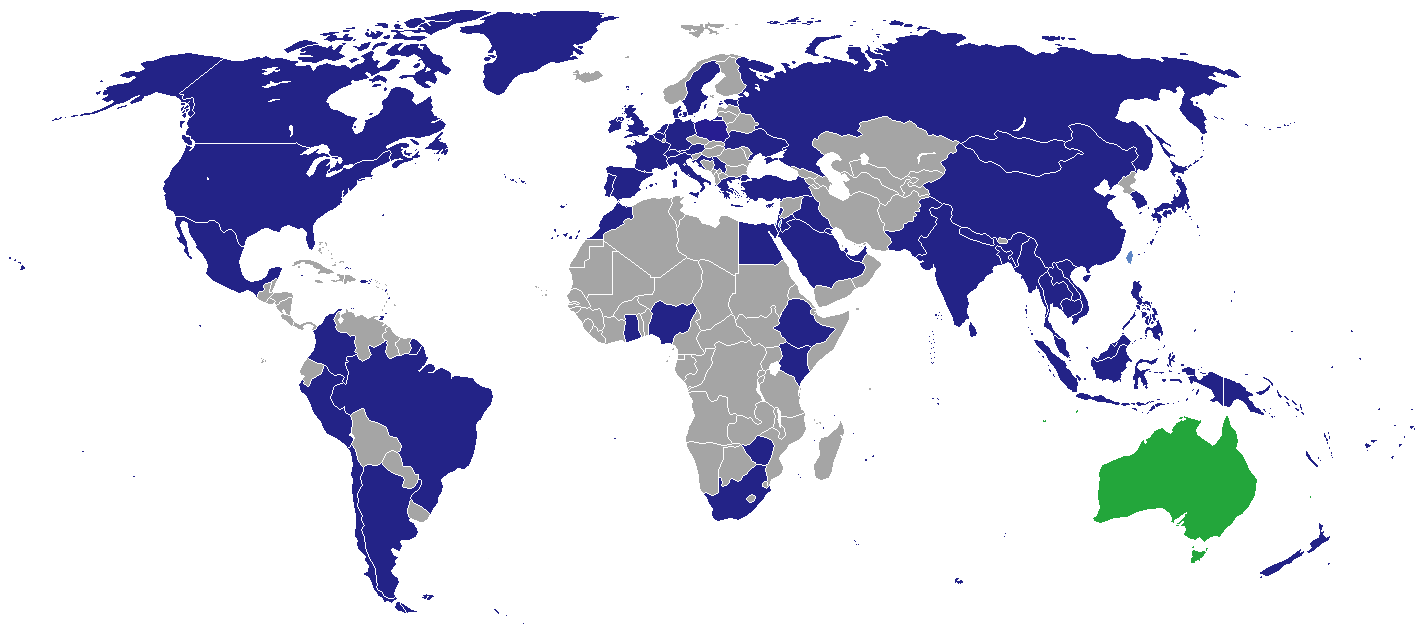
Diplomatic missions of Australia

There are currently over 100 Australian missions overseas. In some countries Australians may also receive consular assistance from Canadian missions under the Canada–Australia Consular Services Sharing Agreement.

== Foreign travel statistics ==
The following table is composed of data from the Australian Bureau of Statistics estimating the number of Australian residents returning from international trips less than one year in duration in 2025.

| Country | Returns |
|---|---|
| New Zealand | 1,451,000 |
| New Caledonia (France) | 10,870 |
| Papua New Guinea | 70,620 |
| Vanuatu | 66,280 |
| Fiji | 412,730 |
| Samoa | 44,680 |
| United Kingdom | 637,510 |
| Ireland | 84,090 |
| Austria | 21,980 |
| France (excluding New Caledonia) | 167,840 |
| Germany | 102,620 |
| Netherlands | 29,230 |
| Switzerland | 35,700 |
| Sweden | 19,370 |
| Italy | 317,550 |
| Portugal | 32,660 |
| Spain | 115,180 |
| Croatia | 37,070 |
| Greece | 153,880 |
| Poland | 19,760 |
| Russia | 7,740 |
| Iran | 18,950 |
| Israel | 14,090 |
| Lebanon | 46,300 |
| Turkey | 60,120 |
| United Arab Emirates | 83,120 |
| Cambodia | 36,840 |
| Thailand | 639,080 |
| Vietnam | 519,780 |
| Indonesia | 1,750,370 |
| Malaysia | 302,380 |
| Philippines | 291,780 |
| Singapore | 392,610 |
| China (excluding Hong Kong) | 692,510 |
| Hong Kong | 178,600 |
| Taiwan | 85,100 |
| Japan | 951,950 |
| South Korea | 137,140 |
| Bangladesh | 31,270 |
| India | 599,180 |
| Nepal | 53,420 |
| Pakistan | 55,660 |
| Sri Lanka | 135,430 |
| Canada | 167,890 |
| United States of America | 712,690 |
| Brazil | 26,810 |
| Chile | 17,070 |
| Peru | 19,020 |
| Mexico | 19,850 |

== Non-visa restrictions ==
=== Blank passport pages ===
Many countries require a minimum number of blank pages to be available in the passport being presented, typically one or two pages. Endorsement pages, which often appear after the visa pages, are not counted as being valid or available.

=== Vaccination ===
Cover of the new International Certificate of Vaccination issued by the Bureau of Quarantine in the Philippines since 2021

The African countries of Angola, Benin, Burkina Faso, Burundi, Cameroon, Central African Republic, Democratic Republic of the Congo, Republic of the Congo, Côte d'Ivoire, Gabon, Ghana, Guinea-Bissau, Mali, Niger, Sierra Leone and Togo, South Sudan and Uganda, along with French Guiana in South America, require all incoming passengers older than nine months to one year, to have a current International Certificate of Vaccination or Prophylaxis.

Some other countries require vaccination only if the passenger is coming from an infected area or has visited one recently or has transited for 12 hours in those countries: Algeria, Botswana, Cabo Verde, Chad, Djibouti, Egypt, Eswatini, Ethiopia, Gambia, Ghana, Guinea, Lesotho, Libya, Equatorial Guinea, Eritrea, Madagascar, Malawi, Mauritania, Mauritius, Mozambique, Namibia, Nigeria, Papua New Guinea, Seychelles, Somalia, South Africa, Sudan, Tunisia, Uganda, Tanzania, Zambia and Zimbabwe.

=== Passport validity length ===
Very few countries, such as Paraguay, just require a valid passport on arrival.

However many countries and groupings now require only an identity card – especially from their neighbours. Other countries may have special bilateral arrangements that depart from the generality of their passport validity length policies to shorten the period of passport validity required for each other's citizens or even accept passports that have already expired (but not been cancelled).

Some countries, such as Japan, Ireland and the United Kingdom, require a passport valid throughout the period of the intended stay.

In the absence of specific bilateral agreements, countries requiring passports to be valid for at least 6 more months on arrival include Afghanistan, Algeria, Anguilla, Bahrain, Bhutan, Botswana, British Virgin Islands, Brunei, Cambodia, Cameroon, Cape Verde, Cayman Islands, Central African Republic, Chad, Comoros, Costa Rica, Côte d'Ivoire, Curaçao, Ecuador, Egypt, El Salvador, Equatorial Guinea, Fiji, Gabon, Guinea Bissau, Guyana, Haiti, India, Indonesia, Iran, Iraq, Israel, Jordan, Kenya, Kiribati, Kuwait, Laos, Madagascar, Malaysia, Marshall Islands, Mongolia, Myanmar, Namibia, Nepal, Nicaragua, Nigeria, Oman, Palau, Papua New Guinea, Peru, Philippines, Qatar, Rwanda, Samoa, Saudi Arabia, Singapore, Solomon Islands, Somalia, Sri Lanka, Sudan, Suriname, Tanzania, Thailand, Timor-Leste, Tokelau, Tonga, Turkey, Tuvalu, Uganda, United Arab Emirates, Vanuatu, Venezuela, and Vietnam.

Countries requiring passports valid for at least 4 months on arrival include Micronesia and Zambia.

Countries requiring passports with a validity of at least 3 months beyond the date of intended departure include Azerbaijan, Bosnia and Herzegovina, Honduras, Montenegro, Nauru, Moldova and New Zealand. Similarly, the EEA countries of Iceland, Liechtenstein, Norway, all European Union countries (except Ireland) together with Switzerland also require 3 months validity beyond the date of the bearer's intended departure unless the bearer is an EEA or Swiss national.

Countries requiring passports valid for at least 3 months on arrival include Albania, North Macedonia, Panama, and Senegal.

Bermuda requires passports to be valid for at least 45 days upon entry.

Countries that require a passport validity of at least one month beyond the date of intended departure include Eritrea, Hong Kong, Lebanon, Macau, the Maldives and South Africa.

==== Maximum passport age ====
Countries of the Schengen area require non-EU passports to be less than 10 years old upon entry.

=== Criminal record ===
Some countries, including Australia, Canada, Fiji, New Zealand and the United States, routinely deny entry to non-citizens who have a criminal record, while others impose restrictions depending on the type of conviction and the length of the sentence.

=== Persona non grata ===
The government of a country can declare a diplomat persona non grata, banning them from entering the country or expelling them if they have already entered. In non-diplomatic use, the authorities of a country may also declare a foreigner persona non grata permanently or temporarily, usually because of unlawful activity.

=== Israeli stamps ===
Kuwait, Lebanon, Libya, and Yemen do not allow entry to people with passport stamps from Israel or whose passports have either a used or an unused Israeli visa, or where there is evidence of previous travel to Israel such as entry or exit stamps from neighbouring border posts in transit countries such as Jordan and Egypt.

To circumvent this Arab League boycott of Israel, the Israeli immigration services have now mostly ceased to stamp foreign nationals' passports on either entry to or exit from Israel (unless the entry is for some work-related purposes). Since 15 January 2013, Israel no longer stamps foreign passports at Ben Gurion Airport. Passports are still (as of 22 June 2017) stamped at Erez when passing into and out of Gaza.

Iran refuses admission to holders of passports containing an Israeli visa or stamp that is less than 12 months old.

=== Biometrics ===
Several countries mandate that all travellers, or all foreign travellers, be fingerprinted on arrival and will refuse admission to or even arrest travellers who refuse to comply. In some countries, such as the United States, this may apply even to transit passengers who merely wish to change planes rather than go landside.

Fingerprinting countries/regions include Afghanistan, Argentina, Brunei, Cambodia, China, Ethiopia, Ghana, Guinea, India, Japan, Kenya (both fingerprints and a photo are taken), Malaysia upon entry and departure, Mongolia, Saudi Arabia, the Schengen Area, Singapore, South Korea, Taiwan, Thailand, Uganda, the United Arab Emirates and the United States.

Many countries also require a photo be taken of people entering the country. The United States, which does not fully implement exit control formalities at its land frontiers (although long mandated by its own legislation), intends to implement facial recognition for passengers departing from international airports to identify people who overstay their visa.

Together with fingerprint and face recognition, iris scanning is one of three biometric identification technologies internationally standardised since 2006 by the International Civil Aviation Organization (ICAO) for use in e-passports and the United Arab Emirates conducts iris scanning on visitors who need to apply for a visa. The United States Department of Homeland Security has announced plans to greatly increase the biometric data it collects at US borders. In 2018, Singapore began trials of iris scanning at three land and maritime immigration checkpoints.

== See also ==
- Visa policy of Australia
- Australian passport
