= Australian passport =

Travel document

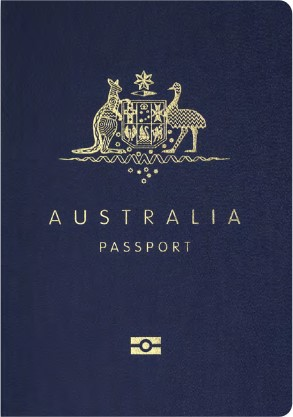
- The front cover of a current Australian biometric passport

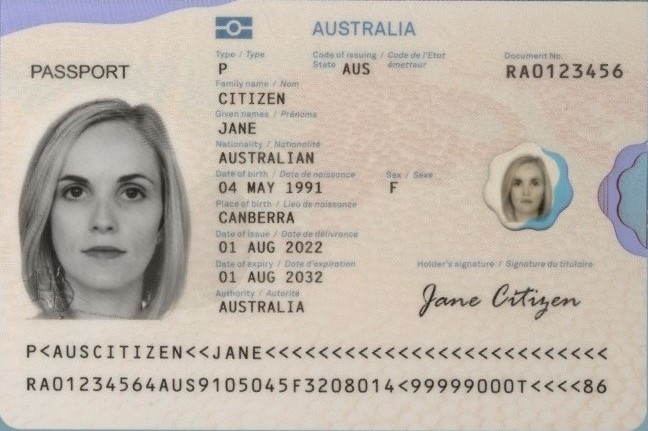
- The polycarbonate photo page of a current R series Australian passport
- Type: Passport
- Issued by: Australian Passport Office (DFAT); Australia Post
- First issued: 1901 (first version following federation); 1984 (machine-readable passport); 24 October 2005 (biometric passport); September 2022 (current version)
- In circulation: 15 million (2025)
- Purpose: Identification & travel
- Valid in: All countries
- Eligibility: Australian citizenship
- Expiration: 10 years for adults 16+; 10 or 5 years for adults aged 75+; 5 years for children under 16
- Cost: Adult (16+): 10-year passport: A$422; Adult 75+ (optional) 5-year passport: A$208; Child (Under 16): 5-year passport: A$208

An Australian passport is a travel document issued by the Commonwealth of Australia to individuals holding any form of Australian nationality. The document facilitates access to consular assistance from Australian embassies around the world, and are issued by the Australian Passport Office, an agency of the Department of Foreign Affairs and Trade (DFAT) and Australia Post. As of February 2026, Australian citizens had visa-free or visa on arrival access to 182 countries and territories, ranking the passport seventh in the world for travel freedom according to the Henley Passport Index.

Since 24 October 2005, Australia has issued only biometric passports, called ePassports, which have an embedded microchip that contains the same personal information that is on the colour photo page of the passport, including a digitised photograph. All Australian passport variants are biometric. SmartGates have been installed in Australian airports to allow Australian ePassport holders and ePassport holders of several eligible countries to clear immigration controls more rapidly, and facial recognition technology has been installed at immigration gates.

Approximately 2.3 million passports are issued annually, with 15 million Australian citizens (about 56% of the population) possessing a valid Australian passport. Ten-year passports cost A$422, making them the most expensive passports in the world.

== History ==
Before 1901, Australia consisted of six separate British colonies. Passport usage was not common, and if required British or other national passports were used. In the 19th century, paroled convicts were issued a type of internal passport called "ticket of leave", which enabled them to move freely between the colonies. In 1901, the six colonies joined to form the Commonwealth of Australia, although Australians retained British nationality. It was only in 1912 that the first federal passport regulations were introduced, and the passports issued by the Australian government still bore the words "British Passport" on the cover until 1967. During World War I, the monitoring and identifying of those crossing international borders was regarded as critical to the security of Australia and its allies, and the War Precautions Act 1914 required all persons over 16 years of age, on leaving Australia, to possess some passport.

Australian nationality came into existence on 26 January 1950 when the Nationality and Citizenship Act 1948 came into force, and Australian passports began to distinguish between Australian citizens and other British subjects. British subjects, who were not Australian citizens, continued to be entitled to an Australian passport. The term "British subject" had a particular meaning in Australian nationality law. The term encompassed all citizens of countries included in the list contained in the Nationality and Citizenship Act 1948. The list of countries was based on, but was not identical with, those countries (and their colonies) which were members of the Commonwealth from time to time. The list was amended from time to time as various former colonies became independent countries, but the list in the Act was not necessarily up-to-date as far as to constitute exactly a list of countries in the Commonwealth at any given time. This definition of "British subject" meant that, for the purposes of Australian nationality law, citizens of countries which had become republics, such as India, were classified as "British subjects". The words "British Passport" were removed from the covers of Australian passports in 1967.

In 1981, the Commonwealth, Queensland, New South Wales and Victorian governments set up the Stewart Royal Commission to inquire into various drug trafficking and related criminal activities, but which spent much of its time examining how criminals were using and abusing the passport system for criminal purposes. The Commission published its final report in 1983, making recommendations on how to prevent such abuses, most of which were acted upon by the federal government. The report's recommendations included that applicants for a passport attend a Passport Office and that mailed applications cease; that passports be issued only to citizens, so that British subjects would cease to be entitled to a passport; that birth certificates not be accepted as a sufficient proof of identity; that passports cease to be issued through travel or other agents; and that all persons who change their name, whether by choice, marriage or adoption, be required to register the change with State Registrars of births, deaths and marriages. The legal category of British subject was abolished in 1984 by the Australian Citizenship (Amendment) Act 1984, and Australian passports began to be issued exclusively to Australian citizens, though existing passports held by non-citizen British subjects continued to be valid until each expired.

In 1980, large bound book registers were replaced by a computerised processing and registration system, called the Passport Issue and Control System (PICS). Since 1984, to speed up processing of incoming and outgoing passengers and data entry, Australia has been issuing passports with machine readable lines, to ICAO Document 9303 standard. Since 24 October 2005, Australia has issued only biometric passports, called ePassports, which have an embedded RFID microchip that contains the same personal information that is on the colour photo page of the passport, including a digitised photograph. Australia was only the fourth country in the world (after Malaysia, Thailand and Sweden) to introduce biometric passports. All Australian passports are now biometric, all pre-2006 passports having now expired. SmartGates have been installed in Australian airports to allow Australian ePassport holders, and ePassport holders of several other countries, to clear immigration controls more rapidly, and facial recognition technology has been installed at immigration gates to capture and save a biometric profile of passport holders as well as to compare against the immigration database and watchlist. Australia does not use fingerprinting of incoming passengers, as is done by some other countries.

=== Summary of passport series ===
- In 1917, 'X' series passports issued.
- In 1937, 'A' series passports issued. Passport cover included the Commonwealth Coat of Arms and the words 'British Passport Commonwealth of Australia'.
- In 1949, after Australian nationality was created, passports began to distinguish between Australian citizens and other British subjects. The passports contained manually inserted photos with wet seals and raised embossed seals over the photo as security features. Two types of passport were issued:
1. 'B' series passports – issued (within Australia only) to British subjects who were not Australian citizens.
2. 'C' series passports – issued to Australian citizens.
- In 1950, 'E' series passport replaces 'B' and 'C' series.
- In 1964, 'G' series passport introduced, with the St Edward's Crown at the top of the cover, the word 'Australia' followed by the Australian Coat of Arms, and the words 'British Passport' at the bottom.
- In 1967, the words 'British Passport' removed from passports but retain the Crown. The word 'Australia' appears below the Crown, followed by the Australian Coat of Arms and the word 'Passport'.
- In 1975, responsibility for Australian passport functions were transferred to the Department of Foreign Affairs (since 1987, the Department of Foreign Affairs and Trade), from the then Department of Labor and Immigration.
- Before 1983, a married woman's passport application had to be authorised by her husband.
- In 1983, the department partnered with Australia Post to enable the issue of Australian passports at most Australia Post outlets.
- In 1984, 'T' series passport introduced, with Crown emblem removed from cover. These were the first to have a laminate built into the document.
- In 1986, single identity passports introduced, so that children could no longer be included on a parent's passport.
- In 1988, 'H' and 'J' series passports issued with Bicentennial logo. And until 1988, a woman could apply for and receive a passport in her married name, before she was actually married.
- In 1994, digitised colour printing of photograph and signature on the glue side of the laminate introduced.
- In 1995, 'L' series passports introduced, with kangaroo motif security laminate. The personal data pages initially included a photograph and a cut out piece of paper with the holder's signature under a sheet of adhesive laminate.
- From approximately 1998, the personal data page for 'L' series passports colour laser printed under a sheet of adhesive laminate.
- From 27 November 2003, 'M' series passport issued, which included enhanced security features. The personal data page printed by ink-jet onto the adhesive surface of the security laminate, the laminate itself containing a holographic design.
- From October 2005, 'M' series passports issued as a biometric or ePassport. Electronic passport logo printed under the passport number on the personal data page. The front cover printed in gold ink.
- Since May 2009, 'N' series passports issued as a biometric or ePassport. The passport was black instead of blue and had a slight font and case change to the word 'Passport' on the front cover. The front cover printing was in silver. Additional fraud counter-measures were included including a 'Ghost Image' and 'Retro-Reflective Floating Image' on the laminated page. Each page featured images of Australia printed throughout the document making every visa page unique and more difficult to reproduce.
- In late June 2014, 'P' series passports issued with innovative security features that make it even more difficult to forge. They have an Australian flag blue with gold embossed cover, printed using the same technologies as Australian banknotes. Visible security features include a new security laminate with the world's first colour floating image.
- From September 2022, 'R' series passports issued incorporate works by Indigenous artists, it has a high security data page made of hard polycarbonate, making the passport harder to forge and less susceptible to damage. The visa pages show 17 Australian landscapes in colour.

== Types of passport ==
Different types of passports (P series)

Different type of travel-related documents

The Australian Government issues passports to provide an internationally accepted attestation of their citizens' identity. To facilitate this global recognition, several types of passports are issued.

These are broadly issued in these categories:

- Ordinary passport
- Diplomatic passport
- Official passport
- Emergency passport

Certain non-passport travel documents may also be issued, with eligibility not limited to citizens:

- Convention Travel Document
- Certificate of Identity
- Document of Identity
- Provisional Travel Document

Beyond these, other documents for travel are issued in limited circumstances: ImmiCard, PLO56 (M56), Document for Travel to Australia (DFTTA). These are issued to protection or humanitarian visa holders, or persons in similar circumstances warranting their issue.

Passports and Documents of Identity are ordinarily worth 70 points in the 100 point check system, and can be used as an authoritative identity document throughout Australia. Passports issued with full validity can be used as an identity document for up to two years after their expiry.

=== Ordinary passport ===
These are the passports most commonly issued to Australian citizens. An applicant must satisfy the identity and citizenship requirements. When they are unable to meet these requirements, a Limited Validity Passport (LVP) or Document of Identity may be compassionately issued. LVPs are identical to ordinary passports, but are valid for up to 12 months.

Ordinary passports are ordinarily valid for 5 or 10 years. Children under 16 years of age are issued 5 year passports, and adults aged 75 or over may choose a 5 or 10 year validity. Other adult applicants are normally issued passports with a 10-year validity. Exceptions to this exist, such as in the case of concurrent passports.

As of 2024, ordinary passports have 34 usable visa pages. A frequent traveller variant with 66 visa pages was phased out in December 2017 due to decreased demand as many countries stopped using physical visas or stamps.

=== Diplomatic and official passport ===
These are issued to people employed by or acting on behalf of the Australian Government, and are primarily for individuals in defined categories and roles, required to represent the Australian Government overseas in an official capacity. These passports may sometimes be issued to dependents of the principal applicant, where necessary to facilitate their travel or safety.

These passports may only be issued to Australian citizens whose role or purpose of travel fits within the Ministerial Guidelines. Issuance is tightly controlled, due to the significance of formally representing an individual as acting overseas on behalf of the Australian Government.

Unlike Ordinary passports, individuals have certain legislative and contractual obligations to the Australian Government when using or holding these passports. These passports may be cancelled without notice, if used outside the relevant provisions in the Ministerial Guidelines.

=== Emergency passport ===
These are issued at overseas posts to facilitate the urgent travel of Australian citizens who meet all requirements but cannot wait three weeks for the issue of a full validity passport. These passport do not include a passport chip as they are issued by overseas posts that do not have the capability to produce ePassports. Because they are not a biometric travel document, travel on an these passport may require a visa, even where Australian citizens can usually travel visa-free.

Australian citizens who cannot meet all requirements for an ordinary passport, but can satisfy the citizenship and identity requirements, or need to travel urgently and cannot wait for an ordinary passport. Issuance is strictly controlled, particularly where usual requirements cannot be met.

They are valid for up to 12 months, though normally they are valid for 7 months.

=== Special circumstance passports ===
In limited circumstances, Australian citizens may be issued passports outside of the usual requirements. Such passports will always be issued in one of the above categories: ordinary, official or diplomatic. Other than for an emergency passport, their appearance is identical.

==== Concurrent passport ====
A concurrent passport is an additional passport issued to an individual who already holds a valid passport of the same category (ordinary, official or diplomatic). Issuance of these is very tightly controlled, and granted to enable travel in exceptional circumstances.

Concurrent passports are most often granted when traveling (or transiting) a country that will not accept evidence of travel to certain places, or where significant delays will result in having to wait for the return of a passport following (unrelated) visa issuance. Other circumstances may be considered, requiring authorisation by more senior staff.

These passports are valid for up to 3 years, except that an emergency passport is valid for up to 12 months. The validity period will usually be limited to the duration of travel needs plus 6 months.

==== Limited validity passport ====
These are issued to Australian citizens who cannot provide full documentation, provided their identity and citizenship have been confirmed. They are issued to applicants with incomplete or inconsistent documentation, to allow them to travel in the interim. They are identical to regular passports, but with shorter validity. They are valid for up to 12 months, and available from within Australia only.

LVPs are most commonly offered to applicants with incomplete or inconsistent documentation around name or gender, such as following a name change. These applicants may hold cardinal documents, such as a birth certificate, differing from their current identity, without sufficient documentation to corroborate the difference.

On completion of a full application and satisfaction of the usual requirements, a LVP may be exchanged for an ordinary passport, free of charge.

== Physical appearance ==
The current series Australian passport is blue, with the Australian coat of arms emblazoned in at the top of the front cover. "AUSTRALIA" is written below the coat of arms and, below it, "PASSPORT" is written. Toward the bottom of the cover the international e-passport symbol. The standard passport contains 42 visa pages.

=== Identity information page ===
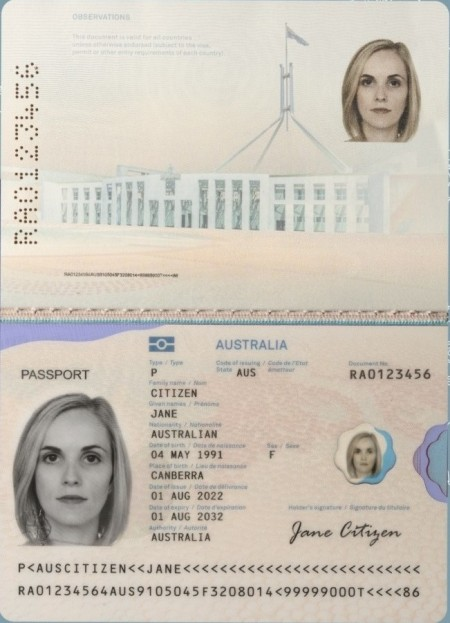
Data and observation page of current R series Australian passport

The Australian passport includes the following data:

- Photo of passport holder
- Type (of document, "P" for "personal")
- Code of issuing state (listed as "AUS" for "Australia")
- Document No.
- Family name
- Given names
- Nationality ("Australian")
- Date of birth
- Sex (M, F or X)
- Place of birth (only the city or town is listed, even if born outside Australia)
- Date of issue
- Date of expiry
- Holder's signature
- Authority ("Australia" if issued in Australia, or the name of the issuing diplomatic mission if issued overseas – e.g. London)

The information page ends with the machine readable zone.

=== Passport note ===
The passports contain inside the front cover a note that is addressed to the authorities of all countries and territories, identifying the bearer as a citizen of Australia and requesting that the bearer be allowed to pass and be treated according to international norms:

The Governor-General of the Commonwealth of Australia, being the representative in Australia of His Majesty King Charles the Third, requests all those whom it may concern to allow the bearer, an Australian Citizen, to pass freely without let or hindrance and to afford him or her every assistance and protection of which he or she may stand in need.

Passports issued during the reign of Queen Elizabeth II (1952–2022):

The Governor-General of the Commonwealth of Australia, being the representative in Australia of Her Majesty Queen Elizabeth the Second, requests all those whom it may concern to allow the bearer, an Australian Citizen, to pass freely without let or hindrance and to afford him or her every assistance and protection of which he or she may stand in need.

=== Languages ===
The passport is printed in English. French translation is found on the identity information.

=== Biometric chip ===
The embedded chip stores the owner's digitised photograph, name, sex, date of birth, nationality, passport number, and the passport expiry date. This is the same information that appears on the printed information page of every passport. Facial recognition technology was introduced with the release of the ePassport to improve identity verification and reduce identity-related fraud.

=== Sex and gender diverse ===
Australian Government policy is to record gender and not sex. Australian travel documents allow for recording of non-binary gender, one of fewer than 10 countries known to do so. Replacement passports are issued for free to applicants whose details have changed in the course of gender transition.

Applicants may choose to have the "Sex" (this name being an ICAO requirement) field on their passport recorded as "M", "F", or "X". While unavailable on passports due to ICAO requirements, a "Document of Identity" may be issued with the sex field blank.

The sex recorded does not need to match that on a birth certificate or any other documents. For those without revised identity documents, who have not previously been issued a passport in the desired gender, a brief statement by a registered doctor or psychologist is sufficient. Where unable to get a letter from a doctor or psychologist, applicants are encouraged to inform the APO, so alternative arrangements can be considered.

Administrative policy of the APO and Department of Foreign Affairs aim to prevent unnecessary distress or offence. Refusal of applications from sex and gender diverse applicants, for lack of documentation or otherwise, is prohibited. Staff are required to not ask for extra information or documents, when applications are made. After lodgement, applications from sex and gender diverse applicants are required to be handled at all times by Executive Level officers with suitable sex and gender diverse training.

=== Features ===
- Microprinting – for example, horizontal lines on the notice/bearer's information pages are made up of microprinted words.
  - In L-series passports, the first verse of Advance Australia Fair is used.
  - In M-series passports, the words are from Waltzing Matilda.
  - In N-series passports, the lines are made up of the word "Australia" repeated.
  - N-series passports also feature microprinted words from Clancy of the Overflow on the visa pages.
- The laminate of the identity information page on M-series and later passports contains retro-reflective floating images of kangaroos.

== Applications for a passport ==
The 100-point personal identification system applies to new applicants for an Australian passport, and an Australian passport can in turn be used as an identification document of the passport holder (worth 70 points in the 100-point check scheme).

The 100-point personal identification system does not apply to a renewal of a passport, in Australia or overseas by using the PC7 form. To be eligible for the PC7 form, your most recently issued adult passport is required, and it must be issued with a validity of at least 2 years (i.e. it is not an Emergency Passport or a limited validity document); AND was issued in your current name, date of birth and sex; AND has not been lost, stolen or damaged; AND is current or expired less than three years ago.

The demanded Australian passport photo dimensions are:

- 35–40 mm (1.4–1.6 in) – width
- 45–50 mm (1.8–2.0 in) – height
- 32–36 mm (1.3–1.4 in) – maximum size of the face from chin to the top of the head

== Renewal ==
Australian citizens, aged 18 years or over who have an adult Australian passport that was valid for at least two years when issued, and was issued on or after 1 July 2000, in the current name, date of birth and sex or have a child Australian passport that was valid for at least two years when issued, and was issued on or after 1 July 2005, and that were 16 years or over at the time of issue may apply online for a renewal. If overseas, this may be done by contacting the nearest Australian diplomatic mission.

Renewals are not available for lost or stolen passports, in which case an application for a new passport must be made.

== Refusal to issue passport ==
Under the Australian Passports Act 2005, the Minister for Foreign Affairs has the power to refuse, cancel or suspend a passport on a number of grounds including national security or health. In addition, a court can order an accused in a criminal matter, or any other person, to surrender their passport, for example, as a condition of grant of bail or otherwise.

In May 2017, the Turnbull government successfully reached a deal with Derryn Hinch's Justice Party to allow the Department of Foreign Affairs and Trade to revoke the passports of 20,000 convicted child sex offenders listed on Australia's national child offender register, of which about 3,200 offenders with lifetime reporting requirements were to be permanently denied the opportunity to obtain a passport and hence the ability to travel outside Australia for life. This was described as a "world-first" passport-ban policy intended to combat child sex tourism perpetuated by Australian citizens especially in developing countries.

== Five Nations Passport Group ==
Since 2004, Australia has participated in the Five Nations Passport Group, an international forum for cooperation between the passport issuing authorities in the United Kingdom, Canada, New Zealand, and the United States to "share best practices and discuss innovations related to the development of passport policies, products and practices".

== Visa requirements ==
Visa requirements for Australian citizens holding ordinary passports Australia Freedom of movement Visa not required / ESTA / ETA Visa on arrival eVisa Visa available both on arrival or online Visa required

An Australian passport does not, in itself, entitle the holder to enter another country. To enter another country, the traveller must comply with the visa and entry requirements of the other countries to be visited, which vary from country to country and may apply specifically to a particular passport type, the traveller's nationality, criminal history, or many other factors.

As of October 2025, Australian citizens had visa-free or visa on arrival access to 184 countries and territories, ranking the Australian passport eighth in the world in terms of travel freedom (tied with the United Kingdom and Malta), according to the Henley Passport Index. It showed a drop of two placements from 2024 where it ranked 6th, although since 2006 it has kept a steady placement between 9th and 6th place.

== Foreign travel statistics ==
The following table is composed of data from the Australian Bureau of Statistics estimating the number of Australian residents returning from international trips less than one year in duration in 2025.

Country	Returns
New Zealand	1,451,000
New Caledonia (France)	10,870
Papua New Guinea	70,620
Vanuatu	66,280
Fiji	412,730
Samoa	44,680
United Kingdom	637,510
Ireland	84,090
Austria	21,980
France (excluding New Caledonia)	167,840
Germany	102,620
Netherlands	29,230
Switzerland	35,700
Sweden	19,370
Italy	317,550
Portugal	32,660
Spain	115,180
Croatia	37,070
Greece	153,880
Poland	19,760
Russia	7,740
Iran	18,950
Israel	14,090
Lebanon	46,300
Turkey	60,120
United Arab Emirates	83,120
Cambodia	36,840
Thailand	639,080
Vietnam	519,780
Indonesia	1,750,370
Malaysia	302,380
Philippines	291,780
Singapore	392,610
China (excluding Hong Kong)	692,510
Hong Kong	178,600
Taiwan	85,100
Japan	951,950
South Korea	137,140
Bangladesh	31,270
India	599,180
Nepal	53,420
Pakistan	55,660
Sri Lanka	135,430
Canada	167,890
United States of America	712,690
Brazil	26,810
Chile	17,070
Peru	19,020
Mexico	19,850

== Declared area offence ==
It is an offence under Australian law for Australians to enter, or remain in, certain regions designated as 'declared areas'. The Government may declare an area (but not a whole country) if it considers terrorists are operating in that area. The maximum penalty is 10 years imprisonment. However, it is a defence if a person can show they entered or remained in the area for a legitimate purpose prescribed in the regulations.

As of October 2026, there were no active 'declared areas'.

Former declared areas were:

- Mosul District, Nineveh Governorate, Iraq, Effective 3 March 2015, renewed 2 March 2018, and revoked 19 December 2019.
- Raqqa Governorate, Syria, Effective 5 December 2014, and revoked 29 November 2017.

== See also ==
- List of passports
- Visa requirements for Australian citizens
