= Australian Convention Travel Document =

Australian travel document for refugees

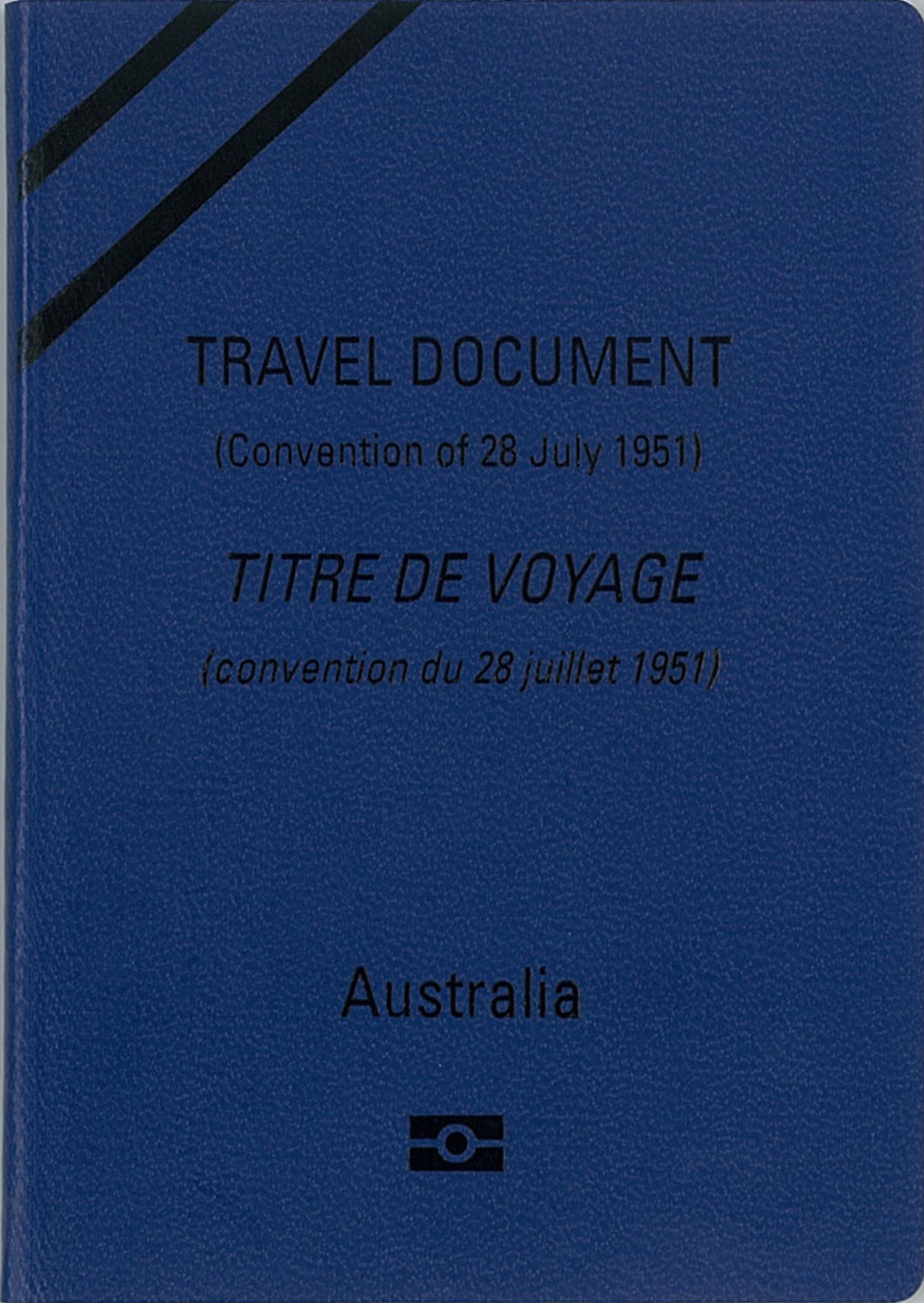
- The front cover of an Australian biometric Convention Travel Document
- Type: Refugee travel document
- Issued by: Australia
- Purpose: International travel document for refugees
- Eligibility: refugees reside in Australia
- Expiration: 2 years (for holders of permanent protection visa); 2 years (for holders of temporary protection visa)

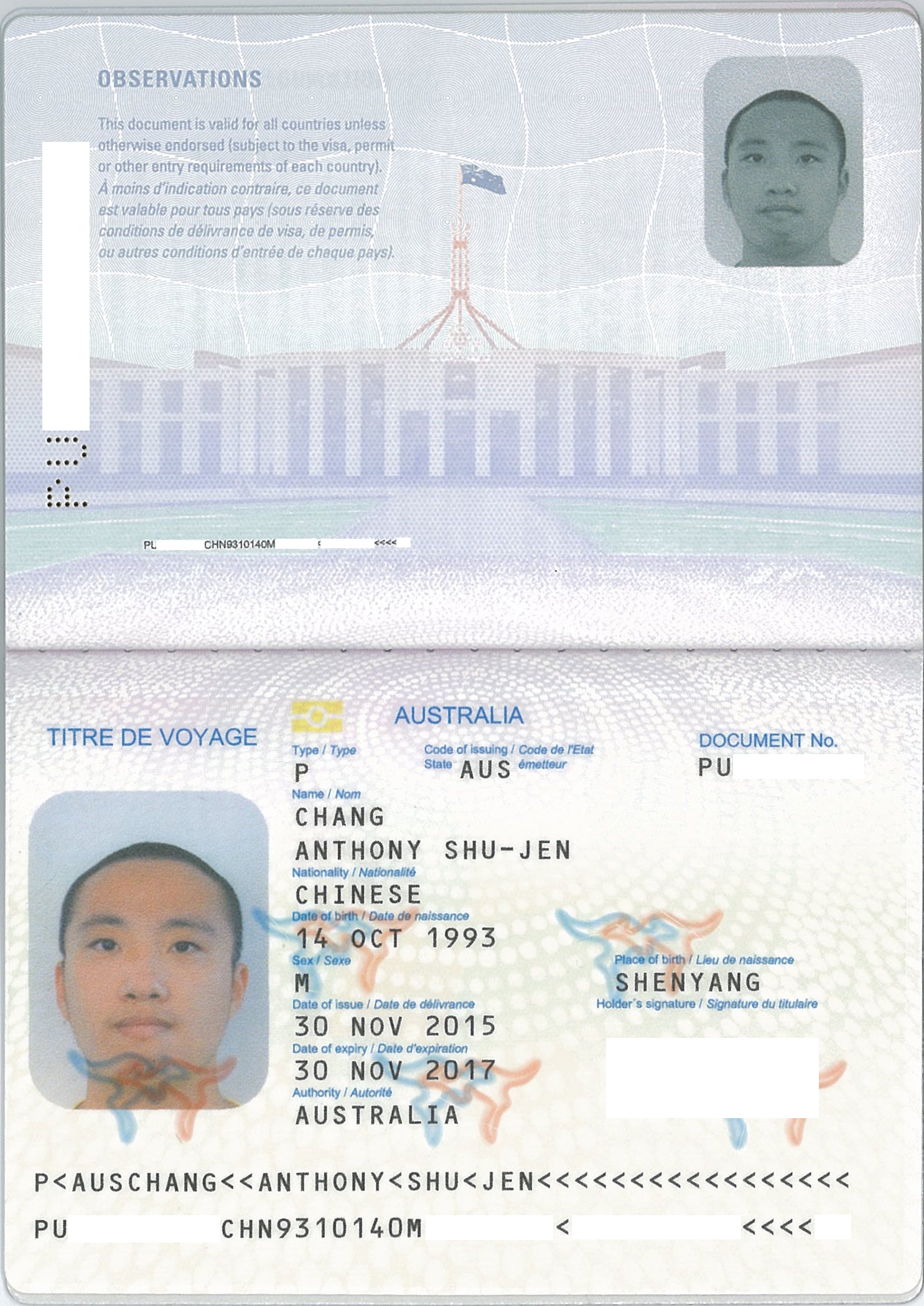
The bio-data page of an Australian CTD issued to a Chinese refugee.

An Australian Convention Travel Document (CTD) is a biometric refugee travel document issued for international travel purpose by the Australian Department of Foreign Affairs and Trade to individuals recognised as refugees residing in Australia under the 1951 Convention Relating to the Status of Refugees. The CTD enables the holder to leave Australia, to travel outside Australia (with limitations) and to re-enter Australia. However, as a CTD is not a regular national passport, some problems may be encountered by the holder from time to time, at time due to non-familiarity of airline staff.

== Eligibility ==
A holder of a permanent or temporary protection visa residing in Australia can apply for a CTD if he or she can demonstrate refugee status under the 1951 Convention and the 1967 Protocol Relating to the Status of Refugees.

== Use ==
Most countries accept Australian CTDs for visa issuance purposes, with the following exceptions:

As of 13 January 2016, Indonesia did not accept all non-passport documents including CTD for visa application.

Qatar does not accept Travel documents as of 15 May 2025

It is also reported that Taiwan did not accept Chinese nationals holding Australian CTD to apply for Taiwanese visa.

=== Visa-free access or Visa-on-arrival ===
Since Australian CTD is not a regular national passport, most countries and territories require visas prior to arrival.

The following countries and territories provide visa-free access or visa on arrival:

==== Asia ====
Countries and territories	Entry rights	Notes
Macau	Visa on arrival	30 days maximum, visa issued upon arrival for MOP100

==== Europe ====
Countries and territories	Entry rights	Notes
Germany	Visa not required	90 days Schengen (require CTD valid for at least 4 months)
Hungary	Visa not required	90 days
Slovakia	Visa not required	
Slovenia	Visa not required	

==== Oceania ====
Countries and territories	Entry rights	Notes
New Zealand	Freedom of movement	For holders of Australian permanent visas only (according to Trans-Tasman Travel Arrangement)

== See also ==
- Australian Certificate of Identity
- Travel document
