= Swiss Travel Document =

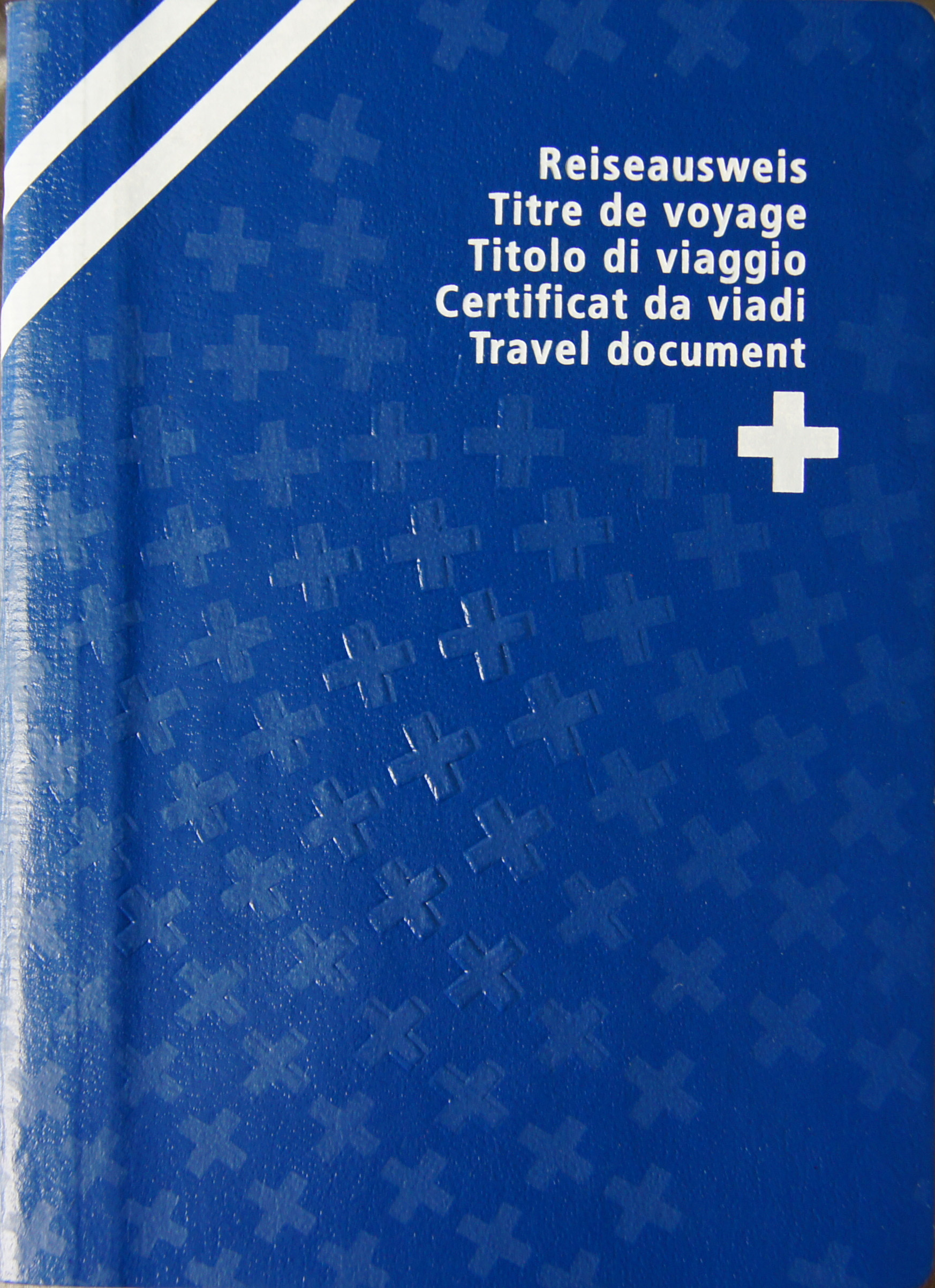

A Swiss travel document allows travel by political refugees and foreigners who do not have national passports and are living in Switzerland with a permit designated B (Right to Stay) or C (permanent resident). The holder of a travel document for refugees or passport for foreigners is allowed to return to Switzerland during the period of validity of the document (as long as the residence permit or provisional admission granted before the start of the journey has not expired in the meantime). The refugee travel document does not entitle the holder to visit his State of origin or provenance (art. 8 para. 3 ODV).

The period of validity of a refugee travel document and passport for foreigners is five years (art. 9 ODV) for adults, and three years for children who had not reached three years of age when the document was issued.
