= Australian Certificate of Identity =

Travel document

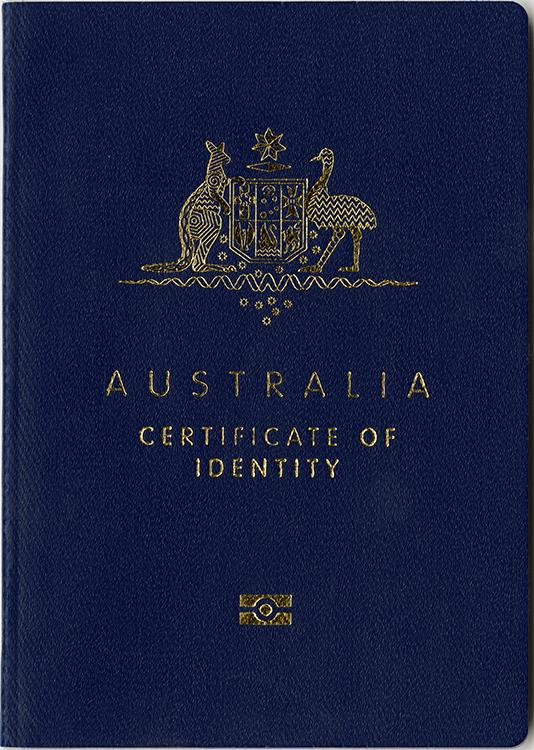
- The front cover of a contemporary Australian biometric Certificate of Identity

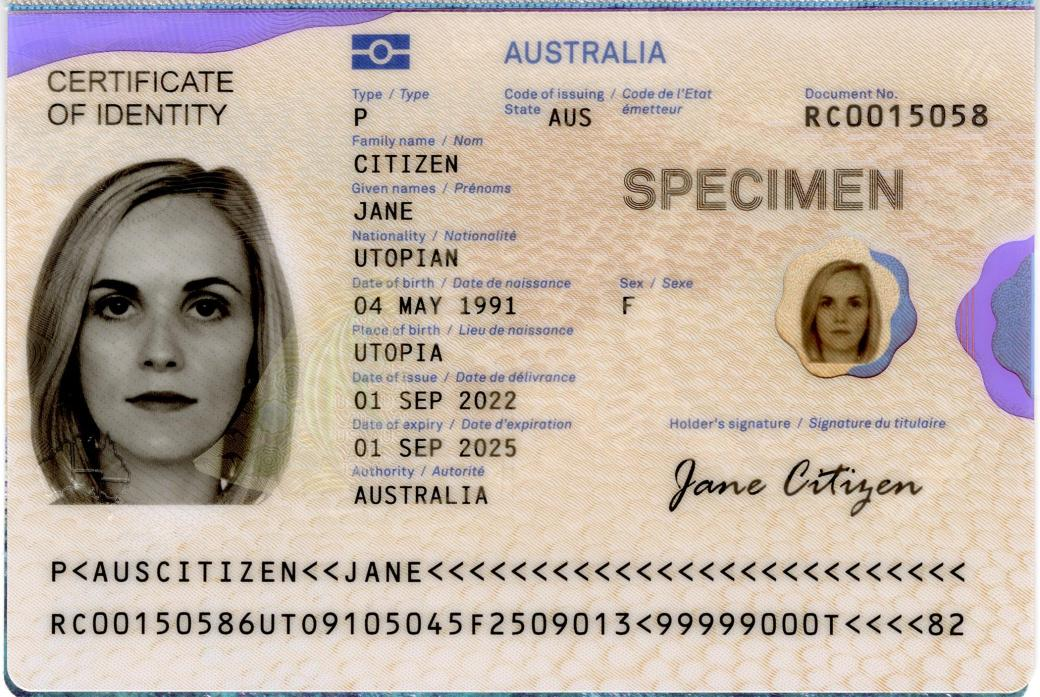
- A polycarbonate biographical data page an Australian biometric Certificate of Identity
- Type: Travel document
- Issued by: Australia
- First issued: September 2022 (current version)
- Purpose: International travel document
- Eligibility: Non-Australian citizens
- Expiration: Maximum of 3 years

The Australian Certificate of Identity (COI) is a biometric travel document issued by the Department of Foreign Affairs and Trade to individuals who are not Australian citizens and are about to leave Australia or one of its territories.

It should not be confused with the Document of Identity, which conversely is intended mainly for use by Australian citizens in circumstances where it would be unnecessary or undesirable to issue a passport.

== Eligibility ==
A person can apply for a COI if:

- not an Australian citizen; and
- about to leave Australia; and
- either stateless; or
- unable to obtain a valid travel document from your country of nationality.

== Document note ==
The Australian Certificate of Identity contains a note on the inside of the front cover which words the following in English:

This Certificate of Identity is issued for the sole purpose of providing the holder with a travel document that can serve in lieu of a national passport. It is issued without prejudice to and no way affects the nationality of the holder. It does not constitute authority to re-enter Australia. If the holder returns to the country of which the holder claims to be a national and is able to obtain a valid document from that country, this Certificate of Identity ceases to be valid and must be surrendered to the issuing authority.

and in French:

Ce certificat d'identité est délivré dans le seul but de fournir à son titulaire un document de voyage pouvant tenir lieu de passeport national. Il est délivré sans préjudice et n'affecte en rien la nationalité du titulaire. Cela ne constitue pas une autorisation pour rentrer en Australie. Si le titulaire retourne dans le pays dont il prétend être ressortissant et est en mesure d'obtenir un document valide de ce pays, ce certificat d'identité cesse d'être valable et doit être remis à l'autorité émettrice.

== Use ==
Holders of a COI who are refugees or stateless persons and legally resident in Australia can enter Germany, Hungary and Slovenia visa-free. Holders of a COI who are refugees (but not stateless persons) legally resident in Australia can enter Slovakia visa-free. The maximum length of stay under these visa exemptions is 90 days in a 180-day period.

== See also ==
- Australian Convention Travel Document
- Australian Document of Identity
- Australian passport
