= Australian Document of Identity =

Travel document

- The front cover of a contemporary Australian Document of Identity
- Type: Travel document
- Issued by: Australia
- Purpose: International travel document
- Eligibility: Certain Australian citizens and Commonwealth citizens
- Expiration: Maximum of 3 years

The Australian Document of Identity (DOI) is a travel document issued by the Department of Foreign Affairs and Trade to Australian citizens and some Commonwealth citizens in specific and rare circumstances. It is not intended to be a broadly used identity document in Australia, nor does it generally provide evidence of citizenship or residency.

The Australian Certificate of Identity is a related document issued for use by certain persons who do not hold Australian or Commonwealth citizenship.

== Purpose ==
The primary purpose of the Document of Identity is to allow an Australian citizen to travel to Norfolk Island without the need for a passport. By the Australian Passports Determination 2015 a Document of identity is also issued to Australian citizens to whom it is unnecessary or undesirable to issue a passport and, under compassionate circumstance, to non-Australian Commonwealth nationals who are unable obtain a valid travel document from their country or countries of nationality. Examples of this include: Australian citizens who have been denied a passport due to them having an outstanding arrest warrant, Australian citizens who request a document of identity instead of a passport, Australian citizens who are transgender, Australian citizens being repatriated or deported to Australia or extradited, and Australian citizens whose travel the Minister believes should be restricted.

== Eligibility ==
A person in one of the following can apply for a DOI:

- An Australian citizen to whom the issue of an Australian passport is unnecessary or undesirable
- A Commonwealth citizen who cannot obtain a valid travel document for the country or countries of which he/she has nationality for compassionate reasons when he/she needs to travel urgently

== Validity ==
Documents of Identity are issued free to travel to Norfolk Island, but other Documents of Identity are usually only for a single journey, and for a limited period. Many countries do not recognize a Document of Identity as a valid travel document. Furthermore, possession of a currently-valid Australian passport excludes the holder from applying for a Document of Identity.

== See also ==
- Australian Certificate of Identity
- Australian passport
