= Immigration to Hong Kong =

Immigration to Hong Kong is the process by which people migrate to the Chinese special administrative region of Hong Kong for the purpose of residing there. The region has its own immigration policy, governing how such migration may be carried, including for those immigrating from mainland China.

Originally a sparsely populated area of farming and fishing villages, During the First Opium War, Hong Kong was initially ceded to the British by the Qing Empire, in the Convention of Chuenpi. However, both countries were dissatisfied and did not ratify the agreement. After more than a year of further hostilities, Hong Kong Island was formally ceded to the United Kingdom in the 1842 Treaty of Nanking.

From 1898 to 1997, Hong Kong was under a 99-year lease to the United Kingdom, and within this period there was a refugee wave from the People's Republic of China to British Hong Kong, primarily between 1949 and 1979.

== Immigration detention in Hong Kong ==
The Immigration Department in Hong Kong detains around 10,000 migrants annually for immigration control and other reasons as stipulated in the Immigration Ordinance (Cap. 115). In Hong Kong, immigration detention is a form of administrative detention; the decision to deprive an individual of liberty is made by government officials, not courts.

=== Relevant legislation ===
- Immigration Ordinance (Cap. 115): Reasons for immigration detention
- Immigration (Places of Detention) Order (Cap. 115B): Places where immigration detainees will be held
- Immigration (Treatment of Detainees) Order (Cap. 115E): Governs the treatment of detainees at Castle Peak Bay Immigration Centre
- Immigration Service (Treatment of Detained Persons) Order (Cap. 331C): Governs the treatment of detainees at Ma Tau Kok Detention Centre
- Prison Rules (Cap. 234A): Governs the treatment of immigration detainees at Tai Tam Gap Correctional Institution

=== Places of detention ===
There are four main immigration detention facilities in Hong Kong: Castle Peak Bay Immigration Centre (CIC), Ma Tau Kok Detention Centre (MTKDC), Tai Tam Gap Correctional Institution (TGCI), and Nei Kwu Correctional Institution (NKCI). In addition to these three facilities, immigration detainees can also be held at any police station, some hospitals, border points, and prisons. The Immigration (Places of Detention) Order (Cap. 115B) lays out the places of detention of immigration detainees and the relevant legislation that governs their treatment at each respective location. All in all, there are over 100 locations of immigration detention.

CIC holds adult immigration detainees and functions as a long-term detention centre. MTKDC holds detainees for short-term transfers. Both CIC and MTKDC are under the authority of the Immigration Department.

TGCI is a recent addition to Hong Kong's immigration detention facilities. A previously defunct prison, it was recommissioned as an immigration detention facility on 28 May 2021. TGCI holds only adult male persons including non-refoulement claimants, in particular persons deemed “security risks” by the Hong Kong government. Notably, TGCI is run by the prison authority, the Hong Kong Correctional Services, and not the Immigration Department. TGCI is also the first facility representing the ‘smart prison initiative’.

NKCI is the latest immigration detention facility. It was converted to into an immigration detention centre for on 18 May 2023. NKCI holds adult female persons under immigration powers, specifically the Immigration Ordinance.

=== Treatment of detainees ===
The treatment of detainees held at CIC is subject to the Immigration (Treatment of Detainees) Order (Cap. 115E) while treatment of detainees held at MTKDC is subject to the Immigration Service (Treatment of Detained Persons) Order (Cap. 331C).

On the other hand, the treatment of detainees held at TGCI and NKCI are subject to the Prison Rules (Cap. 234A), which is the same legislation governing the treatment of prisoners in Hong Kong.

=== Notable coverage ===
In 2021, Hong Kong's public broadcaster Radio Television Hong Kong produced a documentary on immigration detention as part of their Hong Kong Connection (Chinese: 鏗鏘集) series. The documentary included an interview with a former detainee who revealed concerning rights violations that had occurred within the detention walls, including being held down and blindfolded during physical beatings, and forced to kneel and be handcuffed during meals. The documentary also included interviews with human rights lawyers and detention staff who spoke about solitary confinement in the 'padded room'.

In the same year, Stand News produced a series of articles on detention conditions at the then newly reopened Tai Tam Gap Correctional Institution. The Secretary for Security criticized the news outlet for "biased, smearing and demonising" the smart prison initiative. Stand News closed down operations soon after

=== Recent developments ===
In 2021, the Immigration Ordinance was amended to, among other reasons, prevent potential non-refoulement claimants from arriving in Hong Kong. One of the amendments lowered the threshold for long periods of immigration detention by including administrative factors as justifications, including whether many non-refoulement claims are being processed and even if “there are situations beyond the control of ImmD”. The amendments also allowed for increased access to weapons for detention staff despite very low numbers of physical confrontations in immigration detention. Civil society advocates have raised concerns that the amendments will limit procedural fairness for non-refoulement claimants such as by potentially barring them from accessing interpreters in legal proceedings, liaising with home countries to facilitate deportation prior to final conclusion of their applications, and restricting the time allowed for the appeal stage

Since 2021, more than 170,000 Hongkongers have moved to the United Kingdom under the British National (Overseas) visa scheme. From late 2022, Hong Kong expanded its talent admission programmes to address labour shortages. By February 2026, these schemes had admitted 278,506 applicants and 254,021 dependants. Of the more than 410,000 applications approved over the past three years, approximately 300,000 came from mainland China.

==== Impacts of COVID-19 pandemic ====
Cases of COVID-19 in detention staff and detainees have led to suspension of visits from family and friends to detention centres.

== Immigration categories ==
=== Skilled immigrants ===
Quality Migrant Admission Scheme (QMAS) is a program that seeks to attract highly skilled persons to settle in Hong Kong. An applicant does not need to obtain a job offer in advance before entering into Hong Kong on a "skilled immigrants" transfer. Two sets of points system are used to evaluate applicants. These are the Achievement Based Points Test and the General Points Test.

Top Talent Pass Scheme is a program that seeks to attract persons who have a high income or have a degree from a top university to settle in Hong Kong. Like QMAS, an applicant does not need to obtain a job offer in advance before entering into Hong Kong.

=== Family class ===
Permanent residents can sponsor family members to immigrate to Hong Kong. The family member sponsored by the Permanent Resident must be either "their spouse, or an unmarried dependent child under the age of 18, or a parent aged 60 years or above".

=== Suspended categories ===
==== Capital investment ====
Under this category, investors from outside had to have net assets of no less than HK$10 million (US$1,300,000) to which they are entitled throughout the 2 years before submitting their application. (This amount was increased from HK$6.5M on 14 October 2010, and is to be reviewed every three years.) The Capital Investment Entrant Scheme was suspended on 15 January 2015 and replaced with the New Capital Investment Entrant Scheme on 1 March 2024.

== Opposition ==
Pro-democracy politician Gary Fan has been frequently calling for the government to take back the approval rights on One-way Permits from Chinese authorities and to reduce the quota of such permits. Fan also refers to immigrants from mainland China and the quota of 150 daily permits as "the root of the housing problem".

In January 2013, Gary Fan and Claudia Mo formed a group called "HK First". They co-sponsored a controversial ad which claimed that reducing immigration would help the people of Hong Kong to get to the bottom of the housing problem, while rejecting claims of bias or discrimination against mainlanders, despite condemnation from the Equal Opportunities Commission. Fan later introduced a motion on adhering to the need to "put Hong Kong people first" in formulating policies, but the motion was ultimately defeated.

Many political parties in Hong Kong are opposed to large-scale mainland Chinese immigration citing its impact on freedom and locals resources, especially in primary schools, public housing and certain jobs. These parties include most of pro-democracy parties such as Neo Democrats, Hong Kong Indigenous and Youngspiration. Many pro-democracy parties have stated that they don't oppose legal migration from mainland China but have urged to take back control of One-way permit.

A 2012 poll found more than half (51%) of Hong Kongers thought the number of mainland immigrants allowed into Hong Kong should decrease. Only 16% thought immigration should increase.

== See also ==
- Waves of mass migrations from Hong Kong
- Demographic history of Hong Kong
- Castle Peak Bay Immigration Centre
- Ma Tau Kok Road Government Offices
- Tai Tam Gap Correctional Institution
- Nei Kwu Correctional Institution
