= 2000s in Hong Kong =

The 2000s in Hong Kong began a new millennium under the People's Republic of China (PRC).

== Background ==
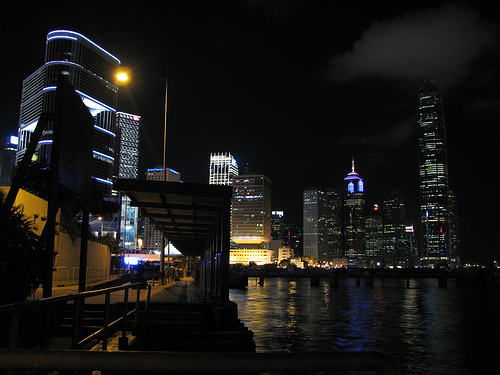
Hong Kong Island, 2006

After the transfer of sovereignty, Hong Kong faced a series of problems, both political and economical. The government carried out a series of reforms to adopt a more modern ideology and democracy, but faced a number of difficulties. Despite a transfer of power to China, the citizens participate in how their government is run, and the region maintains some degree of autonomy. Media in Hong Kong has not come under state control, though a number of citizens believe the media practices self-censorship. The economy would also begin the period with a rise in unemployment rate from 2.2% in 1997 to 4.4% in 2000, and 7.9% in 2003. The economy had gradually recovered since 2004 and the overall unemployment rate fell to 3.6% in 2008, however the overall figure rose again to 5.4% in 2009 due to the global economic downturn in the last quarter of 2008.

== Politics ==
The two major political camps of the decade are the Pro-Beijing camp and the Pro-democracy camp.

=== Article 23 ===
In 2003, the government proposed an anti-subversion law titled Article 23 of the Hong Kong Basic Law. Some people feared that the proposal would erode freedom of press, religion, and association. The unpopularity of Chief Executive Tung Chee-Hwa and his administration, combined with the dissatisfaction about economy recession and the pandemic control, prompted an estimated 500,000 - 1,000,000 people to march on 1 July 2003, making it the largest since the Tiananmen Square protests of 1989. The proposal fell after the several pro-government lawmakers withdrew their support to pass the bill. The resignation of Liberal Party chief James Tien from the Executive Council on 6 July 2003 caused the eventual withdrawal of the legislation and the break-up of the "ruling alliance" of the Chief Executive. The security secretary, Regina Ip, who was heavily criticised for her arrogant and condescending handling of the proposed law, was forced to resign.

=== Other marches ===
For the first time in Hong Kong's history, on 1 July 2006, the People's Liberation Army marched through the city. The display was one of power and symbolism staged by 19 pro-Beijing groups. The march was part of a celebration demonstration that began in Victoria Park.

=== Chief executive ===
Many calls were made for the resignation of Tung Chee-hwa, a leader who was blessed by the Chinese Communist Party, Jiang Zemin. Tung remained in the office until 10 March 2005, 20 months after the march against Article 23. Hong Kong's Basic Law permitted Tung to serve another 3 years, some suspected Beijing forced him to resign due to widespread public disapproval and his perceived lacklustre leadership. The 2005 election filled the seat with Donald Tsang who was the No. 2 ranking official, Chief Secretary, and career civil servant during British colonial rule.

=== Media control in Hong Kong ===
A survey conducted by the Hong Kong Journalists Association found that 58.4% of journalists think press freedom in HK has deteriorated since the handover, mainly as a result of self-censorship and government's tighter grip on information flow. Direct Internet censorship in Hong Kong has not been a major issue. In 2009 HK was still ranked 48 by the international Press Freedom Index. This is still far ahead of the People's Republic of China. Other self-censorship events include the 2009 Hong Kong Broadcasting Authority forum where major station TVB was labeled as CCTVB with censored news like the mainland's CCTV. The local Citizens' Radio was raided by the Office of the Telecommunications Authority (OFTA) after being deemed illegal.

== Finance ==
The 1997 Asian financial crisis caused a deflationary period that spanned 6 years into July 2004. The 2008 financial crisis damaged the financial well-being of the SAR's financial sector. The bankruptcy of Lehman Brothers affected the territory greatly. Joseph Yam, the Chief Executive of the Hong Kong Monetary Authority who was the highest paid central banker in the world resigned in 2009. Traditionally, HK dollar is pegged against the US dollar. Questions have come up on whether HK should peg to the Chinese yuan since it is integrated to China economically. But since the yuan is not fully convertible, a peg to the yuan would cause disruptions.

== Building and infrastructure ==
At the end of the 2000s, the International Commerce Centre (ICC), at 484 m (1,588 ft) high, was the tallest building in Hong Kong. The tallest building prior to the ICC was the Two International Finance Centre (2 IFC), at 415 m (1,362 ft) high, completed in 2003. Prior to that, the tallest building in Hong Kong was the Central Plaza since 1992, with a height of 374 m (1,227 ft).

Many new infrastructure projects had been completed throughout the territory during the 2000s. Examples of those infrastructures includes: For Railway - the completion of MTR Tseung Kwan O line in 2002, KCR West Rail in 2003, KCR Ma On Shan Rail in 2004, MTR Disneyland Resort line in 2005, the extension of the Airport Express to AsiaWorld–Expo in 2005, KCR Lok Ma Chau Spur Line in 2007, and MTR Kowloon Southern Link between East Rail line and West Rail line from Hung Hom station to Nam Cheong station via East Tsim Sha Tsui station and Austin station in 2009. For major bridges and tunnels - the completion of Discovery Bay Tunnel in 2000, Nam Wan Tunnel in 2007, Deep Bay Bridge (Hong Kong–Shenzhen Western Corridor) in 2007, Eagle's Nest Tunnel and Sha Tin Heights Tunnel in 2008, and Stonecutters Bridge in 2009.

Other major infrastructures includes the opening of the Hong Kong Disneyland in 2005, which was the fifth Disneyland opened in the world and the second opened in Asia after the Tokyo Disneyland, and the completion of the Ngong Ping 360 in 2006, which was a gondola lift system that connects Tung Chung New Town and Ngong Ping Market.

== Demographics ==
=== Population ===
In 2000, the population of Hong Kong was 6,900,000. The population in the summer of 2006 was 6,994,500, though the majority of population increase is mostly contributed via immigration from mainland citizens. Also in 2006, the birth rate of 7.29 is ranked lowest among the list of countries surveyed by the CIA. Towards the end of the decade, Hong Kong's population had slowed further to a growth of 0.5% in 2009 with the city having a total population of 7,055,071 as of 2009. Other new immigration topics include the Right of abode issue, Quality Migrant Admission Scheme or the Capital Investment Entrant Scheme.

== Culture ==
Anita Mui in her final concert

=== Entertainment ===
The passing of idol legends like Leslie Cheung and Anita Mui rocked the cantopop industry. Their deaths in the early 2000s further sank the people's morale. The 2008 Edison Chen photo scandal was also dubbed Asia's biggest scandal. Other cultural phenomenon include the rise of young female Liang mou models.

=== Charities ===
The HK government and entertainment industry pursued a number of major charities in the decade. The 1:99 Concert was held for the SARS outbreak. In early 2005, a major relief campaign concert was held for the victims of the neighbouring 2004 Indian Ocean Tsunami. This was followed by one of the largest assembly of celebrities in the territory in the Artistes 512 Fund Raising Campaign for the 2008 Sichuan earthquake. In 2009, the Artistes 512 Fund Raising Campaign was held for Typhoon Morakot in Taiwan.

== Sports ==
Hong Kong was the site for the 2008 Olympics and paralympics Equestrian events. The events were held at the Hong Kong Sports Institute in Fo Tan, Sha Tin. The torch relay also passed through both the Special administrative regions of HK and Macau. Various stars and celebrities were also present at the opening ceremonies in Beijing. At the end of 2009, HK also held its first ever East Asian Games. It opened up with a performance on the water of Victoria Harbour.

== Society ==
Beginning in 2008, the Mong Kok acid attacks began a series of acid throwing incidents from tall buildings. The government also stepped up effort against multiple incidents of throwing any random objects out of skyscraper windows and roofs. The housing department began installing closed-circuit television systems to monitor these throwing activities. Other incident involve the creation of a mass-suicide Facebook group called "I want to practise suicide" (我要（練習）自殺). The group was shut down before urging 190 members to kill themselves.

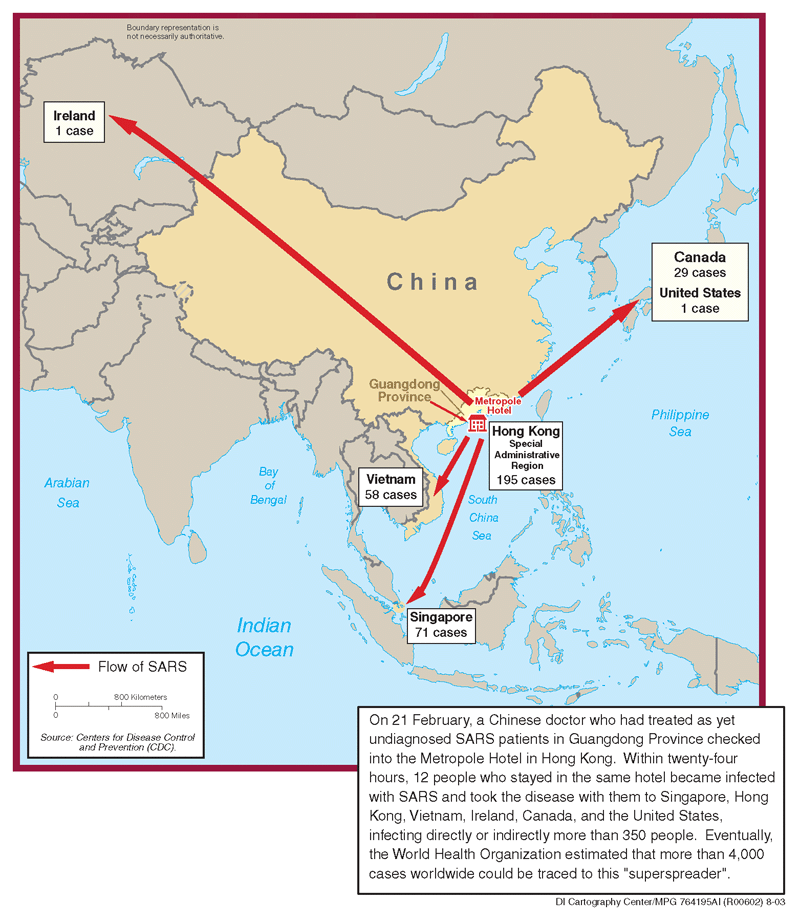
Spread of SARS

== Health ==
=== Flu pandemics ===
Health officials made the Bird Flu crisis a top priority beginning in 1997. To control the spread of the virus, millions of chickens were slaughtered in an extreme measure to prevent the global spread of the H5N1 virus. The crisis would lead to a series of panic that continue well into the 2000s. The volume consumption of poultry was significantly reduced for a period. Beginning in 1997, over 1 million birds were slaughtered, followed by 860,000 in 2002. Another batch of 300,000 and 200,000 chickens in 5 farms in Kam Tin New Territories were also included in the quarantine process.

China also had series of outbreaks, and the pandemic have left both regions strained in trade relationships. Controversies of the handling of the crisis has been criticised by radio programmes, TVs and newspapers. Both Hong Kong and China were the center of international attention during the early 2000s. Specifically, the Health, Welfare and Food Bureau were constantly bombarded with questions about the effectiveness in the decision to slaughter in large numbers. Wild dogs, rats and cats preying on bags of uncollected dead poultry also made the whole procedure a public relations disaster for the government. In 2009 a Swine flu pandemics followed, but citizens were more prepared this time.

=== SARS outbreak ===
The first suspected case of severe acute respiratory syndrome (SARS) was recorded in February, 2003. Hong Kong remained on the World Health Organization's list of affected areas until 23 June 2003. The city was gripped by fear of contagion and panic throughout the epidemic. Children stayed home, while schools were halted. Economic activities were greatly disrupted. Restaurants were empty, and tourism ground to a halt. The epidemic infected more than 1,700 people and claimed 299 lives. As director general of the World Health Organization, Margaret Chan faced some tough issues.

== International ==
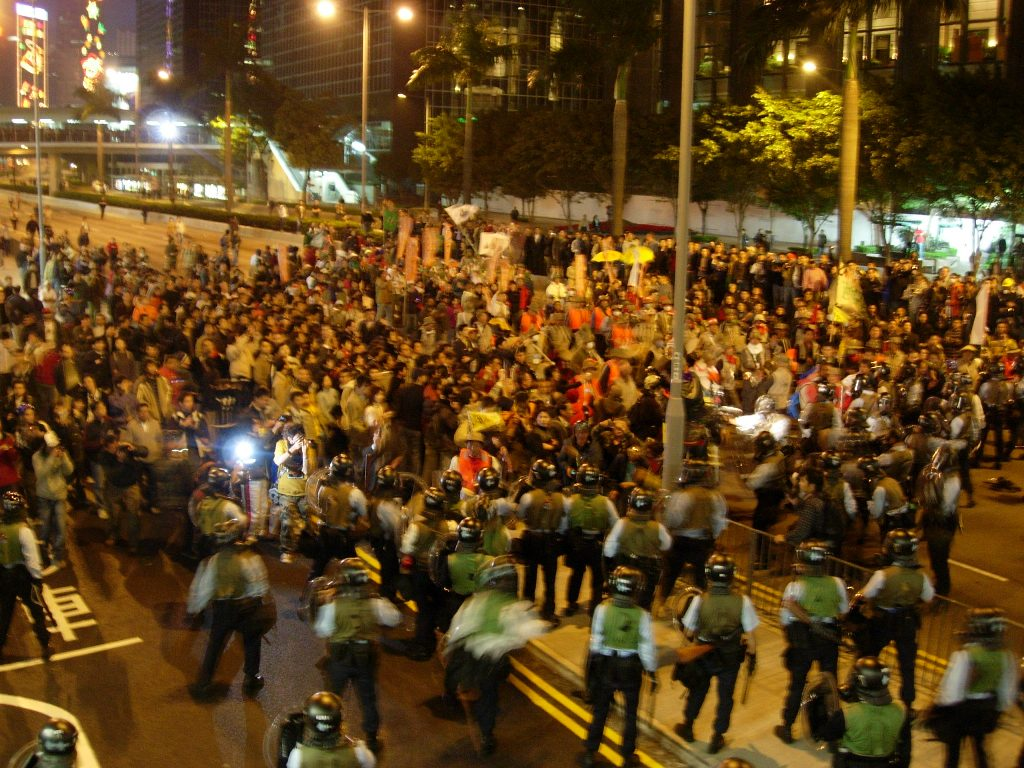
Protesters occupied Gloucester Road at the 2005 WTO conference

=== WTO ===
The World Trade Organization Conference of 2005 was held in Wan Chai. With 148 nations participating at the Hong Kong Convention and Exhibition Centre, it was one of the largest international event ever held in the area. A series of protests broke out in the designated protest zones and Hong Kong Police were resorted to using tear gas and pepper spray for crowd control. Multiple sources proclaimed the conference as the "Siege of Wan Chai" as the world class city became the hosting site of the event.
