= Visa policy of Hong Kong =

Policy on permits required to enter Hong Kong

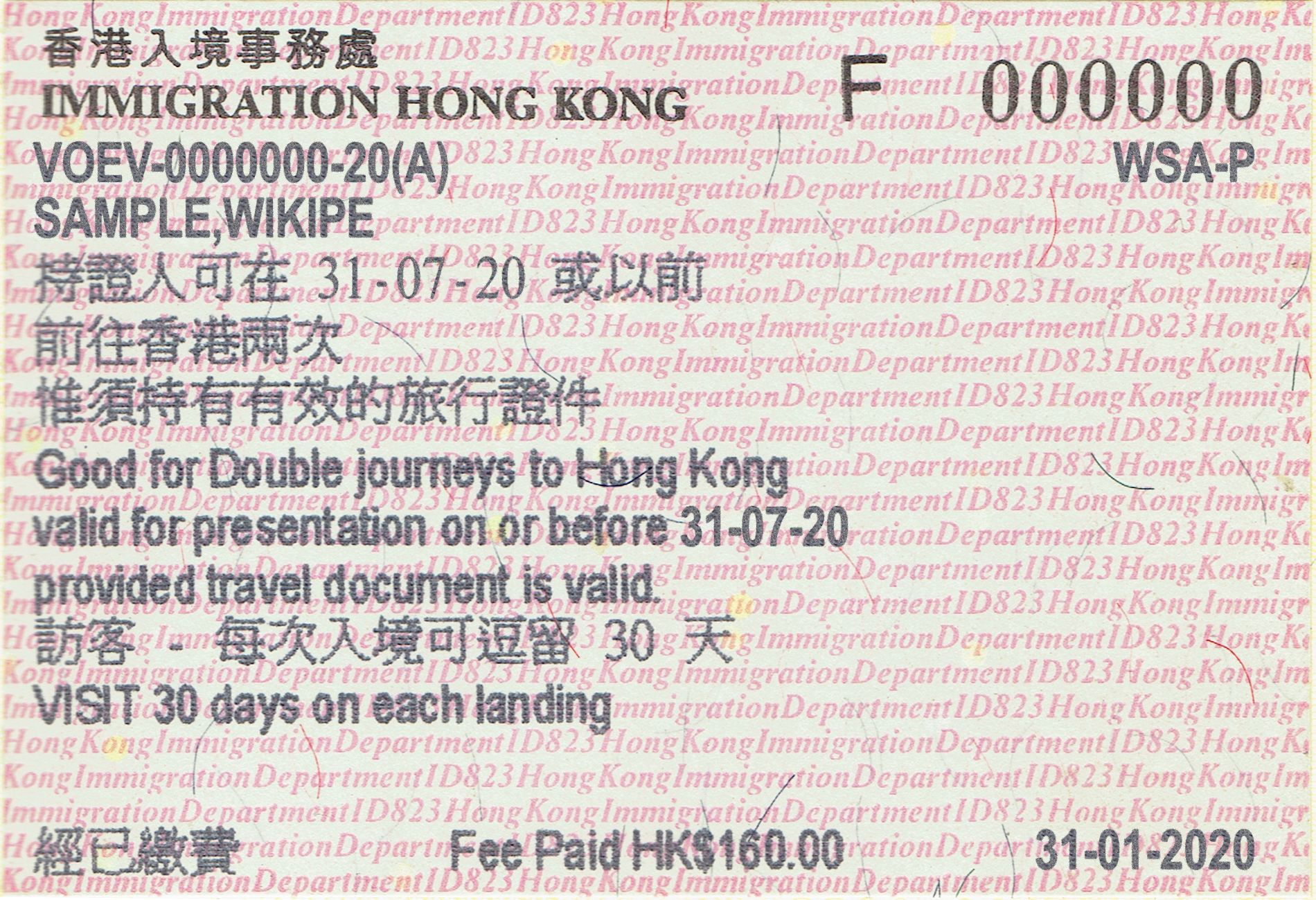
A Sample of Regular Hong Kong Visa for Visitor issued by Hong Kong Immigration Department

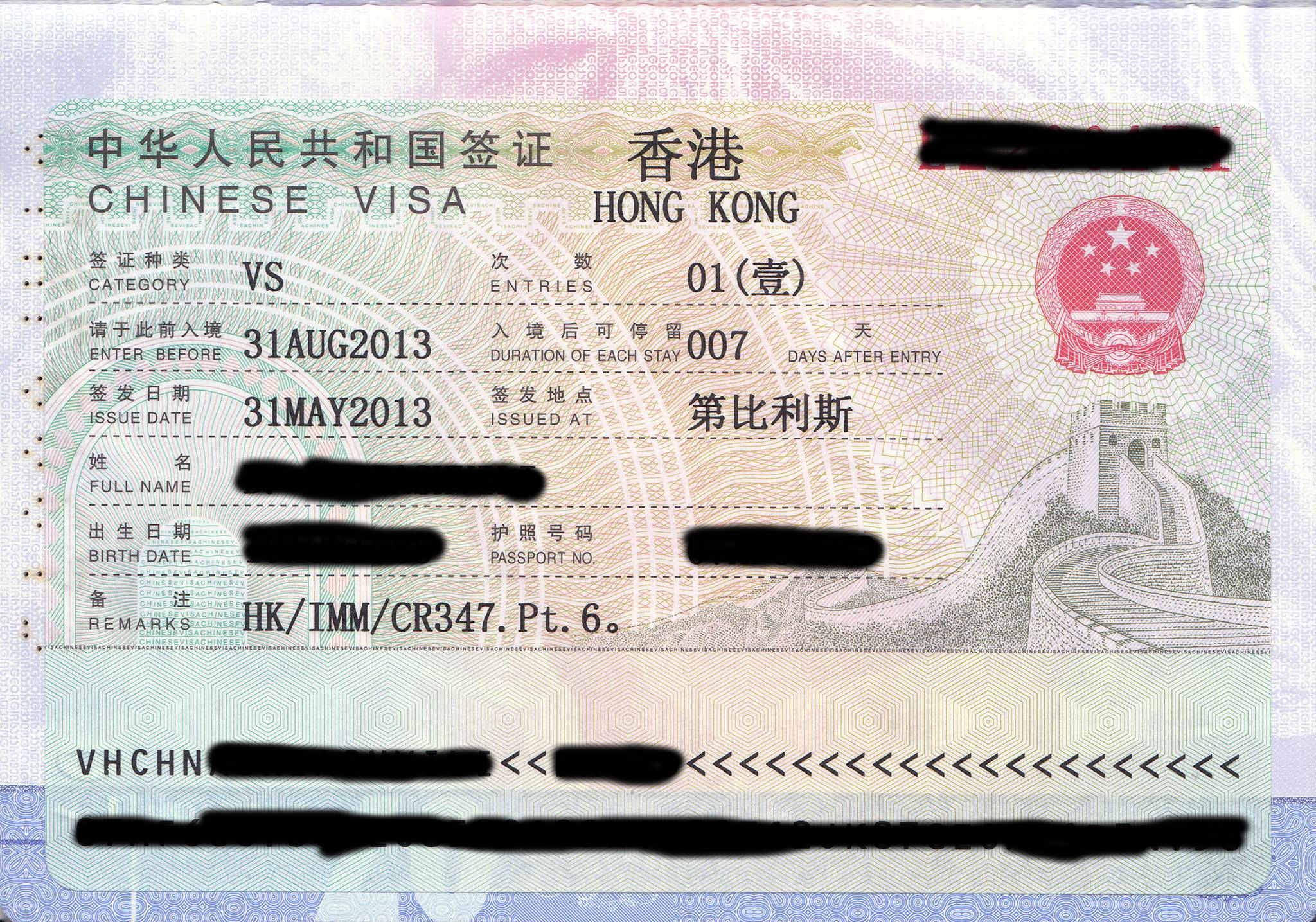
A visa for Hong Kong SAR issued by the Chinese embassy in Tbilisi

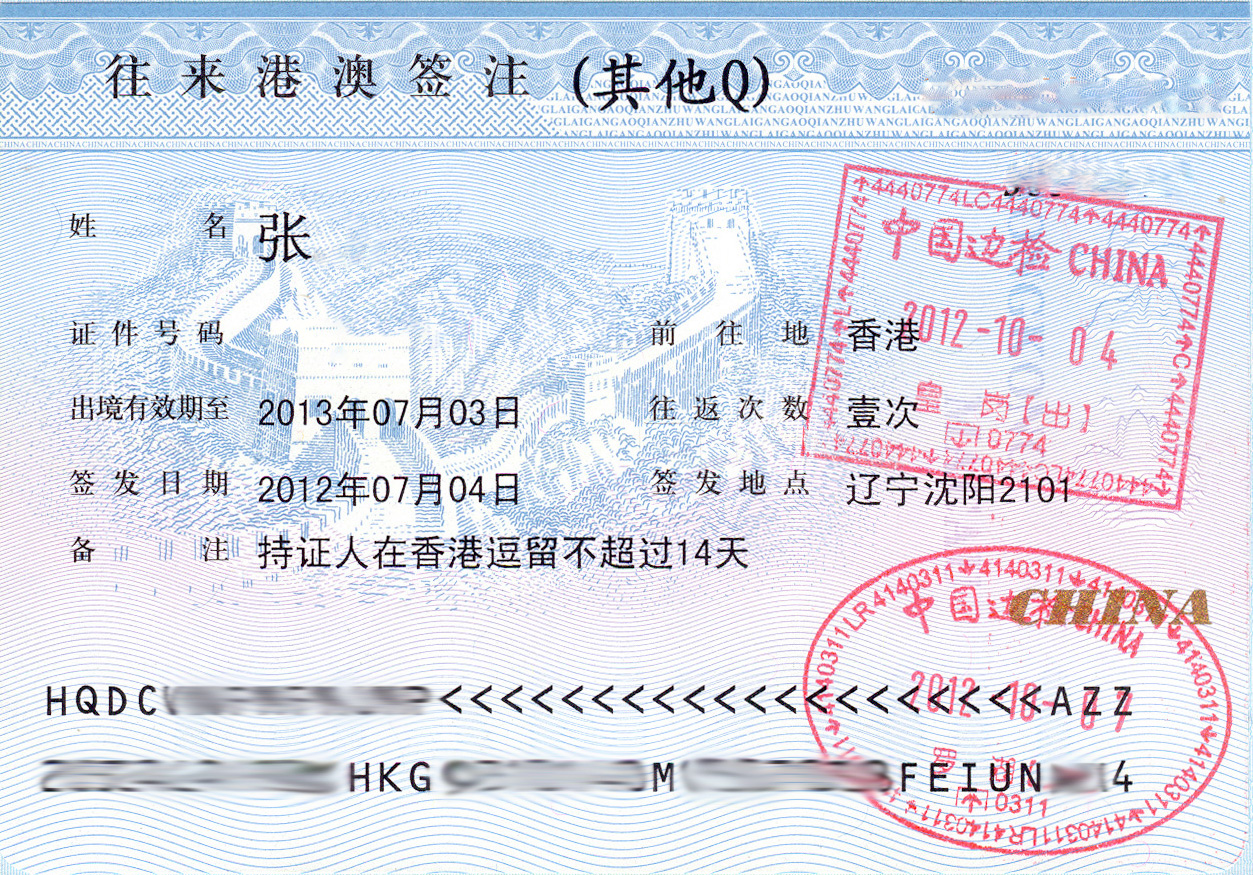
An entry endorsement issued to a Chinese national residing in mainland China on a Two-way Permit booklet

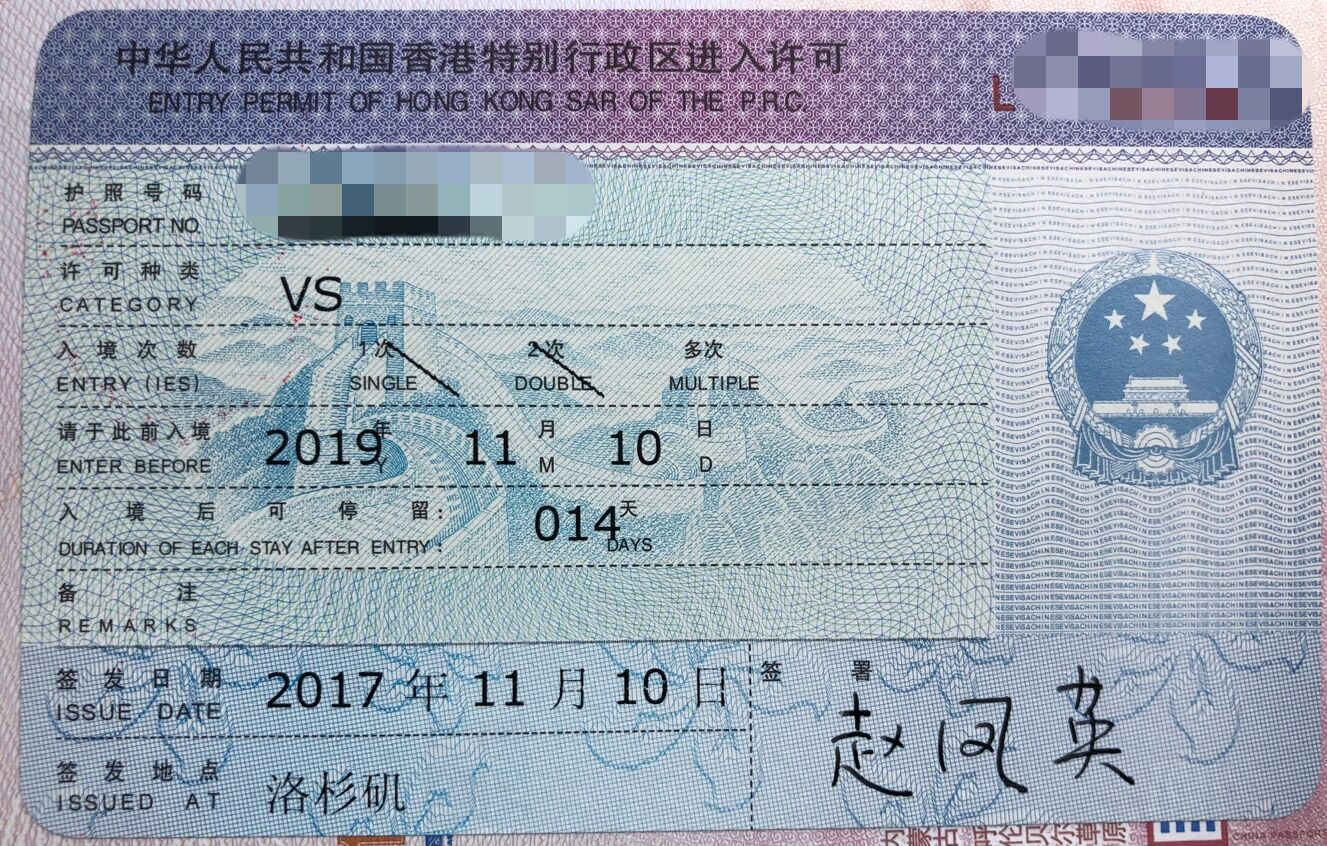
An entry permit for Hong Kong SAR issued to a Chinese national residing overseas

The visa policy of Hong Kong deals with the requirements in which a foreign national wishing to enter Hong Kong through one of the 13 immigration control points must meet to obtain an entry permit (permit to enter) or Visa, which depending on the traveller's nationality, may be required to travel to, enter, and remain in the Hong Kong Special Administrative Region. Visitors from over 170 countries are permitted without Visa entry for periods ranging from 7 to 180 days, to the Hong Kong Special Administrative Region for tourism or certain business-related activities. All visitors must hold a passport valid for at least 1 month.

Unless having the right to land or right of abode in Hong Kong, visitors to Hong Kong must obtain an e-Visa unless they are citizens of one of the visa-exempt countries, to undertake other activities, such as study, employment, or operation of a business. Under the one country, two systems policy, Hong Kong maintains its immigration and visa policy independently from the rest of China. Consequently, entering Hong Kong from mainland China or Macau requires passing through immigration checkpoints of mainland China or Macau. Whilst Macau residents have visa-free access to Hong Kong, Mainland residents must obtain a Two-way Permit (EEP) with the appropriate exit endorsement from the Chinese Ministry of Public Security before visiting Hong Kong. They can only use a PRC passport if either transiting to and from another country or territory, having a sticker-styled HKSAR Entry Permit issued by Chinese Missions on the passport or having an e-Hong Kong Entry Visa/Permit issued by Hong Kong Immigration Department.

Due to the historical background of Hong Kong, immigration status in Hong Kong is determined by a combination of both nationality and residence status. Therefore, even a Chinese national with the right of abode in Hong Kong has a slightly different status to a foreign national with the right of abode in Hong Kong as well (since the former can never lose the right of abode status while the latter can lose it if they do not enter Hong Kong for a period of 36 months). At the same time, a foreign national with the right of abode in Hong Kong has a preferential immigration status to a Chinese national without the right of abode in Hong Kong, as the former can remain in Hong Kong indefinitely, while the latter has to have his immigration status reassessed whenever his visa/permit expires.

== Visa policy map ==
Visa policy of Hong Kong Hong Kong May enter with Entry–Exit Permit for Hong Kong SAR or Macau SAR or passport - Varies Online pre-registration or May enter with Mainland Travel Permit for Taiwan Residents - 30 days Visa not required (180 days) Visa not required (90 days) Visa not required (30 days) Visa not required (14 days) Visa not required (7 days) Visa not required for transit; otherwise, eVisa eVisa (for entry and transit)

== Unrestricted stay ==
Persons with the "right of abode" or the "right to land" may enter Hong Kong without holding any visa and without having any condition of stay imposed upon them, and may not be subject to a removal order. In addition, no deportation order may be imposed on a person with the right of abode. No visa or entry permit is required for holders of the following travel document:

1. Hong Kong Permanent Identity Card
2. Hong Kong Identity Card with 'R' or 'U' code.
3. Hong Kong Special Administrative Region Passport
4. British National (Overseas) passport (Note: The United Kingdom, which issues BN(O) passports, no longer has authority to grant the right of abode in Hong Kong, which since 1997 is a territory of the People's Republic of China. However, in practice BN(O) is a status that was only ever granted to BDTCs "hav[ing] a connection" to British Hong Kong as defined in the Hong Kong (British Nationality) Order 1986, and as such all holders of BN(O) passports are persons who enjoyed the right of abode in Hong Kong before 1 July 1997, and under the Immigration Ordinance continue to enjoy the right of abode or right to land.) (Note: No longer recognized by the HKSAR government for immigration clearance and identification purposes only from 31 January 2021, which has no effect on the immigration status of BN(O) in Hong Kong.)
5. Hong Kong Certificate of Identity (all of which have expired by 30 June 2007)
6. Hong Kong Re-entry Permit (for entry from mainland China and Macao only)
7. Hong Kong Seaman's Identity Book
8. Hong Kong Document of Identity for Visa Purposes, provided that the document is valid or the holder's limit of stay in Hong Kong has not expired
9. Any travel document bearing an endorsement stating either Holder's eligibility for Hong Kong permanent identity card verified or The holder of this travel document has the right to land in Hong Kong. (Section 2AAA, Immigration Ordinance (cap. 115, Laws of Hong Kong))

== Visa exemption ==
=== Ordinary passports ===
Citizens of the following countries and territories as well as Macau permanent residents may enter Hong Kong without a visa for business or tourist purposes. For business visits, they can undertake a limited range of business-related activities, namely "concluding contracts or submitting tenders, examining or supervising the installation/packaging of goods or equipment, participating in exhibitions or trade fairs (except selling goods or supplying services direct to the general public, or constructing exhibition booths), settling compensation or other civil proceedings, participating in product orientation, and attending short-term seminars or other business meetings". They are prohibited from taking up employment or study in the territory, or from "establishing or joining in any business". The last provision means that non-residents may not commence operating a business while in Hong Kong, and thus will be refused permission for business registration by the Inland Revenue Department unless it can be proven that the business began operation while they were outside of Hong Kong. However, the Companies Registry permits non-residents to incorporate limited liability companies and to be appointed as corporate directors (though not as corporate secretaries).

180 days

- United Kingdom (Note: For British Citizens only.)
- Macau (Note: For permanent residents of Macau only, regardless of nationality.)

90 days

- All European Union member states

Andorra; Antigua and Barbuda; Argentina; Australia; Bahamas; Barbados; Belize; Botswana; Brazil; Brunei; Canada; Chile; Colombia; Dominica; Ecuador; Egypt; Fiji; Grenada; Guyana; Iceland	Israel; Jamaica; Japan; Kenya; Kiribati; Liechtenstein; Malawi; Malaysia; Maldives; Mauritius; Mexico; Monaco; Namibia; Nauru; New Zealand; Norway; Papua New Guinea; Saint Kitts and Nevis; Saint Lucia	Saint Vincent and the Grenadines; San Marino; Saudi Arabia; Seychelles; Singapore; South Korea; Switzerland; Tanzania; Tonga (Note: Not applicable to holders of Tongan National and Tongan Protected Person passports.); Trinidad and Tobago; Turkey; Tuvalu (Note: Not applicable if holder's nationality is stated is I-Tuvalu.); United Kingdom (Note: For British Overseas Territories Citizens, British Overseas Citizens, British Subjects and British Protected Persons: 90 days.); United States (Note: Not applicable to holders of American diplomatic passports.); Uruguay (Note: Not applicable to holders of passports issued under Decree 289/90.); Vanuatu; Venezuela; Zambia; Zimbabwe

30 days

Armenia; Bahrain; Belarus; Bolivia; Cape Verde; Costa Rica (Note: Not applicable to holders of Costa Rican provisional passports and Documento de Identidad y Viaje.); Dominican Republic; El Salvador; Georgia; Guatemala	Honduras; Indonesia; Jordan; Kuwait; Macau (Note: Non-Permanent Residents holding Visit Permit for Residents of Macao to HKSAR.); Morocco; Nicaragua; Oman; Panama; Paraguay	Peru (Note: Not applicable to holders of Peruvian special passports.); Qatar; Samoa; Solomon Islands; South Africa; Thailand; Tunisia; Uganda; United Arab Emirates

14 days

Albania (Note: Not applicable to holders of non-biometric passports.); Algeria; Benin; Bhutan; Bosnia and Herzegovina; Burkina Faso; Chad; Comoros; Djibouti; Equatorial Guinea; Gabon; Guinea	Haiti; India (Note: Pre-arrival Registration online (PAR) required for normal passport holders. Holders of diplomatic and official passports, UN laissez-passers, HKSAR Travel Passes, Hong Kong SAR visas as well as persons successfully registered for e-Channels and Indian nationals in transit who do not clear immigration are exempt.); Kazakhstan; Lesotho; Madagascar; Mali; Marshall Islands; Mauritania; Micronesia; Mongolia; Montenegro	Mozambique; Niger; North Macedonia; Palau; Philippines; Russia; São Tomé and Príncipe; Serbia (Note: Not applicable to holders of non-biometric passports and Serbian passports issued by the Serbian Coordination Directorate in Belgrade.); Suriname; Ukraine; Vatican City (Note: Not applicable to holders of Vatican service passports.)

7 days

- Timor-Leste

Unlimited access

- United Nations Laissez-Passer holders
- Holders of diplomatic or consular identity cards issued by Hong Kong SAR

Date of visa changes
- 29 January 1976: Thailand (length of stay extended on 2 July 1997)
- 18 June 1998: Mongolia
- 20 January 2000: Hungary
- 14 October 2000: Slovakia
- 18 November 2000: Czech Rupublic
- 1 January 2002: Romania
- 2 February 2002: Lithuania
- 14 July 2005: Bulgaria
- 22 October 2008: Brazil
- 1 July 2009: Russia
- 20 September 2010: Grenada (resumed)
- 3 November 2010: Ukraine
- 14 November 2011: Serbia
- 1 January 2012: Albania
- 20 April 2012: Montenegro
- 26 July 2012: Kazakhstan
- 13 February 2018: Belarus (length of stay extended on 10 April 2019)
- 10 February 2019: Panama
- 3 March 2019: Armenia
- 30 September 2024: Georgia
- 26 August 2026: Nicaragua (resumed), Solomon Islands (resumed)

Cancelled:

- 15 July 1997: Grenada (was resumed in 2010), Nicaragua (was resumed since 26 August 2026), Panama (was resumed since 2019), Senegal and Solomon Islands (was resumed since 26 August 2026)
- 28 October 1998: Angola (was resumed on 10 March 2003), Nepal, Nigeria, Sierra Leone
- 1 January 2002: Liberia
- 31 March 2003: Eritrea and Pakistan
- 21 February 2005: Angola, Burundi and Cameroon
- 11 July 2005: Côte d'Ivoire, Democratic Republic of Congo, Ethiopia and Somalia
- 20 August 2005: Sri Lanka
- 16 January 2006: Republic of Congo
- 25 September 2006: Togo
- 1 December 2006: Bangladesh
- 7 March 2007: Ghana
- 29 October 2012: Guinea-Bissau
- 18 July 2014: Central African Republic
- 29 September 2014: Yemen
- 12 February 2015: Gambia
- 29 April 2016: Rwanda
- 10 December 2020: United States (for diplomatic passport holders)
- 30 January 2024: Eswatini

=== Non-ordinary passports ===
Holders of diplomatic or official passports of the following countries may enter Hong Kong without a visa for up to 14 days:

- Angola
- Azerbaijan
- Bangladesh
- Burundi
- Cambodia
- Cameroon
- Congo
- Ethiopia
- Ghana
- Kyrgyzstan
- Laos
- Moldova
- Myanmar
- Nepal
- Pakistan
- Sri Lanka
- Tajikistan
- Togo
- Turkmenistan
- Uzbekistan
- Vietnam

== Electronic visa (e-Visa) ==
Citizens of other countries may obtain an e-Visa.

Citizens of the following countries and territories are required to possess a visa for any type of entry into Hong Kong (including as tourists), but are not required to have a visa to transit airside if they remain within the airport transit area:

- Azerbaijan^{1}
- Cambodia^{1}
- Cuba
- Kyrgyzstan^{1}
- Laos^{1}
- Lebanon
- Moldova^{1}
- Myanmar^{1}
- Nepal^{1}
- Palestine
- Senegal
- Tajikistan^{1}
- Turkmenistan^{1}
- United States^{2}
- Uzbekistan^{1}
- Vietnam^{1}

_{1 - Except for holders of diplomatic or official passports.}
_{2 - Diplomatic passports only.}

=== Transit visa required ===
Citizens of the following countries and territories are required to possess a visa for any type of entry into Hong Kong (including as tourists) and for transit airside (even if they remain within the airport transit area):

- Afghanistan
- Angola^{1}
- Bangladesh^{1}
- Burundi^{1}
- Cameroon^{1}
- Central African Republic
- Congo^{1}
- DR Congo
- Eritrea
- Eswatini
- Ethiopia^{1}
- Gambia
- Ghana^{1}
- Guinea-Bissau
- Iran
- Iraq
- Ivory Coast
- Liberia
- Libya
- Nigeria
- North Korea
- Pakistan^{1}
- Rwanda
- Sierra Leone
- Somalia
- South Sudan
- Sudan
- Sri Lanka^{1}
- Syria
- Togo^{1}
- Yemen

_{1 - Except for holders of diplomatic or official passports.}

== Mainland China, Macau, and Taiwan ==
Special rules are in force for nationals of China and Taiwan who do not reside in Hong Kong.

=== Overview ===
Nationality	Residency	Point of departure	Travel document	Duration of stay
People's Republic of China	Mainland China	Mainland China	Permit for Proceeding to Hong Kong and Macao (One-way Permit)	7 years
People's Republic of China	Mainland China	Mainland China	Chinese passport	7 days (for transit to and from another country or territory only)
People's Republic of China	Mainland China	Mainland China or overseas	Exit-Entry Permit for Travelling to and from Hong Kong and Macau (Two-way Permit) with a valid endorsement	Varies, at least 7 days
People's Republic of China	Mainland China	Overseas	Chinese passport	7 days (for transit to and from another country or territory only); 14 or 30 days for HKSAR Entry Permit holders Varies for holders of digital entry permit issued by the Immigration Department of Hong Kong
People's Republic of China	Macau	Anywhere	Macau Permanent Resident Identity Card	180 days
People's Republic of China	Macau	Anywhere	Visit Permit for Residents of Macao to HKSAR	180 days (for permanent residents); 30 days (for non-permanent residents)
People's Republic of China	Macau	Anywhere	Macao Special Administrative Region passport (for permanent residents); Macao Special Administrative Region Travel Permit (for non-permanent residents)	7 days (for transit to and from another country or territory only)
Republic of China	Taiwan	Taiwan or overseas	Mainland Travel Permit for Taiwan Residents (Taiwan Compatriot Permit)	30 days
Republic of China	Taiwan	Taiwan or overseas	Taiwan passport	30 days (with pre-arrival registration)
Republic of China	None (Nationals without household registration)	Anywhere	Chinese Travel Document	Varies (HKSAR Entry Permit required)

=== Mainland China ===
Chinese nationals with hukou in mainland China can obtain an entry permit from the Public Security Bureau for any type of visit to Hong Kong (Two-way Permit required for short visits and long visits), as well as an entry endorsement (similar to a visa) for the purpose of travel.

Chinese nationals holding Permit for Proceeding to Hong Kong and Macao can only enter Hong Kong through Luohu Port. After entering, they can no longer return to the mainland. They can apply for Hong Kong Document of Identity for Visa Purposes, which is valid for 7 years. After that, they may be eligible for permanent residency in Hong Kong and a HKSAR Passport.

Holders of Chinese passports are granted a stay of 7 days providing they are transiting to and from another country or territory .

Chinese nationals residing in a third country may apply for the HKSAR Entry Permit, affixed on their Chinese passports, from Chinese diplomatic missions. The duration of stay is usually 30 days for 1 or 2 entries valid for 3 months or 14 days for multiple entries valid for 2 years.

Chinese nationals residing overseas or having permanent residency in another country or territory residing in anywhere may apply for the digital entry permit issued by the Immigration Department of Hong Kong. The duration of stay varies and is usually 7 to 90 days.

=== Macau ===
Permanent residents of Macao can enter Hong Kong visa-free for a maximum period of 180 days solely with their Macao permanent identity card and Visit Permit for Residents of Macao SAR to Hong Kong SAR together with proof of Macao permanent resident status. Non-permanent residents of Macao can enter for up to 30 days if they hold a Visit Permit for Residents of Macao SAR to Hong Kong SAR.

Holders of MSAR passports or MSAR Travel Permits are granted a stay of 7 days providing they are transiting to another country or territory .

=== Republic of China (Taiwan) ===
Since 27 April 2009, ROC nationals with right of abode in Taiwan ("right of abode" is defined as the eligibility of obtaining a Taiwanese National ID Card) holding a Mainland Travel Permit for Taiwan Residents may enter Hong Kong for up to 30 days without obtaining an entry permit in advance.

Otherwise, a valid entry permit must be applied in advance. Previously only airlines and appointed travel agents are authorised to this application while a fee of HKD50 applies. Since 1 September 2012, ROC nationals with ROA in Taiwan may complete the application for Pre-arrival Registration (PAR) online, free of charge, if they fulfill the following criteria:

- were born in Taiwan or were born outside Taiwan but have been admitted to Hong Kong as a Taiwan resident before; and,
- are not in possession of any travel document issued by other countries or regions (except Mainland Travel Permit for Taiwan Residents, and Entry Permit issued by the Immigration Department of Hong Kong). Those who do are not allowed to use their Taiwan passports for entry and instead will have to visit Hong Kong on the strength of their other passports.

After the applicant has successfully registered for PAR, he or she will have to print out the "Notification Slip for Pre-arrival Registration for Taiwan Residents" and carry it when boarding the flight to Hong Kong. The applicant's Taiwan passport is then inspected, along with the notification slip, by an immigration officer. Each PAR is valid for two months from the day of registration and good for two trips to Hong Kong. The duration of each stay is 30 days.

ROC nationals without right of abode in Taiwan (commonly known as nationals without household registration) are not eligible for entry permits issued by the HKSAR government, nor are they allowed to enter with their ROC passport. Instead, they are required to obtain a passport-like Chinese Travel Document and a HKSAR Entry Permit issued by the Chinese diplomatic missions overseas.

ROC nationals who are in transit to a third country are exempt from obtaining an entry permit provided that they do not leave the airport transit area, regardless of whether they have right of abode in Taiwan.

== Admission restrictions ==
Entry and transit is refused to Kosovo passport holders, even if not leaving the aircraft and proceeding by the same flight.

Since 31 January 2021, British National (Overseas) passport are no longer recognised as a legal travel document to enter or exit Hong Kong by the Hong Kong SAR government. Thus holders of BN(O) passport who have the Right of Abode or Right to Land Status Holder will have to use other document such as Hong Kong identity card for Hong Kong immigration clearance.

=== Admission refused due to political conflicts ===
Since 2014, Hong Kong has refused some foreign politicians from entering the territory, especially those from United States, Japan and Taiwan.

Since 2021, the Commissioner of the Immigration Department can request airlines to refuse specific passengers from entering Hong Kong.

== APEC Business Travel Card ==
Holders of passports issued by the following countries who possess an APEC Business Travel Card (ABTC) containing the code "HKG" on the back of the card can enter visa-free for business trips for up to 90 days.

ABTCs are issued to nationals of:

- Australia
- Brunei
- Chile
- Indonesia
- Japan
- South Korea
- Malaysia
- Mexico
- New Zealand
- Papua New Guinea
- Peru
- Philippines
- Russia
- Singapore
- Thailand
- Vietnam

ABTCs are also issued to nationals of China and Taiwan, however Chinese nationals residing in mainland China are subject to entry restrictions and cannot use the card to enter Hong Kong. Taiwanese nationals are also ineligible and are required to travel with a Mainland Travel Permit or a passport with pre-arrival registration.

== Types of non-visitor visas ==
Persons without the right of abode or right to land in Hong Kong, regardless of their nationality, require visas if they wish to take up residence in the territory. Persons granted these visas become "non-permanent residents". Immigration Department policy places restrictions on the ability of nationals of Afghanistan, Cuba and North Korea to apply for most kinds of visas.

=== Employment, investment, and study visas ===
Hong Kong has a number of visas issued for the purpose of allowing the holder to take up employment or employment-related training:

- Employment as Professionals (EAP): subdivided into the Immigration Arrangement for Non-local Graduates (IANG, for non-local students who have received a degree in a Hong Kong tertiary institution), the General Employment Policy (GEP, for non-Chinese nationals as well as Chinese nationals who have resided outside mainland China for more than one year), and the Admission Scheme for Mainland Talents and Professionals (ASMTP, for Chinese nationals with household registration in mainland China). GEP and ASMTP entrants require permission from the Immigration Department to change employers; IANG entrants do not.
- Training: for periods of up to 12 months. Applications from Chinese nationals with household registration in mainland China are generally not entertained, unless the sponsoring company is multinational and well-established in Hong Kong.
- Working Holiday Scheme (WHS), allowing persons between the ages of 18 and 30 to come to Hong Kong for up to 12 months. There is an annual quota of visas, per nationality: Australia (5,000), Austria (100), Canada (200), France (750), Germany (300), Ireland (200), Japan (1,500), South Korea (1,000), New Zealand (400), and the United Kingdom (1,000); other nationalities are not eligible. Participants are required to adhere to the specific terms imposed on them based on their nationality.
- Employment as imported workers, also known as Supplementary Labour Scheme (SLS): for work at the "technician level or below". Change of employment not permitted. Employer must pay a HK$400/month levy for up to 24 months.
- Employment as domestic helpers: see foreign domestic helpers in Hong Kong.
- Descendants of Hong Kong residents who immigrated overseas, also known as Admission Scheme for the Second Generation of Chinese Hong Kong Permanent Residents (ASSG): for children of Hong Kong permanent residents of Chinese descent. Applicants must be born "overseas" (i.e., in a country other than China or Taiwan), are between 18 and 40 years old at the time of application, and have acceptable education backgrounds as well as language skills. Admitted persons do not have any restrictions of stay other than time limitations, and are allowed to take any jobs or start businesses. It is worth noting that certain people who fall into this category may already have right of abode or right to land in Hong Kong due to residual rules before 1997.

The immigration department also grants student visas for persons wishing to study in registered private (non-public, non-aided) primary and secondary schools, and for various types of study at the degree level (short courses, exchange programmes, and certificate or degree courses). Taiwanese and Chinese residents of mainland China and Macau (only for those who moved from mainland China and settled later than 14 January 1979) are only granted visas to study in tertiary-level courses, short-term studies or exchange programmes. Since the 2008/09 academic year, student visa holders in degree courses of more than a year's duration at tertiary institutions may take up short-term internships; other student visa holders are prohibited from taking up any employment at all.

Other types of visas include the Capital Investment Entrant Scheme (CIES) visa (suspended since 15 January 2015), the Quality Migrant Admission Scheme (QMAS) visa, and the investment visa.

Nationals of Afghanistan, Cuba and North Korea are not eligible for any of the visas listed above; nationals of Cambodia, Laos, Nepal and Vietnam are only eligible for CIES.

==== Top Talent Pass Scheme ====
In February 2023, the Secretary for Labour and Welfare, Chris Sun, revealed that the Top Talent Pass Scheme had approximately two thirds of all applicants come from mainland China. Most of the rest of the "overseas" applicants still hold a mainland Chinese passport; sources estimated that up to 95% of all applicants have a mainland Chinese passport. The program was announced in October 2022, with a "global drive". In April 2023, Director of Immigration Au Ka-wang confirmed that 95% of all applicants were mainland Chinese, with only 3% of applicants coming from Canada, Australia, the United States, and Singapore. In April 2023, Sun also commented that the program was popular among "foreign talent." SCMP reported that 95% of approvals were also given to mainland Chinese. On 30 June 2023, local media also confirmed that 95% of approvals were given to mainland Chinese; when asked about if the program was unattractive to foreigners, Sun said mainland Chinese "knew better about Hong Kong."

After He Jiankui, a formerly jailed mainland Chinese resident, was approved for the Top Talent Pass Scheme, Sun acknowledged that applicants do not need to declare their criminal history. Being asked by reporters about the case, Sun said that he would not make comments on individual cases, as this would "not [be] appropriate" for him. He Jiankui also said that despite being approved for the visa, he had no plans to move to Hong Kong. After the incident, the government said that future applicants must declare their past criminal records.

After multiple posts on mainland Chinese online platforms discussed using the visa to give birth to children in Hong Kong, which would give benefits such as right of abode and permanent residency to the children, government authorities warned that mainland Chinese women should not misuse the visa to give birth in Hong Kong.

In July 2023, Sun announced that the government would consider allowing graduates from mainland Chinese universities which were not ranked in the top 100 to apply for the program.

In September 2023, SCMP reported that out of five visas schemes to work in Hong Kong, more than 90% of those approved were from mainland China. Some industry experts, including the CEO of the Hong Kong General Chamber of Commerce, warned that more talent from outside of China was needed to maintain Hong Kong's international status, diversity, and creativity.

In October 2023, local media interviewed approved Top Talent Pass Scheme visa holders, with some saying they did not plan to move to Hong Kong, and instead would use the visa as a backup option. Other applicants have said that they would use the visa to travel to Hong Kong to eat and shop, rather than to work there.

=== Dependent visas ===
Persons on unconditional stay, as well as those granted visas for study, training, employment as professionals, investment, or under CIES or QMAS, may sponsor their spouse and dependent children under the age of 18 for entry into Hong Kong. Persons on unconditional stay may additionally sponsor elderly dependent parents who are over the age of 60. However, persons on unconditional stay cannot sponsor Chinese nationals with household registration in mainland China or Macau residents who immigrated to Macau through "channels other than the One-way Permit scheme" as dependents with few exceptions. Additionally, nationals of Afghanistan and North Korea are not eligible for dependent visas. Dependent visa holders whose sponsor (parent or spouse, as the case may be) holds a study visa require prior permission from the Immigration Department to take up employment; other dependent visa holders may work or switch jobs without prior approval.

Since 2018, Hong Kong Immigration Department grants dependent visas to same-sex couples registered abroad, as a result of a landmark ruling by the Court of Final Appeal.

== Visitor statistics ==
Most visitors arriving in Hong Kong were from the following countries of nationality:

Country/Territory	Total			
Country/Territory	2019	2018	2017	2016
Mainland China	43,774,685	51,038,230	44,445,259	42,778,145
Taiwan	1,538,915	1,925,234	2,010,755	2,011,428
Macau	1,238,780	1,094,924	1,001,057	994,999
United States	1,107,165	1,304,232	1,215,629	1,211,539
Japan	1,078,836	1,287,773	1,230,010	1,092,329
South Korea	1,042,540	1,421,411	1,487,670	1,392,367
Philippines	875,897	894,821	894,489	791,171
United Kingdom	518,378	572,739	555,353	551,930
Australia	505,523	580,167	567,881	575,812
Thailand	467,048	571,606	560,207	594,615
Singapore	453,182	610,508	627,612	674,006
Indonesia	375,781	427,007	482,022	464,406
Malaysia	392,562	510,601	516,701	535,542
India	337,997	386,681	392,853	480,906
Canada	318,479	377,992	370,335	369,363
Germany	217,779	226,819	225,183	226,594
France	177,768	201,850	204,130	213,641
Russia	138,679	161,916	148,098	142,664
New Zealand	92,422	109,655	106,757	96,819
Italy	89,783	92,671	104,933	105,317
Netherlands	85,227	93,863	94,826	95,762
Israel	69,269	77,010	74,943	64,403
Spain	60,646	66,518	62,775	63,964
South Africa	59,865	60,272	65,422	66,456
Switzerland	52,414	58,475	60,215	61,693
Brazil	48,500	49,097	50,047	48,657
Vietnam	44,406	56,807	55,652	59,443
Sweden	43,506	59,387	63,747	65,124
Mexico	34,919	39,929	39,545	37,758
Belgium	29,555	32,322	30,805	31,586
Portugal	27,510	26,153	27,391	28,171
Denmark	22,809	26,348	26,406	26,637
Austria	22,136	30,324	31,212	26,784
Finland	21,471	25,308	27,574	27,932
Turkey	19,386	23,845	27,388	28,703
Norway	18,303	22,935	21,777	22,095
United Arab Emirates	16,031	18,383	16,838	20,050
Argentina	13,081	15,989	18,349	16,615
Saudi Arabia	8,881	11,255	13,179	18,491
Jordan	8,693	10,422	11,208	10,703
Egypt	8,580	10,941	12,865	17,380
Venezuela	6,882	8,355	10,166	11,237
Kuwait	2,859	3,548	3,441	4,262
Honduras	1,208	1,404	1,373	1,318
Bahrain	1,132	1,324	1,433	1,918
Total	55,912,609	65,147,555	58,472,157	56,654,903

== See also ==
- Exit & Entry Permit (Republic of China)
- Visa requirements for Chinese citizens of Hong Kong
- Visa policy of Macau
- Visa policy of China
- Immigration Ordinance
