= Tai Tam Gap Correctional Institution =

Prison in Hong Kong

Coordinates: 22.2565°N 114.2315°E

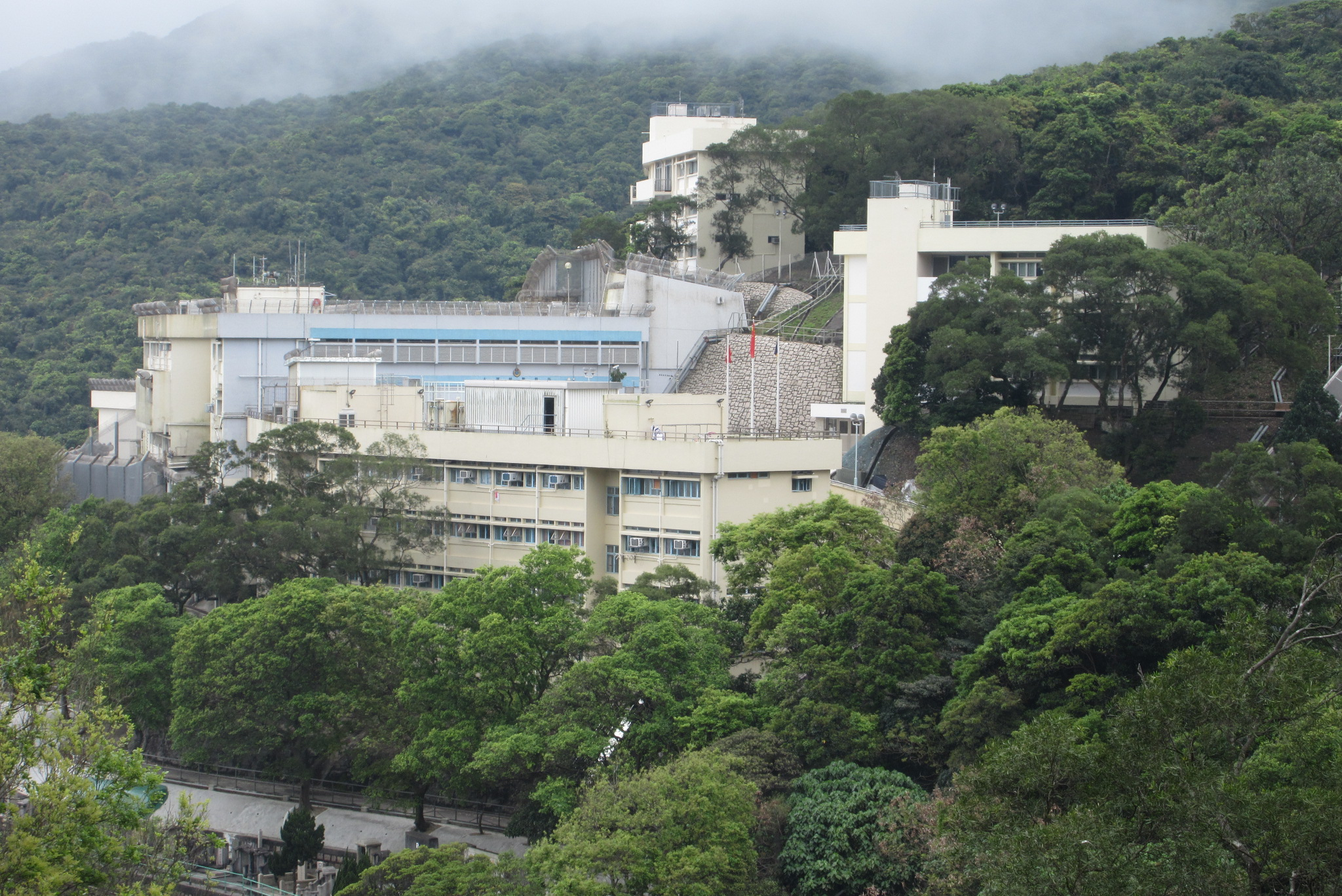
- Traditional Chinese: 大潭峽懲教所
- Simplified Chinese: 大潭峡惩教所
Transcriptions
Standard Mandarin
- Hanyu Pinyin: Dà Tán Xiá Chéngjiāosuǒ
Yue: Cantonese
- Jyutping: daai6 taam4 haap6 cing4 gaau3 so2

Tai Tam Gap Correctional Institution (Chinese: 大潭峽懲教所) is a prison in Eastern District, Hong Kong, operated by Hong Kong Correctional Services.

The Standard stated that it was in Shek O.

It opened on 1 May 1980. At the time, it was a prison for young girls and women. 14 was the minimum age. The prison then closed on 28 May 2008.

The prison was re-opened on 26 March 2014 and later closed on 6 June 2018.

In 2020, the prison service announced that it would make Tai Tam Gap the first "smart prison" in the territory.

On 28 May 2021, Tai Tam Gap Correctional Institution was re-commissioned as an immigration detention centre for male adult immigration detainees, in particular, the centre "is used for the detention of non-refoulement claimants".

The government stated that detainees held at TGCI pose 'security risks'. Unlike the other two immigration detention facilities in Hong Kong, TGCI is run by the prison authority, the Hong Kong Correctional Services, and not the Immigration Department.

As part of the 'smart prison' initiative, TGCI detainees are required to wear wristbands that collect biometric data, including heartrate, location, and movement data.

TGCI has a capacity of 160 detainees. On 28 February 2022, there were 111 detainees held at TGCI.

On 3 December 2021, Secretary for Security Chris Tang sharply criticized Stand News over its reporting on TGCI and other smart prisons. Stand News rejected the accusations.

== See also ==
- Immigration to Hong Kong
- Castle Peak Bay Immigration Centre
- Ma Tau Kok Road Government Offices
- Nei Kwu Correctional Institution
