= Top Talent Pass Scheme (Hong Kong) =

Immigration program in Hong Kong

The Top Talent Pass Scheme (TTPS, Chinese: 高端人才通行證計劃) is an immigration scheme launched in 2022 by the Hong Kong Government to attract high-income talents and graduates from the world’s top universities. The scheme is open to all industries, and applicants do not need to be employed upon their first entry into Hong Kong. By the end of 2024, there were over 116,000 applications, among which 92,000 were approved.

In the "World Talent Ranking 2025", Hong Kong rose from 9th in 2024 to 4th, ranking first in Asia. The Hong Kong government stated that this showed that Hong Kong's measures to attract talents were effective.

== Eligibility criteria ==
The application criteria include

1. Nationality: Not from Afghanistan, Cuba and North Korea.
2. Economic Capacity: Proof that during the stay in Hong Kong, they can support themselves and their dependents without needing public assistance.
3. Good Conduct: No known serious criminal record in accordance with immigration and security regulations.
4. Applicants can apply for TTPS visa under category A, B or C of the following table.

Top Talent Pass Application Categories and Requirements
| Applicant Category | Basic Education | Income Requirements | Work Experience | Application Quota |
|---|---|---|---|---|
| A | No requirement | HK$2.5 million in the year immediately preceding the application | No requirement | No quota restrictions |
| B | Hold a bachelor's degree from an eligible university | No requirement | At least three years of work experience accumulated within the five years immediately preceding the application | No quota restrictions |
| C | Hold a bachelor's degree from an eligible university | No requirement | Less than three years of work experience | Annual quota of 10,000, first-come, first-served |

== Eligible universities ==
An eligible university is defined as a university or institution that meets any one of the following criteria:

- A university or institution that has been ranked among the top 100 in any of the following rankings within the past five years: Times Higher Education World University Rankings, Quacquarelli Symonds (QS) World University Rankings, U.S. News and World Report’s Best Global Universities Rankings and Shanghai Jiao Tong University Academic Ranking of World Universities.
- A university/institution offering hotel programmes that has been ranked among the top five in the "Hospitality and Leisure Management" category of the QS World University Rankings within the past five years.
- A mainland Chinese university that has been ranked among the top 20 in the Shanghai Ranking of Chinese Universities within the past five years.
- The top five specialised institutions on the QS World University Rankings in the discipline of “Art and Design” in the past five years.

The Hong Kong Immigration Department maintains an aggregate list of eligible universities. Qualifications obtained from continuing and professional education colleges, branch campuses, extension colleges, or affiliated colleges of eligible universities are not accepted. The number of universities in the list has increased to 200.

== Term of stay and extertion ==
Individuals granted entry to Hong Kong under the Top Talent Pass Scheme are generally granted 36 months’ (Category A) / 24 months’ stay (Categories B and C). Subsequent extensions are only permitted upon securing employment or establishing or participating in a business in Hong Kong.

== History ==
Since the implementation of the Hong Kong National Security Law in 2020, Hong Kong has experienced an emigration wave. In his Policy Address 2022, Hong Kong Chief Executive John Lee Ka-chiu pointed out that the local labor force had lost about 140,000 people in the past two years. In addition to retaining local talent, the government will also take a number of measures to attract foreign talent and has decided to launch the "Top Talent Pass Scheme".

The Top Talent Pass was announced in the 2022 Policy Address and began accepting applications on December 28 of the same year.

On December 13, 2023, Hong Kong Secretary for Labour and Welfare, Sun Yuk-han, stated that as of the end of November 2023, the TTPS had received 60,497 applications in the first 11 months of this year, with 47,681 approved. According to government statistics, 95% of the approved applications came from mainland China.

By the end of 2024, 92,000 of the total of over 116,000 applications of the Top Telent Pass Scheme were approved. More than 75,000 of the applicants had arrived in Hong Kong with their families. More than half of them were under 40 years old.

As of July 31, 2025, the renewal rate of the TTPS was approximately 54%. Sun Yuk-han, Secretary for Labour and Welfare, stated that the median monthly salary of successfully renewed applicants was approximately HK$40,000.The TTPS talents contributed about $34 billion a year, or approximately 1.2% of Hong Kong's GDP. Nearly half of the talents had applied for visas of their spouses or children, bringing about 1.7 children to Hong Kong per applicant. About two-thirds of them resided in the city.

On September 9, 2025, the International Institute for Management Development (IMD) in Lausanne, Switzerland, published the "2025 World Talent Ranking," which showed that Hong Kong's ranking improved significantly, rising from 9th in 2024 to 4th, ranking first in Asia. The Hong Kong government stated that this shows that Hong Kong's measures to attract talent have been effective.

== Abuse ==
The original intention of the Top Talent Pass Scheme was to attract top talents, but since its launch at the end of 2022, cases of applicants submitting false documents and abusing the scheme continued to rise. Authorities discovered that a professional cross-border criminal syndicate was assisting ineligible individuals in applying for the TTPS using forged academic credentials and false income statements, involving at least 22 applications. The Hong Kong Immigration Department found that the syndicate had been operating for about a year and a half, providing a "one-stop" service, charging up to HK$2.5 million per application, with a total amount involved reaching HK$55 million. Some applicants also used the scheme as a stepping stone, aiming only to obtain the right of abode in Hong Kong so that their children could take the Hong Kong Diploma of Secondary Education Examination (DSE) and enroll in Hong Kong universities as "local students." These "exam-based immigration" and "education-based immigration" practices violated the original intent of the scheme.

== Controversy ==
=== He Jiankui's "Top Talent Pass" Approved ===
On February 21, 2023, Ming Pao reported that He Jiankui, who had a serious record of violating academic ethics, had his application for the Top Talent Pass Scheme approved. At 23:55 Hong Kong time that day, the Hong Kong SAR government responded that after reviewing the relevant applications, the Hong Kong Immigration Department suspected that someone had obtained a visa/entry permit by making false statements. The Director of Immigration has declared He Jiankui's visa/entry permit invalid in accordance with the law and will conduct a criminal investigation. At the same time, applicants who have not yet been approved are required to submit their criminal conviction records.

=== Controversy over Giving Birth in Hong Kong ===
After multiple posts on mainland Chinese online platforms discussed using the visa to give birth to children in Hong Kong, which would give benefits such as right of abode and permanent residency to the children, government authorities warned that mainland Chinese women should not misuse the visa to give birth in Hong Kong.

=== The applicants' origins are too singular ===
Lianhe Zaobao pointed out that as of February 28, 2023, the Hong Kong "Top Talent Pass Scheme" had received a total of 14,240 applications, of which 8,797 were approved. Among them, 8,325 people were from mainland China, accounting for nearly 95% of the total approved applicants.

In September 2023, SCMP reported that out of five visas schemes to work in Hong Kong, more than 90% of those approved were from mainland China. Patrick Yeung Wai-tim, the CEO of the Hong Kong General Chamber of Commerce, stated that talent from outside of China was needed to maintain Hong Kong's status as a global financial hub and drive future growth.

=== 60-year-old applicant approved ===
According to HK01, Hu Xingfa, 60 years old, graduated from the Department of Electrical Engineering, majoring in high voltage technology and equipment, of Huazhong Institute of Technology (the predecessor of Huazhong University of Science and Technology) in July 1985. After graduation, he has been working in the power industry. In order to reunite with his family, Hu Xingfa chose to work in Hong Kong. In March 2023, Hu Xingfa applied for Category B of the "High-Tech Passport Scheme". After submitting the application, he was approved in a few days. He obtained his Hong Kong resident identity card in June and went to Hong Kong with his wife in July to "re-employ" and reunite with his daughter. Considering the issue of visa renewal, Hu Xingfa has recently been studying financial knowledge and preparing to take the financial license exam. Presbyopia is the biggest obstacle for him to continue studying.

=== “Exam Immigration” Controversy ===
The dependents Children who came to Hong Kong under the Talent Scheme can take the Hong Kong Diploma of Secondary Education Examination (HKDSE) as self-study students and enjoy “local student” status to enroll in Hong Kong subsidized universities. In addition, there are also intermediary services that allow dependents to enjoy “local student” status. These phenomena have aroused controversy over “exam immigration” and are said to violate the original intention of the Talent Scheme. On August 12, 2025, the Education Bureau stated that dependent visa holders "must be under 18 years of age when first issued the relevant document by the Immigration Department and must reside in Hong Kong within two years immediately preceding the start of the course they are studying,"

In an article published in June 2026, it is stated that 93% of mainland Chinese top talents move to Hong Kong for children’s education, and 80 per cent of them prefer to move when their children are in upper secondary school.

== See also ==
- Immigration Department
- Quality Migrant Admission Scheme
- Birth tourism in Hong Kong
