= Immigration Ordinance =

Legislation of Hong Kong

Legislative Council of Hong Kong
- Long title: An Ordinance to consolidate and amend the law relating to immigration and deportation.
- Citation: Cap. 115
- Enacted by: Legislative Council of Hong Kong
- Commenced: 22 October 1971

Legislative history
- Introduced by: Attorney General Denys Roberts
- Introduced: 9 July 1971
- First reading: 21 July 1971
- Second reading: 13 October 1971
- Third reading: 13 October 1971
- Status: Current legislation

The Immigration Ordinance is Chapter 115 of Hong Kong's Ordinances. It regulates the immigration issues of Hong Kong, such as Right of Abode, immigration control and enforcement of illegal immigration by Immigration Department.

Introduced in 1971 (as Cap 55), it replaced a number of earlier ordinances that dealt with immigration control from China into Hong Kong:

- Passport Ordinance 1923
- Travellers' Restriction Ordinance 1915
- Registration of Persons Ordinance 1916 - amended 1935
- Immigration Control Ordinance 1940; 1949
- Deportation Ordinance 1917
- Immigration and Passport Ordinance 1934

The previous ordinances reflected the flow of immigration prior to establishment of the People's Republic of China in 1949 which resulted in a large movement of immigrants and illegal immigration from then onwards.

This ordinance is often cited in controversial policies and the restrictive nature of immigration in Hong Kong, especially in regards to right of abode to non-Chinese immigrants after amendments in 1988 to deal with post-handover Hong Kong.

== See also ==
- Hong Kong Identity Card
- Immigration Service Ordinance
- Visa policy of Hong Kong
- Immigration Act 1971 - passed in the United Kingdom at the same time as Hong Kong's ordinance and also dealt with right of abode
- Immigration and Refugee Protection Act (Canada)
- Immigration and Nationality Act of 1965
