= National identity cards in China (disambiguation) =

National identity cards in China may refer to the following identity documents:

- Resident Identity Card, for People's Republic of China
- National identification card (Taiwan)
- Hong Kong identity card
- Macau Resident Identity Card

== See also ==
- Identity document
- List of national identity card policies by country
