= Declaration Form for Holders of the Macau SAR Permanent Resident Identity Card to Hong Kong SAR =

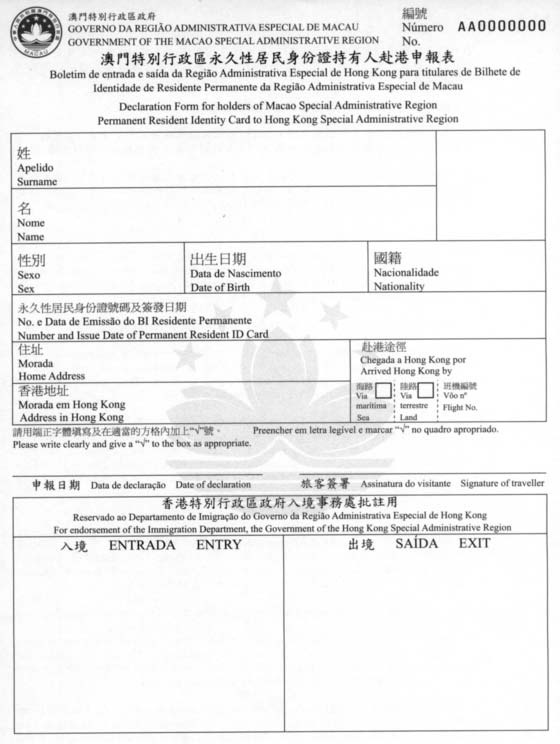
- Issued by: Macau
- Eligibility: Macau permanent residents
- Cost: Free

The Declaration Form for Holders of the Macau Special Administrative Region Permanent Resident Identity Card to Hong Kong Special Administrative Region (Portuguese: Boletim de entrada e saída da Região Administrativa Especial de Hong Kong para titulares de Bilhete de Identidade de Residente Permanente da Região Administrativa Especial de Macau) was a form available free of charge that must be completed by holders of a Macau Resident Identity Card (for permanent residents) who wish to enter the Hong Kong on a visit lasting no longer than 180 days for pleasure, business or transit. It is completed in place of the Arrivals Card filled in by other non-residents upon arrival in Hong Kong (which Macau residents entering on a Portuguese passport should complete instead).

This form can only be obtained on departure from Macau. Therefore, if travelers want to enter Hong Kong from a third country or Mainland China not passing through Macau, they must ensure that they have obtained enough copies of the Declaration Form prior to their departure from Macau.
