= Visit Permit for Residents of Macao to Hong Kong =

Macau travel document

Visit Permit for Residents of the Macao SAR to the Hong Kong SAR
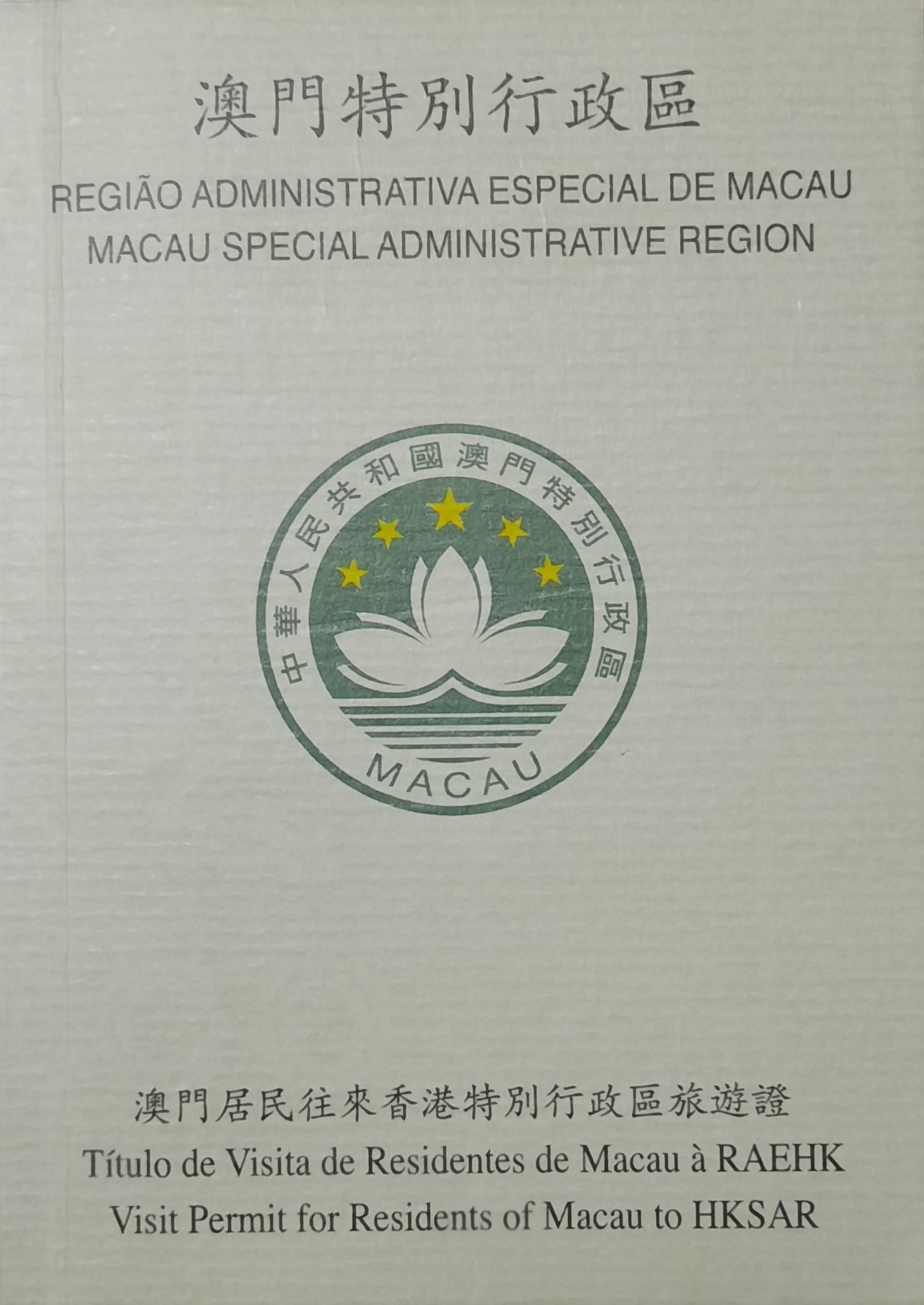
- The front cover of Visit Permit for Residents of Macao to HKSAR
- Type: Travel document
- Issued by: Macau
- Purpose: Travel document to Hong Kong only
- Expiration: 7 years after acquisition

The Visit Permit for Residents of the Macao SAR to the Hong Kong SAR (Traditional Chinese: 澳門居民往來香港特別行政區旅遊證; Portuguese: Título de Visita de Residentes de Macau à RAEHK) is a travel document used by eligible Macau residents to enter Hong Kong. It is valid for seven years, and allows the holder to make multiple visits to Hong Kong, each time for up to 180 days (for permanent residents of Macau) and up to thirty days (for non-permanent residents of Macau) for pleasure or business without the need to apply for visas or entry permits.

A Declaration Form for Holders of the Macau SAR Permanent Resident Identity Card to Hong Kong SAR is not needed if entering Hong Kong using this travel document.

== Eligibility ==
- A Chinese or Portuguese citizen
- Resident of Macau SAR
- Holder of Macau SAR Permanent Resident Identity Card or Macau SAR Non-Permanent Resident Identity Card
