= Immigration Service Ordinance =

Legislation of Hong Kong

Legislative Council of Hong Kong
- Long title: An Ordinance to provide for the establishment and maintenance of a service to be known as the Immigration Service, to vest certain powers in its members and to provide for matters connected with the purposes aforesaid.
- Citation: Cap. 331
- Enacted by: Legislative Council of Hong Kong

Legislative history
- Introduced by: Acting Chief Secretary Edmund Brinsley Teesdale
- Introduced: 23 June 1961
- First reading: 21 June 1961
- Second reading: 2 August 1961
- Third reading: 2 August 1961
- Status: Current legislation

The Immigration Service Ordinance is Chapter 331 of Hong Kong's Ordinances. It was introduced in 1961 as Cap 30 to create the Immigration Department (Hong Kong) which was previously under the control of Hong Kong Police Force since the 1940s.

The Ordinance also resulted in the transfer of Registration of Persons Ordinance 1949 and role of Commissioner of Registration from the Hong Kong Police to Immigration Department.

== See also ==
- Hong Kong Identity Card
- Immigration Department (Hong Kong)
- Right of abode in Hong Kong
- Visa policy of Hong Kong
- Immigration Act 1971 - past at the same time as Hong Kong's ordinance and also dealt with right of abode
