= Castle Peak Bay Immigration Centre =

Building in Tuen Mun, Hong Kong

Coordinates: 22°22′36″N 113°59′11″E

- Traditional Chinese: 青山灣入境事務中心
- Simplified Chinese: 青山湾入境事务中心
Transcriptions
Standard Mandarin
- Hanyu Pinyin: Qīngshān Wān Rùjìng Shìwù Zhōngxīn
Yue: Cantonese
- Jyutping: cing1 saan1 waan1 jap6 ging2 si6 mou6 zung1 sam1

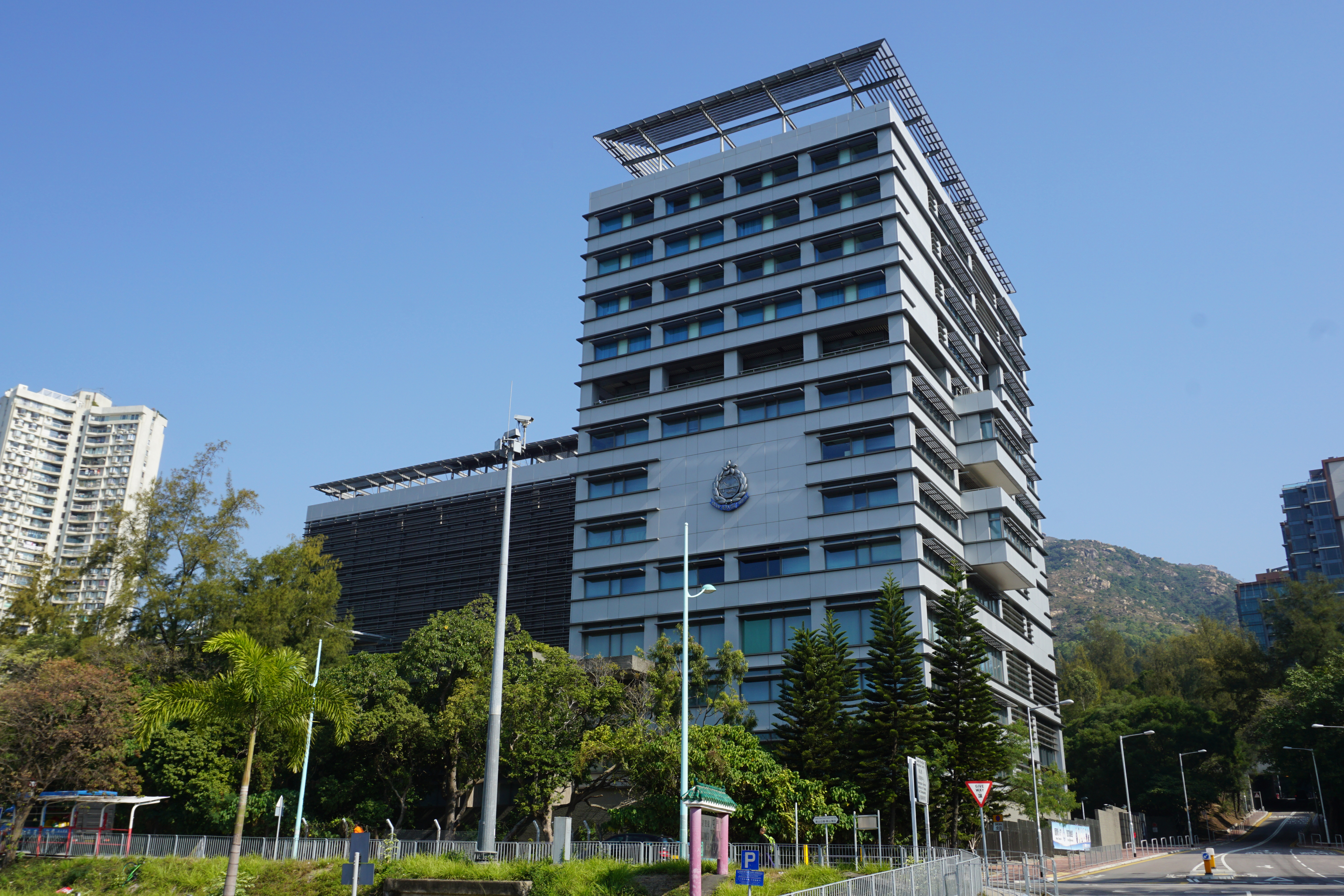
Immigration Centre and Immigration Service Institute of Training and Development in Castle Peak Bay, Tuen Mun

Castle Peak Bay Immigration Centre (CIC, Chinese: 青山灣入境事務中心 is an immigration detention centre located in Tuen Mun, Hong Kong. 7,942 persons were held at CIC in 2015 who were slated for expulsion from Hong Kong.

== Notable events ==
In December 2019, an Indonesian migrant worker, author, and reporter Yuli Riswati, reported that she was strip-searched by a male doctor at CIC. She noted that "Many friends who are still detained there at CIC are suffering – the conditions are inhumane and unjust."

From 29 June 2020, a group of around 25 detainees reportedly went on hunger strike against what they saw as their indefinite detention, though authorities said that, while they were refusing official meals, tests including for glucose levels showed that they were in fact taking nutrition of some kind.
