= Immigration Department =

Hong Kong government department

Agency overview
- Formed: 4 August 1961; 65 years ago
- Jurisdiction: Hong Kong
- Headquarters: 61 Po Yap Road, Tseung Kwan O, New Territories, Hong Kong
- Employees: 6,569
- Minister responsible: Chris Tang, Secretary for Security
- Agency executive: Benson Kwok, Director
- Website: immd.gov.hk

Chinese name
- Traditional Chinese: 入境事務處
- Simplified Chinese: 入境事务处
Transcriptions
Standard Mandarin
- Hanyu Pinyin: Rùjìng Shìwù Chù
Yue: Cantonese
- Yale Romanization: Yahp gíng sih mouh chyu
- Jyutping: Jap^{6} ging^{2} si^{6} mou^{6} cyu^{3}

Pre-handover Name
- Traditional Chinese: 人民入境事務處
- Simplified Chinese: 人民入境事务处
Transcriptions
Standard Mandarin
- Hanyu Pinyin: Rénmín Rùjìng Shìwù Chù
Yue: Cantonese
- Yale Romanization: Yàhn màhn yahp gíng sih mouh chyu
- Jyutping: Jan^{4} man^{4} jap^{6} ging^{2} si^{6} mou^{6} cyu^{3}

The Immigration Department is a disciplined service under the Government of Hong Kong, responsible for border and immigration control in Hong Kong.

After the handover of Hong Kong to China in July 1997, Hong Kong's immigration system remained largely unchanged from its British predecessor model. Residents from mainland China do not have the right of abode in Hong Kong, nor can they enter the territory freely, both before and after 1997. There are different regulations that apply to residents of Macau, another Special Administrative Region of China. In addition, visa-free entry acceptance regulations into Hong Kong for passport holders of some 170 countries have remained unchanged since the 1997 handover to China.

In a special arrangement, although Hong Kong's residents of Chinese descent are defined as citizens of the People's Republic of China, as stipulated by the Basic Law, Hong Kong's Immigration Department is responsible for issuing Hong Kong SAR passports for Hong Kong residents who are also PRC citizens seeking international travel.

== History ==
Flag of Immigration Department, 1988–1997

Badge of Immigration Department, 1988–1997

Prior to the 1950s, immigration to Hong Kong was not controlled by the government of Hong Kong and migrants freely entered Hong Kong. By the end of World War II, the influx of migrants from China to Hong Kong to flee Communist rule resulted in immigration control.

From 1949 to 1961, registration of persons with identification was required under the Registration of Persons Ordinance 1949 and established a Commissioner of Registration.

Until the establishment of Immigration Department on 4 August 1961, immigration control in Hong Kong was handled by the Hong Kong Police Force. The Immigration Service Ordinance 1961 created the new department in charge of immigration control. Later in 1977, the department enlarged its functions to cover registration of persons by amalgamating with the Registration of Persons Office and Director of Immigration also assumed as Commissioner of Registration. In 1979, the department took over from the Registrar General civil registration duties and the Director of Immigration was appointed as Registrar of Births and Deaths, and Registrar of Marriages.

In the 1970s and 80s, Hong Kong received up to 200,000 Vietnamese refugees with impacts on the economy, security, society, and searched for solutions. In the early 1987, one of the accommodated refugee boats received the assistance of the Immigration Department to depart to continue sailing. It arrived in Kinmen to apply for the asylum, but was rejected by the ROC military, then was slaughtered on the Lieyu Island on 7 March. The boat was burnt with evidence destroyed, and the Hong Kong government-issued documents were hidden to cover up, later the ROC Ministry of National Defense repeatedly denied on the journalists' reportages and the parliament questioning, until being exposed by the publication of General Hau Pei-tsun's diary in 2000, known as the Lieyu Massacre.

Prior to the handover of Hong Kong in 1997, the Immigration Department was responsible for processing BN(O) passport applications, which is now handled by the Government of the United Kingdom. In 2019, the department stopped allowing people to search birth or marital records without the consent of those being searched.

The department was headquartered in the Immigration Tower in Wan Chai North and was later moved to Tseung Kwan O.

== Roles ==
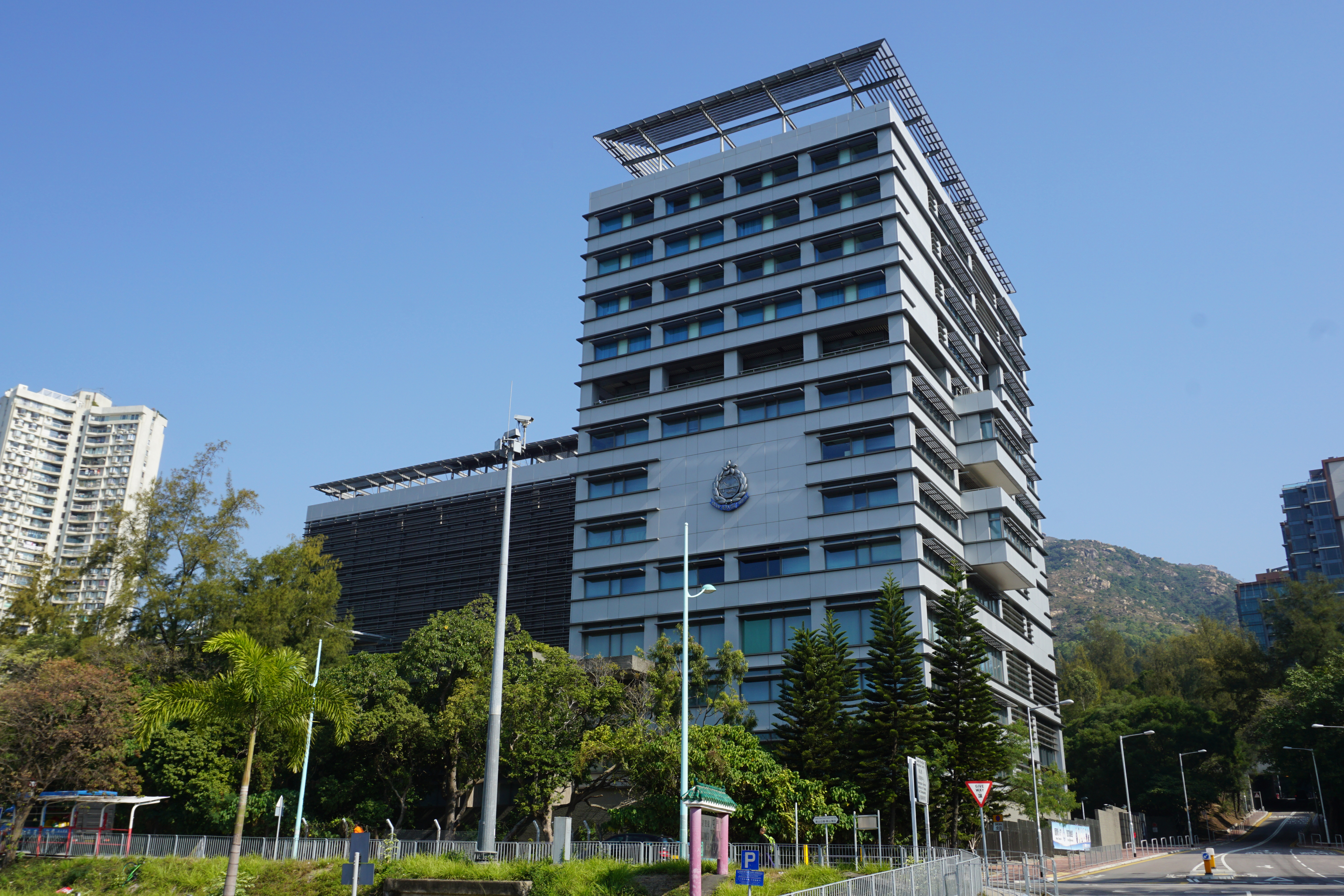
Castle Peak Bay Immigration Centre and Immigration Service Institute of Training and Development in Castle Peak Bay, Tuen Mun

The department performs the following roles:

- Immigration control at the checkpoints (Hong Kong International Airport as well as Mainland-Hong Kong port of entry)
- HK Resident Affairs (by Division of Registration of Persons)
  - Issuing Hong Kong identity card (both permanent and non-permanent)
  - Birth registration
  - Death certification
  - Marriage certification
- Registering/Denouncing Chinese citizenship
- Naturalization of HK permanent residents who wish to be Chinese citizens
- Issuing Hong Kong Special Administrative Region passport to permanent residents who are Chinese citizens
- Issuing Hong Kong Document of Identity for Visa Purposes for HK residents who can obtain neither a national passport nor Hong Kong passport.

== Directors ==
The incumbent Director of Immigration is Benson Kwok, who took office in September 2023.

== Ranks ==
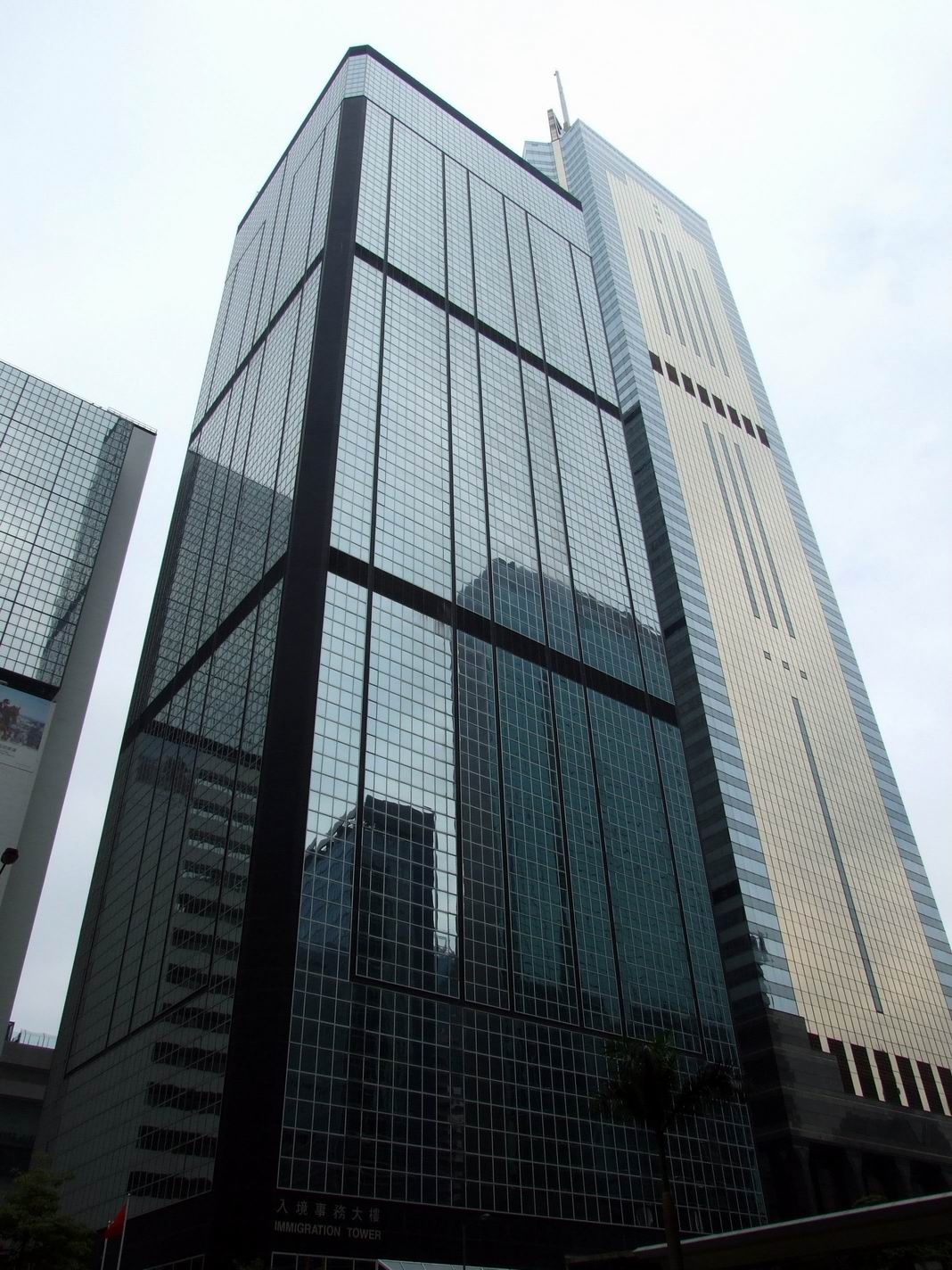
Immigration Tower

As with all of the HK Disciplined Services, British-pattern ranks and insignia continue to be utilised, the only change being the exchange of the St. Edward's Crown for the Bauhinia Flower crest post-1997. The ranks and insignia are listed below with their UK equivalences:

Rank	UK Equivalent	Insignia
Director of Immigration (入境事務處處長)	General	
Deputy Director of Immigration (入境事務處副處長）	Lieutenant-General	
Assistant Director of Immigration (入境事務處助理處長)	Major-General	
Senior Principal Immigration Officer (高級首席入境事務主任）	Colonel	
Principal Immigration Officer (首席入境事務主任）	Lieutenant-Colonel	
Assistant Principal Immigration Officer (助理首席入境事務主任）	Major	
Chief Immigration Officer (總入境事務主任）	Captain	
Senior Immigration Officer (高級入境事務主任）	Lieutenant with a silver bar beneath	
Immigration Officer (入境事務主任）	Lieutenant	
Immigration Officer (Probationary) (入境事務主任 [見習]) (with effect from 19 April 2010)	Second Lieutenant	
Chief Immigration Assistant (總入境事務助理員）	Three silver bars	
Senior Immigration Assistant (高級入境事務助理員）	Two silver bars	
Immigration Assistant (入境事務助理員）	One silver bar	

== Visas ==
In February 2024, the Immigration Department announced that all visa applicants would be subject to a national security risk test.

=== Approvals ===
In March 2026, Andrew Tate and Tristan Tate, brothers who were accused of crimes in Romania and the UK, were seen partying in Hong Kong, with one person commenting that Hong Kong "really is a haven for fugitives."

=== Delays and denials ===
==== Taiwan ====
In 2005, Ma Ying-jeou was denied a visa by the Immigration Department, despite being born in Hong Kong.

In July 2020, TECO's highest officer in Hong Kong, Kao Ming-tsun, was not granted a renewal of his work visa by the Hong Kong government because he refused to sign a statement supporting the "One China" principle. The Mainland Affairs Council of Taiwan mentioned that other government representatives in TECO had experienced major visa delays from the Hong Kong government as well.

==== Journalists ====
Since 2018, visas for some journalists have been declined by the Immigration Department, including New York Times journalist Chris Buckley and Hong Kong Free Press' incoming editor. In March 2021, the Ombudsman of Hong Kong announced that the Immigration Department was placed under investigation due to the rejection of the visa for the Hong Kong Free Press' incoming editor.

In November 2021, a journalist from The Economist was not granted a renewed visa.

In June 2023, Yoshiaki Ogawa was denied entry upon landing into Hong Kong.

In April 2024, a person from Reporters Without Borders (RSF) was searched multiple times at the airport before being denied entry into Hong Kong.

In August 2024, journalist Haze Fan was denied a visa to work in Hong Kong.

==== Others ====
In February 2020, Elizabeth Ward, Australia's new Consul-General to Hong Kong and Macau, was unable to take up her post due to visa delays, which was attributed to political tensions between Australia and China. In October, she was officially appointed.

In September 2021, the South China Morning Post reported that the department denied visas to dozens of Cathay Pacific pilots.

In November 2022, the department withheld the visa of Tim Owen, the lawyer of choice for Jimmy Lai. In December 2022, the visa was rejected.

In December 2022, freelance photographer Michiko Kiseki was not allowed into the city, after hosting an exhibition of photos from the 2019-20 Hong Kong protests.

In August 2023 and earlier in January 2020, photographer Matthew Connors was denied entry after landing in Hong Kong.

In October 2023, professor He Xiao-qing, who studies the Tiananmen square massacre, was denied an extension of her visa.

In January 2024, Hong Kong removed citizens of Eswatini from visa-free access into Hong Kong, and when asked if it was because of Eswatini's official ties to Taiwan, the Hong Kong government said "The Immigration Department reviews its visa policy from time to time and makes adjustments as necessary to uphold immigration control while facilitating travel convenience for genuine visitors."

In April 2025, British Liberal Democrat politician and MP Wera Hobhouse alleged to have been refused entry to Hong Kong without explanation, having arrived at Chek Lap Kok airport for a personal visit to see her son and newborn grandson and undergoing interrogation and deportation. Hong Kong authorities later issued a statement noting that "It is the duty of immigration officer to ask questions to ascertain that there is no doubt about the purpose of any visit. The person concerned knows best what he or she has done. It will be unhelpful to the person's case if the person refuses to answer questions put to him or her for that purpose." Some British parliamentarians expressed concerns that Hobhouse may have been deported on the basis of her status as a Westminster MP, with the-then Secretary of State for Foreign, Commonwealth, and Development Affairs David Lammy MP committing to "urgently raise this with the authorities in Hong Kong and Beijing to demand an explanation."

==== List of notable activists refused entry to Hong Kong ====
The department is also tasked with preventing visits by prominent foreign human rights and democracy advocates, upon the direction of either the city or the mainland government.

Name	Time
Yang Jianli	2008; 2009; 2011; 2014
Wang Dan	January 2011
Chen Wei-ting	June 2014
Benedict Rogers	October 2017
Chang Tieh-chih	December 2017
Victor Mallet	November 2018
Freddy Lim	December 2018
Albert del Rosario	June 2019
Feng Congde	June 2019
Dan Garrett See also: Congressional-Executive Commission on China	September 2019
Kenneth Roth	January 2020

== See also ==
- Visa policy of Hong Kong
- Hong Kong Police Force
- Marine Region
- Immigration Ordinance
- Boundaries of Hong Kong

== Order of precedence ==
Preceded by Hong Kong Police Force	Immigration Department (Hong Kong) since 1961	Succeeded by
