= Macau Resident Identity Card =

Identity card of Macau

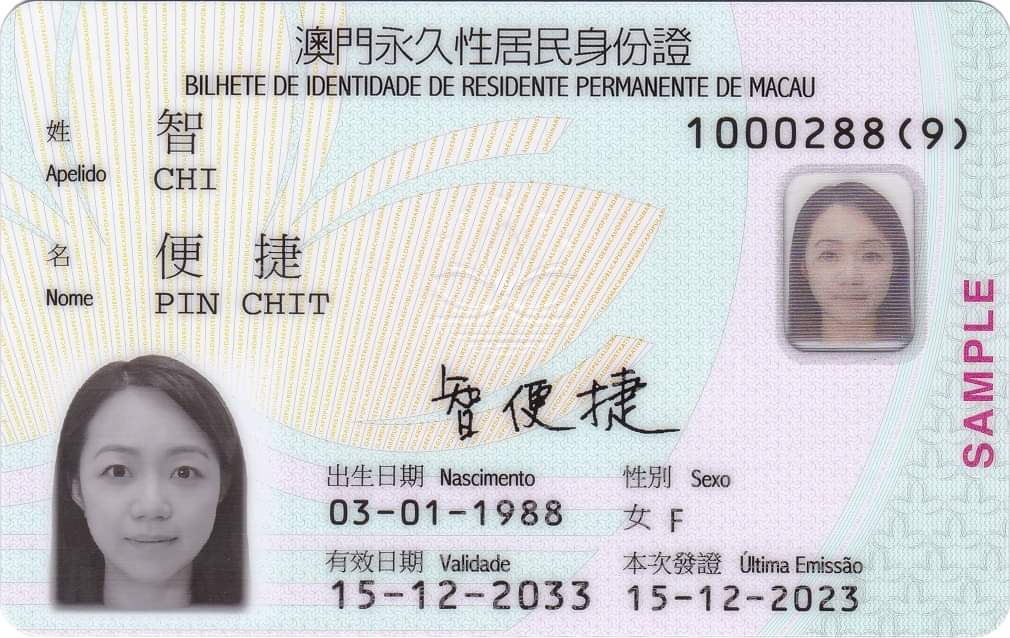
- The front of the third-generation (2023) Macau Permanent Resident Identity Card

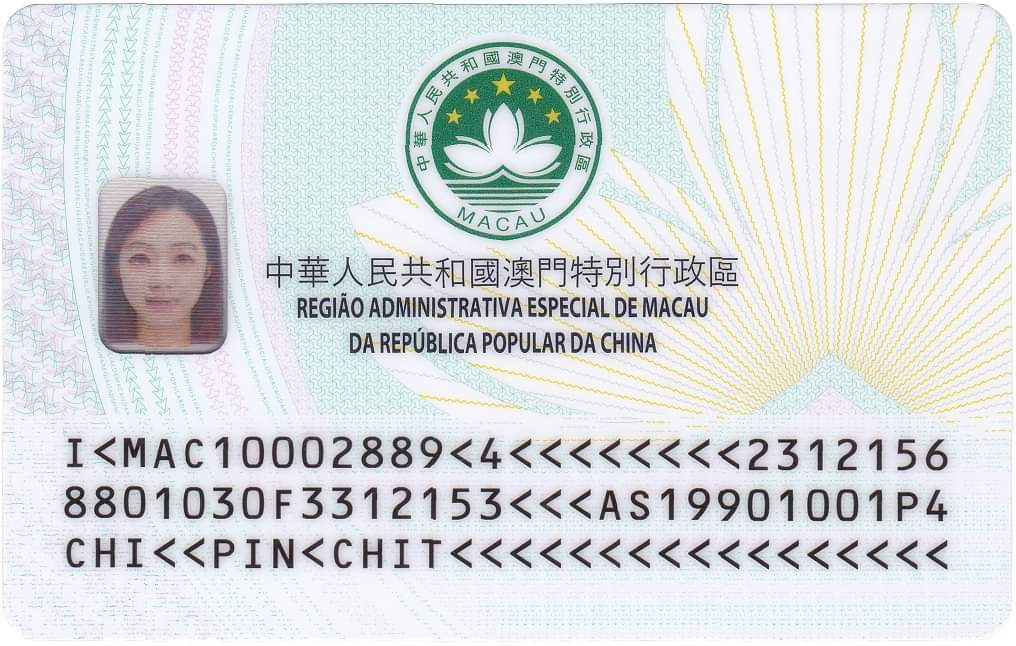
- The reverse of the third-generation (2023) Macau Permanent Resident Identity Card (with the right of abode in Macau)
- Type: Identity card
- Issued by: Macau
- Purpose: Identification
- Valid in: Macau; Hong Kong (for max. 180 days for Macau Permanent Resident)
- Eligibility: Residence in Macau (compulsory for all Macau residents at the age of 5)
- Cost: Registration: MOP$90; Renewal: MOP$90; Replacement: MOP$60; Applicants who lack the financial ability to pay application fees due to Unemployment or Disability can apply to be exempted

Macau Resident Identity Card

Chinese name
- Traditional Chinese: 澳門特別行政區永久性居民身份證
- Simplified Chinese: 澳门特别行政区永久性居民身份证
Transcriptions
Yue: Cantonese
- Jyutping: ou3 mun4*2 dak6 bit6 hang4 zing3 keoi1 wing5 gau2 sing3 geoi1 man4 san1 fan6*2 zing3

non-permanent card
- Traditional Chinese: 澳門特別行政區非永久性居民身份證
- Simplified Chinese: 澳门特别行政区非永久性居民身份证
Transcriptions
Yue: Cantonese
- Jyutping: ou3 mun4*2 dak6 bit6 hang4 zing3 keoi1 fei1 wing5 gau2 sing3 geoi1 man4 san1 fan6*2 zing3

Portuguese name
- Portuguese: (permanent); Bilhete de Identidade de Residente Permanente da R.A.E.M. (non-permanent); Bilhete de Identidade de Residente não Permanente da R.A.E.M.

The Macau Resident Identity Card (Chinese: 澳門居民身份證; Portuguese: Bilhete de Identidade de Residente) or BIR is an official identity card issued by the Identification Services Bureau of Macau. There are two types of Resident Identity Cards: one for permanent residents and one for non-permanent residents.

== Macau Permanent Resident Identity Card ==
The Macau resident (permanent) ID card (Chinese: 澳門特別行政區永久性居民身份證; Portuguese: Bilhete de Identidade de Residente Permanente da R.A.E.M.), is for permanent residents of Macau, and is also valid for travel to the Hong Kong Special Administrative Region, as long as the visit is no longer than 180 days and for business, transit or leisure. The current generation of contactless electronic identity card were first issued in 2013 as the second-generation, and then re-issued in December 2023 as the third-generation, replacing the first-generation contact-based electronic identity card issued from 2002. The cards replace the old Bilhete de Identidade Cidadão Estrangeiro (BICE).

=== Eligibility ===
- Holder of the Certificate of Entitlement to the Right of abode in the Macau SAR, or
- Born in Macau and one of the applicant's legal ascendant(s) was a Macau resident at the time of birth
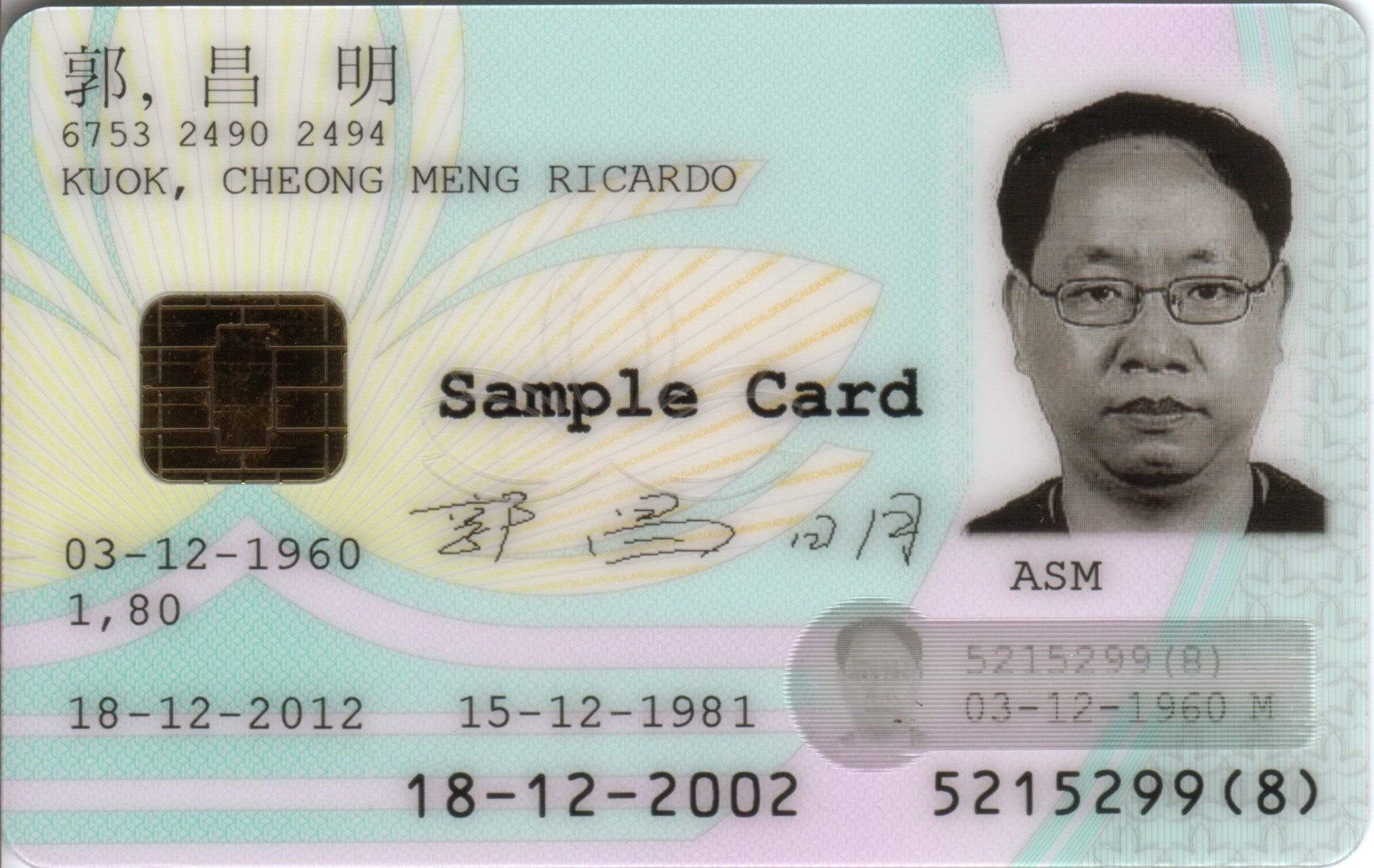
The front of a first-generation (2002) Macau permanent resident identity card (contact-based)

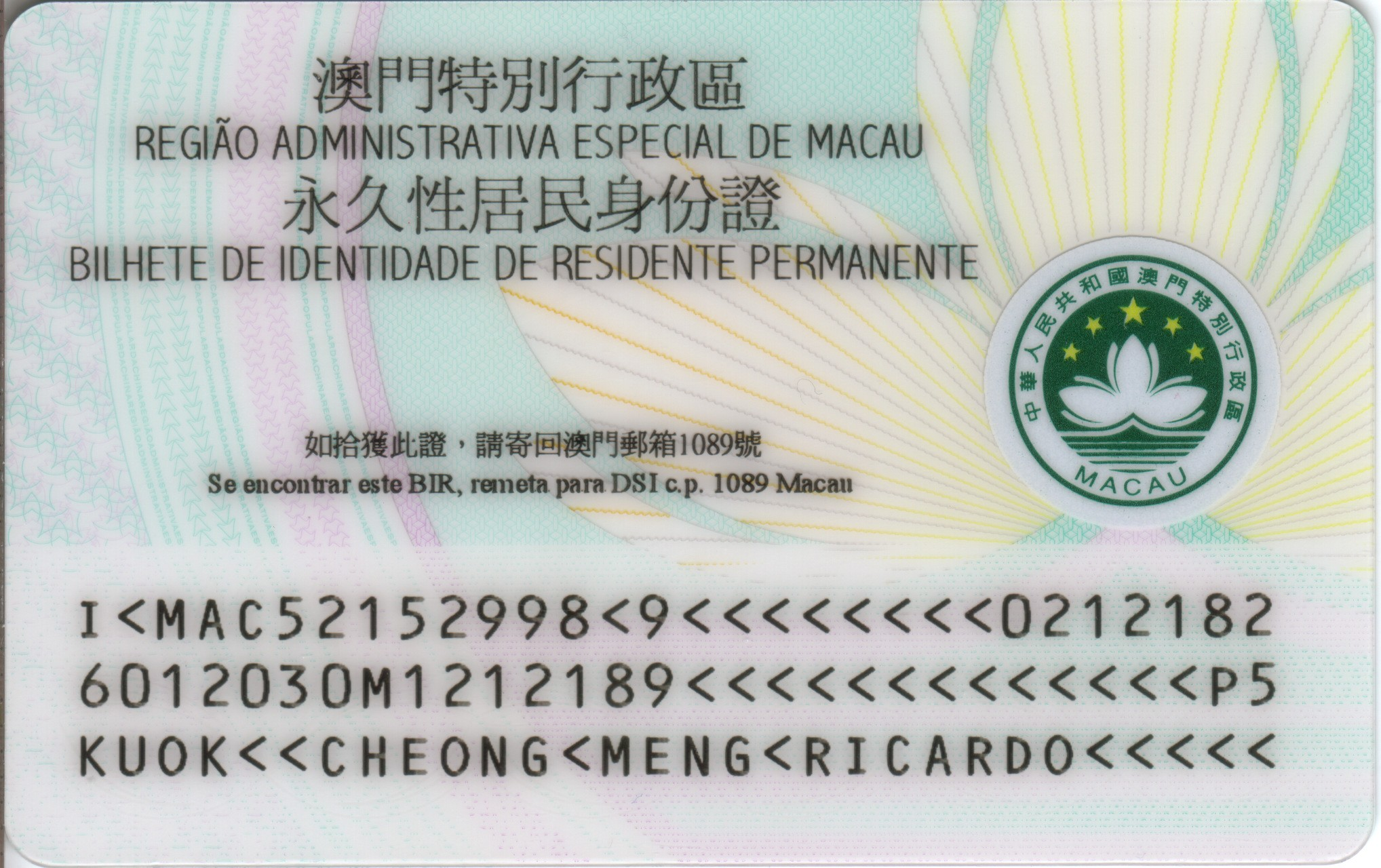
The reverse of a first-generation (2002) Macau permanent resident identity card (contact-based)
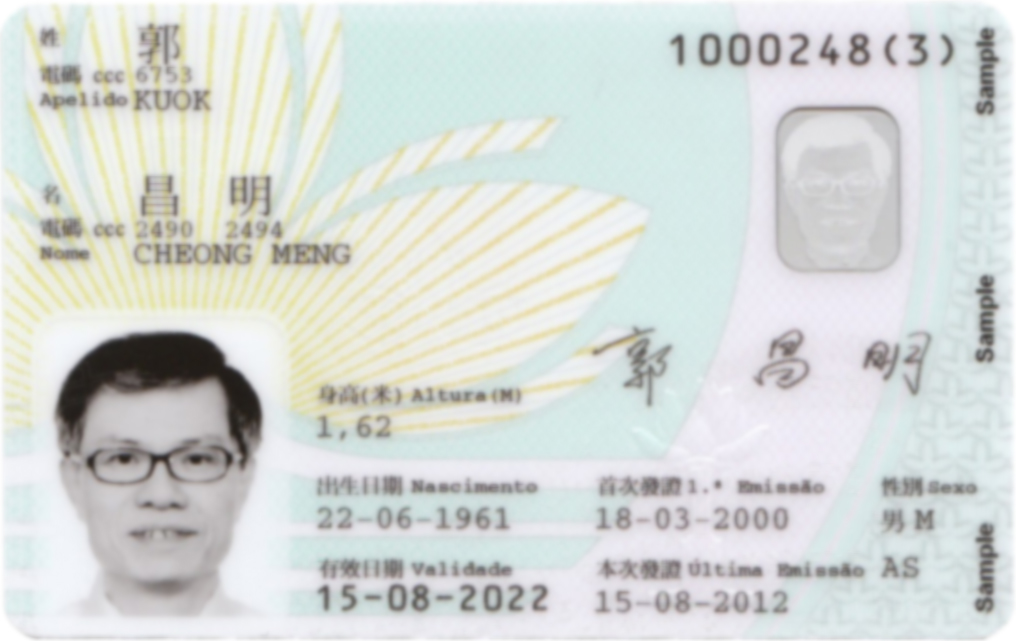
The front of a second-generation (2013) Macau permanent resident identity card (contact-based)

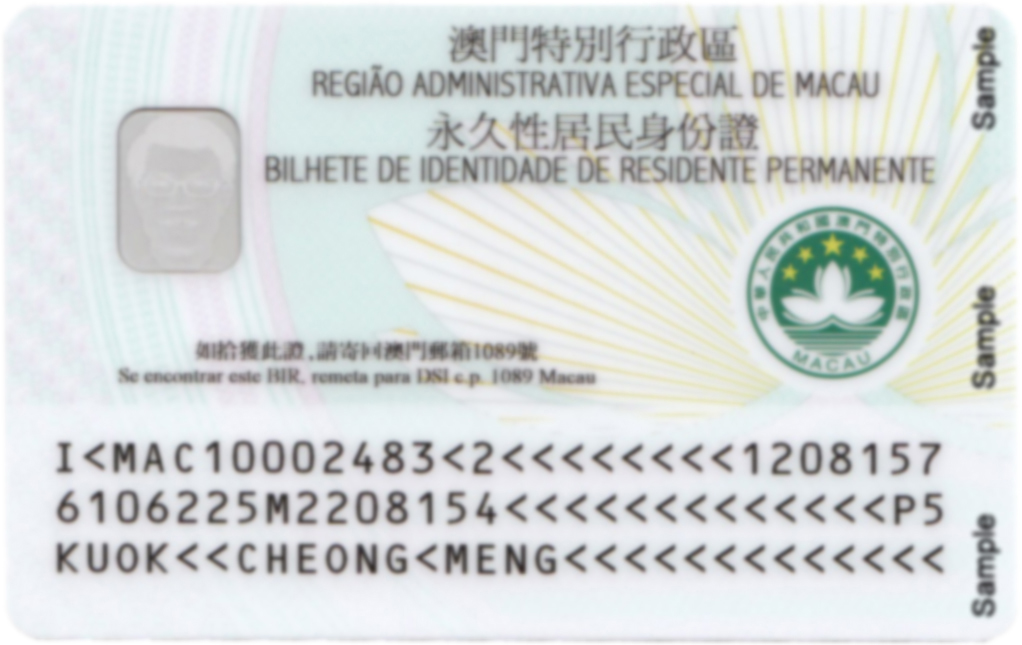
The reverse of a second-generation (2013) Macau permanent resident identity card (contact-based)

== Macau Non-Permanent Resident Identity Card ==
The Macau resident (non-permanent) ID card (Chinese: 澳門特別行政區非永久性居民身份證; Portuguese: Bilhete de Identidade de Residente não Permanente da R.A.E.M.), is for non-permanent residents of Macau.

=== Eligibility ===
- Holder of One-way Exit Permit of the People's Republic of China,
- Holder of a Certificado de Residência issued by the police in Macau, or
- Holders of Residence Permit "Guia de Autorização de Residência"
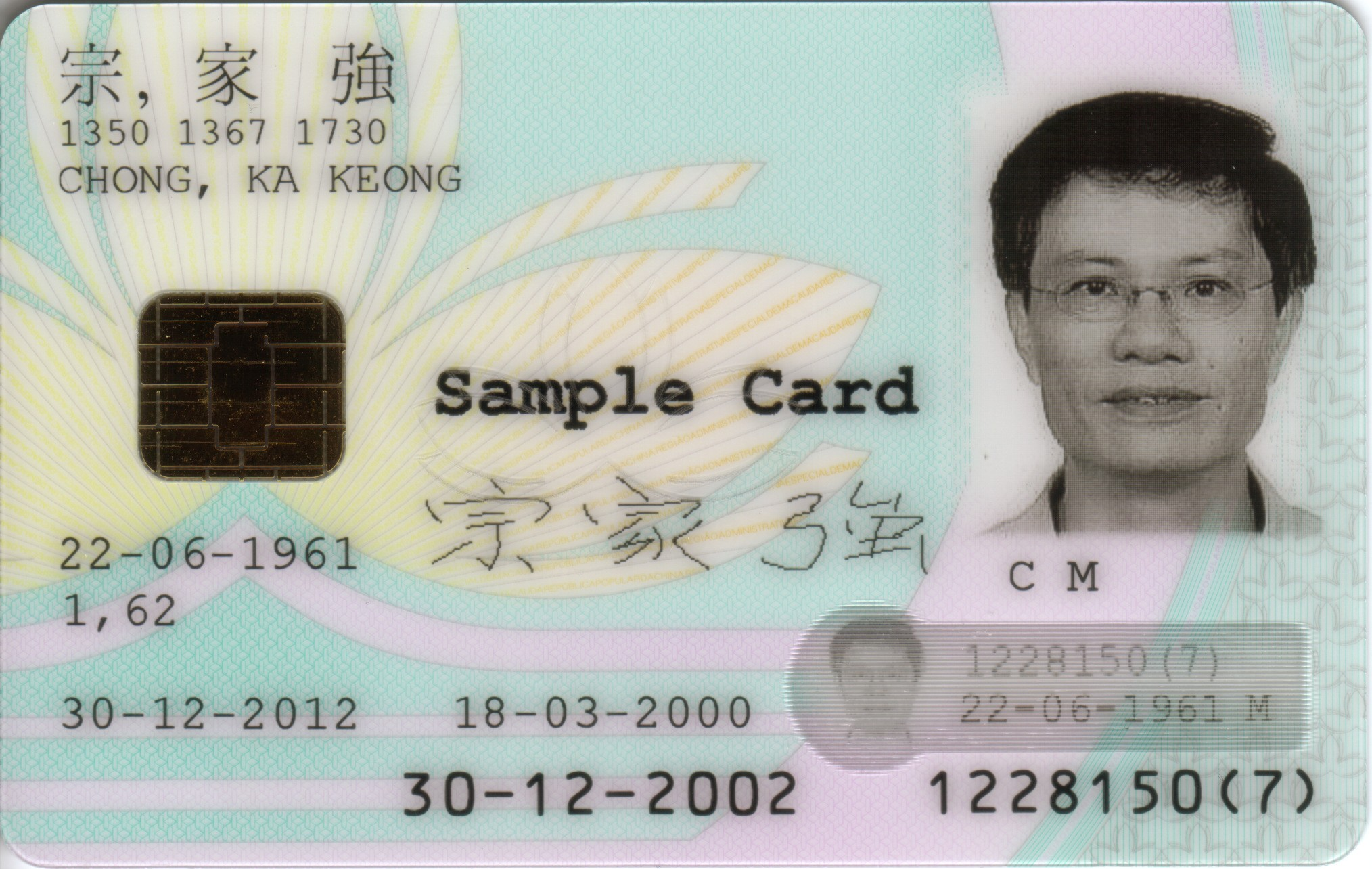
The front side of a first-generation (2002) Macau non-permanent resident identity card (contact-based)

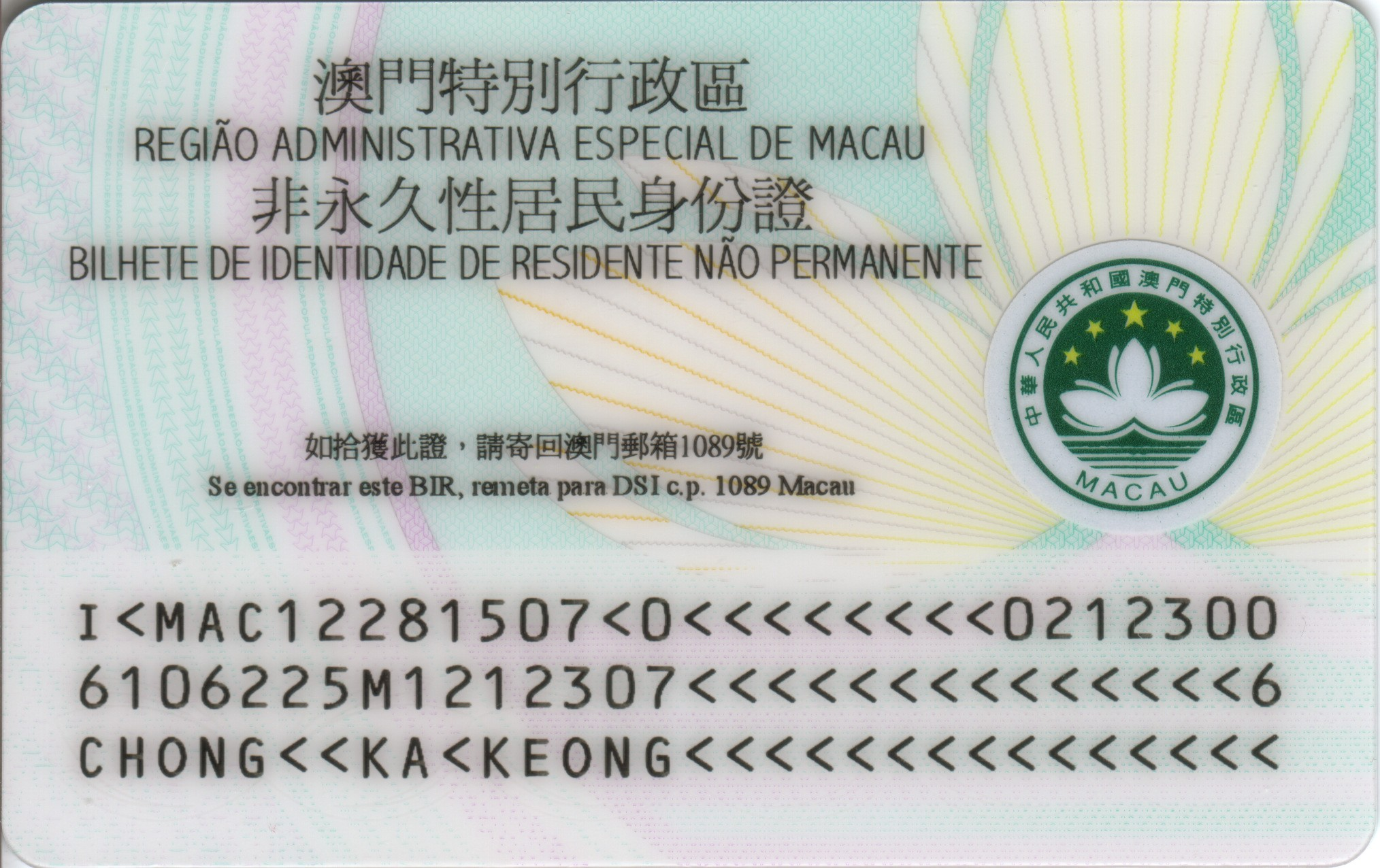
The reverse of a first-generation (2002) Macau non-permanent resident identity card (contact-based)

== Application ==
New applications for a BIR require a valid birth certificate; photocopies of legal ascendant(s) identification documents; and, if in possession of a Hong Kong Identity Card, a photocopy of the card; and a recent photograph (or can choose to have on taken at time of application.) Applicants are required to provide documentation to prove marital status, i.e. marriage certificate, divorce certificate, etc. Other documents may also be required depending on the applicants status in Macau and mainland China.

To renew the BIR, the old BIR, photograph and documentation to prove any change in status (marital, resident, personal information) is required. There is an additional fee if the original BIR can not be presented at time of application for renewal.

== Description ==
=== Information on the face of the card ===
- embedded chip
- Digital photograph
- Surname, Given Name (in Chinese, Chinese telegraph code, and Portuguese)
- Date of Birth (DD-MM-YYYY)
- Date of Issue (DD-MM-YYYY)
- Validity Date (DD-MM-YYYY) - expiry date
- Date of First Issue (DD-MM-YYYY)
- Signature
- ID number (8 digit numeric: XXXXXXX(X))
- Multiple laser image of photo, ID number, sex and date of birth)
- Code for place of birth and sex
- Height (metres)

=== Information on the rear of the card ===
- Name of type of card ("Permanent Resident Identity Card" or "Non-Permanent Resident Identity Card") in Chinese and Portuguese
- Reference to legal references on the issuance of this card
- Machine-readable zone (OCR lines)
- Seal of the Government of Macau

== Use as a travel document ==
Holders of a Macau Permanent Resident Identity Card enjoy permit-free entry to visit Hong Kong for up to 180 days. This does not apply to holders of Non-Permanent Resident Identity Cards, but such non-permanent residents may be eligible to apply for a Visit Permit for Residents of Macao to HKSAR, which grants holders permit-free entry to visit Hong Kong for up to 30 days.

== See also ==
- Macao Special Administrative Region passport
- Macao Special Administrative Region Travel Permit
- Visit Permit for Residents of Macao to HKSAR
- Hong Kong Identity Card
- Resident Identity Card used in the People's Republic of China
- National Identification Card (Republic of China) used in the Republic of China
