= Quality Migrant Admission Scheme =

Hong Kong immigration system

- Traditional Chinese: 優秀人才入境計劃
- Simplified Chinese: 优秀人才入境计划
Transcriptions
Standard Mandarin
- Hanyu Pinyin: Yōuxiù Réncái Rùjìng Jìhuà
Yue: Cantonese
- Yale Romanization: Yāu sau yàhn chòih yahp gíng gai waahk
- Jyutping: Jau^{1}-sau^{3} Jan^{4}-coi^{4} Jap^{6}-ging^{2} Gai^{3}-waak^{6}

The Quality Migrant Admission Scheme ("QMAS") is a points-based immigration system in the Hong Kong. It was first announced in February 2006, and began accepting applications in June of the same year; by September 2023, more than 20000 people had been admitted to residence in Hong Kong under the scheme.

QMAS aims to attract highly skilled overseas-born individuals to settle in Hong Kong for enhancing the economic competitiveness of Hong Kong globally. Those successful are not required to have a valid job offer before entering into Hong Kong for settlement. All applicants under the QMAS have to fulfil a set number of requirements before they are awarded points under either of the 2 points-based tests – that is, either the Achievement-based Points Test or General Points Test.

Before 2023, this used to be a quota-based scheme, and those successful with had to compete against the other QMAS applicants for quota allocation.

Nationals of certain countries – Cuba, Afghanistan and North Korea – are not eligible for the QMAS of Hong Kong, while the limitation on citizens from Vietnam, Laos and Nepal has been lifted.

According to Lai Tung-kwok, the application process can take half a year.

== History ==
General points test
Age
Points		Years old	
Old	New	Years old	
0	30	18-24	
25	30	25-29	
30	30	30-34	
25	30	35-39	
15	20	40-44	
5	15	45-50	
N/A	0	51+	
Education
Points		Degrees	
Old	New	Degrees	
45	40	Two doctorates	
40	40	One doctorate or two master's	
30	20	One master's or two bachelor's	
20	10	One bachelor's	
N/A	30	(Additional) Degree from a renowned institution recognized internationally	
Working experience in a job requiring a bachelor's degree or professional qualification
Points		Years	
Old	New	Total	Managerial
50	40	10	>5
40	30	5	>2
30	15	5	0-2
0	5	2	0-2
Languages spoken and written fluently
Points		Languages	
Old	New	Languages	
20	20	Both Chinese and English	
0	15	One of Chinese or English, plus an additional language	
0	10	One of Chinese or English	
Spoken fluency in Chinese may be demonstrated using either Cantonese or Mandarin
Add points for each qualifying item
Points		Description	
Old	New	Description	
5	5	Per unmarried child under the age of 18, up to 10 points	
5	5	Accompanied by a spouse holding at least a bachelor's degree	
5	5	Direct family member is a Hong Kong permanent resident	

=== Creation ===
With the aim of attracting talented people from mainland China and the rest of the world to settle and work in Hong Kong, the QMAS set up admissions criteria under which applicants could be admitted to residence in Hong Kong without the prior offer of local employment required for a normal working visa. The scheme was first announced in February 2006. It began accepting applications on 28 June of that year, with a quota of 1,000 applicants. The scheme included two methods of assessment: a general points test, under which applicants would be awarded points based on their education, age, working experience, language abilities, and family background, and an achievement-based test for people such as Olympic medalists, Nobel laureates, or scientists and professionals with significant recognition in their field. The minimum passing mark under the general points test is 80 points.

Six people applied in the first week; however, the government waited until November 2006 to issue the first visa under the scheme, to pianist Lang Lang. In 2007, 582 people applied under the scheme, of whom 322 (55.3%) were admitted, 42 through the achievement-based points test and 280 through the general points test. 188 came from mainland China.

=== Relaxation of criteria ===
As early as November 2007, the government floated the idea of loosening the criteria for admission under the QMAS, due to the underwhelming response. Details of the amendments were announced in January 2008; the age limit for applicants was raised from 50 to 55, points would be awarded for as little as two years of working experience as opposed to five before the amendment, and applicants could receive points for abilities in languages other than Chinese or English.

Following the amendment, the number of applicants under the scheme increased slightly; however, the passing rate dropped, according to government sources, with only 60% of short-listed applications approved as of February 2008, compared to 71% before the revision. By the end of May that year, the number of people admitted under the scheme drew near to 500; however, this still formed only a minute proportion of the roughly 210,000 non-local professionals working in Hong Kong. For 2008, 1,317 people applied for admission under the scheme, an increase of 130% over the 2007 figure.

In total, from June 2006 to August 2013, 9,932 people applied to settle in Hong Kong under QMAS, among whom 2,553 (26%) were accepted. The acceptance rate fell sharply from a peak of 41% in 2008 to 15% in 2012, which was the highest year to date for the number of applications received. Of the successful applicants, 1,997 (78%) were from mainland China, 291 (11%) were from other parts of the Asia-Pacific region, 163 (6.4%) were from North America, 94 (3.7%) were from Europe, and 8 (0.3%) were from South America or Africa.

In November 2020, the quota per year was increased from 1,000 to 2,000. In November 2021, the quota was further increased from 2,000 to 4,000 per year. In October 2022, John Lee removed the limit of 4,000 for a period of 2 years.

In October 2023, the government said it would now allow people from Vietnam, Laos and Nepal to apply for the visa.

=== Statistics ===
In May 2020, statistics from the 2019 year were provided by the immigration department. In 2019, a total of 874 people were approved under the scheme. Of the 874,

- 845 were approved under the General Points Test, and the other 29 were approved under the Achievement-based Test
- 565 were male, and 309 were female
- 647 were aged between 18–39, 140 were aged between 40–44, 66 were aged between 45–50, and 21 were aged between 50 or above
- 803 were from mainland China, 18 were from the United States, 14 were from Canada, 8 were from Australia, and 31 were from elsewhere

In 2022, 2,845 people were approved under the program, and in 2023, 12,969 people were approved, with 98.5% coming from mainland China.

== Requirements ==
1. Age: Applicants must be aged 18 years and up
2. Financial Requirement: Applicants must be able to demonstrate that they are capable of supporting and accommodating themselves and their dependents, if any, on their own without relying on public assistance during their stay in Hong Kong;
3. Good Character: Applicants must meet normal immigration and security requirements. They should not have any criminal or adverse immigration record in Hong Kong or elsewhere;
4. Language Proficiency: Applicants must be proficient in Chinese (Mandarin or Cantonese) or English;
5. Basic Educational Qualification: Applicants must have a good education background, normally a first degree supported by documentary evidence. In special circumstances, good technical qualifications, proven professional abilities and/or experience and achievements supported by documentary evidence may be considered.
6. Nationality: Nationals of Afghanistan, Cuba, and North Korea may not apply under QMAS.

== Notable examples ==
- Barry Beck, Canadian National Hockey League player
- Hins Cheung, Singer
- Hu Jun, Chinese actor
- Lan Rao, Chinese soprano
- Lang Lang, Chinese pianist
- Li Ning, Chinese Olympics gold medalist for gymnastics
- Ronnie O'Sullivan, English snooker player
- Neil Robertson, Australian snooker player
- Tang Wei, Chinese actress
- Judd Trump, English Snooker player
- Jimmy White, English snooker player
- Kyren Wilson, English snooker player
- Zhang Ziyi, Chinese actress
- Zhou Mi, Chinese badminton player
- Zhou Xun, Chinese actress
