= United States travel document =

Travel document issued to United States lawful permanent residents

Travel Document (Form I-327/Form I-571)
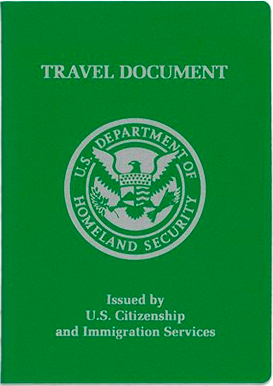
- Specimen cover of a USCIS issued travel document to a permanent resident

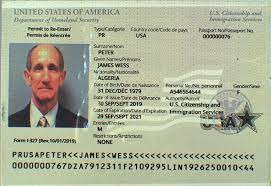
- Identity page
- Type: Identification, Travel Document
- Issued by: USCIS (Currently); BCIS (2003); INS (prior to 2003)
- First issued: 1951? (first refugee travel document); 1952 (first reentry permit); 2003 (first version with joint design); 2019 (current version)
- Purpose: Permit to Reenter/Refugee Travel Document
- Valid in: United States
- Eligibility: lawful US refugee or asylee (Refugee Travel Document); Permanent residence (Reentry Permit)
- Expiration: Refugee Travel Document: At most one year Reentry Permit: At most two years
- Cost: $630 (reentry permit) $135 (refugee travel document for minors) $165 (refugee travel document for adults)

United States travel document, also known as the USCIS Travel Document since 2004, is a travel document issued by the United States Citizenship and Immigration Services (USCIS) to eligible non-U.S. citizen residents. It is a green passport-like booklet with the words Travel Document, a symbol, and other official wording in blue-gray.

To obtain a travel document, applicants must file Form I-131 and undergo biometric data collection while in the United States (usually before departure). This process incurs a fee and can take months or even years. Alternatively, applicants can choose to collect their documents from a U.S. embassy or consulate abroad after completing biometric data collection.

== History ==
=== Reentry Permit ===
The formal statutory authority for “reentry permits” comes from the Immigration and Nationality Act of 1952 (INA), enacted June 27, 1952. Under Section 223 of the INA (now codified at 8 U.S.C. § 1203), the Attorney General was empowered to issue a “permit to reenter the United States” to lawful permanent residents (LPRs) intending to depart temporarily and return.

As of that 1952 law, the “reentry permit” was thus a legally codified, official mechanism for permanent residents who planned to travel abroad but return and maintain their resident status.

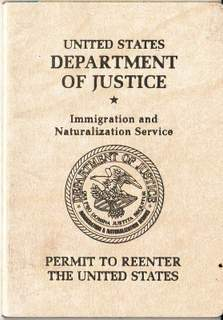
Cover of an U.S Re-entry permit issued in 1994 by INS

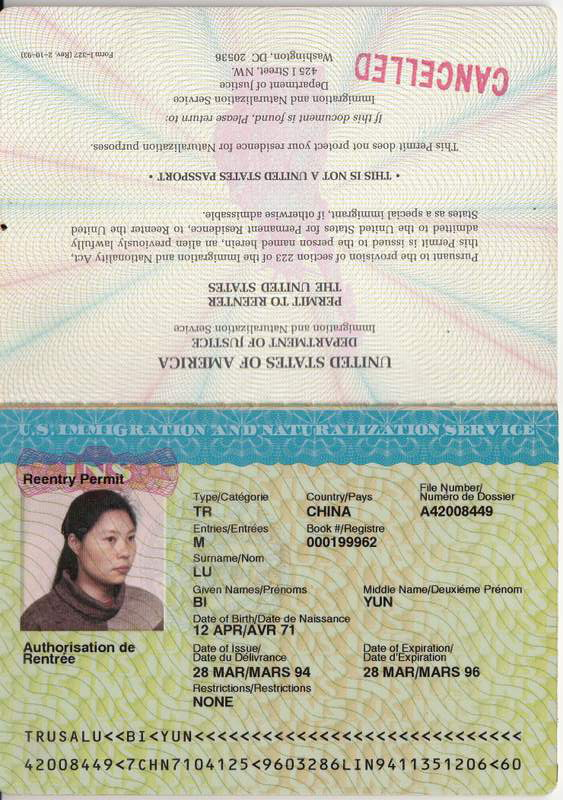
Identity page

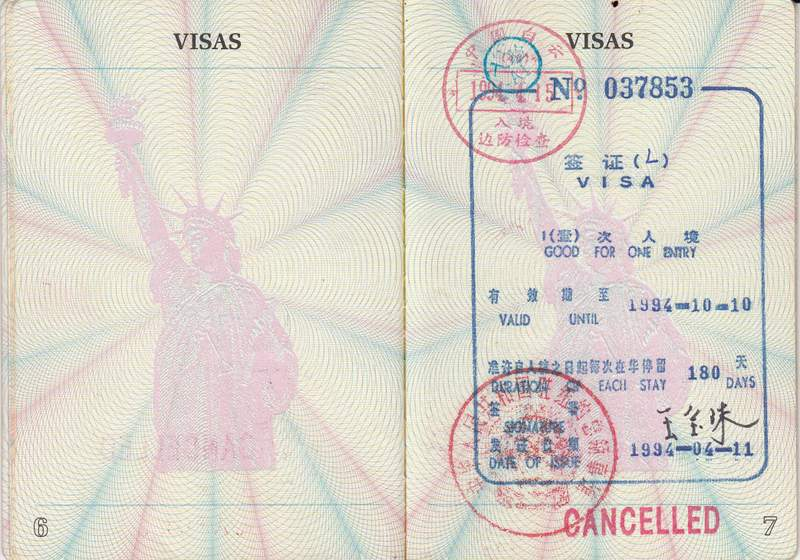
Visa pages

=== Refugee Travel Document ===
The Refugee Travel Document in United States is considered to be issued pursuant, at least in part, to the 1951 Convention Relating to the Status of Refugees. Prior to 2003, both the Refugee Travel Document and the Re-entry Permit were issued by the Immigration and Naturalization Service (INS), but the two documents differed in both design and appearance.

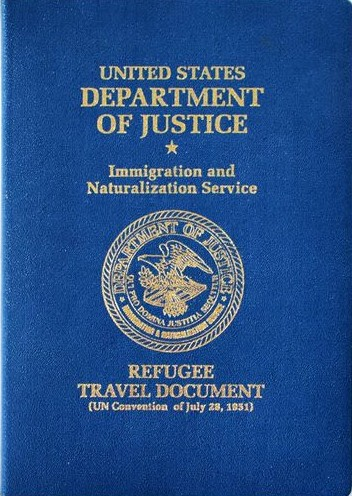
Cover of an U.S refugee travel document issued by INS

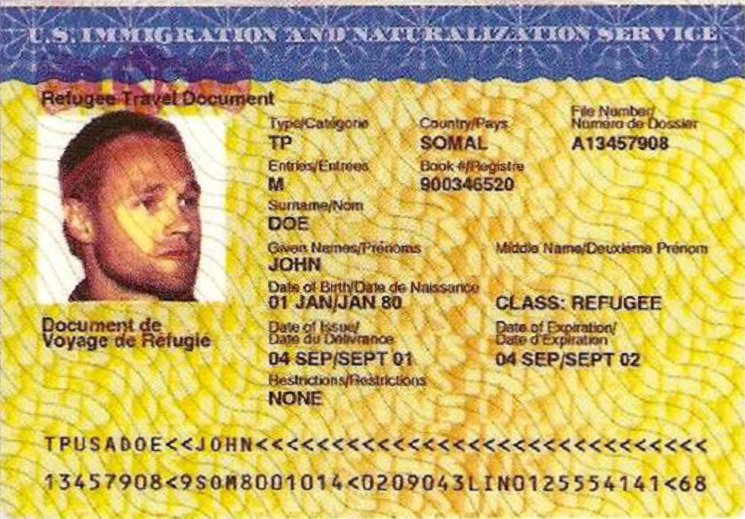
Identity page

=== Joint Designs ===
In 2003, the Immigration and Naturalization Service (INS) under the Department of Justice, which had been responsible for issuing travel documents to foreign nationals and providing other immigration-related services in the country, was abolished, and all of its functions were transferred to the newly established Department of Homeland Security. That same year, the Bureau of Citizenship and Immigration Services (BCIS) — predecessor to USCIS under the DHS — announced a redesign of its travel‑document booklets (I-327 for reentry, and I‑571 for refugee travel) to a new “passport‑style travel document” with enhanced security features to reduce fraud. This was the first version that fully integrated these two categories of travel documents with distinct purposes into a single, unified design.

On August 23, 2004, The Bureau of Citizenship and Immigration Services (BCIS) officially changed its name to the current U.S. Citizenship and Immigration Services (USCIS). However, the redesigned alien travel document introduced by BCIS one year ago continued to be used until 2010 when USCIS started to issue a newer design. During this interim period, travel documents issued by USCIS were largely identical in design to those issued by BCIS in 2003, with the sole substantive change being the replacement of the issuing authority’s name.

Starting in March 5, 2008, USCIS required all applicants filing Form I-131 to provide biometric data. This change was broadly consistent with contemporaneous technological updates to US passports; however, unlike passports, the collected biometric information is stored in a database rather than on the document itself. Travel documents (Forms I-327 and I-571) therefore remained, and continue to remain non-biometric documents without embedded electronic chips.

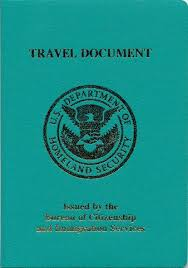
Cover of an U.S travel document issued by BCIS/USCIS after 2003

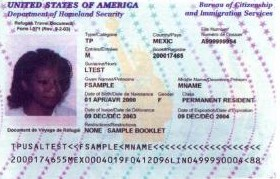
Identity page of a BCIS travel document, note the name of the authority printed in the upper right corner of the page (Bureau of Citizenship and Immigration Services)

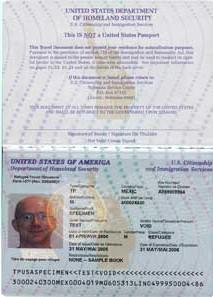
Identity page of a USCIS travel document issued after 2003

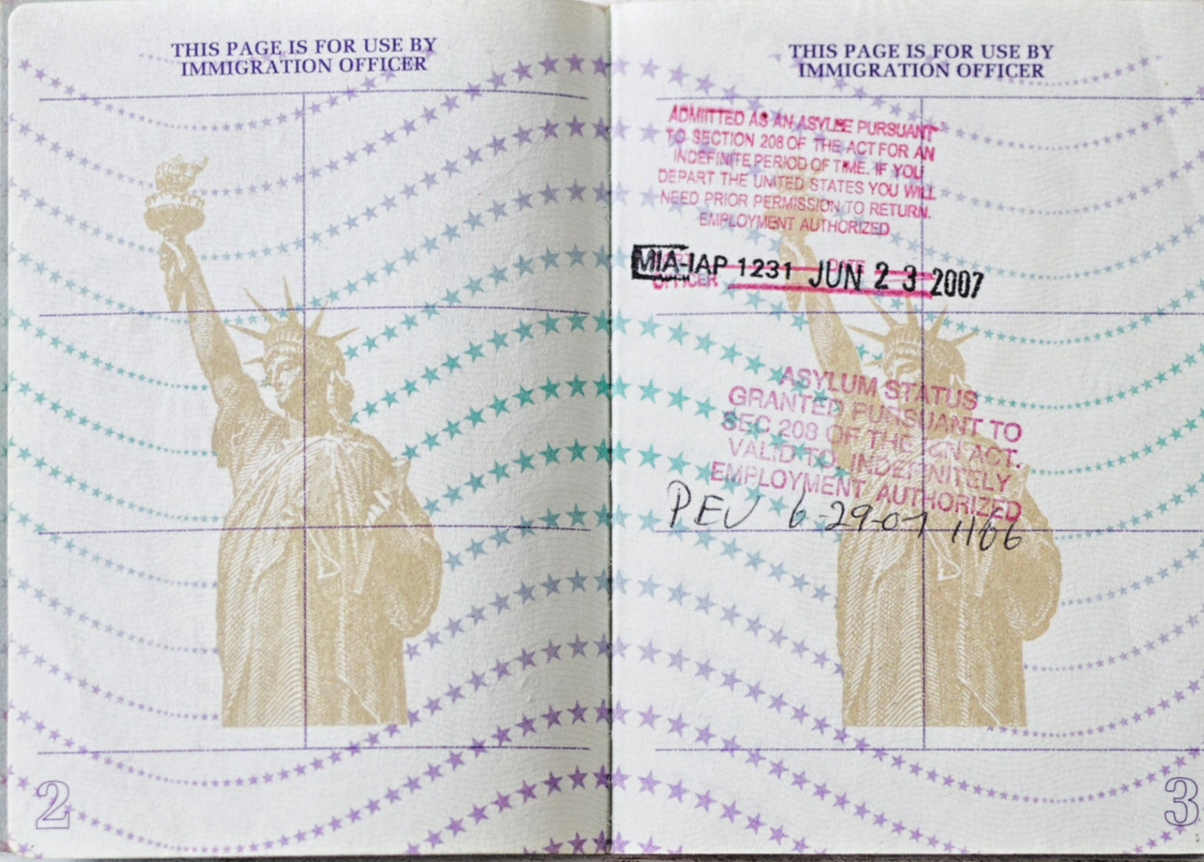
Visa page

==== 2010 update ====
In 2010, the U.S. Citizenship and Immigration Services began implementing a series of technical and design updates to the documents it issues, including the travel documents. Under the revised design, the cover color of U.S. travel documents was changed from teal to dark blue, while the lettering on the cover was rendered in gold.

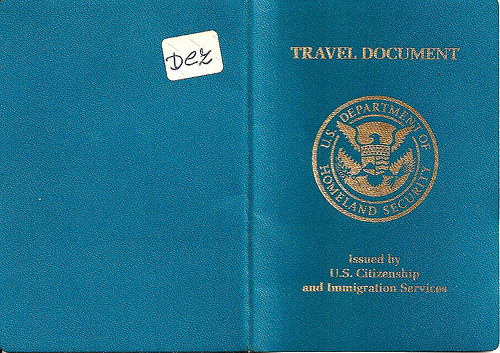
Cover

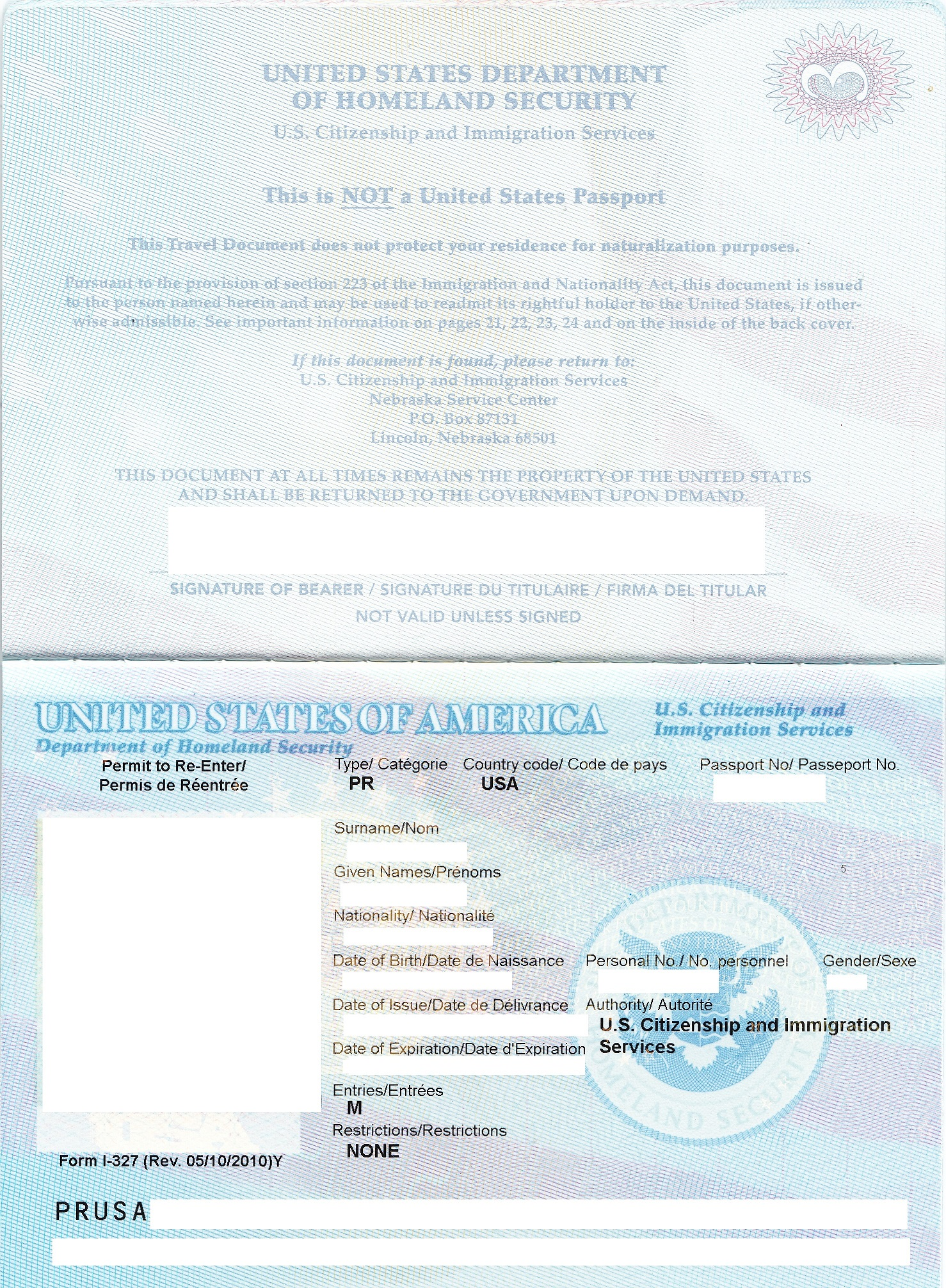
Identity page

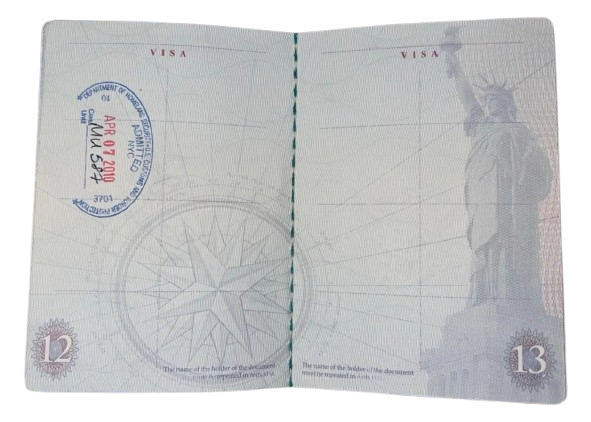
Visa page

== Types ==
At present, USCIS issues two types of booklet-style travel documents, which are broadly similar in appearance in their current versions. They are distinguished by the text printed in the upper-left corner of the data page: the Re-entry Permit reads “Permit to Re-Enter,” while the Refugee Travel Document is labeled “Refugee Travel Document.”

- Re-entry Permit (Form I-327): a travel document similar to a certificate of identity, issued by the United States Citizenship and Immigration Services to U.S. lawful permanent residents to allow them to travel abroad for longer periods and return to the United States. Individuals whose application for permanent residency has not yet been approved can apply instead for advance parole (Form I-512).
- Refugee Travel Document (Form I-571): a travel document issued to refugees or asylees. It shares the same design as the Re-entry Permit but does not provide the long-term overseas travel authorization granted by the latter. It is likewise issued by U.S. Citizenship and Immigration Services (USCIS), and the two documents are nearly identical in appearance.

== Content ==
=== Format ===
A Travel Document, in both forms (Refugee Travel Document and Permit to Re-Enter), features the seal of the Department of Homeland Security instead of the Great Seal of the United States. Above the seal the words "TRAVEL DOCUMENT" appears in all capital letters. Below the seal is the legend "Issued by U.S. Citizenship and Immigration Services" in upper and lower case.

In addition to the front cover design, the 2019 edition of the travel document features an embossed image of the torch held by the Statue of Liberty on the back cover. This is the first time that a reverse-side design has been incorporated into travel documents (including passports) produced by the United States.

The current version of the USCIS travel document contains a total of 24 interior pages for use; if including the front and back covers, the document comprises 26 pages in total. The first page following the cover features an illustration of U.S. Route 66, and is immediately followed by the biographical data page.

=== Languages ===
Unlike the current version of U.S. passports, travel documents issued by USCIS are printed exclusively in English and French. This practice reflects a resolution adopted by the League of Nations at a 1920 conference on the standardization of international travel documents, which recommended the use of French in conjunction with each country’s national language. It is consistent with earlier United States passport versions prior to the addition of Spanish during the second administration of Bill Clinton.

=== Data page ===
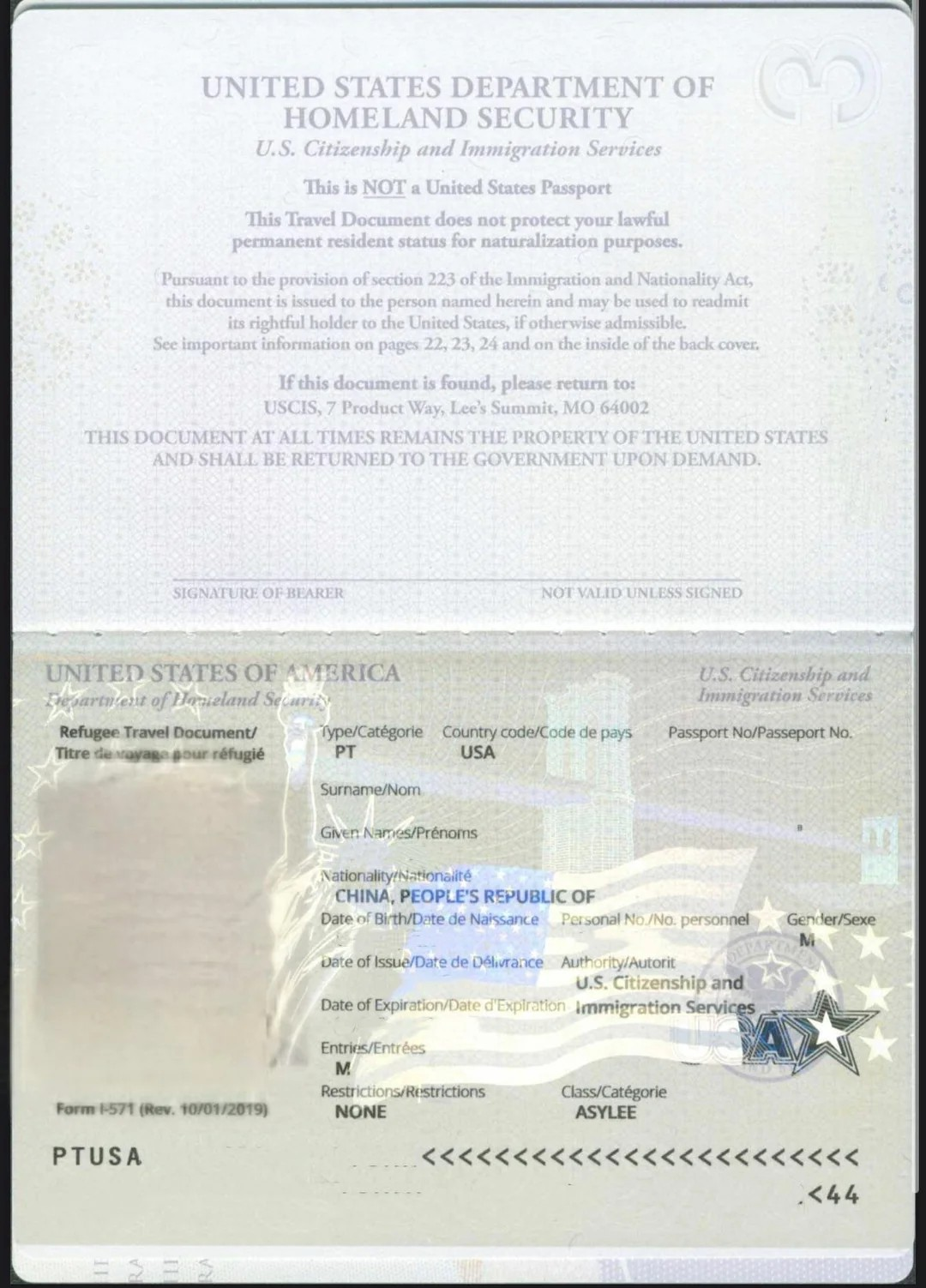
Signature page and data page of a USCIS travel document (2019–present)

The second page is the data page, it contains the following information:

- Photograph
- Type [of document, which is "PT" for "permanent resident travel"]
- Country code [of the issuing country, which is "USA" for "United States of America"]
- Passport Number
- Surname
- Given Name
- Nationality
- Date of Birth
- Personal Number
- Gender (M, F)
- Date of Issue
- Authority (U.S. Citizenship and Immigration Services)
- Date of Expiration
- Entries (M)
- Restrictions

The machine-readable zone is present at the bottom of the page.

=== Message page ===
The third page contains the information of this travel document and a space for signature. Since the holders of this document are not U.S. citizens, the U.S. government is not obligated to provide the consular protections available to U.S. citizens abroad. Hence the message page does not contain the official message found in U.S. passports requesting protection for citizens; instead, it features a statement from the U.S. Department of Homeland Security as the following:

UNITED STATES DEPARTMENT OF HOMELAND SECURITY

U.S. Citizenship and Immigration Services

This is NOT a United States Passport

This Travel Document does not protect your lawful permanent resident status for naturalization purposes.

Pursuant to the provision of section 223 of the Immigration and Nationality Act, this document is issued to the person named herein and may be used to readmit its rightful holder to the United States, if otherwise admissible. See important information on pages 22, 23, 24 and on the inside of the back cover.

If this document is found, please return to:

USCIS, 7 Product Way, Lee's Summit, MO 64002

THIS DOCUMENT AT ALL TIMES REMAINS THE PROPERTY OF THE UNITED STATES AND SHALL BE RETURNED TO THE GOVERNMENT UPON DEMAND.

This page has a line for the signature of a travel document holder. The document is not valid until it is signed by the holder in black or blue ink.

=== Visa pages ===
Pages 4 through 21 are designated as visa pages. As with the U.S. passports, these pages are printed with images depicting scenic views such as landscapes and landmarks from across the United States, although the specific motifs and design details differ markedly from those used in U.S. passports. In addition, each page includes a grid containing six blank boxes for official stamps, a feature not found in U.S. passports. Above the grid appears the inscription, “THIS PAGE IS FOR USE BY IMMIGRATION OFFICER.”

== Purpose ==
USCIS Form I-131 (Application for a Travel Document) is used to apply for the re-entry permit and other travel documents. This form can only be filed while the applicant is still in the United States.

=== Reentry Permit ===
The re-entry permit enables a lawful permanent resident (LPR) of the U.S. to travel outside the United States for time periods longer than one year and establishes that the LPR does not intend to abandon residence in the U.S. A re-entry permit prevents two problems:

- An LPRs absence from the U.S. for over one year voids their Permanent Resident Card, in turn rendering the LPR as invalid for re-entry to the U.S.
- An LPR taking up residence in an alternative country to the U.S (prior to the one year point) voids their Permanent Resident Card as the U.S. Citizen and Immigration Services considers the action as an abandonment of U.S. permanent residency

If a U.S. permanent resident intends to take a trip abroad for over one year, they may apply for a re-entry permit. The resident is granted to travel for up to two years abroad without having to obtain a returning resident visa. It establishes that the permanent resident did not intend to abandon permanent resident status.

Another purpose for the re-entry permit is to serve as an international travel document instead of a passport for U.S. permanent residents who are stateless, who cannot get a passport from their country, or who wish to travel to a place where they cannot use their passport. A permanent resident who obtained permanent residence as a refugee may either apply for a refugee travel document or a re-entry permit, but not both.

=== Refugee Travel Document ===
The Refugee Travel Document is issued pursuant to Article 28, United Nations Convention of July 28, 1951; the Protocol of January 31, 1967, relating to the Status Refugees, and Part 223.1(b), of Title 8, CFR. It is issued solely to provide the bearer with a travel document that does not affect or prejudice the bearer's nationality in anyway.

The bearer of a refugee travel document is entitled to return to the United States within the period of validity of the travel document and may be accorded the immigration status specified therein.

== Usage ==
=== International Acceptance ===
==== Schengen Area ====
As of 2013, most Schengen Area countries accept the U.S. Re-entry Permit for visa issuance purposes. The Re-entry Permit is considered as an Alien's Travel Document.

Only Slovakia has explicitly indicated they will accept it, while other countries did not provide any information on their acceptance of it.

The following are the countries that accept USCIS travel document as a valid form of alien's passport:

- Austria
- Belgium
- Czech Republic
- Denmark
- Finland
- France
- Germany
- Greece
- Hungary
- Iceland
- Italy
- Latvia
- Liechtenstein
- Lithuania
- Luxembourg
- Netherlands
- Norway
- Portugal
- Slovakia
- Slovenia
- Spain
- Sweden
- Switzerland
- Moldova
- Albania
- Romania
- Bosnia and Herzegovina

== See also ==
- 1954 Convention Travel Document
- 1954 Convention Relating to the Status of Stateless Persons
- 1961 Convention on the Reduction of Statelessness
- Nansen passport
