= Humanitarian visa =

Type of visa

Humanitarian visas are visas granted by some countries in order to fulfill their international obligation to protect refugees from persecution. The criteria in the Convention Relating to the Status of Refugees are often used in assessing whether or not there is a legitimate claim for protection. It defines a refugee as a person who:

- is outside their country of origin or legal residence
- is unable, or unwilling to return to their country of legal residence because of a legitimate fear of persecution regarding their race, religion, nationality, group membership, or a political belief, as defined by the United Nations High Commissioner for Refugees
- has not been convicted of a serious crime by a fair tribunal.

Persons primarily seeking better economic opportunities may reasonably quote war, famine, or environmental disasters as their main motive for leaving their countries of legal residence, for which reason humanitarian visas may be difficult to obtain.

== Australia ==
In Australia, humanitarian visas are listed as “Subclass 200” and have several distinct forms:

- 201: In-country Special Humanitarian Program Visa
- 202: Global Special Humanitarian Program Visa (“SHP”)
- 203: Emergency Rescue Visa
- 204: Woman at Risk Visa

The Australian theme for Refugee Week in 2026 is "A Million Stories", reflecting the fact that Australia has issued one million permanent humanitarian visas since 1947.

== European Union ==
=== Belgium ===
In 2013, Belgium established a structural resettlement programme, initially agreeing to resettle 100 refugees. However, due to the Syrian refugee crisis, the Belgian Government announced in November 2014 that it would increase its 2015 resettlement quota to 300, of which 225 Syrians (from Lebanon) and 75 Congolese refugees (from Burundi). The final decision regarding Belgium's quota size and allocation of refugees belongs to the country's State Secretary for Asylum Policy and Migration.

Belgium does not have any other such humanitarian admission programmes, and there is no explicit reference to a humanitarian visa in its legislation. However, on an ad hoc and discretionary basis, the State Secretary for Asylum Policy and Migration and the Federal Public Service Home Affairs grant visas on the basis of “humanitarian grounds," which are either short term (C-type) or long term (D-type) visas.

=== France ===
Between 2013 and 2016, France granted more than three thousand humanitarian visas to Syrian refugees to enter the country.

=== Switzerland ===
Switzerland is stricter in granting humanitarian visas, According to Swiss national law, Switzerland has the possibility to issue a humanitarian visa to individuals whose lives are imminently at risk, but the practice is very restrictive. Apart from a life-threatening situation, the State Secretariat for Migration generally requires that the individual has a link to Switzerland. In addition, the request for such a visa normally needs to be made in person at a Swiss representation.

== India ==
Following the overthrow of the Islamic Republic of Afghanistan by the Taliban in August 2021, the government of India introduced an "e-Emergency X-Misc Visa", a type of humanitarian electronic visa, for nationals of Afghanistan.

== Russia ==
Russia may issue humanitarian visas to stateless persons or citizens from countries such as the United States who may be considered potentially hostile, and traveling for a variety of reasons including cultural or political exchanges, sports events, scientific or technical conferences and providing temporary specialist services such as humanitarian relief.

== Americas ==
=== Argentina (Programa Siria) ===
Since 2014, Argentina has accepted asylum seekers originating from Syria through its humanitarian visa program Programa Siria ('Syria Programme'), particularly for those affected by the conflict in Syria. Adopting a sponsorship resettlement model—as opposed to a traditional resettlement programme—Argentina's Programa Siria grants temporary humanitarian visas for Syrian nationals sponsored by Argentinean individuals, organizations, or institutions for their living costs; after the temporary visa expires, Syrians may apply for permanent residency.

Since the program was adopted, the United Nations High Commissioner for Refugees has worked with the Argentinian Government to strengthen and consolidate it and to assess the possibilities of expanding a similar model to refugees coming from others countries of asylum.

=== Brazil ===
Brazil issues humanitarian visas to nationals or stateless residents of countries experiencing serious instability, armed conflict, disaster or violations of human rights. Brazil has designated Afghanistan, Haiti, Syria and Ukraine for this type of visa. Residency is granted initially for two years, after which the applicant may request permanent residency.

=== United States (humanitarian parole) ===
In the United States, humanitarian visas are also known as humanitarian parole, which are documents granted for short-term urgent humanitarian relief, typically for up to one year. People who would otherwise be unable to enter the United States may be granted such parole in exceptional personal circumstances; however, these do not permit them to obtain permanent residency.

== See also ==
- 1954 Convention Travel Document for stateless persons
- Certificate of identity for stateless persons or others
- Identity document
- Nansen passport the predecessor of the current Refugee travel document
- Refugee travel document issued by the country of origin
- Travel Document
