= Non-citizen travel document =

Travel document issued by a country to non-citizens

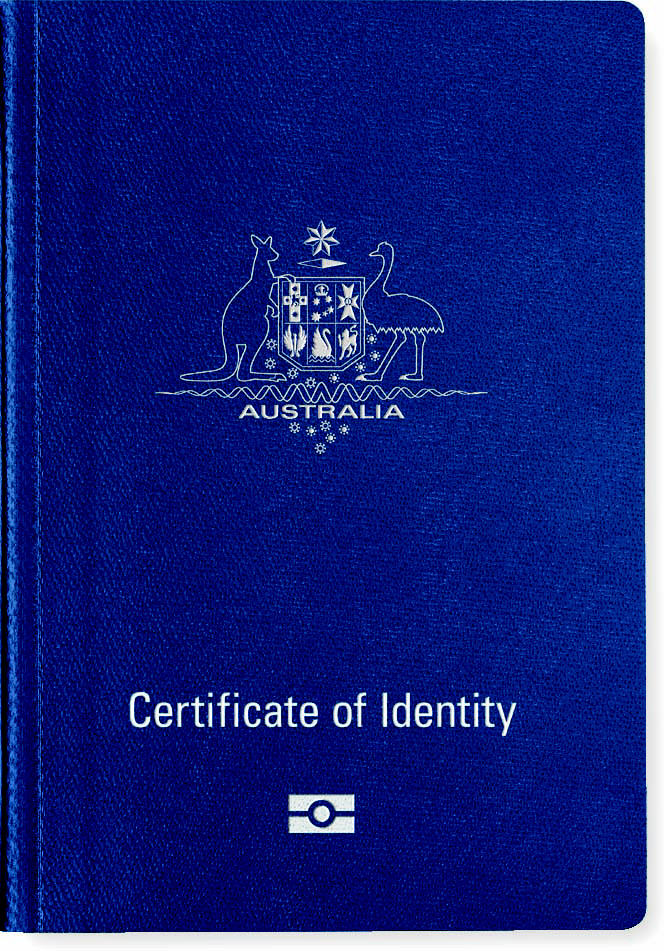
Australian "Certificate of identity" (travel document issued by the Australia government to certain non-citizens).

A non-citizen travel document, also known as a passport for foreign nationals, alien's passport, non-citizen's passport or passport for foreigners is a travel document issued by a country to non-citizens (also called aliens) residing within their borders who are stateless persons or otherwise unable to obtain a passport from their state of nationality (generally refugees).

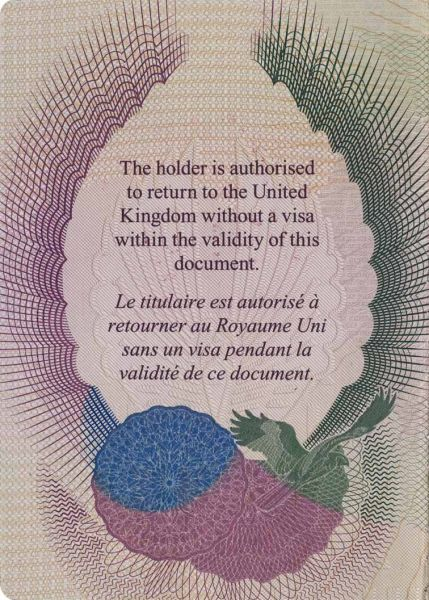
Inside front cover of a British Certificate of Travel.

Some countries issue two different types of non-citizen travel documents, one to refugees (known as 1951 Convention travel document) and another to stateless persons (known as 1954 Convention travel document).

Visa requirements for alien's passports / certificates of identity are in general different from those for regular passports.

Some states also issue certificates of identity to their own citizens as a form of emergency passport, or otherwise in lieu of a passport.

== Types ==
=== 1951 Convention documents (for refugees) ===
A certificate of identity issued to a refugee is also referred to as a 1951 Convention travel document (also known as a refugee travel document), in reference to the 1951 Convention Relating to the Status of Refugees. 145 countries are parties to the 1951 Convention and 146 countries are parties to the 1967 Protocol Relating to the Status of Refugees. Notably, the United States is not a party to the Convention, but provides travel documents to its lawful permanent residents, either as a U.S. Re-entry Permit or a refugee travel document under the 1967 Protocol.

=== 1954 Convention documents (for stateless persons) ===
A certificate of identity issued to a stateless person is also referred to as a 1954 Convention travel document, in reference to the 1954 Convention Relating to the Status of Stateless Persons. 89 countries are parties to the 1954 Convention.

Unlike a refugee travel document, a certificate of identity issued by most countries does not in itself entitle the holder to readmission into the country.

=== Non-Convention travel documents: Alien's passport, Certificate of Identity, Certificate of Travel, etc. ===
Other than Stateless person's travel documents and the Refugee travel documents, some countries issue travel documents for its foreign residents that are not based on any formal international Convention. These documents still meet ICAO standards for international identity documents. They are known variously as Alien's Passports or Passport for Foreigners in mainland Europe, including Scandinavia, and some other countries like Brazil, and were historically known as Certificate of Identity in the United Kingdom and other Commonwealth members, but are now called a Certificate of Travel in the UK.

Gallery of British travel document for non-citizens

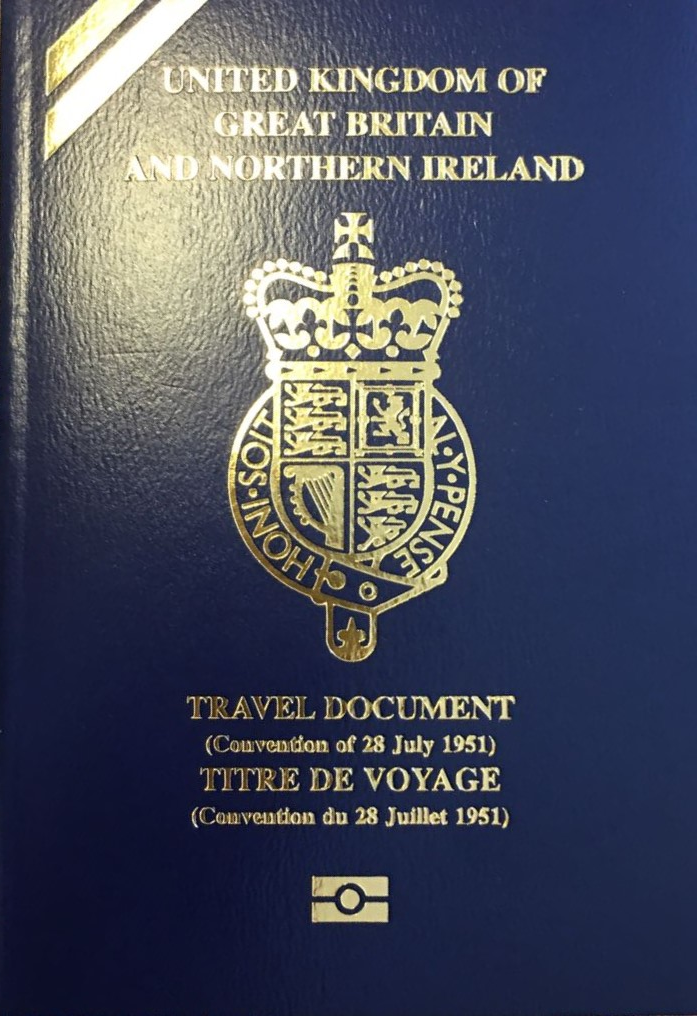
A British Refugee travel document

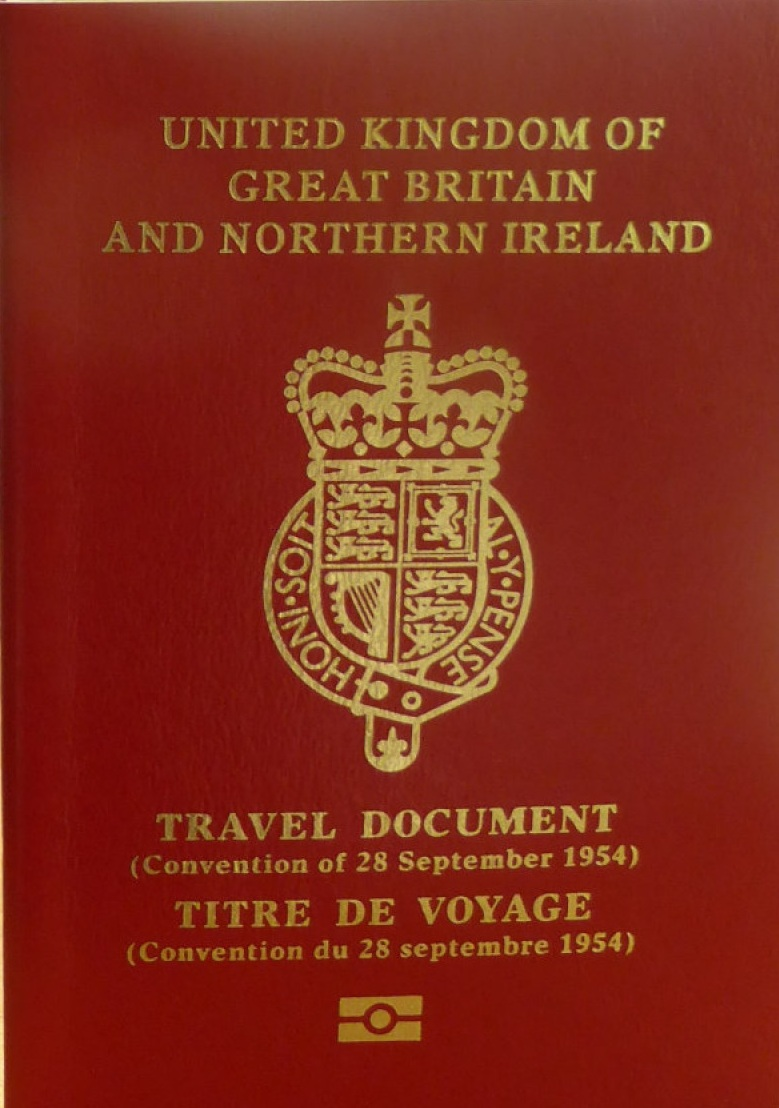
British Travel document for stateless persons (1954 Convention Travel Document)

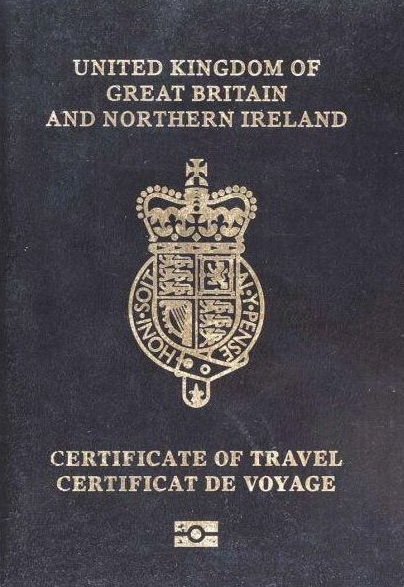
A British Certificate of Travel, issued to non-British residents of the United Kingdom who do not qualify for either the Refugee's travel document or the Stateless person's travel document.

== National examples ==
Certificates of identity are issued under various names, including:

- Australia – Australian Certificate of Identity
- Brunei – Bruneian International Certificate of Identity
- Canada – Canadian Certificate of Identity
- Estonia – Estonian alien's passport
- Finland – Finnish Alien's Passport
- Hong Kong – Hong Kong Document of Identity for Visa Purposes
  - (British Hong Kong) before handover – Hong Kong Certificate of Identity
- India – Indian Identity Certificate
- Indonesia – Paspor Orang Asing
- Japan – Japan Re-entry Permit
- Latvia – Non-citizens Passport
- Macau – Macau Special Administrative Region Travel Permit
  - (Portuguese Macau) before handover – Passaporte para Estrangeiros ('Passport for foreigners')
- Malaysia – Malaysian Certificate of Identity
- New Zealand – New Zealand Certificate of Identity
- Singapore – Singapore Certificate of Identity
- United Kingdom – British Certificate of Travel
- United States – U.S. Re-entry Permit

== See also ==
- Refugee identity certificate
- Refugee travel document
- 1954 Convention travel document
- 1954 Convention Relating to the Status of Stateless Persons
- 1961 Convention on the Reduction of Statelessness
- Nansen passport
- Travel document
