= Identity certificate (disambiguation) =

Identity certificate may refer to:

== Information technology ==
- Public key certificate
- Decentralized identifiers
- Self-sovereign identity

== Identity documents ==
- Australian Certificate of Identity
- Bruneian International Certificate of Identity
- Canadian Certificate of Identity
- Hong Kong Document of Identity for Visa Purposes
  - Hong Kong Certificate of Identity, issued prior to 1997
- Indian Identity Certificate
- Malaysian Certificate of Identity
- New Zealand Certificate of Identity
- Singapore Certificate of Identity
