= Convention travel document =

A convention travel document may refer to either:

- a 1954 Convention Travel Document, issued under the 1954 Convention Relating to the Status of Stateless Persons, or
- a Refugee travel document, issued under the 1951 Convention Relating to the Status of Refugees.
