= Joel Slater =

Joel Laverne Slater (April 30, 1960 – March 26, 2008) was an American activist who renounced his U.S. citizenship in 1987 in Australia, voluntarily making himself stateless to protest U.S. foreign policy.

The Australian government soon afterward deported him back to the United States, and after six years of fruitless efforts aimed at finding another country to which he could be admitted as a refugee, Slater asked the State Department to reverse its earlier recognition of his renunciation, and had his U.S. citizenship restored.

== Renunciation of citizenship ==
In December 1987, Slater appeared before the U.S. consul in Perth, Australia and renounced his citizenship; the State Department confirmed his renunciation and issued him with a Certificate of Loss of Nationality. At the time, roughly 300 Americans renounced their citizenship each year, but typically as part of the process of obtaining citizenship elsewhere. Slater had plans to marry an Australian woman and eventually obtain Australian citizenship through her, but that fell through, leaving him stateless. Slater's only travel document was a World Passport issued by Garry Davis' World Service Authority. He stated that he renounced his citizenship in protest of the foreign policy of the Ronald Reagan administration, in particular the 1986 bombing of Libya. He was quoted as saying, "I'm sick and tired of the United States. It's like belonging to a country club where you don't like the way the directors are behaving, and you cancel your membership."

== Travels as a refugee ==
Australia deported Slater after his United States passport was revoked; he was readmitted to the U.S. on a humanitarian parole, which he stated that he did not want. Slater then made various attempts to find another country which would admit him for settlement, going back and forth into Mexico and at one point even hitchhiking across Canada to Newfoundland and then taking a ferry to the nearby French overseas territory of Saint Pierre and Miquelon in an effort to gain admission there. He chose a French territory as a destination because France was a signatory to the Convention Relating to the Status of Stateless Persons. However, the territorial prefect at the time would not permit him to remain. His Canadian lawyer Gary Botting was quoted as stating that there was a "mini riot ... [s]everal fishermen went on a rampage".

== Return to the United States ==
Slater returned to the United States, but his earlier work authorization had expired due to his departure, and his Social Security Number was no longer valid. By March 1991, after his return to the U.S. he was living in an abandoned building near the railroad tracks in Tucson, Arizona. He expressed interest in going to Norway, but the government there stated that he could not be admitted without a job. The U.S. also refused to issue him a refugee travel document.

Slater referred to his situation as "exile". In 1991, the U.S. Department of State stated that Slater could request his citizenship back, but Slater stated that he was not interested.

Despite his migration difficulties, in a 1992 interview he stated that he had no regrets, comparing his actions to those taken by Sons of Liberty in the Boston Tea Party.

By late 1992, he was quoted by the Santa Barbara News-Press as stating that he hoped Bill Clinton could restore his U.S. citizenship by executive order. He regained U.S. citizenship in 1993.

== Family and personal life ==
Slater was born in Waterloo, Iowa to Jerry L. Slater and Shirley M. Rodery Slater. He had a sister Debra Slater, a younger brother Jerry L. Slater Jr., and another brother who died as an infant.

Slater's mother later married Robert G. Papach, also of Waterloo, with whom she had a son James, Slater's half brother; she died in 1999. Slater's brother Jerry lived in Moscow, Iowa; he died in 2006.

== Death ==
Slater died at his home in Pocatello, Idaho on March 26, 2008, where his body was found five days later. Trent, Nancy, and Christine, as well as his father Jerry, sister Debra, and half-brother James, were his surviving children.
