= Nansen International Office for Refugees =

League of Nations organization, 1930–1939

- Office International Nansen pour les Réfugiés
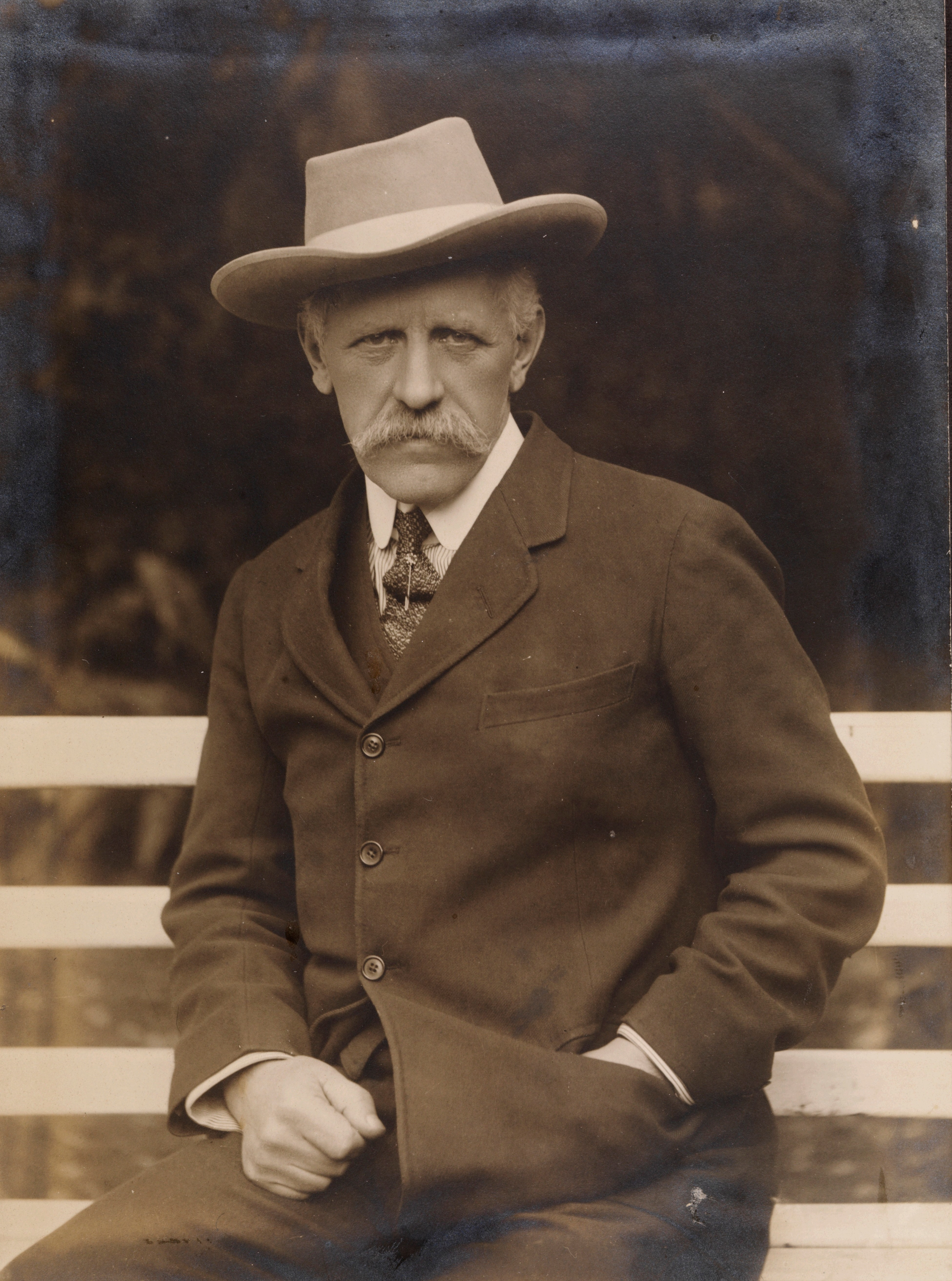
- Fridtjof Nansen as the League of Nations' high commissioner for prisoners of war and refugees, during a stay in Sofia, where he discussed problems regarding the exchange of prisoners of war and refugees.
- Formation: 1930; 96 years ago
- Founder: League of Nations
- Dissolved: 1939; 87 years ago
- Type: Organization
- Purpose: In charge of refugees from war areas

The Nansen International Office for Refugees (French: Office International Nansen pour les Réfugiés) was an organization established in 1930 by the League of Nations and named after Fridtjof Nansen, soon after his death, which was internationally in charge of refugees from war areas between 1930 and 1939. It is noted for developing the Nansen passport which allowed stateless people to travel between countries. It received the Nobel Peace Prize in 1938.

== History ==
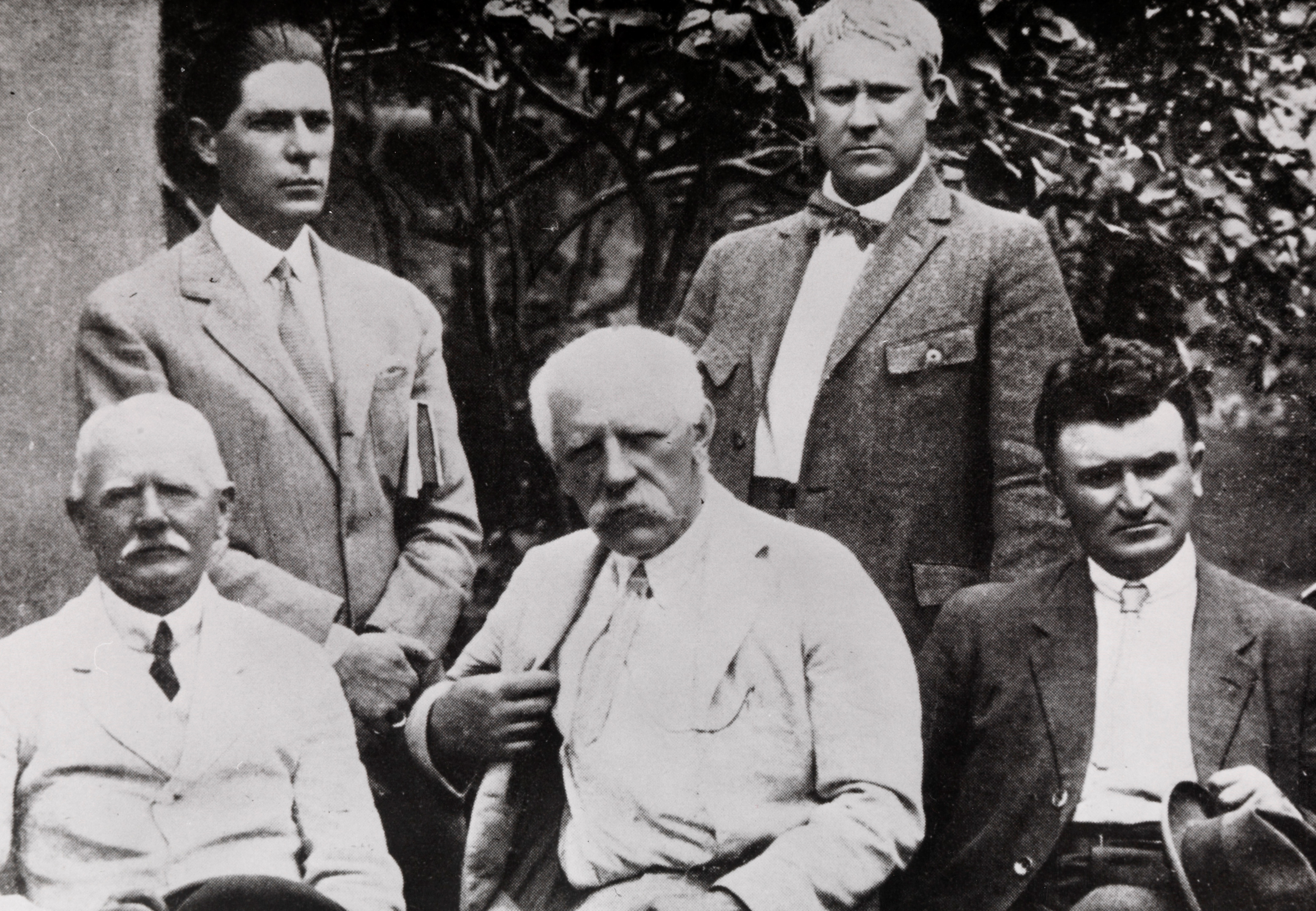
The Armenia commission of the League of Nations. From left, on the first row are Georges Carle, Fridtjof Nansen and C.E. Dupuis. In the background are Pio Le Savio (left) and Vidkun Quisling (right).

The Office International Nansen pour les Réfugiés was established in 1930 by the League of Nations, shortly after the death of its name patron Fridtjof Nansen to continue his successful work in international aid for refugee. It thus continued the organization in Geneva, Switzerland, founded by Nansen in 1921. The League also provided the administrative expenses for the Nansen Office though only for fees charged for the Nansen passport since its revenues for welfare and relief were obtained from private contributions.

The organization was to supply material and political support to refugees. For refugees from the Third Reich or from the civil war-torn Spain, the Nansen aid was not applicable, though many countries refused to accept the refugees.

In spite of such problems, the Nobel Peace Prize was awarded to the organization in 1938 for its work, but due to its dissolution shortly afterwards, the prize money was received by a newly founded refugee organization of the League of Nations. The office was dissolved at the same time as the League dissolved the High Commission (established in 1933) because of the problems surrounding German refugees after the dissolution of the Third Reich.

In 1938, this Office was replaced by the appointment of a High Commissioner for Refugees, a precursor to the United Nations High Commissioner for Refugees.

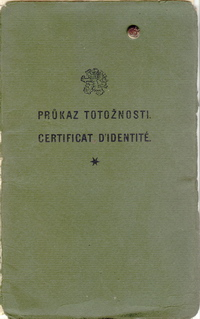
Nansen passport cover,
Police office, Prague, 1930

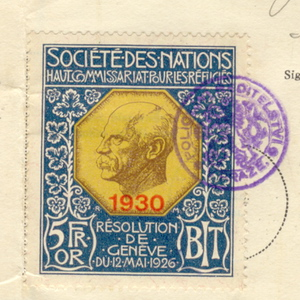
A stamp in a Nansen passport,
Nansen International Office for Refugees

== Accomplishments ==
The Nansen International Office for Refugees was responsible for the adoption of the 1933 Refugee Convention, which was a modest charter of human rights, by fourteen countries. The Nansen Office was instrumental in finding shelter in specially constructed houses in villages in Syria and Lebanon for 40,000 Armenians, after the resettlement of another 10,000 in Yerevan. The Office also successfully resettled Saar refugees in Paraguay after its reintegration into Germany in 1935.

== Nobel Peace Prize ==
The Nansen International Office for Refugees was awarded the 1938 Nobel Peace Prize for its efforts to establish the Nansen passports.

== See also ==
- International Refugee Organization
- United Nations High Commissioner for Refugees

== Bibliography ==
- Adams, Walter, Extent and Nature of the World Refugee Problem, The Annals of the American Academy of Political and Social Science, 203 (May 1939) 26-36.
- Convention Relating to the Status of Refugees. Paris, Nansen Office for Refugees, 1938.
- Hansson, Michael, The Refugee Problem and the League of Nations. Conference held at the Norwegian Nobel Institute, Oslo, January 7, 1938. Geneva, 1938.
- Macartney, Carlile A., Refugees: The Work of the League. London, 1930.
- Nansen, Fridtjof, Armenian Refugees, League of Nations Document C. 237. 1924.
- Nansen, Fridtjof, Russian Refugees: General Report on the Work Accomplished up to March 15, 1922, League of Nations Document C. 124. M. 74. 1922.
- Nansen International Office for Refugees. Report by the Governing Body to the Twelfth Assembly of League of Nations [A.27. 1931.] See also Report by M. Michael Hansson, Former President of the Governing Body of the Nansen International Office for Refugees, on the Activities of the Office from July 1 to December 31, 1938. [A. 19. 1939. xii] (1939. xii. B.2).
- Simpson, Sir John Hope, The Refugee Problem: Report of a Survey. London, 1939.
- Statutes of Nansen International Office for Refugees as Approved by the Council on January 19th, 1931, League of Nations, Official Journal, February 1931, pp. 309–311.
