= Bruneian International Certificate of Identity =

Travel document

- Type: Travel document
- Issued by: Brunei
- Purpose: International travel document
- Eligibility: Bruneian permanent residents who are stateless
- Expiration: 5 years

The Bruneian International Certificate of Identity (ICI) is an international travel document issued by the Immigration and National Registration Department to Bruneian permanent residents who are stateless. It is valid for five years.

== Eligibility ==
The applicant for an ICI must possess either a residence permit or an entry permit, and be stateless.

== Use ==
Holders of the International Certificate of Identity are not subject to the visa exemptions that holders of the Bruneian passport are. ICI holders can enter Germany, Hungary and Slovenia visa-free for a maximum of 90 days within a 180-day period. In the case of Germany, in theory, in order to benefit from the visa exemption, the ICI must be issued under the terms of the 1954 Convention Relating to the Status of Stateless Persons and contain an authorisation to return to Brunei which has a sufficiently long period of validity. But because Brunei is not a signatory to the 1954 Convention Relating to the Status of Stateless Persons, in practice holders of an ICI do not qualify for the visa exemption to Germany. However, holders of an ICI can still benefit from the visa exemption to Hungary and Slovenia since the Hungarian and Slovenian Governments do not require the ICI to be issued under the terms of the 1954 Convention Relating to the Status of Stateless Persons.

Holders of Bruneian International Certificate of Identity can enter Taiwan for 14 days.

Furthermore, Spain, Belgium, Italy, the Netherlands and Croatia do not recognise the Brunei International Certificate of Identity and thus the travel document is not valid for travel to these countries. The Brunei International Certificate of Identity is not covered by the Geneva or New York conventions.
