= Re-entry permit =

A re-entry permit is issued by some countries to permanent residents and other residence permit holders to maintain their residency status while travelling abroad, and to return as residents.

For example, the United States issues a re-entry permit to a resident alien who plans to travel abroad for an extended period of time (up to two years) while maintaining their permanent residency.

== See also ==
- Hong Kong Re-entry Permit
- Japan Re-entry Permit
- U.S. Re-entry Permit
