= Convention on the Reduction of Statelessness =

1961 United Nations multilateral treaty

- states parties states that have signed, but not ratified states that have not signed
- Signed: 30 August 1961
- Location: New York City
- Effective: 13 December 1975
- Condition: 6 ratifications
- Signatories: 3: Dominican Republic; France; Israel
- Parties: 82: Albania; Angola; Argentina; Armenia; Australia; Austria; Azerbaijan; Belgium; Belize; Benin; Bolivia; Bosnia and Herzegovina; Brazil; Bulgaria; Burkina Faso; Canada; Chad; Chile; Colombia; Congo; Costa Rica; Côte d'Ivoire; Croatia; Czech Republic; Denmark; Ecuador; Eswatini; Finland; Gambia; Georgia; Germany; Guatemala; Guinea; Guinea-Bissau; Haiti; Honduras; Hungary; Iceland; Ireland; Italy; Jamaica; Kiribati; Latvia; Lesotho; Liberia; Libya; Liechtenstein; Lithuania; Luxembourg; Mali; Montenegro; Mozambique; Netherlands; New Zealand; Nicaragua; Niger; Nigeria; North Macedonia; Norway; Panama; Paraguay; Peru; Philippines; Portugal; Republic of Moldova; Romania; Rwanda; Sao Tome and Principe; Senegal; Serbia; Sierra Leone; Slovakia; Slovenia; South Sudan; Spain; Sweden; Togo; Tunisia; Turkmenistan; Ukraine; United Kingdom; Uruguay
- Depositary: Secretary-General of the United Nations
- Languages: Chinese, English, French, Russian, and Spanish

The Convention on the Reduction of Statelessness is a 1961 United Nations multilateral treaty whereby sovereign states agree to reduce the incidence of statelessness. The convention was originally intended as a Protocol to the Convention Relating to the Status of Refugees, while the 1954 Convention Relating to the Status of Stateless Persons was adopted to cover stateless persons who are not refugees and therefore not within the scope of the Convention Relating to the Status of Refugees.

== Statelessness prior to World War II ==
One case of statelessness was identified in the Protocol relating to a Certain Case of Statelessness at the League of Nations Codification Conference, 1930 in The Hague: "In a State whose nationality is not conferred by the mere fact of birth in its territory, a person born in its territory of a mother possessing the nationality of that State and of a father without nationality or of unknown nationality shall have the nationality of the said State." Over time, many signatories have adjusted their laws to ensure this rule remains true. (For example, in Australian nationality law, a child born in the country acquires citizenship if any parent is a citizen). However, despite this, many cases remained ambiguous or uncovered primarily due to the fact that a person did not always receive the nationality of its parents, or was born in a certain place and not always provided citizenship of that state.

The Nansen International Office For Refugees, an organization of the League of Nations, was internationally in charge of refugees from war areas from 1930 to 1939. It received the Nobel Peace Prize in 1938. Their Nansen passports, designed in 1922 by founder Fridtjof Nansen, were internationally recognized identity cards first issued by the League of Nations to stateless refugees. In 1942 they were honored by governments in 52 countries and were the first refugee travel documents.

== Background to UN action addressing the problem of statelessness ==
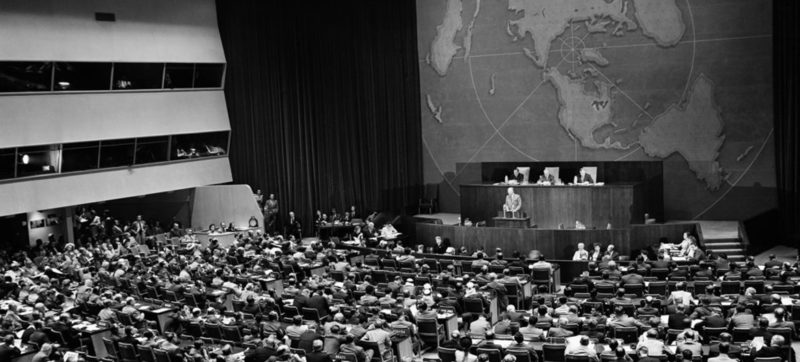
The Room of the United Nations General Assembly where Resolution was passed in 1949 which inspired the adoption of the Convention Regarding the Status of Stateless Persons in 1954 and the completion of the 1961 Convention on the Reduction of Statelessness

Migrations due to political instability during World War II and its immediate aftermath highlighted the international dimensions of problems presented by unprecedented volumes of displaced persons including those rendered effectively stateless.

Dating from December 1948, the Universal Declaration of Human Rights at Article 15 affirms that:

- Everyone has the right to a nationality.
- No one shall be arbitrarily deprived of his nationality nor denied the right to change his nationality.

At the Fourth United Nations General Assembly Session in October–December 1949, the International Law Commission included the topic "Nationality, including statelessness" in its list of topics of international law provisionally selected for codification. At the behest of the United Nations Economic and Social Council (ECOSOC) in its 11th Session soon after, that item was given priority.

The Convention Relating to the Status of Refugees was done on 28 July 1951. It was originally desired to cover 'refugees and stateless persons'; however, agreement was not reached with respect to the latter.

The International Law Commission at its fifth session in 1953 produced both a Draft Convention on the Elimination of Future Statelessness, and a Draft Convention on the Reduction of Future Statelessness. ECOSOC approved both drafts.

The 1954 Convention Relating to the Status of Stateless Persons was done in September 1954 (The Status Convention). This completed the unfinished work of the Refugee Convention three years prior.

On 4 December 1954 the UN General Assembly by Resolution adopted both drafts as the basis of its desire for a conference of plenipotentiaries and an eventual Convention.

== How the convention works to reduce statelessness ==
In respect of contracting states:

- "Stateless birth" on their territory attracts the grant of their nationality (article 1).
- Otherwise stateless persons may take the nationality of the place of their birth or of the place where they were found (in the case of a foundling), otherwise they may take the nationality of one of their parents (in each case possibly subject to a qualifying period of residence in that State) (article 2).
- A stateless person has some time beyond attaining adulthood to seek to claim the benefit of the convention. That time is always at least three years from the age of eighteen (article 1(5)).
- Transfer of territory between states must occur in a manner that avoids the occurrence of statelessness for persons residing in the territory transferred. When a State acquires territory, the inhabitants of that territory presumptively acquire the nationality of that State (article 10).
- Persons otherwise stateless shall be able to take the nationality of one of their parents (possibly subject to a period of prior residence not more than three years) (article 4).
- Absent circumstances of fraudulent application or disloyalty toward the contracting state, deprivations and renunciations of citizenship shall only take effect where a person has or subsequently obtains another nationality in replacement (article 8).
- The United Nations High Commissioner for Refugees (UNHCR) will issue travel documents evidencing nationality to persons, otherwise stateless, having a claim of nationality under the convention.
- Birth on a sea vessel or aircraft may attract the nationality of the flag of that vessel or craft (article 3).
- Disloyal or certain criminal conduct may limit an individual's ability to avail the benefit of the convention (article 8).
- The benefit of the Convention may be claimed by guardians on behalf of children (article 1(1)).
- States may impose a period of residence qualification for granting nationality to persons who may be otherwise stateless. That period is a maximum five years immediately prior to application and maximum of ten years overall (article 1(2)).

== Substantive provisions of the convention ==
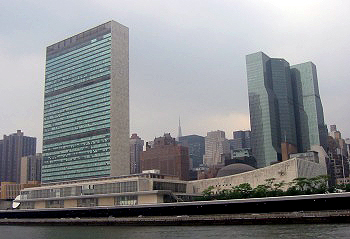
United Nations Headquarters, New York. Site of the completion of the Statelessness Reduction Convention in 1961

There are 21 Articles, summarised below:

Article 1(1)
Contracting States shall grant their nationality to persons, otherwise stateless, born in their territory (subject to Article 1(2)).
The grant may be by virtue of the birth, or upon application by or on behalf of the person so born.
Article 1(2)
An applicant may have up until at least the age of 21 to claim their citizenship by birth from article 1(1).
For grant of citizenship by birth, a Contracting State may require proof of habitual residence in their territory for a period not exceeding 5 years immediately prior to application, or 10 years in total.
Grant of citizenship by birth may be contingent upon the applicant's not having been convicted of an offence against national security nor having been sentenced to imprisonment for a term of five years or more. Grant of citizenship by birth may be contingent upon the applicant having always been stateless.
Article 1(3)
A child born in wedlock in a Contracting State, whose mother is a national of that State, and who would otherwise be stateless, shall take the nationality of that State.
Article 1(4)
A Contracting State shall give its nationality to a person, otherwise stateless, who is legally precluded from assuming his/her birth nationality, where that State's nationality was held by either parent at the time of the birth.
Article 1(5)
An applicant has until at least the age of 23 to claim a nationality by Article 1(4).
For conferral of nationality by Article 1(4) a contracting State may impose a residence requirement not exceeding three years immediately prior to application.
For conferral of nationality by Article 1(4) it may be required that the applicant has always been stateless.
Article 2
For the purpose of assigning nationality, a foundling shall be considered to have been born in the State where it was found and from parents of that State's nationality. That presumption may be displaced by proof to the contrary.
Article 3
For the purpose of determining the obligations of contracting states under this convention, birth on a ship or aircraft shall amount to birth in the territory of the State that gives its flag to that ship or aircraft.
Article 4
A Contracting State shall grant its nationality to a person, not born in its territory, if either parent had that State's nationality and the person would be otherwise stateless.
A person may make such a claim for nationality at least up until the age of 23. They may also be required to have a period of residence up to three years immediately prior to application. The claim may be refused where a person has been convicted of an offence against the national security of the State.
Article 5
If a law entails loss of nationality, such loss shall be conditional upon the person acquiring another nationality. This only applies to loss by marriage, legitimation, divorce, recognition or adoption. A child that loses nationality by recognition or affiliation shall be given opportunity to reacquire by written application under terms not more rigorous than provided by Article 1(2).
Article 6
If a law entails loss of nationality by a spouse or child by virtue of the loss of nationality by the other spouse or a parent, such loss shall be conditional on the person's possession or acquisition of another nationality.
Article 7
Laws for the renunciation of a nationality shall be conditional upon a person's acquisition or possession of another nationality. (Exceptions: not to frustrate freedom of movement of nationals within a country, not to frustrate return of nationals to their country, not to frustrate a person's ability to seek asylum)
Article 8
Contracting States shall not deprive people of their nationality so as to render them stateless. (Exceptions: where otherwise provided in the Convention; where nationality has been acquired by misrepresentation or fraud; disloyalty to the Contracting State).
Article 9
Nationality will not be deprived on racial, ethnic, political or religious grounds.
Article 10
Treaties providing for transfer of territory between States shall make provisions to preclude the occurrence of statelessness. Absent such provisions, a Contracting State taking territory will give its nationality to persons, otherwise stateless, in that territory.
Article 11
Persons may apply to the UNHCR to claim the benefit of the Convention.
Article 12
The Convention applies to persons born either before or after it goes into force. (Exception: only applies to foundlings found after going into force)
Article 13
The Convention is not to be construed to detract from any law or treaty provision otherwise aiding the reduction of statelessness.
Article 14
Disputes by Contracting States concerning the Convention are susceptible to final adjudication by the International Court of Justice.
Article 15
The Convention applies to all trust, non-self-governing, colonial, and non-metropolitan territories of Contracting States.
Articles 16–21
Process of signature and ratification.

== Contracting states ==
As of January 2025, 82 states had ratified or acceded to the convention. In comparison, 146 countries had ratified the Convention Relating to the Status of Refugees by 2026.

== See also ==
- 1954 Convention Relating to the Status of Stateless Persons
- Bidun
- Naturalization
- Nansen International Office for Refugees
- Nationality
- Refugee and Refugee law
- Statelessness
- European Convention on Nationality
