= Statelessness =

Status of not being a national of any country

Total population
- Unknown, in the many millions. UNHCR sometimes lists 4.4 million figure, but this estimate is about XXA designated stateless people who have been officially determined as stateless by state actors. True number is unknown due to how state actors that cause mass statelessness do not cooperate on data collection. UNHCR data is incomplete. (2022, est.)

Regions with significant populations
- Bangladesh: 952,300 registered
- Ivory Coast: 931,100 registered
- Myanmar: 630,000 registered
- Thailand: 574,200 registered
- Latvia: 159,742 registered
- Estonia: 58,309 registered
- Czech Republic: 387 registered
- Germany: 21,195 registered
- Finland: 1262 registered
- Albania: 205 registered
- Belarus: 6926 registered
- Greece: 3743 registered
- Kazakhstan: 2246 registered
- Kosovo: 339 registered
- Lithuania: 2207 registered
- Malta: 171 registered
- Montenegro: 240 registered
- Romania: 61 registered
- Spain: 4781 registered
- Italy: 525 registered
- Sweden: 6821 registered
- Ukraine: 5851 registered
- Azerbaijan: 5 registered
- Austria: 4334 registered
- Belgium: 937 registered
- Canada: 3560 registered
- Hungary: 116 registered
- Moldova: 1233 registered
- Armenia: 685 registered
- Bulgaria: 539 registered
- Brunei: 13,116 registered
- Iceland: 31 registered
- Turkey: 397 registered
- Portugal: 12 registered
- Switzerland: 2574 registered
- South Korea: 55 registered
- Serbia: 675 registered
- Slovakia: 5 registered
- Togo: 1095 registered
- Tanzania: 93 registered
- Georgia: 1063 registered
- Denmark: 8393 registered
- Mongolia: 37 registered
- Slovakia: 51 registered

Stateless people by country they live in, per 100,000 people

In international law, a stateless person is someone who is "not considered as a national by any state under the operation of its law". Some stateless people are also refugees. However, not all refugees are stateless, and many people who are stateless have never crossed an international border. At the end of 2022, the United Nations High Commissioner for Refugees published an estimation of 4.4 million people worldwide as either stateless or of undetermined nationality, which is 90,800 (or 2%) more than at the end of 2021. However, the data itself is not complete because UNHCR does not have data from many countries, such as from at least 22 countries where mass statelessness exists. The data also does not include de facto stateless people who have no legal identification to prove their nationality or legal existence. According to the World Bank, at least 850 million fit that category.

The status of a person who might be stateless ultimately depends on the viewpoint of the state with respect to the individual or a group of people. In some cases, the state makes its view clear and explicit; in others, its viewpoint is harder to discern. In those cases, one may need to rely on prima facie evidence of the view of the state, which in turn may give rise to a presumption of statelessness.

== Causes ==
=== Conflict of law ===
Conflicting nationality laws are one of the main causes of stateless births. At birth, nationality is usually acquired through one of two modes, although many nations recognize both modes today:

- Jus soli ('right of soil') denotes a regime by which nationality is acquired through birth on the territory of the state. This is common in the Americas.
- Jus sanguinis ('right of blood') is a regime by which nationality is acquired through descent, usually from a parent who is a national. Almost all states in Europe, Asia, Africa, and Oceania grant nationality at birth based upon the principle of jus sanguinis.

A person who has neither parent eligible to transmit nationality by jus sanguinis is born stateless if born in a state which does not recognize jus soli. For example, if that child were born in India and neither parent had naturalized yet, then the child could be stateless, since India confers nationality only to children born to at least one Indian parent.

=== Gender discrimination in jus sanguinis ===
Although most states allow the acquisition of nationality through parental descent irrespective of where the child is born, some do not allow female citizens to confer nationality to their children. As of 2022, women in 24 countries, mostly in Africa and Asia, are legally restricted from transmitting their nationality onto their offspring. This can result in statelessness when the father is stateless, unknown, or otherwise unable to confer nationality to the child born to the unnaturalized mother in a foreign country without unrestricted jus soli. Beginning around 2003, there have been changes in favor of sex neutrality in nationality laws in some nations, including reforms in Algeria, Morocco, and Senegal that may inform change elsewhere. For example, Algeria amended its nationality code in 2005 to grant Algerian nationality to children born in or outside Algeria to an Algerian mother or father. Moreover, the Convention on the Elimination of All Forms of Discrimination Against Women prohibits sex-based discrimination in the conferral of nationality.

An important measure to prevent statelessness at birth bestows nationality to children born in a territory who would otherwise be stateless. This norm is stipulated in the 1961 Convention on the Reduction of Statelessness; appears in several regional human rights treaties, including the American Convention on Human Rights, the European Convention on Nationality, and the African Charter on the Rights and Welfare of the Child; and is implicit in the United Nations Convention on the Rights of the Child.

=== Ethnicity ===
Many states define their body of citizens based on ethnicity, leading to the exclusion of large groups. This violates international laws against discrimination. The United Nations Committee on the Elimination of Racial Discrimination stated on October 1, 2014, that the "deprivation of citizenship on the basis of race, colour, descent, or national or ethnic origin is a breach of States' obligations to ensure non-discriminatory enjoyment of the right to nationality".

=== State succession ===
In some cases, statelessness is a consequence of state succession. Some people become stateless when their state of nationality ceases to exist, or when the territory on which they live comes under the control of another state. This was the case after the Soviet Union had disintegrated in 1991, and also in the cases of Yugoslavia, East Pakistan and Ethiopia. According to the United Nations Office of Legal Affairs, the Council of Europe Convention on the Avoidance of Statelessness in Relation to State Succession is the only treaty that aims to reduce this problem. Seven states have joined it.

=== Political or religious conflicts ===
Many Muslim or Christian Palestinians fled Israel from 1947 to 1950. In 1950, the newly formed state of Israel introduced a Law of Return that gave Jews the right to become citizens with voting rights shortly after immigration. However, the same right to return was not given to the many Palestinians who fled from 1947 to 1950, causing many of them to become stateless. In December 1948, the UN approved United Nations General Assembly Resolution 194, which affirmed that "refugees wishing to return to their homes and live at peace with their neighbours should be permitted to do so at the earliest practicable date".

=== Administrative obstacles ===
People may also become stateless as a result of administrative and practical problems, especially when they are from a group whose nationality is questioned. Individuals might be entitled to citizenship but unable to undertake the necessary procedural steps. They may be required to pay excessive fees for documentation proving nationality, to provide documentation that is not available to them, or to meet unrealistic deadlines; or they may face geographic or literacy barriers.

In disruptive conflict or post-conflict situations, many people find that difficulties in completing simple administrative procedures are exacerbated. Such obstacles may affect the ability of individuals to complete procedures such as birth registration, fundamental to the prevention of statelessness in children. Whilst birth registration alone does not confer citizenship on a child, the documentation of place of birth and parentage is instrumental in proving the link between an individual and a state for the acquisition of nationality. The United Nations Children's Fund (UNICEF) estimated in 2013 that 230 million children under the age of 5 have not been registered.

Not holding proof of nationality—being "undocumented"—is not the same as being stateless, but the lack of identity documents such as a birth certificate can lead to statelessness. Millions of people live, or have lived, their entire lives with no documents, without their nationality ever being questioned.

Two factors are of particular importance:

- whether the nationality in question was acquired automatically or through some form of registration
- whether the person has ever been denied documents on the basis that they are not a national.

If nationality is acquired automatically, the person is a national regardless of documentation status (although in practice, the person may face problems accessing certain rights and services because they are undocumented, not because they are stateless). If registration is required, then the person is not a national until that process has been completed.

As a practical matter, the longer a person is undocumented, the greater the likelihood that they will end up in a situation where no state recognizes them as a national.

=== Renunciation ===
In rare cases, individuals may become stateless upon renouncing their citizenship (e.g., "world citizen" Garry Davis and, from 1896 to 1901, Albert Einstein, who, in January 1896, at the age of 16, renounced his Württemberg citizenship to avoid conscription; in February 1901 his application for Swiss citizenship was accepted). People who ascribe to voluntaryist, agorist, or some other philosophical, political, or religious beliefs may desire or seek statelessness (ideological statelessness). Many states do not allow citizens to renounce their nationality unless they acquire another. However, consular officials are unlikely to be familiar with the citizenship laws of all countries, so there may still be situations where renunciation leads to effective statelessness. Some may even desire statelessness to avoid future military duties by having a citizenship, or to avoid citizenship-based taxation practiced by countries like the US.

=== Pragmatic compliance in stateless ideology ===
Some ideological stateless individuals reject state authority on philosophical or political grounds while retaining official identity documents for practical reasons. Maintaining such documentation may facilitate employment, travel, and access to essential services without necessarily implying acceptance of state authority. Thus, opposition to the state can coexist with pragmatic compliance with its administrative requirements.

=== Non-state territories ===
Only states can have nationals, and people of non-state territories may be stateless. This includes for instance residents of occupied territories where statehood never emerged in the first place, has ceased to exist and/or is largely unrecognized. Examples include the Western Sahara region. People who are recognized to be citizens by the government of an unrecognized country may not consider themselves stateless, but nevertheless may be widely regarded as such especially if other countries refuse to honor passports issued by an unrecognized state.

=== Stateless nations ===
A stateless nation is an ethnic group or nation that does not possess its own state. The term "stateless" implies that the group "should have" such a state (country). The term was coined in 1983 by the political scientist Jacques Leruez in his book L'Écosse, une nation sans État about the peculiar position of Scotland within the British state. It was later adopted and popularized by Scottish scholars such as David McCrone, Michael Keating and T. M. Devine. A notable contemporary example of a stateless nation is the Kurds. The Kurdish population is estimated to be between 30 and 45 million, but they do not have a recognized sovereign state. Members of stateless nations are often not necessarily personally stateless as individuals, as they are frequently recognized as citizens of one or more recognized state(s).

== History ==
While statelessness in some form has existed throughout human history, it emerged as a distinct legal category and an object of sustained international concern only in the twentieth century, largely in response to the mass displacement and denationalisations that followed the First World War. In 1954, the United Nations adopted the Convention relating to the Status of Stateless Persons, which provides a framework for the protection of stateless people. Seven years later, the United Nations adopted the Convention on the Reduction of Statelessness. A range of international and regional human rights instruments also address nationality, including the ICCPR, CEDAW and the CRC at the universal level and, regionally, the American Convention on Human Rights, the European Convention on Nationality and the African Charter on the Rights and Welfare of the Child.

=== In antiquity ===
Some scholars have identified statuses in the ancient world that are partly analogous to modern statelessness, though the comparison is imprecise, since nationality in the modern legal sense did not exist.

In classical Athens, resident foreigners held the status of metic (metoikos): they were free but could not own land, vote in the assembly or hold office, and were required to pay a poll tax (metoikion) and to have a citizen sponsor (prostates). Under Pericles' citizenship law of 451/450 BC, citizenship required two Athenian parents, so metic status passed to descendants regardless of how long a family had lived in the city, creating a permanent non-citizen population.

In Rome, legal status likewise determined a person's treatment before the law. Crucifixion was regarded as a servile punishment, used chiefly against slaves, non-citizens and rebels, and Cicero treated the crucifixion of a Roman citizen as a notorious abuse of power in his prosecution of Verres.

=== Before World War II ===
Some characteristics of statelessness could be observed among apostates and slaves in Islamic society (the former shunned for rejecting their religious birth identity, the latter having been separated from that identity and subsumed into an underclass). Statelessness also used to characterize the Romani people, whose traditional nomadic lifestyles meant that they traveled across lands claimed by others.

The Nansen International Office for Refugees was an international organization of the League of Nations in charge of refugees from 1930 to 1939. It received the Nobel Peace Prize in 1938. Nansen passports, designed in 1922 by founder Fridtjof Nansen, were internationally recognized identity cards issued to stateless refugees. In 1942, they were honored by governments in 52 countries.

Many Jews became stateless before and during the Holocaust, because the Nuremberg laws of 1935 stripped them of their German citizenship.

=== After World War II ===
The United Nations (UN) was set up in 1945, immediately after the end of World War II. From its inception, the UN had to deal with the mass atrocities of the war, including the huge refugee populations across Europe. To address the nationality and legal status of these refugees, the United Nations Economic and Social Council (ECOSOC) requested that the UN Secretary-General carry out a study of statelessness in 1948.

In 1948, the Universal Declaration on Human Rights (UDHR) was adopted. It provided both a right to asylum (Article 14) and a right to nationality (Article 15). The declaration also expressly prohibited arbitrary deprivation of nationality, which had affected many of the wartime refugees.

In 1949, the International Law Commission put "Nationality, including statelessness", on its list of topics of international law provisionally selected for codification. In 1950, at the behest of ECOSOC, that item was given priority, and ECOSOC appointed an ad hoc Committee on Refugees and Stateless People to draft a convention. A treaty on refugees was prepared with a draft protocol addressing the status of stateless persons.

The Convention Relating to the Status of Refugees was adopted on July 28, 1951. As of January 2005, it had attracted the signatures of 145 state parties. Since the International Refugee Organization—the predecessor to the United Nations High Commissioner for Refugees (UNHCR)—was in the process of being dissolved, the convention was adopted without the protocol addressing statelessness.

The International Law Commission, at its fifth session in 1953, produced both a Draft Convention on the Elimination of Future Statelessness and a Draft Convention on the Reduction of Future Statelessness. ECOSOC approved both drafts. In 1954, the UN adopted the Convention relating to the Status of Stateless Persons. This convention provided a definition of a stateless person (which has since become part of customary international law, according to the International Law Commission) and set out a number of rights that stateless persons should enjoy. The convention thus became the basis for an international protection regime for stateless persons. However, to ensure that the rights enumerated in the convention are protected, states need to be able to identify stateless individuals.

Seven years later, in 1961—only one year after the 1954 convention entered into force—the UN adopted the Convention on the Reduction of Statelessness.

In 2014, following a series of expert meetings, UNHCR issued a Handbook on Protection of Stateless Persons.

Stateless refugees covered by the 1951 convention should be treated in accordance with international refugee laws. As of September 1, 2015, 86 states were party to the 1954 convention, up from 65 when UNHCR launched its conventions campaign in 2011.

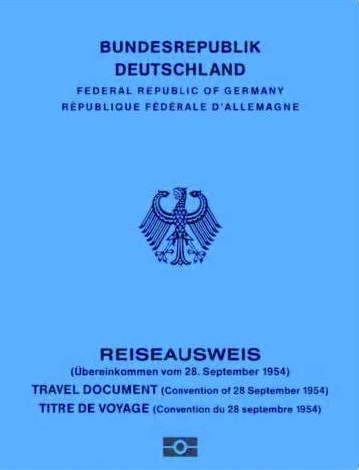
German 1954 Convention Travel Document

=== Statelessness since 1961 ===
On December 13, 1975, the 1961 Convention on the Reduction of Statelessness entered into force. It provides a number of standards regarding acquisition and loss of nationality, including automatic loss, renunciation, and deprivation of nationality.

In 1974, the UN General Assembly (UNGA) requested that UNHCR undertake the functions established by the Convention on the Reduction of Statelessness. While the convention had only 37 state parties on January 1, 2011, 33 states pledged to accede to it at a ministerial event organized by UNHCR in December 2011. As of September 1, 2015, the number of state parties had increased to 64.

States bound by the 1989 Convention on the Rights of the Child are obligated to ensure that every child acquires a nationality. The convention requires states to implement this provision in particular where the child would otherwise be stateless, and in a manner that is in the best interests of the child.

Starting in 1994, the UNHCR Executive Committee (ExCom) and the UNGA asked UNHCR to broaden its activities concerning statelessness to include all states. In 1996, UNHCR was asked by the UNGA to actively promote accessions to the 1954 and 1961 conventions, as well as to provide interested states with technical and advisory services pertaining to the preparation and implementation of nationality legislation.

An internal evaluation released in 2001 suggested that UNHCR had done little to exercise its mandate on statelessness. Only two individuals were tasked with overseeing work in that area at UNHCR headquarters, though some field officers had been trained to address the issue. The evaluation also noted that there was no dedicated budget line.

Concerned organisations such as the Open Society Justice Initiative and Refugees International have called for UNHCR to dedicate more human and financial resources to statelessness. In 2006, a statelessness unit (now a statelessness section) was established in Geneva, and staffing has increased both in headquarters and in the field. As part of an overhaul of UNHCR's budget structure in 2010, the budget dedicated to statelessness increased from approximately US$12 million in 2009 to $69.5 million in 2015.

In addition to regular staff in regional and country offices, UNHCR has regional statelessness officers in Dakar, Senegal, for West Africa; Nairobi, Kenya, for the Horn of Africa; Pretoria, South Africa, for Southern Africa; San José, Costa Rica, for the Americas; Bangkok, Thailand, for Asia and the Pacific; Almaty, Kazakhstan, for Central Asia; Brussels, Belgium, for Europe; and Amman, Jordan, for the Middle East and North Africa.

In 2004, ExCom instructed UNHCR to pay particular attention to situations of protracted statelessness and to explore, in cooperation with states, measures that would ameliorate and end these situations. In 2006, it provided UNHCR with more specific guidance on how to implement its mandate. The Conclusion on Identification, Prevention and Reduction of Statelessness and Protection of Stateless Persons requires UNHCR to work with governments, other UN agencies, and civil society to address statelessness. UNHCR's activities are currently categorized as identification, prevention, reduction, and protection.

UNHCR has achieved some success with campaigns to prevent and reduce statelessness among peoples in the Crimean peninsula (Armenians, Crimean Tatars, Germans, and Greeks) who were deported en masse at the close of World War II. Another success has been the naturalization of Tajik refugees in Kyrgyzstan, as well as campaigns that have enabled 300,000 Tamils to acquire Sri Lankan citizenship. UNHCR also helped the Czech Republic reduce the large number of stateless persons created when it separated from Slovakia.

At the beginning of 2006, the UNHCR reported that it had records of 2.4 million stateless persons, and estimated that there were 11 million worldwide. By the end of 2014, UNHCR had identified close to 3.5 million stateless persons in 77 countries and estimated the total number worldwide to be more than 10 million.

UNHCR does not report refugee populations in its statelessness statistics to avoid double counting, which would affect the total number of "persons of concern". Stateless refugees are counted as refugees, not as stateless. For the same reason, Palestinian refugees under the mandate of the United Nations Relief and Works Agency for Palestine Refugees in the Near East (UNRWA) are not reported in the UNHCR statelessness table. Instead, they are referred to elsewhere in UNHCR's statistical reporting.

While the two UN conventions on statelessness constitute the primary international framework for the protection of stateless persons and the reduction of statelessness, there are also regional instruments of great importance. The 1997 European Convention on Nationality, for example, has contributed to protecting the rights of stateless persons and provides standards for reducing statelessness in the Council of Europe region. That document emphasizes the need of every person to have a nationality, and seeks to clarify the rights and responsibilities of states in ensuring individual access to a nationality.

Some of the largest populations of stateless persons are found in Algeria, Bangladesh, Bhutan, Cambodia, Democratic Republic of the Congo, Dominican Republic, Estonia, India, Ivory Coast, Kenya, Latvia, Malaysia, Mauritania, Myanmar, Nepal, Brunei, Saudi Arabia, Bahrain, the United Arab Emirates, Kuwait, Qatar, Iraq, Syria, Lebanon, and Thailand.

== Notable cases ==
=== Airports ===
Some stateless people have received widespread public attention in airports due to their status as ports of entry.

One famous case is that of Mehran Karimi Nasseri, who lived in Charles de Gaulle Airport in Paris, France for approximately 18 years after he was denied entry to the country. His Iranian passport and UN refugee documents had been stolen. He may have had a British mother, but he did not have British citizenship. The 1994 French film Tombés du ciel and the 2004 American film The Terminal are fictional stories inspired by his experiences.

=== During change of citizenship ===
Countries that restrict multiple nationality often require immigrants who apply for naturalisation to obtain official documentation from their countries of origin proving that they are no longer citizens. In others, including Taiwan, the documentation must be provided prior to the granting of citizenship. During the period between the cancellation of the prior citizenship and the granting of the new citizenship by naturalization, the applicant may be officially stateless. In two cases in Taiwan, Pakistani immigrants applied for naturalization and renounced their Pakistani citizenship. In the interim, the decisions to permit their naturalization as citizens of Taiwan were reversed, leaving them stateless.

=== "The Man From Taured" ===
In 1960, John Zegrus was detained in Japan on charges of identity fraud. Authorities determined that Zegrus had entered Japan using a counterfeit passport. When asked about his identity, Zegrus spun an elaborate personal history (later determined to be entirely fabricated), claiming, among other things, that he had served as a fighter pilot in the Royal Air Force during World War II; that he had been captured by Germany as a prisoner of war; that he became a spy for the United States after the war's end; and that he was now on a "secret mission" for the United Arab Republic, working to recruit volunteers from the Japanese military. A court sentenced Zegrus to one year in prison for identity fraud, after which he was deported to Hong Kong. A contemporary Canadian newspaper account of the incident provided additional details, claiming that Zegrus was a spy for Egypt, that his passport was issued at Tamanrasset (a province in Algeria), and that he possessed texts written in the "Taured language" ("Taured" probably being a corruption of Tuareg, an ethnic group residing in the Saharan region, including Algeria).

Over the following decades, various retellings and embellishments of Zegrus's story formed the basis of an urban legend claiming that a "man from another dimension" had arrived at Japan's Haneda Airport in 1954 with a passport from the nonexistent country of "Taured." When asked to locate his nation of origin on a map, the man pointed to the country of Andorra, but insisted that this was, in fact, Taured, a country that had existed for 1,000 years. The mystery man was purportedly held for questioning in a secure hotel room, from which he later disappeared without a trace.

== By country ==
=== Australia ===
As of 30 April 2017, Australia had 37 stateless people in onshore detention, who had been detained for an average of 2 years and 106 days and the longest was 3 years and 250 days. The number of stateless people in offshore detention is unknown. There were a further 57 stateless people living in the community after being approved for a residence determination. In Australia, statelessness is not itself a ground for grant of a visa and the person must instead rely upon other grounds, such as being a refugee. Notable cases include:

- Ahmed Al-Kateb, a Palestinian man born in Kuwait who was denied a visa on arrival in Australia in 2000 and did not meet the requirements of a refugee. Al-Kateb wished to return to Kuwait or Gaza. However, Kuwait would not accept him (as he was not a Kuwaiti citizen or resident) and there was no state of Palestine recognized by Australia at that time. To return him to Gaza required the approval of Israel. The High Court of Australia held in Al-Kateb v Godwin that his detention was lawful, even though it would continue indefinitely. Al-Kateb and eight other stateless people were granted bridging visas in 2005 and, while this meant they were released from detention, they were unable to work, study or obtain various government benefits. Al-Kateb was granted a permanent visa in October 2007.
- 'Baby Ferouz' was born in November 2013 to Rohingya Muslim parents who had fled from Myanmar, which did not recognise them as citizens. His parents and siblings were being held at the Nauru Detention Centre, but the family was flown to Brisbane due to complications in pregnancy, with the result that baby Ferouz was born in Australia. From 1986, Australia has not automatically granted citizenship to people born in Australia, despite the provision in the 1961 Convention on the Reduction of Statelessness requiring nationality to be given to children born in a territory who would otherwise be stateless. As baby Ferouz was deemed to be an unauthorised maritime arrival, he could not be given a protection visa. In December 2014 he and his family were given a temporary protection visa which allowed them to be released from immigration detention.
- Said Imasi is believed to be from Western Sahara and had been granted a protection visa in Norway in 2004. In January 2010 he had a one-way ticket to New Zealand, traveling on a friend's passport, and was detained on a stop-over in Melbourne. His application for a refugee visa was refused because he did not have a "well-founded fear of persecution" in Norway. Because he has no visa to be in Australia and there is no country to which he can be returned, Imasi has been in immigration detention since January 2010, spending several years at the Christmas Island Detention Centre and later at the Villawood Immigration Detention Centre in Sydney. As of May 2023, Imasi has been released under unknown conditions.

=== Bahrain ===
Many individuals in Bahrain, called Bidoon, do not have a nationality. A number of people have also had their citizenship revoked and are now stateless; the revocation took place after they criticised the Bahraini government. This situation also occurs in other Middle Eastern countries.

=== Brazil ===
Maha Mamo tells her story in this UN Brazil #IBelong campaign video.

Brazil is among the few countries in the world to have in its law the recognition of a stateless person to provide documents to this person as an official citizen of the country. Maha and Souad Mamo, who had lived in Brazil for four years as refugees, were the first stateless persons recognized by the Brazilian state after the creation of the new migration law (Law No. 13,445), which came into force in 2017. The migration law provides protective measures for stateless persons, facilitating the guarantees of social inclusion and simplified naturalization for citizens without a homeland. The legislation follows international conventions of respect for stateless persons and seeks to reduce the number of people in this situation, giving the right to request nationality. Countries having similar laws usually offer stateless persons the access to basic rights such as education and health, while in their documents they are still recognized as stateless with a residence permit. With its law, Brazil offers naturalization, which means that these persons can by all effects become Brazilians. If the stateless persons do not wish to apply for immediate naturalization, they are granted at least definitive residency in the country.

=== Brunei ===
Many stateless permanent residents live in Brunei. Most have lived on Bruneian soil for generations, but Bruneian nationality is governed by the policy of jus sanguinis; the right to hold it comes from blood ties. The government of Brunei has made obtaining citizenship possible, albeit difficult, for stateless persons who have inhabited Brunei for many generations. Requirements include rigorous tests in Malay culture, customs, and language. Stateless permanent residents of Brunei are given an International Certificate of Identity, which allows them to travel overseas. The majority of Brunei's Chinese and Indians are permanent residents who are stateless.

Holders of International Certificates of Identity can enter Germany and Hungary visa-free for a maximum of 90 days within a 180-day period. In the case of Germany, in theory, for an individual to benefit from the visa exemption, the ICI must be issued under the terms of the 1954 Convention Relating to the Status of Stateless Persons, and it must contain an authorization to return to Brunei with a sufficiently long period of validity.

Brunei is a signatory to the 1959 Declaration of the Rights of the Child, which states that "the child shall be entitled from his birth to a name and a nationality", but it does not currently follow the guidelines of the convention. The Sultan of Brunei has announced changes that may expedite the process by which stateless persons with permanent residence status sit for citizenship exams.

=== Canada ===
An amendment to the Canadian Citizenship Act, 1976 (S.C. 2008, c. 14, previously Bill C-37) came into effect on April 17, 2009, and changed the rules for the acquisition of foreign-born Canadian citizenship. Individuals born outside Canada could become Canadian citizens by descent only if at least one of their parents was either a native-born citizen or a naturalised citizen of Canada.

The 2009 law limited citizenship by descent to one generation born outside Canada. All individuals born within one generation of the native-born or naturalised citizen parent were automatically recognised as Canadian citizens, but second-generation descendants born abroad were no longer citizens of Canada at birth, and such individuals might have been stateless if they have no claim to any other citizenship. Since the 2009 changes, this situation occurred at least twice:

- Rachel Chandler was born in China, to a Libyan-born father who is a Canadian citizen through the provision in the above paragraph and a mother who is a Chinese citizen. Because of the nationality laws of Canada and China, she was not eligible for citizenship in either country and was apparently born stateless. However, because Chandler's paternal grandfather was born in Ireland, she was entitled to Irish citizenship and now holds an Irish passport.
- Chloé Goldring was born in Belgium, to a Canadian father born in Bermuda and an Algerian mother. She was not eligible for automatic citizenship in Algeria, Belgium, or Canada, and was thus born stateless. Goldring is now a Canadian citizen.

In 2025, Bill C-3 removed the one-generation limit on Canadian citizenship by descent.

=== Dominican Republic ===
An estimated 800,000 Haitians reside in the Dominican Republic. For much of its history, the Dominican Republic had a jus soli policy, meaning that all children born in the country, even to undocumented parents, were automatically given citizenship. Most countries in the Western Hemisphere practice this policy, but in June 2013, the Dominican high court amended existing legislation to exclude from jus soli citizenship children born "in transit", such as the children of foreign diplomats and "those on their way to another country". Since 2013, the law has been expanded to address the children of non-citizens, such as Haitian migrants who immigrated after 1929.

Since the passing of the amendment, nearly 200,000 Dominicans of Haitian descent have been stripped of their Dominican citizenship. Without birth certificates, identification, or nationality, they are stateless and living illegally in the Dominican Republic. As of July 2015, according to the International Organization for Migration, about 1,133 individuals had voluntarily or involuntarily relocated to Haiti. By law, many are eligible to apply for naturalised citizenship in either Haiti or the Dominican Republic, but financial, bureaucratic, and discriminatory obstacles have prevented many from doing so.

=== Estonia and Latvia ===
Estonia and Latvia, two neighboring European countries, became independent from the Russian Empire in 1918, fell under Soviet occupation from 1940 until German occupation in 1941 and then again under renewed Soviet Occupation after 1944. When their independence was restored in 1991, citizenship was automatically restored to individuals who had been Latvian citizens prior to June 18, 1940, and their descendants or Estonian citizens prior to June 16, 1940, and their descendants. Citizens of the Soviet Union who had moved to Estonia or Latvia while they were occupied by the Soviet Union did not receive citizenship automatically in 1991, and neither did their descendants. They had to apply for naturalisation as immigrants, a process that included a knowledge test and a language test in Estonian or Latvian. Children born after Latvia re-established independence (August 21, 1991), to parents who are both non-citizens, are also entitled to citizenship at the request of at least one of the parents.

These criteria mainly excluded ethnic Russians, Ukrainians, Belorussians, and other ethnic minorities. Thousands of ethnic Latvians and Estonians were also impacted and became stateless. Russia has a visa waiver for stateless persons living in Estonia and Latvia, while Estonian and Latvian citizens need to obtain a visa to enter Russia. These stateless persons can also travel freely within the Schengen area, but they are not permitted to work within the European Union. As of 2013, more than 267,000 residents of Latvia and 91,000 residents of Estonia were stateless.

=== Greece ===
Article 19 of the Greek Citizenship Code (Law 3370 of 1955) stated: "A person of non-Greek ethnic origin leaving Greece without the intention of returning may be declared as having lost Greek citizenship. This also applies to a person of non-Greek ethnic origin born and domiciled abroad. Minor children living abroad may be declared as having lost Greek citizenship if both their parents, or the surviving parent, have lost it as well." (The Minister of the Interior decides such cases, with the concurring opinion of the Citizenship Council.)

Article 19 was abolished in 1998, but no provision was established for restoring citizenship to people who had lost it. Interior Minister Alekos Papadopoulos stated that, since the article's introduction in 1955, 60,000 Greeks had lost their citizenship because of it; many of these people moved and adopted the nationality of another country. However, an estimated 300–1,000 people remain stateless in Greece (primarily minorities in Thrace, some of whom never settled abroad) and other former Greek citizens are stateless outside the country (an estimated 1,400 in Turkey and an unknown number elsewhere).

Stateless individuals in Greece have had difficulty receiving social services like health care and education. Until December 1997, they were denied the protection of the 1954 U.N. Convention Relating to the Status of Stateless Persons, which Greece ratified in 1975. Then, as a result of pressure from nongovernmental organizations and minority deputies, around 100 ethnic Turks made stateless under Article 19 received identity documents from Greek authorities in accordance with the 1954 U.N. Convention. In August 1998, Foreign Minister Theodoros Pangalos stated that within a year, most or all stateless persons living in Greece would be offered Greek citizenship; this promise was repeated in subsequent months by Alternate and Deputy Foreign Ministers George Papandreou and Giannos Kranidiotis. However, the government took no steps to carry out this promise.

=== Hong Kong ===
Hong Kong, as a special administrative region of China, does not have its own citizenship laws. The right of abode is the status that allows unrestricted right to live, work, vote and to hold most public office in Hong Kong; persons with right of abode in Hong Kong are called permanent residents. Most permanent residents of Chinese descent are Chinese citizens as provided by the Chinese nationality law. Citizens of other countries who have obtained right of abode in Hong Kong remain the citizens of their respective countries, and enjoy all the rights accorded to permanent residents except for those restricted to permanent residents with Chinese citizenship, such as the right to a HKSAR passport and the eligibility to be elected for all political offices except as members for 12 functional constituencies.

When Hong Kong was transferred from the United Kingdom to China on July 1, 1997, all British Dependent Territories citizens (BDTCs) connected to Hong Kong lost their British nationality, unless they had applied for the British National (Overseas) (BN(O)) status. Most BDTCs of Chinese descent became Chinese citizens. BDTCs who did not become Chinese citizens and did not apply for BN(O) status while holding no other citizenship became British Overseas citizens (BOCs). As BN(O) and BOC statuses do not provide right of abode in the United Kingdom, BN(O)s and BOCs of non-Chinese descent who do not hold any other citizenship are de facto stateless. However, British nationality law allows BN(O)s and BOCs who are otherwise stateless to register for full British citizenship. In addition, the Chinese nationality law as applied in Hong Kong provides the option of naturalisation as a Chinese national.

Chinese citizens from the mainland who had migrated to Hong Kong on a One-way Permit lose their mainland hukou (household registration). They then must reside in Hong Kong for 7 years before gaining the right of abode in Hong Kong. Therefore, persons who had migrated out of the mainland but have not obtained Hong Kong permanent residency, while technically not stateless, are unable to exercise rights and privileges associated with citizenship in either the mainland or Hong Kong.

Stateless permanent residents of Hong Kong and Chinese migrants without right of abode may apply for a Hong Kong Document of Identity for Visa Purposes, which allows them to travel overseas. This document (with few exceptions) requires the holder to apply for and receive a travel visa prior to departure from Hong Kong.

Children born to foreign domestic workers are not classified as citizens because Chinese nationality is determined by blood ties. Under the visa regulations governing foreign domestic workers, the government of Hong Kong may award an unconditional stay visa. Many of these children can obtain citizenship in their parents' country of birth. When they are put up for adoption, however, citizenship applications can become challenging. In cases where both adoptive parents are Chinese nationals, the children will likely remain stateless. Applying for Chinese citizenship by naturalisation is only possible for permanent residents of Hong Kong, and an unconditional stay visa does not grant this status.

Eliana Rubashkyn, a transgender woman and refugee, became de facto stateless in 2013 after being detained for over eight months on the grounds that her appearance did not match her passport photo. She suffered mistreatment in detention at Chek Lap Kok Airport and in Kowloon's Queen Elizabeth Hospital. She was granted refugee status, but Hong Kong did not recognize her as a refugee because it is not a signatory to the refugee convention of 1951 and sought to deport her to Colombia. In 2013, the UN sought a third country to resettle her due to the lack of protections for LGBT people and refugees in Hong Kong. After almost one year, a UN declaration recognized her as a woman under international law, and she was sent to New Zealand, where she received asylum.

=== South Asia ===
As of 2012, India and Pakistan were each holding several hundred prisoners from the other for violations like trespass or visa overstay, often with accusations of espionage. Some of these prisoners have been denied citizenship in both countries, leaving them stateless. In Pakistani law, if one leaves the country for more than seven years without any registration from a Pakistani embassy or foreign mission of any country, they lose Pakistani citizenship.

In 2012, the BBC reported on the case of Muhammad Idrees, who lived in Pakistan and had been held under Indian police control for approximately 13 years for overstaying his 15-day visa by 2–3 days after seeing his ill parents in 1999. He spent much of those 13 years in prison waiting for a hearing, sometimes homeless or living with volunteer families. Both states denied him citizenship.

The BBC linked these problems to the political atmosphere caused by the Kashmir conflict. The Indian People's Union for Civil Liberties told the BBC it had worked on hundreds of cases with similar features. It called Idrees' case a "violation of all human rights, national and international laws", adding, "Everybody has a right to a nation." The Indian Human Rights Law Network blamed "officials in the home department" and slow courts, and called the case a "miscarriage of justice, a shocking case".

In Bangladesh, about 300,000–500,000 Bihari people (also known as Stranded Pakistanis in Bangladesh) were rendered stateless when Bangladesh seceded from Pakistan in 1971. Bangladesh refused to consider them citizens because of their support for Pakistan in the Bangladesh Liberation War while Pakistan insisted that since Bangladesh was successor state of East Pakistan, the new nation had a responsibility to absorb the Bihari people just as West Pakistan had done with refugees flooding from the war, including Bengali people. As a result, the Bihari people became stateless.

Over 100,000 Bhutanese refugees, who have neither Bhutanese nor Nepalese citizenship, reside in Nepal.

=== Indonesia ===
In February 2020, the Indonesia government stated that any Indonesian national who ever joined the Islamic State of Iraq and the Levant (ISIL) had automatically lost their Indonesian citizenship. Presidential Chief of Staff Moeldoko stated that the ISIL sympathizers "are stateless". Article 23 of Indonesian nationality law states that Indonesian nationals can lose their citizenship after, among other things, "joining a foreign military or taking an oath of allegiance to another country".

=== Japan ===
When Japan lost control over Korea in 1945, those Koreans who remained in Japan received Chōsen-seki, a designation of nationality that did not actually grant them citizenship. Roughly half of these people later received South Korean citizenship. The other half were affiliated with North Korea, which is unrecognized by Japan, and they are legally stateless. Practically speaking, they mostly hold North Korean citizenship (albeit meaningless in Japan, their country of residence) and may repatriate there, and under Japanese law, they are treated as foreign nationals and given the full privileges entitled to that class. In 2010, Chōsen-seki holders were banned from South Korea.

UNHCR published a study on statelessness in Japan in 2010.

=== Kuwait ===
Kuwait has the largest stateless population in the entire region. In 2024, Kuwait revoked the citizenship of 42,000 people in just six months. Most stateless Bedoon of Kuwait belong to the northern tribes, especially the Al-Muntafiq tribal confederation. A minority of stateless Bedoon in Kuwait belong to the 'Ajam community.

Under the terms of the Kuwait Nationality Law 15/1959, all the Bedoon in Kuwait are eligible for Kuwaiti nationality by naturalization. In practice, it is widely believed that Sunnis of Persian descent or tribal Saudis can readily achieve Kuwaiti naturalization whilst Bedoon of Iraqi tribal ancestry cannot. As a result, many Bedoon in Kuwait feel pressured to hide their background.

From 1965 until 1985, the Bedoon were treated as Kuwaiti citizens and guaranteed citizenship: they had free access to education, health care and all the other privileges of citizenship. The stateless Bedoon constituted 80–90% of the Kuwaiti Army in the 1970s and 1980s until the Gulf War.

In 1985, at the height of the Iran–Iraq War, the Bedoon were reclassified as "illegal residents" and denied Kuwaiti citizenship and its accompanying privileges. The Iran–Iraq War threatened Kuwait's internal stability and the authorities feared the sectarian background of the stateless Bedoon. The Bedoon issue in Kuwait "overlaps with historic sensitivities about Iraqi influence inside Kuwait", with many of those denied Kuwaiti nationality being believed to have originated from Iraq.

In 1985, the then emir, Jaber Al-Ahmad Al-Sabah, escaped an assassination attempt. After the assassination attempt, the government changed the Bedoon's status from that of legal residents to illegal residents. By 1986, the Bedoon were fully excluded from the same social and economic rights as Kuwaiti citizens.

Since 1986, the Kuwaiti government has refused to grant any form of documentation to the Bedoon, including birth certificates, death certificates, identity cards, marriage certificates, and driving licences. The Bedoon also face many restrictions in employment, travel and education. They are not permitted to educate their children in state schools and universities.

In 1995, Human Rights Watch reported that there were 300,000 stateless Bedoon; this number was cited by then Labour MP George Galloway in an adjournment debate.

According to several human rights organizations, the State of Kuwait is committing ethnic cleansing and genocide against the stateless Bedoon. The Kuwaiti Bedoon crisis resembles the Rohingya crisis in Myanmar. In 1995, it was reported in the House of Commons of the United Kingdom that the Al Sabah ruling family had deported 150,000 stateless Bedoon to refugee camps in the Kuwaiti desert near the Iraqi border with minimal water, insufficient food and no basic shelter, and that they were threatened with death if they returned to their homes in Kuwait City. As a result, many of the stateless Bedoon fled to Iraq, where they remain stateless people even today. The Kuwaiti government also stands accused of attempting to falsify their nationalities in official state documents. There have been reports of forced disappearances and mass graves of Bedoon.

The 1995 Human Rights Watch report stated:

The totality of the treatment of the Bedoons amounts to a policy of denationalization of native residents, relegating them to an apartheid-like existence in their own country. The Kuwaiti government policy of harassment and intimidation of the Bedoons and of denying them the right to lawful residence, employment, travel and movement, contravene basic principles of human rights. Denial of citizenship to the Bedoons clearly violates international law. Denying Bedoons the right to petition the courts to challenge governmental decisions regarding their claims to citizenship and lawful residence in the country violates the universal right to due process of law and equality before the law.

British MP George Galloway stated:

Of all the human rights atrocities committed by the ruling family in Kuwait, the worst and the greatest is that against the people known as the Bedoons. There are more than 300,000 Bedoons—one third of Kuwait's native population. Half of them—150,000—have been driven into refugee camps in the desert across the Iraqi border by the regime and left there to bake and to rot. The other 150,000 are treated not as second-class or even fifth-class citizens, but not as any sort of citizen. They are bereft of all rights. It is a scandal that almost no one in the world cares a thing about the plight of 300,000 people, 150,000 of them cast out of the land in which they have lived [when] many have lived in the Kuwaiti area for many centuries.

By 2004, the Bedoon accounted for only 40% of the Kuwaiti Army, a major reduction from their presence in the 1970s and 1980s. In 2013, the UK government estimated that there were 110,729 "documented" Bedoon in Kuwait, without giving a total estimate, but noting that all stateless individuals in Kuwait remain at risk of persecution and human rights breaches. The Bedoon are generally categorized into three groups: stateless tribespeople, stateless police/military, and the stateless children of Kuwaiti women who married Bedoon men. According to the Kuwaiti government, there are only 93,000 "documented" Bedoon in Kuwait. In 2018, the Kuwaiti government claimed that it would naturalize up to 4,000 stateless Bedoon per year but this is considered unlikely.

In recent years, the rate of suicide among Bedoon has risen sharply.

=== Malta ===
The 2021 census recorded the presence of 171 stateless people in Malta, but this figure is likely an undercount, with the actual number possibly amounting to hundreds of people. Most of them are children, including those born in the country to rejected asylum seekers.

=== Myanmar ===
The Rohingya people are a minority group in Myanmar (formerly Burma). They are considered racially inferior by the Myanmar government, and are thus denied citizenship from birth. Instead, they are given identification cards which single them out and which do not grant them the rights of citizenship. This has created some 700,000 stateless persons, been a basis for the Rohingya genocide, and precipitated an international refugee crisis.

=== Pakistan ===
In Karachi there is a stateless population of approximately 1.2 million Pakistani Bengalis.

As of January 2022, there were approximately 3 million Afghans living in Pakistan. Of those, around 1.4 million of them are Proof of Registration (PoR) cardholders, approximately 840,000 hold an Afghan Citizen Card (ACC), and an estimated 775,000 are undocumented.

=== Palestinians ===
Abbas Shiblak estimates that over half of the Palestinian people in the world are stateless.

Palestinians in Lebanon and those in Syria are constitutionally denied citizenship, and are thus stateless.

After Israel annexed East Jerusalem following the Six-Day War in 1967, Palestinians living there received, along with Israeli permanent residency status, the right to apply for citizenship. Shortly after the offer was made, it was rejected by Arab leaders. Between 1967 and 2007, only 12,000 of the 250,000 Palestinians living in Jerusalem have been granted Israeli citizenship. Since 2007, more have applied, although the majority still reject it. Those who do not have Israeli citizenship are generally stateless.

Many descendants of Palestinian refugees live permanently in countries of which they would be expected to be citizens, but they are not citizens because that country adheres to the policy of the Arab League in denying citizenship to Palestinians.

Even though Palestinians living in the West Bank and the Gaza Strip were issued Palestinian passports under the Oslo Accords, and recognition of Palestinian statehood is mostly widely acknowledged internationally as of 2026, some countries (such as the United States) recognize them as travel documents but do not recognize their citizenship. According to international law, only states can have nationals (meaning citizens), meaning that the remainder states who do not consider Palestine a state implements such policies and deem its holders as "stateless".

A similar situation exists for Armenians in Israel and Palestine, where as of 2023, about 2,000 Armenians in Israeli-controlled territory were stateless.

=== Philippines ===
As of 2021, there are around 700 people of Japanese descent who are considered as stateless. Most of these people are descendants of Japanese fathers who settled in the Philippines in the early 20th century. Due to the outbreak of the World War II, many of these individuals separated from their fathers who either enlisted in the Imperial Japanese Army, repatriated to Japan or died during the war. After the war many of them settled in more remote areas of the Philippines and discarded proof of the Japanese nationality as a preventive measure against anti-Japanese retaliatory attacks due to atrocities committed by Japan during the war.

=== Puerto Rico ===
In 1994, Juan Mari Brás, a Puerto Rican lawyer and political historian, renounced his American citizenship before a consular agent in the United States Embassy of Venezuela. In December 1995, his loss of nationality was confirmed by the US Department of State. That same month, he requested that the Puerto Rico State Department furnish him with proof of his Puerto Rican citizenship. The request involved more than just a bureaucratic formality; Mari Brás tested the self-determination of Puerto Rico by trying to become the first Puerto Rican citizen who was not also an American citizen.

Mari Brás claimed that as a Puerto Rican national born and raised in Puerto Rico, he was clearly a Puerto Rican citizen and therefore had every right to continue to reside, work, and, most importantly, vote in Puerto Rico. The State Department responded promptly, claiming that Puerto Rican citizenship did not exist independent of American citizenship, and in 1998, the department rescinded its recognition of his renunciation of citizenship. The official response to Mari Brás stated that Puerto Rican citizenship existed only as an equivalent to residency. However, the Puerto Rico State Department issues certificates of citizenship to people born outside of Puerto Rico to a Puerto Rican parent, including some people who may have never resided in the territory.

=== Qatar ===
Most of Qatar's Bedoon are stateless tribesmen from the Ghufrani tribe. In 2005, Qatar stripped the citizenship of over 5,000 members of the tribe. After international outcry, it restored the citizenship of approximately 2,000. Today, there are between 1,200 and 1,500 Bedoon in Qatar.

=== Saudi Arabia ===
Dissidents and other people can have their citizenship revoked. Osama bin Laden was asked to hand in his passport in the 1990s.

=== Syria ===
By 2011, close to an estimated 300,000 stateless Kurds were in Syria. While the government's implementation of the 2011 Decree did reduce the number of stateless persons, a significant part of Syria's remaining statelessness problem has now been 'exported' to new geographic and legal contexts with the displacement of affected persons out of the country.

=== Thailand ===
The UNCHR estimates 574,200 stateless people born and living in Thailand in 2022, up from 443,862 in 2016. Mostly they are from hill tribes or are the children of illegal migrants, most of them from Myanmar. Stateless people in Thailand suffer serious disadvantages. Unlike Thai citizens, they cannot use government facilities where they must first show an ID card. They cannot go to a clinic or hospital for treatment of illness or injury. They cannot open a bank account. They cannot buy and use a smartphone, or own and drive a car, or buy property or a home. Some progress is being made, but "these efforts are halfhearted and plagued with bureaucratic hurdles" according to the Bangkok Post. It gives as an example a new law, passed in 2008, that grants Thai citizenship to stateless people. But it applies only to those who were born before 26 February 1992, thus impacting the young most harshly. The good news is that stateless children can now attend state schools. Also, a new law allows stateless people to seek employment in professions not explicitly reserved for Thais. State hospitals now issue birth certificates to all children, a formality often neglected in the past. Importantly, the Thai military government has adopted the goal of "zero statelessness" by 2024. In 2024, the government planned pathways for stateless people to gain permanent residency and eventually citizenship for themselves and their Thai-born children.

=== Turkey ===
Following a failed coup in 2016, the Turkish government revoked about 50,000 passports. While most of the people whose passports were revoked were in Turkey at the time, one notable Turkish expatriate affected by this action was NBA player Enes Kanter. He is a vocal critic of Turkish president Recep Tayyip Erdoğan and a public supporter of the Gülen movement, which the government blamed for the coup attempt. Kanter's passport was canceled while he was attempting to travel to the U.S., and he was briefly detained in Romania before being allowed to continue his travel. Turkey issued an arrest warrant against Kanter in May 2017, claiming that he was a member of "an armed terrorist organization". The government's action effectively rendered Kanter stateless, and soon after this incident expressed a desire to seek U.S. citizenship. He then held a U.S. green card, which technically enabled him to travel to and from Canada for games in Toronto. However, in the 2018–19 season, Kanter did not travel with his team to games in London or Toronto because Turkey had requested an Interpol red notice against him. On November 29, 2021, he became a naturalized U.S. citizen, changing his name to Enes Kanter Freedom.

=== Ukraine ===
After the completion of his term, Georgian President Mikheil Saakashvili moved to Ukraine where he was given citizenship and appointed Governor of Ukraine's Odesa Oblast. Due to Georgian restrictions on dual nationality, he was stripped of his Georgian citizenship.

While visiting the U.S. in 2017, Saakashvili's Ukrainian citizenship was revoked by Ukrainian President Petro Poroshenko, leaving Saakashvili stateless. After the election of Volodymyr Zelenskyy in 2019, Saakashvili's Ukrainian citizenship was restored.

=== United Arab Emirates ===
In the United Arab Emirates some stateless people were granted citizenship after many years and even decades. Children of a foreign parent were also granted citizenship.

=== United Kingdom ===
Different classes in British nationality law have led to situations in which people were considered British subjects but not nationals, or in which people held a British passport without right of abode in the United Kingdom. Examples include British Protected Persons, who are considered British nationals. British nationals (irrespective of the class of nationality) who reside abroad but are not entitled to protection by the British government are de facto stateless.

Many situations that put people at risk of statelessness were resolved after April 30, 2003, when the Nationality, Immigration and Asylum Act 2002 came into force. As a result of this act, the United Kingdom gave most people with residual British nationality but no other citizenship the right to register as full British citizens. However, there are still some people who have not been able or willing to register as citizens. Following the publication of a joint UNHCR-Asylum Aid report in 2011, the UK adopted a statelessness determination procedure in 2013.

In 2014, the Immigration Act 2014 extended the powers of the Home Secretary to deprive a naturalised British citizen of their citizenship, even if that renders the individual stateless, if the Secretary of State is satisfied that the deprivation of citizenship is conducive to the public good because the person "has conducted him or herself in a manner which is seriously prejudicial to the vital interests of the UK." A naturalised British citizen is someone who was not born a British citizen but has become one through the legal process of naturalisation, by which someone with no automatic claim to British citizenship can obtain the same rights and privileges as someone who was born a British citizen.

In 2019, Sajid Javid exercised this power in respect of Shamima Begum, a former member of the Islamic State (IS) who had intended to return to the UK. The decision was controversial as Begum had travelled to Syria at the age of 15 in order to marry an IS fighter, making her a victim of child sex trafficking. Her third child, who subsequently died, was consequently also denied citizenship. The lawfulness of the decision was challenged on the grounds that it may not be exercised so as to make a person stateless (it was argued that she was entitled to citizenship of Bangladesh, which Bangladesh denied), but the Supreme Court upheld it on national security grounds. As of 2026, an appeal is ongoing in the European Court of Human Rights.

=== United States ===
The United States, which is not a signatory to the 1954 Convention on the Status of Stateless Persons or the 1961 Convention on the Reduction of Statelessness, is one of the countries that allow their citizens to renounce their citizenship even if they do not hold any other. The Foreign Affairs Manual instructs State Department employees to make it clear to Americans who will become stateless after renunciation that they may face extreme difficulties (including deportation back to the United States) following their renunciation, but to afford such persons their right to give up citizenship. Former Americans who have voluntarily made themselves stateless include Garry Davis in the beginning years of the United Nations, Thomas Jolley during the Vietnam War, Joel Slater as a political protest in 1987 while believing that he would obtain Australian citizenship, and Mike Gogulski as a political protest in 2008 without attempting to take any other citizenship. The UNHCR published a report on statelessness in the United States in 2012 in which it recommended the establishment of a determination procedure that incorporates a definition of statelessness in accordance with international law to ensure that stateless persons are permitted to reside in the United States.

The Fourteenth Amendment to the United States Constitution granted citizenship to African American former slaves. The Supreme Court ruling in United States v. Wong Kim Ark clarified that people born to aliens on US soil were entitled to citizenship under the Fourteenth Amendment. However, it excluded Native Americans by defining a citizen as any person born in the US, but only if "subject to the jurisdiction thereof"; this latter clause excluded anyone who was born in tribal nations within the United States, as the Supreme Court ruled in the 1884 case of Elk v. Wilkins that they are "quasi-foreign nations who deal with Congress using treaties". The Indian Citizenship Act of 1924 addressed the issue by granting citizenship to America's indigenous peoples.

The Center for Migration Studies of New York estimated 218,000 stateless people were in the United States in 2017, based on the American Community Survey.

=== Uruguay ===
Uruguay has ratified both the 1954 Convention on the Status of Stateless Persons and the 1961 Convention on the Reduction of Statelessness, and implemented law 19682 to meet these ratified commitments. It is also a signatory of the "Brazil Declaration" which commits countries in the South American region to end statelessness by January 1, 2024.

However, the 1968 law provides for Uruguayan citizenship as one of the mechanisms to end statelessness. While the process of naturalization to citizenship is similar to other ius domicilii regimes, it does not lead to Uruguayan nationality. As a result, stateless residents will become stateless citizens, and also citizens of countries that do not allow for dual citizenship also become stateless citizens of Uruguay. Uruguayan passports issued to this group of citizens highlights their status through "XXX" in the national field, meaning "unknown nationality".

== Organizations ==
=== United Nations High Commissioner for Refugees ===
==== Statelessness mandate ====
UNHCR's responsibilities were initially limited to stateless persons who were refugees, as set out in Paragraph 6(A)(II) of its statute and Article 1(A)(2) of the 1951 Convention relating to the Status of Refugees. They were expanded following the adoption of the 1954 Convention relating to the Status of Stateless Persons and the 1961 Convention on the Reduction of Statelessness. General Assembly Resolutions 3274 (XXIV) and 31/36 designated UNHCR as the body responsible for examining the cases of persons who claimed the benefit of the 1961 convention and assisting such persons in presenting their claims to the appropriate national authorities. Subsequently, the United Nations General Assembly conferred upon UNHCR a global mandate for the identification, prevention, and reduction of statelessness and for the international protection of stateless persons. This mandate has continued to evolve as the General Assembly has endorsed the conclusions of the UNHCR Executive Committee, notably Executive Committee Conclusion No. 106 of 2006 on the "identification, prevention, and reduction of statelessness and protection of stateless persons".

==== Global campaign to end statelessness ====
The UNHCR launched a global campaign on November 4, 2014, to end statelessness within 10 years.

As part of the campaign, it published a special report providing a comprehensive overview of statelessness and delving into the human impact of the phenomenon. It also published an open letter addressed to states, urging them to take action. In addition to UNHCR High Commissioner António Guterres, the letter was signed by Angelina Jolie, a UNHCR special envoy; Surin Pitsuwan, former secretary-general of ASEAN; Shirin Ebadi, a Nobel Peace Prize laureate; Archbishop Emeritus Desmond Tutu; Barbara Hendricks, a UNHCR honorary lifetime goodwill ambassador; Madeleine Albright, former US secretary of state; Carla Del Ponte, former chief prosecutor of two UN international criminal tribunals; Zeid Ra'ad Al Hussein and Louise Arbour, former UN high commissioners for human rights; and Dame Rosalyn Higgins, former president of the International Court of Justice, among others.

In addition, a "global action plan to end statelessness" was launched following consultation with states, civil society, and international organisations. It sets out a guiding framework of 10 actions that need to be taken to end statelessness by 2024.

The plan includes actions to:

- resolve existing situations of statelessness;
- prevent new cases of statelessness from emerging; and
- better identify and protect stateless persons.

The 10 actions are:

- Action 1: Resolve existing major situations of statelessness.
- Action 2: Ensure that no child is born stateless.
- Action 3: Remove gender discrimination from nationality laws.
- Action 4: Prevent denial, loss, or deprivation of nationality on discriminatory grounds.
- Action 5: Prevent statelessness in cases of state succession.
- Action 6: Grant protection status to stateless migrants and facilitate their naturalisation.
- Action 7: Ensure birth registration for the prevention of statelessness.
- Action 8: Issue nationality documentation to those entitled to it.
- Action 9: Accede to the UN statelessness conventions.
- Action 10: Improve quantitative and qualitative data on stateless populations.

=== International Stateless Persons Organisation ===
In March 2012, the International Stateless Persons Organisation (ISPO), an international non-governmental organization, was founded by Dr. Fernando Macolor Cruz, a tribal prince and instructor of history and political science at Palawan State University in the Philippines. It aims to provide institutional representation to stateless persons throughout the world through a network of volunteer human rights law practitioners who act as country representatives.

=== Institute on Statelessness and Inclusion ===
The Institute on Statelessness and Inclusion (ISI), is the first and only civil society organisation dedicated to promoting the right to a nationality and the rights of stateless people globally. It works with partners around the world to promote everyone's equal right to a nationality and the human rights of all stateless people, while supporting stateless people in their efforts to achieve meaningful change. ISI works to strengthen resilience, leadership, collaboration and resourcing of stateless-led initiatives and ensuring that those impacted by statelessness lead and are centred in efforts to address statelessness. It serves as incubator of the Global Movement Against Statelessness and as an active steering group member of the Global Statelessness Fund. ISI helps to connect and facilitate exchange between individuals and groups working on the issue, including as the convenor of regular learning programmes and the World Conferences on Statelessness. ISI also contributes towards strengthening the evidence base for action and facilitating information and knowledge-sharing, including by reporting on developments and opportunities in its Monthly Bulletin and curating the online knowledge platform StatelessHub. It plays a bridging role between different stakeholders – including by supporting civil society engagement with UN human rights mechanisms, as co-convenor of the world's only dedicated journal on statelessness, the Statelessness and Citizenship Review, and by making connections with key actors working on intersecting issues. ISI is established as a Dutch foundation ('stichting') and has two offices: in Rotterdam and London.

=== European Network on Statelessness ===
The European Network on Statelessness, a civil society alliance, was set up to address the problem of 600,000 stateless persons in Europe and to act as a coordinating body and expert resource for organisations across Europe that work with or come into contact with stateless persons.

== See also ==
- Alien (law)
- Canvas ceiling
- Certificate of identity
- List of people who have lived at airports
- "The Man Without a Country"
- Multiple citizenship
- Perpetual foreigner
- Perpetual traveler
- Uncontacted peoples
