= Stateless person's travel document =

Travel document issued to stateless persons

A Stateless person's travel document, also known as a 1954 Convention travel document, is a travel document issued to a stateless person by a country signatory to the 1954 Convention Relating to the Status of Stateless Persons. The 1954 convention travel document is designed to function in lieu of a passport, since passports are generally unavailable to stateless people, as they are usually issued by one's country of nationality.

Different countries have different models for the 1954 Convention travel document.

Some countries, such as Australia and Japan, issue to stateless people travel documents with other names, such as Certificate of identity or Re-entry permit, etc., regardless of whether the country is a contracting state of 1954 Convention.

== Gallery ==
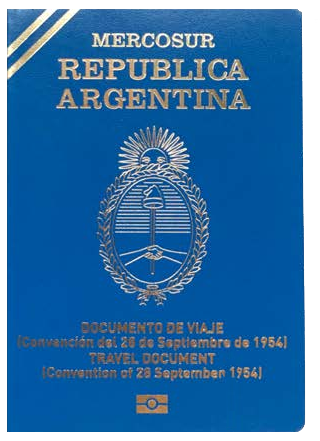
Cover of a Travel document for stateless persons (1954 Convention Travel Document) issued by Argentina

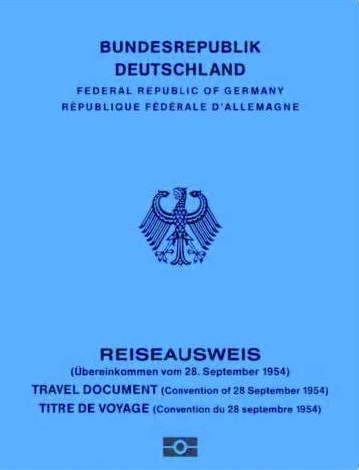
Cover of a Travel document for stateless persons (1954 Convention Travel Document) issued by Germany

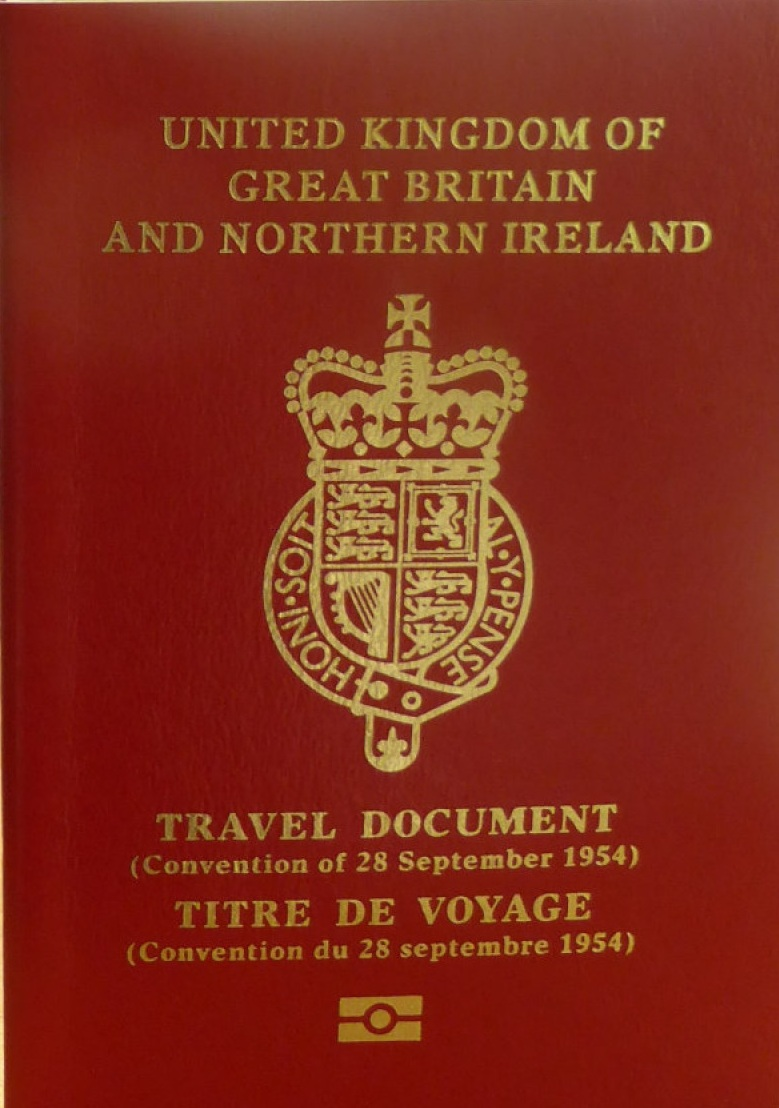
Cover of a Travel document for stateless persons (1954 Convention Travel Document) issued by the United Kingdom

== See also ==
- Refugee travel document
- Travel document
- Passport
- Passport for foreign nationals
- Refugee identity certificate
