= Malaysian Certificate of Identity =

Travel document

- Type: Travel document
- Issued by: Malaysia
- Purpose: International travel document
- Eligibility: Malaysian permanent residents who are stateless
- Expiration: 5 years

The Malaysian Certificate of Identity (Malay: Surat Akuan Pengenalan) is an international travel document issued by the Immigration Department of Malaysia to Malaysian permanent residents who are stateless.

== Use ==
A holder of a Certificate of Identity can enter Germany and Hungary visa-free for a maximum of 90 days within a 180-day period.
