= Convention Relating to the Status of Stateless Persons =

1954 United Nations treaty

- States parties and signatories to the 1954 Convention relating to the Status of Stateless Persons. States parties are dark blue; former parties are red
- Signed: 28 September 1954
- Location: New York City, United States
- Effective: 6 June 1960
- Condition: 6 ratifications
- Signatories: 23
- Parties: 99
- Depositary: Secretary-General of the United Nations
- Languages: English; French; Spanish

The Convention Relating to the Status of Stateless Persons is a 1954 United Nations multilateral treaty that aims to protect stateless individuals.

== Surrounding events ==
The United Nations Charter and Universal Declaration of Human Rights were approved on 10 December 1948. The Declaration at Article 15 affirms that:

1. Everyone has the right to a nationality.
2. No one shall be arbitrarily deprived of his nationality nor denied the right to change his nationality.

The Convention relating to the Status of Refugees was promulgated on 28 July 1951. Despite an original intention, it did not include any content about the status of stateless persons and there was no protocol regarding measures to reduce statelessness.

On 26 April 1954, ECOSOC adopted a Resolution to convene a Conference of Plenipotentiaries to "regulate and improve the status of stateless persons by an international agreement".

The ensuing Conference adopted the Convention on 28 September 1954.

The Convention entered into force on 6 June 1960.

== Content ==
The key substantive content of the convention is listed below.

Article 1:
The Convention applies to stateless persons under the protection of the UNHCR but not to those under the protection of other UN agencies (i.e., UNRWA). It does not apply to persons with rights and obligations acknowledged by their country of residence as indistinguishable from those attached to the possession of that country's nationality. It does not apply to war criminals or to the perpetrators of crimes against humanity or against peace. It does not apply to those who have demonstrated themselves to have been enemies of international peace and co-operation.
Article 7:
Contracting States shall accord to stateless persons the same treatment as is accorded to aliens generally.
Article 8:
No "exceptional measures" to be taken against stateless persons in a Contracting State because of their former nationality.
Article 9:
Provisional measures affecting stateless persons may be taken in time of war or grave emergency where national security is at issue.
Article 10:
Forcible removal of a stateless person from territory of a Contracting State due to Second World War to count as residence in that territory.
Article 11:
Admonition of States to show sympathy to stateless seaman regularly engaged on ships of that State's flag.
Article 12:
Personal status (e.g. marital status) of a stateless person to be governed by the law of his/her domicile ahead of the law of his/her residence.
Article 13:
Rights to property to be no less than accorded to aliens generally.
Article 14:
Intellectual property rights to be no less than accorded by a Contracting State to its own nationals.
Article 15:
Right of association to be no less than accorded by each Contracting State to aliens generally.
Article 16:
Stateless persons not to be discriminated against in providing "security for costs and eventual penalty", or otherwise by courts in Contracting States.
Article 17–19:
Stateless persons to be treated at least as favourably as aliens generally with regard to participation in wage-earning employment.
Article 20–23:
Stateless persons to be treated no less favourably than nationals with respect to rationing, housing, public education, and public relief.
Article 24:
Extension of Articles 20–23 to labour legislation and social security.
Article 27:
Upon request, Contracting States shall issue travel and identity documents to stateless persons within their territory.
Article 29:
No discrimination against stateless persons in fiscal charges.
Article 30:
Stateless persons to be permitted to transfer their assets to the place of their resettlement.
Article 31:
Stateless persons not to be expelled except on grounds of national security or public order.
Article 32:
Contracting States shall facilitate assimilation and naturalization of stateless persons.
Article 33:
Interpretation disputes between State parties to be finally referable to the International Court of Justice (ICJ)
Remaining Clauses:
Territorial application; federal clause; signature, ratification and entry into force.

== State parties ==
As of 2024, the United Nations, the depository of the convention, lists 99 parties to the Convention. One state, the Holy See, (Note: Holy See section: "The Convention will be applied in the form compatible with the special nature of the State of the Vatican City and without prejudice to the norms that grant access thereunto and sojourn therein.") has signed the convention as a non-member state but has not ratified it. The 99 parties are:

- Albania
- Algeria
- Angola
- Antigua and Barbuda
- Argentina
- Armenia
- Australia
- Austria
- Azerbaijan
- Barbados
- Belgium
- Belize
- Benin
- Bolivia
- Bosnia and Herzegovina
- Botswana
- Brazil
- Bulgaria
- Burkina Faso
- Chad
- Chile
- Colombia
- Congo
- Costa Rica
- Côte d'Ivoire
- Croatia
- Czech Republic
- Denmark
- Ecuador
- El Salvador
- Eswatini
- Fiji
- Finland
- France
- Gambia
- Georgia
- Germany
- Greece
- Guatemala
- Guinea
- Guinea-Bissau
- Haiti
- Honduras
- Hungary
- Iceland
- Ireland
- Israel
- Italy
- Kiribati
- Latvia
- Lesotho
- Liberia
- Libya
- Liechtenstein
- Lithuania
- Luxembourg
- Malawi
- Mali
- Malta
- Mexico
- Moldova
- Montenegro
- Mozambique
- Netherlands
- Nicaragua
- Niger
- Nigeria
- North Macedonia
- Norway
- Panama
- Paraguay
- Peru
- Philippines
- Portugal
- Sao Tome and Principe
- South Korea
- Romania
- Rwanda
- Senegal
- Serbia
- Sierra Leone
- Slovakia
- Slovenia
- Spain
- Saint Vincent and the Grenadines
- South Sudan
- Sweden
- Switzerland
- Togo
- Turkey
- Trinidad and Tobago
- Tunisia
- Turkmenistan
- Uganda
- Ukraine
- United Kingdom
- Uruguay
- Zambia
- Zimbabwe

Madagascar denounced its accession made in 1962, effective 2 April 1966. (Note: Endnotes section, note 6: By a notification received by the Secretary-General on 2 April 1965, the Government of Madagascar denounced the Convention; the denunciation took effect on 2 April 1966.) The United Kingdom extended the convention to British Hong Kong, and China has declared that the convention continues to apply to Hong Kong post-1997. (Note: Endnotes section, note 3:... Upon resuming the exercise of sovereignty over Hong Kong, China notified the Secretary-General that the Convention will also apply to the Hong Kong Special Administrative Region. In addition, the notification made by the Government of China contained the following declaration: The Government of the People's Republic of China cannot undertake that effect will be given in the Hong Kong Special Administrative Region to article 25, paragraphs 1 and 2 of the Convention, and can only undertake that the provisions of paragraph 3 of the said article will be applied in the Hong Kong Special Administrative Region so far as the law there allows. Within the above ambit, responsibility for the international rights and obligations of a Party to the [said Convention] will be assumed by the Government of the People's Republic of China.)

== See also ==
- 1954 Convention Travel Document
- 1961 Convention on the Reduction of Statelessness

== Notes ==
- From the "Declarations and Reservations" of the Treaty Status in December 2023 for the Convention relating to the Status of Stateless Persons. 28 September 1954. United Nations: New York:
