= Alagirsky =

Alagirsky (masculine), Alagirskaya (feminine), or Alagirskoye (neuter) may refer to:

- Alagirsky District, a district of the Republic of North Ossetia-Alania, Russia
- Alagirskoye Urban Settlement, a municipal formation which Alagir Town Under District Jurisdiction in Alagirsky District of the Republic of North Ossetia-Alania is incorporated as
