= Internal border control =

Measures taken to regulate the movement of goods and people across internal borders

Controls imposed on internal borders within a single state or territory include measures taken by governments to monitor and regulate the movement of people, animals, and goods across land, air, and maritime borders through border controls.

== Background ==
Internal border controls are measures implemented to control the flow of people or goods within a given country. Such measures take a variety of forms ranging from the imposition of border checkpoints to the issuance of internal travel documents and vary depending on the circumstances in which they are implemented. Circumstances resulting in internal border controls include increasing security around border areas (e.g. internal checkpoints in America or Bhutan near border regions), preserving the autonomy of autonomous or minority areas (e.g. border controls between Peninsular Malaysia, Sabah, and Sarawak; border controls between Hong Kong, Macau, and mainland China), preventing unrest between ethnic groups (e.g. Northern Ireland's peace walls, border controls in Tibet and Northeastern India), and disputes between rival governments (e.g. between the Republic of China and the People's Republic of China).

During the COVID-19 pandemic, temporary internal border controls were introduced in jurisdictions across the globe. For instance, travel between Australian states and territories was prohibited or restricted by state governments at various points of the pandemic either in conjunction with sporadic lockdowns or as a stand-alone response to COVID-19 outbreaks in neighbouring states. Internal border controls were also introduced at various stages of Malaysia's Movement Control Order, per which interstate travel was restricted depending on the severity of ongoing outbreaks. Similarly, internal controls were introduced by national authorities within the Schengen Area, though the European Union ultimately rejected the idea of suspending the Schengen Agreement per se.

== Examples ==
=== Asia ===
Internal border controls exist in many parts of Asia. For example, travellers visiting minority regions in India and China often require special permits to enter. (Note: In India, special permits are required to travel across much of the country's north-east and requirements may vary within a given state. Special provisions are occasionally made for individuals from Bhutan or Nepal proceeding to or from their home country. Additionally, individuals arriving in the Andaman and Nicobar Islands from elsewhere in India receive passport stamps (see gallery at end of the section), even though only foreigners are typically subject to permit requirements.)

==== India ====
Permits issued for minority regions in India include:

- Restricted Area Permits and Protected Area Permits for foreigners in portions of north-eastern India and the Andaman and Nicobar Islands
- Inner Line Permits for Indian citizens

==== China ====
In the Tibet Autonomous Region (Tibetan: བོད་རང་སྐྱོང་ལྗོངས།; Chinese: 西藏自治区), two categories of permits are issued:

- The Tibet Travel Permits (Chinese: 外国人入藏函 foreigners' entrance letter) required for all foreigners (as well as Taiwanese nationals from the Republic of China) to enter the region
- The Alien Travel Permit required for holders of the Tibet Travel Permit to travel outside major urban and tourist areas of the region
- The Military Permit (or Border Permit) is required for travel to Ngari (Tibetan: མངའ་རིས་ས་ཁུལ་; Chinese: 阿里), Nyingchi (Tibetan: ཉིང་ཁྲི་ས།; Chinese: 林芝), and Nagqu (Tibetan: ནག་ཆུ།; Chinese: 那曲)

Additionally, special permits are issued to nationals of India and Bhutan for religious pilgrimages to Hindu and Buddhist holy sites in the Tibet Autonomous Region. Internal air and rail travel within non-autonomous portions of India and mainland China also generally require travel documents to be checked by government officials as a form of the interior border checkpoint. For such travel within India, Indian citizens may utilise their Voter ID, National Identity Card, passport, or other proof of Indian citizenship whilst Nepali nationals may present any similar proof of Nepali citizenship. Meanwhile, for such travel within mainland China, Chinese nationals from the mainland are required to use their national identity cards.

Within China, extensive border controls are maintained for those travelling between the mainland, special administrative regions of Hong Kong and Macau. Foreign nationals need to present their passports or other required types of travel documents when travelling between these jurisdictions. For Chinese nationals (including those with British National (Overseas) status), there are special documents (Note: For example, Hong Kong Permanent Identity Card or Macau Identity Card and Home Return Permit (simplified Chinese: 回乡证; traditional Chinese: 回鄉證; pinyin: Huíxiāngzhèng) are required for Hong Kong or Macau Permanent Residents who are Chinese citizens to cross the border, whilst mainlanders require a Two-Way Permit (Chinese: 双程证).) for travel between these territories. Internal border controls in China have also resulted in the creation of special permits allowing Chinese citizens to immigrate to or reside in other immigration areas within the country. (Note: The following documents are currently issued for this purpose: For mainlanders emigrating to either of the two Special Administrative Regions, authorities in the mainland issue the One Way Travel Permit (Chinese: 单程证; pinyin: Dānchéngzhèng). As the policy is designed to curtail emigration from the mainland rather than immigration to either SAR, issuance is exclusively the responsibility of authorities on the mainland.; Since September 2018, authorities in the mainland have issued the Residence Permit for Hong Kong, Macao, and Taiwan Residents (Chinese: 港澳台居民居住证; pinyin: Gǎng-Aò-Tái Jūmín Jūzhùzhèng) authorising Chinese citizens from Hong Kong, Macau, and Taiwanese nationals to reside in the mainland. The permit is designed to resemble the national identity card issued to individuals with household registration on the mainland and enables holders to access public and private sector services that require a national identity card number.)

China also maintains distinct, relaxed border control policies in the Special Economic Zones of Shenzhen, Zhuhai and Xiamen. Nationals of most countries (Note: Nationals of the following countries are ineligible for the SEZ visa: Afghanistan; Algeria; Bahrain; Cameroon; Egypt; Iran; Iraq; Jordan; Kuwait; Lebanon; Liberia; Libya; Morocco; Oman; Pakistan; Palestine; Saudi Arabia; Somalia; Sri Lanka; Sudan; Syria; Turkey; Uganda; Yemen) can obtain a limited area visa upon arrival in these regions, which permit them to stay within these cities without proceeding further into other parts of Mainland China. Visas for Shenzhen are valid for 5 days, and visas for Xiamen and Zhuhai are valid for 3 days. The duration of stay starts from the next day of arrival. The visa can only be obtained only upon arrival at Luohu Port, Huanggang Port Control Point, Fuyong Ferry Terminal or Shekou Passenger Terminal for Shenzhen; Gongbei Port of Entry, Hengqin Port or Jiuzhou Port for Zhuhai; and Xiamen Gaoqi International Airport for Xiamen.

Similarly, China permits nationals of non—visa-exempt ASEAN countries (Note: Non-visa-exempt ASEAN countries are: Cambodia; Indonesia; Laos; Malaysia; Myanmar; Philippines; Thailand; Vietnam) to visit Guilin without a visa for a maximum of 6 days if they travel with an approved tour group and enter China from Guilin Liangjiang International Airport. They may not visit other cities within Guangxi or other parts of Mainland China.

Neither the People's Republic of China nor the Republic of China recognizes the passports issued by the other and neither considers travel between mainland China and areas controlled by the Republic of China (Note: The area under the definition consists of: Taiwan (Chinese: 台灣); Penghu (Chinese: 澎湖); Kinmen (Chinese: 金門; pinyin: Jīnmén); Matsu Islands (Chinese: 馬祖列島; pinyin: Mǎzǔ Lièdǎo); Other nearby islands) as formal international travel. There are arrangements exist for travel between territories controlled by the Republic of China and territories controlled by the People's Republic of China. (Note: Documents required for travel between the PRC and ROC are: The Mainland Travel Permit for Taiwan Residents (simplified Chinese: 台胞证; traditional Chinese: 臺胞證; pinyin: Táibāozhèng) issued by the PRC for entry to the mainland, which is also valid but not mandatory for entry to Hong Kong and Macau; The Taiwan Entry Permit (Chinese: 入臺證; pinyin: Rùtáizhèngg) issued to mainlanders by the ROC; The Kinmen-Matsu Permit (traditional Chinese: 金馬證; simplified Chinese: 金马证; pinyin: JīnMǎ zhèng; Pe̍h-ōe-jī: Kim-Má-chèng) issued to residents of Kinmen and Matsu (ROC-administered territories in Fujian as well as Penghu for travel to and from the mainland.)

More generally, authorities in mainland China maintain a system of residency registration known as hukou (Chinese: 户口; lit. 'household individual'), by which government permission is needed to formally change one's place of residence. It is enforced with identity cards. This system of internal border control measures effectively limited internal migration before the 1980s but subsequent market reforms caused it to collapse as a means of migration control. An estimated 150 to 200 million people are part of the "blind flow" and have unofficially migrated, generally from poor, rural areas to wealthy, urban ones. However, unofficial residents are often denied official services such as education and medical care and are sometimes subject to both social and political discrimination. In essence, the denial of social services outside an individual's registered area of residence functions as an internal border control measure geared toward dissuading migration within the mainland.

==== Bhutan ====
Meanwhile, in Bhutan, a microstate accessible by road only through India, there are interior border checkpoints (primarily on the Lateral Road) and, additionally, certain areas require special permits to enter, whilst visitors not proceeding beyond the border city of Phuentsholing do not need permits to enter for the day (although such visitors are de facto subject to Indian visa policy since they must proceed through Jaigaon). Individuals who are not citizens of India, Bangladesh, or the Maldives must obtain both their visa and any regional permits required through a licensed tour operator prior to arriving in the country. Citizens of India, Bangladesh, and the Maldives may apply for regional permits for restricted areas online.

==== Vietnam ====
The Hộ khẩu system in Vietnam is similar to the Hukou system in mainland China. Local authorities issue each household a "household registration book" or sổ hộ khẩu, in which the basic biographical information of each household member is recorded. The sổ hộ khẩu is the ultimate legal proof of residence in Vietnam. Together with the "citizen identification card" or giấy chứng minh nhân dân/căn cước công dân, the sổ hộ khẩu constitutes the most important legal identification document in Vietnam. Modelled after the Chinese hukou system and originally used in urban areas only, hộ khẩu functioned as a way to manage urban growth and limit how many people moved, as well as who moved in and out of the cities. Gradually, the system became a universal method of control as its application expanded to the countryside. Presently, the system defines four types of residence, KT1 through KT4. KT1 is the primary and permanent type of residence and denotes a person's primary residential address. People moving on a semi-permanent basis to another place within the same province or national municipality (within Saigon, for example) need to register for a KT2 residential status at that new address. If this same move happens across provincial borders, then the person has to sign up for a KT3 registration. For migrant workers and students temporarily residing outside of their province or national municipality of permanent residence, they need to apply for a KT4 registration. Navigating this matrix of regulations is tough. But the public security apparatus that manages the hộ khẩu system is also difficult to deal with, especially if one is a poor migrant worker with little to no formal education. Yet hộ khẩu remains absolutely crucial, especially for the poor. It is tied to access to welfare benefits, and, in the case of children, the right to attend public school. For a migrant family in Saigon with no KT3 or KT4 registration, subsidised medical care, poverty assistance, and almost-free schooling are all out of reach. Much like its counterpart in mainland China, the denial of services outside an individual's place of registered residence resulting from this system of internal border control serves to dissuade internal migration.

==== Malaysia ====
The Malaysian states of Sabah and Sarawak, have maintained their own border controls since joining Malaysia in 1963. The internal border control is asymmetrical; while Sabah and Sarawak impose immigration control on Malaysian citizens from other states, there is no corresponding border control in Peninsular Malaysia, and Malaysians from Sabah and Sarawak have unrestricted right to live and work in the Peninsular. For social and business visits less than three months, Malaysian citizens may travel between the Peninsular, Sabah and Sarawak using the Malaysian identity card (MyKad) or Malaysian passport, while for longer stays in Sabah and Sarawak they are required to have an Internal Travel Document or a passport with the appropriate residential permit.

==== North Korea ====
The most restrictive internal border controls are in North Korea. Citizens are not allowed to travel outside their areas of residence without explicit authorisation, and access to the capital city of Pyongyang is heavily restricted. Similar restrictions are imposed on tourists, who are only allowed to leave Pyongyang on government-authorised tours to approved tourist sites.

==== Israel ====
The Israeli military maintains an intricate network of internal border controls within Israeli and Palestinian territory restricting the freedom of movement of Palestinians, composed of permanent, temporary, and random manned checkpoints in the West Bank; the West Bank Barrier; and restrictions on the usage of roads by Palestinians. Spread throughout the State of Israel and the areas of the State of Palestine under de facto Israeli control, internal border control measures are a key feature of Israeli and Palestinian life and are among the most restrictive in the world. Additionally, the blockade of the Gaza Strip results in a de facto domestic customs and immigration border for Palestinians. In order to clear internal border controls, Palestinians are required to obtain a variety of permits from Israeli authorities depending on the purpose and area of their travel. The legality and impact of this network of internal border controls is controversial. B'Tselem, an Israeli non-governmental organisation that monitors human rights in Palestine, argues that they breach the rights guaranteed by the International Covenant on Economic, Social and Cultural Rights—in particular, the right to a livelihood, the right to an acceptable standard of living, the right to satisfactory nutrition, clothing, and housing, and the right to attain the best standard of physical and mental health. B'Tselem also argues that the restrictions on ill, wounded and pregnant Palestinians seeking acute medical care is in contravention of international law that states that medical professionals and the sick must be granted open passage. While Israeli Supreme Court has deemed the measures acceptable for security reasons, Haaretz's Amira Hass argues this policy defies one of the principles of the Oslo Accords, which states that Gaza and the West Bank constitute a single geographic unit.

==== Gallery ====
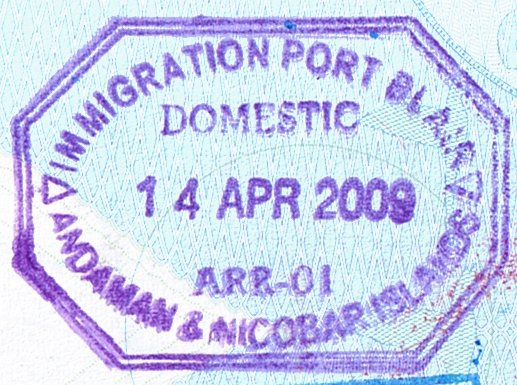
Domestic Immigration stamp permitting entry into the Andaman and Nicobar Islands in India.

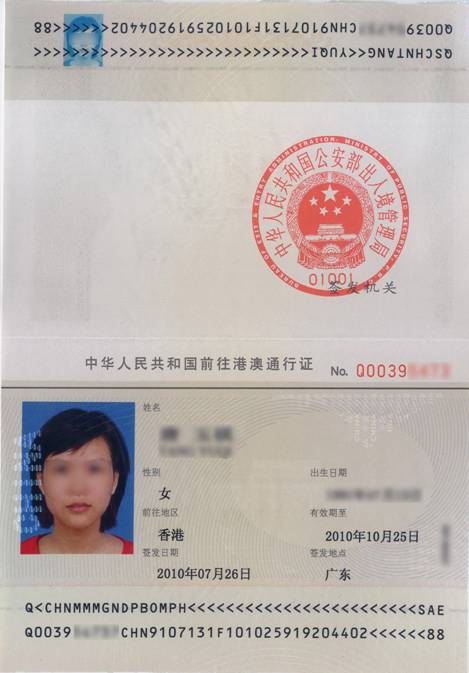
Sample of a One Way Travel Permit for internal emigration from mainland China to Hong Kong or Macau.

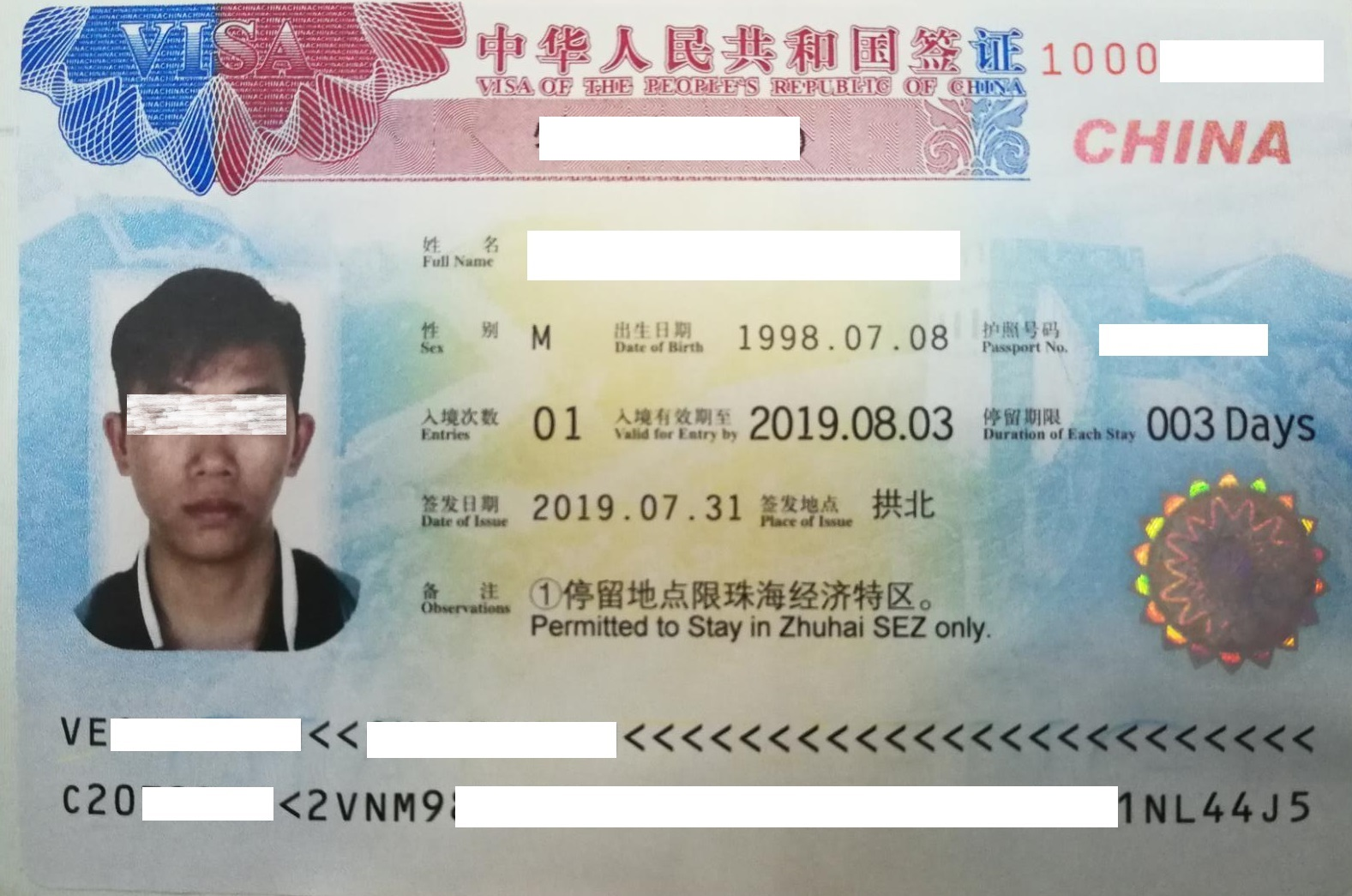
Sample of a Special Economic Zone visa issued on arrival in China

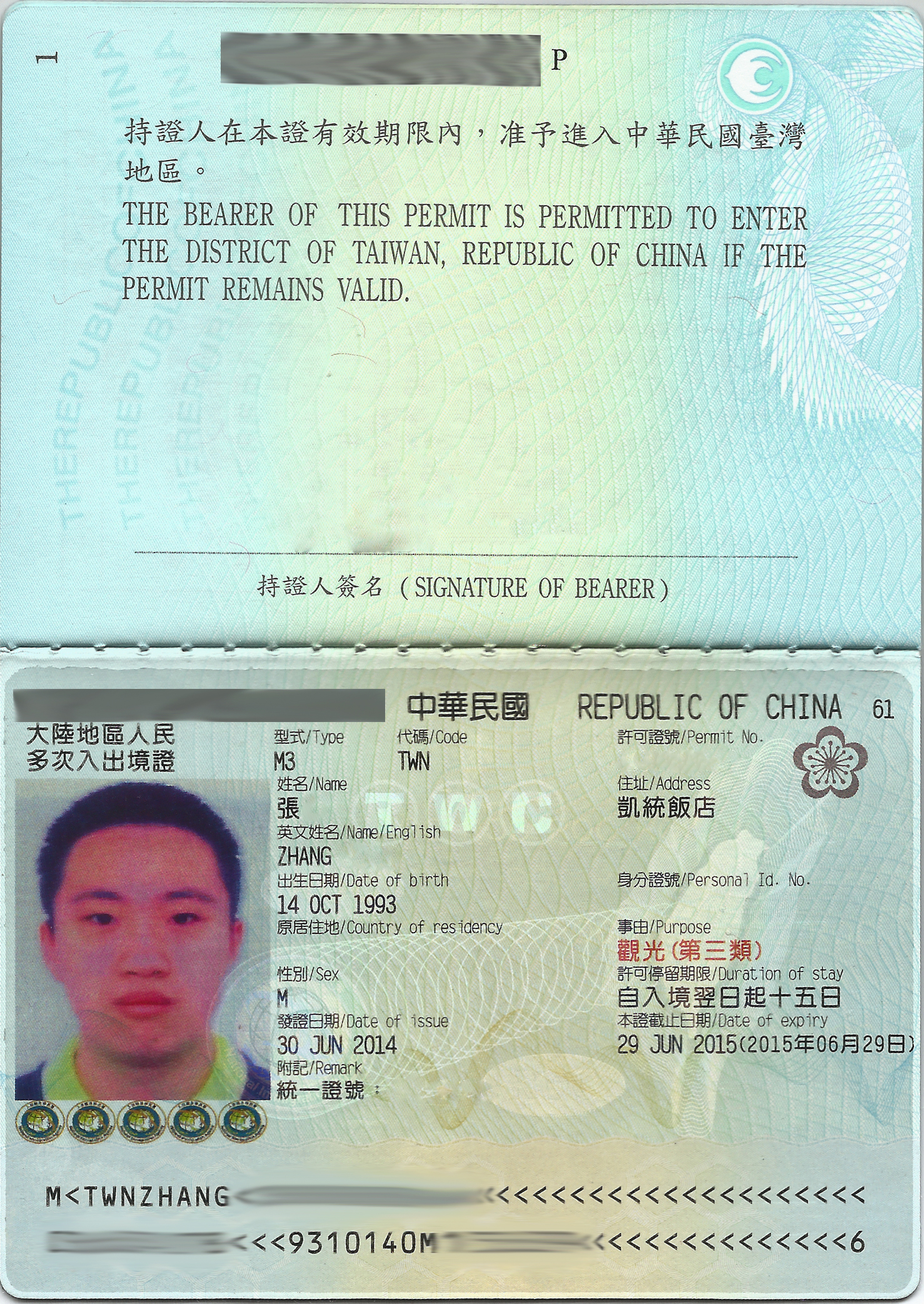
Data page of a booklet type internal travel document issued by Taiwan authorities to a Mainland Chinese resident.

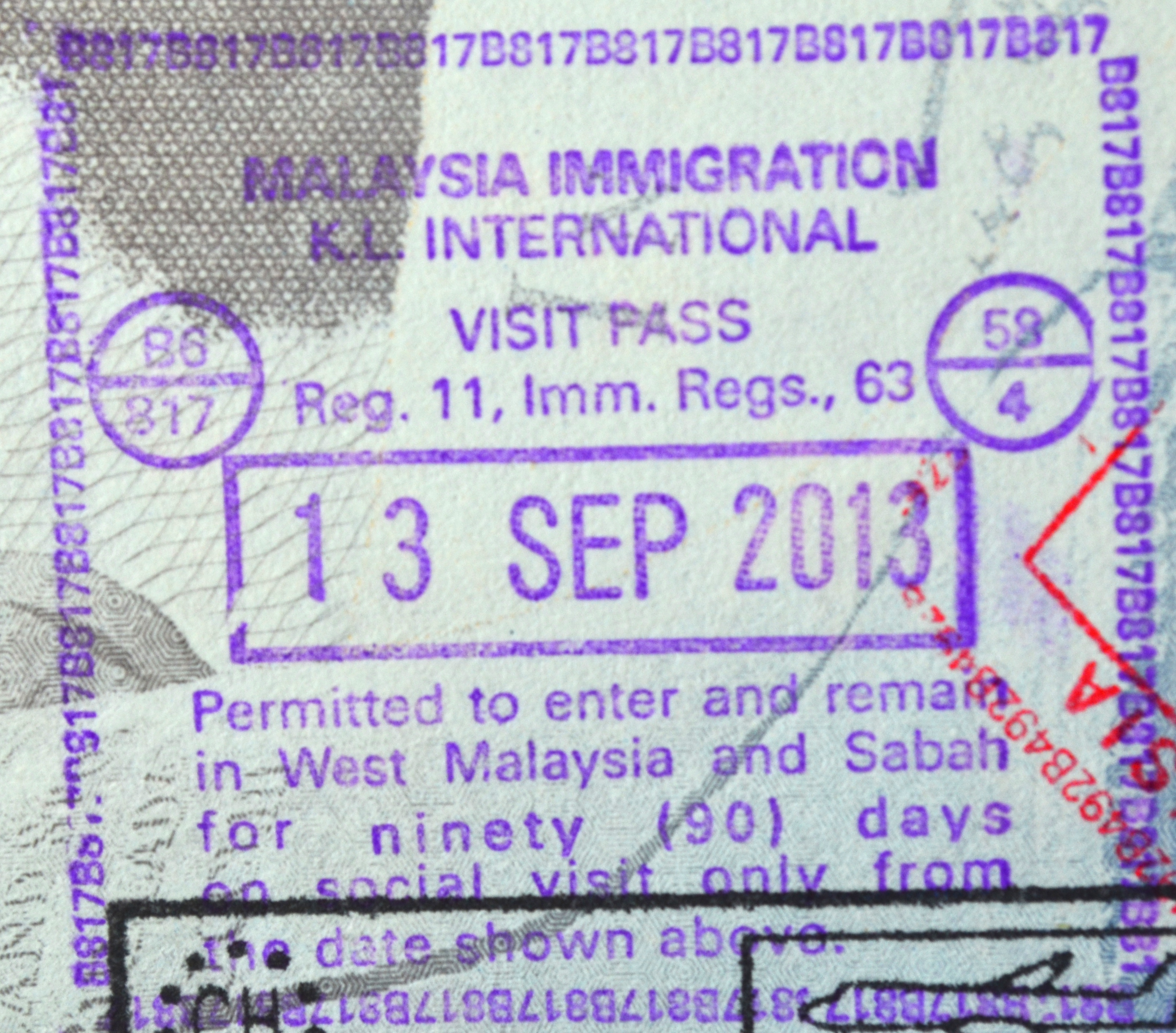
Malaysian entry stamps specify which jurisdictions (i.e. West or Peninsular Malaysia, Sabah, and Sarawak) the bearer is permitted to enter, and there are immigration checks when entering each.

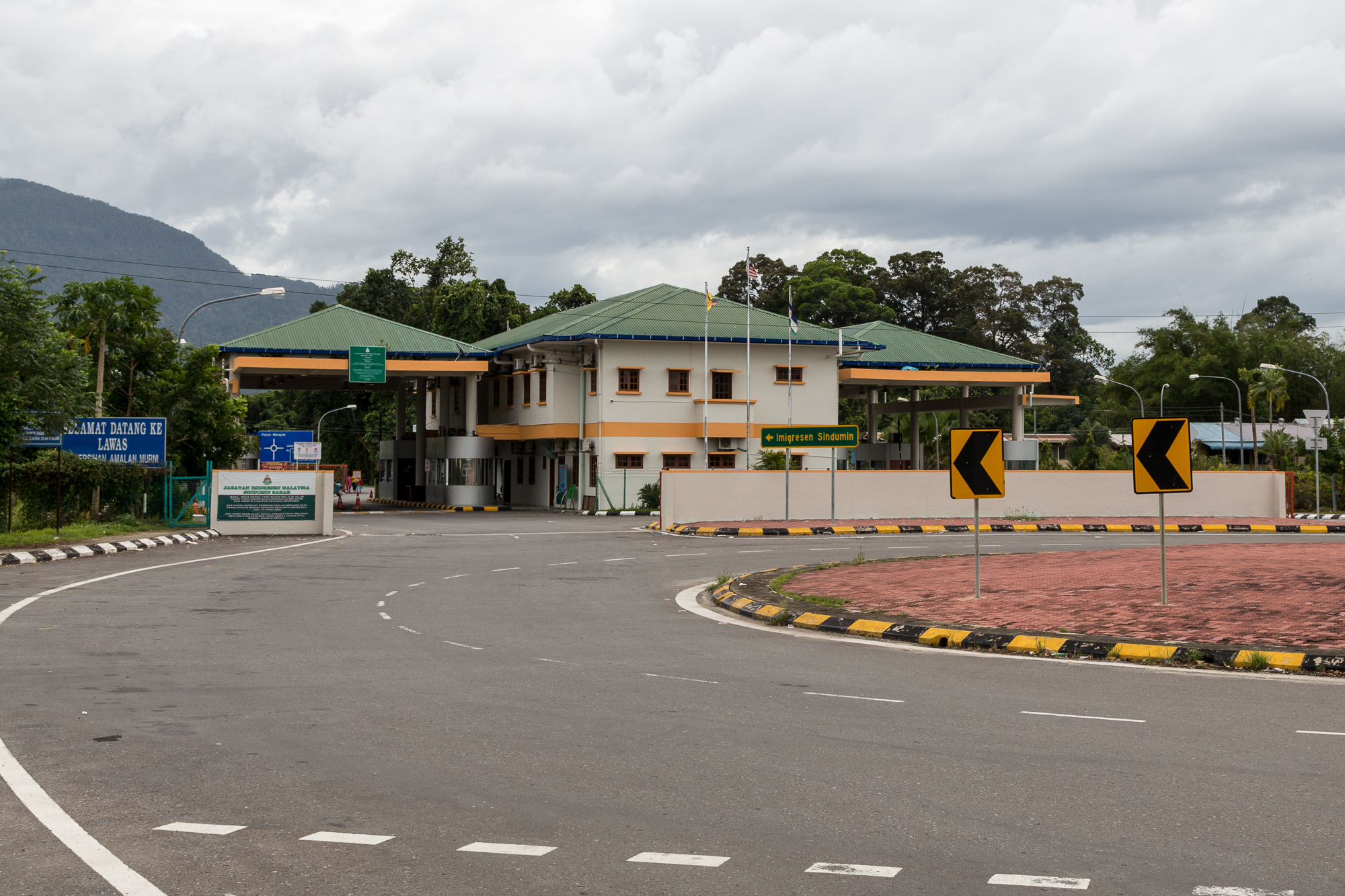
The internal border checkpoint between Sabah and Sarawak, located at Sindumin.

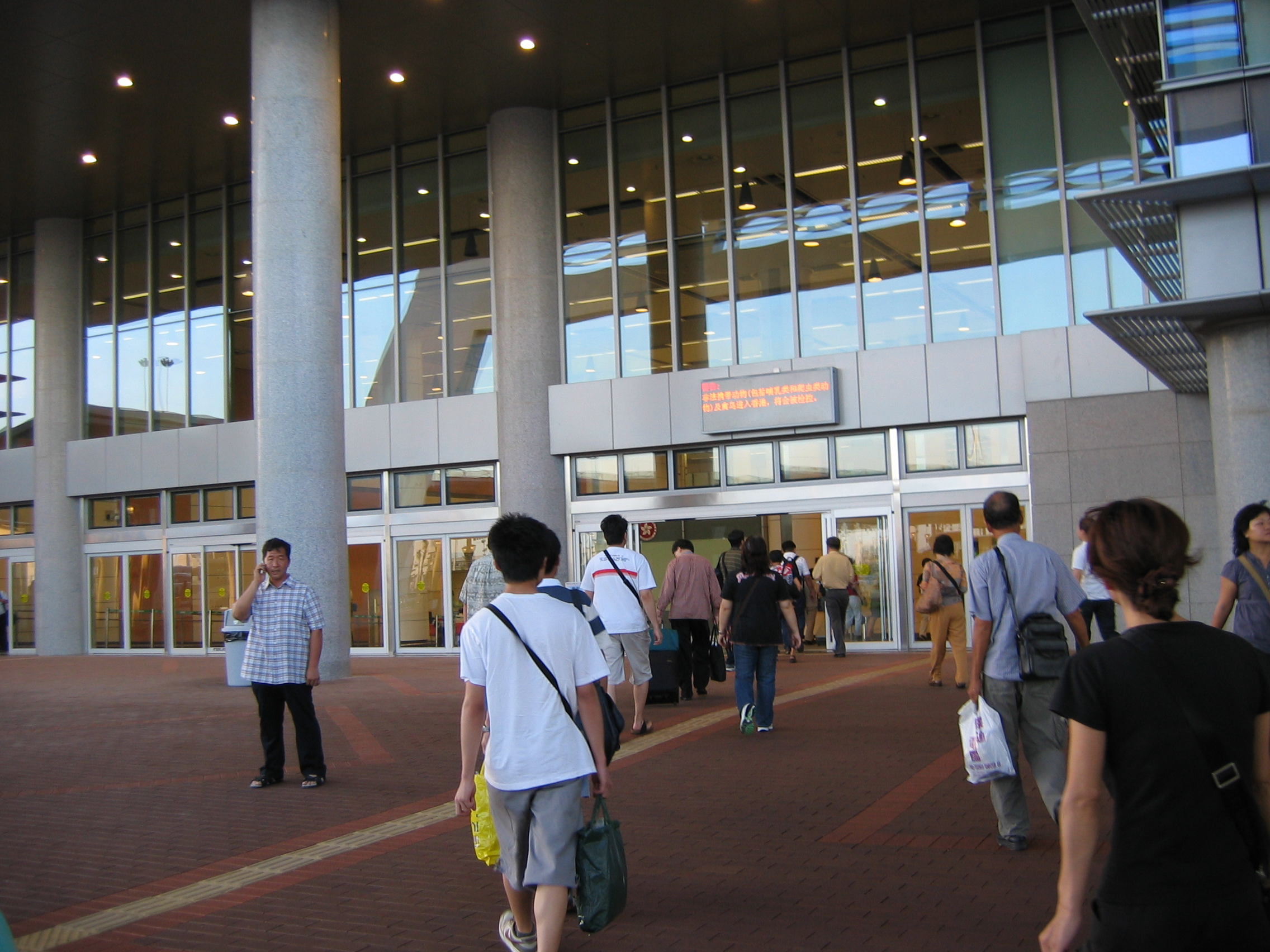
The entrance to the building of the Shenzhen Bay Control Point, an internal border checkpoint between Hong Kong and mainland China

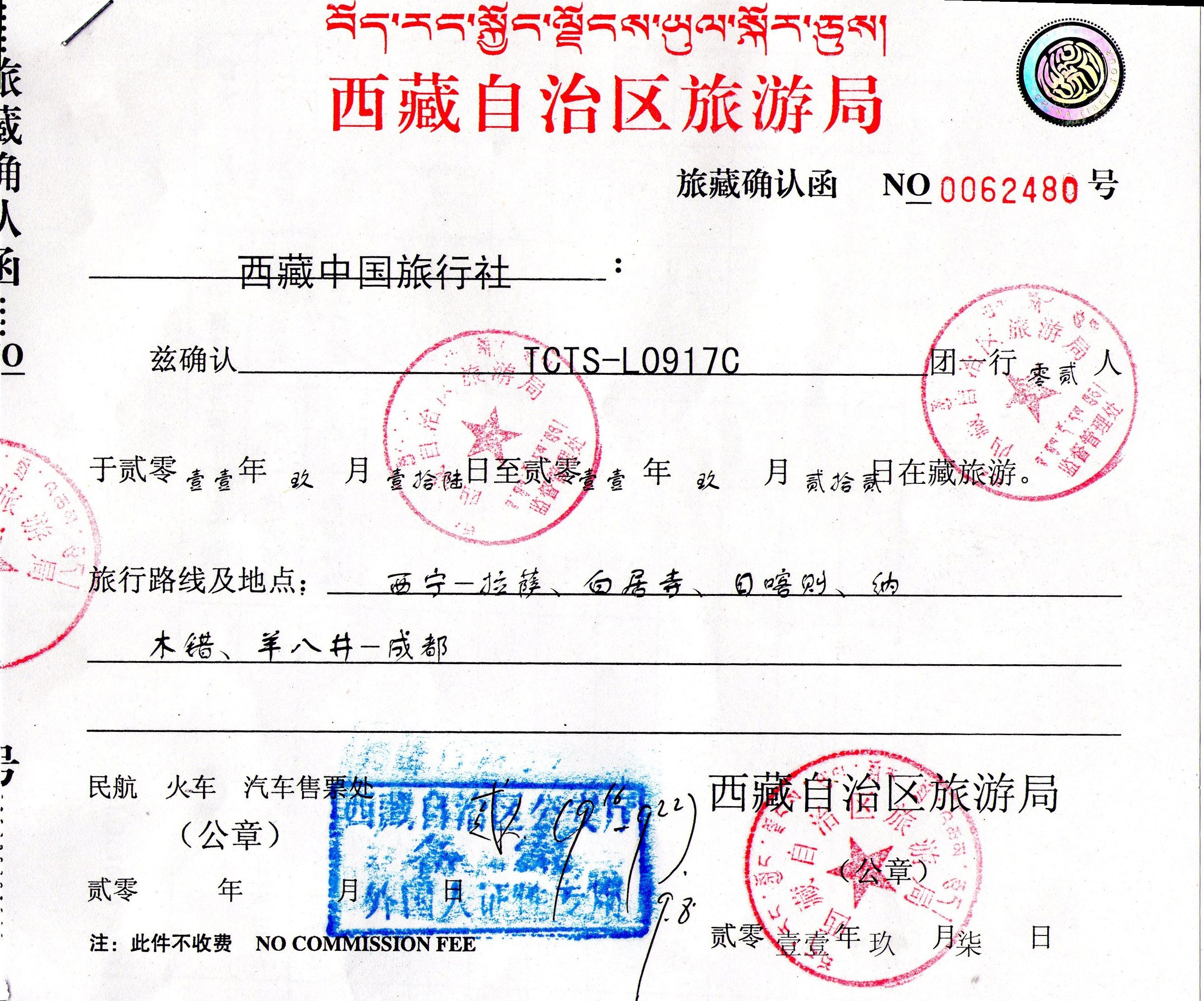
The Tibet Travel Permit, required to enter the Tibet Autonomous Region, is an example of internal border controls in minority regions of China and India. Other similar documents include Restricted Area Permits and Protected Area permits primarily issued to enter India's northeast.

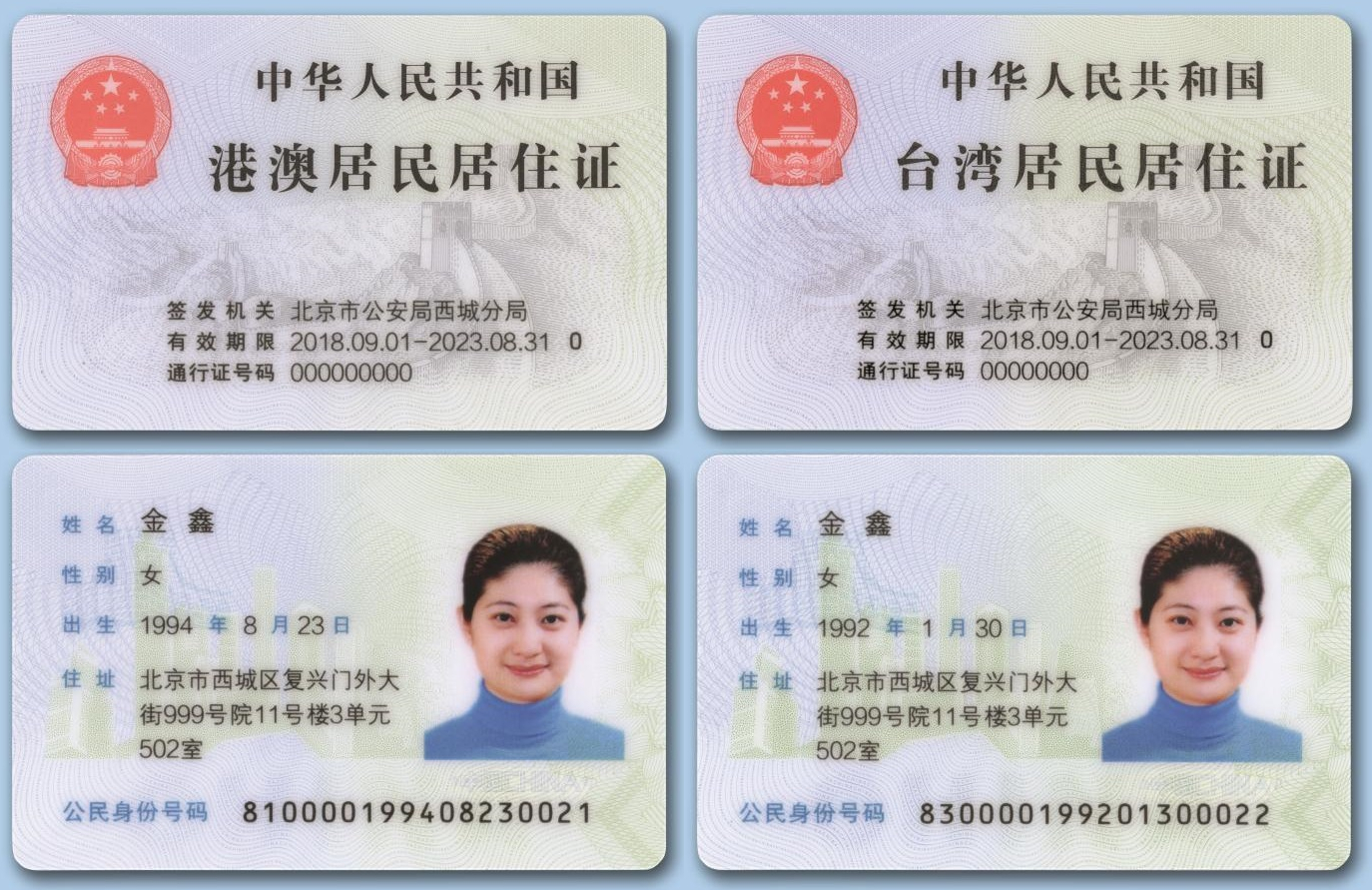
Front and back of mainland residence permits for Chinese citizens from Hong Kong and Macau (left) and Taiwanese nationals from areas administered by the Republic of China (right)

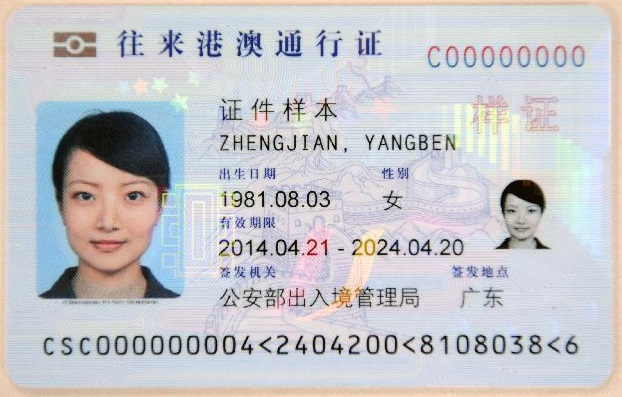
Internal travel document issued to Chinese citizens from the mainland for travel to and from Hong Kong and Macau

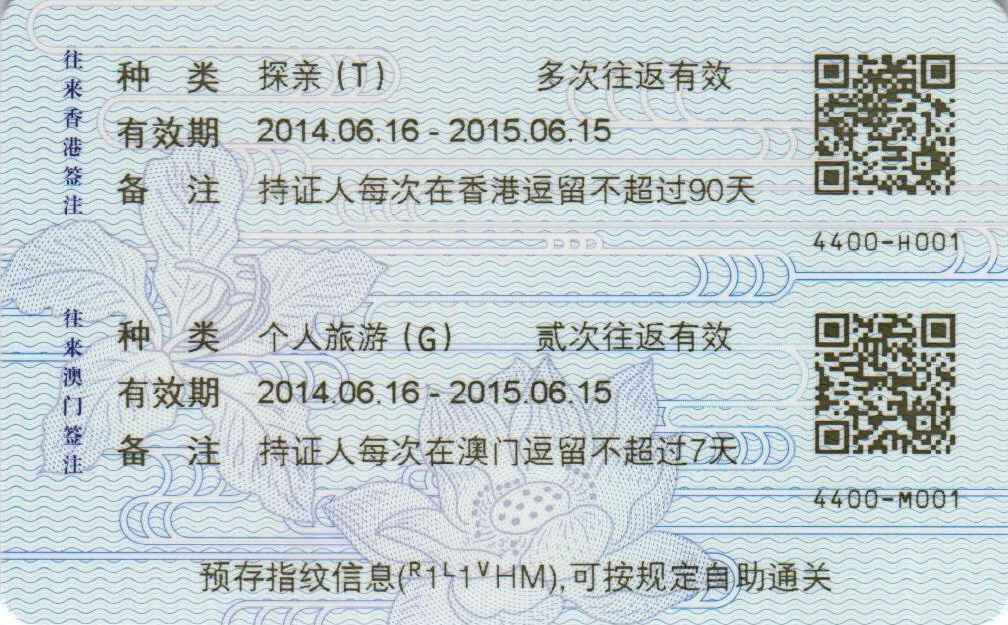
Exit endorsements affixed to the back of an internal travel document issued to Chinese citizens from the mainland for travel to and from Hong Kong or Macau

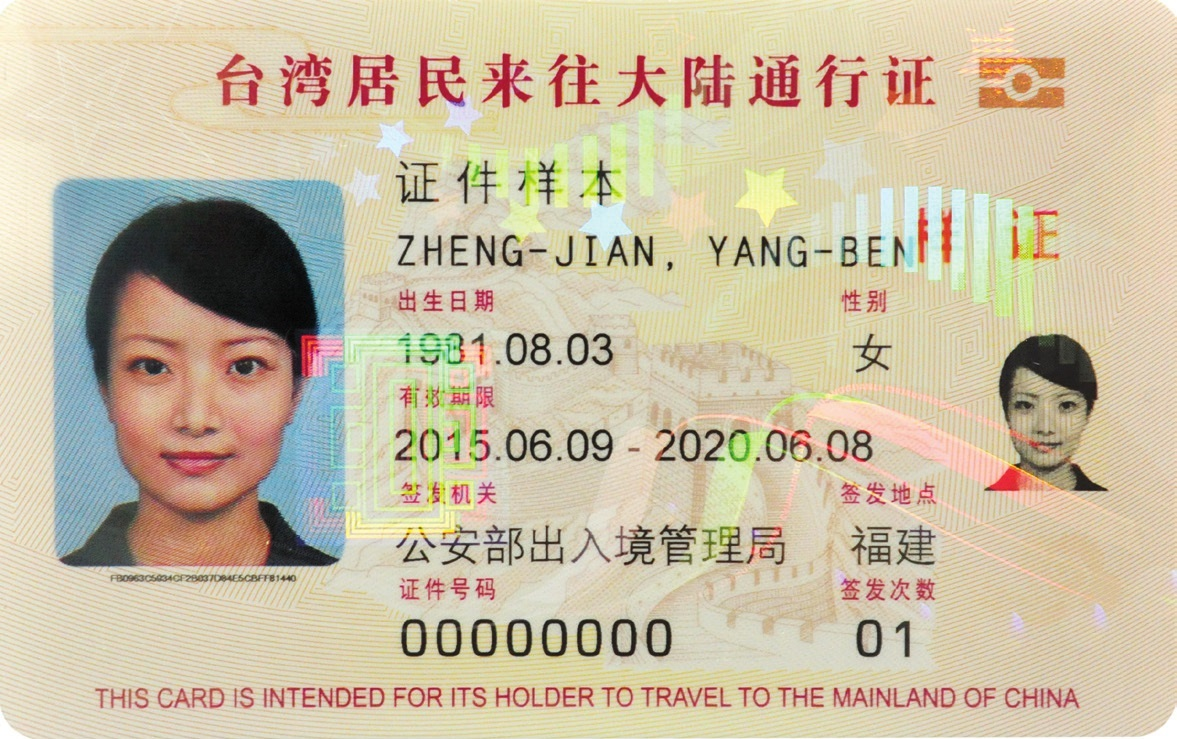
An Internal travel document issued to Taiwanese nationals from areas administered by the Republic of China to travel to and from the mainland

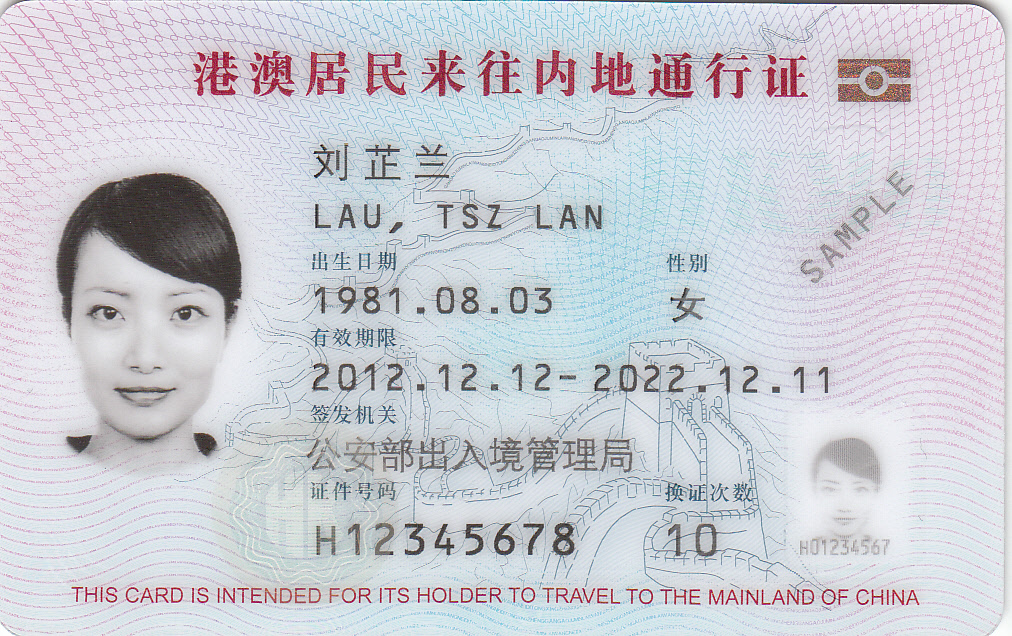
Internal travel document for Chinese citizens of Hong Kong or Macau to enter the mainland.

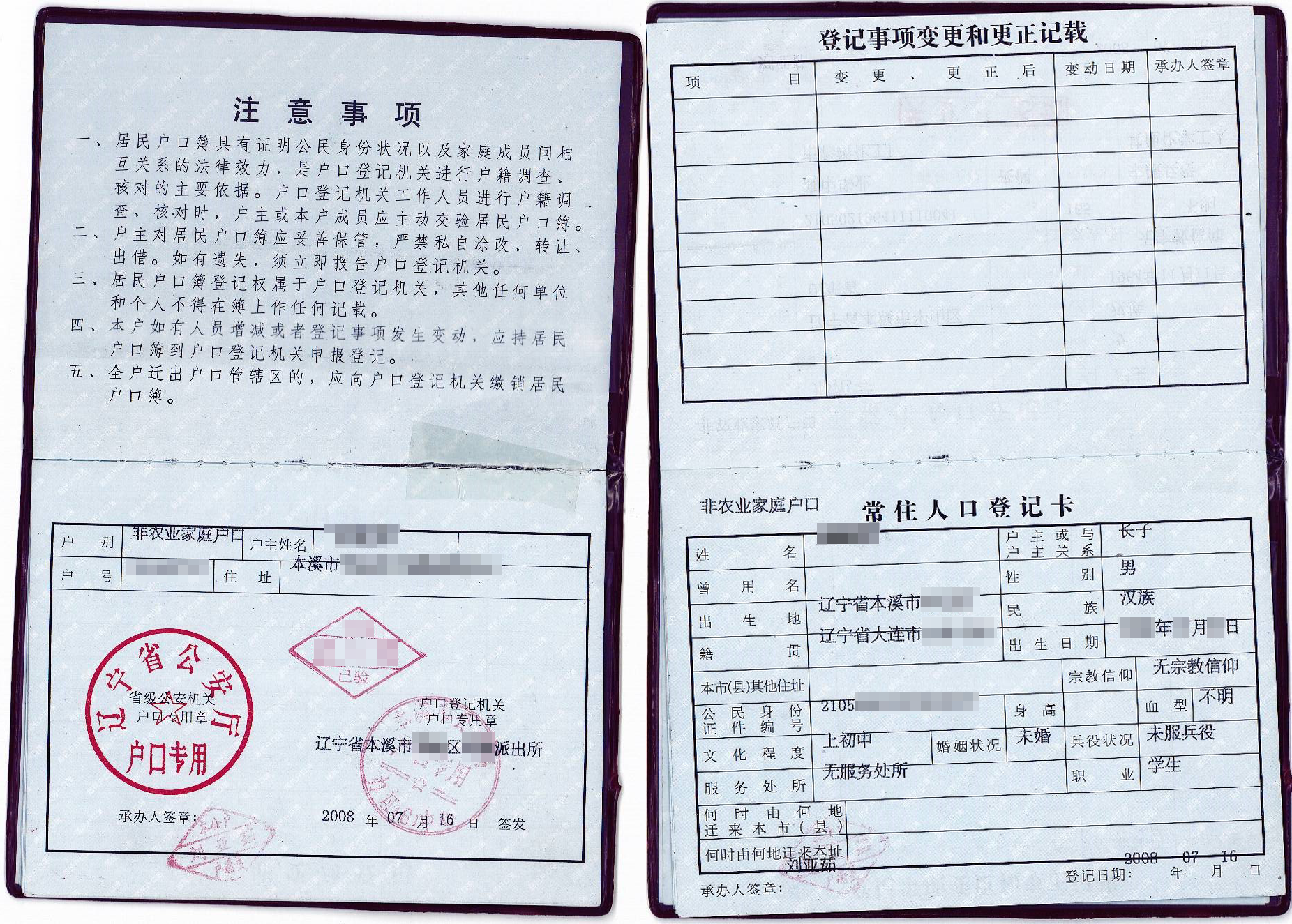
The inside pages of hukou booklet in China.

=== Europe ===
An example from Europe is the implementation of border controls on travel between Svalbard, which maintains a policy of free migration as a result of the Svalbard Treaty and the Schengen Area, which includes the rest of Norway. Other examples of effective internal border controls in Europe include the closed cities of certain CIS members, areas of Turkmenistan that require special permits to enter, restrictions on travel to the Gorno-Badakhshan Autonomous Region in Tajikistan, and (depending on whether Northern and Southern Cyprus are considered separate countries) the Cypriot border. Similarly, Iraq's Kurdistan region maintains a separate and more liberal visa and customs area from the rest of the country, even allowing visa free entry for Israelis whilst the rest of the country bans them from entering. Denmark also maintains a complex system of subnational countries which, unlike the Danish mainland, are outside the European Union and maintain autonomous customs policies. (Note: These are Greenland and the Faroe Islands. These areas do not maintain strict immigration controls with the Schengen Area, but border controls are sporadically enforced for customs purposes.) In addition to the numerous closed cities of Russia, parts of 19 subjects (Note: Chukotka Autonomous Okrug, all; In Leningrad Oblast – all Russian islands of Gulf of Finland, except Gogland, and 20-km strip along South coast of Gulf of Finland.; The Republic of North Ossetia-Alania, 85% of territory. Transit to border with Georgia and to border with South Ossetia are possible along the main roads. Tsey Gorge is opened for foreigners from 2012.; Part of Kaliningrad Oblast, approx. 15%.; Part of Moscow Oblast, approx. 10%.; Part of Arkhangelsk Oblast, include Novaya Zemlya, approx. 30%.; Part of Murmansk Oblast, approx. 15%. Transit to/from Norway is possible by main road.; Part of Kamchatka Krai.; Part of Primorsky Krai.) of the Russian Federation are closed for foreigners without special permits and are consequently subject to internal border controls.

==== United Kingdom ====
Another complex border control situation in Europe pertains to the United Kingdom. Whilst the crown dependencies are within the Common Travel Area, neither Gibraltar nor the sovereign British military exclaves of Akrotiri and Dhekelia are. The former maintains its own border control policies, thus requiring physical border security at its border with the Schengen Area as well as the implementation of border controls for travellers proceeding directly between Gibraltar and the British mainland. The latter maintains a relatively open border with Southern Cyprus, though not with Northern Cyprus. Consequently, it is a de facto member of the Schengen Area and travel to or from the British mainland requires border controls. On 31 December 2020, Spain and the United Kingdom reached an agreement in principle under which Gibraltar would join the Schengen Area, clearing the way for the European Union and the UK to start formal negotiations on the matter.

In the aftermath of Brexit, border controls for goods flowing between Great Britain and Northern Ireland were introduced in accordance with the Protocol on Ireland/Northern Ireland agreed to as part of the UK's withdrawal agreement with the EU. Due to the thirty-year internecine conflict in Northern Ireland, the UK-Ireland border has had a special status since that conflict was ended by the Belfast Agreement/Good Friday Agreement of 1998. As part of the Northern Ireland Peace Process, the border has been largely invisible, without any physical barrier or custom checks on its many crossing points; this arrangement was made possible by both countries' common membership of both the EU's Single Market and Customs Union and of their Common Travel Area. Upon the UK's withdrawal from the European Union, the border in Ireland became the only land border between the UK and EU. EU single market and UK internal market provisions require certain customs checks and trade controls at their external borders. The Northern Ireland Protocol is intended to protect the EU single market, while avoiding imposition of a 'hard border' that might incite a recurrence of conflict and destabilise the relative peace that has held since the end of the Troubles. Under the Protocol, Northern Ireland is formally outside the EU single market, but EU free movement of goods rules and EU Customs Union rules still apply; this ensures there are no customs checks or controls between Northern Ireland and the rest of the island. In place of an Ireland/Northern Ireland land border, the protocol has created a de facto customs border down the Irish Sea for customs purposes, separating Northern Ireland from the island of Great Britain, to the disquiet of prominent Unionists. To operate the terms of the protocol, the United Kingdom must provide border control posts at Northern Ireland's ports: actual provision of these facilities is the responsibility of Northern Ireland's Department of Agriculture, Environment and Rural Affairs (DAERA). Temporary buildings were put in place for 1 January 2021, but in February 2021, the responsible Northern Ireland minister, Gordon Lyons (DUP), ordered officials to stop work on new permanent facilities and to stop recruiting staff for them. In its half yearly financial report 26 August 2021, Irish Continental Group, which operates ferries between Great Britain and the Republic of Ireland, expressed concern at the lack of implementation of checks on goods arriving into Northern Ireland from Great Britain, as required under the protocol. The company said that the continued absence of these checks (on goods destined for the Republic of Ireland) is causing a distortion in the level playing field, since goods that arrive directly into Republic of Ireland ports from Great Britain are checked on arrival. The implementation of border controls between Great Britain and Northern Ireland was the primary catalyst for the 2021 Northern Ireland riots.

Peace lines

Much like relations between Jewish settlers in Israel and the native Palestinian population, strained intercommunal relations in Northern Ireland between Irish Catholics and the descendants of Protestant settlers from England and Scotland have resulted in de facto internal checkpoints. The peace lines are an internal border security measure to separate predominantly republican and nationalist Catholic neighbourhoods from predominantly loyalist and unionist Protestant neighbourhoods. They have been in place in some form or another since the end of The Troubles in 1998, with the Good Friday Agreement. The majority of peace walls are located in Belfast, but they also exist in Derry, Portadown, and Lurgan, with more than 32 kilometres of walls in Northern Ireland. The peace lines range in length from a few hundred metres to over 5 kilometres. They may be made of iron, brick, steel or a combination of the three and are up to 8 metres high. Some have gates in them (sometimes staffed by police) that allow passage during daylight but are closed at night.

==== Schengen Area ====
An unusual example of internal border controls pertains to customs enforcement within the Schengen area. Even though borders are generally invisible, the existence of areas within the Schengen area but outside the European Union Value Added Tax Area, as well as jurisdictions such as Andorra which are not officially a part of the Schengen area but can not be accessed without passing through it, has resulted in the existence of sporadic internal border controls for customs purposes. Additionally, as per Schengen area rules, hotels and other types of commercial accommodation must register all foreign citizens, including citizens of other Schengen states, by requiring the completion of a registration form by their own hand. (Note: This does not apply to accompanying spouses and minor children or members of travel groups. In addition, a valid identification document has to be produced to the hotel manager or staff.) The Schengen rules do not require any other procedures; thus, the Schengen states are free to regulate further details on the content of the registration forms, and identity documents which are to be produced, and may also require the persons exempted from registration by Schengen laws to be registered. A Schengen state is also permitted to reinstate border controls with another Schengen country for a short period where there is a serious threat to that state's "public policy or internal security" or when the "control of an external border is no longer ensured due to exceptional circumstances". When such risks arise out of foreseeable events, the state in question must notify the European Commission in advance and consult with other Schengen states. Since the implementation of the Schengen Agreement, this provision has been invoked frequently by member states, especially in response to the European migrant crisis. (Note: For example, in April 2010, Malta introduced temporary checks due to Pope Benedict XVI's visit. It reimposed checks in 2015 in the weeks surrounding the Commonwealth Heads of Government Meeting. In response to the European migrant crisis, several countries set up internal controls. In 2019, Denmark, worried about the bombings in Sweden, introduced passport controls to Swedish citizens for the first time since the 1950s.)

==== Gallery ====
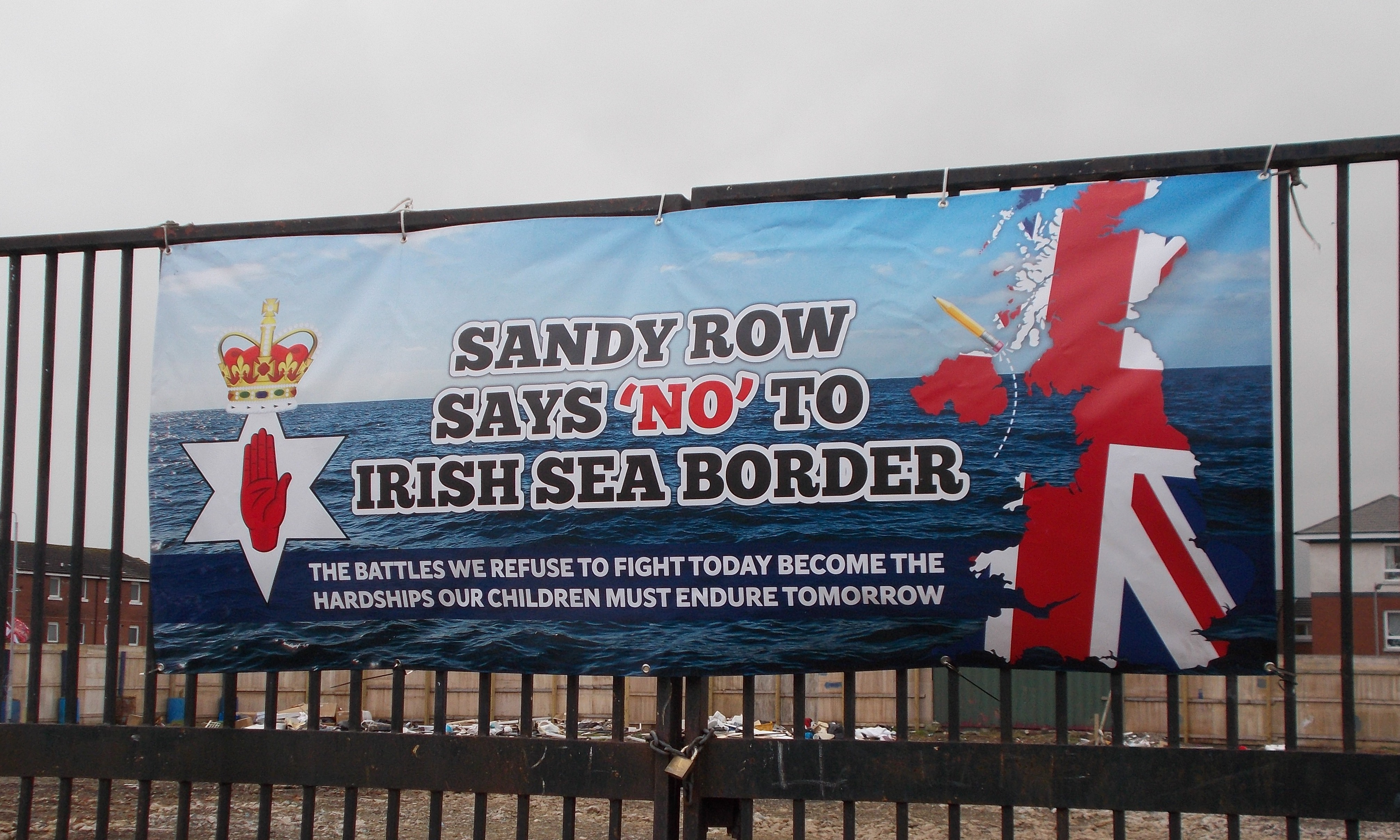
Banner opposing post-Brexit border controls between Great Britain and Northern Ireland seen in Sandy Row (March 2021)

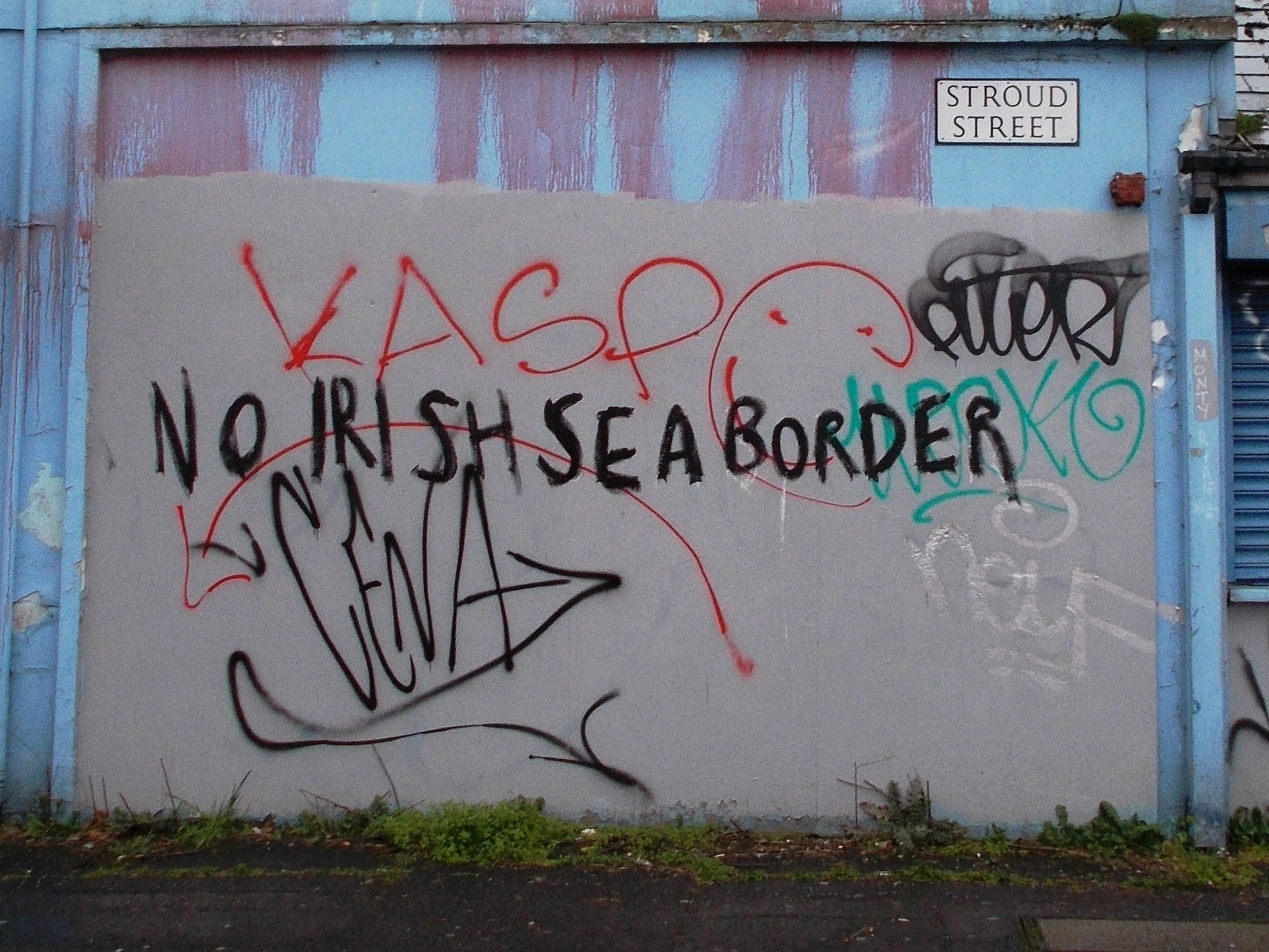
Graffiti in Belfast opposing an "Irish Sea border" (February 2021)

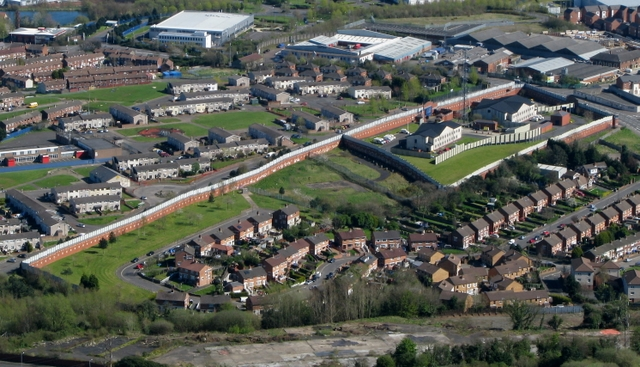
A 5.5m high peace line along Springmartin Road in Belfast, with a fortified police station at one end

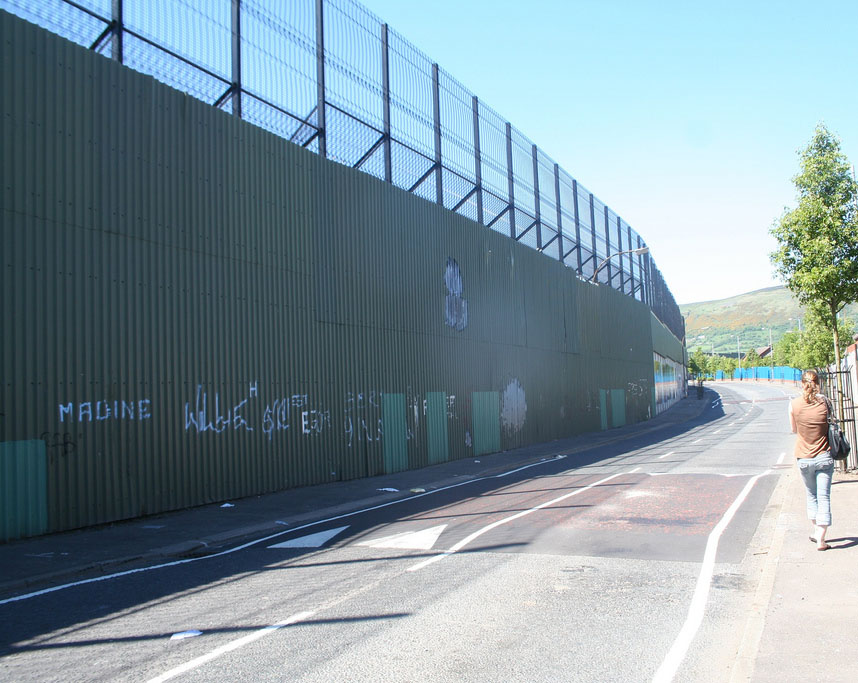
The peace line along Cupar Way in Belfast, seen from the predominantly Protestant side

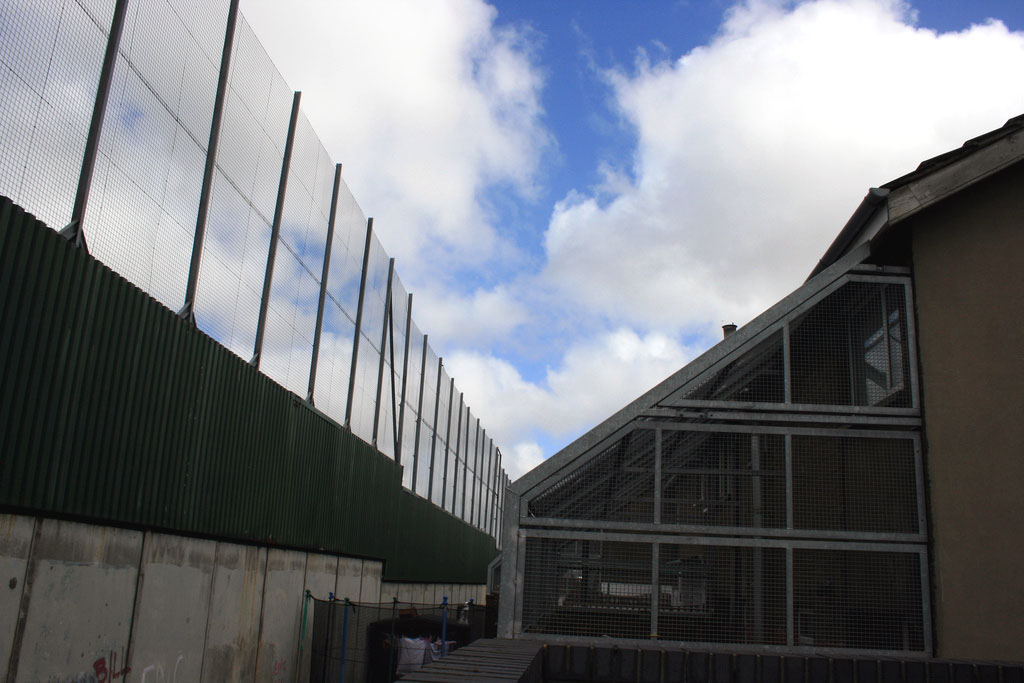
The peace line at Bombay Street/Cupar Way in Belfast, seen from the predominantly Catholic side

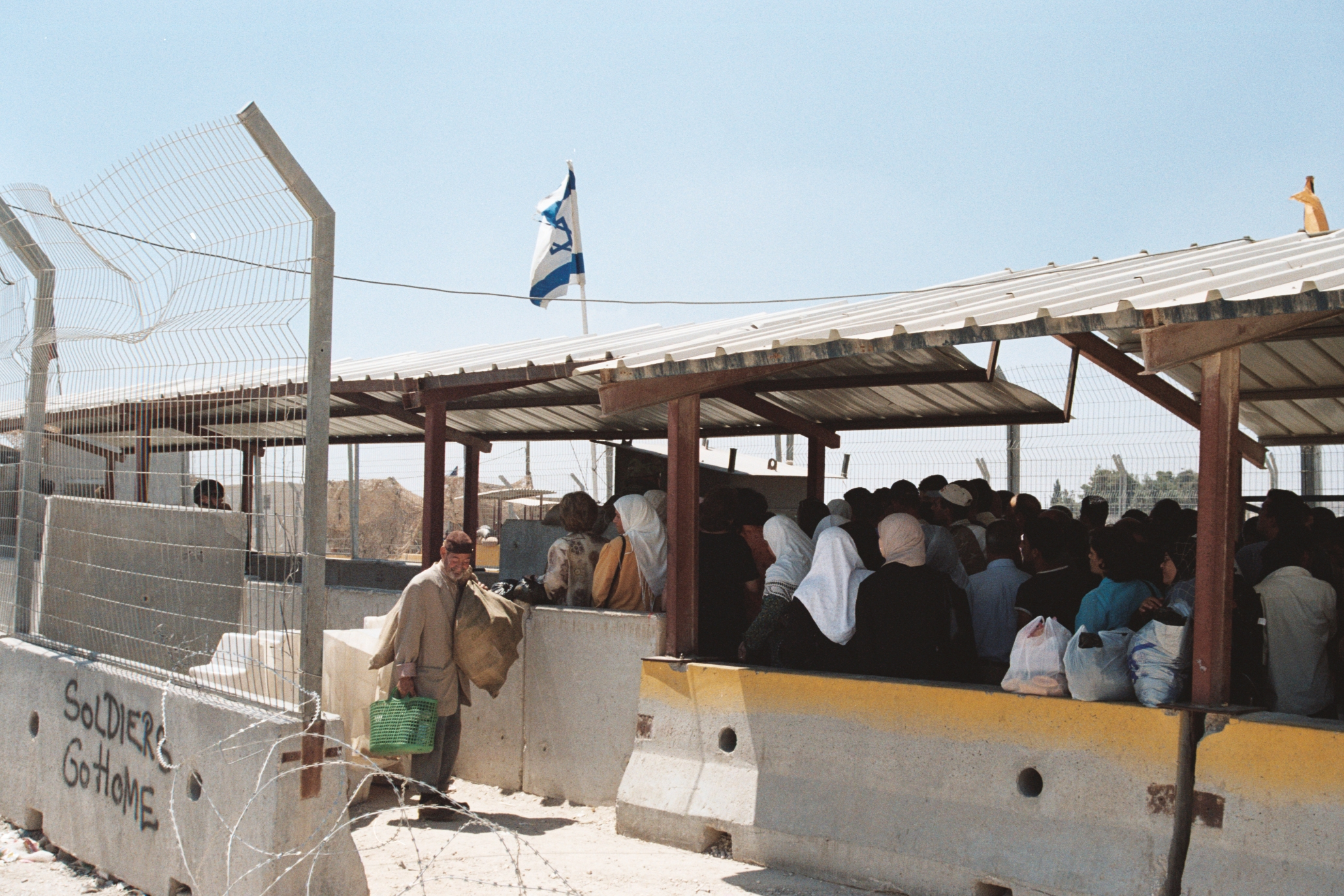
Israeli checkpoint outside the Palestinian city of Ramallah. August 2004

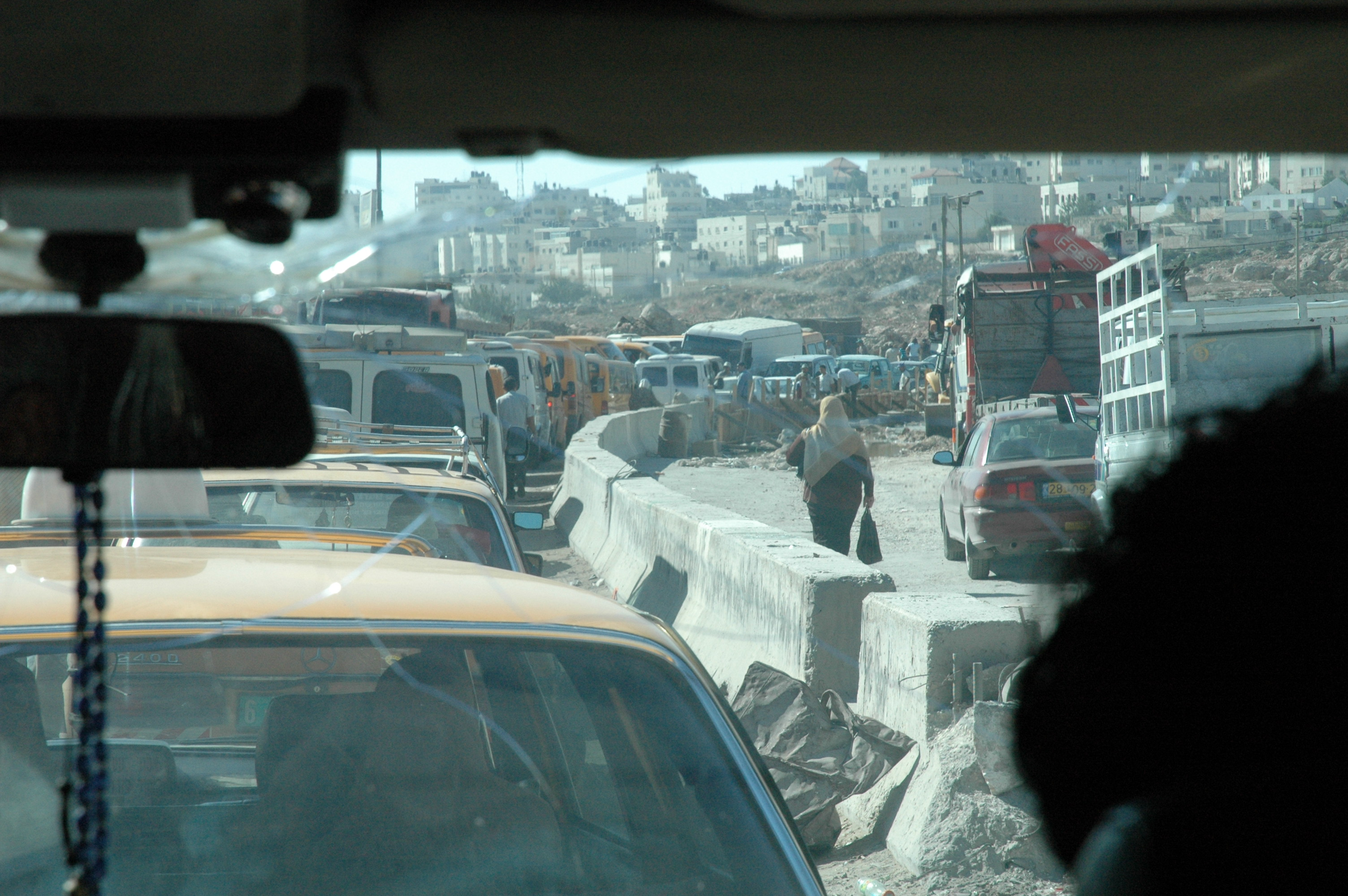
Vehicles queuing at Kalandia checkpoint in Palestine, August 2004

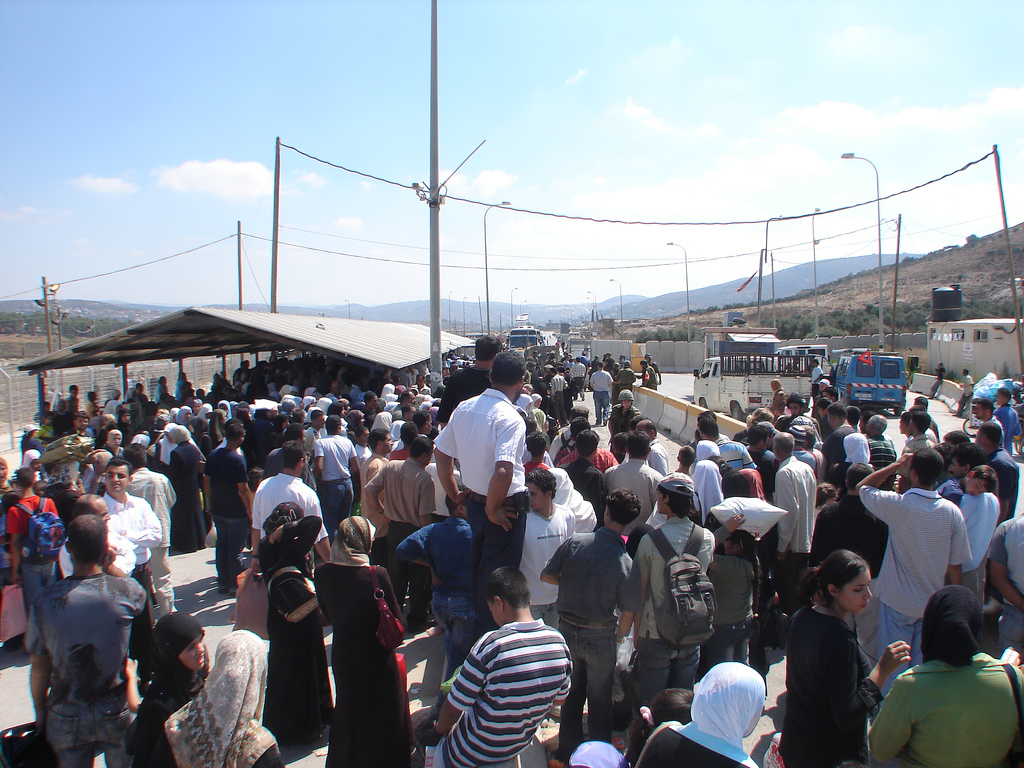
Huwwara checkpoint, south of the Palestinian city of Nablus.

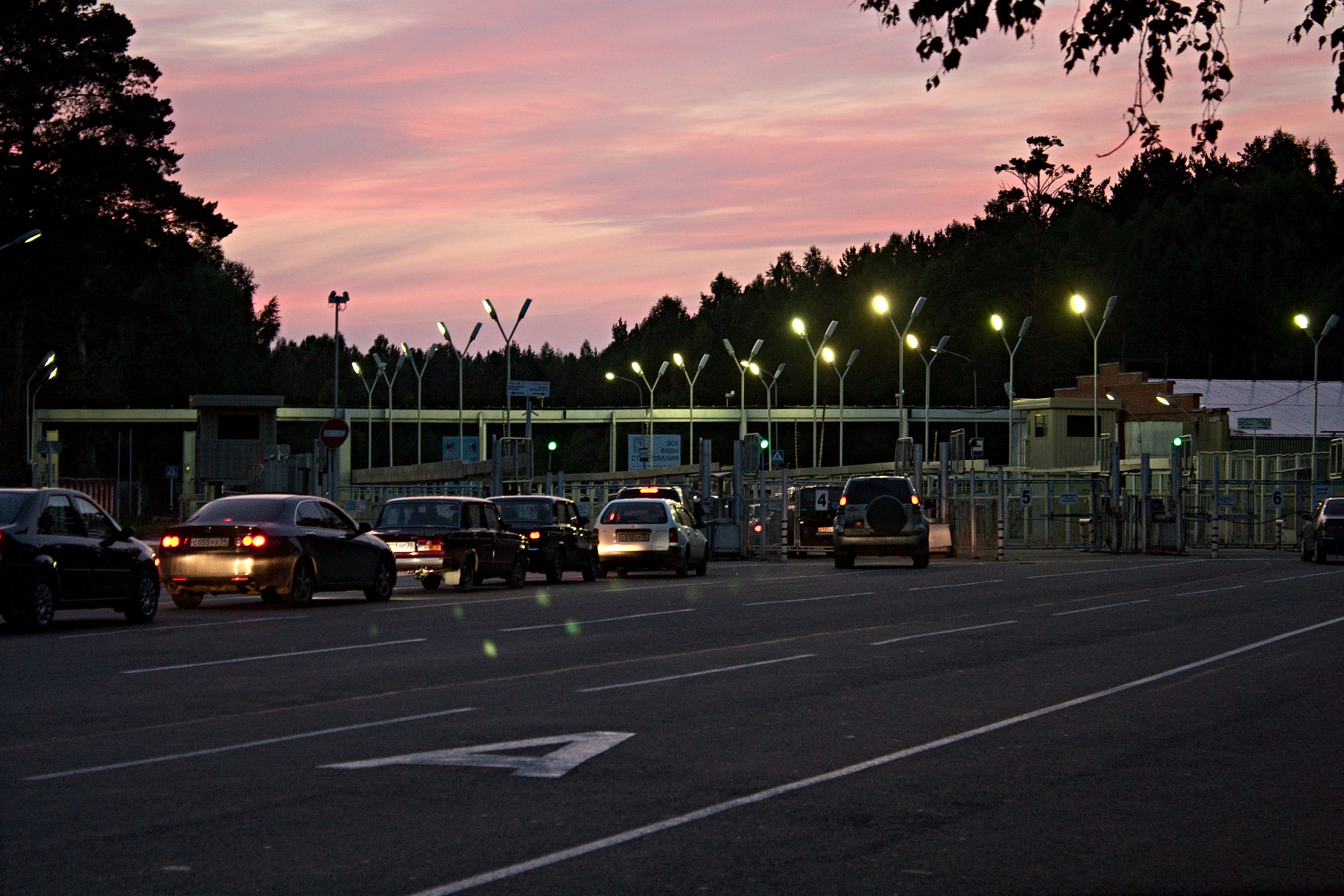
Central entry checkpoint to the closed city of Seversk, Tomsk Oblast, Russia.

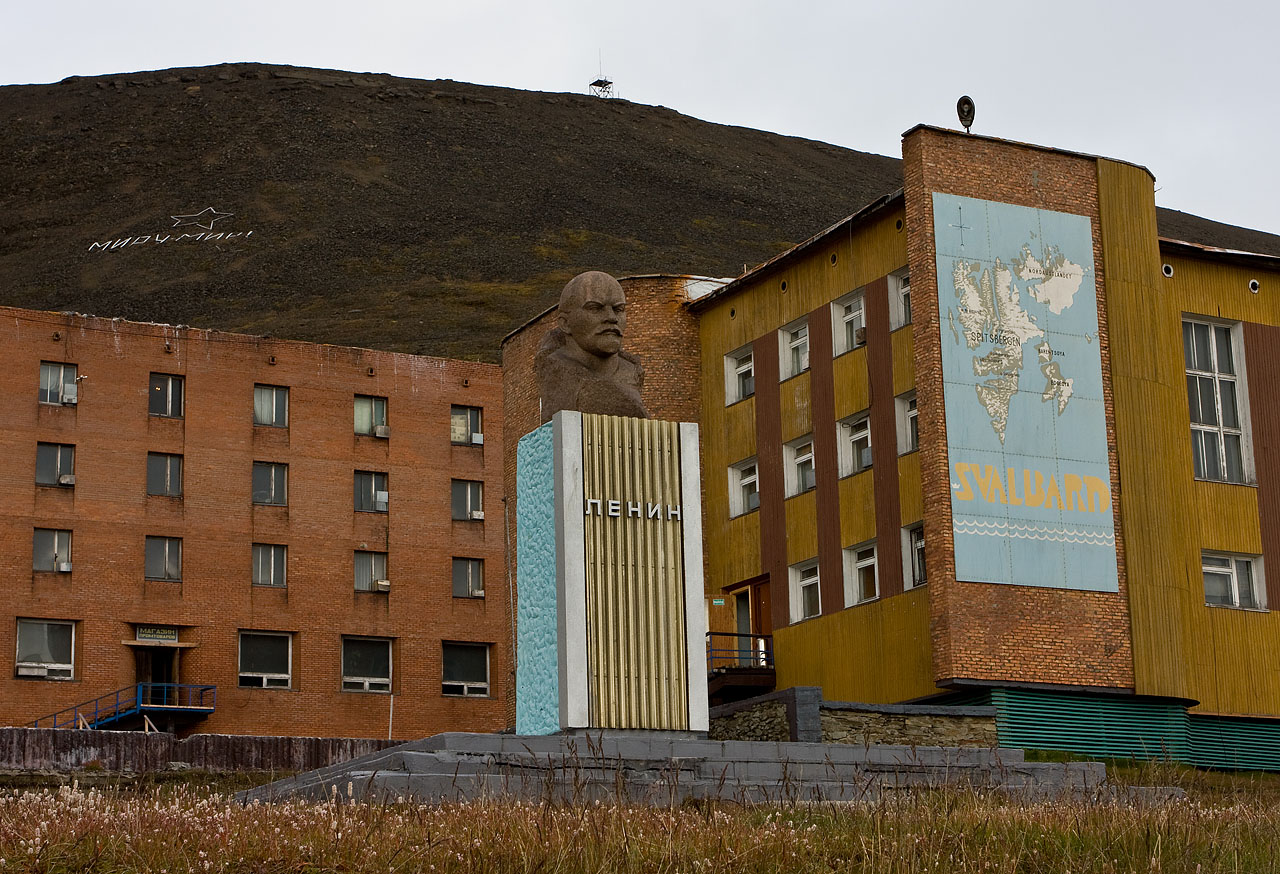
As a consequence of Svalbard's unique immigration status and exclusion from the rest of Norway for border control purposes, the city of Barentsburg is predominantly Russian and hosts the world's second northernmost statue of Lenin (the northernmost is in Pyramiden).

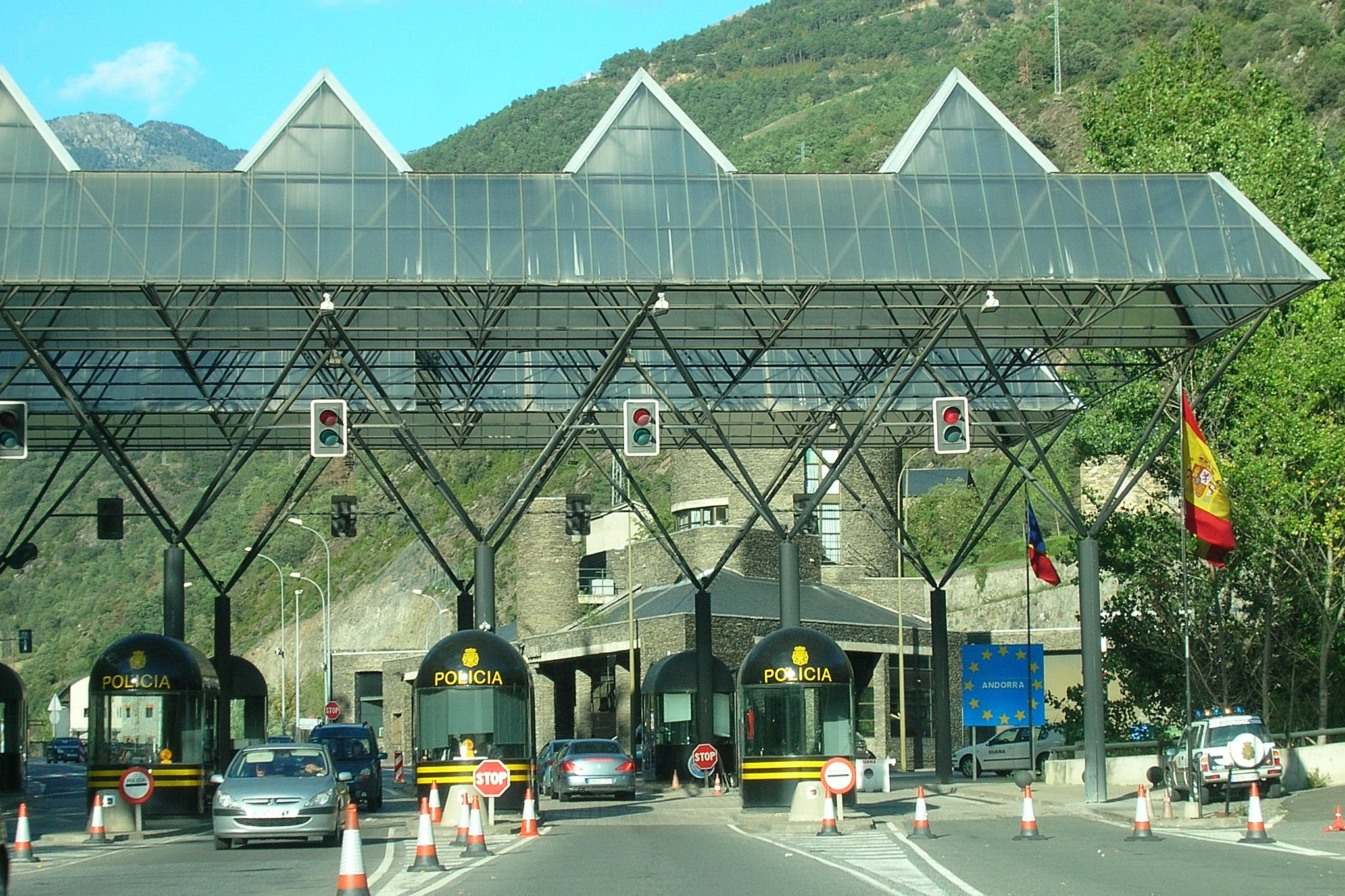
Border post between Spain and Andorra, a microstate that de facto follows Schengen immigration policies and utilises the Euro as its national currency yet is not a part of the European Union VAT and customs areas.

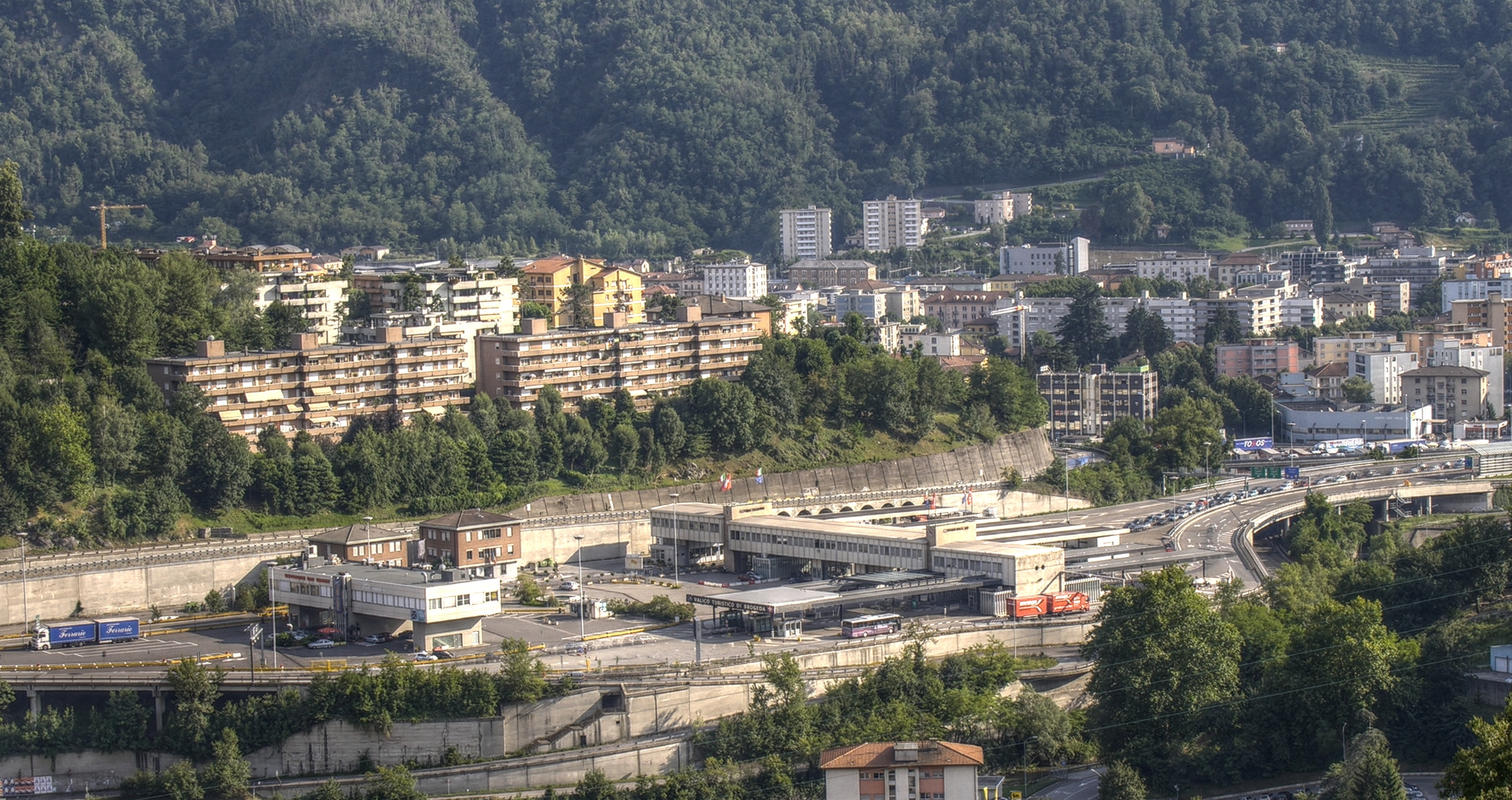
The Italy-Switzerland border is an internal Schengen border, but as seen at this border crossing at Chiasso, there are border control facilities since Switzerland maintains its own customs and tax area.

=== North America ===
==== Contemporary ====
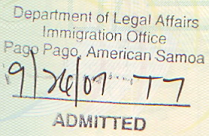
American Samoa entry stamp

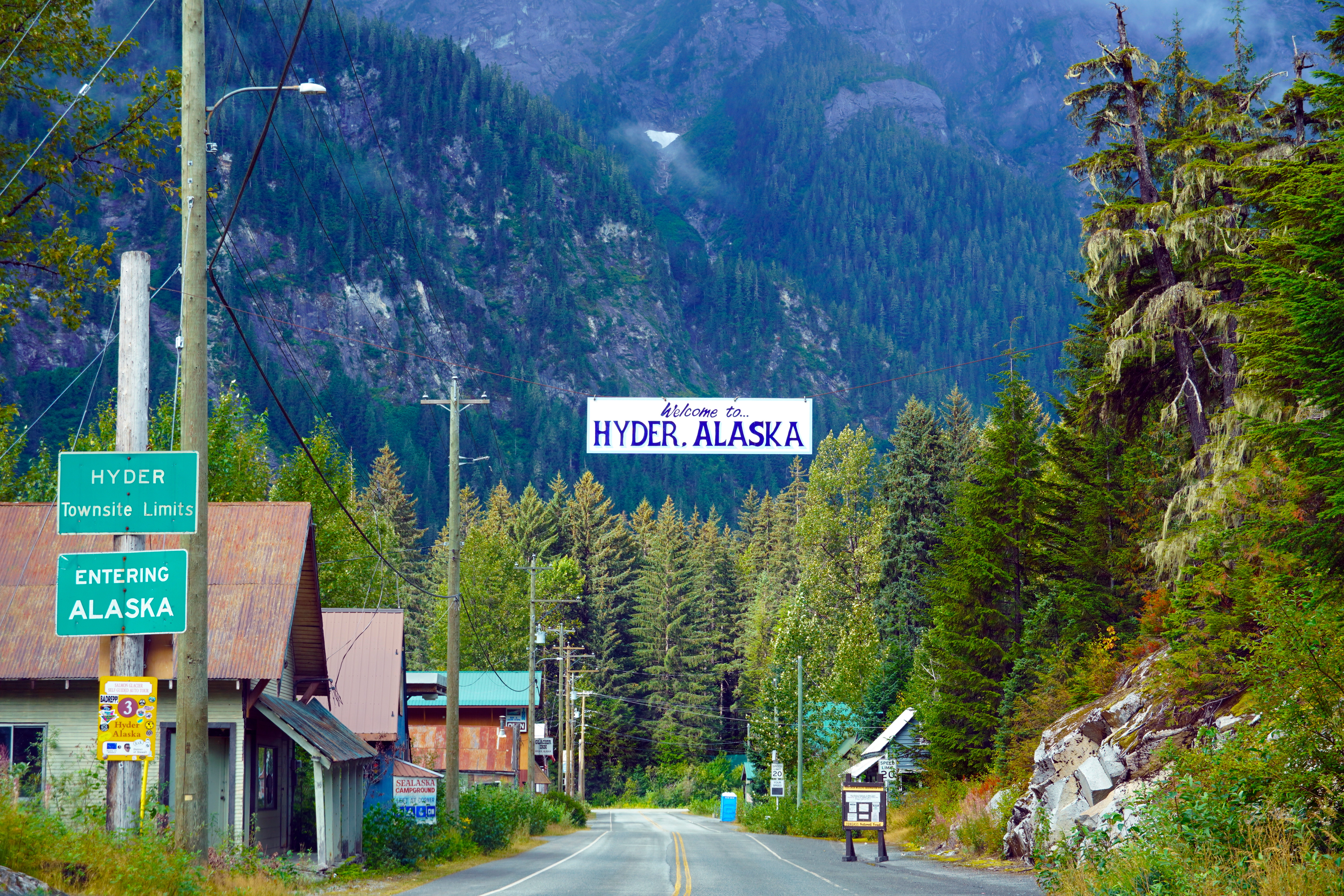
Hyder, Alaska has no border controls for travellers entering from Canada, and travellers flying between Hyder and other Alaskan cities by seaplane undergo internal border control

Multiple types of internal border controls exist in the United States. While the American territories of Guam and the Northern Mariana Islands follow the same visa policy as the mainland, together, they also maintain their own visa waiver programme for certain nationalities. Since the two territories are outside the customs territory of the United States, there are customs inspections when travelling between them, and the rest of the U.S. American Samoa has its own customs and immigration regulations, thus travelling between it and other American jurisdictions involves both customs and immigration inspections. The Virgin Islands are a special case, falling within the American immigration zone and solely following American visa policy, but being a customs free territory. As a result, there are no immigration checks between the two, but travellers arriving in Puerto Rico or the American mainland directly from the Virgin Islands are subject to border control for customs inspection. The United States also maintains interior checkpoints, similar to those maintained by Bhutan, along its borders with Mexico and Canada, subjecting people to border controls even after they have entered the country.

The Akwesasne nation; with territory in Ontario, Quebec, and New York; features several de facto internal border controls. As a result of protests by Akwesasne residents on their rights to cross the border unimpeded, as provided under the 1795 Jay Treaty, the Canada Border Services Agency closed its post on Cornwall Island, instead requiring travellers to proceed to the checkpoint in the city of Cornwall. As a consequence of the arrangement, residents of the island are required to clear border controls when proceeding North to the Ontarian mainland, as well as when proceeding South to Akwesasne territory in New York, thus constituting internal controls both from a Canadian perspective and from the perspective of the Akwesasne nation. Similarly, travelling between Canada and the Quebec portion of the Akwesasne nation requires driving through the state of New York, meaning that individuals will be required to clear American controls when leaving Quebec proper and to clear Canadian border controls when entering Quebec proper, though Canada does not impose border controls when entering the Quebec portion of the Akwesasne nation. Nevertheless, for residents who assert a Haudenosaunee national identity distinct from Canadian or American citizenship, the intricate network of Canadian and American border controls are seen as a foreign-imposed system of internal border controls, similar to the Israeli checkpoints in Palestinian territory.

The city of Hyder, Alaska has also been subject to internal border controls since America chose to stop regulating arrivals in Hyder from British Columbia. Since travellers exiting Hyder into Stewart, British Columbia are subject to Canadian border controls, it is theoretically possible for someone to accidentally enter Hyder from Canada without their travel documents and then to face difficulties since both America and Canada would subject them to border controls that require travel documents. At the same time, however, the northern road connecting Hyder to uninhabited mountain regions of British Columbia is equipped with neither American nor Canadian border controls, meaning that tourists from Canada proceeding northwards from Hyder are required to complete Canadian immigration formalities when they return to Stewart despite never having cleared American immigration.

==== Historical ====
In the past, internal border control measures were utilised by authorities in North America to control the movements of Indigenous or enslaved persons. Such systems typically took the form of an internal passport required for Indigenous or enslaved individuals to travel beyond their reserve or plantation.

In 1885 the "pass system" of internal border controls targeting Indigenous peoples was instituted in Canada. Introduced at the time of the North-West Rebellion, it remained in force until 1951. Any Indigenous person caught outside his Indian reserve without a pass issued by an Indian agent was returned to the reserve or incarcerated.

Throughout the Thirteen Colonies before the Revolutionary War, slaves confined to homes or agricultural plantations, or whose movements were limited by curfews, could be required to furnish written evidence their owner had granted an exemption to permit their free movement. For example, the New Hampshire Assembly in 1714 passed "An Act To Prevent Disorders In The Night":

Whereas great disorders, insolencies and burglaries are oft times raised and committed in the night time by Indian, Negro, and Molatto Servants and Slaves to the Disquiet and hurt of her Majesty, No Indian, Negro, or Molatto is to be from Home after 9 o'clock.

Notices emphasizing the curfew were published in The New Hampshire Gazette in 1764 and 1771.

Internal passports were required for African Americans in the southern slave states before the American Civil War, for example, an authenticated internal passport dated 1815 was presented to Massachusetts citizen George Barker to allow him to freely travel as a free black man to visit relatives in slave states. After many of these states seceded, forming the Confederate States of America, the Confederate government introduced internal passports for whites as well.

=== Realm of New Zealand ===
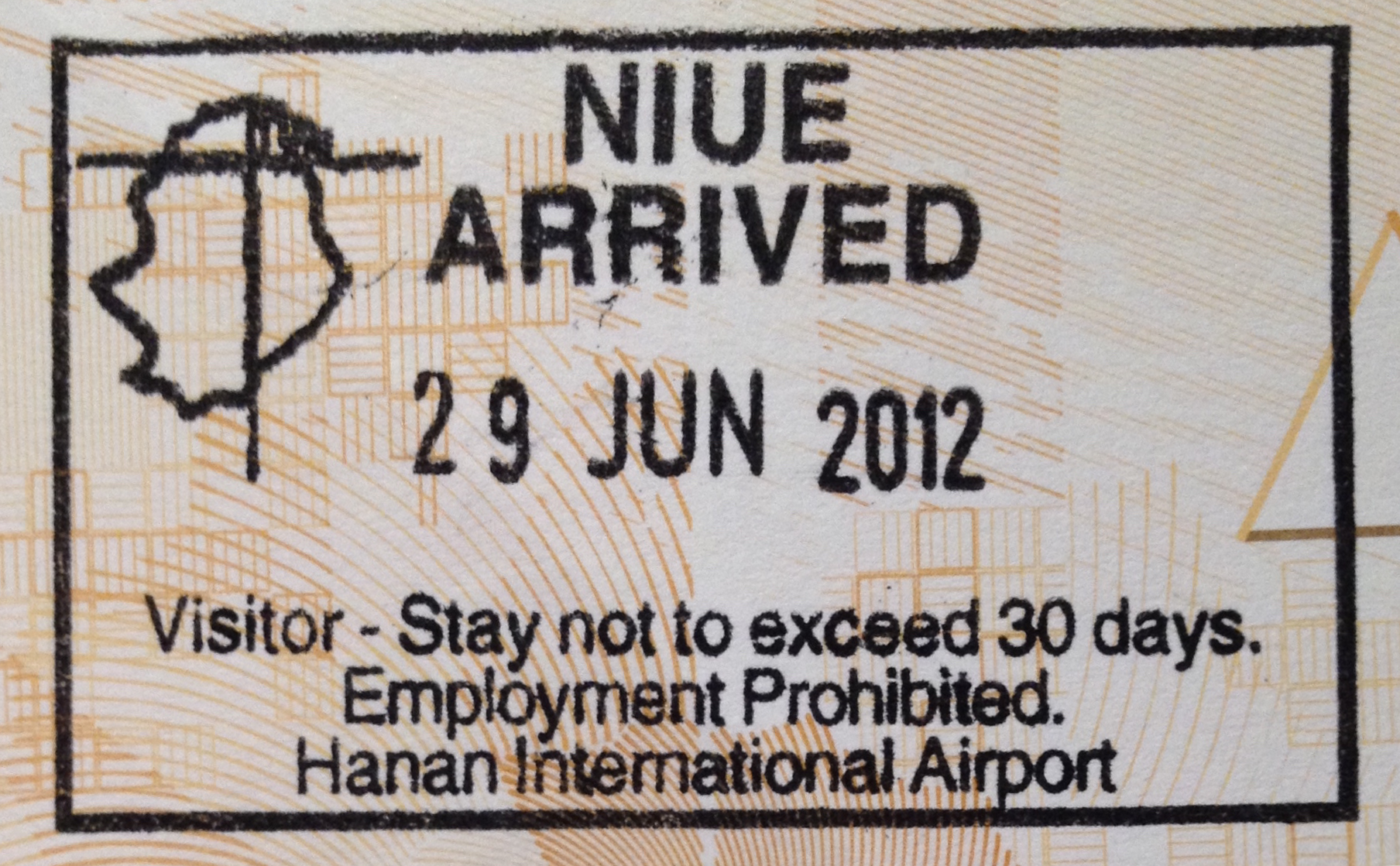
Niue entry stamp issued at Hanan International Airport

Tokelau, Niue, and the Cook Islands (Cook Islands Māori: Kūki 'Āirani) maintain independent and less restrictive border controls from New Zealand. The Cook Islands further maintain a separate nationality law. Additionally, border controls for Tokelau are complicated by the fact that the territory is, for the most part, only accessible via Samoa.

=== Apartheid-era South Africa ===
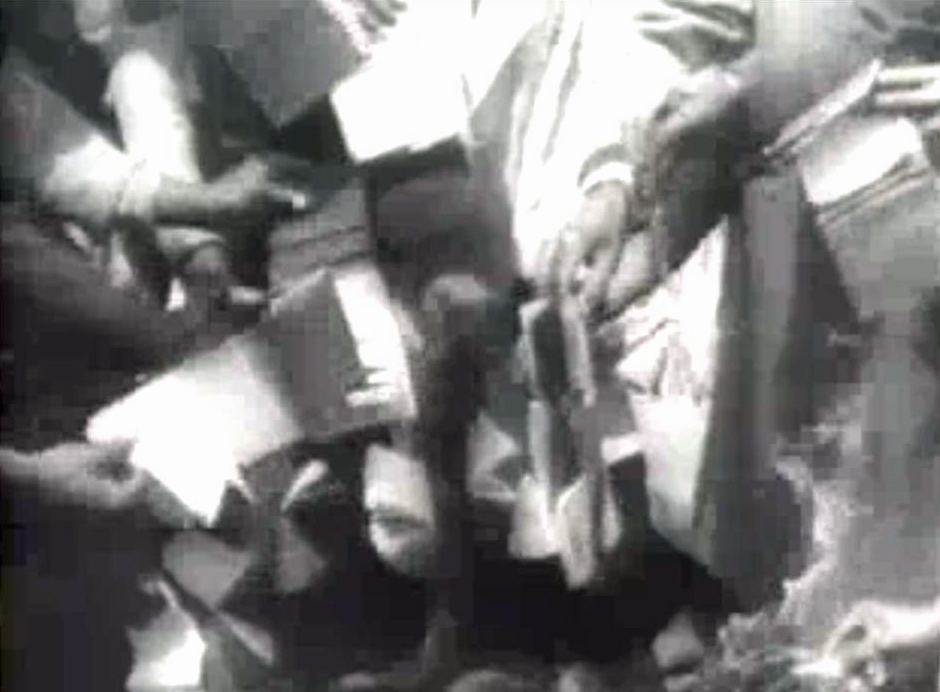
Demonstrators discarding their passbooks to protest apartheid, 1960

In South Africa prior to the end of Apartheid, pass laws were a form of internal passport system designed to segregate the population, manage urbanisation, and allocate migrant labour. Also known as the natives' law, pass laws severely limited the movements of not only black African citizens, but other people as well by requiring passes or designated areas. Before the 1950s, this legislation largely applied to African men, and attempts to apply it to women in the 1910s and 1950s were met with significant protests. Pass laws were one of the dominant features of the country's apartheid system until it was effectively ended in 1986. The first internal passports in South Africa were introduced on 27 June 1797 by the Earl Macartney in an attempt to prevent Africans from entering the Cape Colony. The Cape Colony was merged with the two Afrikaners republics in southern Africa to form the Union of South Africa in 1910. By this time, versions of pass laws existed elsewhere. A major boost for their utilization was the rise of the mining sector from the 1880s: pass laws provided a convenient means of controlling workers' mobility and enforcing contracts. In 1896 the South African Republic brought in two pass laws which required Africans to carry a metal badge. Only those employed by a master were permitted to remain on the Rand. Those entering a "labour district" needed a special pass which entitled them to remain for three days. The Natives (Urban Areas) Act of 1923 deemed urban areas in South Africa as "white" and required all black African men in cities and towns to carry around permits called "passes" at all times. Anyone found without a pass would be arrested immediately and sent to a rural area. It was replaced in 1945 by the Natives (Urban Areas) Consolidation Act, which imposed "influx control" on black men and also set up guidelines for removing people deemed to be living idle lives from urban areas. This act outlined requirements for African peoples' "qualification" to reside legally in white metropolitan areas. To do so, they had to have Section 10 rights, based on whether

- the person had been born there and resided there always since birth;
- the person had laboured continuously for ten years in any agreed area for any employer, or lived continuously in any such area for fifteen years;

The Black (Natives) Laws Amendment Act of 1952 amended the 1945 Native Urban Areas Consolidation Act, stipulating that all black people over the age of 16 were required to carry passes and that no black person could stay in an urban area more than 72 hours unless allowed to by Section 10. The Natives (Abolition of Passes and Co-ordination of Documents) Act of 1952, commonly known as the Pass Laws Act, repealed the many regional pass laws and instituted one nationwide pass law, which made it compulsory for all black South Africans over the age of 16 to carry the "passbook" at all times within white areas. The law stipulated where, when, and for how long a person could remain.

The document was similar to an internal passport, containing details on the bearer such as their fingerprints, photograph, the name of his/her employer, his/her address, how long the bearer had been employed, as well as other identification information. Employers often entered a behavioural evaluation, on the conduct of the pass holder. An employer was defined under the law and could only be a white person. The pass also documented permission requested and denied or granted to be in a certain region and the reason for seeking such permission. Under the terms of the law, any government employee could strike out such entries, basically cancelling the permission to remain in the area. A passbook without a valid entry then allowed officials to arrest and imprison the bearer of the pass. These passes often became the most despised symbols of apartheid. The resistance to the Pass Law led to many thousands of arrests and was the spark that ignited the Sharpeville Massacre on 21 March 1960, and led to the arrest of Robert Sobukwe that day.

== See also ==
- Border barrier
- Airspace
- Air sovereignty
- Illegal entry
- United States Border Patrol
- Security guard
- Illegal immigration
- Immigration law
- Maritime boundary
- Freedom of movement
- Refugees
