= Abaytikau =

Abaytikau Абайтикау Абайтыхъæу
- Selo
- Location within North Ossetia–Alania Location within Russia
- Coordinates: 42°40′N 44°10′E
- Country: Russia
- Region: North Ossetia-Alania
- District: Alagirsky District
- Time zone: UTC+3:00

Abaytikau (Russian: Абайтикау; Iron Ossetic: Абайтыхъæу, Abajtyqæw) is a rural locality (a selo) in Tseyskoye Rural Settlement of Alagirsky District, Russia. The population was 42 as of 2018.

== Geography ==
Abaytikau is located 50 km (31 mi) southwest of Alagir (the district's administrative centre) by road. Nizhny Tsey is the nearest rural locality.
