= Igor Kupiejew =

Igor Borisowicz Kupiejew
Personal information
- Born: February 20, 1974 (age 52) Alagir

Professional wrestling career
- Billed height: 170 cm (67 in)
- Billed weight: 75 kg (165 lb)
- Debut: 1987

Igor Borisowicz Kupiejew (born 20 February 1974) is a Russian and (since 1997) Uzbek professional wrestler, who fights freestyle. He took part in the World Wrestling Championships three times, scoring fourth in 1996. He was seventh at Asian Games in 1998. He won a gold medal at Asian Championships in 1999, 2000, and took first place in FILA Wrestling World Cup in 1996. He won a bronze medal in Junior World's Championships in 1992.
