= Alagirsky District =

Administrative district in Russia

Alagirsky District Алагирский район (Russian)
- District

Other transcription(s)
  - Ossetic: Алагиры район
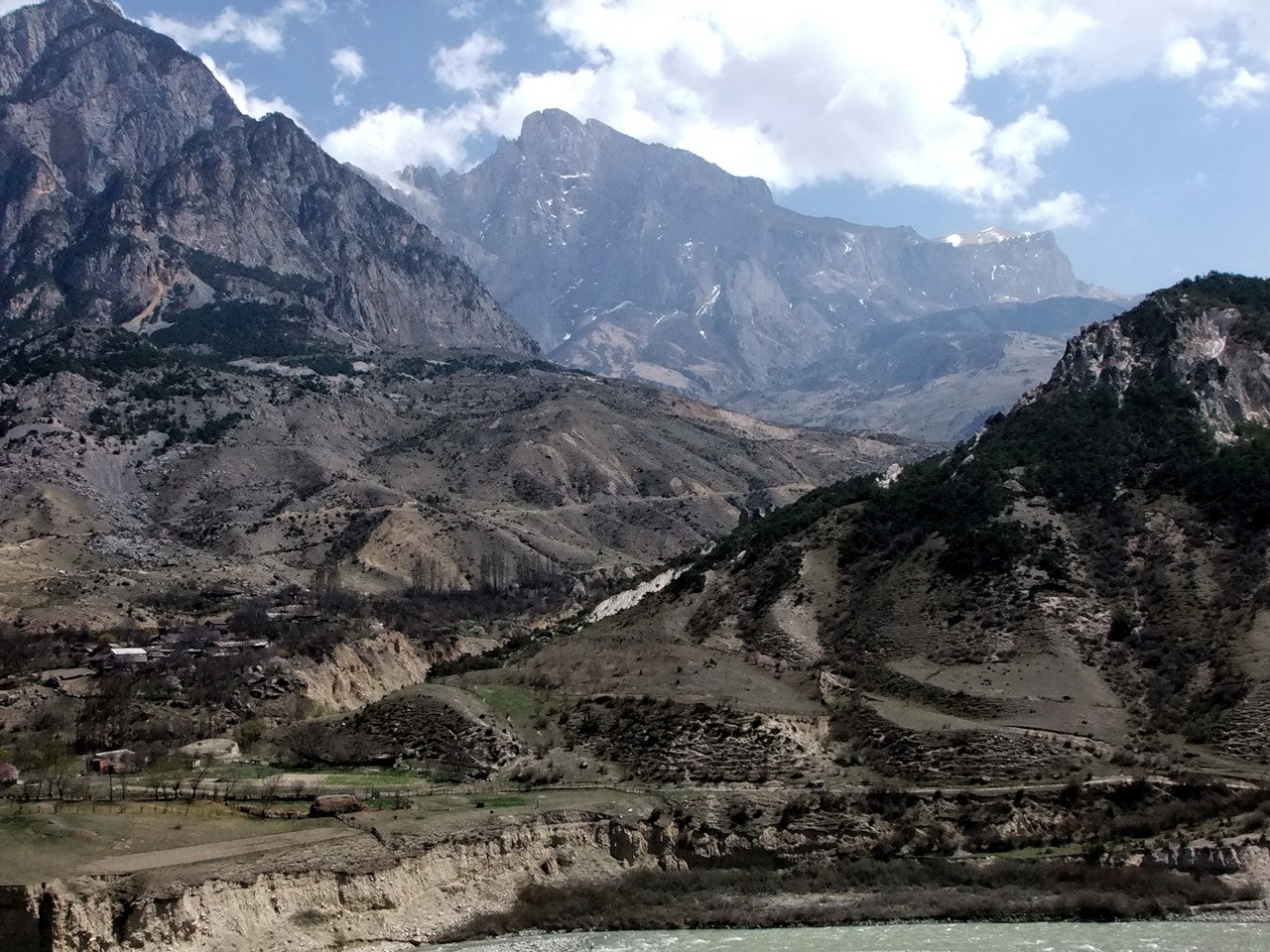
- Mountains in Alagirsky District
- Location of Alagirsky District in the Republic of North Ossetia–Alania
- Coordinates: 42°51′N 44°07′E
- Country: Russia
- Federal subject: Republic of North Ossetia–Alania
- Administrative center: Alagir

Area
  - Total: 2,135 km^{2} (824 sq mi)

Population (2010 Census)
  - Total: 38,830
  - Density: 18.19/km^{2} (47.11/sq mi)
  - Urban: 54.0%
  - Rural: 46.0%

Administrative structure
  - Administrative divisions: 1 Towns under district jurisdiction, 17 Rural okrugs
  - Inhabited localities: 1 cities/towns, 83 rural localities

Municipal structure
  - Municipally incorporated as: Alagirsky Municipal District
  - Municipal divisions: 1 urban settlements, 17 rural settlements
- Time zone: UTC+3 (MSK)
- OKTMO ID: 90605000
- Website: http://xn----7sbam0ao3b.xn--p1ai/

Alagirsky District (Russian: Алаги́рский райо́н; Iron Ossetic: Алагиры район, Alagiry rajon) is an administrative and municipal district (raion), one of the eight in the Republic of North Ossetia–Alania, Russia. It is located in the central and southern parts of the republic along the Russian border with South Ossetia/Georgia. The area of the district is 2,135 square kilometers (824 sq mi). Its administrative center is the town of Alagir. Population: 38,830 (2010 census); 38,581 (2002 Census); 39,048 (1989 Soviet census). The population of Alagir accounts for 54.0% of the district's total population.

== Geography and tourism ==
A major part of the district is located in the mountainous part of the republic. Tsey ski resort is located in the district.

== Villages and settlements ==
- Abaytikau
