= Tsey =

Coordinates: 42°46′N 43°53′E

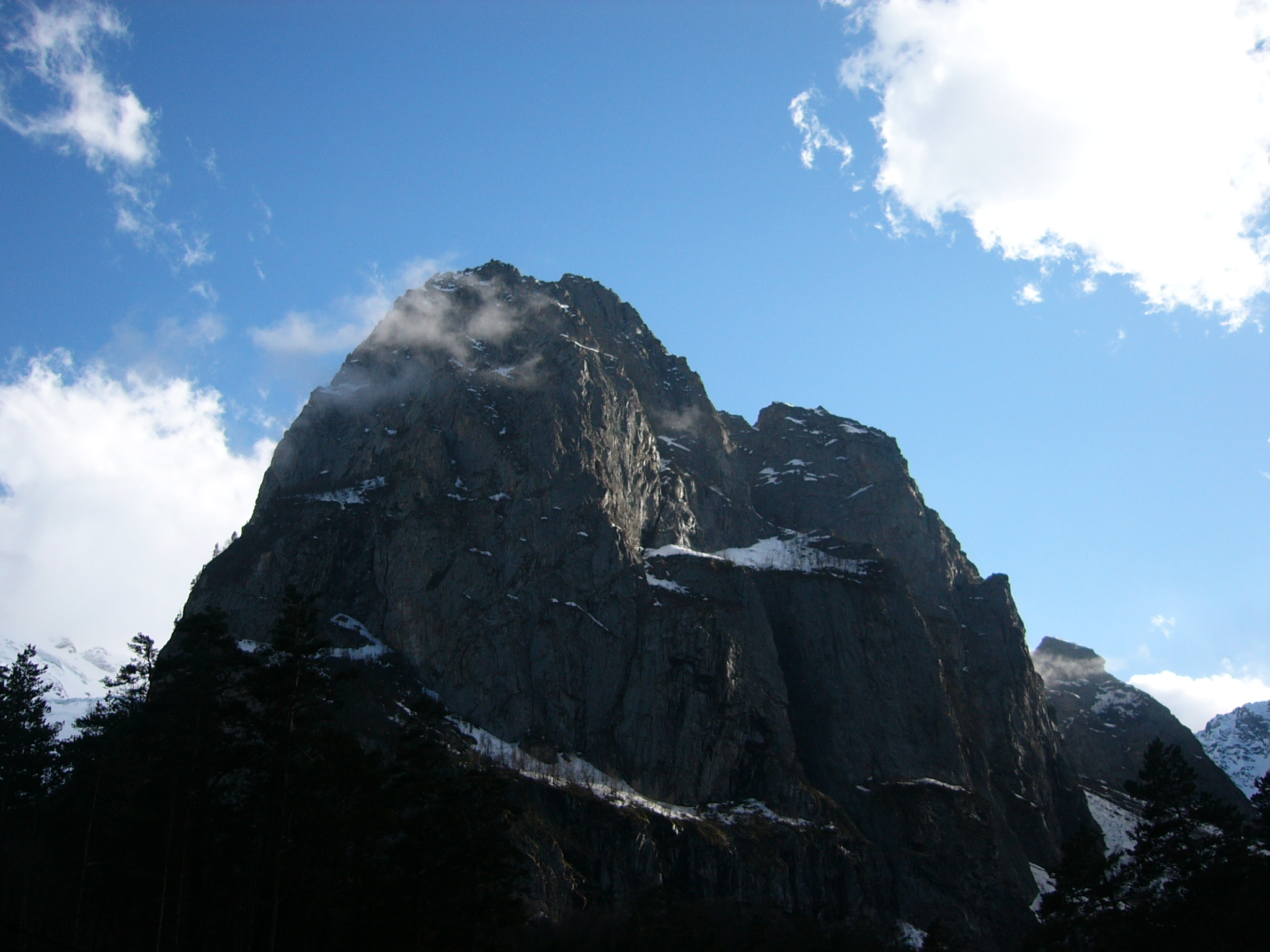
Monakh Mount

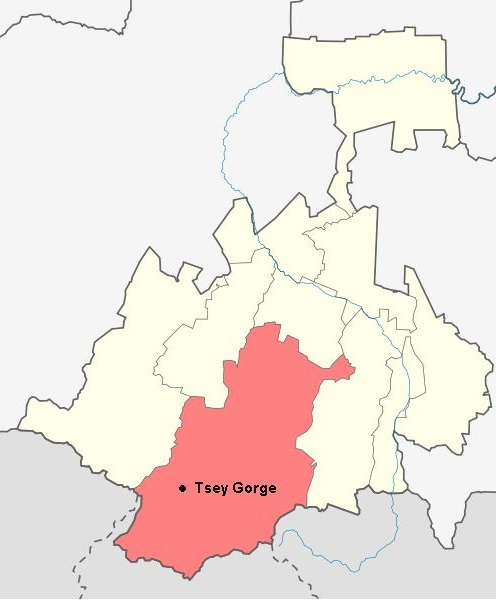
Location of Tsey in the Republic of North Ossetia-Alania

Tsey or Tsey Gorge (Russian: Цей; Ossetian: Цъæй, C'æj) is a gorge, ski resort and a tourist centres of the Republic of North Ossetia–Alania, Russia. Tsey is located in Alagirsky District and is part of North Ossetia State National park.

== Ski-resort statistics ==
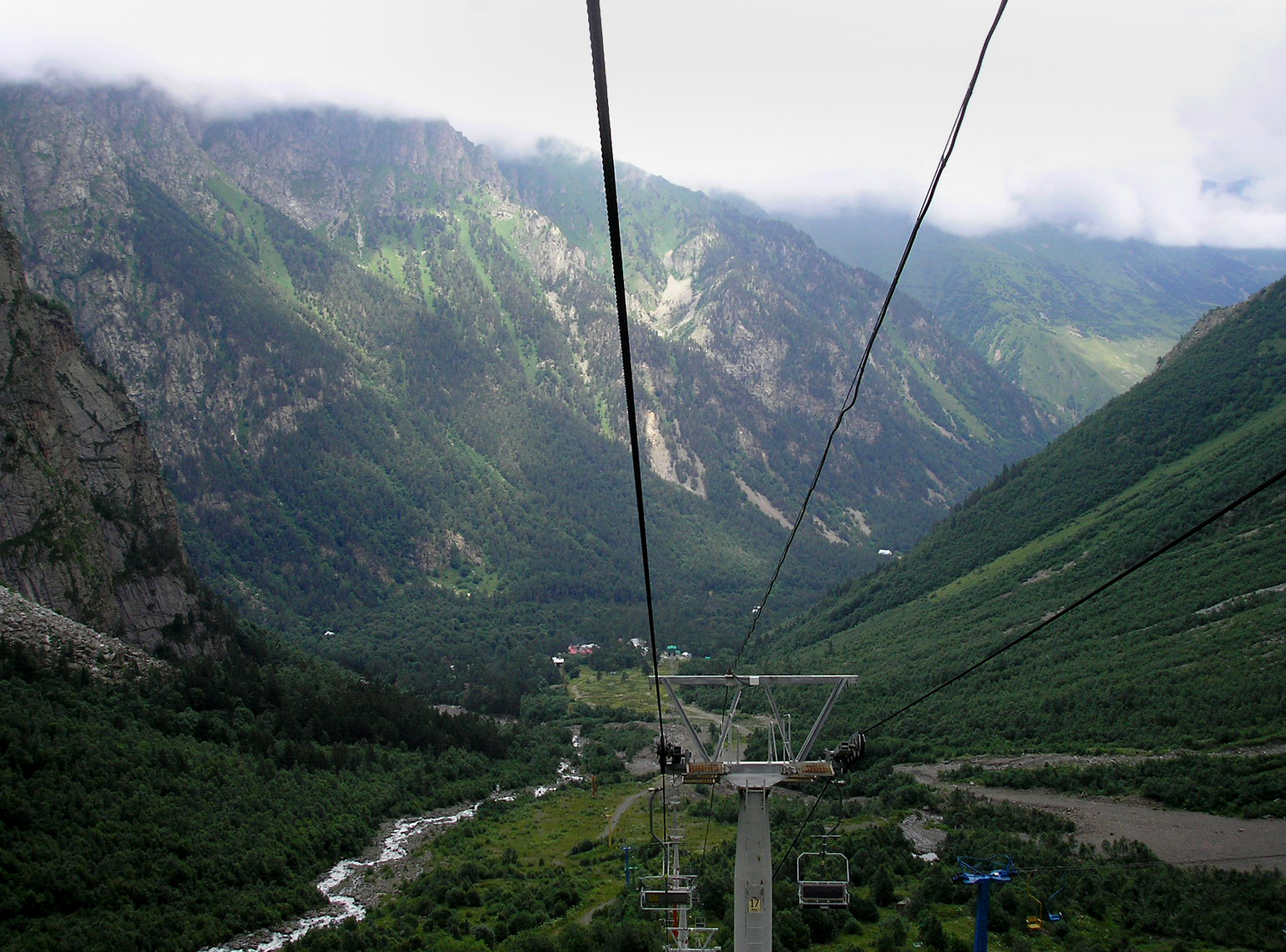
Chairlift in Tsey Gorge

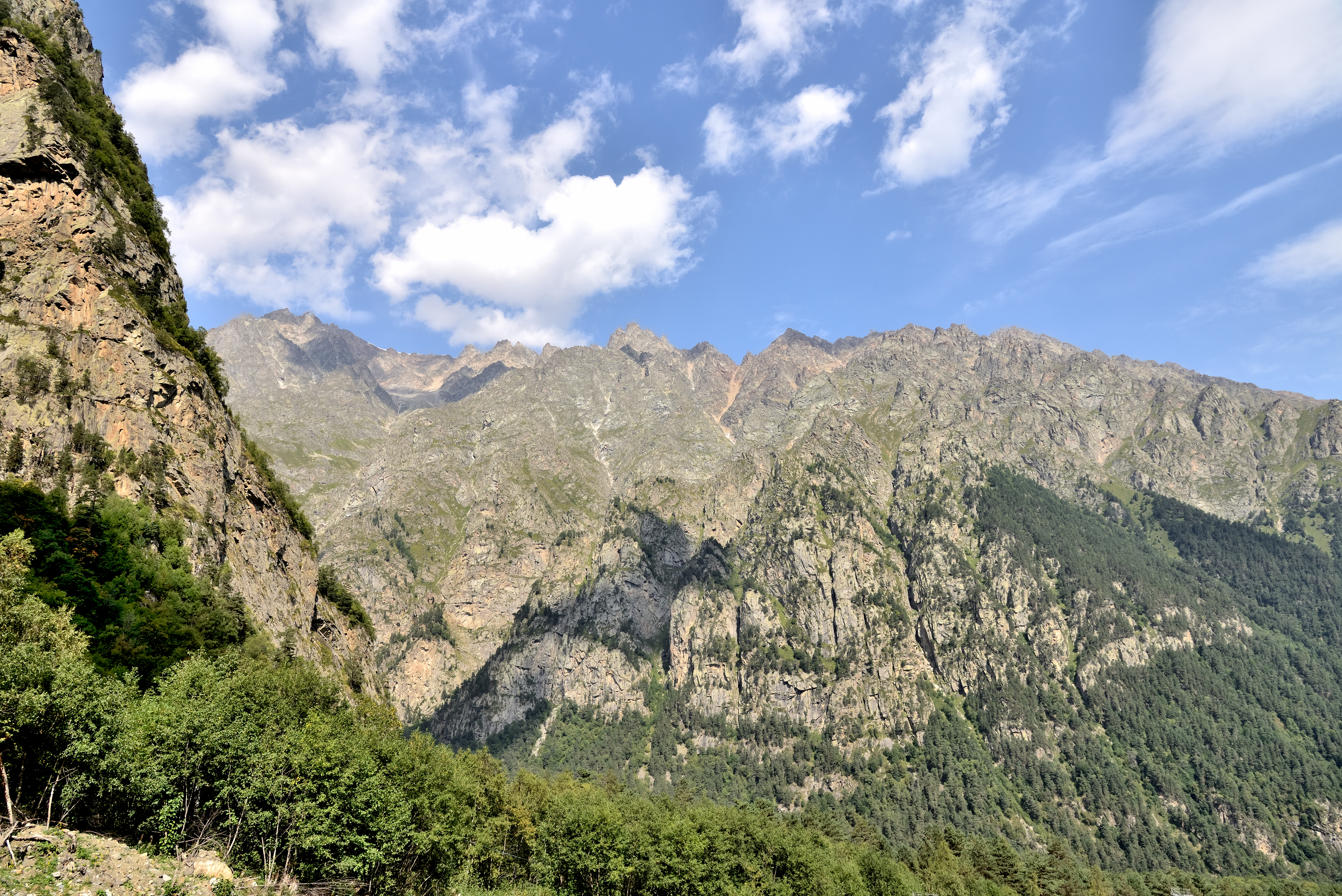
Skazsky gorge near the alpine camp

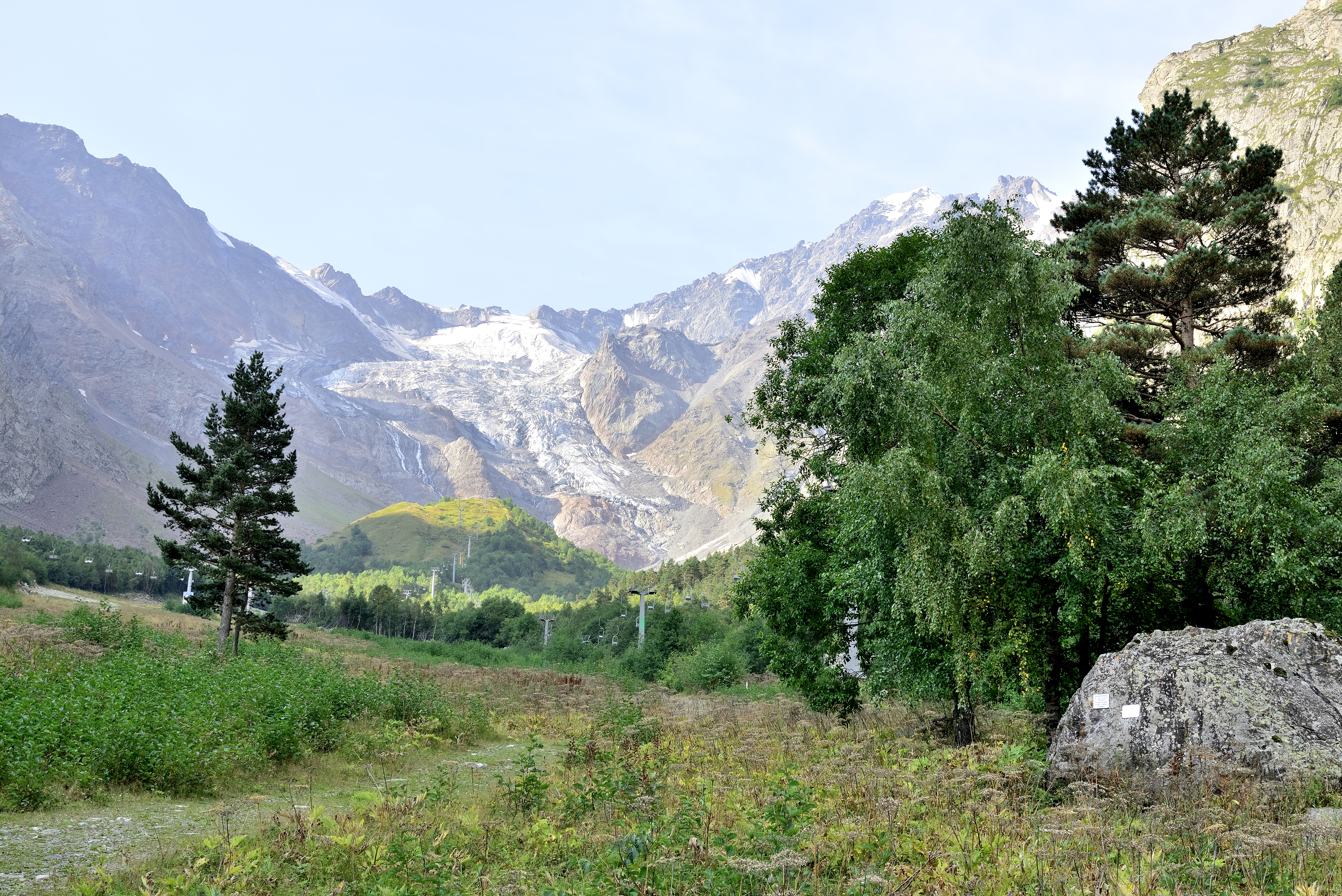
Skazsky gorge

There are two chairlifts in the Tsey one of them is two-person.

== Transportation ==
The gorge is situated less than 100 km from Vladikavkaz, the capital of North Osetia-Alania.

== Main summits ==
- Aday-Khokh 4410 m
- Pik Antonovicha 4200m
- Vils 3870m
- Zaramag 4200 m
- Pik Zolotareva 4200m
- Kalper 3800m
- Kaltberg 4120 m
- Lagau 4124 m
- Mamison 4360 m
- Monakh 2990 m
- Moskvich 3790m
- Pik Nikolayeva 3850m
- Pik Oniani 4200m
- Passionariya 4000m
- Pik Pliyeva 3990m
- Pik Poyasova 4200m
- Ronketti 4050 m
- Malaya Songuti 4000m
- Spartak-Tseysky
- Pik Turistov
- Turkhokh 4110m
- Uilpata 4648 m
- Ularg 4320m
- Khitsan 3600m
- Tsey-Khokh 4110m
- Chanchakhi 4450 m
- Pik Shulgina 3900m
