= Alagir =

Town in the Republic of North Ossetia-Alania, Russia

Alagir Алагир
- Town

Other transcription(s)
  - Ossetic: Алагир
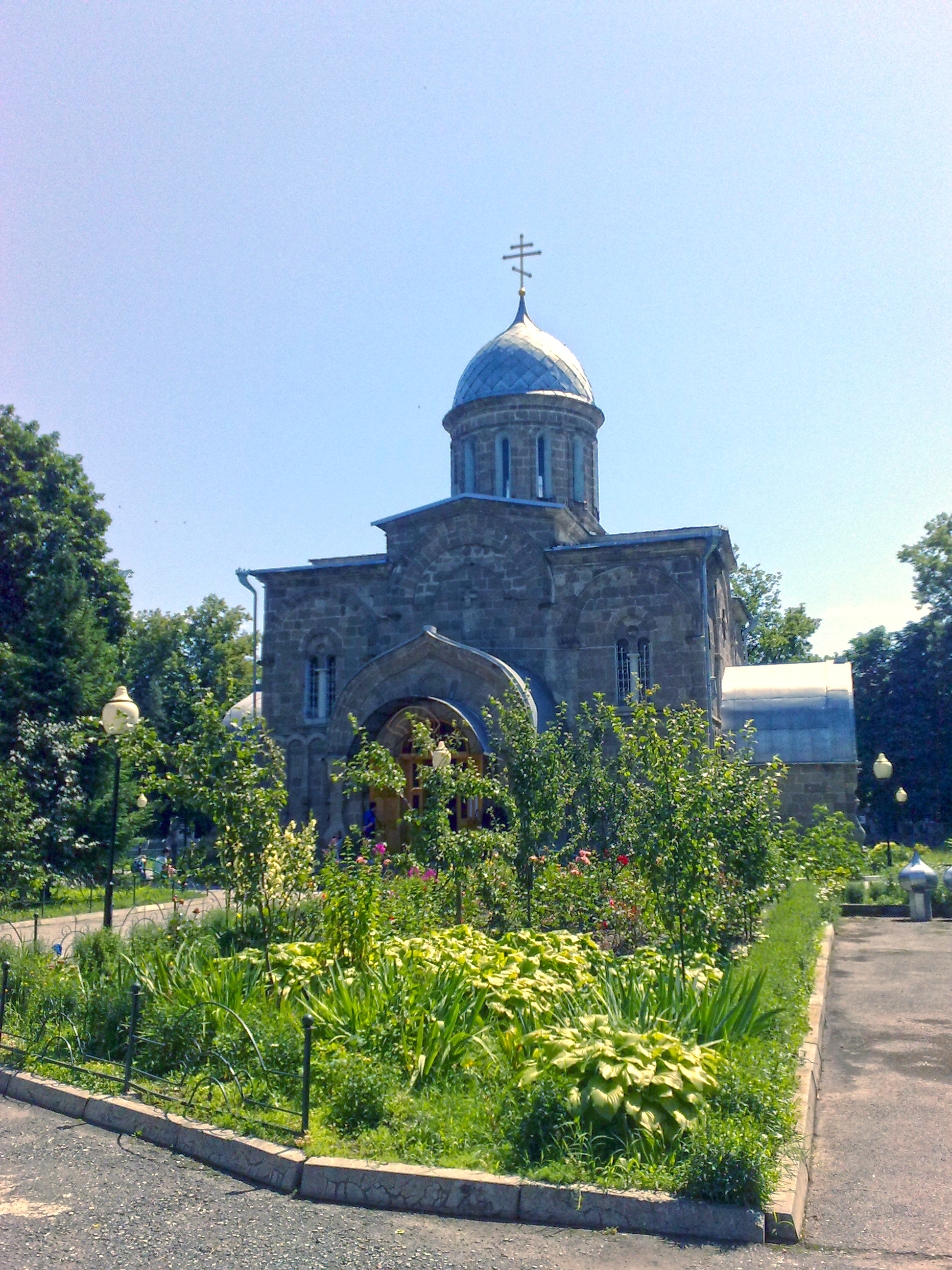
- The Cathedral of the Assumption, Alagir
- Interactive map of Alagir
- Location of Alagir Alagir (North Ossetia–Alania)
- Coordinates: 43°02′N 44°14′E
- Country: Russia
- Federal subject: North Ossetia–Alania
- Administrative district: Alagirsky District
- Town Under District JurisdictionSelsoviet: Alagir
- Founded: 1850
- Town status since: 1938
- Elevation: 600 m (2,000 ft)

Population (2010 Census)
  - Total: 20,949
  - Estimate (2023): 21,315 (+1.7%)

Administrative status
  - Capital of: Alagirsky District, Alagir Town Under District Jurisdiction

Municipal status
  - Municipal district: Alagirsky Municipal District
  - Urban settlement: Alagirskoye Urban Settlement
  - Capital of: Alagirsky Municipal District, Alagirskoye Urban Settlement
- Time zone: UTC+3 (MSK)
- Postal codes: 363240–363243, 363245, 363246
- Dialing code: +7 86731
- OKTMO ID: 90605101001

Alagir (Russian: Алаги́р; Iron Ossetic: Алагир) is an industrial town and the administrative center of Alagirsky District in the Republic of North Ossetia-Alania, Russia, located on the west bank of the Ardon River, 54 kilometers (34 mi) west of the republic's capital Vladikavkaz. As of the 2010 Census, its population was 20,949.

== Etymology ==
The name is derived from Ossetian Uællag 'Upper' and Ir 'Ossetia'.

== History ==
The town was established in 1850 by Prince Mikhail Semyonovich Vorontsov, the Viceroy of the Caucasus, near an ancient silver/lead mine in the nearby Alagir Gorge. It was built up as a fortification around a smelting plant and became a major mining center. By the end of the 19th century, it had been increasingly populated by Georgians and Russians who came to work there. During the Russian Civil War, in January 1919, Alagir was a scene of intense fighting, which resulted in heavy casualties in Georgian population and difficult flight of the survivors through the mountainous passes into Georgia. The Soviet leader Vladimir Lenin commented on the incident, blaming "counter-revolutionaries" for atrocities in Alagir, which Georgians tend to attribute to the Ossetian radicals.

Alagir was granted town status in 1938. During World War II, on November 5, 1942, the German III Panzer Corps and Romanian 2nd Mountain Division (under von Kleist) captured the town and held it until it was recovered by the Soviet forces in early January 1943.

== Administrative and municipal status ==
Within the framework of administrative divisions, Alagir serves as the administrative center of Alagirsky District. As an administrative division, it is, together with two rural localities, incorporated within Alagirsky District as Alagir Town Under District Jurisdiction. As a municipal division, the town of Alagir (without the rural localities) is incorporated within Alagirsky Municipal District as Alagirskoye Urban Settlement.

== Economy ==
The town's economy is still dominated by mining and mineral extraction, but it also has significant woodworking, canning, and manufacturing industries.

== Demographics ==
Alagir population
- 2010 Census: 20,949
- 2002 Census: 21,496
- 1989 Census: 21,132
- 1979 Census: 19,007

Major ethnic groups comprising the town's population, as of 2002, are:

- Ossetians: 91.1%
- Russians: 6.2%

== Notable people ==
- Stanislav Cherchesov, association football manager and former player
- Aslan Dudiyev, professional association football player
- Khetag Gazyumov, freestyle wrestler
- Igor Kupiejew, professional freestyle wrestler
- Sergey Menyaylo, politician; Head of North Ossetia-Alania, former Governor of Sevastopol
- Wakanohō Toshinori, sumo wrestler
