= Chinese nationality law =

Conditions by which a person holds the nationality of the People's Republic of China

Nationality Law of the People's Republic of China

National People's Congress
- Territorial extent: China
- Enacted by: 5th National People's Congress
- Enacted: September 10, 1980
- Effective: September 10, 1980

Related legislation
- Nationality Act (Republic of China)
- Status: In force

Nationality Law of the People's Republic of China
- Simplified Chinese: 中华人民共和国国籍法
- Traditional Chinese: 中華人民共和國國籍法
Transcriptions
Standard Mandarin
- Hanyu Pinyin: Zhōnghuá rénmín gònghéguó guójí fǎ
Yue: Cantonese
- Jyutping: zung1 waa4 jan4 man4 gung6 wo4 gwok3 gwok3 zik6 faat3

Portuguese name
- Portuguese: Lei da Nacionalidade da República Popular da China

Chinese nationality law details the conditions by which a person holds the nationality of the People's Republic of China (PRC). The primary law governing these requirements is the Nationality Law of the People's Republic of China, which came into force on September 10, 1980. Chinese nationality law is complex, as citizenship status and the rights attached to it vary across different jurisdictions within the PRC.

Chinese nationality law primarily follows the principle of jus sanguinis. A person born to at least one Chinese national parent generally acquires Chinese nationality at birth, regardless of place of birth. However, a child born abroad to Chinese parents who have settled overseas and acquired foreign nationality may not be recognized as a Chinese national.

Chinese nationals with mainland residency who voluntarily acquire foreign citizenship automatically lose Chinese nationality. By contrast, most residents of the special administrative regions of Hong Kong and Macau held foreign nationality under the laws of other states prior to them becoming part of the PRC in the 1990s. These individuals were permitted to retain such nationalities, which has resulted in a significant number of residents of Hong Kong and Macau holding foreign nationalities, most commonly British or Portuguese, alongside Chinese nationality.

Although mainland China, Hong Kong, and Macau are all administered by the PRC, Chinese citizens do not have automatic residence rights in all three jurisdictions; each territory maintains a separate residency and immigration policy. Voting rights and freedom of movement are tied to the region in which a Chinese citizen is domiciled, determined by hukou in mainland China and right of abode in the two special administrative regions.

The People's Republic of China considers residents of Taiwan to be Chinese citizens under its nationality law, based on its claim over territories administered by the Republic of China (ROC). However, following the Chinese Civil War and the retreat of the government of the Republic of China to Taiwan, residents of Taiwan are governed under a separate legal system in practice and do not hold mainland hukou. They may not vote, hold public office or automatically access mainland social welfare benefits. At the same time, they are not classified as foreigners; using specialized permits, they can enter, work, and permanently settle in mainland China.

Officially, the PRC permits foreign nationals to acquire Chinese citizenship through naturalization after renouncing their previous nationality. Foreigners may naturalize if they are permanent residents in any part of China or they have immediate family members who are Chinese citizens. However, naturalization is not treated as an individual right. In practice, naturalization is extremely rare and the process widely regarded as difficult due to the broad discretionary authority exercised by state authorities, and the absence of clearly defined eligibility criteria.

== History ==
=== Qing policy ===
Before the mid-19th century, nationality issues involving China were extremely rare and could be handled on an individual basis. Customary law dictated that children born to Chinese subjects took the nationality of the father, but did not have clear rules for renunciation of citizenship or the naturalization of aliens. Imperial Chinese subjects were traditionally severely restricted from traveling overseas and international travel was only sanctioned for official business. Disputes arising from nationality questions became more common as the Qing dynasty was forced through a series of unequal treaties to open up trade with Western empires and allow its subjects to migrate overseas.

The Qing government created the first Chinese nationality law in 1909, which defined a Chinese national as any person born to a Chinese father. Children born to a Chinese mother inherited her nationality only if the father was stateless or had unknown nationality status. Women who married foreigners lost Chinese nationality if they took the nationality of their husbands. Nationality could be inherited perpetually from Chinese fathers, making it difficult to lose for men. These regulations were enacted in response to a 1907 statute passed in the Netherlands that retroactively treated all Chinese born in the Dutch East Indies as Dutch citizens. Jus sanguinis was chosen to define Chinese nationality so that the Qing could counter foreign claims on overseas Chinese populations and maintain the perpetual allegiance of its subjects living abroad through paternal lineage.

The 1909 law placed restrictions on Chinese subjects with dual nationality within China. At the time, foreign powers exercised extraterritoriality over their own nationals residing in China. Chinese subjects claiming another nationality by virtue of their birth in a foreign concession became exempt from Qing taxation and legal jurisdiction within Chinese borders. A strict policy against automatic expatriation was adopted to prevent this; a Chinese individual's foreign nationality was not recognized by Qing authorities unless specifically approved. Foreigners who acquired Chinese nationality were subject to restrictions as well; naturalized Qing subjects could not serve in high military or political office until 20 years after becoming a Chinese national, and only with imperial authorization.

=== Modern China ===
Nationality law remained largely unchanged in the Republican China. In 1912, the government issued a nationality law which used numerous provisions from the Qing nationality law and sought to develop nationality principles in greater legal detail. This law was revised in 1914.

During the late Beiyang government period, ideas of citizenship or what made the people "Chinese" were in flux, allowing for some anomalous naturalizations in chaotic political environment, such as that of Frédéric-Vincent Lebbe. During this period, Sun Yat-sen lectured against the idea of assimilating Europeans into the Chinese nation. The Nationalist government re-adopted a narrower view of nationhood, based on the idea of the Chinese as an ethnically and territorially unified people. A major revision passed by the Kuomintang in 1929 decoupled a woman's nationality from that of her husband and minimized circumstances in which children would be born stateless. The Kuomintang continued to use the 1929 law after its defeat in the Chinese Civil War and retreat to Taiwan.

After the Communist Revolution, the new government abolished all republican-era legislation but did not immediately create laws to replace them. Mainland China lacked formal nationality regulations until greater legal reform began in the late 1970s to 1980s. The government unofficially applied the 1929 statute during this time to resolve nationality issues, and also made a mother's nationality normally transferable to her children outside of cases where the father is stateless. The PRC does not recognize dual nationality and actively discouraged its occurrence in its treaties with Indonesia, Nepal, and Mongolia in the 1950s. When the National People's Congress adopted the current nationality law in 1980, a further stipulation was added that automatically revokes nationality from Chinese nationals who settle overseas and voluntarily acquire foreign citizenship.

==== Special administrative regions ====
Hong Kong was a British colony from 1842 until its transfer to China in 1997. It initially consisted only of Hong Kong Island and was expanded to include Kowloon Peninsula and Stonecutters Island in 1860. These areas were ceded in perpetuity to the United Kingdom by the Qing dynasty after the Opium Wars. Britain negotiated a further expansion of the colony to include the New Territories in 1898, which were leased (rather than ceded) from China for a period of 99 years. Towards the end of this lease, the British and Chinese governments entered into negotiations over the future of Hong Kong and agreed on the Sino-British Joint Declaration in 1984. The entire territory of Hong Kong would be transferred to China at the conclusion of the New Territories lease in 1997 and governed under Chinese sovereignty as a special administrative region.

Macau was established as a trading post in 1557 permanently leased to the Kingdom of Portugal by the Ming dynasty. The territory was later fully ceded in the 1887 Sino-Portuguese Treaty of Peking, but returned to China in 1999. Following the 1974 Carnation Revolution, Portugal formally relinquished Macau as an overseas province in 1976 and acknowledged it as a "Chinese territory under Portuguese administration." After negotiations on Hong Kong's future had concluded, China and Portugal began deliberations on Macau in 1986 and agreed on the Sino-Portuguese Joint Declaration in 1987. Macau would be transferred to China in 1999 and governed largely under the same terms as Hong Kong.

Although most Hongkongers at the time were British Dependent Territories citizens (BDTCs) and a substantial number of Macau residents held Portuguese citizenship, China treats all ethnic Chinese born in these territories before and after the handovers as Chinese nationals. Hong Kong BDTCs who did not have strong ties to another British Dependent Territory lost BDTC status on July 1, 1997. Former ethnic Chinese BDTCs could retain British nationality if they had voluntarily registered as British Nationals (Overseas) or acquired full British citizenship as part of the British Nationality Selection Scheme prior to the transfer of sovereignty, while Macau residents with Portuguese citizenship were permitted to continue that status in all cases. However, Chinese authorities treat these individuals solely as Chinese nationals and bar them from receiving British or Portuguese consular assistance while in Chinese territory.

Given that a large number of Hongkongers and Macanese continue to hold dual nationality after the handover, the Standing Committee of the National People's Congress issued two sets of "Explanations" of the nationality law as implemented in the special administrative regions so that Hong Kong or Macau residents who acquire a foreign nationality do not lose their Chinese nationality unless they file a declaration of change of nationality. Since 2021, the government of Hong Kong started refusing to allow consular protection to dual nationals, citing the policy that Hong Kong residents of Chinese descent, whether born in the city or on the mainland, are regarded as Chinese nationals and thus are ineligible.

==== Territory controlled by Taiwan ====
The Republic of China (ROC) governed mainland China from 1912 to 1949. Near the end of the Chinese Civil War, the Nationalist government was forced to retreat to Taiwan by Chinese Communist Party forces, and it subsequently established the People's Republic of China (PRC) in 1949. Since the conclusion of the war, the ROC has controlled only the Taiwan Area. Because both the PRC and ROC constitutionally claim areas under the other's control, the two governments treat each other's nationals as their own.

== Acquisition and loss of nationality ==
Individuals born within the People's Republic of China automatically receive Chinese nationality at birth if at least one parent is a Chinese national. Children born overseas to at least one Chinese parent are also Chinese nationals, unless they are foreign citizens at birth and either parent with Chinese nationality has acquired permanent residency abroad or foreign citizenship. In Hong Kong and Macau, broader regulations apply; all individuals of ethnic Chinese origin who possess right of abode in either region and were born in a Chinese territory are considered Chinese nationals, regardless of the nationalities of their parents. Furthermore, because of China's continuing claims over Taiwan, ROC nationals from Taiwan are considered PRC nationals by the PRC.

Foreigners may naturalize as Chinese nationals if they have immediate family with Chinese nationality, possess permanent residency in mainland China or a special administrative region, or have other "legitimate reasons". Applications for naturalization are normally considered by the National Immigration Administration in mainland China, while responsibility for this process is delegated to the Immigration Department in Hong Kong and the Identification Services Bureau in Macau. Successful applicants are required to renounce any foreign nationalities they have. Naturalization is exceptionally rare in mainland China; there were only 1,448 naturalized persons reported in the 2010 census out of the country's total population of 1.34 billion. Acquiring Chinese nationality is more common in Hong Kong; the Immigration Department naturalized over 10,000 people between the transfer of sovereignty and 2012, and continues to receive over 1,500 applications per year since 2016.

Chinese nationality can be relinquished by making a declaration of renunciation. It is also automatically revoked when persons from mainland China who reside abroad voluntarily acquire a foreign nationality. Hong Kong and Macau residents who become foreign citizens continue to be Chinese nationals unless they make an explicit declaration of nationality change to their territorial immigration authorities. Macanese residents with mixed Chinese-Portuguese ancestry are specifically given a choice between Chinese and Portuguese nationalities. On submitting a formal declaration to select Portuguese nationality, these individuals would lose Chinese nationality. Former Chinese nationals may subsequently apply for nationality restoration, subject to discretionary approval. Similar to naturalizing candidates, successful applicants must renounce their foreign nationalities.

While Chinese nationality law does not recognize multiple nationalities, the current legal framework and its practical implementation allow for certain situations where de facto dual nationality occurs: Those children who are born to Chinese parents living abroad only temporarily, such as diplomatic staff, humanitarian workers or overseas students, will still be regarded as Chinese nationals and hence be de facto nationals of both the Chinese and the foreign state. Chinese officials who naturalize in another country cannot renounce their Chinese nationality and hence will continue to be treated as Chinese nationals by the Chinese state.

Those born abroad to Chinese parents who neither of them have acquired permanent residency abroad or foreign citizenship may also hold more than 1 nationality, depending on the nationality status of the parents, nationality laws from the countries of nationalities held by the parents (first 2 apply in case of nationality conflict parents) and the birth country’s law (birth in jus soli countries may result in nationality conflicts)

== Rights and restrictions ==
Although mainland China, Hong Kong, and Macau constitute a single country, Chinese citizens do not have freedom of movement in all three jurisdictions. Each region maintains a separate immigration policy and can deny entry to or deport non-resident Chinese citizens visiting from outside that territory. When traveling to other countries, visa requirements vary depending on where a Chinese citizen is permanently resident. As of 2025, mainland Chinese residents can travel to 83, Macau residents to 144, and Hong Kong residents to 169 destinations without pre-departure approval for visa.

=== Mainland China ===
Hukou is a household registration system that regulates internal migration within mainland China. Citizens are assigned a hukou classification (rural or urban) at birth based on their family's registration. The type of social welfare a person receives from the state is tied to hukou; individuals with rural hukou are allocated a housing plot with land for farming, while urban residents are provided with a variety of government services in their locale including healthcare, public education, unemployment benefits, and subsidized housing. Changing from a rural hukou to an urban one was tightly controlled and very rare until the 1980s. While reforms have relaxed these regulations in recent years, requirements for changing registration vary by location and can be very stringent in the largest cities. Likewise, urban-to-rural conversion is extremely difficult due to the land use rights associated with rural hukou.

Chinese nationals who acquire a foreign nationality are obliged to renounce their Chinese nationality, which also implies that their hukou is cancelled. However, high numbers of former Chinese citizens were reported who are reluctant to cancel their hukou due to the social benefits bound to it. Due to insufficient communication between the relevant authorities, such practice even allows these individuals to illegally reacquire Chinese nationality by applying for a Chinese passport on the basis of their hukou they did not cancel as required.

Chinese nationals of mainland China are required to register for Resident Identity Cards, eligible to hold People's Republic of China passports, and able to vote in direct elections for local People's Congresses or village committees. When temporarily visiting Hong Kong or Macau, mainland Chinese residents must obtain Two-way Permits from their local public security bureau authorities and have a valid exit endorsement. If permanently settling in either special administrative region, they may be approved for One-way Permits; such a permit is usually granted for family reunions, not for general immigration.

Despite nominal constitutional protections against arbitrary arrest and detention, law enforcement in mainland China may either detain any citizen or ban any citizen from leaving the country, even without the issuance of any formal arrest warrants or explicit authorization from judicial authorities. Political dissidents and their families are often subject to house arrest within the country. Invasive personal surveillance on the political dissidents, by the Chinese Communist Party, is conducted within the country and even abroad in foreign jurisdictions (with the assistance of foreign nationals). It has been observed that mainland authorities will occasionally perform extraordinary rendition on Chinese citizens, abducting individuals of interest who are overseas and forcibly returning them to China.

In regards to the scope of nationality as conducted in practice by the Chinese government, Foreign Policy Kris Cheng columnist has argued that "If you have ever held or could have held Chinese citizenship, you are a Chinese national unless Beijing decides you are not." The restrictions on the recognition of dual nationality in the eyes of the Chinese government has led to conflicting circumstances like those which Yuan Yang of Financial Times has cited in that the Chinese authorities in 2015 treating the case of the writer Gui Minhai as a Chinese national despite his additional Swedish citizenship. The subsequent detainment of the writer by Chinese authorities in China is highlighted by Yuan Yang as evidence that the Chinese state "muddies" the distinction between ethnicity and citizenship. Anthropologist Cathryn H. Clayton of the University of Hawaiʻi at Mānoa charges that, through the inherited position of Chinese governments since the late Qing, which instituted jus sanguinis as the basis for nationality, "the Chinese state has a penchant for overextending the principle of jus sanguinis—that is, for viewing everyone in the world who is of Chinese descent[...]as potential or actual national subjects[...]" and she observes that "Chinese nationality law, like most nationality laws worldwide, had no place for a group defined primarily by its mixedness.'

=== Hong Kong and Macau ===
Hong Kong and Macau permanent residents have the unrestricted right to live and work in their territories, but do not have automatic residence or employment rights in mainland China. The central government issues Home Return Permits to residents for travel purposes and Residence Permits, which allows them to access the same basic public services, employment benefits, and daily conveniences as mainland citizens, if they intend to reside or work in the mainland for longer than six months.

Chinese nationals with right of abode in these regions are eligible for Hong Kong or Macau Resident Identity Cards, able to hold Hong Kong Special Administrative Region passports or Macau Special Administrative Region passports, and may vote in elections for the Legislative Council of Hong Kong or Legislative Assembly of Macau.

=== Taiwan ===
Similar to Hong Kong and Macau residents, Taiwanese residents are issued Mainland Travel Permits to travel to mainland China, which allows them to stay indefinitely for any purpose, including working and studying. Additionally, similar to Hong Kong and Macau permanent residents, Residence Permits are issued if they intend to reside or work in the mainland for longer than six months. While they are also eligible to convert to mainland hukou and hold PRC passports, Taiwanese law automatically strips household registration from ROC nationals who convert to mainland hukou and are issued mainland passports without specific authorization from Taiwanese authorities.

== See also ==
- Visa policy of mainland China, Hong Kong, and Macau
- Visa requirements for Chinese citizens (of Hong Kong and Macau)
