= Exit permit =

Exit permit may refer to:

- An exit visa
- A One-way Permit, in China
