= Touch Base Policy =

Former British Hong Kong immigration policy

The Touch Base Policy (Chinese: 抵壘政策; also known as the Reached Base Policy) was an immigration policy in British Hong Kong from 1974 to 1980 towards the refugee wave from the People's Republic of China to British Hong Kong. Under the policy, illegal immigrants from China could stay in Hong Kong if they reached urban areas and found a home with their relatives or other forms of accommodation.

== Background ==
The British colony of Hong Kong was a migration hub due to regional instability from the Second Sino-Japanese War and Chinese Civil War. More than 6.3 million emigrants from China had travelled to other destinations through Hong Kong by 1939. Prior to the Sino-Japanese War, movement across the border between China and Hong Kong was largely unregulated, and Chinese immigrants were not required to carry travel documents. While many Chinese migrants travelled through Hong Kong, anti-Chinese sentiments in Southeast Asia and failed expeditions led others to settle in Hong Kong.

After the city's population was reduced to 600,000 by the end of the Japanese occupation of Hong Kong in 1945, it rebounded a year later to 1.6 million and to 2.36 million in 1950, due to the onset of the Cold War and the Communist Revolution in China. In early 1949, the Hong Kong government only allowed Chinese immigrants with entry permits to enter the city, except for those from Guangdong Province. All people also had to apply for identity cards.

Communist reforms and mass movements in China, such as the Great Leap Forward, also contributed to the Refugee wave from the People's Republic of China to British Hong Kong, despite the strengthening of border controls previously.

In an attempt to halt this influx of immigrants, a Frontier Closed Area was established by the Hong Kong Government along the border with China in June 1951, and expanded to its largest limit in 1962. Nonetheless, the influx of immigrants continued, especially during the Cultural Revolution. In response the Hong Kong Government adopted the Touch Base Policy in November 1974, which allowed immigrants from mainland China who reached the urban areas (reaching south of Boundary Street) and met their relatives to register for a Hong Kong Identity Card. Those who were intercepted in the Closed Area would be repatriated back to the Mainland immediately.

== End of the Policy ==
The Touch Base Policy did not halt the influx of immigrants and was abolished by the Hong Kong Government on 24 October 1980. Immigrants coming directly from the Mainland on or before 23 October 1980 were required to register for a Hong Kong Identity Card in a 3-day grace-period (24-26 of October 1980). Illegal immigrants arriving on or after 24 October 1980 were repatriated immediately, and it became compulsory for Hong Kong residents to carry their identity cards in public areas. Police will randomly check citizens' Hong Kong Identity Card for spotting out Mainland Chinese illegal immigrants, other than searching for other criminal suspects. That made the eligible immigrants who 'touched base' before the deadline rush to the Chinese Extension Section of the Immigration Department for identity registration.

== See also ==
- Refugee wave from the People's Republic of China to British Hong Kong
- Chinese emigration
- People's Republic of China Permit for Proceeding to Hong Kong and Macao
- Wet feet, dry feet policy (USA)
