= Taiwan, Hong Kong, and Macau administrative division codes of the PRC (Division 7 & 8) =

List of administrative division codes of the PRC in Division 7 and 8 or Taiwan Province (PRC), Hong Kong, and Macau.

== Taiwan (71) ==
While the administrative division code for Taiwan Province is 710000, Ministry of Public Security of People's Republic of China allocates 830000 as the administrative division code. The code 830000 is used in the first six digits of the permit number in the Taiwan resident residence permit of the People's Republic of China.

710000	Taiwan Province 台湾省
	Taipei city 台北市
	District 市辖区

== Hong Kong (81) ==
810000	Hong Kong SAR 香港特别行政区				
	District 区	Central and Western 中西区	Eastern 东区	Southern 南区	Wan Chai 湾仔区
	District 区	Sham Shui Po 深水埗区	Kowloon City 九龙城区	Kwun Tong 观塘区	Wong Tai Sin 黄大仙区
	District 区	Yau Tsim Mong 油尖旺区	Islands 离岛区	Kwai Tsing 葵青区	North 北区
	District 区	Sai Kung 西贡区	Sha Tin 沙田区	Tai Po 大埔区	Tsuen Wan 荃湾区
	District 区	Tuen Mun 屯门区	Yuen Long 元朗区		

== Macau (82) ==
820000	Macau SAR 澳门特别行政区				
	Freguesia 堂区	Nossa Senhora de Fátima 花地玛堂区	Santo António 花王堂区	São Lázaro 望德堂区	Sé 大堂区
	Freguesia 堂区	São Lourenço 风顺堂区	Nossa Senhora do Carmo 嘉模堂区	São Francisco Xavier 圣方济各堂区	Cotai 路氹堂区
