= Mainland Travel Permit for Hong Kong and Macao Resident =

Travel document

Mainland Travel Permit for Hong Kong and Macao Residents 港澳居民来往内地通行证
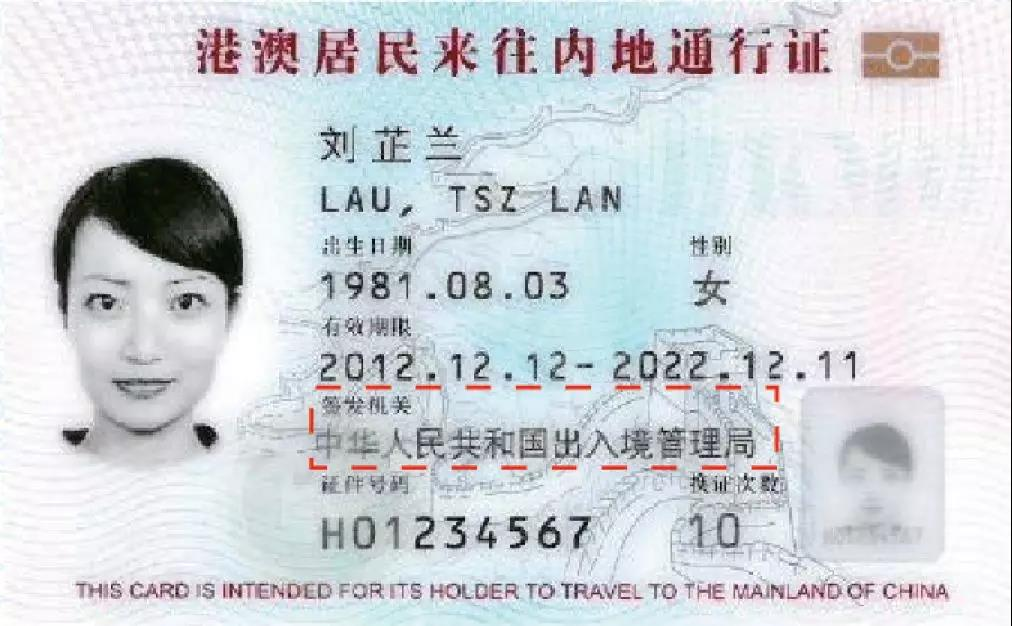
- The front of the current permit for Chinese citizens (since 2019)
- Type: Travel document and identity document
- Issued by: (China) National Immigration Administration
- First issued: Chinese citizens January 15, 1999; Non-Chinese citizens July 10, 2024
- Purpose: Travel to Mainland China
- Valid in: China
- Eligibility: Permanent residents of Hong Kong and Macau
- Expiration: Chinese citizens: 1. 10 years (over 18 years old); 2. 5 years (under 18 years old); Non-Chinese citizens: 1. 5 years (all cases)
- Cost: HK$260–780 (depends on the validity period of the document being applied for and whether it is a replacement for a lost or damaged document)

Mainland Travel Permit for Hong Kong and Macao Resident
- Traditional Chinese: 港澳居民來往內地通行證
- Simplified Chinese: 港澳居民来往内地通行证
Transcriptions
Standard Mandarin
- Hanyu Pinyin: Gǎng'ào jūmín láiwǎng nèidì tōngxíngzhèng
Yue: Cantonese
- Yale Romanization: Góng·Ou gēuimàhn lòihwóhng noihdeih tūnghàhngjing
- Jyutping: Gong2ou3 geoi1man4 loi4wong5 noi6dei6 tung1hang4zing3
- IPA: [kɔ̌ːŋ.ōu kɵ́y.mɐ̏n lɔ̏ːy.wɔ̬ːŋ nɔ̀ːy.tèi tʰóŋ.hɐ̏ŋ.tsēŋ]

Home Return Permit
- Traditional Chinese: 回鄉證
- Simplified Chinese: 回乡证
Transcriptions
Standard Mandarin
- Hanyu Pinyin: Huíxiāngzhèng
Yue: Cantonese
- Yale Romanization: Wùihhēungjing
- Jyutping: Wui4hoeng1zing3
- IPA: [wȕːy hœ́ːŋ tsēŋ]

Mainland Travel Permit for Hong Kong and Macao Residents (non-Chinese Citizens)
- Traditional Chinese: 港澳居民往來內地通行證（非中國籍）
- Simplified Chinese: 港澳居民往来内地通行证（非中国籍）
Transcriptions
Standard Mandarin
- Hanyu Pinyin: Gǎng'ào jūmín wǎnglái nèidì tōngxíngzhèng (fēi zhōngguó jí)

The Mainland Travel Permit for Hong Kong and Macao Residents (colloquially referred to as the Home Return Permit, Home Visit Permit or Home Visit Card) is a travel document issued by the Exit and Entry Administration of the People's Republic of China. This card-sized biometric document is issued to Chinese citizens with permanent residency in Hong Kong or Macao for travel to Mainland China. Bearers can stay in Mainland China indefinitely for any purpose, including work and study, without restrictions. The validity period for the card is 10 years for cardholders 18 years old or over, or 5 years for cardholders under 18 years old.

The Mainland Travel Permit for Hong Kong and Macao Resident (Non-Chinese Citizens), introduced on 1 July 2024, is issued to foreign nationals with permanent residency in Hong Kong or Macao for short-term personal travel to Mainland China. Holders can enter Mainland China and stay for up to 90 days per entry. However, cardholders are not permitted to work, study, or engage in activities such as news reporting and voting while in Mainland China. The card is valid for 5 years. Holders of the permit may, having fulfilled certain conditions, use the e-Channel when entering or exiting mainland China.

== Appearance and eligibility ==
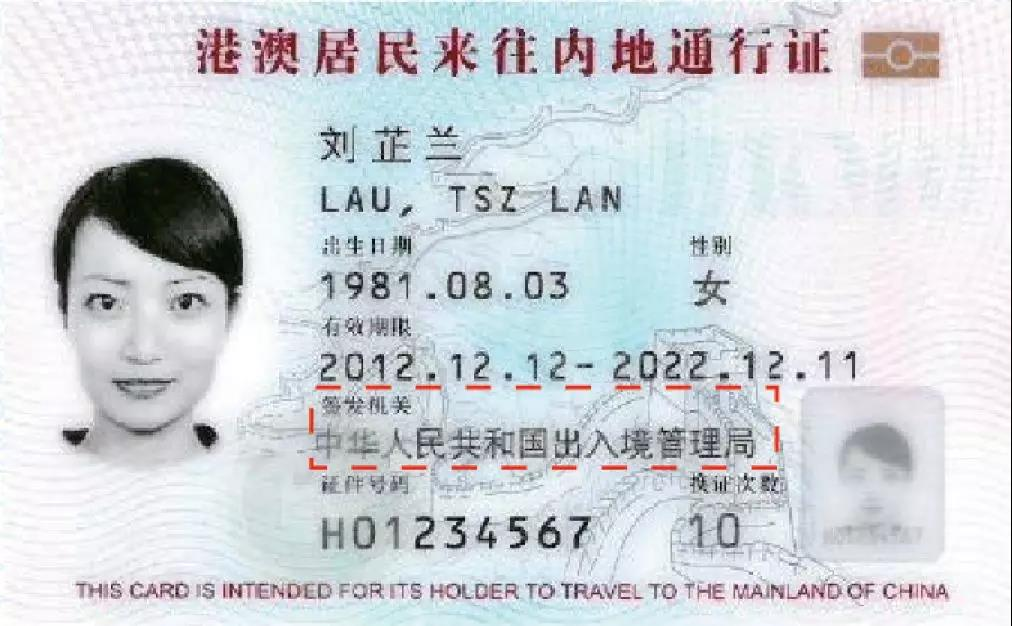
The front of the current permit for Chinese citizens (since 2019)

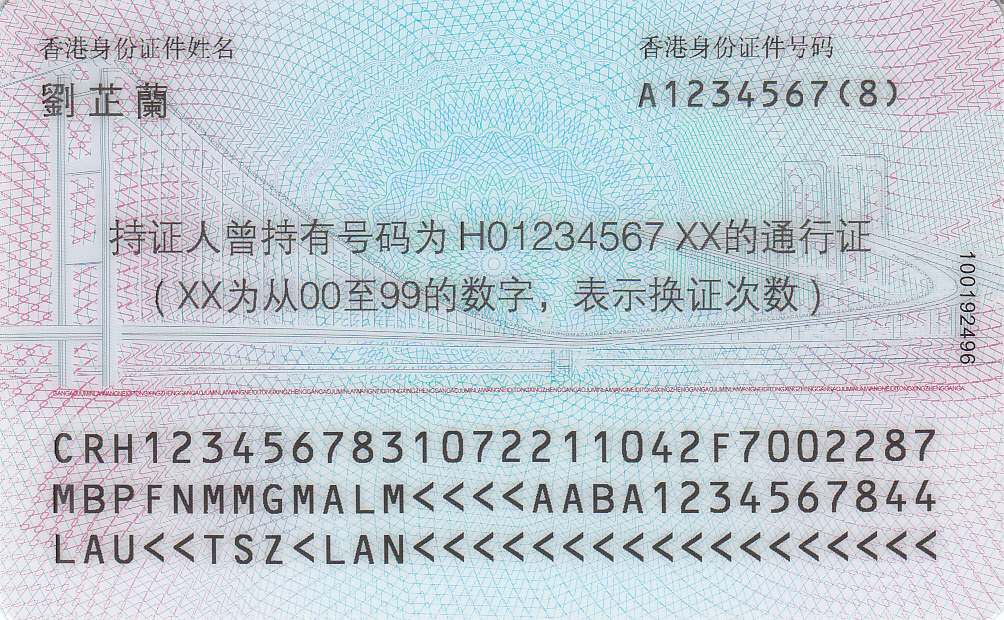
The reverse of the current permit for Chinese citizens (since 2013)

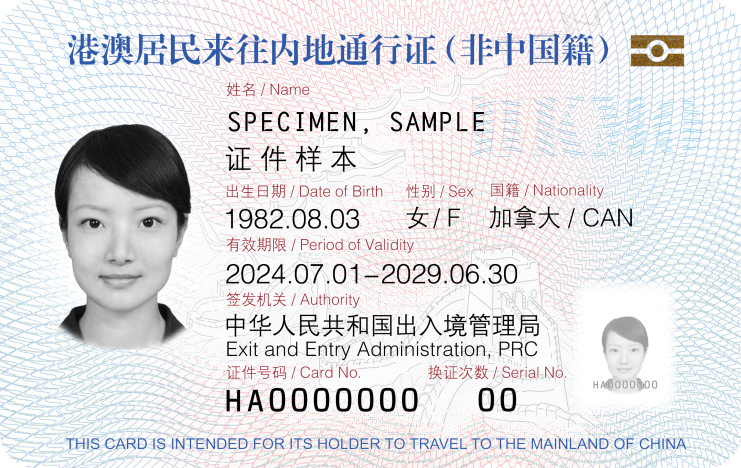
The front of the current permit for non-Chinese citizens (since 2024)

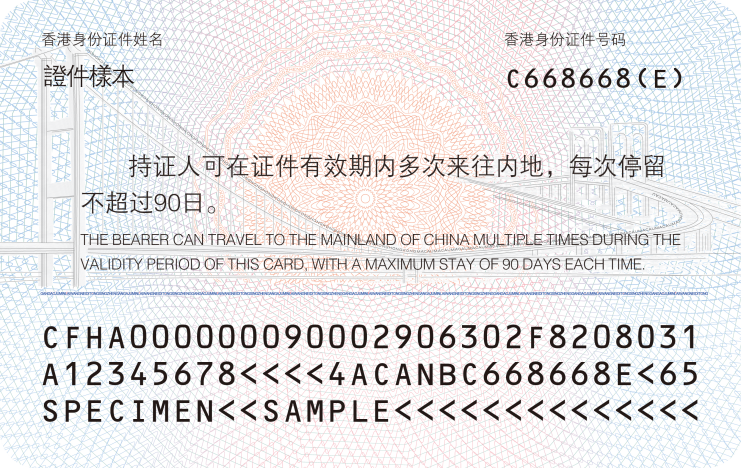
The reverse of the current permit for non-Chinese citizens (since 2024)

The permits are credit card-sized, allowing them to be carried in a wallet. The older permit is also machine-readable, allowing holders to enter Mainland China at any staffed immigration checkpoint or through self-service immigration gates along the Hong Kong-Shenzhen boundary, at the Hong Kong-Zhuhai-Macao Bridge Zhuhai-Macao Port, as well as at international airports throughout Mainland China. These gates scan the permits with an optical reader and use the software to verify biometric data, such as thumbprints and facial recognition, against a central database. Once the inspection is complete, the individual is granted entry.

Starting from 2 January 2013, a new version of the permit was introduced with an updated design which includes a biometric chip, similar to those used on biometric passports. The permit's numbering system was also revised; the former 11-digit format was restructured into a 9-digit number accompanied by a separate 2-digit issuance sequence number. An English description was added, which reads: "This card is intended for its holder to travel to the Mainland of China." The Simplified Chinese name of the holder, as shown on their Hong Kong or Macau Identity Card, appears on the front of the permit, whereas the original Traditional Chinese name appears on the back. The issuing authority of the permit was changed from the Public Security Bureau of Guangdong to the Bureau of Exit and Entry Administration of the Ministry of Public Security.

The Mainland Travel Permit for Hong Kong and Macao Residents is issued to:

- Permanent residents of Hong Kong or Macau who are Chinese nationals by birth or naturalization in these regions.
- Mainland residents authorized to immigrate to Hong Kong or Macau who have since established residency (one-way permit holders).
- Permanent residents of Hong Kong or Macau born outside these regions who possess Chinese nationality by birth, descent, or naturalization.

The permit is issued by the Exit and Entry Administration of the Ministry of Public Security. Applications for the Mainland Travel Permit must be submitted at the China Travel Service branch in Hong Kong, Macau, or Mainland China. Renewals may be processed in any of these locations, but it is not possible to apply for or renew the permit outside of these regions. Hong Kong and Macau permanent residents residing abroad can be issued Chinese Travel Documents, albeit with a shorter validity period.

As of 1 July 2024, a similar permit known as the Mainland Travel Permit for Hong Kong and Macao Resident (Non-Chinese Citizens) was made available to non-Chinese permanent residents of Hong Kong and Macau, allowing the holder to enter Mainland China for a period of up to 90 days. Holders of these permits may engage in tourism or business but are not allowed to pursue study or employment in mainland China. Permits issued to foreign permanent residents of Hong Kong and Macau have card numbers starting with HA and MA respectively, and are visually different from the ones issued to Chinese nationals. They are labeled in both simplified Chinese and English, and include a note that indicates the maximum duration of stay (90 days) allowed for foreign nationals on the reverse.

Most permits for adults are valid for 10 years. Permits for minors under 18 years old are valid for five years. Temporary permits are issued for certain reasons, such as when a person's permit has expired and the replacement has not arrived. There have been instances of limited single and double-entry home visit permits issued due to political reasons. Permits issued to foreign nationals are valid for 5 years.

== History ==
Before the handover of Hong Kong and Macau, "home-return permits" were issued to any ethnic Chinese people in those territories.

Prior to 1999, those permits were named Home-visiting Certificate for Compatriots from Hong Kong and Macau and were passport-like booklets. These booklets were considered inconvenient because they were relatively cumbersome to carry around. Furthermore, the booklets were also found to be inefficient because they could only be used at staffed border crossing checkpoints where an entry stamp would be placed by an immigration official. Frequent border crossing residents, such as lorry/truck drivers, were required to replace the booklet every few months due to the lack of pages for entry and exit stamps. The booklets were eventually phased out.

In 1999, the permit was changed into its current credit card-like form, and the official name was changed to the current name, following the handover of both territories. A new version came to circulation in 2013 with enhanced security features and an embedded biometric chip.

On 1 July 2024, the National Immigration Administration announced the introduction of the Mainland Travel Permit for Hong Kong and Macao Resident (non-Chinese Citizens), a similar travel document which can be issued to non-Chinese permanent residents of Hong Kong and Macau. The announcement coincided with the 27th anniversary of the establishment of the Hong Kong Special Administrative Region.

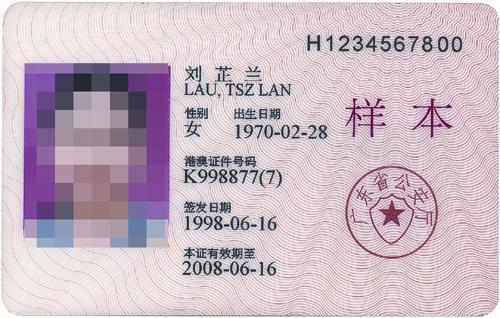
Previous version of Home Return Permit, issued from 1999 to 2012 (for adults).

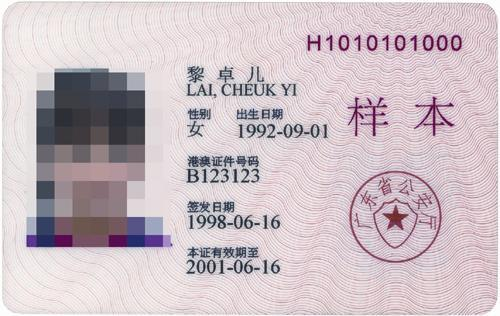
Previous version of Home Return Permit, issued from 1999 to 2012 (for children under 18).

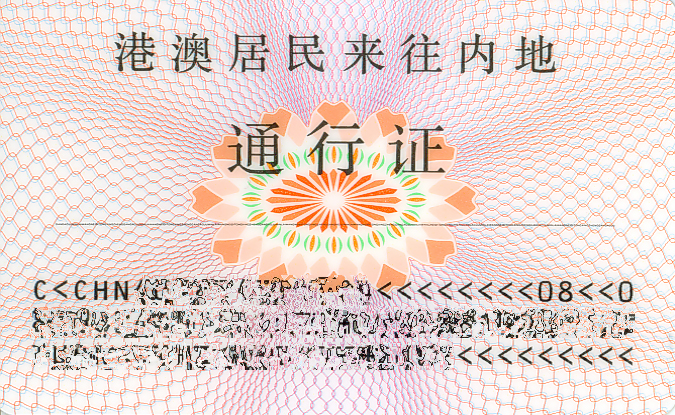
Reverse side of the previous version of Home Return Permit, issued from 1999 to 2012

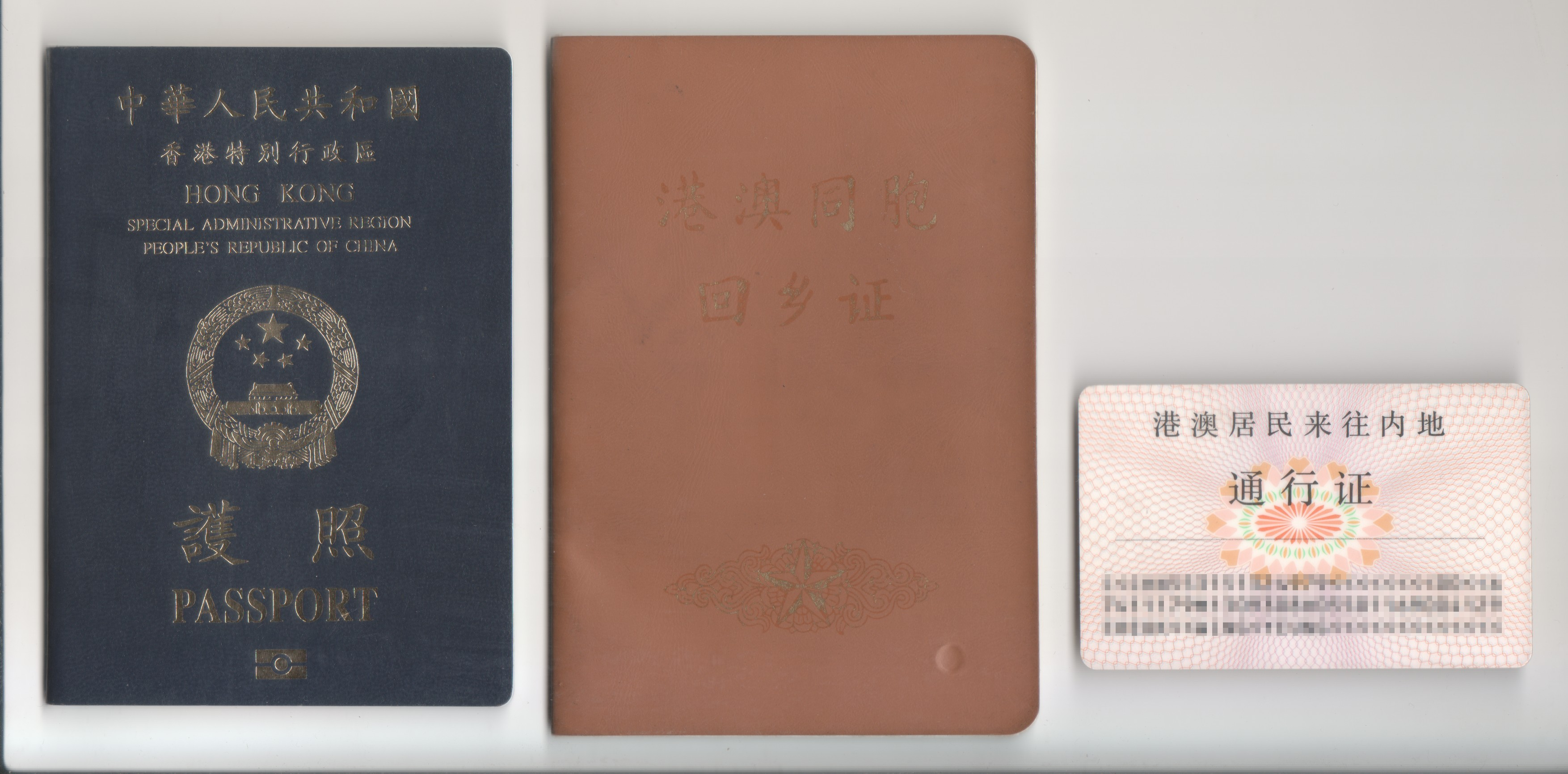
From left to right: HKSAR passport, Home Return Permit (cancelled), and the 1999 version of the permit

== Requirements when staying in Mainland China ==
Holders of the standard Home Return Permit are able to freely enter Mainland China for all purposes within the validity of their travel document, regardless of whether the point of origin is Hong Kong, Macau, or overseas.

Holders of the Home Return Permit (non-Chinese citizens) may enter Mainland China for a period of up to 90 days for the purpose of business or tourism; holders of these permits are not allowed to pursue study or employment in mainland China.

Those residing in the Mainland for more than six months may optionally apply for the Residence Permit for Hong Kong, Macao, and Taiwan Residents.

== Applying for a Home Return Permit ==
The China Travel Service (CTS) is the sole agency authorized by the Public Security Bureau (PSB) to provide services to help accept applications in Hong Kong and Macau. However, the PSB of Guangdong processes all applications and issues the permit on behalf of the Ministry of Public Security.

Holders of a Home Return Permit in Mainland who have lost it can apply for a temporary replacement at the CTS branch in Huanggang. However, they must apply for a new Home Return Permit upon their return to Hong Kong or Macau with the CTS.

Hong Kong and Macau Chinese Nationals in foreign countries, who do not already have a Home Return Permit, can apply to their local Chinese foreign mission for a passport-like Chinese Travel Document to visit Mainland China.

== Nationality of holders ==
A home return permit issued to a Chinese national constitutes proof of Chinese nationality in Mainland China. Its status in Hong Kong law is less clear, due to the principle of one country, two systems and the designation of the Hong Kong Immigration Department as the competent authority to determine matters under the Chinese Nationality Law relating to Hong Kong permanent residents. As Vice-president of the Court of Appeal Wally Yeung wrote:

Mr. Pun has also emphasized that the fact that Yiu Hon holds a Home Visit Permit shows that the Chinese Government recognises Yiu Hon has the status as a Chinese national. I do not understand the principle on which the Chinese Government issued Yiu Hon a Home Visit Permit. However, under the principle of one country, two systems, the Government of the Hong Kong Special Administrative Region will not be subject to the decision of the Chinese Government on the above question. The Court shall decide whether or not Yiu Hon is still a 'Chinese national' in accordance with the Chinese Nationality Law and related provisions. The fact that Yiu Hon holds a Home Visit Permit has no direct bearing or significance on the matter in question.

Furthermore, not all Chinese nationals in Hong Kong or Macau have a Home Return Permit. Unlike the compulsory Hong Kong Identity Card or Macau Resident Identity Card, application for a Home Return Permit is voluntary. Those who do not apply for the Permit are still eligible for an HKSAR passport issued by the Immigration Department of Hong Kong, or an MSAR passport by the Identification Services Bureau of Macau. The SAR passports are only issued to Chinese nationals with the right of abode in Hong Kong or Macau. The HKSAR passport or MSAR passport allows the holder to travel to other countries and regions, but it may not be used for travelling to Hong Kong/Macau (except transit). The HKSAR passport or MSAR passport is also used as a travel document for travel to Taiwan in conjunction with the Exit and Entry Permit issued by the government of Republic of China. Chinese nationals holding an HKSAR passport cannot use it to enter Mainland China, and the HKSAR Government has stated that "in line with the one country principle, it was considered inappropriate to adopt HKSAR passport as a travel document to enter Mainland China."

Likewise, the Home Return Permit cannot be used to enter Hong Kong or Macau, and residents are required to use their Hong Kong Identity Card or a Macau Resident Identity Card.

Home Return Permits issued to foreign nationals state their nationality.

=== Issues faced by foreign passport holders ===
Besides BN(O) status, British citizenship and Chinese nationality, many residents of Hong Kong have obtained citizenship in countries such as Australia, Canada, or the United States. If they have not made a "declaration of change of nationality" at the Immigration Department of Hong Kong, they are regarded by the Chinese authorities as Chinese nationals. In this case, they can use their Home Return Permits to enter Mainland China instead of their foreign passports. They are not entitled to foreign consular protection in China. As of 2025, permanent residents of Hong Kong who do not have Chinese citizenship are allowed to apply for a permit to visit the Mainland China for up to 90 days, for everything other than to work, study, or claim benefits.

== Incidents ==
=== Ching Cheong ===
In 2005, Ching Cheong, a Hong Kong-based journalist of the Singapore-based newspaper The Straits Times, was arrested by the Chinese Ministry of State Security and was accused of stealing "state secrets". The correspondent entered Mainland China with his Home Return Permit while holding a BN(O) passport. Since he is both a Chinese national, a British National (Overseas), as well as a permanent resident of Singapore, organisations like the Hong Kong Journalists' Association and Reporters Without Borders, urged the British Foreign Secretary Jack Straw to intervene. The British Foreign and Commonwealth Office said it had no plans to comment on the case. British officials have indicated that if there were any representations to be made, they would take place behind the scenes. A London spokesperson confirmed: "We can offer consular assistance but we cannot interfere in the legal affairs of another country." The Chinese Central People's Government never recognized any British National (Overseas) status, and stated that its nationals from Hong Kong cannot enjoy foreign consular protection on Chinese soil on the basis of holding foreign passports. The Foreign Secretary of the United Kingdom stated that "Mr Ching is a British National (Overseas) passport holder and we have pressed the central authorities for information on the circumstances of his arrest and will continue to seek consular access as a matter of urgency, which so far has been denied." There were other cases that the British Government was asked to assist BN(O) passport holders detained in Mainland China.

=== Pro-democracy politicians ===
Before the handover, some pro-democracy Hong Kong politicians, such as Margaret Ng, Emily Lau and Christine Loh attempted to use their British citizen passports to enter Mainland China because they were denied a Home Return Permit, hence denied entry to Mainland China. Those politicians, however, are still Chinese nationals under the Chinese nationality law; acquisition of Chinese nationality of ethnic Chinese residents born in Hong Kong is involuntary, although they may choose to relinquish their Chinese nationality if they hold citizenship of other countries, except for the British National (Overseas) status and the British citizenship obtained in the British Nationality Selection Scheme.

Albert Ho, who had his Home Return Permit cancelled by the Central government, ran for Chief Executive in 2012. During the election campaign, Henry Tang pledged that if he became the next Chief Executive, he would talk to Beijing to secure a new permit for Albert Ho. Leung Chun-ying gave a more generic response that did not answer to Ho specifically, and said if he became the next Chief Executive, he would welcome anyone to seek his help.

=== Umbrella movement ===
Three members of the Hong Kong Federation of Students led by Alex Chow, who had booked air tickets to Beijing to put their case in front of the national leadership during the 2014 Hong Kong protests, found out through airline agents that Chinese authorities had revoked their Home Return Permit, effectively banning them from traveling to Mainland. No official notification of the revocation or explanation of the grounds for their cancellation was ever made to the holders.

=== Lee Bo ===
In 2016, issues regarding the disappearances of Lee Bo, the owner of Causeway Bay Books, were raised by British Foreign Secretary Philip Hammond as Lee is a British citizen with a Home Return Permit who was later confirmed to have been extradited from Hong Kong by Chinese law enforcement officials. Hammond demanded that the Chinese government launch a thorough investigation regarding the breach of independent jurisdiction rights enjoyed by Hong Kong. The Chinese Foreign Minister Wang Yi responded by saying that China would refuse to do so because Lee is, "first and foremost, a Chinese citizen (national)" under the Chinese nationality law and the Basic Law of Hong Kong, therefore the British government would have no say on internal affairs of China. This case came under international attention because, unlike Ching Cheong, Lee was neither arrested nor had any charges against him in Mainland China, and his British citizen status, unlike Ching's BN(O), was recognized by the Chinese government.

== See also ==
- Mainland Travel Permit for Taiwan Residents
- People's Republic of China Exit-Entry Permit for Traveling to and from Hong Kong and Macau
- Residence Permit for Hong Kong, Macao, and Taiwan Residents
- Hong Kong Special Administrative Region passport
- Macao Special Administrative Region passport
- Exit & Entry Permit
- British nationality law and Hong Kong
- Portuguese nationality law
- Chinese nationality law
- Foreign relations of Hong Kong
- Foreign relations of Macau

== Bibliography ==
- Book in Chinese: 張勇、陳玉田：《香港居民的國籍問題》（出版社：三聯書店（香港））456
