= Taiwan resident =

Term used by the government of China

According to the legal system and government documents of the People's Republic of China, the term "Taiwan residents" (Chinese: 台湾地区居民; pinyin: Táiwān dìqū jūmín) refers to Chinese citizens who reside in the Taiwan Area. Their legal status and management are similar to those of Hong Kong residents and Macao residents, so the three are collectively referred to as "Hong Kong, Macao and Taiwan residents".

After the founding of the People's Republic of China in 1949, based on its one-China principle, the PRC asserted it was the only legitimate representative of China, and considered Taiwan as the territory of the People's Republic of China, and legally recognized the residents of Taiwan as Chinese citizens. The People's Republic of China does not recognize the existence of the Republic of China and its citizenships. In the political customs of the People's Republic of China, words related to the Republic of China after the founding of the People's Republic of China are prohibited words. In 1991, the People's Republic of China law first used the term "Taiwanese residents", and it has been used in many normative documents involving Taiwan since then. The usage of this term is similar to that of "Taiwan compatriots" and "Taiwanese people", but not exactly the same as its usage by the Republic of China government, which actually controls Taiwan, which defines it as the citizens of the Republic of China with Taiwan household registration.

== Background ==
In 1949, the People's Republic of China was established and the Republic of China government retreated to Taiwan, thus forming a division between the two sides of the Taiwan Strait. The People's Republic of China government adheres to the one-China principle and asserts that the Republic of China was abolished in 1949, and that the sovereignty of Taiwan belongs to China and is the territory of the People's Republic of China, which is written into the Constitution of the People's Republic of China. Therefore, in principle, citizens of the Republic of China residing in Taiwan have Chinese nationality, are citizens of the People's Republic of China, and are subject to the Chinese nationality law, but in practice, special handling is required. The People's Republic of China government uses legal documents issued by the Republic of China government, such as Taiwan passports, national identification cards and household registration transcripts as the qualification for residents of Taiwan.

== Use ==
Taiwanese residents entering mainland China need to hold a Mainland Travel Permit for Taiwan Residents. Taiwanese residents with foreign nationality need to use their foreign passports to apply for Chinese visas. Those who reside in mainland China for a long time can obtain a residence permit for Hong Kong, Macao and Taiwan residents.

In the Regulations on the Administration of Travel Between Chinese Citizens and Taiwan formulated in 1991, Taiwan residents were defined as "Chinese citizens residing in Taiwan". Ji Ye, a researcher of the People's Republic of China, pointed out that this was "the first time that the concept of 'Taiwan residents' replaced 'Taiwan compatriots", and "this concept has been used in a large number of normative documents related to Taiwan since then". The researcher believes that the use of the term "Taiwan residents" has two connotations: first, "to confirm that (the vast majority) Taiwan residents are also Chinese citizens and have Chinese nationality"; second, to establish a control standard for the first time, that is, to distinguish between people on both sides of the strait by the standard of "place of residence", so as to meet the need for legal control of personnel exchanges; and in practice, the determination of place of residence is linked to household registration, and Taiwan residents actually refer to Chinese citizens who have established household registration in Taiwan. In the Interim Measures for the Administration of Marriage Registration between Mainland Residents and Taiwan Residents issued in 1998, "Taiwan residents" refers to "Chinese citizens residing in Taiwan, China".

In the Regulations on the Issuance and Management of Travel Permits for Taiwan Residents to the Mainland formulated in 2015, "Taiwan residents" refers to "Chinese citizens who have household registration in Taiwan but not in the mainland". For those who do not have household registration in Taiwan, i.e., Taiwanese citizens without household registration, whether they are treated as ordinary "Taiwan residents" varies in practice. The relevant service guidelines of the Fujian Provincial Public Security Department may not include Taiwanese citizens without household registration in Taiwan. The relevant service guidelines of the National Immigration Administration's government service platform state that "those whose parents are both Taiwanese residents, who were born in the mainland, and who have obtained a permit to enter Taiwan" are "Taiwan citizens without household registration in Taiwan" as defined by the Republic of China and can apply for a Taiwan Compatriot Permit in the same way as Taiwanese residents. In the Measures for Applying for and Issuing Residence Permits for Hong Kong, Macao and Taiwan Residents formulated in 2018, "Taiwan residents" refers to "Chinese citizens who reside in Taiwan and do not have mainland household registration".

In the 1990s, after Hong Kong and Macao returned to China, they also followed the one-China principle of the central government. The Hong Kong Immigration Department website uses the term "Taiwan residents" or "Taiwanese residents of Chinese descent".
