= Hong Kong and Macao Travel Permit =

Chinese travel document to travel to Hong Kong or Macau

Hong Kong and Macao Travel Permit 往来港澳通行证
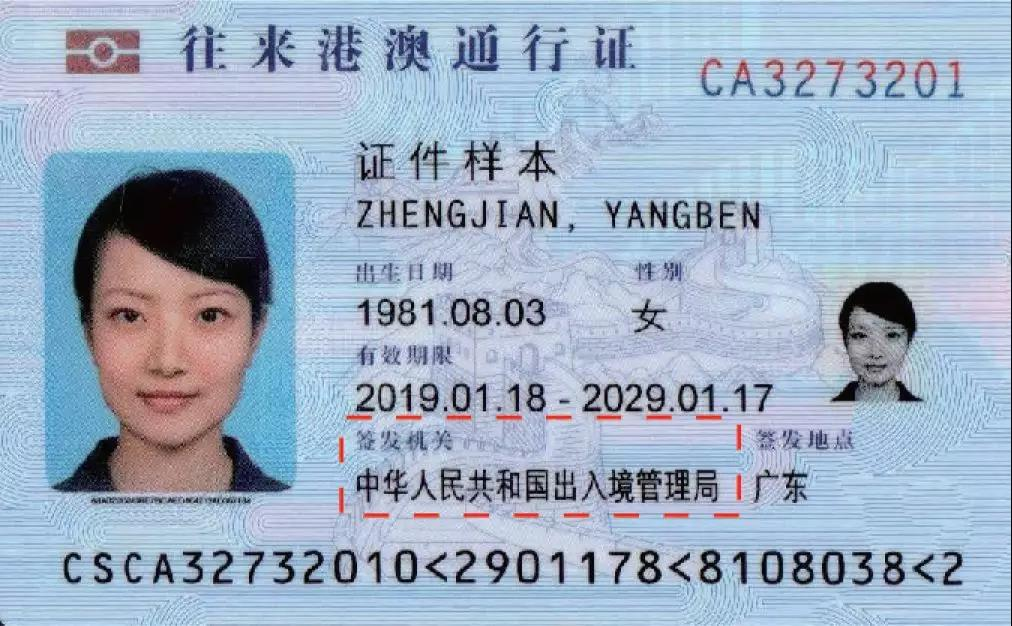
- Biometric permit (front side)
- Type: Travel document
- Issued by: China
- Eligibility: Chinese citizens residing in Mainland China
- Expiration: 5 years (for people under 16 years old when applying); 10 years (for people aged 16 or over when applying)
- Cost: ¥60

Hong Kong and Macao Travel Permit

Chinese name
- Simplified Chinese: 往来港澳通行证
Transcriptions
Standard Mandarin
- Hanyu Pinyin: wǎnglái gǎngào tōngxíngzhèng

Portuguese name
- Portuguese: Salvo-conduto de “ida e volta” para Hong Kong e Macau

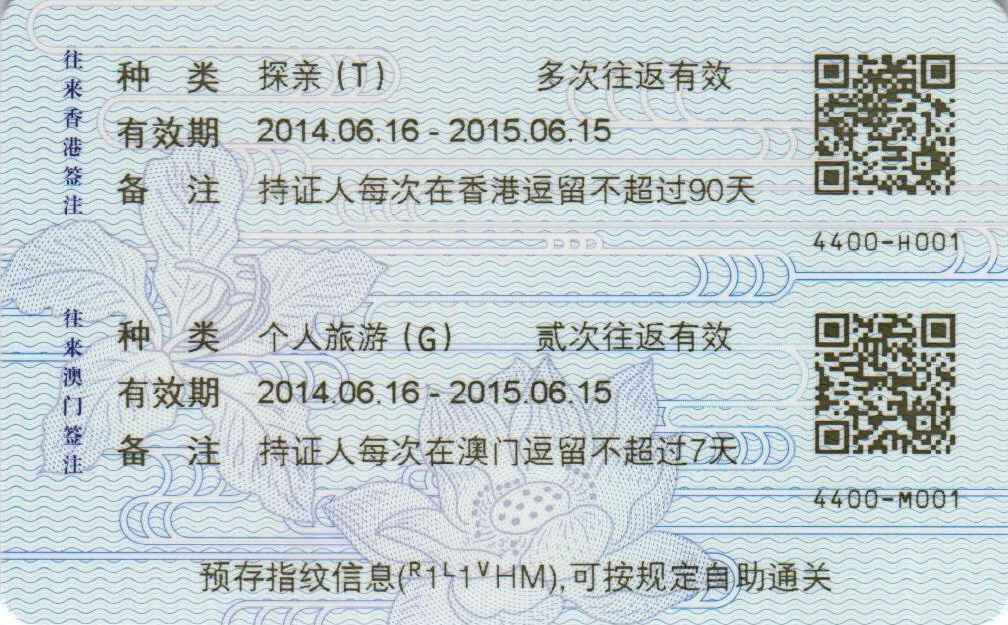
Exit endorsements are located on the back of the Biometric Two-way Permits.

The Hong Kong and Macao Travel Permit (alternatively known as the Exit-Entry Permit for Travelling to and from Hong Kong and Macao; colloquially as Two-way Permit or EEP) is a travel document issued by the Exit and Entry Administration of the People's Republic of China. This card-size biometric document is issued to Chinese citizens residing in the mainland for traveling to and returning from Hong Kong and Macau for personal purposes.

Due to the "One country, two systems" policy, Hong Kong, Macau and mainland Chinese residents who are Chinese citizens cannot use their Chinese, Hong Kong, or Macau passports to enter their respective territories normally, even though those passports are considered legally valid travel documents. The Two-way Permit is the sole travel document for personal visit, family reunion, business, and other non-government purposes to and from the two Chinese Special Administrative Regions. Exceptions are Mainland residents who are transiting to or from a third country or region, as they can use their Chinese passports when entering Hong Kong or Macau for a stay of seven days.

== Physical appearance ==
The new version of the permit is changed to a credit-card sized document, which also contains a biometric chip, and was first introduced in Guangdong on May 20, 2014, and later issued nationally on September 15, 2014. The design is similar to the Taiwan Compatriot Permit but the card's color scheme is in light blue. The personal data are directly imprinted on the front of the card while the back of the card contains heat-sensitive ink which are used to print entry endorsements.

Previous version of the permit is a passport-like booklet format, with a blue cover and the National Emblem of the People's Republic of China in gold. The words "中华人民共和国" (People's Republic of China) and "往来港澳通行证" (Exit-Entry Permit for Travelling to and from Hong Kong and Macau) are displayed in simplified Chinese characters. The booklet-type permit has 32 pages for entry endorsements, and the biodata page, with the machine-readable code, is located in the back cover, unlike Chinese passports. All personal data are printed solely in Simplified Chinese, with only the name of the holder transcribed into Pinyin.

== Issuing process ==
Two-way Permits are issued, just like the Chinese passport, by local Exit and Entry Administrations (EEA) of local Public Security Bureaus (PSB) of their places of residence. Mainland residents must apply for a new permit in person, while exit endorsements can be obtained either through the automatic endorsement machine located in EEA offices or by mail for persons residing in Guangdong. Exit endorsements are not issued to a permit with a remaining validity of less than three months.

== Types of exit endorsement for Two-way Permit ==
In general, a Mainland resident who is in possession of a valid EEP bearing a valid exit endorsement (往来港澳签注) may exit mainland China and land in Hong Kong and Macau, with a limit of stay in accordance with the exit endorsement, provided that normal immigration requirements are met. The number of journeys permitted to Hong Kong and Macau are stated in the exit endorsement, i.e. single-journey, double-journey or multiple-journey; and every endorsement has a "valid for/until" date, which refers to the expiry of endorsement and shall not be confused with the length of stay. There are seven types of exit endorsements issued by National Immigration Administration:

- 个人旅游 G (individual visits): valid for 3 month or 1 year, single- or double- journey (double- journey endorsements to Hong Kong only), maximum 7 days per visit; Shenzhen residents can have a special 1 year multiple-journey endorsement to Hong Kong (a maximum 1 visit per week limit was imposed on April 13, 2015, and canceled on December 1, 2024). Since January 1, 2025, Zhuhai residents can have a special 1 year multiple-journey endorsement to Macau, which is maximum 1 visit per week (no limits visit for Hengqin residents). This type of exit endorsement is only issued to people who have hukou in 59 cities. Since January 28, 2020, issuing of G endorsement is suspended due to COVID-19 pandemic, but the issuing of the endorsements to Macau is resumed on August 12, 2020. The issuing of G endorsements is resumed since January 8, 2023.
- 探亲 T (family reunion): to visit a sibling: valid for 3 months, single journey, maximum 14 days; to visit a parent/parent-in-law or child: ibid, or valid for 3 months, multi-entry, maximum stay 90 days.
- 商务 S (business purpose): valid for 3 months or one year, maximum 14 days per visit. Since February 7, 2020, issuing of S endorsement is suspended due to COVID-19 pandemic, but the issuing of S endorsements to Hong Kong is resumed on October 11, 2021, in Guangdong. The issuing of S endorsements is resumed since January 8, 2023. Since May 6, 2024, all new S endorsements' period of stay are extended from 7 days to 14 days.
- 团队旅游 L (tour group): valid for 3 months or 1 year, single- or double- journey (double- journey endorsements to Hong Kong only), maximum 7 days per visit. Since January 28, 2020, issuing of L endorsement is suspended due to COVID-19 pandemic, but the issuing of the endorsements to Macau is resumed on August 12, 2020. The issuing of L endorsements is resumed since January 8, 2023. Since May 6, 2024, the endorsements for Hengqin and Macau tour groups is introduced.
- 逗留 D (multiple exits and entries): maximum stay authorized by respective SAR immigration officers.
- 其他 Q (other purposes of visit): valid for 3 months or 1 year, single- or double- journey, maximum 14 days per visit.
- 人才 R (talents): valid for 5 years (excellent talents) or 3 years (science and research, cultural and education, or health talents) or 1 year (law or other talents), multiple- journey, maximum 30 days per visit. The issuing of R endorsements is started from February 20, 2023, in 9 mainland cities in the Guangdong–Hong Kong–Macao Greater Bay Area, which is opened for talents working in these cities. Since May 6, 2024, talents working in Beijing and Shanghai are eligible to apply R endorsement. Since November 5, 2025, talents working in the entire Yangtze River Delta, Beijing-Tianjin-Hebei regions and all Pilot Free Trade Zones are eligible to apply R endorsement.

In addition, 奥运 A was a specially designated endorsement for 90-day multi-entry during the 2008 Summer Olympics in Beijing.

Women who are more than 28 weeks pregnant and suspected to be entering Hong Kong to give birth must show a booking confirmation at a Hong Kong hospital.

Exit endorsements issued to the booklet-type permit are affixed on one of the endorsement pages, similar to visas, while card-type permits have the information stored in the chip. The heat-sensitive ink in the back of the card ensures that the exit endorsements are visible to human eyes and can be re-printed by the special printer after the endorsement is used or invalid.

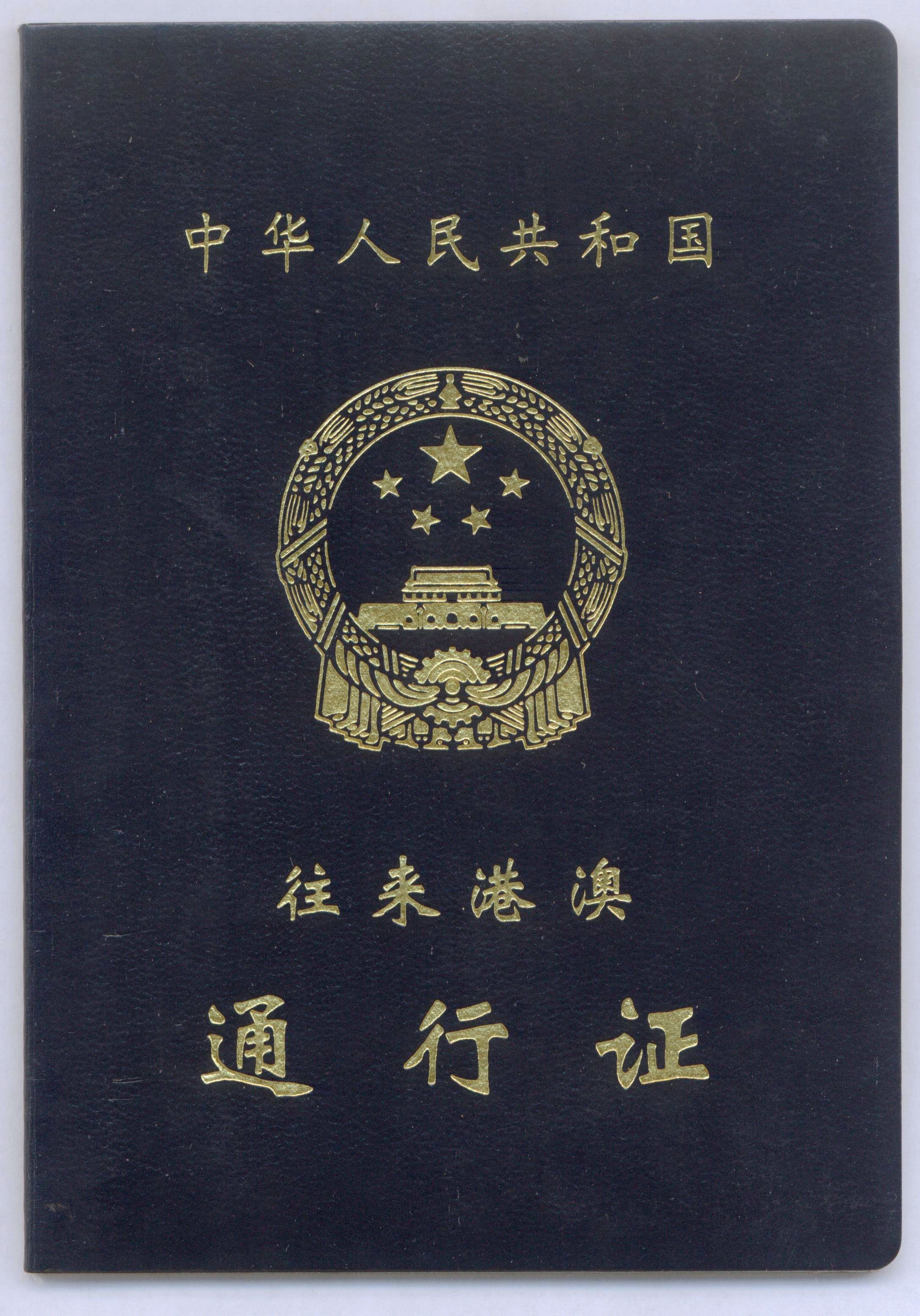
Booklet-type Two-way Permit (issued from 2000 until September 15, 2014)

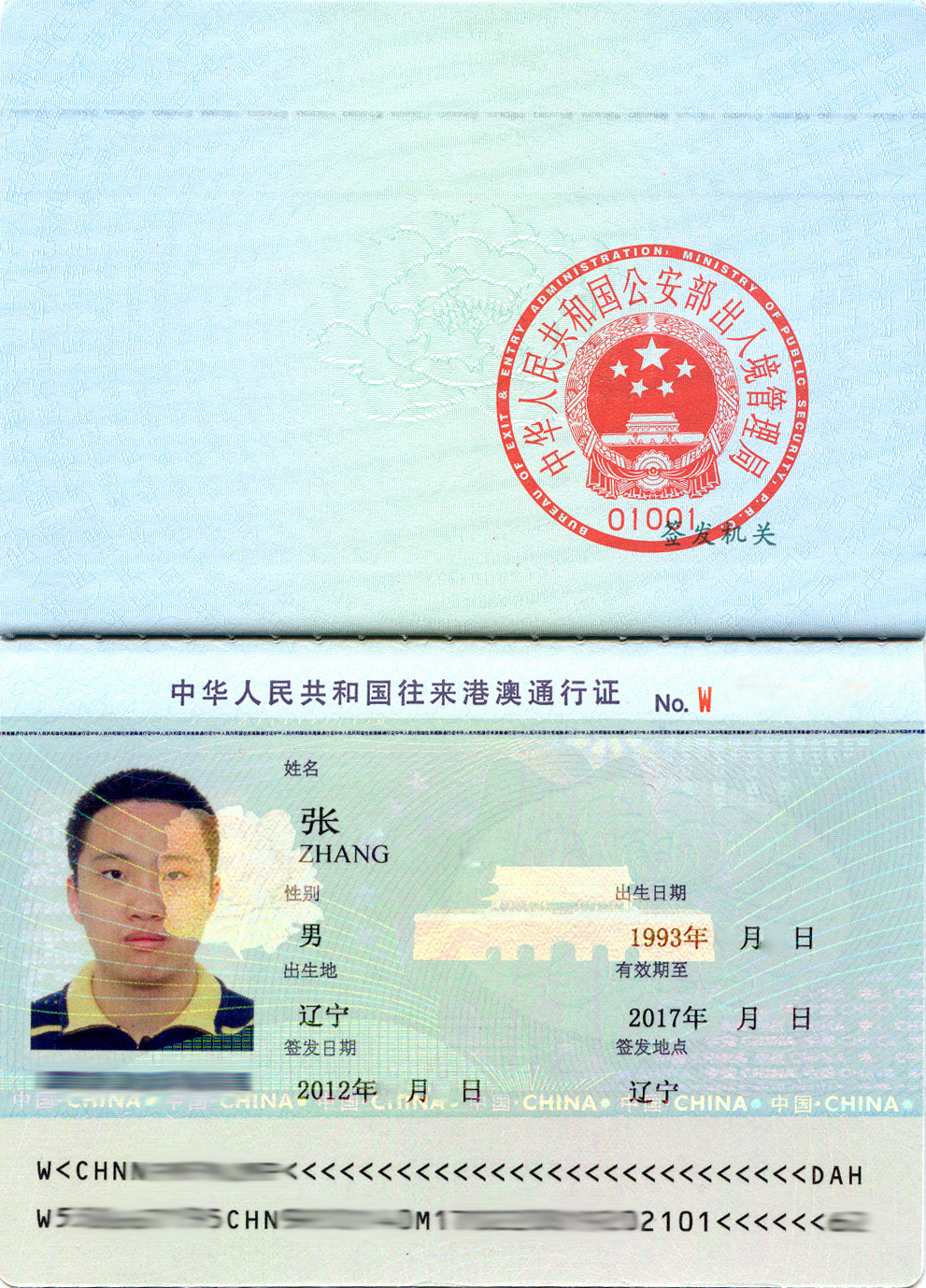
Biodata page of a booklet-type Two-way Permit

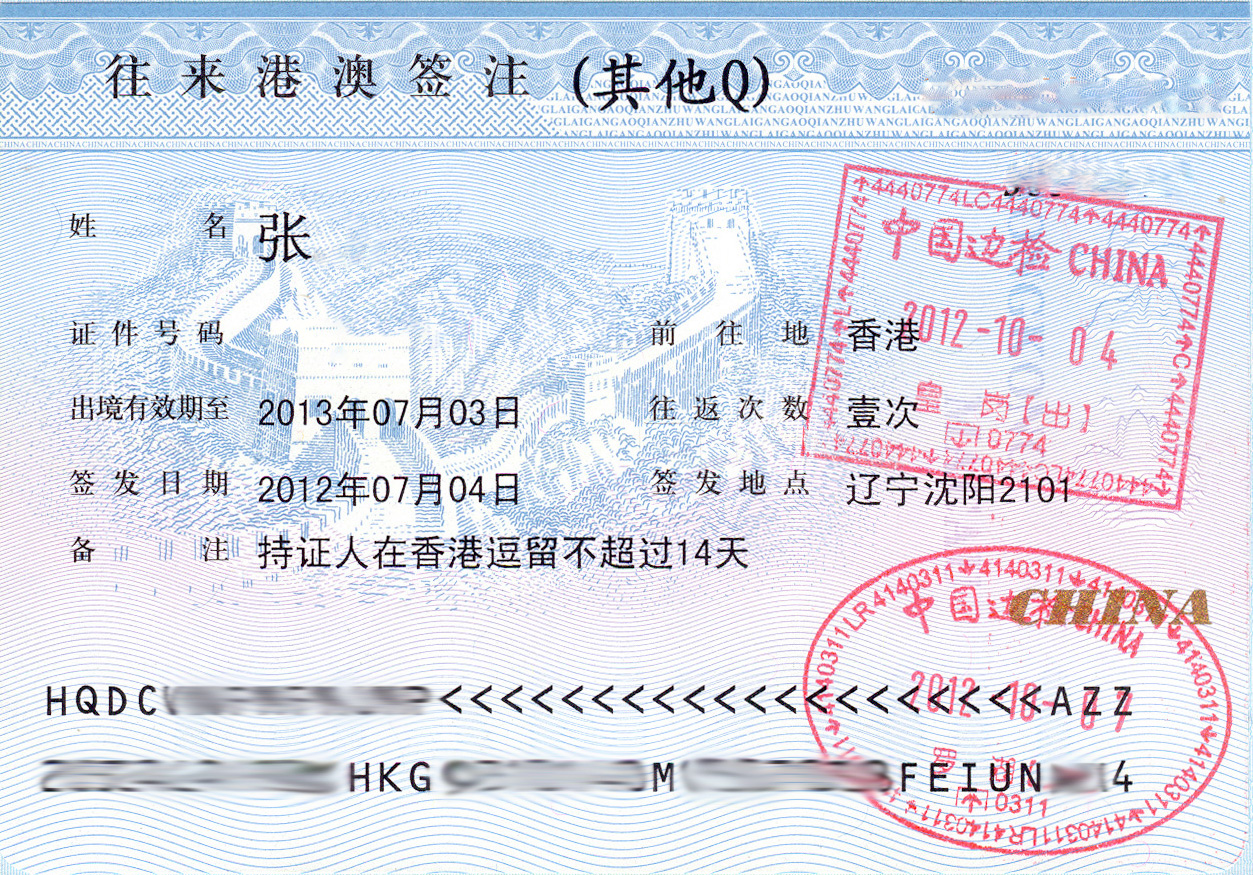
Type Q single exit endorsement on a Two-way Permit for a stay for up to 14 days

== See also ==
- One-way Permit
- Home Return Permit
- Taiwan Travel Permit
- Mainland Travel Permit for Taiwan Residents
- Individual Visit Scheme
