= One-way Permit =

Travel document

Permit for Proceeding to Hong Kong and Macao 前往港澳通行证
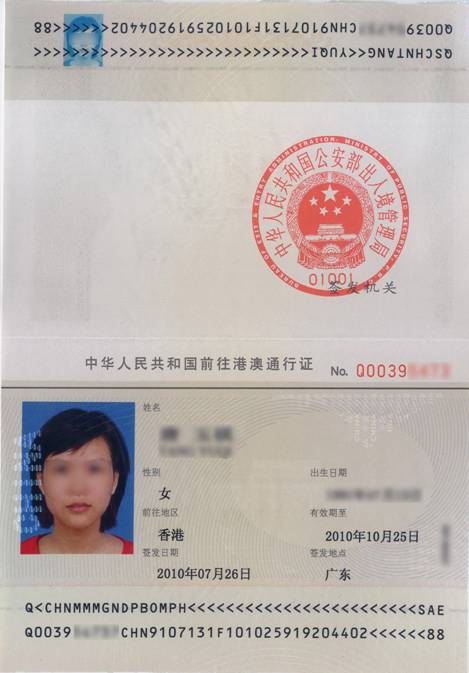
- Biodata page
- Type: Travel document
- Issued by: China
- First issued: 1982

One-way Permit
- Traditional Chinese: 前往港澳通行證
- Simplified Chinese: 前往港澳通行证
Transcriptions
Standard Mandarin
- Hanyu Pinyin: Qiánwǎng Gǎng Ào tōngxíngzhèng
Yue: Cantonese
- Yale Romanization: chìhn wóhng Góng Ou tūng hàhng jing
- Jyutping: cin4 wong5 gong2 ou3 tung1 hang4 zing3

One-way Permit
- Traditional Chinese: 單程證
- Simplified Chinese: 单程证
Transcriptions
Standard Mandarin
- Hanyu Pinyin: Dānchéngzhèng
Yue: Cantonese
- Yale Romanization: Dāan chìhng jing
- Jyutping: Daan1 cing4 zing3

The Permit for Proceeding to Hong Kong and Macao, colloquially known as the One-way Permit, is a travel document issued by the Exit and Entry Administration of the People's Republic of China. This passport-size document is issued for its bearers, Chinese citizens residing in the mainland with relatives in Hong Kong or Macau, to proceed to the special administrative regions for residency.

== History ==
The British Hong Kong government implemented the Touch Base Policy, which confer all mainland residents who arrived in Hong Kong the legal Hong Kong resident status. As the number of immigrants increased, the British Hong Kong government decided to change the policy and control immigration.

In 1982, in order to control the border, the British Hong Kong government reached an agreement with the Chinese government, stipulating that mainland residents coming to Hong Kong for residency must hold a one-way permit issued by the Chinese government, with a quota of 75 per day. In 1995, the one-way permit daily quota was raised to 150. As of 2024, this quota cap remains in effect.

== Selected statistics ==
Year	No. of bearers	Bearers aged 15+	Remaining quota by year	Median age
2002	45234	30945	9516	29
2003	53507	38640	1243	30
2004	38072	26752	16678	29
2005	55106	40568	-356	29
2006	54170	37779	580	27
2007	33865	24798	20885	28
2008	41610	31435	13140	28
2009	48587	38854	6163	29
2010	42624	34071	1216	29
2011	43379	35916	11371	31
2012	54646	47721	254	36
2013	45031	37797	9719	33
2014	40496	32627	14254	32
2015	38338	31423	16412	32
2016	57387	47358	-2487	32
2017	46971	38740	7779	32
2018	42331	35002	12569	33
2019	39060	31358	15690	32
2020	10134	7974	44766	32
2021	17919	14026	36831	31

As of the end of 2016, approximately 950,000 mainland migrants came from the program, representing about 12.8% of Hong Kong's total population.

== Controversy ==
Although the permit is specifically for the purpose of family reunion, not for general immigration, the scheme is controversial. Hong Kong currently has a quota of 150 people per day and the waiting time for spouses is currently 4 years. Journalist Ching Cheong alleges that the scheme, whose beneficiaries are at the sole discretion of the PRC government and outside of the vetting procedures of the Hong Kong Immigration Department, is an infiltration mechanism for creating a loyal voter bloc in Hong Kong; those that are not filled by cadres become a graft mechanism for officials. Martin Lee said that the policy is part of the CPC's strategy of long-run "Tibetisation" of Hong Kong, aimed at marginalising Hong Kong people and their core values over time.

== See also ==
- Exit-Entry Permit for Travelling to and from Hong Kong and Macau: The permit issued to Mainland Chinese residents visiting Hong Kong and Macau temporarily.
- Home Return Permit
- Taiwan Compatriot Entry Permit
