= Refugee wave from the People's Republic of China to British Hong Kong =

20th-century migration event

In the 20th century, British Hong Kong became a very popular destination for refugees fleeing from China.

== History ==
=== Before Communist China ===
China suffered a chronic refugee crisis in the first half of the 20th century, which worsened in the 1940s due to the Second World War and the Chinese Civil War. Hong Kong was an attractive destination for those leaving China; the China-Hong Kong border imposed few restrictions on freedom of movement. The colony implemented formal immigration controls in 1940 after Japan captured Guangzhou during the Second Sino-Japanese War; the controls had limited success.

=== The Chinese Civil War and subsequent years ===
The British authorities dramatically tightened immigration controls at the end of the Chinese Civil War. Hong Kong imposed new immigration regulations in April 1949, partly as a security measure against the Communists, and established the Frontier Closed Area border zone in 1951. On the Chinese side, the Peoples’ Republic of China, motivated by its distrust of the Western Bloc and its desire to prevent the well-off from emigrating, restricted cross-border movement in February 1952 by requiring entry and exit permits.

Refugees continued to arrive after the Second World War. Another wave occurred as the newly founded Peoples’ Republic of China consolidated its control in southern China. During this period, a large number of Kuomintang members along with their families and refugees crossed the border into Hong Kong, forming the base of the Pro-ROC camp, which was very influential during the Cold War. By 1957, a third of Hong Kong's population of 2.5 million were refugees. Nonetheless, Peoples’ Republic of China measures did make natural growth the main source of population growth in Hong Kong.

=== Later waves ===
The flood-famine in northern Guangdong in Spring 1957 led to a wave of refugees in July 1957. Thousands of hungry civilians gathered at the border since February claiming to "seek relatives". Hongkongers, upon seeing the scenes in newspapers, felt pity and brought food across the border and the political impact worried the Guangdong officials. On 29 June 1957, the Guangdong committee of Chinese Communist Party authorized the Bao'an County to let the hungry get across the border.

The Great Chinese Famine caused another wave in 1962. The New York Times reported that 140,000 Chinese entered Hong Kong in 1962, with 80,000 illegally entering in a single month. The large number, increased by temporarily relaxed Peoples’ Republic of China border controls, causing a diplomatic crisis.

== Policy toward refugees ==
=== Hong Kong ===
Edvard Hambro wrote, "Some may not be refugees in the legal sense but are in the broader sociological and humanitarian sense."

A report in 1958 by the Hong Kong government wrote, "the refugees [in 1957], however, have shown no desire to return to the mainland, even though Hong Kong is unable to offer to all the prospect of earning a reasonable living."

== Commemoration ==
On June 15, 2022, a monument to Chinese sent-down youth refugees who died on the roads to Hong Kong was unveiled in the Eternal Sunset Memorial Park & Cemetery of Lafayette, New Jersey. It inspected 176 victims died during the Culture Revolution, including those from all middle schools of Guangzhou.

== Sources ==
- Chi-Kwan Mark (November 2007). "The 'Problem of People': British Colonials, Cold War Powers, and the Chinese Refugees in Hong Kong, 1949–62". Modern Asian Studies. 41 (6). Cambridge University Press: 1145–1181. doi:10.1017/S0026749X06002666. JSTOR 4499816.
- Hambro, Edvard (1957). "Chinese Refugees in Hong Kong". The Phylon Quarterly. 18 (1): 69–81. doi:10.2307/273076. JSTOR 273076.
- Smart, Alan; Smart, Josephine (2008). "Time-Space Punctuation: Hong Kong's Border Regime and Limits on Mobility". Pacific Affairs. 81 (2): 175–193. doi:10.5509/2008812175.
