= Mainland Travel Permit for Taiwan Resident =

Travel document issued by China for visitors from Taiwan

Mainland Travel Permit for Taiwan Resident 台湾居民来往大陆通行证
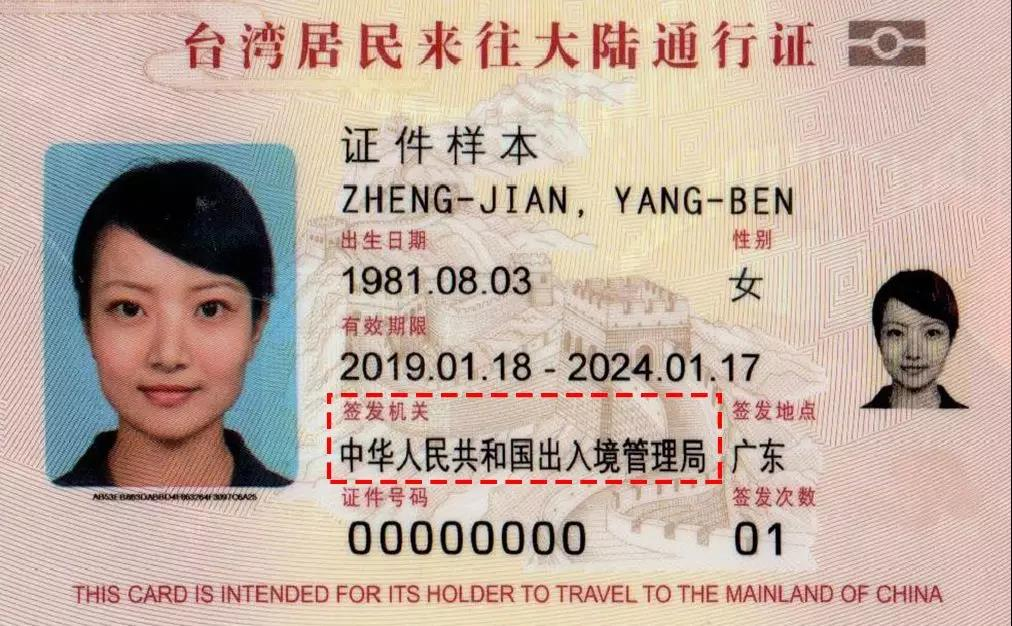

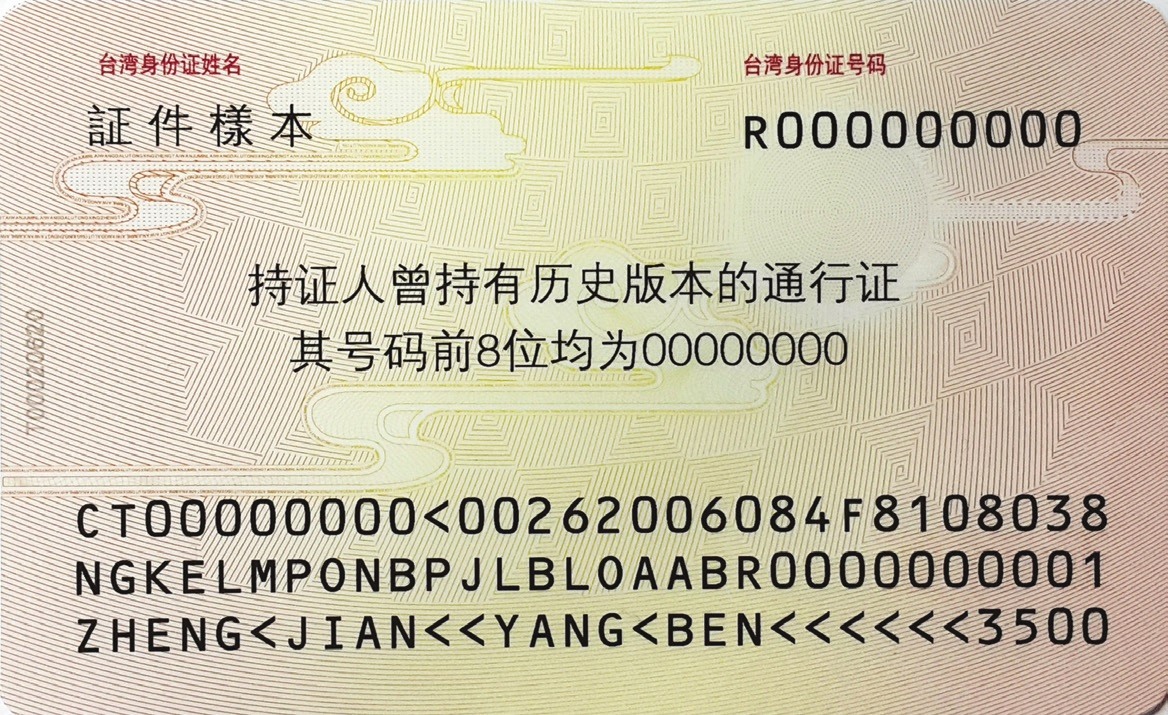
- Front and back of the travel permit
- Type: Travel document and Identity document
- Issued by: China
- Purpose: For travelling to mainland China
- Eligibility: Republic of China nationals holding household registration in Taiwan
- Expiration: 5 years

Mainland Travel Permit for Taiwan Resident
- Traditional Chinese: 臺灣居民來往大陸通行證
- Simplified Chinese: 台湾居民来往大陆通行证
Transcriptions
Standard Mandarin
- Hanyu Pinyin: Táiwān jūmín láiwǎng Dàlù tōngxíngzhèng
- Bopomofo: ㄊㄞˊ ㄨㄢ ㄐㄩ ㄇㄧㄣˊ ㄌㄞˊ ㄨㄤˇ ㄉㄚˋ ㄌㄨˋ ㄊㄨㄥ ㄒㄧㄥˊ ㄓㄥˋ
- Gwoyeu Romatzyh: Tair'uan jiumin lairwaang Dahluh tongshyngjenq
- Wade–Giles: T′ai²-wan¹ chü¹-min² lai²-wang³ ta⁴-lu⁴ tung¹-hsing²-chêng⁴
- Tongyong Pinyin: Táiwan jyumín láiwǎng Dàlù tongsíngjhèng
- MPS2: Táiwān jiūmín láiwǎng dàlù tōngshíngjèng
Hakka
- Pha̍k-fa-sṳ: Thòi-vàn kî-mìn lòi-vông thai-liu̍k thûng-hàng-chṳn
Southern Min
- Hokkien POJ: Tâi-oân ki-bîn lâi-óng tāi-lio̍k thong-hêng-chèng
- Tâi-lô: Tâi-uân ki-bîn lâi-óng tāi-lio̍k thong-hîng-tsìng

Taiwan Compatriot Permit
- Traditional Chinese: 臺胞證
- Simplified Chinese: 台胞证
Transcriptions
Standard Mandarin
- Hanyu Pinyin: Táibāozhèng
- Bopomofo: ㄊㄞˊ ㄅㄠ ㄓㄥˋ
- Gwoyeu Romatzyh: Tairbaujenq
- Wade–Giles: T′ai²-pao¹-chêng⁴
- Tongyong Pinyin: Táibaojhèng
- MPS2: Táibāujèng
Southern Min
- Hokkien POJ: Tâi-pau-chèng
- Tâi-lô: Tâi-pau-tsìng

The Mainland Travel Permit for Taiwan Resident (also known as the Taiwan Compatriot Permit or Taiwan Compatriot Pass) is a travel document issued by the Exit and Entry Administration of the People's Republic of China. This card-size biometric document is issued to Taiwan residents for traveling to mainland China. Since 2017, Taiwan residents with this document can stay in mainland China indefinitely for any purpose, including working and studying, with no restriction imposed.

== Background and usage ==
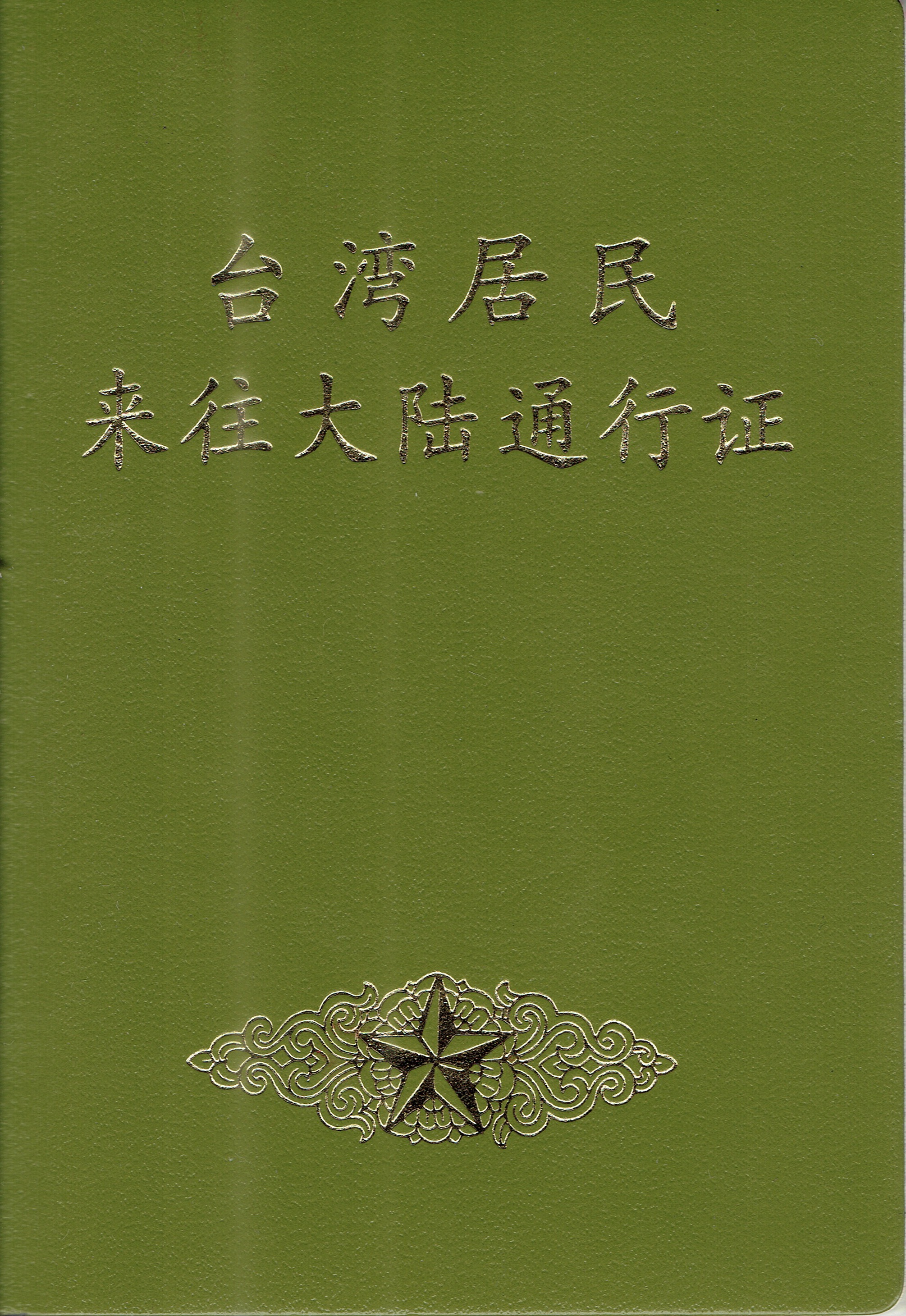
Travel permit cover issued before 1 July 2015

Due to the special political status of Taiwan, neither the PRC nor the ROC recognizes the passports issued by the other and neither considers travel between mainland China and Taiwan as formal international travel. This permit is therefore issued as the travel document for Taiwan residents to enter mainland China since 1987, when the then President of the Republic of China Chiang Ching-kuo decided to lift the mutual travel ban across the Taiwan Strait.

This entry permit serves also as the de facto ID card for ROC nationals who are residents of Taiwan in mainland China. As a result, the permit can be accepted in cases of real estate purchasing, banking, medical treatment, insurance, employment, and more.

Due to its usage as an ID card and the increasing instances of Taiwanese's long-time stay and settlement in mainland China, the Taiwan Affairs Office announced that effective from 24 September 2008, the serial number of the Mainland Travel Permit for Taiwan Resident will remain unchanged for the person's lifetime. The permit served as a de facto identification card for Taiwan residents in mainland China until the Residence Permit for Taiwan Residents was issued in September 2018.

== Application ==
=== Long-term travel permit ===
Taiwanese can apply for the permit in China Travel Service's Hong Kong or Macau branches or through travel agencies in Taiwan. Renewals can be done in CTS branches in Hong Kong and Macau, travel agencies in Taiwan, as well as Exit and Entry Administration bureaus in mainland China.

=== Single-entry travel permit ===
The single-entry travel permit (not to be confused with "entry endorsements", now abolished) is intended for Taiwanese residents who have never held the travel permit, or whose travel permit has recently expired, and who need to travel to mainland China. To be eligible, the applicant must hold their Taiwanese passport with remaining validity for more than six months, in conjunction with the person's Taiwanese ID card as well as two 2-inch photos. Some ports may require additional documents, such as a return ticket or an invitation letter. As of 20 November 2025, there are 100 ports have eligibility to issue single-entry Mainland Travel Permit. The single-entry travel permit is valid for a stay up to 3 months. Holder of a valid, long-term travel permit is not eligible to use this service, they must instead carry the long-term permit or will be refused entry for not doing so.

== Appearance (post-2015) ==
All new long-term permits issued after 2015 have taken the design of the (current) ID card, although short-term (single-entry) travel permits appear more like the previous passport-book style travel permit.

The ID-card style permit is designed and produced in accordance to ICAO standards, and contains a contactless integrated circuit chip equipped with many anti-counterfeiting and digital security technologies. The front side of the card includes personal information like the bearer's photo, names in Chinese and English, date of birth, and sex, and document information like the period of validity, issuing authority and location, permit number, and the number of issuances. The reverse side of the card includes the bearer's name and ID number as listed on the ROC national identity card, the machine-readable zone, and any comments in regards to any of the bearer's previous travel permits.

The front of the card also includes the English text “THIS CARD IS INTENDED FOR ITS HOLDER TO TRAVEL TO THE MAINLAND OF CHINA” to avoid logistical difficulties when travelling from non-Chinese-speaking countries or territories.

The first ID card travel permits were issued in Fujian on 6 July 2015 during a pilot period, during which applications for the previous passport-style travel permits were no longer accepted.

=== Front (personal information) ===
Like the new versions of the Mainland Travel Permit for Hong Kong and Macau Residents and the Entry-Exit Permit for Travelling to and from Hong Kong and Macau, the new Mainland Travel Permit includes a photo of the bearer's fact on the left with a second, smaller photo on the right. The front also includes the following information:

- Name: the bearer's Chinese name in Chinese and romanization thereof, displayed in two rows (the Chinese name written in Simplified Chinese characters, and the English name as written in the bearer's passport)
- Date of birth: in the format YYYY.MM.DD
- Sex: either 男 (male) or 女 (female)
- Validity period: in the format YYYY.MM.DD (issuing date) – YYYY.MM.DD – (expiry date). The period of validity is 5 years
- Issuing authority: Entry and Exit Administration of the People's Republic of China (before 1 April 2019, this was the Entry-Exit Management Bureau of the Ministry of Public Security)
- Issuing location: only the issuing province (or provincial-level administrative division)
- Permit number: 8-digit number
- Number of issuances: 2-digit number, starting with 01
- Explanatory note: “THIS CARD IS INTENDED FOR ITS HOLDER TO TRAVEL TO THE MAINLAND OF CHINA”

=== Back (other information) ===
- Name as on national identity card: bearer's name, in Traditional Chinese characters, as it appears on the ROC national identity card
- Taiwan ID number: 1 letter followed by 9 numbers
- Previous permit(s) information: notes any previous permits/permit numbers held by the bearer
- Machine-readable zone

== Entry endorsements (abolished) ==
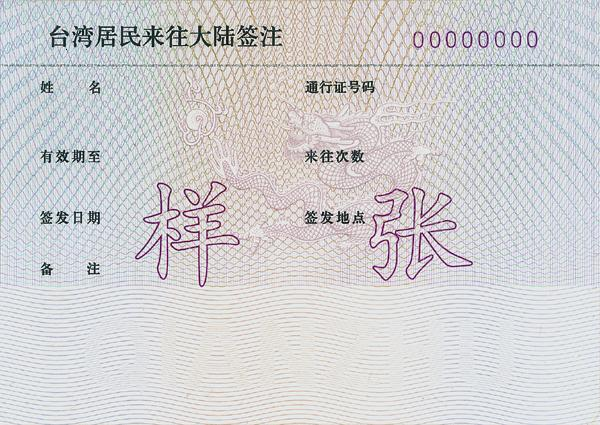
Entry endorsement of the Taiwan Compatriot Permit

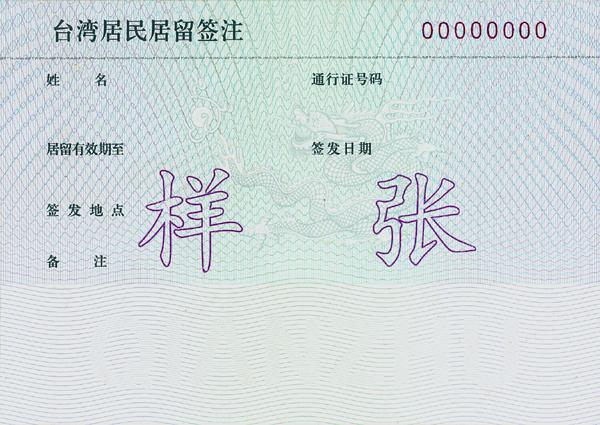
Residence endorsement of the Taiwan Compatriot Permit

Prior to 1 July 2015, for each entry into mainland China, permit holders needed to apply for an entry endorsement, which could be in the form of an immigration stamp or a visa-like vignette, that shows the document bearer's allowed duration of stay inside mainland China. Additional single-entry endorsements could be applied at Hong Kong International Airport and Macau International Airport outside mainland China. Entry endorsements were classified as:

- Single entry for 3 months (HKD 150)
- Multiple entry within 1, 2 or 3 years

Certain employment, education or investment certification was required when applying for a 2- or 3-year multi-entry endorsements. In practice most Taiwanese travel agencies would prepare the necessary forms and have the documents with valid permits sent back to Taiwan by air. Around 1% of the applications are rejected, mainly to sensitive identities such as pro-Taiwan independence/Tibet independence figures, Falun Gong members and the like. Permit bearer could also apply for 3-month single-entry endorsement on arrival for CNY 100 in the 100 designated ports of entry, as long as the permit remains valid.

=== Abolition ===
Effective from 1 July 2015, holders of the permit are no longer required to apply for entry endorsements when arriving in mainland China. The length of stay for Taiwanese residents are no longer restricted, however holder of the permit must leave mainland China before the expiration date of the permit, or they must apply for renewal at the local MPS office.

== Entering Hong Kong and Macau with the Permit ==
Hong Kong authorities accept either ROC passports or Mainland Travel Permits. For ROC passport holders, a Pre-arrival Registration along with a printout copy is required while the ROC passport is inspected. Entry and exit stamps were abolished in Hong Kong in 2013 and visitors are now only issued "landing slips", a separated piece of paper which does not attach to passports. For holders of the Permit, valid Hong Kong Entry Permit used to be required, but in early 2009, Hong Kong authorities announced that effective from 27 April 2009, Hong Kong would grant 7-day visa-free access to Permit holders. Started from 1 September 2011, the visa-free period was further increased to 30 days.

Macau allows the holders of the permit and ROC passports for entry, all permit holders and ROC passport holders are granted a visa-free stay of 30 days.

== Changes in 2015 ==
During the 7th Straits Forum in Xiamen, Fujian in June 2015, Chairman of the National Committee of the Chinese People's Political Consultative Conference, Yu Zhengsheng, announced the abolition of entry endorsements and the restrictions on the period of stay for Taiwanese to visit or reside in mainland China. The booklet-format travel permit was transformed into an ICAO-compliant biometric card, resembling the Mainland Travel Permit for Hong Kong and Macao Residents. The change can be seen as facilitating travel between Taiwan and mainland China. The new policy took effect on 1 July 2015.

In November 2015, the municipality of Shanghai has announced that it will be the first region in China to grant resident-like social benefits to holders of the permit, including public housing, public education, medical care and more. The services are only offered to PRC nationals with hukou in Shanghai, and are not available to PRC nationals with hukou in other regions.

== See also ==
- Mainland Travel Permit for Hong Kong and Macao Residents
- Residence Permit for Hong Kong, Macao, and Taiwan Residents
- Entry & Exit Permit for Taiwan
- Hong Kong Re-entry Permit
