= Residence Permit for Hong Kong, Macao, and Taiwan Residents =

Identity document in the People's Republic of China

Residence Permit for Hong Kong and Macao Residents 港澳居民居住证 Residence Permit for Taiwan Residents 台湾居民居住证
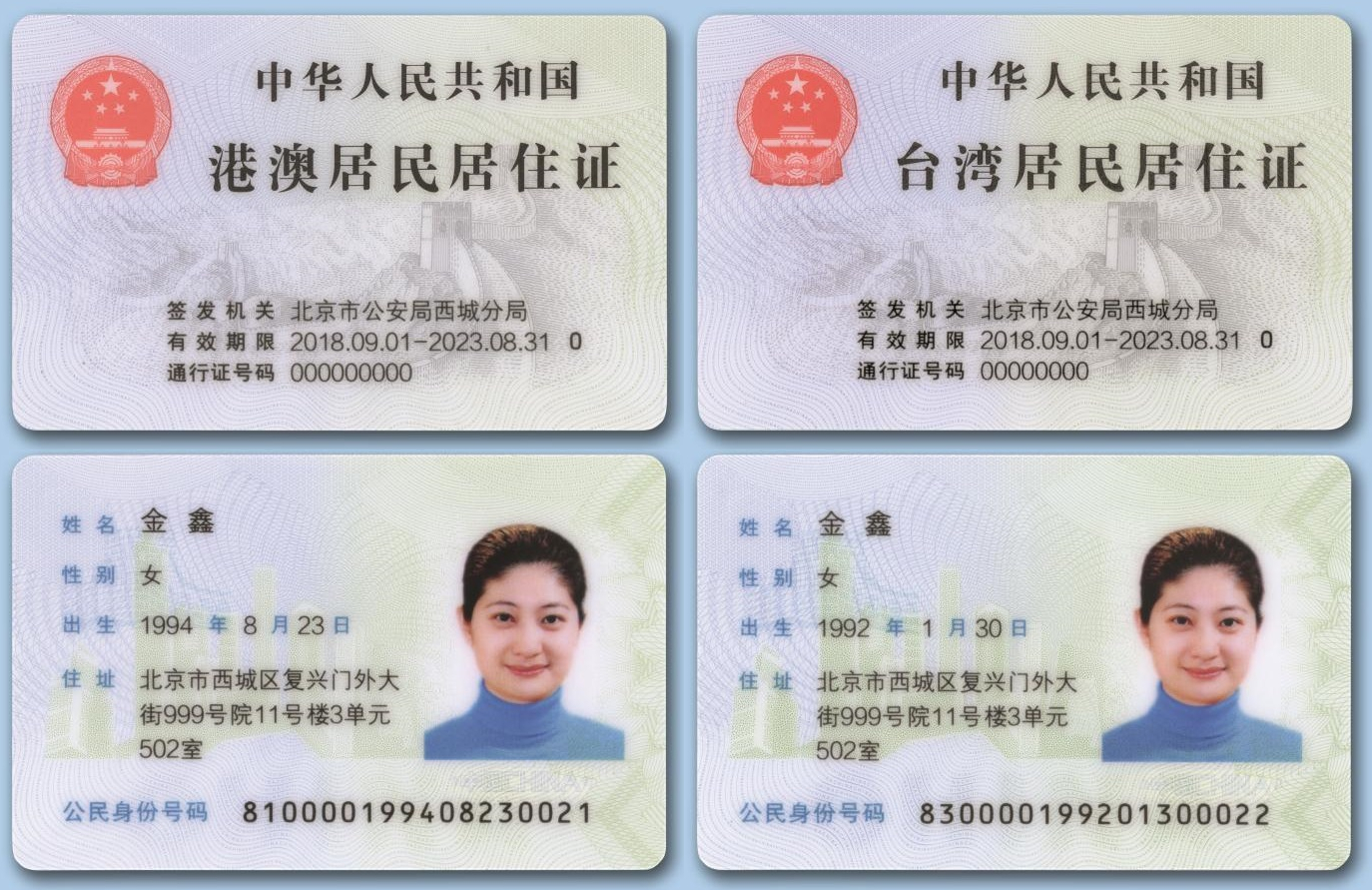
- Front and reverse of permits for Hong Kong and Macao (left) and Taiwan residents (right)
- Type: Identity document
- Issued by: China
- Purpose: Identification
- Eligibility: Chinese nationality, permanent residency status in Hong Kong, Macau, or Taiwan, have lived in the mainland for more than six months, and; meet one of the following conditions: legal and stable employment, legal and stable residence, or continuous study

Residence Permit for Hong Kong and Macao Residents
- Simplified Chinese: 港澳居民居住证
- Traditional Chinese: 港澳居民居住證
Transcriptions
Standard Mandarin
- Hanyu Pinyin: Gǎng-Aò Jūmín Jūzhùzhèng
- Wade–Giles: Kang-ao Chü-min Chü-chu-cheng

Residence Permit for Taiwan Residents
- Simplified Chinese: 台湾居民居住证
- Traditional Chinese: 臺灣居民居住證
Transcriptions
Standard Mandarin
- Hanyu Pinyin: Táiwān Jūmín Jūzhùzhèng
- Wade–Giles: Tʻai-wan Chü-min Chü-chu-cheng

The Residence Permit for Hong Kong, Macao, and Taiwan Residents is an identity document in the People's Republic of China. It is issued to Chinese citizens with permanent residency in Hong Kong, Macau, and Taiwan. Legally, Chinese citizens with permanent residency in the three regions can reside indefinitely in mainland China for any purpose without restriction. They can apply for this card for their living convenience in mainland China, as long as they have lived in the mainland for more than six months and meet one of the following conditions: legal and stable employment, legal and stable residence, or continuous study.

Applications for this card first opened on 1 September 2018.

== Background ==
Until the introduction of the residence permit, residents of these places could only use their mainland travel permits as identity document in mainland China. Since the mainland travel permits have a different format from the resident identity card for mainland Chinese residents, this caused trouble in situations where only the resident identity card can be used. The residence permit is designed to be similar to the resident identity card to let its holders enjoy the same basic public services and convenience as mainland Chinese residents.

== Contents ==
Residence permit has a citizen identification number in the same format as resident identity card. This is the first time that the Chinese government ever assigns a number to residents of these places. The address codes of Hong Kong, Macau and Taiwan for the identification number are 810000, 820000 and 830000 respectively. The contents on the permit are mostly the same as those on the resident identity card; the differences are that there are number of issuances and mainland travel permit number on the obverse side, and there is no ethnicity on the reverse side.
