= Chinese passport =

Travel document issued to PRC citizens

People's Republic of China passport 中华人民共和国护照
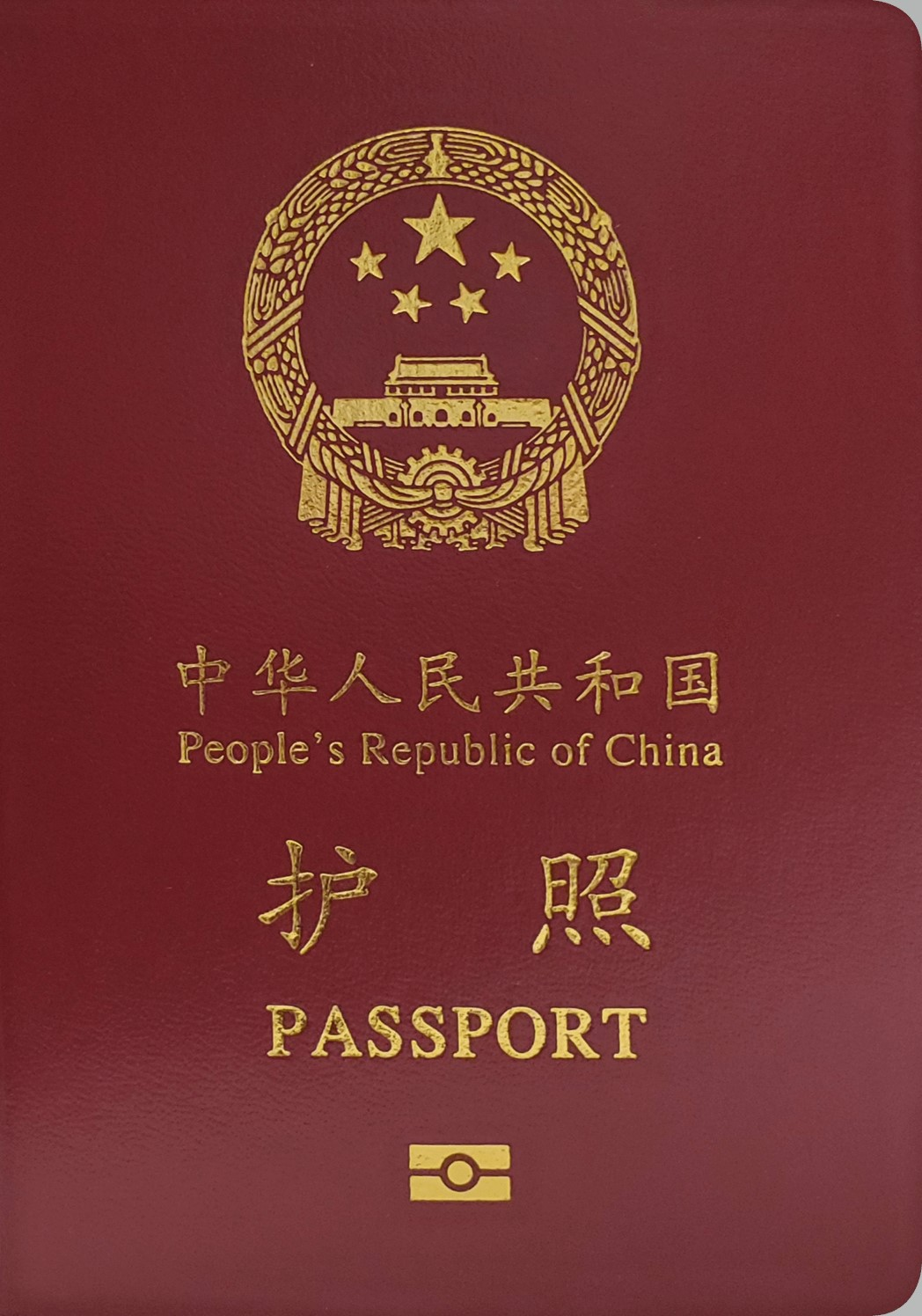
- Front cover of the current Chinese passport (with chip), issued since May 2012

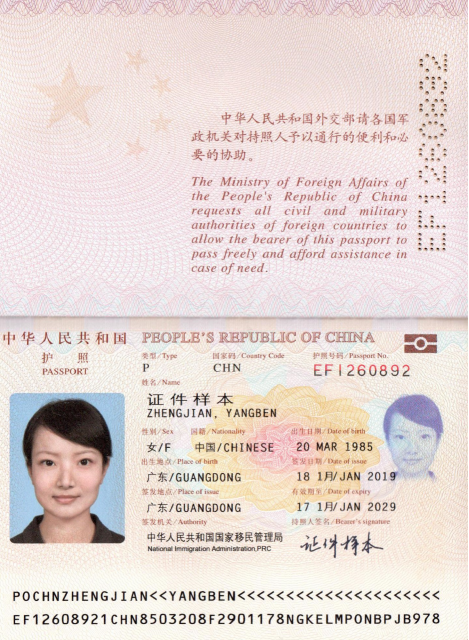
- Personal data page of the current Chinese biometric passport
- Type: Passport
- Issued by: National Immigration Administration of the Ministry of Public Security
- First issued: 1949
- Purpose: Identification
- Eligibility: Chinese nationals with Hukou residing in Mainland China, or Chinese nationals residing abroad who do not qualify for travel documents issued by Hong Kong SAR or Macau SAR.
- Expiration: 10 years after acquisition for adults aged 16 or over, 5 for children or non-ordinary passport 3 months for single group travel
- Cost: ¥120 for both first passport and renewed passport

The People's Republic of China passport (Note: Chinese: 中华人民共和国护照; pinyin: Zhōnghuá Rénmín Gònghéguó hùzhào) (commonly referred to as the Chinese passport) (Note: Chinese: 中国护照; pinyin: Zhōngguó hùzhào) is a passport issued to citizens of the People's Republic of China for the purpose of international travel, and entitles its bearer to the protection of China's consular officials overseas.

On 1 July 2011, the Ministry of Foreign Affairs launched a trial issuance of e-passports for individuals conducting public affairs work overseas on behalf of the Chinese government. The face, fingerprints, and other biometric features of the passport holder are digitized and stored in pre-installed contactless smart chip, along with "the passport owner's name, sex and personal photo as well as the passport's term of validity and [the] digital certificate of the chip". Ordinary biometric passports were introduced by the Ministry of Public Security on 15 May 2012. As of January 2015, all new passports issued by China are biometric e-passports, and non-biometric passports are no longer issued.

In 2012, over 38 million Chinese citizens held ordinary passports, comprising only 2.86 percent of the total population at the time. In 2014, China issued 16 million passports, ranking first in the world, surpassing the United States (14 million) and India (10 million). The number of ordinary passports in circulation rose to 120 million by October 2016, which was approximately 8.7 percent of the population. As of April 2017 to date, China had issued over 100 million biometric ordinary passports.

== Overview and contents ==
=== Types ===
Articles 3, 4, 5 and 8 of the Passport Law of the People's Republic of China, which went into effect in 2007, declares three types of passports issued in China:

- Ordinary passports (普通护照) are issued to citizens who intend to go abroad for non-official purposes, such as taking up residence in other countries, visiting relatives, studying, working, travelling or engaging in business activities. They are issued by the National Immigration Administration of the Ministry of Public Security (MPS), the foreign missions of the People's Republic of China, or other missions overseas authorized to do so by the Ministry of Foreign Affairs.
- Diplomatic passports (外交护照) are issued to diplomats, consuls and their spouses or children who are minor, as well as to diplomatic couriers. They are issued by the Ministry of Foreign Affairs (MFA).
- Service passports (公务护照) are issued to employees who are dispatched by the Chinese government to work for Chinese foreign missions, the United Nations or its special commissions, or other international organizations, as well as their spouses or minor children. They are issued by the MFA, foreign missions of the People's Republic of China, other missions overseas authorized by the MFA, or the Foreign Affairs Offices under the governments of provinces, autonomous regions, municipalities directly under the Central Government and cities divided into districts authorized by the MFA.
  - A special variation of the service passport, called the Passport for Public Affairs (Chinese: 公务普通护照; lit. 'ordinary service passport'), is issued to public servants who "lead divisions or equivalents" of county or state-owned companies, and employees of state-controlled companies.

Article 9 of the Law states that the "issuing scope of diplomatic passports and service passports, the measures for issue of such passports, their terms of validity and the specific categories of service passports shall be prescribed by the Ministry of Foreign Affairs".

The ordinary passport is considered a passport "for private affairs" (因私护照), while service (including for public affairs passports) and diplomatic passports are passports "for public affairs" (因公护照).

The passports for Macau and Hong Kong SARs are issued and regulated by the governments of these regions, and are therefore not covered by this law.

In July 2011 the Chinese government began to issue biometric diplomatic passports, service passports and passports for public affairs. The launch date of biometric ordinary passports was May 15, 2012.

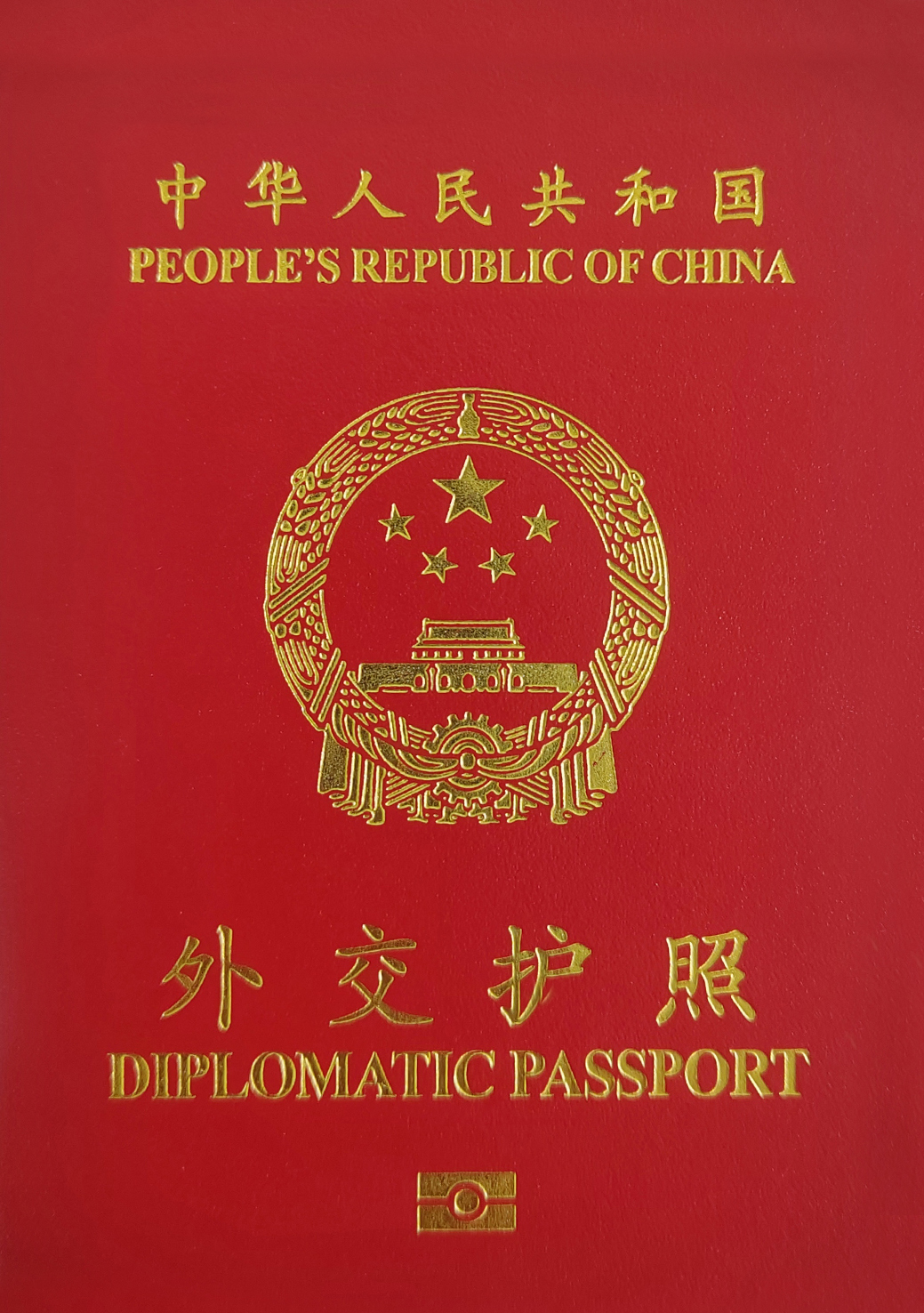
Diplomatic e-passport

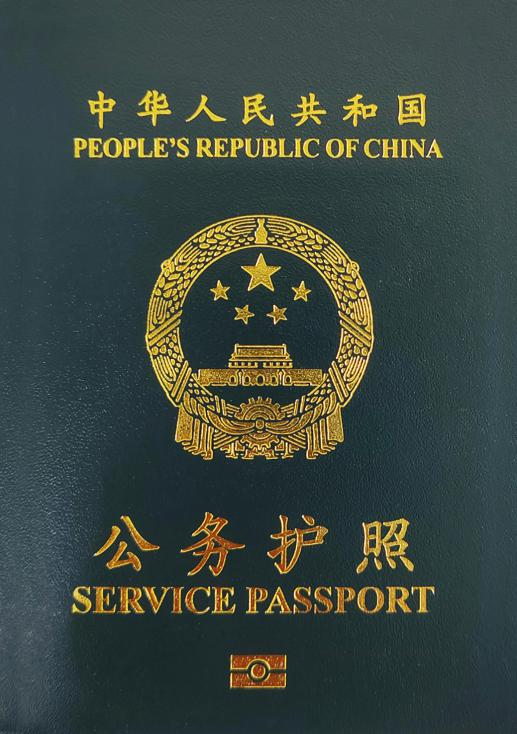
Service e-passport

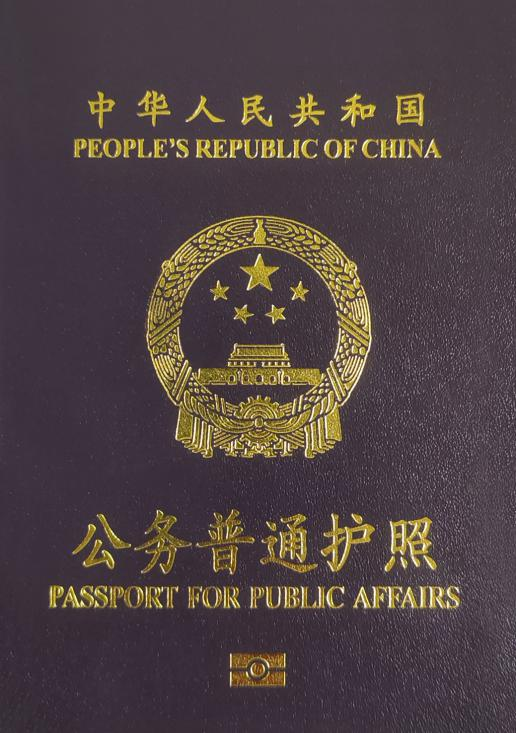
Public Affairs e-passport

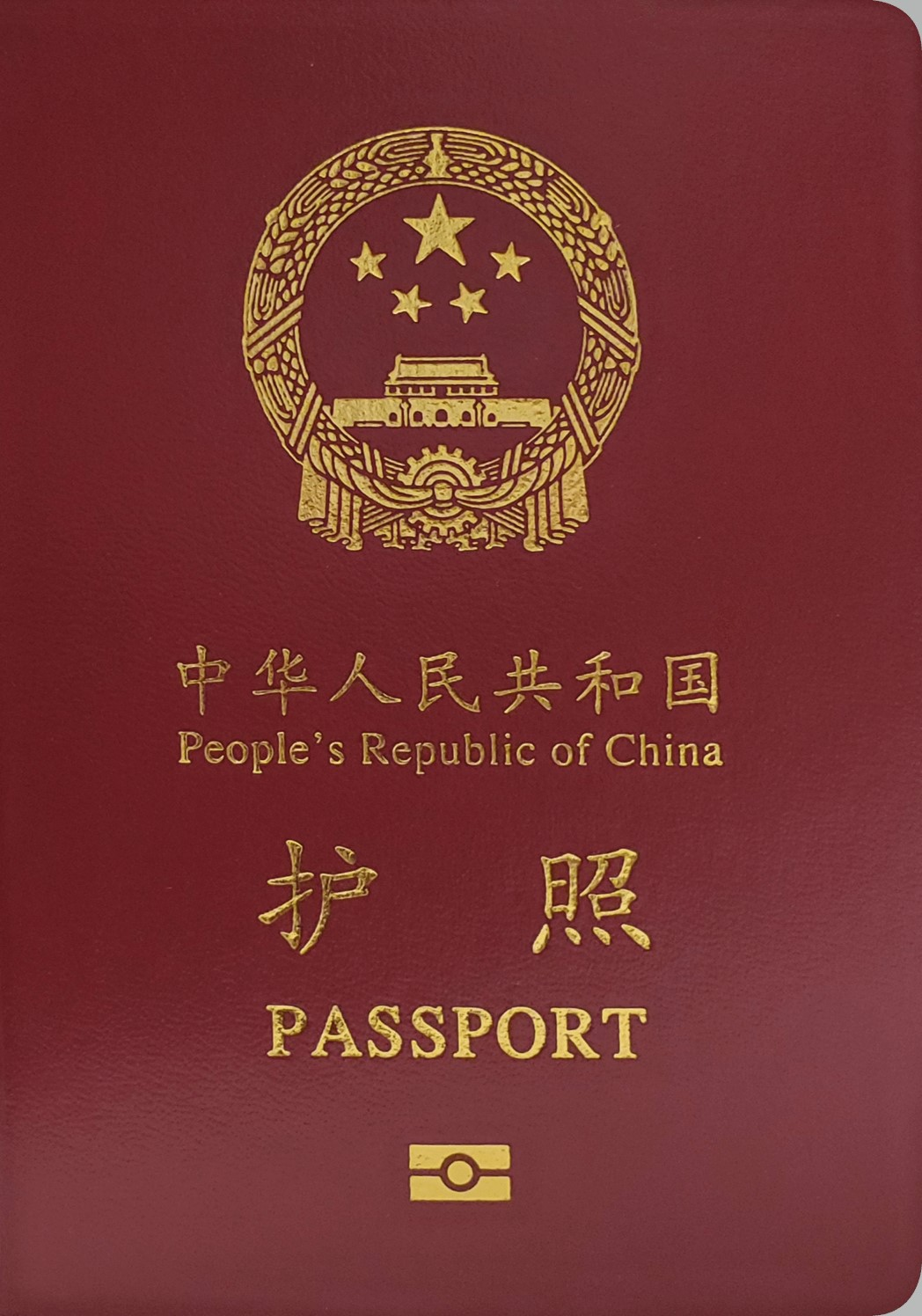
Ordinary e-passport

==== Passport for public affairs ====
A different passport for public affairs (Chinese: 因公普通护照; lit. 'ordinary passport for public affairs') was issued until 2006. Unlike the current version, it was classified as a variation of ordinary passport. The abuse of the use of document resulted in its subsequent cancellation. Unlike other passports, it was issued by the provincial or municipal Foreign Affairs Offices, rather than the Ministry of Foreign Affairs or the Ministry of Public Security. Chinese ordinary passport for public affairs was used at the end of the 1980s and the 1990s. The passport information was written by hand, and these ordinary passports were usually valid for 2 or 5 years.

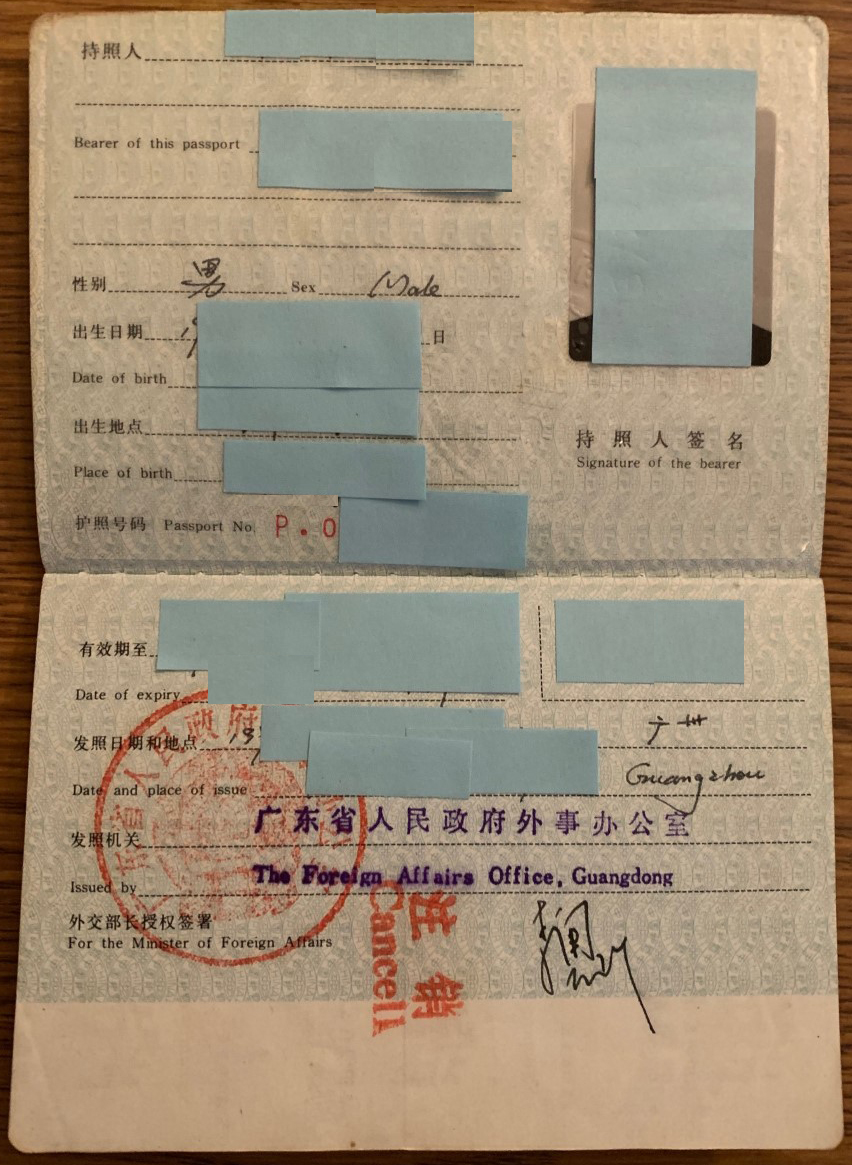
The front personal-information data page of a Chinese passport for public affairs issued in 1990

In 1996, 77% of persons exiting China held a passport for public affairs. The rate had dropped to 39% by 2002. The reason for the high rate of usage was because the passport for public affairs offered more visa-free countries, such as Russia, than the ordinary passport. Chinese regulations require public affairs passports to be kept in the possession of the holder's work unit, and they must be surrendered by the individual within one month of returning to China.

=== Validity ===
The passport previously had an across-the-board 5-year period of validity. Since 2007, ordinary passports are valid for 10 years for bearers above 16 years of age, and for 5 years for bearers below 16 years of age, and diplomatic or service passports are valid for 4 years. According to the 2006 Passport Law of the People's Republic of China, renewal of previously issued passports ended on January 1, 2007. However, passports renewed before 2007 remained valid until expiry.

=== Format ===
The newest version of the regular Chinese passport is the biometric version, which replaced its predecessors "Form 92", "Form 97-1" and "Form 97-2", but Form "97-2" passport is still being issued for single group tourism to Russia in some Sino-Russia border cities and valid for only 3 months or after returning to China. It was released to the general public in May 2012. The passport contains 48 pages.

==== Ordinary Passport - Inside ====
===== Version "1982" =====
The Form "1982" ordinary Chinese passport is a hand-written passport and issued in 1982. Chinese, French and English are used in all pages.

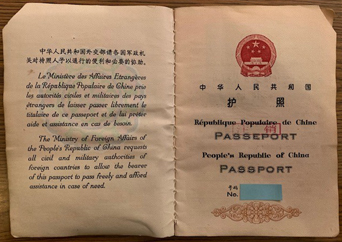

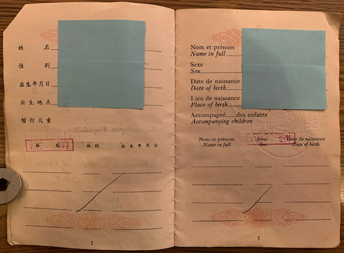

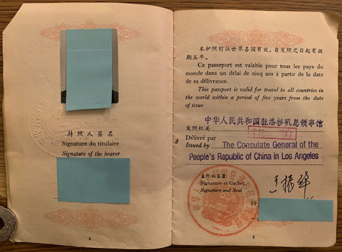

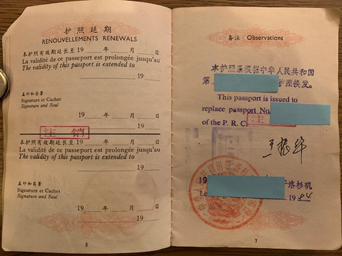

===== Version "1992" =====
The Form "1992" ordinary Chinese passport is not a machine-readable passport, and issued in 1992.

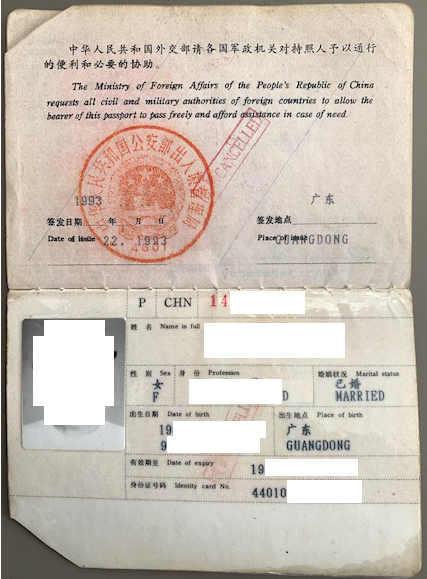

===== Version "1997-2" =====
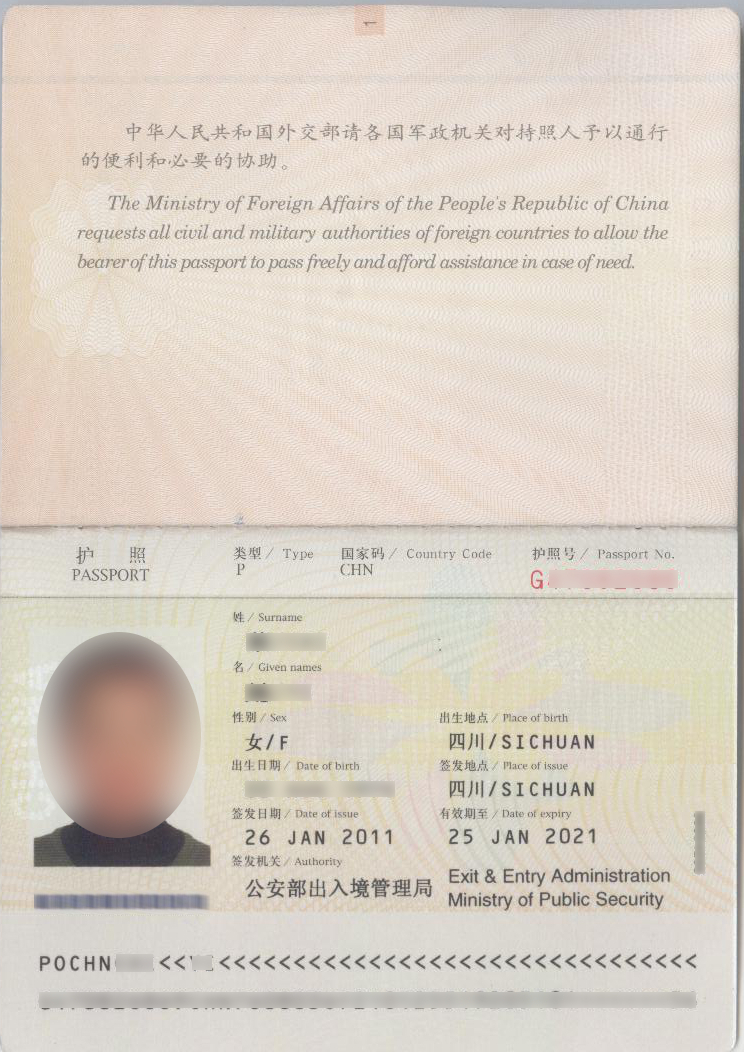
Biodata page of the Form "97-2" PRC Ordinary Passport

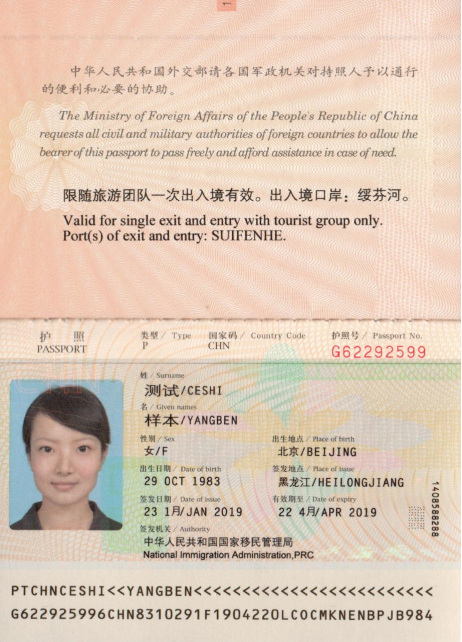
The note page and biodata page of the version "97-2" passport for single travel since 2019

The Form "97-2" ordinary Chinese passport is a machine-readable passport, and issued in February 1997. In "97-2", personal data is on the inside front cover along with a coloured photo printed with inkjet printer, with a protective film covering most of the data page. Details include:

- Passport code (P)
- Country Code (CHN)
- Passport number (G########) - consists of one letter indicating passport type (G = ordinary), followed by eight digits
- Surname
- Given Names
- Sex (M/F)
- Date of birth (DD.MMM.YYYY)
- Date of issue (DD.MMM.YYYY)
- Place of birth (Province, or city/province/state if born abroad)
- Place of issue (Province, or city/province/state of diplomatic/consular authority if issued abroad)
- Date of expiry (DD.MMM.YYYY)
- Authority ("National Immigration Administration, PRC" for single travel or "Exit & Entry Administration, Ministry of Public Security" or the Chinese diplomatic and consular mission)
- Machine Readable Code

===== Biometric passport =====
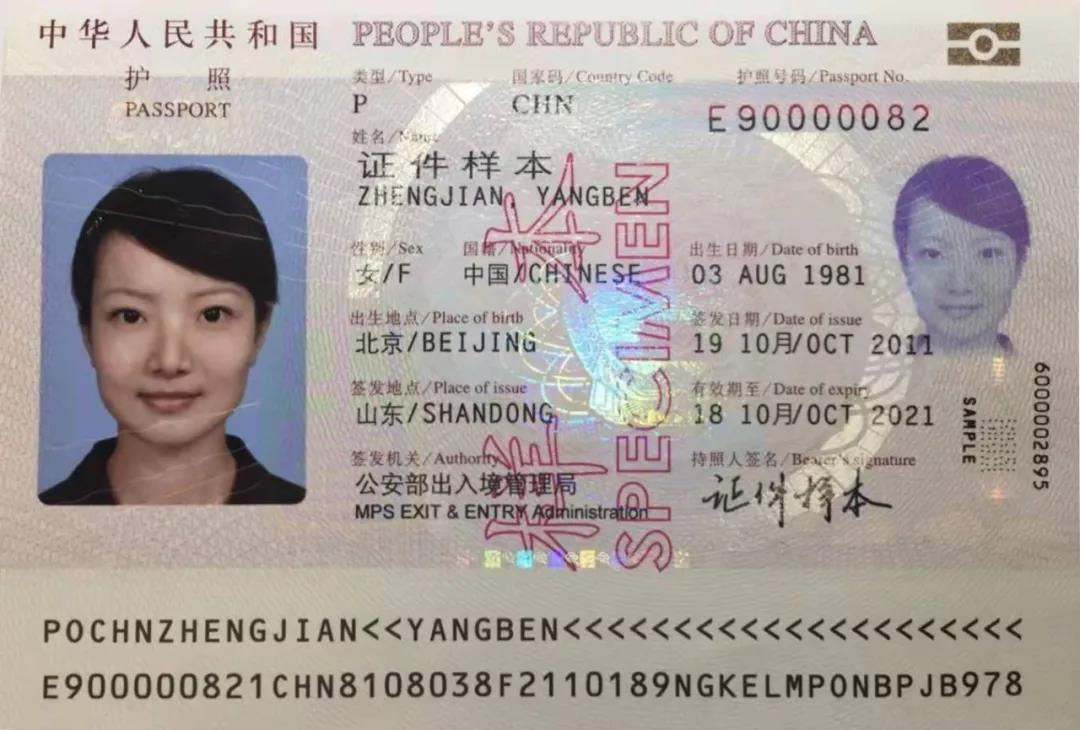
Inside page of a PRC Ordinary E-Passport, 2012 version

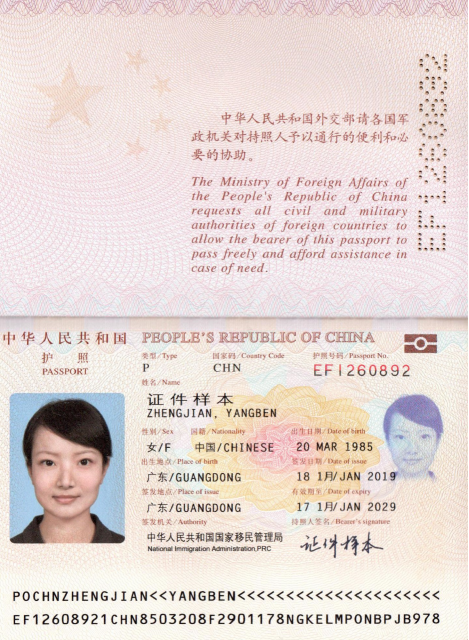
Inside page of a PRC Ordinary E-Passport, 2019 version

In the biometric Passport, the personal data page was moved to a separate sheet of paper, and the design of personal data page has been amended significantly, adding the full name of PRC in Simplified Chinese and English on top along with an e-passport symbol printed with optically variable ink. New security features include a second ghost image of the holder and additional holographic graphs including the PRC emblem and the laser-printed world map. The details included are as follows:

- Passport code (P)
- Country Code (CHN)
- Passport number (E########) - consists of one letter indicating passport type (E = e-passport), followed by eight digits. As of April 2017, over 100 million ordinary biometric passports had been issued and old E+8 digits type passport numbers had been used up. So the number format has been extended by using the second digit and replacing it with the English letters in order (except I, O) the third digit is still Arabic numerals, and the total number of digits is still 9. New passport numbers started with EA0000001 (two letters with seven digits).
- Name (Chinese characters on top, Pinyin transcription on bottom, a comma separates surname and given names in Pinyin only)
- Sex (M/F)
- Nationality (Chinese)
- Date of birth (DD.MMM.YYYY)
- Place of birth (Province with romanized transcription, or the country code if born abroad, along with Chinese abbreviation of the country)
- Date of issue (DD.MMM.YYYY, month is transcribed into Arabic numerals)
- Place of issue (Province, or city of diplomatic/consular authority if issued abroad)
- Date of expiry (DD.MMM.YYYY, month is transcribed into Arabic numerals)
- Authority ("National Immigration Administration, PRC" or the full name of the Chinese diplomatic/consular authority, if issuing in mainland China before June 2019 it may be "MPS Exit & Entry Administration")
- Bearer's signature
- Machine Readable Code

==== Languages ====
All information is printed in Simplified Chinese and English, except for the "Attentions" page, which is only printed in Simplified Chinese.

==== Passport Note ====
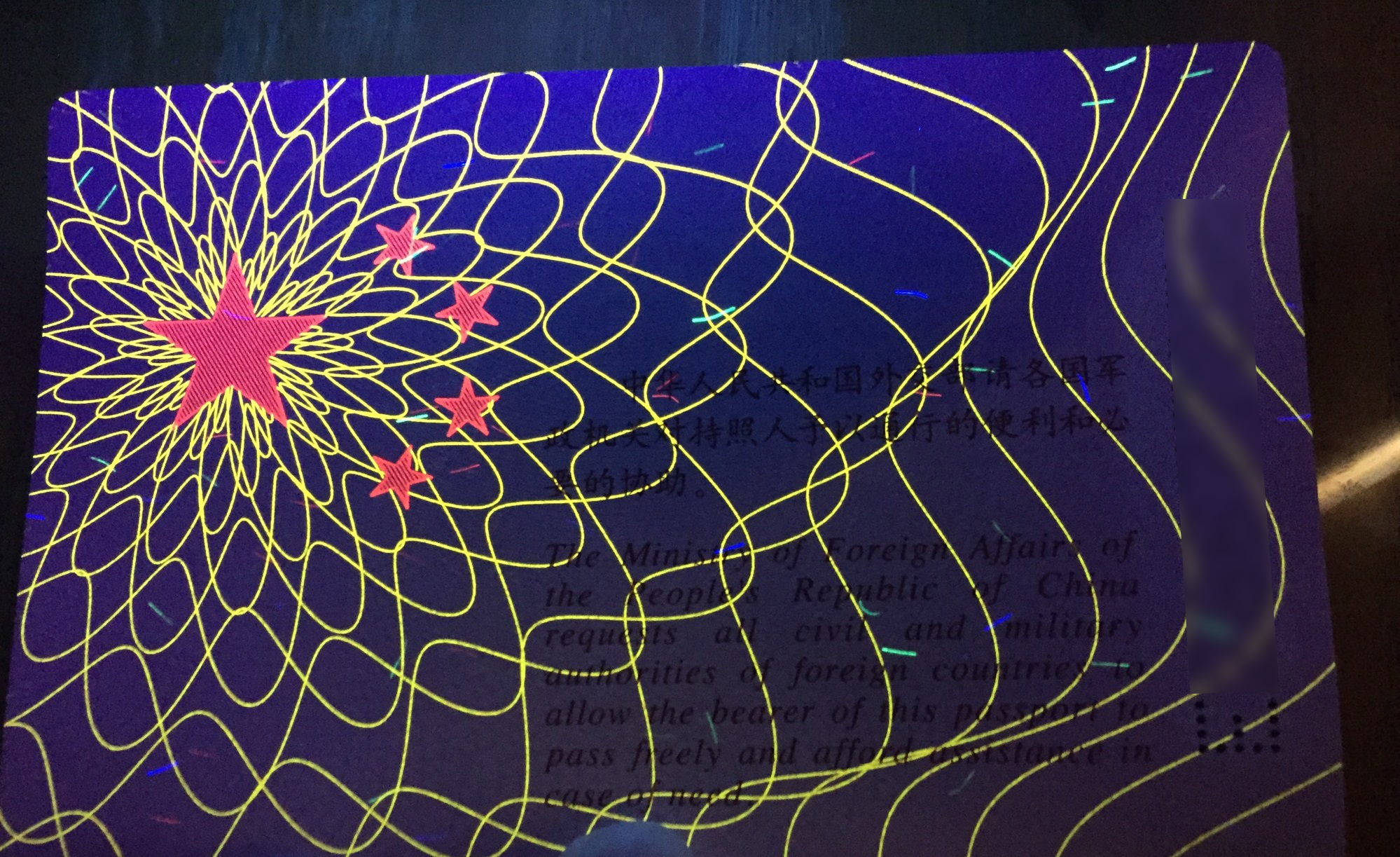
Anti-counterfeiting design in note page glows under black light

- In Simplified Chinese:

中华人民共和国外交部请各国军政机关对持照人予以通行的便利和必要的协助。

- In English:

The Ministry of Foreign Affairs of the People's Republic of China requests all civil and military authorities of foreign countries to allow the bearer of this passport to pass freely and afford assistance in case of need.

- In French (1982 version only):

Le Ministère des Affaires étrangères de la République populaire de Chine prie les autorités civiles et militaires des pays étrangers de laisser passer librement le titulaire de ce passeport et de lui prêter aide et assistance en cas de besoin.

==== Inner pages ====
In the biometric version, selected natural landmarks and famous sights from mainland China, Hong Kong, Macau, and Taiwan are printed on the inner pages. Each page also features a transparent watermark depicting another landmark from the same region.

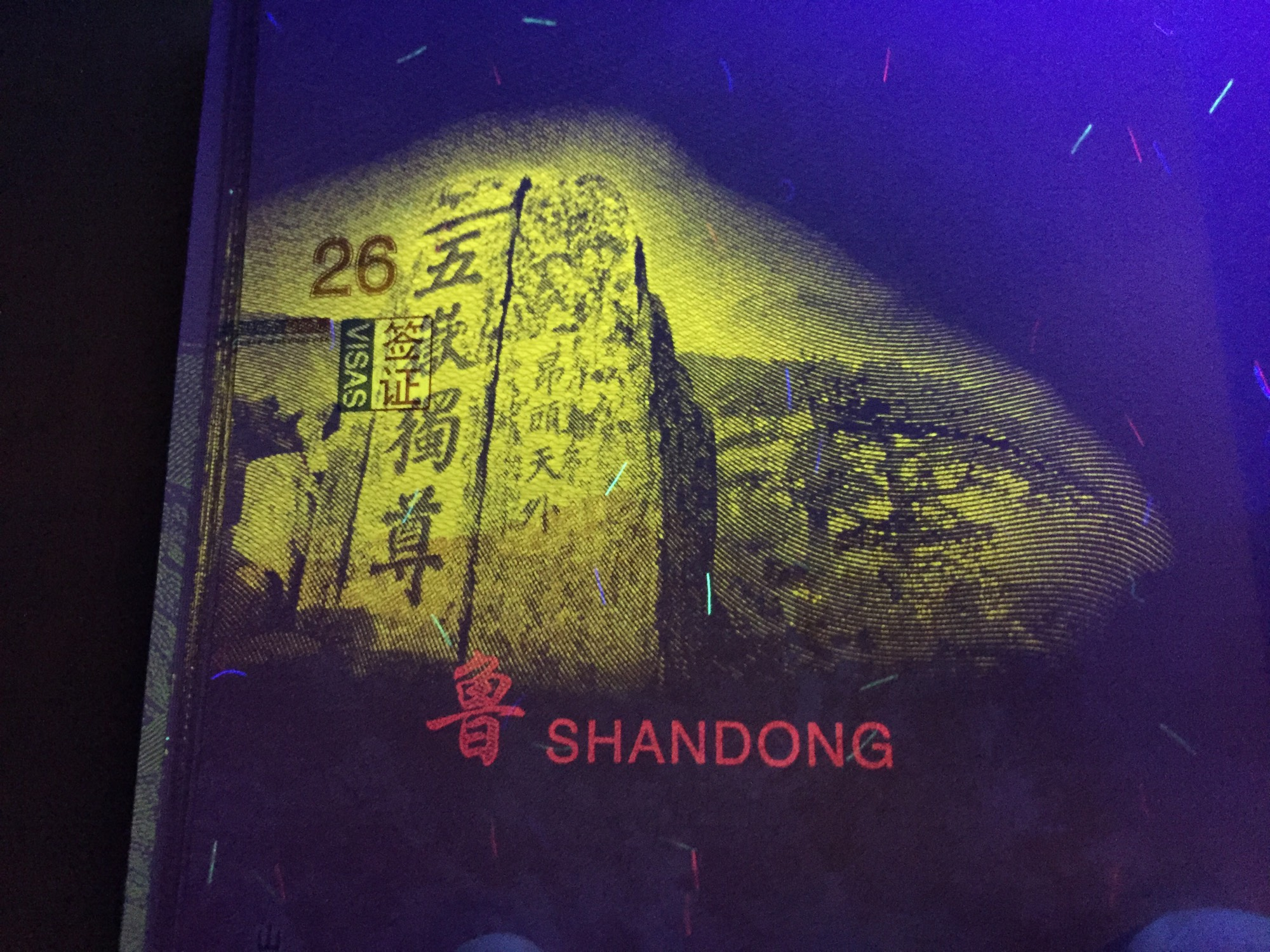
Transparent pattern on page 26 under black light

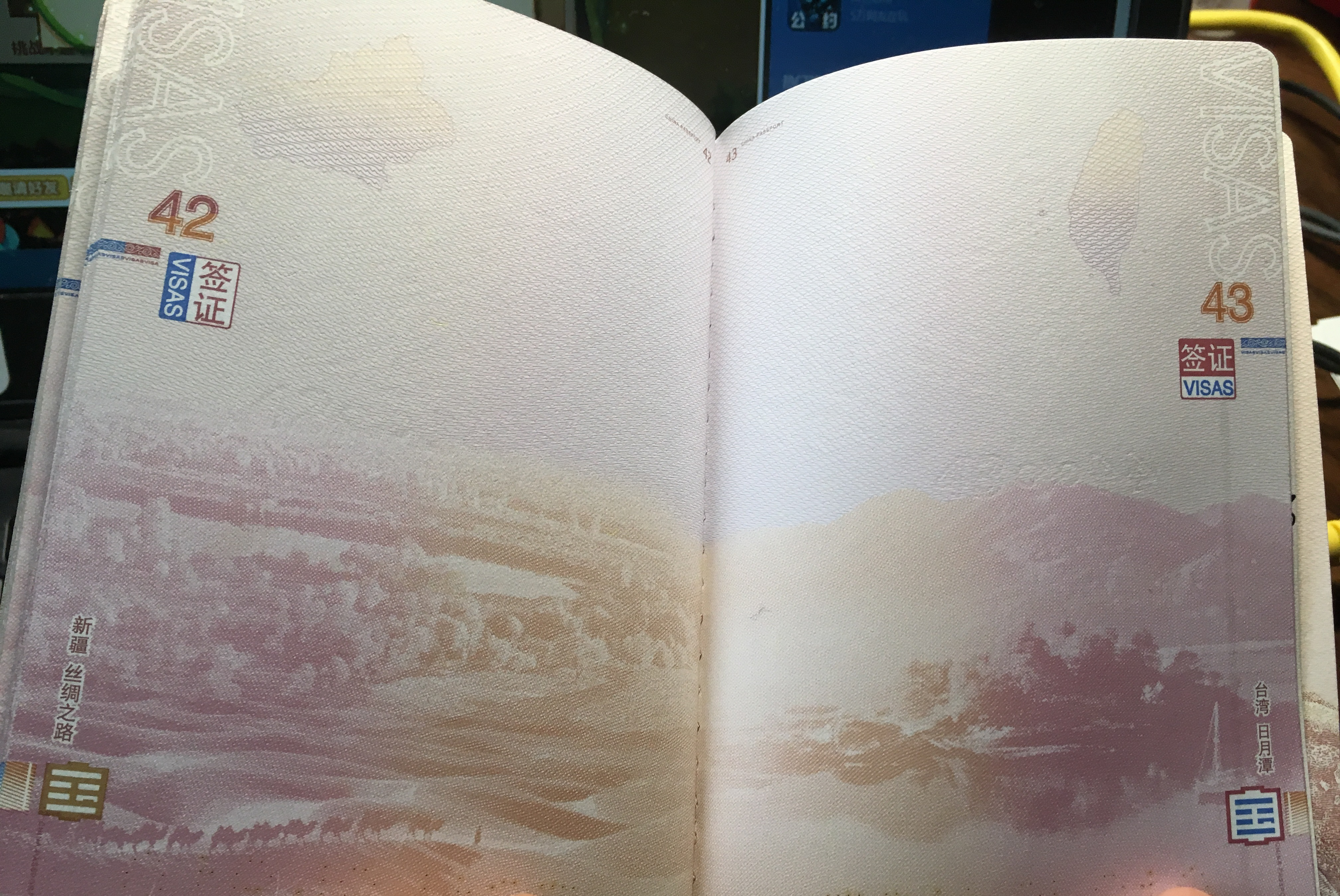
Xinjiang and Taiwan on page 42 and 43

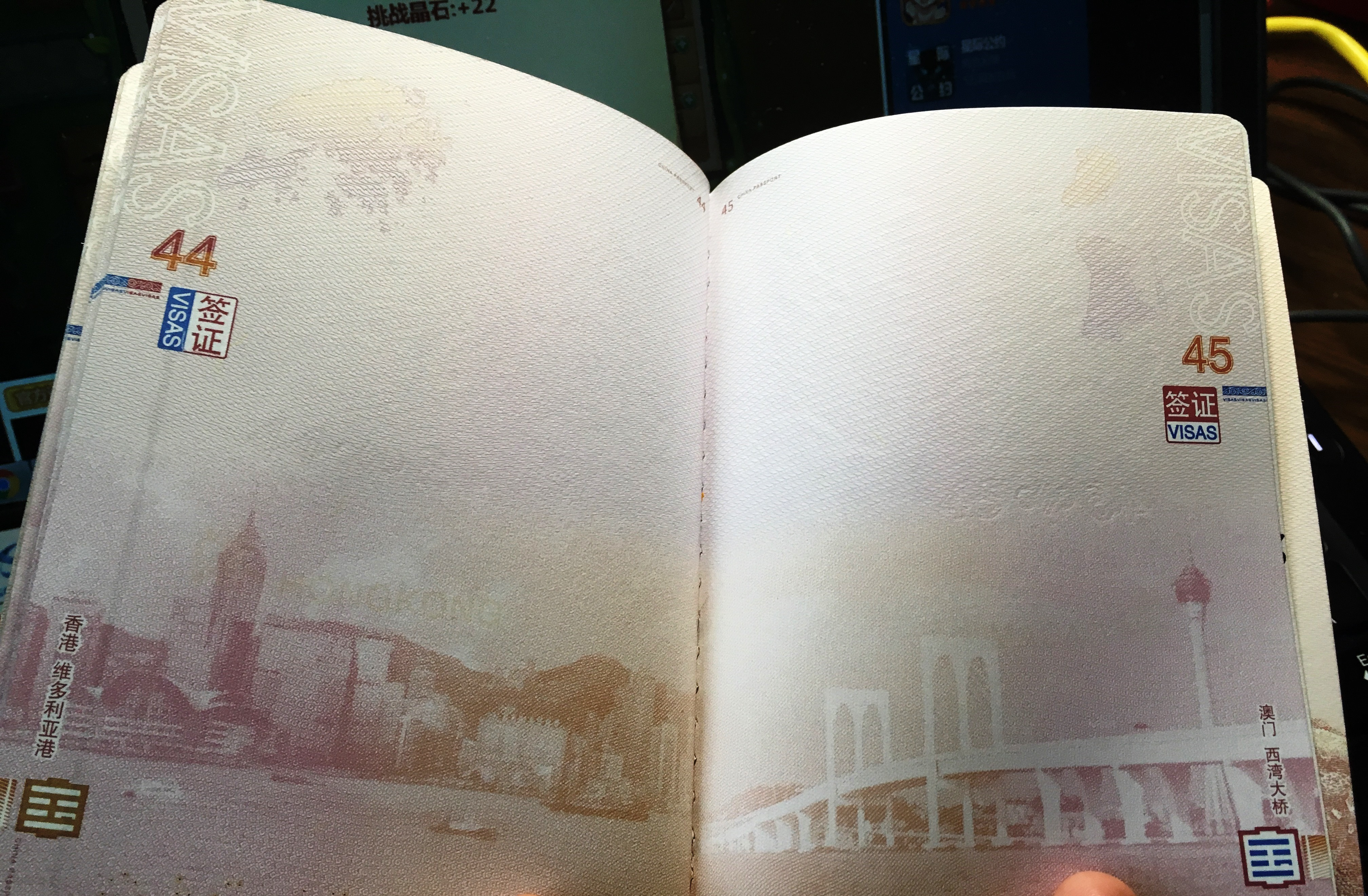
Hong Kong and Macau on page 44 and 45

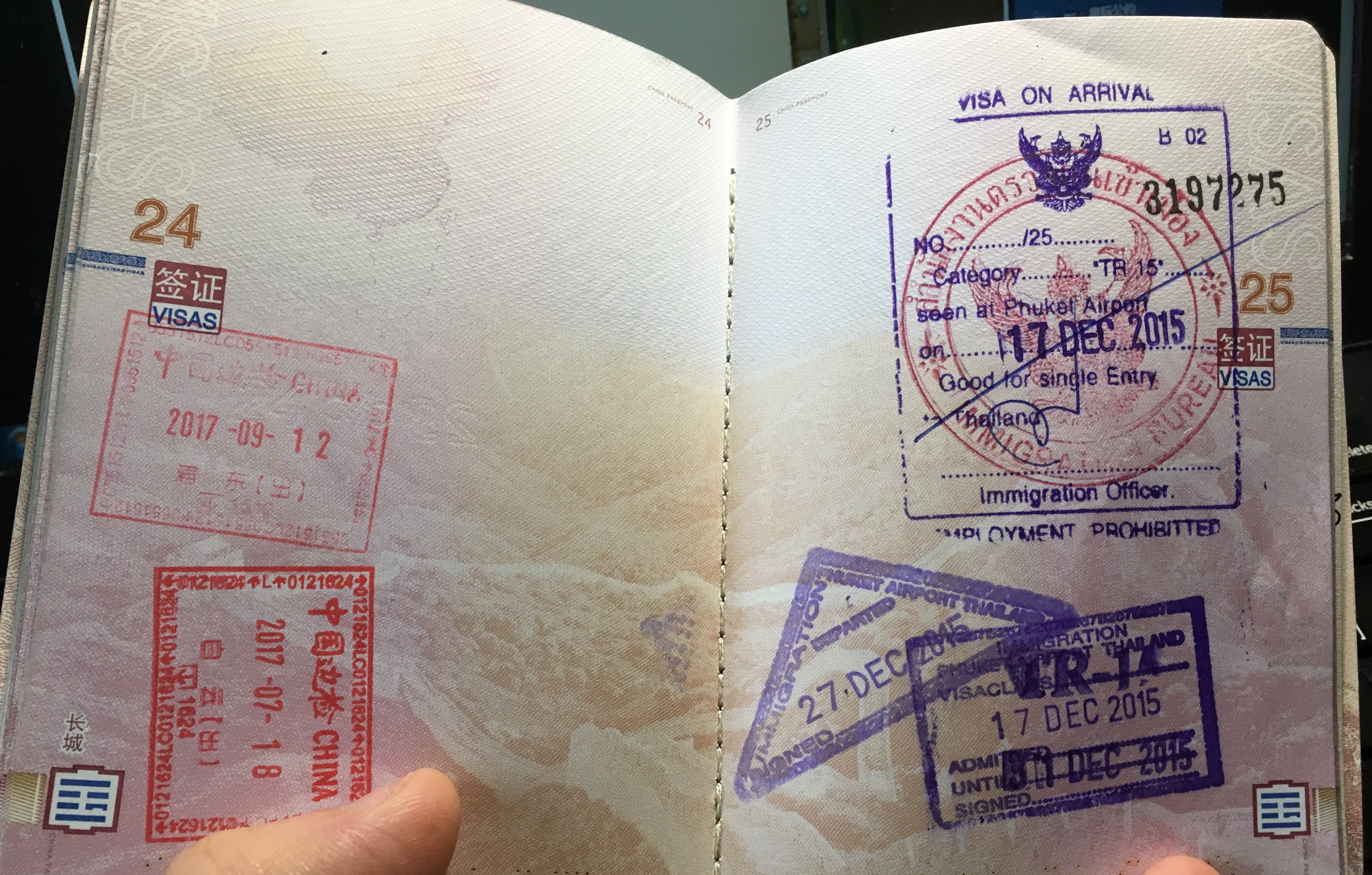
Page 24 and 25: Great wall and Map of China (including Taiwan and the nine-dash line)

Page	Division	Pattern	Transparent Pattern
8-9		Map of China; Tian'anmen Square	Tian'anmen Square
10	Beijing	Forbidden City	Summer Palace
11	Tianjin	Hai River	Binhai New Area
12	Hebei Province	Shanhai Pass	Laolongtou Great Wall
13	Shanxi Province	Hukou Waterfall	Pingyao Ancient City
14	Inner Mongolia	Prairie of Hulunbuir	Yurt
15	Liaoning Province	Xinghai Square	Industrial Base
16	Jilin Province	Hard rime	Houses of Jilin
17	Heilongjiang Province	Sun Island	Flood Control Monument
18	Shanghai	Lujiazui	The Bund
19	Jiangsu Province	Classical Gardens of Suzhou	Nanjing Yangtze River Bridge; Master of the Nets Garden
20	Zhejiang Province	Three Ponds Mirroring the Moon of West Lake	Distant view of West Lake
21	Anhui Province	Huangshan	Ancient Villages in Southern Anhui
22	Fujian Province	Wuyi Mountains	Fujian Tulou
23	Jiangxi Province	Jinggang Mountains	Mount Lu
24-25		Great Wall of China	
26	Shandong Province	Shibapan of Mount Tai	Rock inscriptions at Mount Tai
27	Henan Province	Longmen Grottoes	Shaolin Monastery
28	Hubei Province	Three Gorges Dam	Wudang Mountains
29	Hunan Province	Zhangjiajie	Fenghuang Ancient City
30	Guangdong Province	Mount Danxia	The Five Rams sculpture
31	Guangxi Autonomous Region	Elephant Trunk Hill	Guilin Scenery
32	Hainan Province	Coconut Grove	Tianya Haijiao
33	Chongqing	Kuimen	Chaotianmen
34	Sichuan Province	Dujiangyan irrigation system	Mount Qingcheng
35	Guizhou Province	Huangguoshu Waterfall	Miao Village
36	Yunnan Province	Stone Forest	Old Town of Lijiang
37	Tibet Autonomous Region	Potala Palace	Yarlung Tsangpo Grand Canyon
38	Shaanxi Province	Terracotta Army	Pagoda Hill
39	Gansu Province	Mogao Caves	Crescent Lake
40	Qinghai Province	Qinghai–Tibet Railway	Kumbum Monastery
41	Ningxia Autonomous Region	Shahu	Western Xia tombs
42	Xinjiang Autonomous Region	Silk Road	Desert and dunes
43	Taiwan Province	Sun Moon Lake	Qingshui Cliff
44	Hong Kong Special Administrative Region	Victoria Harbour	
45	Macau Special Administrative Region	Sai Van Bridge	Ruins of St. Paul's
46	Beijing	Hall of Prayer for Good Harvests of Temple of Heaven	Circular Mound Altar of Temple of Heaven

==== Last page ====
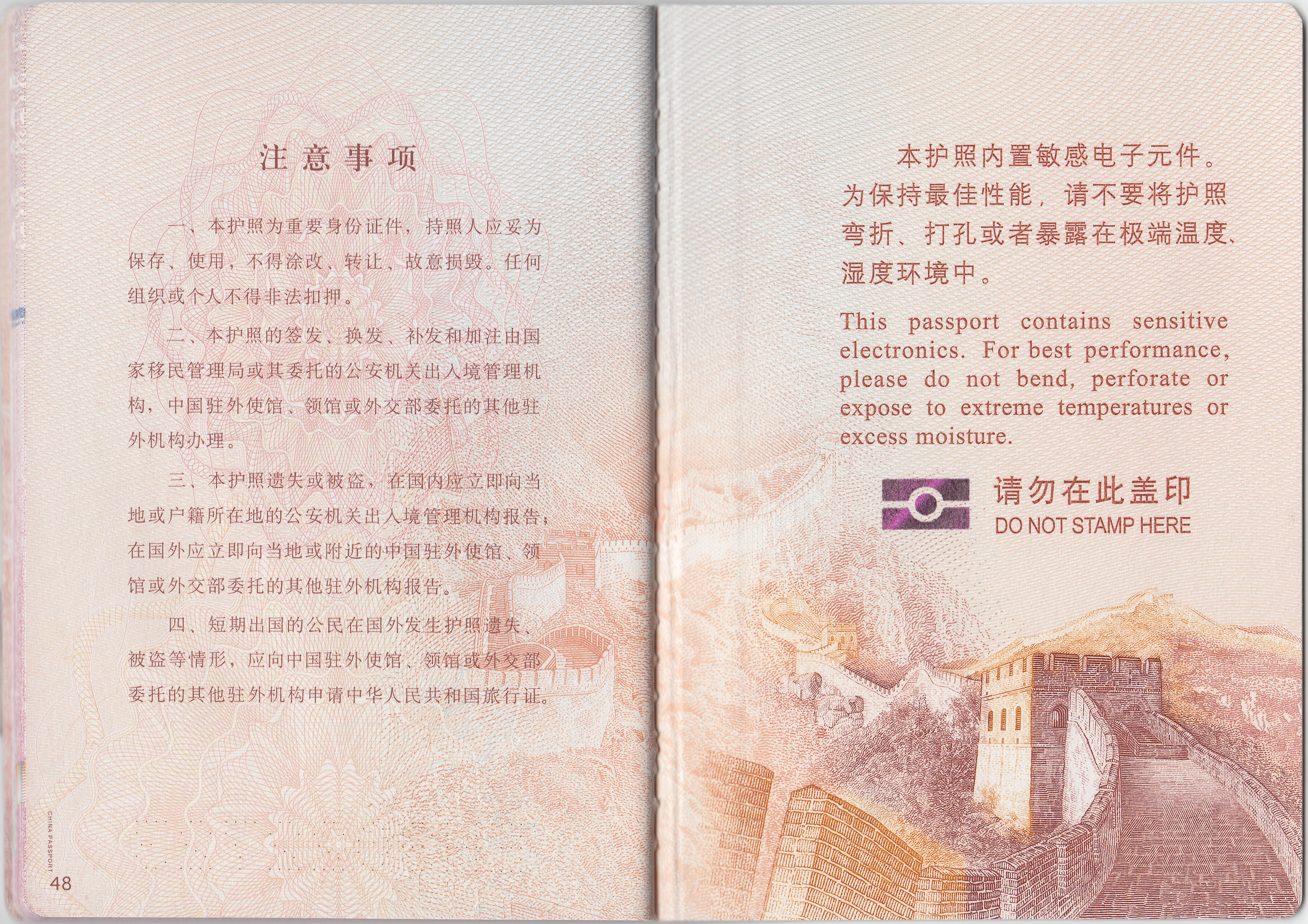
The note on the last page

The last page has the notes for the passport. For e-passport, inside the backcover, a caution for the biometric chip is written in both Chinese and English:

本护照内置敏感电子元件。为保持最佳性能，请不要将护照折弯、打孔或者暴露在极端温湿度环境。
This passport contains sensitive electronics. For best performance, please do not bend, perforate or expose to extreme temperatures or excess moisture.
请勿在此盖印 DO NOT STAMP HERE

== Fee and processing time ==
The fee for a Chinese passport is CNY 120. When applying for a passport overseas, the fee is US$25 or €20. No extra fees are charged for expedited processing if approved.

Normal processing time is 10 business days when applying from mainland China, and 15 business days from Chinese diplomatic missions outside mainland China (including Hong Kong and Macau). In some Regions, processing time is 7 business days such as Shanghai City if application was submitted electronically (online or by cell phone APPs such as WeChat). Expedited processing is available for 5 business days, but is only available if the applicants have genuine emergencies, such as they have deceased relatives abroad, their first day of school is near, or they have unused visas in old passports that are expiring soon.

== Special administrative region passports ==
=== Hong Kong ===
The Hong Kong Special Administrative Region passport (Chinese: 香港特別行政區護照) is a passport issued to permanent residents of Hong Kong who also hold Chinese citizenship. In accordance with the Basic Law of the Hong Kong Special Administrative Region, since the handover in 1997, the passport has been issued by the Immigration Department of the Government of Hong Kong under the authorisation of the Central People's Government of the People's Republic of China. As the official languages of Hong Kong are Chinese and English, the passport is printed bilingually in both Chinese (traditional characters) and English.

=== Macau ===
The Macao Special Administrative Region passport (Chinese: 澳門特別行政區護照; Portuguese: Passaporte da Região Administrativa Especial de Macau) is a passport issued to Chinese citizens who are permanent residents of the Chinese Special Administrative Region of Macau. While both "Macao" and "Macau" are used interchangeably, "Macao" is the officially adopted English-language spelling for the SAR's government and its official documents, including the passport.

== Non-passport travel documents ==
The following travel documents are also issued by mainland China to Chinese citizens who may or may not qualify for a Chinese passport for various reasons:

=== Chinese Travel Document ===
The People's Republic of China Travel Document (Chinese: 中华人民共和国旅行证) is a type of travel document issued by Chinese embassies, consulates, and other foreign offices to Chinese citizens for their international travel to China and other countries. The bearer of the Travel Document is legally a Chinese citizen in accordance with the Nationality Law.

=== Exit-Entry Permit for Travelling to and from Hong Kong and Macau ===
The Hong Kong and Macao Travel Permit (alternatively known as the Exit-Entry Permit for Travelling to and from Hong Kong and Macao; colloquially as Two-way Permit or EEP) is a travel document issued by the Exit and Entry Administration of the People's Republic of China. This card-size biometric document is issued to Chinese citizens residing in the mainland for traveling to and returning from Hong Kong and Macau for personal purposes.

=== Permit for Proceeding to Hong Kong and Macao ===
The Permit for Proceeding to Hong Kong and Macao, colloquially known as the One-way Permit, is a travel document issued by the Exit and Entry Administration of the People's Republic of China. This passport-size document is issued for its bearers, Chinese citizens residing in the mainland with relatives in Hong Kong or Macau, to proceed to the special administrative regions for residency.

=== Taiwan Travel Permit ===
The Taiwan Travel Permit (Note: "Taiwan Travel Permit" is the official English name used by the Chinese government for this document.) is a travel document issued by the Exit and Entry Administration of the People's Republic of China. This card-size biometric document is issued for its bearers, Chinese citizens residing in the mainland, to travel from the mainland to the Taiwan Area for personal, business, or other purposes.

== Automatic immigration clearance (e-Channel) ==
Holders of Chinese biometric passports may use automatic immigration clearance, known as e-Channel. These lanes are available at major international airports in mainland China, including Beijing Capital, Shanghai Pudong, Shanghai Hongqiao, Guangzhou Baiyun and Chengdu Tianfu, as well as at land border crossings in Shenzhen and Zhuhai.

E-Channel was originally introduced for returning Chinese citizens. Eligibility requires a biometric passport with fingerprint data stored on the chip. Travelers whose passports lack fingerprint data must first register with National Immigration Administration at an international airport or land border checkpoint.

Starting from August 19, 2016, passengers are able to use the e-Gates in terminal 2 of Beijing Capital International Airport to complete exit procedures from China as well. Starting from Dec 1, 2017, Shanghai international airports including PVG and SHA both have e-Channel for exit.

=== Eligibility ===
The extended list of eligible travelers is:

Registration with NIA not required:

- Holders of biometric passports that contain fingerprint data;
- Holders of the new biometric Two-way Permits with valid entry endorsements that contain fingerprint data.

Registration with NIA required:

- Holders of the booklet-style Two-way Permits with multiple-entry endorsements;
- Holders of Travel Permit to and from Taiwan for Mainland Residents booklet with multiple-exit endorsements;
- Holders of Exit and Entry Permits that are valid for one year and multiple entries (only for the specific port of entry that they have registered with);
- Holders of Home Return Permits;
- Holders of Taiwan Compatriot Permits;
- Foreign nationals with their passports and Chinese Permanent Resident cards;
- Foreign nationals with their biometric passports and residence permits with a validity of more than 6 months; and
- Flight crew members serving scheduled flights who are either Chinese or visa-exempt nationals, or non-visa-exempt nationals holding crew or work visas or residence permits that are valid for at least 1 year.

== Visa requirements ==
Visa requirements map for Chinese citizens with an ordinary Chinese passport Mainland China Entry–Exit Permit for Hong Kong SAR and Macau SAR required Visa not required Visa available both on arrival or online Visa on arrival eVisa Visa required in advance Visa can be issued, but tourism admission highly possibly refused Tourism admission restricted

Visa requirements for Chinese citizens are administrative entry restrictions by the authorities of other states placed on citizens of the People's Republic of China. As of 2025, Chinese citizens had visa-free or visa on arrival access to 85 countries and territories, ranking the Chinese passport 60th in the world according to the Henley Passport Index. The latest visa exemption is granted by the Turkish government to all Chinese citizen for tourism purpose. Chinese passport is also the highest-ranked passport among Communist states. After Covid travel restriction was lifted, the resume of free-to-travel is on high demand as well as align to government's economic boosting strategy; Passport offices are also introducing new mobile-app allow hassle-free passport application or renew, together with video-call and facial recognition techniques to enable this service 24/7. According to Henley's report, Chinese Passport is the front runner for visa-free travel ranking among all countries. The Electronic Visa Update System (EVUS) is introduced in 2016 for Chinese passport holder who hold a valid 10-year B1, B2, or B1/B2 visa to travel to the United States.

=== Travel to and from Hong Kong, Macau, or Taiwan ===
Chinese passports cannot normally be used when travelling directly to Hong Kong, Macau, or Taiwan from mainland China, except for transiting to another country.

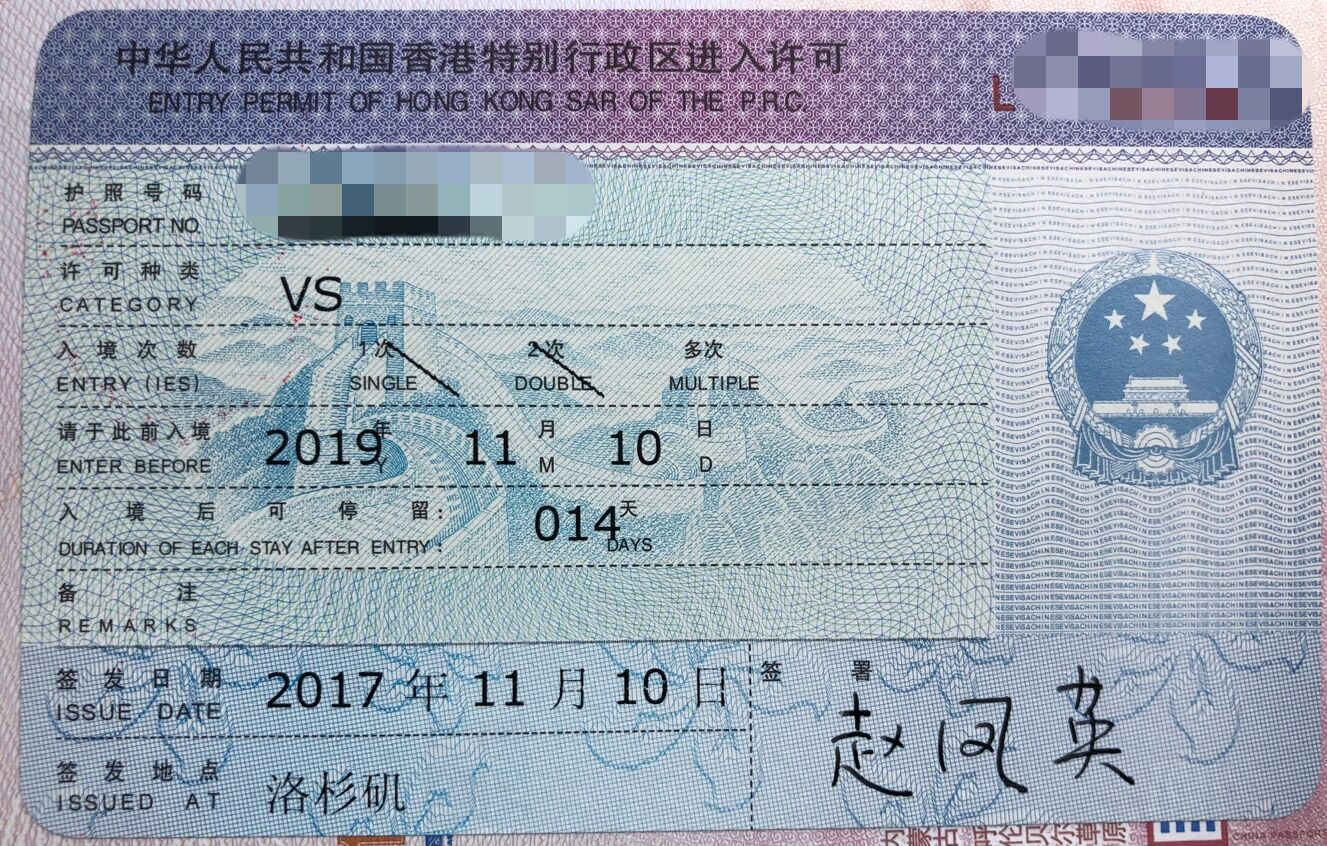
a Hong Kong Entry Permit issued by the Chinese consulate in Los Angeles pasted on a Chinese passport

In order for such Chinese citizens to travel from mainland China to Hong Kong and Macau, a Two-way Permit is required. Chinese foreign missions, however, do issue visa-like Hong Kong SAR Entry Permits for up to 30 days to Chinese citizens residing outside mainland China upon request, so PRC passport holders can travel solely between Hong Kong and Mainland with passports.

Travelling to Taiwan from mainland China requires the Travel Permit to and from Taiwan as well as Exit and Entry Permit issued by the Taiwanese government. Although Chinese passports are accepted as valid travel documents by the National Immigration Agency (NIA) and Taiwanese diplomatic missions, the NIA does not allow Chinese citizens with hukou to travel to Taiwan when departing from mainland China unless holding the Mainland Resident Travel Permit with valid exit endorsement.

== Cross border travel statistics ==
These are the numbers of mainland Chinese visitors to various countries or territories:

Destination	Number of visitors	Year
American Samoa	861	2016
Angola	76,016	2015
Antarctica	5,289	2017
Antigua and Barbuda	739	2017
Australia	1,355,500	2017
Austria (Note: Counting only guests in tourist accommodation establishments.)	731,100	2016
Azerbaijan	7,363	2016
Bahamas	782	2013
Barbados	646	2016
Belgium	147,654	2016
Belize	2,920	2013
Bhutan	6,421	2017
Bolivia	12,861	2016
Bosnia and Herzegovina	31,776	2017
Botswana	6,386	2015
Brazil	61,250	2017
Burkina Faso	2,568	2016
Cambodia	830,003	2016
Canada	694,543	2017
Cayman Islands (Note: Data for arrivals by air only.)	250	2017
Chile	30,774	2017
Colombia	11,528	2015
Congo	9,641	2012
Cook Islands	804	2017
Costa Rica	13,612	2017
Croatia	159,301	2017
Cuba	31,733	2015
Cyprus (Note: Including Hong Kong.)	5,032	2018
Czech Republic	491,648	2017
Denmark	221,000 (Note: Tourists only.)	2016
Dominica	354	2015
Dominican Republic	5,103	2017
Estonia	19,698	2017
Eswatini	2,732	2016
Fiji	48,796	2017
Finland	202,722	2018
France	2,196,995	2015
French Polynesia	4,479	2017
Germany	1,363,979	2016
Georgia	31,855	2018
Greece	55,097	2015
Guam	21,856	2017
Hong Kong Special Administrative Region	44,445,259	2017
Hungary	170,835	2016
Iceland	89,495	2018
India	247,235	2017
Indonesia	1,556,771	2016
Israel	113,600	2018
Italy	280,000	2016
Jamaica	3,892	2017
Japan	7,355,800	2017
Jordan	37,092	2016
Kazakhstan	94,817	2017
Kiribati	98	2017
Kyrgyzstan	29,900	2017
Laos	639,185	2017
Latvia	22,774	2017
Lebanon	6,227	2016
Lithuania	12,000	2016
Luxembourg	35,697	2016
Macao Special Administrative Region	22,196,203	2017
Madagascar	3,774	2015
Malaysia	2,281,666	2017
Malawi	4,715	2009
Maldives	306,530	2017
Mali	3,201	2014
Marshall Islands	118	2017
Mauritius	72,951	2017
Mexico	141,692	2017
Micronesia	2,817	2017
Mongolia	144,070	2017
Montenegro	7,932	2014
Morocco	118,000	2017
Myanmar	183,886	2016
Namibia	12,195	2015
Nepal	66,984	2015
Netherlands	365,000	2017
Niue	1	2017
New Caledonia	280	2017
New Zealand	417,872	2017
North Macedonia	6,565	2016
Northern Mariana Islands	229,389	2017
Oman	20,021	2017
Pakistan	30,100	2009
Palau	55,491	2017
Panama	17,293	2015
Papua New Guinea	12,937	2016
Peru	31,408	2017
Philippines	968,447	2017
Poland	97,700	2016
Qatar	45,627	2017
Romania	30,700	2016
Russia	1,780,200	2017
Samoa	2,718	2017
Serbia	184,042	2025
Seychelles	12,006	2017
Singapore	3,226,929	2017
Slovakia	41,332	2016
Slovenia	62,905	2017
Solomon Islands	1,215	2017
South Africa	84,691	2015
South Korea	4,169,353	2017
Spain	649,032	2018
Sri Lanka (Note: Including Hong Kong and Macau.)	268,952	2017
Suriname	5,511	2017
Taiwan	2,732,549	2017
Tanzania	34,472	2016
Tonga	2,021	2017
Thailand	9,805,753	2017
Timor-Leste (Note: Data for arrivals by air only.)	7,696	2017
Turkey	394,109	2018
Tuvalu	61	2017
Ukraine	29,561	2017
United Arab Emirates	764,000	2017
United Kingdom	358,000	2017
United States (Note: Total number includes tourists, business people, students, exchange visitors, temporary workers and families, diplomats and other representatives and all other classes of non-immigrant admissions (I-94).)	3,383,133	2017
Uzbekistan	11,800	2015
Vanuatu	3,612	2017
Vietnam	4,008,253	2017
Zambia	20,648	2016

== Gallery ==
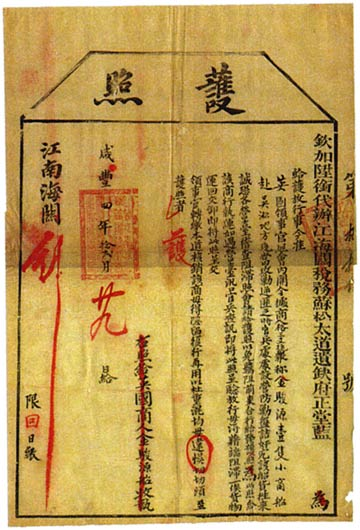
A passport issued by the Great Qing government in 1854.

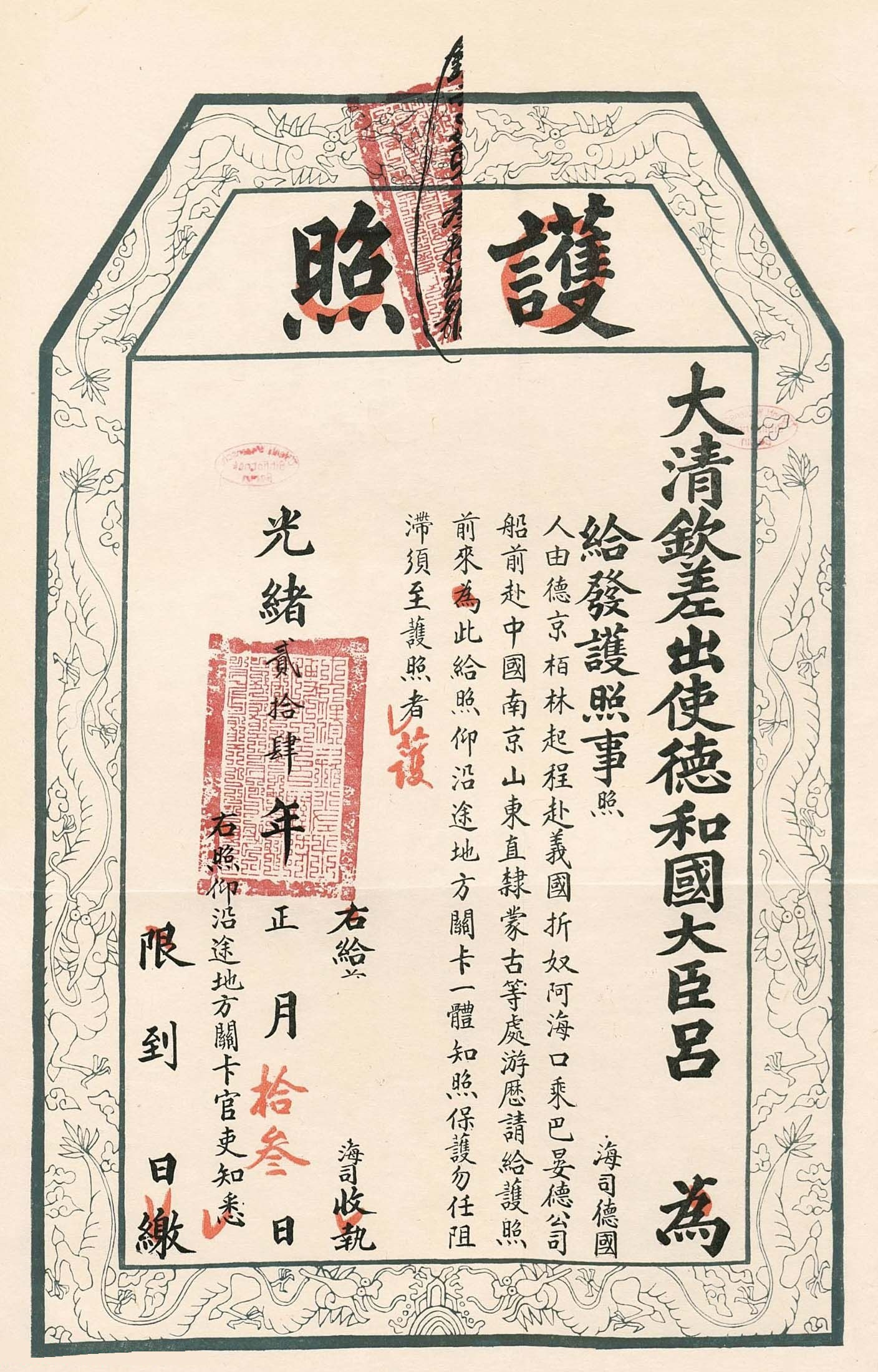
A passport issued by the Great Qing government in 1898.

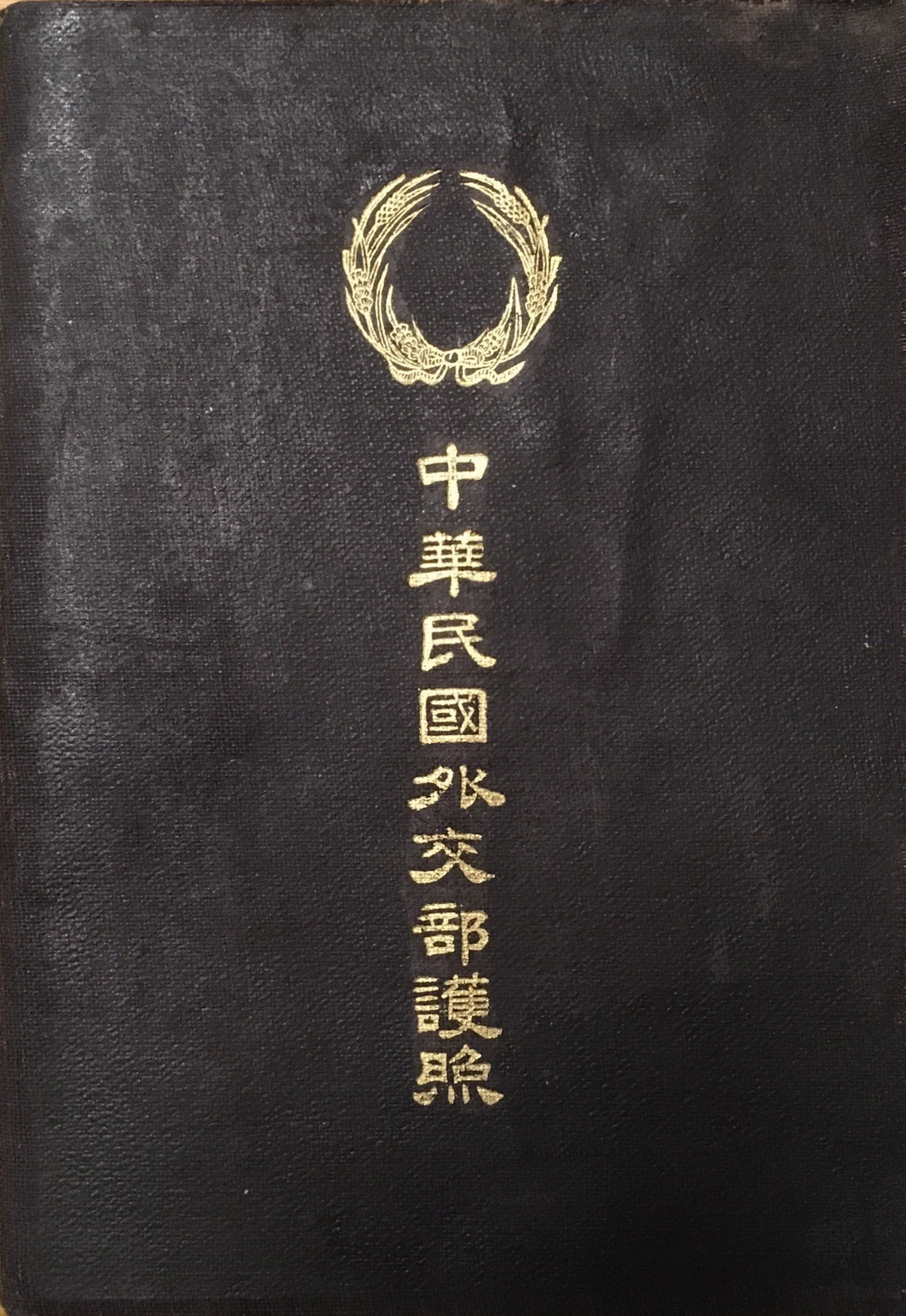
A Republic of China passport booklet issued during the Beiyang-era in the 1920s.

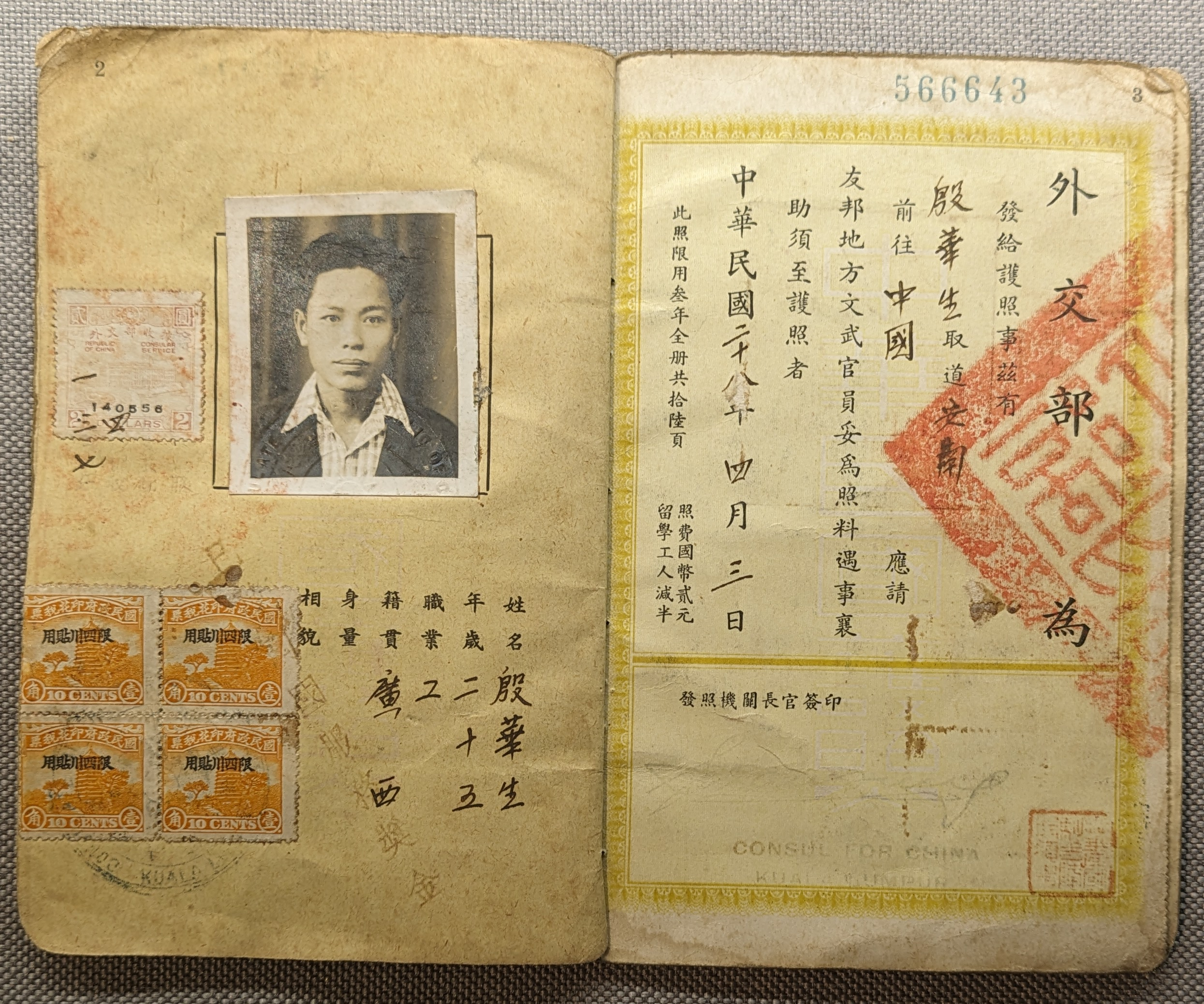
A Republic of China passport issued in 1939.

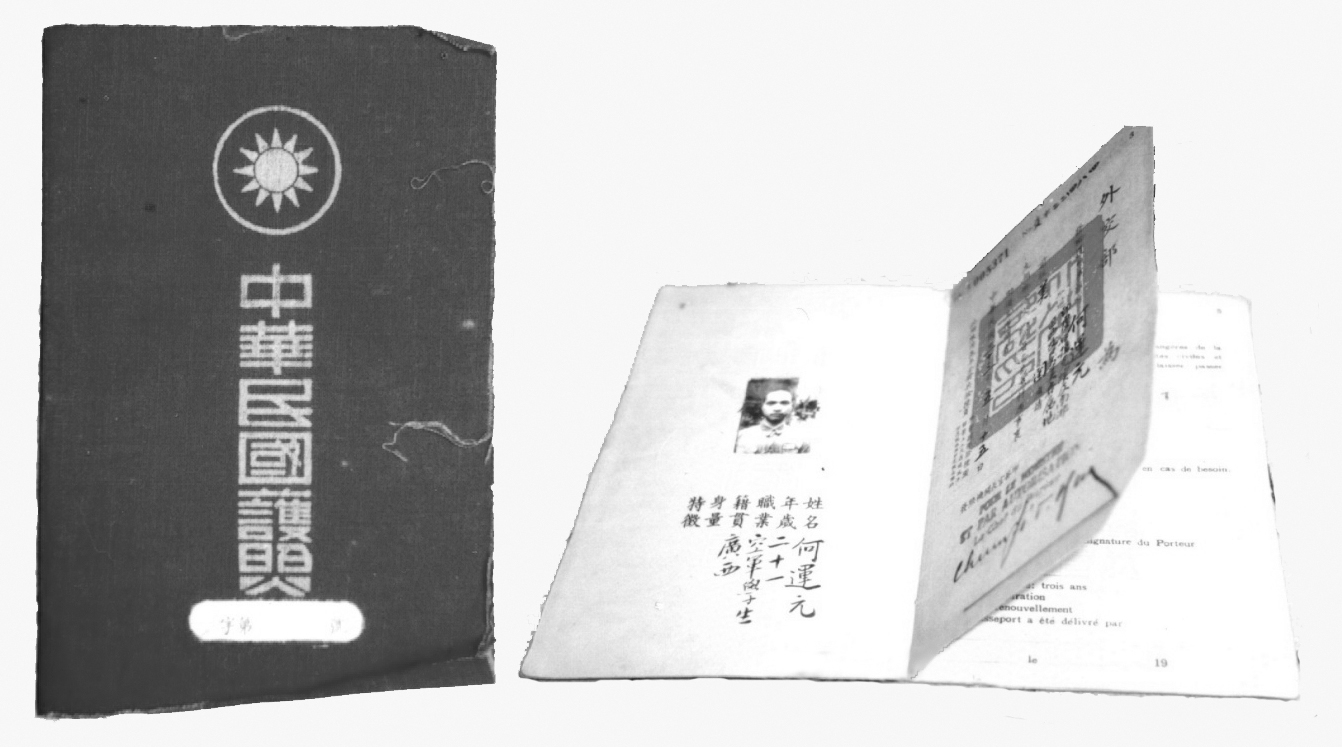
A Republic of China passport issued in 1946.

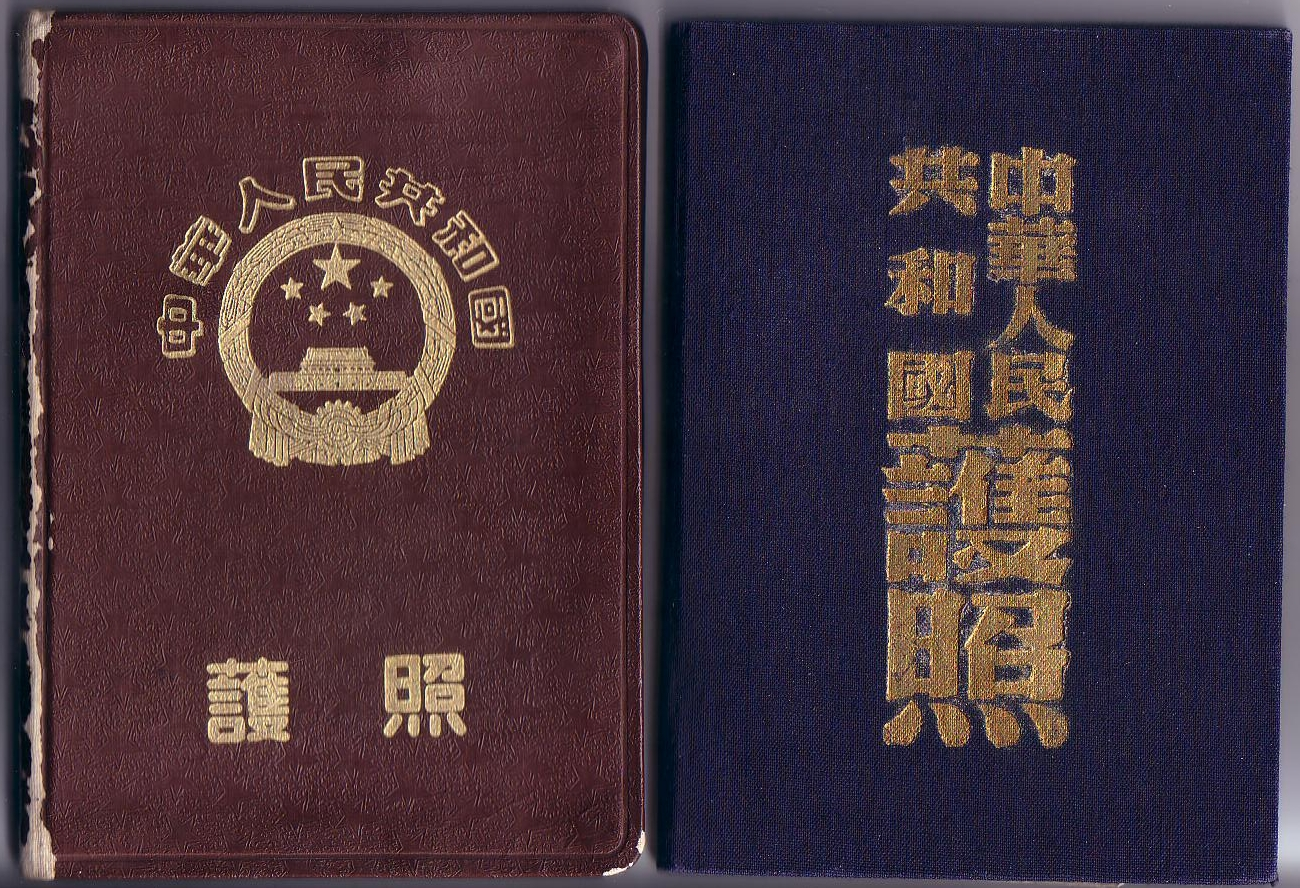
1955 (left) and 1951 (right) versions of the PRC passport.

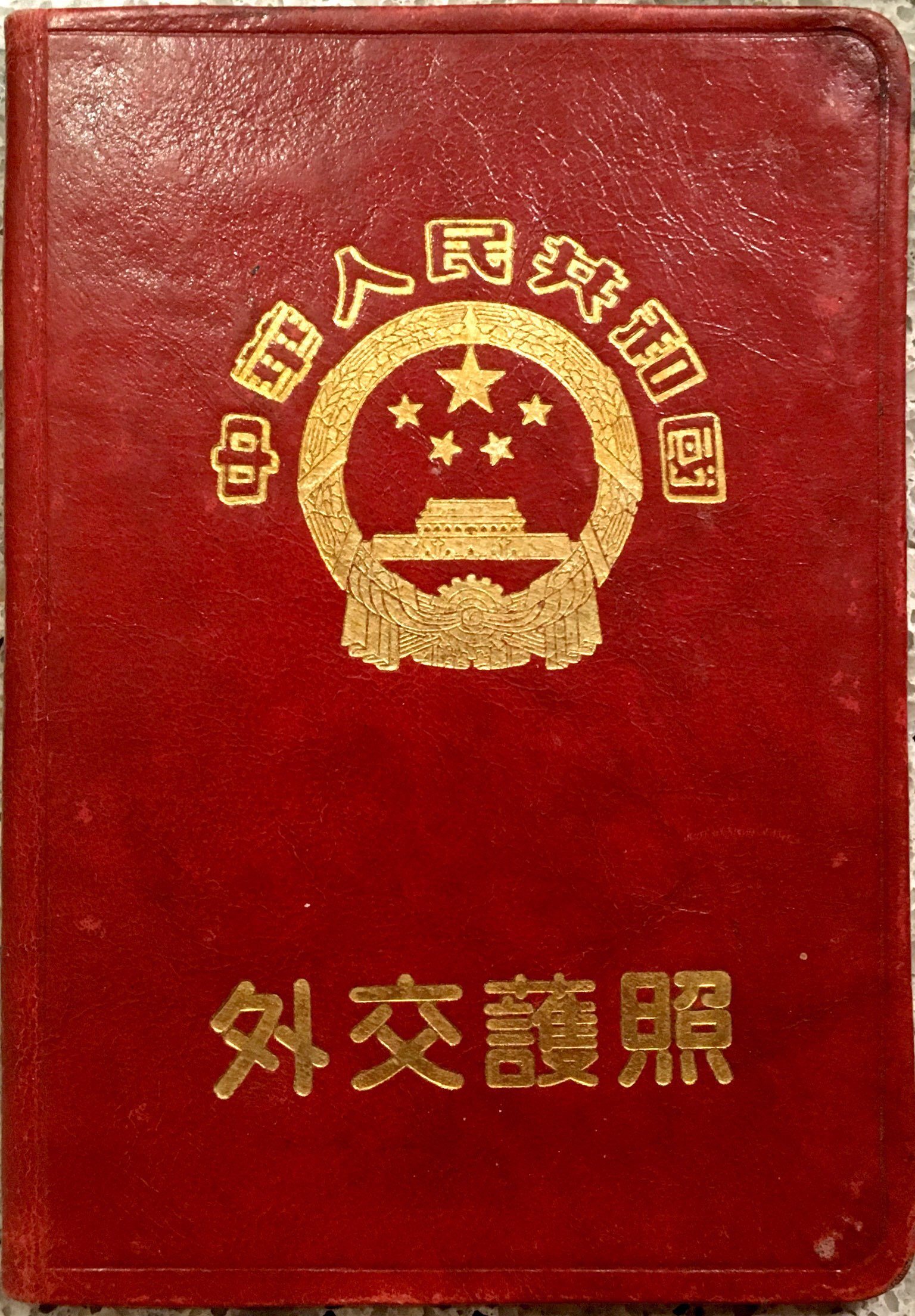
Type "55" diplomatic passport

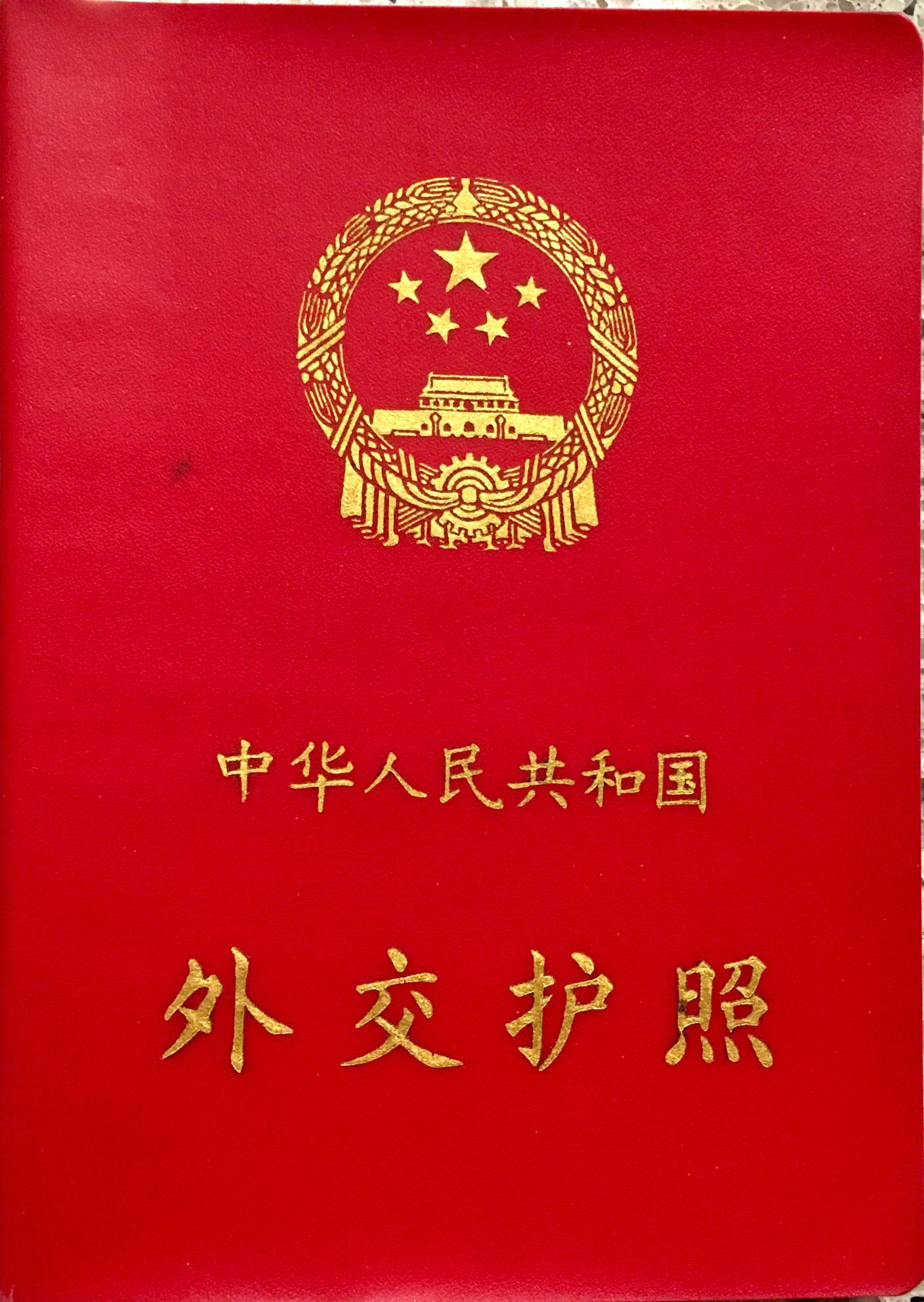
Type "82" diplomatic passport

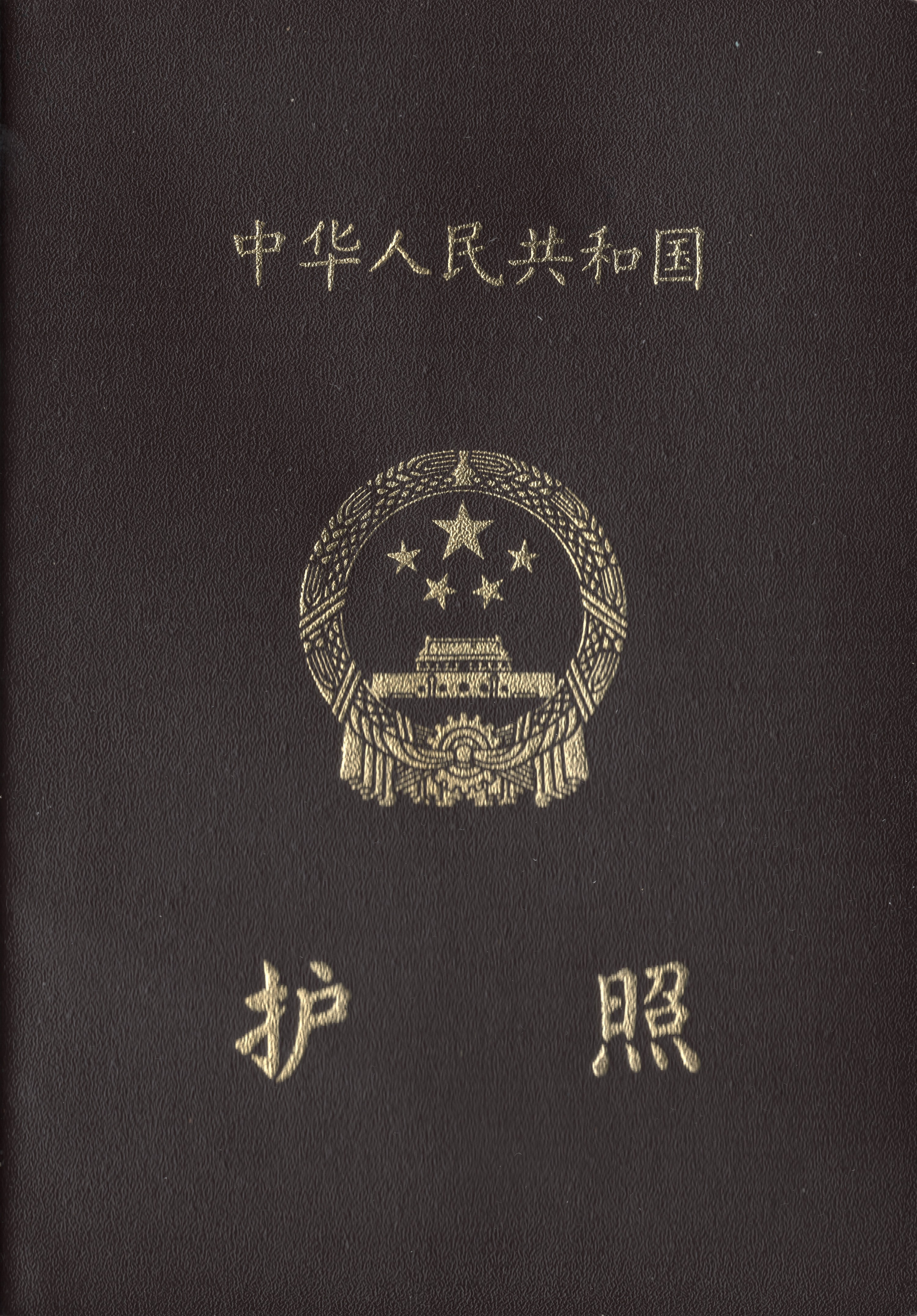
A Type "82" passport issued from early 80s to 1992

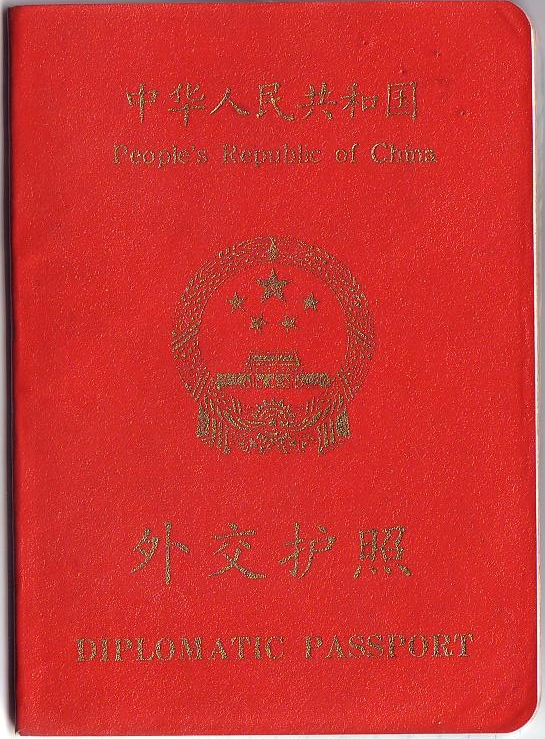
1992 version of diplomatic passport

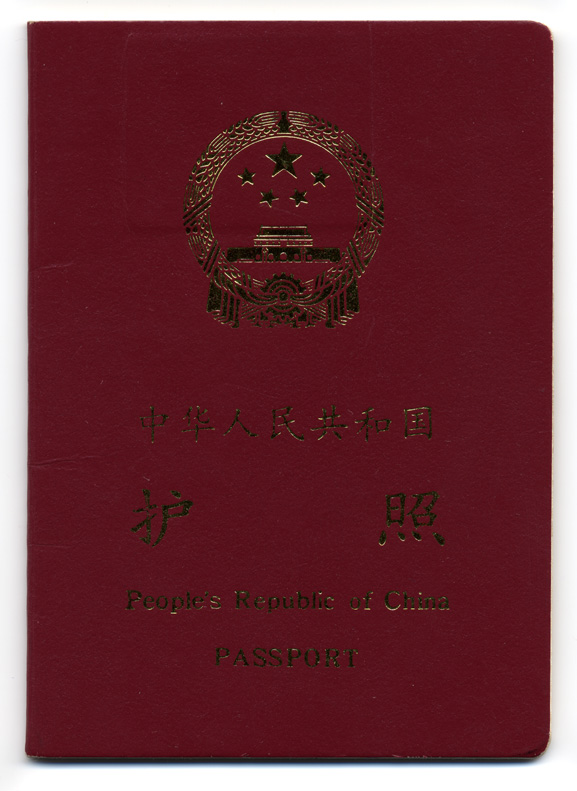
Cover of Type "92" passport, issued until early 2000s

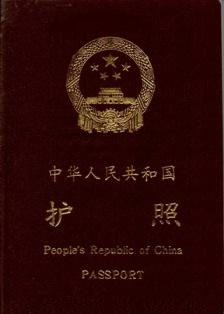
Type "97-1" passport, issued from 2000 to early 2007

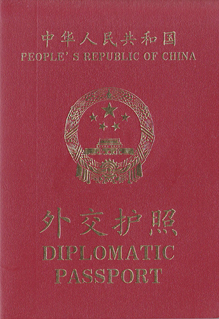
1997 version of diplomatic passport

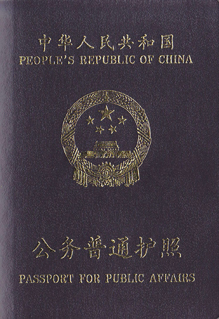
1997 version of public affairs passport

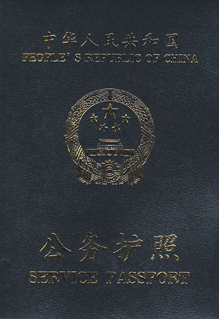
1997 version of service passport

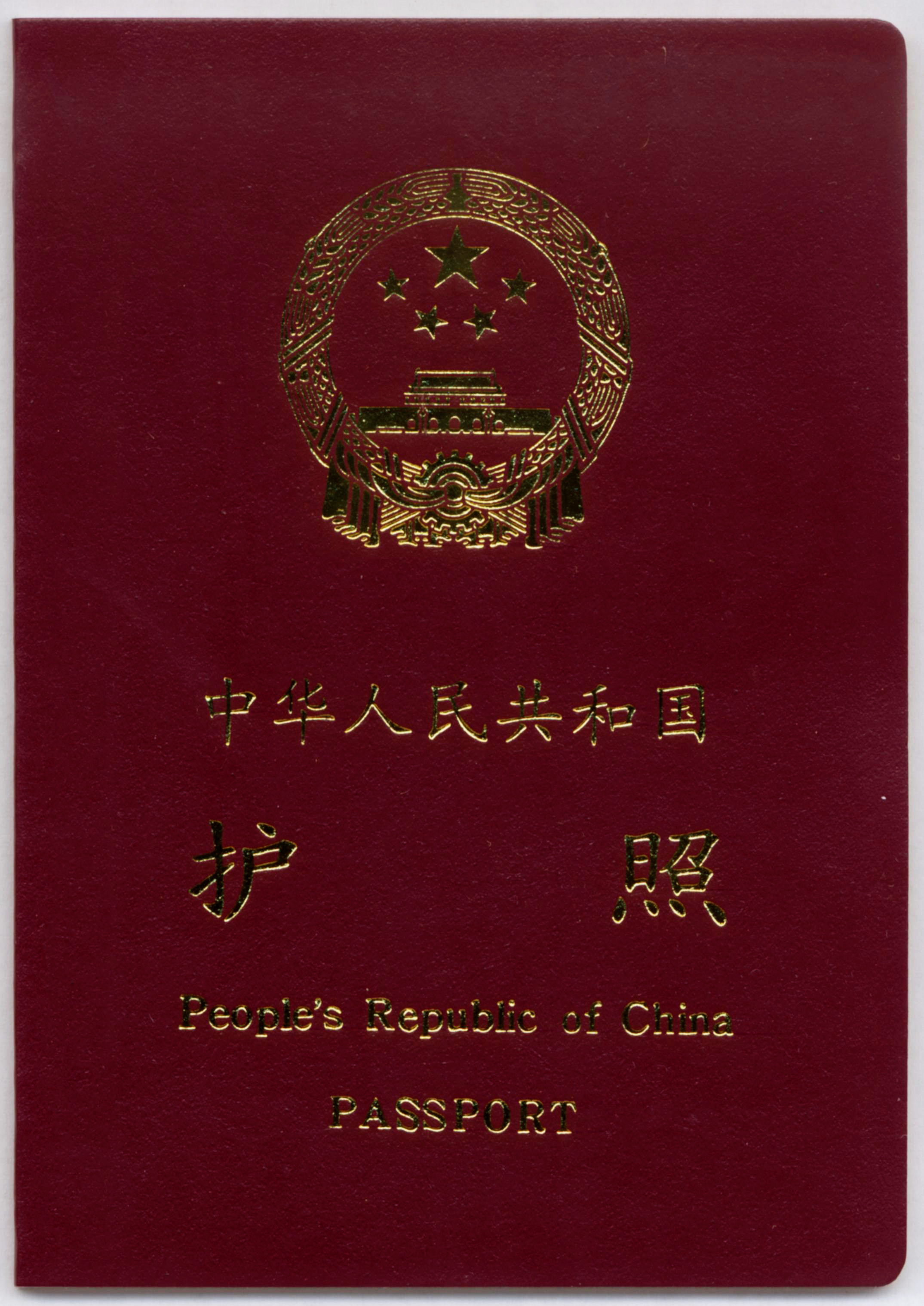
Type "97-2" passport, issued from early 2007 to May 2012

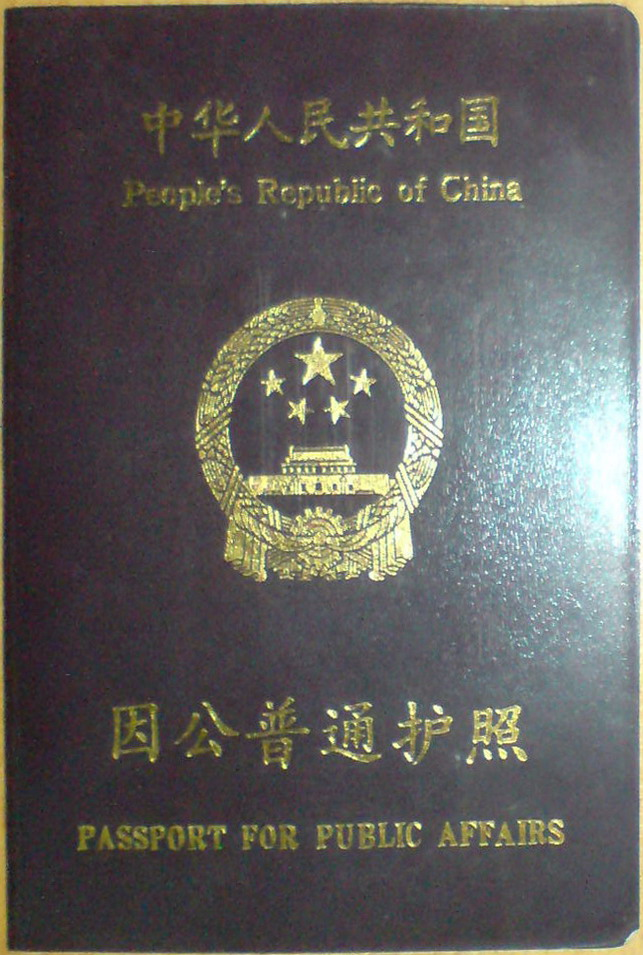
The old passport for public affairs, issued before 2007

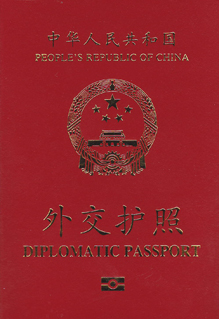
The old diplomatic passport, issued before 2021

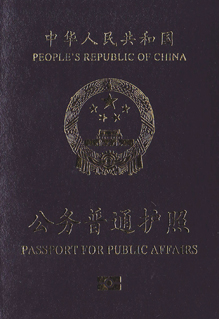
The old passport for public affairs, issued before 2023

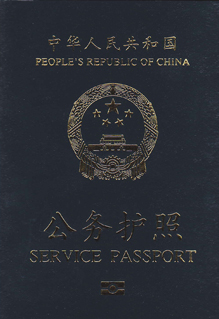
The old service passport, issued before 2023

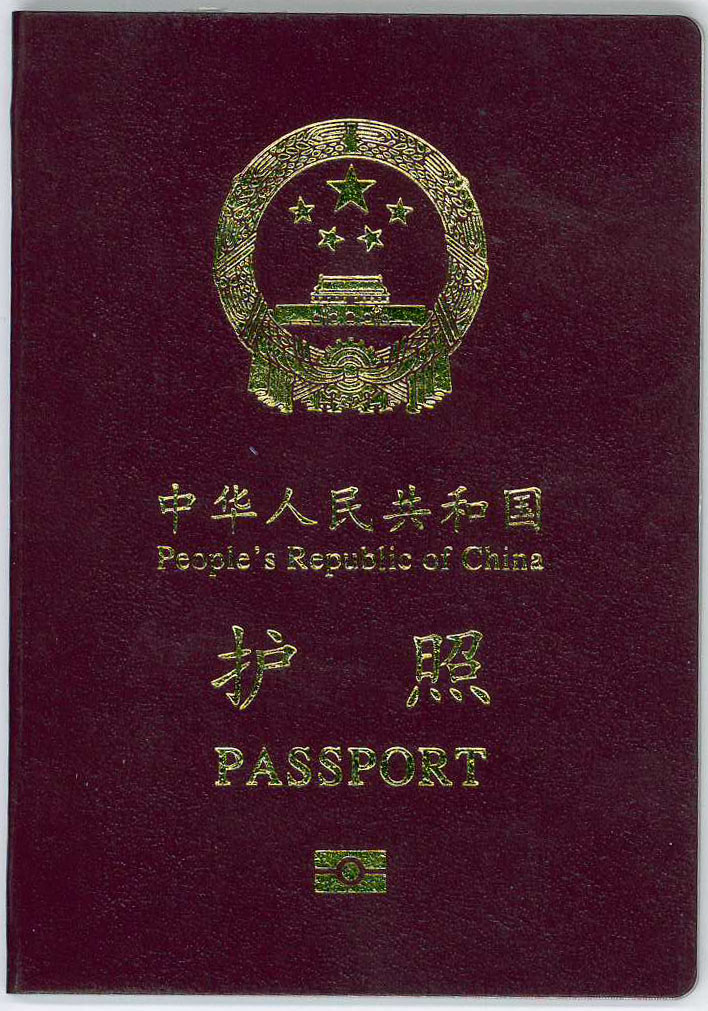
Biometric passport, issued since May 2012

== See also ==
- Chinese Travel Document
- Hong Kong SAR passport
- List of passports
- Macau SAR passport
- Nationality law of the People's Republic of China
- Taiwan passport
- Resident Identity Card, the national identification card for Chinese citizens.
- Visa requirements for Chinese citizens
- People's Republic of China Marriage Certificate
