= New Marriage Law =

Law of China regarding marriage

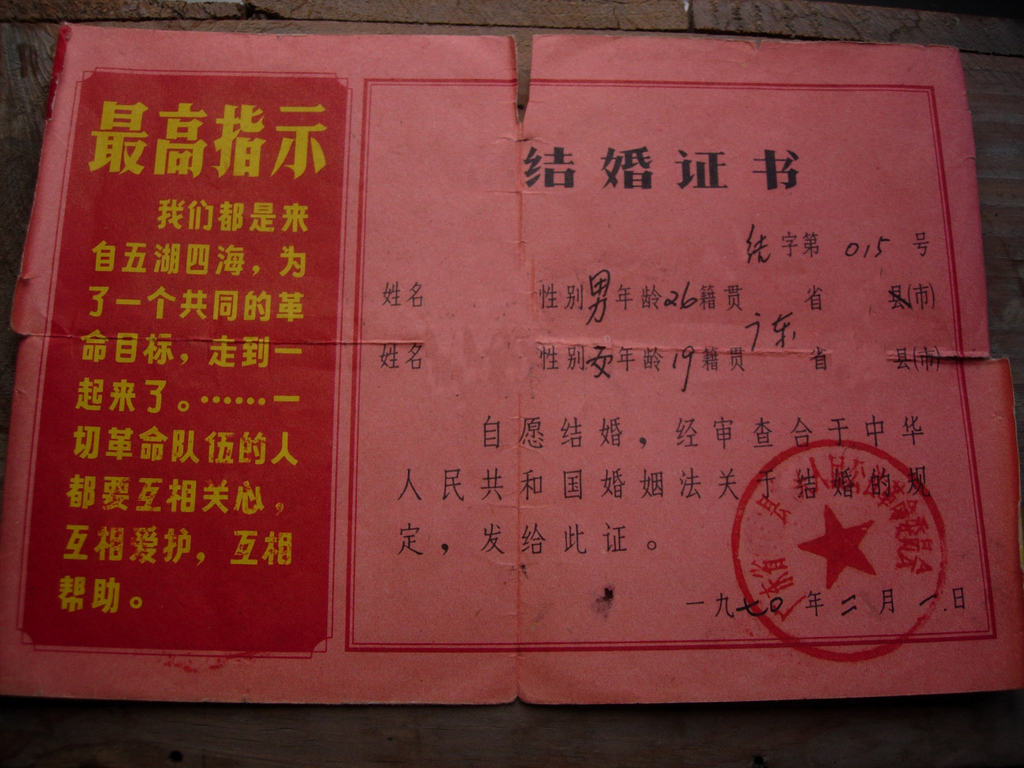
A marriage certificate issued in 1970. The certificate stressed the couple were "marrying voluntarily" and in accordance to the New Marriage Law; a piece of Mao Zedong's quotation was stated to the left of the certificate.

The New Marriage Law (also First Marriage Law, Chinese: 新婚姻法; pinyin: Xīn Hūnyīn Fǎ) was a civil marriage law passed in the People's Republic of China on May 1, 1950. It was a radical change from existing patriarchal Chinese marriage customs, and needed constant support from propaganda campaigns. It has since been superseded by the Second Marriage Law of 1980. It was formally repealed by the Civil Code in 2021.

== Origins ==
Marriage reform was one of the first priorities of the People's Republic of China when it was established in 1949. Women's rights were a personal interest of Mao Zedong (as indicated by his statement: "Women hold up half the sky"), and had been a concern of Chinese intellectuals since the New Culture Movement in the 1910s and 1920s. Traditionally, Chinese marriage had often been arranged or forced, concubinage was commonplace, and women could not seek a divorce.

== Implementation ==
The New Marriage Law was enacted in May 1950, delivered by Mao Zedong himself. It provided a civil registry for legal marriages, raised the marriageable age to 20 for males and 18 for females, and banned marriage by proxy; both parties had to consent to a marriage. It immediately became an essential part of land reform, as women in rural communities stopped being sold to landlords.

The New Marriage Law sought to replace the traditional practice with free-choice marriage based on equal rights for women. It sought to abolish practices deemed as feudal abuses like bigamy, arranged marriages, concubinage, infanticide, interfering with a widow's choice to re-marry, and the practice of taking in a foster daughter-in-law for future marriage to a son (童养媳 tongyangxi). The official slogan was: "Men and women are equal; everyone is worth his (or her) salt."

The New Marriage Law set minimum ages to marry (age 20 for men and age 18 for women). It encouraged women to use their own family names. The law provided women the right to initiate divorce proceedings stated that women could own land in their own right, regardless of whether they were single, married, widowed, or divorced.

Following the passage of the 1950 Marriage Law, mass campaigns promoted the principle of freely-chosen monogamous marriages and official registration of marriage. Efforts by the All-China Women's Federation resulted in a nation-wide campaign to promote the law via public rallies, street corner meetings, and a variety of media including radio, exhibitions at cultural stations, film, and newspaper articles. As a result of yearly propaganda campaigns from 1950 to 1955 to popularize the law, more than 90% of marriages in China were registered, and thereby were considered to be compliant with the New Marriage Law. Nonetheless, Women's Federation reports indicated instances of violence when women attempted to exercise the rights to divorce granted to them by the law: The Shaanxi Women's Federation, for example, counted 195 instances of death related to marriage cases by the end of 1950 in that province. As a method of implementation, the Women's Federation promoted and organized "Marriage Law Month" in 1953, as an attempt to dampen the conflict which followed the law's passing. Songs and operas were performed, to show the downfall of the "old ways".

Female infanticide declined drastically following the Marriage Law.

== Effect on marriage registration ==
The New Marriage Law that was established also had a new effect on the registration system that existed in China. Under the new law, the system allowed officials to reject marriages that were found to be forced, such as human trafficking, children and infants, and those forced by patriarchs. The couple who married would be the only authorized party to register. The system would help build a new expectation for Marriages, by allowing citizens to play a role in setting healthy standards and helping to build a new society that would be very different from the past.

== Second Marriage Law ==
The New Marriage Law was updated in 1980 by the Second Marriage Law, or Revised Marriage Law (RML), which liberalized divorce, bolstered the one-child policy, and instructed the courts to favor the interests of women and children in property distribution in divorce. The law was revised and led by Chinese politician Kang Keqing after a large amount of conflict surrounding the first law. It was changed two years after Keqing's involvement.

Key changes included:

- Domestic violence – Changes from traditional norms where outside interference was not permitted. Now law enforcement will and can be involved in order to sue for money or justice.
- Abandonment – With many members of families moving away for work, most do not return to care for their family. The Revised Marriage Law expands on who cares for the needy family member from just parents and children to three generations of family. A clause is stated that government help is only offered if no other option is available.
- Divorce – More possible reasons can result in a divorce, formally decided by a judge or a leader of a work unit. Now reasons for divorce can include domestic violence, addictions from drugs, gambling, cheating, or bigamy.
- The age of a woman to get married was set to 20. As for a male, the legal age is 22.
- All marriages that are under the rules of polygamy were considered to be illegal. However, the marriages that were intact before the new law were able to stay intact.
- All marriages that were considered to be medically unfit were not allowed. These situations include a person that was unfit to care for themselves. For example, leprosy is included in this law.
- A marriage will become legally official when the court approves it, and no marriage ceremony is required.
- Now the choice for the husband to join the wife's family is an option, as is the wife joining the husband's. This sub-law is set to promote the equality between male and female children.

Article 28 of the 1980 Marriage Law also formalizes duties from younger generations to older, and from older generations to younger:

Grandparents or maternal grandparents who can afford it shall have the duty to bring up their grandchildren who are minors and whose parents are dead or have no capacity of bringing them up. Grandchildren or maternal grandchildren who can afford it shall have the duty to support their grandparents or maternal grandparents whose children are dead or have no means to support them.

The let-out clauses in the law ("who can afford it") are applied generously. By applying equally to "grandparents or maternal grandparents," the law also formalizes the rejection of the traditional preference for the paternal grandmother. That traditional cultural preference had disintegrated following the Communist success in the Chinese civil war.

Further updates in 1983 formalized the legal procedure for marriages between Chinese citizens and foreign nationals. The Second Marriage Law was also amended in 2001 to outlaw married persons' cohabitation with a third party, aimed at curbing a resurgence of concubinage in big cities.

== See also ==
- All-China Women's Federation
- Globalization and women in China
- Women in the People's Republic of China
- People's Republic of China Marriage Certificate
