= People's Republic of China Marriage Certificate =

Chinese government document

People's Republic of China Marriage Certificate (Chinese: 中华人民共和国结婚证) is a legal document issued by the Chinese Marriage Registration Authority to prove the valid establishment of a marriage. Two copies are issued, one for each party of the marriage.

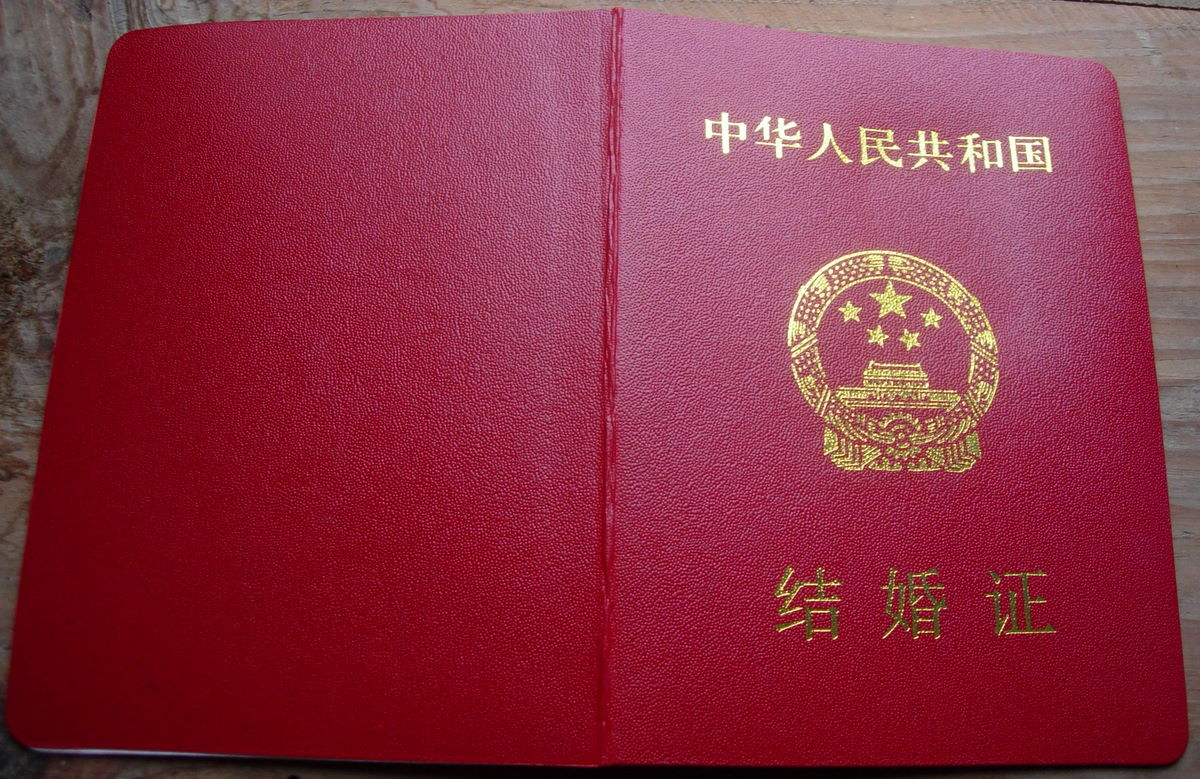
People's Republic of China Marriage Certificate

== Appearance ==
The format of the marriage certificate is uniformly formulated by the Ministry of Civil Affairs. The marriage certificate must be affixed with a photo of both parties of the marriage, and validated by a stamp for marriage registration. It also contains the couple's names and identity information. The certificate is about the size of a palm, and the cover is maroon.

== History ==
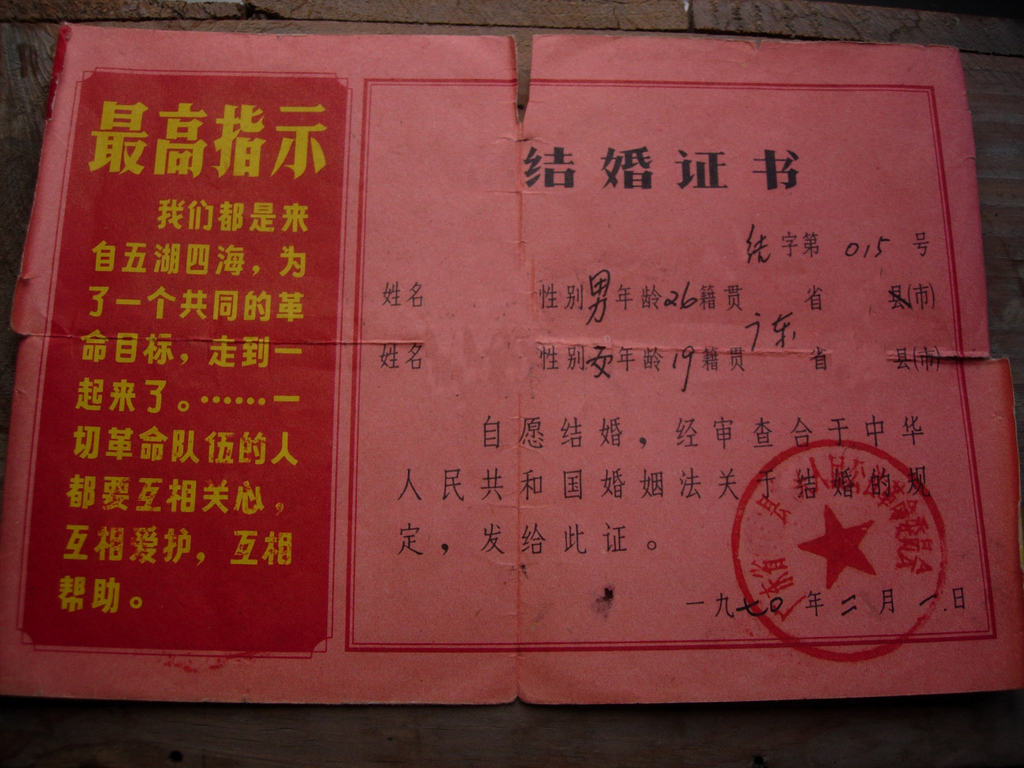
Marriage certificate issued by a county in Guangdong province in the 1970s

=== Before 1980 ===
The practice of issuing official marriage certificates in China originated in the Qing Dynasty. The newlywed couples would collect their certificate from the county Yamen. The certificate included the names and ages of the couple, as well as names of the officiant and the matchmaker. The official seal is stamped to legitimize the marriage.

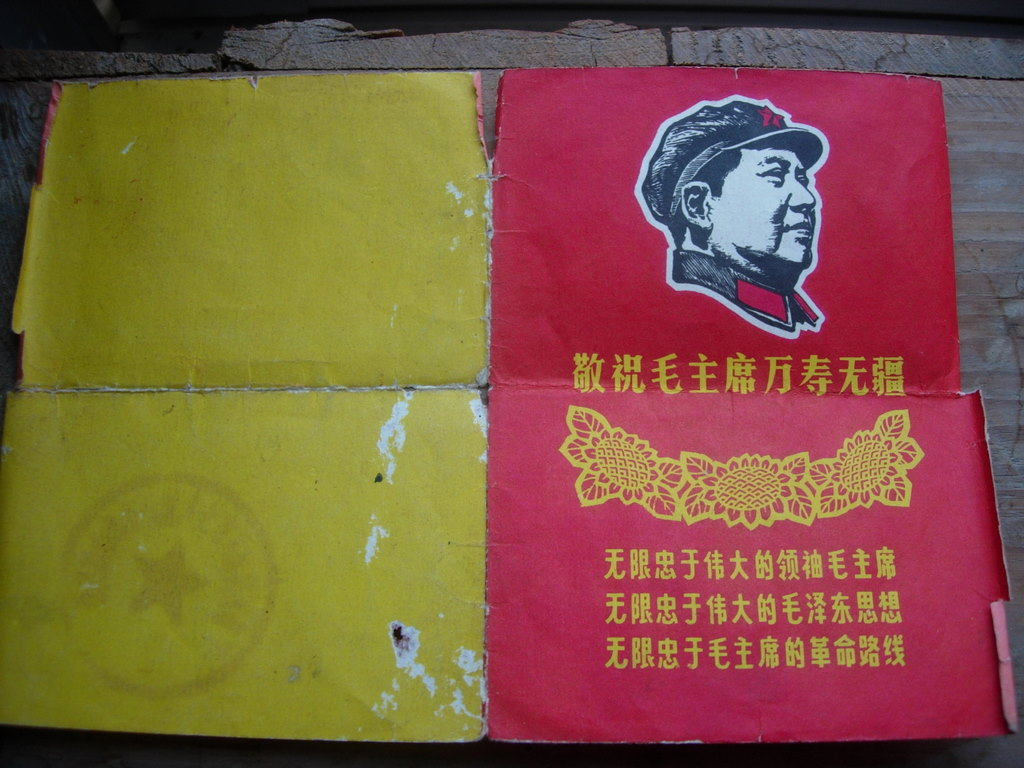
Cover page of the marriage certificate showed in the picture above

The Marriage Law of the People's Republic of China was implemented on May 1, 1950. Among them, Article 6 stipulates: "Both parties to the marriage should go to the local (district, township) people's government to register in person. For marriages that comply with the provisions of this law, the local people's government shall immediately issue a marriage certificate. Any marriage not in conformity with the provisions of this law shall not be registered." and "After divorce, if both parties voluntarily restore the marital relationship, they should register with the district people's government for restoration of marriage. The district people's government shall register and issue a resumed marriage certificate."

After the promulgation of the "Marriage Registration Measures" in 1955, marriage certificates were printed by county and municipal governments independently. Their forms and specifications varied greatly, lacking a unified standard, and most adopted the style of a certificate of merit. From the 1950s to the 1970s, the decorative patterns on marriage certificates included traditional auspicious patterns such as mandarin ducks playing in the water and plum blossoms, as well as new patterns such as rice ears, cotton, and doves of peace. Slogans are often printed on marriage certificates, such as "Marriage is voluntary" in the 1950s, "diligence and thrift, family planning" in the 1970s and 1980s. During the Cultural Revolution, they frequently featured Chairman Mao's portrait or quotations.

=== 1980 to 1986 ===
On November 11, 1980, the Ministry of Civil Affairs of the People's Republic of China officially issued and implemented the new "Marriage Registration Measures". Under the new "Marriage Registration Measures," the responsibility for printing marriage certificates has been centralized to the provincial, autonomous regional levels, ensuring a higher degree of standardization in their format.

With the reform and opening up, marriage certificates have taken on a more formal legal character, resembling passports in their appearance.

=== 1986 to 1994 ===
On March 15, 1986, a new "Marriage Registration Measures" issued by the Ministry of Civil Affairs replaced the last one. Therefore, since 1986, the Ministry of Civil Affairs standardized the format of marriage certificates, while the printing was decentralized to provincial and municipal authorities.

=== 1994 to 2003 ===
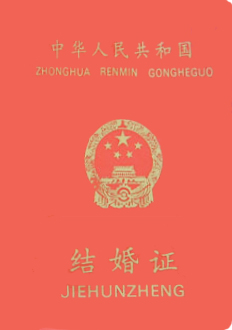
1994 version of the marriage certificate of the People's Republic of China

The "Marriage Registration Management Regulations" were promulgated and came into effect on February 1, 1994, replacing the "Marriage Registration Measures" which had been in force since March 1986.

Starting in 1994, China implemented a standardized marriage certificate design under the supervision of the Ministry of Civil Affairs. The new certificate resembled a passport with a red cover and gold lettering.

=== Since 2003 ===
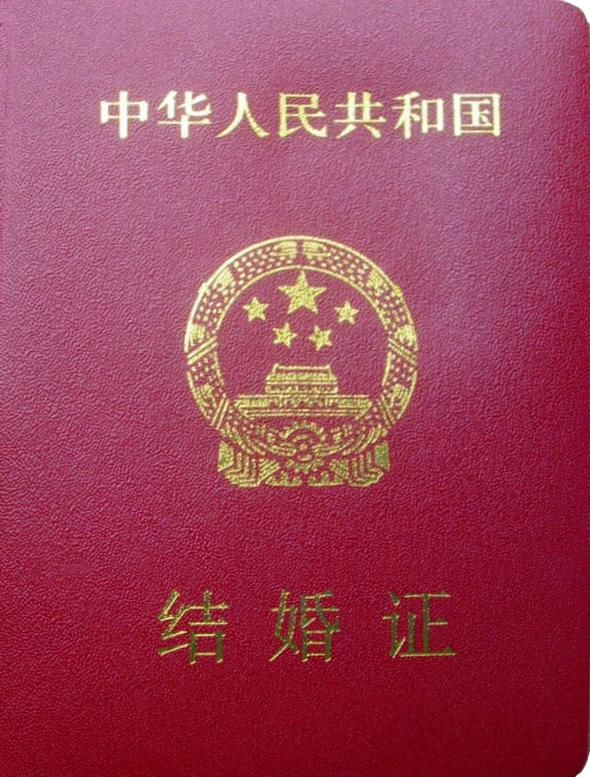
2004 version of the Chinese marriage certificate.

Starting from October 1, 2003, the new "Marriage Registration Regulations" came into effect, replacing the "Marriage Registration Management Regulations" that had been in force since 1994.

On July 1, 2004, China introduced a new version of the marriage certificate. Both the new marriage certificate and divorce certificate have maroon covers, marking a change from the previous design where marriage certificates had red covers and divorce certificates had green covers since 1994. The marriage certificate cover has gold lettering, while the divorce certificate cover has silver lettering. Both certificates are supervised by the Ministry of Civil Affairs.

The certificate incorporates a peony flower pattern and utilizes advanced banknote printing technology to significantly enhance its security features and prevent counterfeiting.

After 2004, the Ministry of Civil Affairs undertook a project to connect all marriage registration systems across the country. In early 2010, pilot marriage registration networking was started in Sichuan and Shaanxi provinces. In June 2010, Shandong Province uniformly adopted the new version of certificate and upgraded the registration system throughout the province, the marriage registration network in Shandong Province launched in September of the same year.

Starting from September 2018, married couples residing in Jiangsu can obtain a digital equivalent of their physical marriage certificate through the "Jiangsu Government" mini-program on Alipay with just a facial scan. Starting from August 2019, this service has been extended to Fujian, Jiangxi, Zhejiang, and Chongqing.

== Registration requirements ==
Statutory conditions for obtaining a marriage certificate: Both parties are voluntary, have no spouse, the male is over 22 years old and the female is over 20 years old, both parties are not lineal blood relatives, not collateral blood relatives within the third generation, and there is no disease that medically believes should not be married.

The Chinese "Marriage Law" advocates the freedom of marriage, but with the following conditions. According to China's laws and regulations, at least the following types of individuals are not eligible for marriage:

(1) A person who has been married to a third party, and the marriage has not been terminated. When such a person gets married, he commits the crime of bigamy.

(2) Those who are below the age of marriage: men are earlier than 22 years old, and women are earlier than 20 years old.

(3) Suffering from a physical defect that prevents marriage. Marriage is prohibited for persons who have not been cured of leprosy or who suffer from other diseases that are medically considered inappropriate for marriage.

(4) It is also not allowed to marry relatives who have direct blood relatives and collateral blood relatives within three generations, which is usually referred to as consanguineous marriage. This violates the principle of eugenics advocated by our country.

(5) It does not mean that people who are incapacitated cannot get married, but it must be explained to the other party in advance. If you conceal this situation and marry the other party, which leads to a breakdown of the relationship between the husband and wife, one party requests a divorce, and the divorce shall be granted.

== Process ==
Both men and women comply with the provisions of the Marriage Law, and the procedures for obtaining a marriage certificate can be divided into three steps: application, review and registration:

(1) Application. Both men and women who want to get married must hold their household registration certificate, resident ID card, and a signed statement that they have no spouse and no direct blood relatives or collateral blood relatives within three generations of the other party. Apply for marriage registration at the marriage registration office where one party's household registration is located. Both men and women must be present when applying for registration. If you are divorced, you should also hold a divorce certificate. In the place where prenuptial examination is carried out, the certificate of prenuptial examination from the hospital should also be held.

(2) Review. The registration authority may, when necessary, require the parties to provide relevant certification materials, conduct necessary investigations, or designate items for medical identification when examining the marriage applications of both parties.

(3) Registration. After examination, the marriage registration authority shall approve the registration and issue a marriage certificate if it considers that the marriage conditions are met. If the marriage registration authority refuses to register, it shall issue a written statement explaining the reasons for the refusal.

== See also ==
- New Marriage Law
- Marriage in modern China
- Traditional Chinese marriage
