= Visa requirements for Chinese citizens (disambiguation) =

Visa requirements for Chinese citizens usually refers to visa requirements for mainland Chinese residents holding ordinary Chinese passport.

For residents of Hong Kong and Macau special administrative regions (SARs) of Chinese nationality:

- Visa requirements for Chinese citizens of Hong Kong, visa requirements for Chinese citizens who are permanent residents of Hong Kong and hold Hong Kong SAR passports
- Visa requirements for Chinese citizens of Macau, visa requirements for Chinese citizens who are permanent residents of Macau and hold Macau SAR passports

For residents of Taiwan:

- Visa requirements for Taiwanese citizens, visa requirements for Taiwan passport (issued by Republic of China) holders
