= Visa requirements for Chinese citizens of Hong Kong =

Administrative entry restrictions

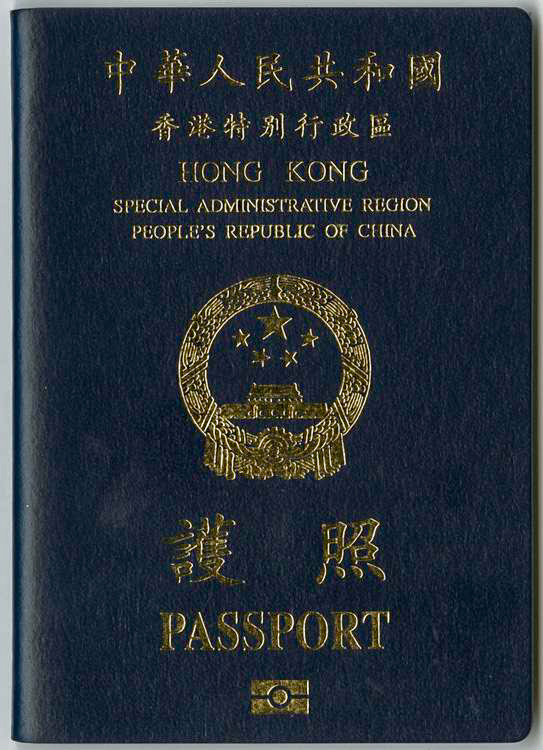
Cover of the latest version of an HKSAR biometric passport

As of 2026, Hong Kong Special Administrative Region passport holders have visa-free or visa on arrival access to 175 countries and territories, ranking the passport 12th in the world according to the Henley Passport Index. It is ranked 11th by the Global Passport Power Rank.

The official figure provided by the Hong Kong Immigration Department of countries and territories granting visa-free access to Hong Kong SAR passport holders was 178 as of 26 August 2026. (However, this figure excludes countries and territories which are not officially recognised by the People's Republic of China, such as Kosovo (visa free for up to 90 days within any 6-month period), Taiwan (de facto e-Visa) and Somaliland (visa required), territories deemed to be under Chinese rule, such as Mainland China (The Mainland Travel Permit for Hong Kong and Macao Resident) and Macao (visa free for up to 1 year), as well as UN observer states, such as Palestine (no additional visa condition than that of Israel's, ETA-IL grants visa free access for up to 90 days) and Vatican City (no additional visa condition than that of the Schengen Area)

Due to the one country, two systems policy, the Government of Hong Kong can make a visa-waiver agreement for Chinese residents of Hong Kong with other countries. As a result of both bilateral visa abolition agreements (e.g. between Hong Kong and Russia) and unilateral decisions to grant visa exemptions (e.g. Myanmar), HKSAR passport holders enjoy visa exemptions and simplified visa procedures to a large number of destinations worldwide. Whilst the visa exemptions are mostly only for short trips for pleasure or on business, a number of countries extend the visa exemption to short stays involving paid activities (e.g. Belgium and Luxembourg).

HKSAR passports are available to Chinese citizens who are also permanent residents of Hong Kong and hold a valid Hong Kong Permanent Identity Card.

== Visa requirements map ==
Visa requirements for Chinese citizens of Hong Kong holding ordinary passports Hong Kong Mainland Travel Permit travel Visa not required / ETA Visa on arrival or eVisa eVisa Visa required

== Greater China ==
Jurisdiction	Visa requirement	Allowed stay	Notes
China	Freedom of movement with Mainland Travel Permit or Chinese Travel Document only, HKSAR passport is only suitable for transit in Mainland China	Unlimited (discretionary)	Entry to mainland China cannot be on a HKSAR passport. However, all eligible for a HKSAR passport are also eligible to apply for a separate Mainland Travel Permit for Hong Kong and Macao Residents, otherwise and previously known as a Home Return Permit, or a Chinese Travel Document if the HKSAR passport holder does not reside in Greater China and is not in possession of a current MTP, allowing the holder to enter and stay in mainland China for indefinite period until its expiry for any purpose. Issuance of the MTP, however, is not guaranteed for all Chinese citizens of Hong Kong and is at the sole discretion of the National Immigration Administration of the Ministry of Public Security of China.
Macao	Visa not required	1 year (HKPIC or Re-entry Permit) 7 days (Passport)	Visa free for holders of Hong Kong Permanent Identity Cards for a stay of less than one year. Visa not required for 7 days for passengers in transit holding HKSAR passports.
Taiwan	eVisa (Online Entry Permit)	30 days	One of the below must apply to the applicant: Born in Hong Kong/Macao; Not born in Hong Kong/Macao but has travelled to Taiwan as a permanent resident of Hong Kong or Macao after 1983; Bearer of a valid Entry and Exit Permit; Permit is good for one entry to Taiwan within 3 months of the successful application. Confirmation letter must be printed and presented to Taiwan authorities upon arrival. Free of charge.
Taiwan	Single-entry eVisa (Entry and Exit Permit)	3 months	Applicant must not have any passports other than the Hong Kong passport, the Macao passport or the British National (Overseas) passport. Issuance of the permit is not guaranteed for all Hong Kong citizens and is determined on a case-by-case basis. Additionally, an applicant born in mainland China must prove the renunciation of mainland Chinese household registration by providing one the following documents: Non-Household Registration Declaration; Mainland Travel Permit for Hong Kong and Macao Residents; Certificate of Renunciation of Mainland Household Registration; Fee: NT$600
Taiwan	Multiple-entry eVisa (Entry and Exit Permit)	3 months	Applicant must not have any passports other than the Hong Kong passport, the Macao passport or the British National (Overseas) passport. Additionally, if the applicant was born in the Chinese mainland, he/she must prove renunciation of mainland Chinese household registration by providing one the following documents: Non-Household Registration Declaration; Mainland Travel Permit for Hong Kong and Macao Residents; Certificate of Renunciation of Mainland Household Registration; Fee: NT$1000 (1 year) NT$2000 (3 years)
Taiwan	Visa on arrival	30 days	One of the below must apply to the applicant: Born in Hong Kong/Macao; Not born in Hong Kong/Macao but has travelled to Taiwan as a permanent resident of Hong Kong or Macao after 1983; Bearer of a valid Entry and Exit Permit; Passport must be valid for 3 months or above, with proof of return ticket for within 30 days of arrival. Fee: NT$300
Taiwan	Not eligible for Hong Kong/Macau residents entry scheme	Must travel using third-country passport	Applicant who has passports other than the Hong Kong passport, the Macao passport or the British National (Overseas) passport. Must enter using a third-country passport and meet the entry requirements applicable to that nationality, unless proof of renunciation of the third-country nationality is provided.

== Visa requirements ==
Visa requirements for holders of normal passports traveling for tourist purposes:

Country	Visa requirement	Allowed stay	Notes (excluding departure fees)
Afghanistan	eVisa		The Government of Hong Kong advises its citizens not to travel to Afghanistan due to the volatile situation in the country.; Visa is not required in case born in Afghanistan or can proof that one of their parents is a national of Afghanistan or born in Afghanistan.; e-Visa : Visitors must arrive at Kabul International (KBL).
Albania	Visa not required	90 days	Permanent ID Card valid in lieu of valid passport. Maximum stay of 90 days within any 180 days periods.
Algeria	Visa not required	14 days	
Andorra	Visa not required		
Angola	Visa not required	30 days	
Antigua and Barbuda	Visa not required	30 days	
Argentina	Visa not required	90 days	
Armenia	Visa not required	180 days	
Australia	Electronic Travel Authority	90 days	90 days on each visit in 12-month period if granted.; Starting from 21 August 2020, Hong Kong passport holders are eligible for applying 5 years student and temporary skilled visas after the enforcement of the national security law. After meeting the requirement of the 5 years stay, eligible visa holders can apply for permanent residence in the same manner like other nationalities.
Austria	Visa not required	90 days	90 days within any 180 day period in the Schengen Area.
Azerbaijan	Visa not required	30 days	From 2 February 2026 to 2 February 2027, Hong Kong passport holders can travel to Azerbaijan three times in a year without a visa and stay for up to 30 days at each entrance.
Bahamas	Visa not required	3 months	
Bahrain	eVisa / Visa on arrival	14 days	
Bangladesh	Visa on arrival	30 days	
Barbados	Visa not required	90 days	
Belarus	Visa not required	30 days	
Belgium	Visa not required	90 days	90 days within any 180 day period in the Schengen Area.
Belize	Visa not required		
Benin	Visa not required	14 days	Must have an international vaccination certificate.
Bhutan	eVisa	90 days	
Bolivia	Online Visa	30 days	Visitors must complete an online application form, but still need to visit an embassy in order to receive a sticker visa.; Dual nationality is recognized by Bolivia; however, this status must first be approved by Bolivian Immigration. Passengers holding dual nationality should ensure that they arrive and depart Bolivia on the same document, even when the other document may enjoy visa-exemption status.
Bosnia and Herzegovina	Visa not required	90 days	90 days within any 6-month period.
Botswana	Visa not required	90 days	90 days within any year period.
Brazil	Visa not required	90 days	
Brunei	Visa not required	14 days	
Bulgaria	Visa not required	90 days	90 days within any 180 day period in the Schengen Area.
Burkina Faso	Visa not required	14 days	
Burundi	Visa free / eVisa / Visa on arrival	14 days	
Cambodia	Visa free	14 days	From 15 June 2026 to 15 October 2026, Hong Kong passport holders can travel to Cambodia without a visa and stay for up to 14 days at each entrance.
Cameroon	eVisa		Your chosen embassy will examine your file and make a decision. If the file is accepted, there are two options: The visa is granted at our embassy. Such applicants will receive an electronic message for an appointment. The Applicant(s) must bring the original documents used in the pre-enrolment together with the passport, which mush have at least a minimum of 6 months validity. The visa will be affixed inside your passport.; An electronic authorization with a QR code will be provided to collect electronic parameters of those who cannot come to the embassy. Such people would be able to travel to Cameroon with a printed authorization. They will also have to bring along the original documents used for the pre-enrolment. Their parameters will be collected at the entry check point into Cameroon e.g. Airport or Sea port or any border post, and a six- month validity visa will be stamped into your passport.
Canada	Visa not required	6 months	Starting from 2021, Canada rolled out a new scheme for Hong Kong residents migrating to the country after the enforcement of the national security law. 3 years work permits will be available for those who were graduated from either a recognised Canadian or overseas post-secondary institution in the last ten years. In addition, two streams for permanent residency were provided – (1) persons who have graduated from a post-secondary designated learning institution in Canada. (2) persons who have worked in Canada for at least 12 months full time, or an equal amount of part-time hours. If approved, their spouse or partner as well as children can also apply to come with them. Applicants will be eligible for applying Canadian Permanent residency in Canada.; eTA required if arriving by air.
Cape Verde	Visa not required	90 days	Online registration called EASE required, otherwise there is additional charge on arrival. It is advised to fill the form 3 days before arrival.
Central African Republic	eVisa		E-visa portal:https://evisa-centrafrique.com/
Chad	Visa not required	90 days	
Chile	Visa not required	90 days	
Colombia	Visa not required	90 days	
Comoros	Visa on arrival	45 days	
Republic of the Congo	Visa required		
Democratic Republic of the Congo	eVisa	7 days	
Costa Rica	Visa not required	180 days	
Côte d'Ivoire	eVisa	3 months	Get Visa at Félix-Houphouët-Boigny International Airport in Abidjan.
Croatia	Visa not required	90 days	90 days within any 180 day period in the Schengen Area
Cuba	eVisa	90 days	
Cyprus	Visa not required	90 days	90 days within any 180 day period.
Czech Republic	Visa not required	90 days	90 days within any 180 day period in the Schengen Area.
Denmark	Visa not required	90 days	90 days within any 180 day period in the Schengen Area.
Djibouti	Visa not required/eVisa or Visa on arrival	14 days/31 days	
Dominica	Visa not required	6 months	
Dominican Republic	Visa not required	90 days	
Ecuador	Visa not required	90 days	
Egypt	Visa not required	3 months	
El Salvador	eVisa		No visa required if holding valid visa of US, Canada, or Schengen Member State.
Equatorial Guinea	eVisa		
Eritrea	Visa required		
Estonia	Visa not required	90 days	90 days within any 180 day period in the Schengen Area.
Eswatini	Visa required		
Ethiopia	eVisa / Visa on arrival	up to 90 days	Visa on arrival is obtainable only at Addis Ababa Bole International Airport.; e-Visa holders must arrive via Addis Ababa Bole International Airport.; e-Visa is available for 30 or 90 days.; The Government of Hong Kong advises its citizens not to travel to Ethiopia due to the security situation in the country.
Fiji	Visa not required	4 months	
Finland	Visa not required	90 days	90 days within any 180 day period in the Schengen Area.
France and territories	Visa not required	90 days	90 days within any 180 day period in the Schengen Area.
Gabon	eVisa	90 days	e-Visa holders must arrive via Libreville International Airport.
Gambia	Visa required		In addition to a visa, an entry clearance must be obtained from the Gambian Immigration prior to travel.
Georgia	Visa not required	30 days	
Germany	Visa not required	90 days	90 days within any 180 day period in the Schengen Area.; Hong Kong citizens can apply for automatic customs clearance upon entry.
Ghana	eVisa		
Greece	Visa not required	90 days	90 days within any 180 day period in the Schengen Area.
Grenada	Visa not required	3 months	
Guatemala	Visa required		
Guinea	eVisa	90 days	
Guinea-Bissau	Visa on arrival	90 days	
Guyana	Visa not required	90 days	
Haiti	Visa not required	3 months	
Honduras	Visa required		No visa required if holding valid visa of US, Canada, or Schengen Member State.
Hungary	Visa not required	90 days	90 days within any 180 day period in the Schengen Area.
Iceland	Visa not required	90 days	90 days within any 180 day period in the Schengen Area.
India	Visa required		Except for business purposes.
Indonesia	Visa not required	30 days	
Iran	Visa not required	21 days	The Government of Hong Kong advises its citizens not to travel to Iran due to the volatile security situation in the country.
Iraq	eVisa		The Government of Hong Kong advises its citizens not to travel to Iraq due to the volatile situation in the country.
Ireland	Visa not required	90 days	
Israel	Visa not required	90 days	The Government of Hong Kong advises its citizens not to travel to Israel due to the security situation in the country.
Italy	Visa not required	90 days	90 days within any 180 day period in the Schengen Area; Hong Kong citizens can apply for automatic customs clearance upon entry.
Jamaica	Visa not required	30 days	
Japan	Visa not required	90 days	
Jordan	Visa not required	14 days	Not available at all entry points.; e-Visas are available for longer stays.
Kazakhstan	Visa not required	14 days	
Kenya	Electronic Travel Authorization	90 days	Applications can be submitted up to 90 days prior to travel and must be submitted at least 3 days in advance.; eTA fee is 32.50 USD.; Proof of reservation at the hotel where visitors plan to stay is required (if staying with friends, an invitation letter is also acceptable).; Yellow fever vaccination certificate is required if coming from endemic countries.
Kiribati	Visa not required	1 month	
North Korea	Visa required		
South Korea	Visa not required	90 days	HKSAR passport has right to get E-ETA free till 31 December 2026. The government of the Republic of Korea announced that from 1 April 2023, to 31 December 2026, a K-ETA is not required for 27 countries citizens visiting Korea for 90 days or less for business or tourism.; Chinese citizens of Hong Kong can enter South Korea as a short term visit (e.g., tours, visiting relatives or friends, attending simple meetings) up to 90 days without a visa. You must have an onward or return ticket. It is illegal to work on a tourist visa, whether as a teacher or in any other capacity.; You must be in possession of a Korea Electronic Travel Authorization (K-ETA) to enter Korea visa-free. You can complete your K-ETA application up to 24 hours before boarding your flight and it will be valid for 3 years from the date of approval. There is a small, non-refundable charge.
Kuwait	eVisa / Visa on arrival	3 months	
Kyrgyzstan	Visa not required	30 days	e-Visa holders must arrive via Manas International Airport or Osh Airport or through land crossings with China (at Irkeshtam and Torugart), Kazakhstan (at Ak-jol, Ak-Tilek, Chaldybar, Chon-Kapka), Tajikistan (at Bor-Dobo, Kulundu, Kyzyl-Bel) and Uzbekistan (at Dostuk).; According to the information provided by of the Government of the Kyrgyz Republic (Kyrgyzstan), HKSAR passport holders may visit Kyrgyzstan visa-free for a stay of up to 30 days entering through Manas International Airport in Bishkek with a return air ticket and re-enter after 30 days from the date of departure from Kyrgyzstan.
Laos	Visa not required	14 days	
Latvia	Visa not required	90 days	90 days within any 180 day period in the Schengen Area.
Lebanon	Free visa on arrival	1 month	1 month extendable for 2 additional months.; Granted free of charge at Beirut International Airport or any other port of entry if there is no Israeli visa or seal, holding a telephone number, an address in Lebanon, and a non refundable return or circle trip ticket.; The Government of Hong Kong advises its citizens not to travel to Lebanon due to the volatile security situation in the country.
Lesotho	Visa not required	90 days	
Liberia	eVisa		e-Visa available for Hong Kong SAR passport holders. British National (Overseas) Passport holders still required to obtain a visa from Liberian diplomatic missions
Libya	eVisa		
Liechtenstein	Visa not required	90 days	90 days within any 180 day period in the Schengen Area.
Lithuania	Visa not required	90 days	90 days within any 180 day period in the Schengen Area.
Luxembourg	Visa not required	90 days	90 days within any 180 day period in the Schengen Area.
Madagascar	Visa not required/Visa on arrival	15 days/90 days	
Malawi	Visa not required	90 days	
Malaysia	Visa not required	90 days	
Maldives	Free visa on arrival	30 days	
Mali	Visa not required	90 days	
Malta	Visa not required	90 days	90 days within any 180 day period in the Schengen Area.
Marshall Islands	Visa required		
Mauritania	eVisa	30 days	
Mauritius	Visa not required	180 days	
Mexico	Visa not required	90 days	
Micronesia	Visa not required	30 days	
Moldova	Visa not required	90 days	90 days within any 180 day period.
Monaco	Visa not required		
Mongolia	Visa not required	14 days	
Montenegro	Visa not required	90 days	
Morocco	Visa not required	30 days	
Mozambique	Visa not required / Visa on arrival or eVisa	30 days	
Myanmar	Visa on arrival	30 days	From 11 March 2026 to 10 March 2027, nationals of Hong Kong may obtain a tourist visa upon arrival at any international airport in Myanmar, for a fee of 50 USD.
Namibia	Visa not required	3 months	
Nauru	Visa required		
Nepal	eVisa / Free Visa on arrival	90 days	
Netherlands	Visa not required	90 days	90 days within any 180 day period in the Schengen Area.; Hong Kong citizens can apply for automatic customs clearance upon entry.
New Zealand	Visa not required	3 months	International Visitor Conservation and Tourism Levy must be paid upon requesting an Electronic Travel Authority.; Holders of an Australian Permanent Resident Visa or Resident Return Visa may be granted a New Zealand Resident Visa on arrival permitting indefinite stay (pursuant to the Trans-Tasman Travel Arrangement), subject to meeting character requirements and obtaining an Electronic Travel Authority prior to departure. Such travellers are not required to pay the International Visitor Conservation and Tourism Levy.
Nicaragua	Visa not required	90 days	
Niger	Visa not required	14 days	
Nigeria	eVisa	90 days	
North Macedonia	Visa not required	90 days	
Norway	Visa not required	90 days	90 days within any 180 day period in the Schengen Area.
Oman	Visa not required	14 days	eVisa also available validity up to 30 days
Pakistan	eVisa		* Tourist visa cost $8.18 for any type of duration listed
Palau	Free visa on arrival	30 days	
Panama	Visa not required	30 days	
Papua New Guinea	eVisa	60 days	
Paraguay	Visa required		
Peru	Visa not required	183 days	
Philippines	Visa not required	14 days	
Poland	Visa not required	90 days	90 days regardless of time spent in other Schengen countries.
Portugal	Visa not required	90 days	90 days within any 180 day period in the Schengen Area.
Qatar	Visa not required	30 days	
Romania	Visa not required	90 days	90 days within any 180 day period in the Schengen Area.
Russia	Visa not required	14 days	For a maximum total stay of 90 days within one calendar year period
Rwanda	Visa not required/eVisa or Visa on arrival	30 days	
Saint Kitts and Nevis	Visa not required	3 months	
Saint Lucia	Visa not required	42 days	
Saint Vincent and the Grenadines	Visa not required	3 months	
Samoa	Visa not required	90 days	
San Marino	Visa not required	90 days	
São Tomé and Príncipe	Visa not required	15 days	
Saudi Arabia	eVisa / Visa on arrival	90 days	
Senegal	Visa on arrival	30 days	
Serbia	Visa not required	14 days	
Seychelles	Electronic Border System	3 months	Application can be submitted up to 30 days before travel.; Visitors must upload a reservation confirmation(s) for each visitor's location of stay in Seychelles.; Yellow fever vaccination certificate is required if coming from endemic countries.; Payment of the fee (EUR 10) by credit or debit card.; Valid for one journey only and it expires once exit the country.
Sierra Leone	Visa on arrival	30 days	
Singapore	Visa not required	30 days	
Slovakia	Visa not required	90 days	90 days within any 180 day period in the Schengen Area.
Slovenia	Visa not required	90 days	90 days within any 180 day period in the Schengen Area.
Solomon Islands	Visa not required	30 days	
Somalia	eVisa	30 days	All visitors must have an approved Electronic Visa (eTAS) before the start of their journey.
South Africa	Visa not required	30 days	
South Sudan	eVisa		Obtainable online.; Printed visa authorization must be presented at the time of travel.
Spain	Visa not required	90 days	90 days within any 180 day period in the Schengen Area.
Sri Lanka	ETA/Visa on arrival		Sri Lanka introduced an ETA valid for 30 days.
Sudan	Visa required		The Government of Hong Kong advises its citizens not to travel to Sudan due to the volatile situation in the country.
Suriname	Visa not required	90 days	An entrance fee of USD 50 or EUR 50 must be paid online prior to arrival.; Multiple entry e-Visa is also available.
Sweden	Visa not required	90 days	90 days within any 180 day period in the Schengen Area.
Switzerland	Visa not required	90 days	90 days within any 180 day period in the Schengen Area.
Syria	eVisa		The Government of Hong Kong advises its citizens not to travel to Syria due to the volatile security situation in the country.
Tajikistan	eVisa	60 days	e-Visa holders can enter through all border points.
Tanzania	Visa not required	3 months	
Thailand	Visa not required	60 days	
Timor-Leste	Visa on arrival	30 days	A tourist visa costs US$30 and can normally be issued to the holder of a valid HKSAR passport on arrival at Dili International airport or Dili seaport, provided entry into Timor-Leste is regarded as being for a legitimate purpose. The visa will be valid for a single entry ONLY and will allow you to stay for up to 30 days.
Togo	eVisa	30 days	Passengers must have return tickets. They may apply to extend for another 90 days.
Tonga	Free visa on arrival	31 days	
Trinidad and Tobago	Visa not required		
Tunisia	Visa not required	90 days	
Turkey	Visa not required	3 months	
Turkmenistan	eVisa		A legislation has been passed by the Turkmenistan Parliament.
Tuvalu	Free visa on arrival	1 month	
Uganda	Visa not required	90 days	
Ukraine	Visa not required	14 days	The Government of Hong Kong advises its citizens not to travel to Ukraine due to the volatile situation in the country.
United Arab Emirates	Visa not required	30 days	
United Kingdom	Visa not required	6 months	Electronic Travel Authorisation must be obtained via the UK ETA app before travel for all visa exempt countries. British National (Overseas) are not required
United States	Visa required	Chinese citizens of Hong Kong who do receive a visa are normally issued with 10-years multiple-entry combination B1/B2 visas, and each entry can stay for a maximum of 6 months (the period of stay is subject to the border immigration officer); On 5 August 2021, President Joe Biden directed the Department of Homeland Security to implement a "deferral of removal" for up to 18 months for Hong Kong residents currently in the United States, in response to Beijing's implementation of the Hong Kong National Security Law. Eligible Hong Kongers can apply for a work permit. On 15 January 2025, the Biden administration extended the deferral of removal of Hong Kong residents who are present in the United States for another 24 months.	
Uruguay	Visa not required	3 months	
Uzbekistan	Visa not required	10 days	Must arrive by air. Otherwise an electronic visa is available.
Vanuatu	Visa not required	30 days	
Vatican City	Visa not required		
Venezuela	Visa not required	90 days	
Vietnam	eVisa	90 days	e-Visa is valid for 90 days and multiple entry.
Yemen	Visa not required	30 days	
Zambia	Visa not required	90 days	
Zimbabwe	Visa not required	6 months	

== Territories ==
Visa requirements for Chinese citizens of Hong Kong for visits to various territories, disputed areas, partially recognised countries and restricted zones:

Visitor to	Visa requirement	Notes (excluding departure fees)
Europe
Abkhazia	Visa required	
Mount Athos	Special permit required	Special permit required (4 days: 25 euro for Orthodox visitors, 35 euro for non-Orthodox visitors, 18 euro for students). There is a visitors' quota: maximum 100 Orthodox and 10 non-Orthodox per day and women are not allowed.
(Autonomous Republic of Crimea) Crimea	Visa not required	Visa issued by Russia is required, HK SAR Passport is exempted from a visa to enter Russia for 14 days.
Turkish Republic of Northern Cyprus	Visa not required	3 months
(United Nations) UN Buffer Zone in Cyprus	Access Permit required	Access Permit is required for travelling inside the zone, except Civil Use Areas.
Faroe Islands	Visa not required	
Gibraltar	Visa not required	
Guernsey	Visa not required	
Isle of Man	Visa not required	
(Norway) Jan Mayen	Permit required	Permit issued by the local police required for staying for less than 24 hours and permit issued by the Norwegian police for staying for more than 24 hours.
Jersey	Visa not required	
Kosovo	Visa not required	90 days
South Ossetia	Visa not required	Multiple entry visa to Russia and three-day prior notification are required to enter South Ossetia.
Transnistria	Visa not required	Migration card issued upon arrival.
Africa
British Indian Ocean Territory	Special permit required	Special permit required.
Eritrea outside Asmara	Travel permit required	To travel in the rest of the country, a Travel Permit for Foreigners is required (20 Eritrean nakfa).
Mayotte	Visa not required	90 days
Réunion	Visa not required	90 days
Ascension Island	Admission refused	From May 2015, the Ascension Island Government does not issue entry visas including eVisas to Chinese citizens of Hong Kong.
Saint Helena	Visitor's Pass required	Visitor's Pass granted on arrival valid for 4/10/21/60/90 days for 12/14/16/20/25 pound sterling.
Tristan da Cunha	Permission required	Permission to land required for 15/30 pounds sterling (yacht/ship passenger) for Tristan da Cunha Island or 20 pounds sterling for Gough Island, Inaccessible Island or Nightingale Islands.
Somaliland	Visa on arrival	30 days for 30 US dollars, payable on arrival.
Sudan	Travel permit required	All foreigners travelling more than 25 kilometres outside of Khartoum must obtain a travel permit.
(Sudan) Darfur	Travel permit required	Separate travel permit is required.
Asia
India PAP/RAP	PAP/RAP required	Protected Area Permit (PAP) required for all of Arunachal Pradesh, Manipur, Mizoram and parts of Himachal Pradesh, Jammu and Kashmir and Uttarakhand. Restricted Area Permit (RAP) required for all of Andaman and Nicobar Islands and Lakshadweep and parts of Sikkim. Some of these requirements are occasionally lifted for a year.
Kazakhstan	Special permission required	Special permission required for the town of Baikonur and surrounding areas in Kyzylorda Oblast, and the town of Gvardeyskiy near Almaty.
(Iran) Kish Island	Visa not required	Visitors to Kish Island do not require a visa.
Malaysia: Sabah and Sarawak	Visa not required	These states have their own immigration authorities and passport is required to travel to them, however the same visa applies.
Maldives	Permission required	With the exception of the capital Malé, tourists are generally prohibited from visiting non-resort islands without the express permission of the Government of Maldives.
Palestine	Visa not required	Arrival by sea to Gaza Strip not allowed.
(Tajikistan) Gorno-Badakhshan Autonomous Province	OIVR permit required	OIVR permit required (15+5 Tajikistani Somoni) and another special permit (free of charge) is required for Lake Sarez.
(United Nations) Korean Demilitarized Zone	Restricted zone	
(United Nations) UNDOF Zone and Ghajar	Restricted zone	
Yemen	Special permission required	Special permission needed for travel outside Sana'a or Aden.
Caribbean and North Atlantic
Anguilla	Visa not required	3 months
Aruba	Visa not required	30 days
Bermuda	Visa not required	lesser than 6 months
(Netherlands) Bonaire, St. Eustatius and Saba	Visa not required	30 days
British Virgin Islands	Visa not required	30 days
Cayman Islands	Visa not required	60 days for tourism / 10 days for business
Curacao	Visa not required	30 days
(France) French Guiana	Visa not required	90 days
(France) French West Indies	Visa not required	French West Indies refers to Martinique, Guadeloupe, Saint Martin and Saint Barthélemy.
Greenland	Visa not required	90 days
Montserrat	Visa not required	90 days
Puerto Rico	Visa required	
Saint Pierre and Miquelon	Visa not required	90 days
Sint Maarten	Visa not required	3 months
Turks and Caicos Islands	Visa not required	90 days
U.S. Virgin Islands	Visa required	
Oceania
American Samoa	Visa required	
(Australia) Ashmore and Cartier Islands	Special authorisation required	Special authorisation required.
(France) Clipperton Island	Special permit required	Special permit required.
Cook Islands	Visa not required	31 days
(Fiji) Lau Province	Special permission required	Special permission required.
French Polynesia	Visa not required	90 days
Guam	Visa not required	Visa free for holders of both Hong Kong Permanent Identity Cards and HKSAR Passport for a stay of less than 45 days. Visa required if without Hong Kong Permanent Identity Cards.
New Caledonia	Visa not required	90 days
Northern Mariana Islands	Visa not required	Visa free for holders of both Hong Kong Permanent Identity Cards and HKSAR Passport for a stay of less than 45 days. Visa required if without Hong Kong Permanent Identity Cards.
Niue	Visa on arrival	30 days
Pitcairn Islands	Visa not required	14 days visa free and landing fee US$35 or tax of US$5 if not going ashore.
United States Minor Outlying Islands	Special permits required	Special permits required for Baker Island, Howland Island, Jarvis Island, Johnston Atoll, Kingman Reef, Midway Atoll, Palmyra Atoll and Wake Island.
Wallis and Futuna	Visa not required	90 days
South America
Galápagos	Pre-registration required	Online pre-registration is required. Transit Control Card must also be obtained at the airport prior to departure.
South Atlantic and Antarctica
Falkland Islands	Visa not required	A visitor permit is normally issued as a stamp in the passport on arrival, The maximum validity period is 1 month.
South Georgia and the South Sandwich Islands	Permit required	Pre-arrival permit from the Commissioner required (72 hours/1 month for 110/160 pounds sterling).
Antarctica		Special permits required for British Antarctic Territory, French Southern and Antarctic Lands, Argentine Antarctica, (Australia) Australian Antarctic Territory, (Antártica Chilena Province) Chilean Antarctic Territory, (Australia) Heard Island and McDonald Islands, (Norway) Peter I Island, (Norway) Queen Maud Land, (New Zealand) Ross Dependency.

== APEC Business Travel Card ==
Full members of the scheme Transitional members (United States, Canada)

Holders of an APEC Business Travel Card (ABTC) travelling on business do not require a visa to the following countries:

- Australia^{2}
- Brunei^{2}
- Chile^{2}
- China^{4}
- Indonesia^{4}
- Japan^{2}
- Malaysia^{2}
- Mexico^{1}
- New Zealand^{2}
- Papua New Guinea^{4}
- Peru^{2}
- Philippines^{4}
- Russia^{3}
- Singapore^{4}
- South Korea^{2}
- Taiwan^{2}
- Thailand^{2}
- Vietnam^{4}

_{1 – Up to 180 days}
_{2 – Up to 90 days}
_{3 – Up to 90 days in a period of 180 days}
_{4 – Up to 60 days}

Permanent residents with Chinese nationality (holders of HKSAR passport / BN(O) passport) are required to apply for a Mainland Travel Permit to enter Mainland China, to the exclusion of all other documents.

The card must be used in conjunction with a passport and has the following advantages:

- No need to apply for a visa or entry permit to APEC countries, as the card is treated as such (except by Canada and United States)
- Undertake legitimate business in participating economies
- Expedited border crossing in all member economies, including transitional members

== Automated border control systems ==
Permanent residents of Hong Kong, residents holding a Document of Identity for visa purposes, and residents who have the right to land or is on unconditional stay in Hong Kong, all aged 11 and above are eligible to use the e-Channel Service at all control points run by the Hong Kong Immigration Department, provided that their biometric identifiers have been enrolled with Department.

In addition, HKSAR passport holders who intend to travel as tourists, are in general eligible to use the automated border control systems (eGates) when arriving in (or departing from) the following countries:

Country / Region	Type of entry	Duration of Allowed initial stay	Name of Immigration Authority	Name of ABC System	Ref
Australia	Electronic Travel Authority	90 days	Australian Border Force (ABF)	SmartGate	
Germany	Visa not required	90 days (within any 180-day period in the Schengen Area)	Requires pre-registration first time; German Federal Police	EasyPASS-RTP	
Indonesia	Visa not required	30 days	Directorate General of Immigration	Autogate	
Italy	Visa not required	90 days (within any 180-day period in the Schengen Area)	Rome Airport; Malpensa Airport; Polizia di Frontiera	EGate (Italy)	
Japan^{*}	Visa not required	90 days	Immigration Services Agency	Automated Gates	
Malaysia	Visa not required	90 days	Jabatan Imigresen Malaysia	Autogate and MACS 2.0	
Netherlands	Visa not required	90 days	Immigratie en Naturalisatiedienst (IND); First register for the Entry/Exit System (EES) at a self-service kiosk. Scan passport and provide fingerprints. After initial registration, proceed through the eGate directly (for all future visits).	Self-service passport control (eGates)	
New Zealand	Electronic Travel Authority	3 months	New Zealand Customs Service	eGate	
Portugal _{2}	Visa not required	90 days (within any 180-day period in the Schengen Area)	Departure only; Serviço de Estrangeiros e Fronteiras (SEF)	RAPID4ALL	
South Korea^{1}	Visa not required	3 months	Korea Immigration Service	SmartPass	
Thailand	Visa not required	30 days	Royal Thai Police Immigration Bureau	Automated Passport Control (APC)	
United Arab Emirates^{1}	Visa not required	30 days	Federal Authority for Identity, Citizenship, Customs and Port Security (FAICCPS)	Smart Gate	
United Kingdom *	ETA	6 months	Requires pre-registration as part of the Registered Traveller Programme and must meet certain conditions, £70 fee for initial registration; UK Border Force	EPassport gates	

_{* – Automated system enrollment eligibility is limited only to certain categories of travellers.}

_{1 – First-time visitors are required to enrol on their first visit and can only use the automated gates on their subsequent visits.}

_{2 – Use of the E-Gates is only valid when departing from the country and when the traveller is aged 16 & above.}

== Non-visa restrictions ==
=== Blank passport pages ===
Many countries require a minimum number of blank pages to be available in the passport being presented, typically one or two pages. Endorsement pages, which often appear after the visa pages, are not counted as being valid or available.

=== Vaccination ===
Cover of the new International Certificate of Vaccination issued by the Bureau of Quarantine in the Philippines since 2021

The African countries of Angola, Benin, Burkina Faso, Burundi, Cameroon, Central African Republic, Democratic Republic of the Congo, Republic of the Congo, Côte d'Ivoire, Gabon, Ghana, Guinea-Bissau, Mali, Niger, Sierra Leone and Togo, South Sudan and Uganda, along with French Guiana in South America, require all incoming passengers older than nine months to one year, to have a current International Certificate of Vaccination or Prophylaxis.

Some other countries require vaccination only if the passenger is coming from an infected area or has visited one recently or has transited for 12 hours in those countries: Algeria, Botswana, Cabo Verde, Chad, Djibouti, Egypt, Eswatini, Ethiopia, Gambia, Ghana, Guinea, Lesotho, Libya, Equatorial Guinea, Eritrea, Madagascar, Malawi, Mauritania, Mauritius, Mozambique, Namibia, Nigeria, Papua New Guinea, Seychelles, Somalia, South Africa, Sudan, Tunisia, Uganda, Tanzania, Zambia and Zimbabwe.

=== Passport validity length ===
Very few countries, such as Paraguay, just require a valid passport on arrival.

However many countries and groupings now require only an identity card – especially from their neighbours. Other countries may have special bilateral arrangements that depart from the generality of their passport validity length policies to shorten the period of passport validity required for each other's citizens or even accept passports that have already expired (but not been cancelled).

Some countries, such as Japan, Ireland and the United Kingdom, require a passport valid throughout the period of the intended stay.

In the absence of specific bilateral agreements, countries requiring passports to be valid for at least 6 more months on arrival include Afghanistan, Algeria, Anguilla, Bahrain, Bhutan, Botswana, British Virgin Islands, Brunei, Cambodia, Cameroon, Cape Verde, Cayman Islands, Central African Republic, Chad, Comoros, Costa Rica, Côte d'Ivoire, Curaçao, Ecuador, Egypt, El Salvador, Equatorial Guinea, Fiji, Gabon, Guinea Bissau, Guyana, Haiti, India, Indonesia, Iran, Iraq, Israel, Jordan, Kenya, Kiribati, Kuwait, Laos, Madagascar, Malaysia, Marshall Islands, Mongolia, Myanmar, Namibia, Nepal, Nicaragua, Nigeria, Oman, Palau, Papua New Guinea, Peru, Philippines, Qatar, Rwanda, Samoa, Saudi Arabia, Singapore, Solomon Islands, Somalia, Sri Lanka, Sudan, Suriname, Tanzania, Thailand, Timor-Leste, Tokelau, Tonga, Turkey, Tuvalu, Uganda, United Arab Emirates, Vanuatu, Venezuela, and Vietnam.

Countries requiring passports valid for at least 4 months on arrival include Micronesia and Zambia.

Countries requiring passports with a validity of at least 3 months beyond the date of intended departure include Azerbaijan, Bosnia and Herzegovina, Honduras, Montenegro, Nauru, Moldova and New Zealand. Similarly, the EEA countries of Iceland, Liechtenstein, Norway, all European Union countries (except Ireland) together with Switzerland also require 3 months validity beyond the date of the bearer's intended departure unless the bearer is an EEA or Swiss national.

Countries requiring passports valid for at least 3 months on arrival include Albania, North Macedonia, Panama, and Senegal.

Bermuda requires passports to be valid for at least 45 days upon entry.

Countries that require a passport validity of at least one month beyond the date of intended departure include Eritrea, Hong Kong, Lebanon, Macau, the Maldives and South Africa.

==== Maximum passport age ====
Countries of the Schengen area require non-EU passports to be less than 10 years old upon entry.

=== Criminal record ===
Some countries, including Australia, Canada, Fiji, New Zealand and the United States, routinely deny entry to non-citizens who have a criminal record, while others impose restrictions depending on the type of conviction and the length of the sentence.

=== Persona non grata ===
The government of a country can declare a diplomat persona non grata, banning them from entering the country or expelling them if they have already entered. In non-diplomatic use, the authorities of a country may also declare a foreigner persona non grata permanently or temporarily, usually because of unlawful activity.

=== Israeli stamps ===
Kuwait, Lebanon, Libya, and Yemen do not allow entry to people with passport stamps from Israel or whose passports have either a used or an unused Israeli visa, or where there is evidence of previous travel to Israel such as entry or exit stamps from neighbouring border posts in transit countries such as Jordan and Egypt.

To circumvent this Arab League boycott of Israel, the Israeli immigration services have now mostly ceased to stamp foreign nationals' passports on either entry to or exit from Israel (unless the entry is for some work-related purposes). Since 15 January 2013, Israel no longer stamps foreign passports at Ben Gurion Airport. Passports are still (as of 22 June 2017) stamped at Erez when passing into and out of Gaza.

Iran refuses admission to holders of passports containing an Israeli visa or stamp that is less than 12 months old.

=== Biometrics ===
Several countries mandate that all travellers, or all foreign travellers, be fingerprinted on arrival and will refuse admission to or even arrest travellers who refuse to comply. In some countries, such as the United States, this may apply even to transit passengers who merely wish to change planes rather than go landside.

Fingerprinting countries/regions include Afghanistan, Argentina, Brunei, Cambodia, China, Ethiopia, Ghana, Guinea, India, Japan, Kenya (both fingerprints and a photo are taken), Malaysia upon entry and departure, Mongolia, Saudi Arabia, the Schengen Area, Singapore, South Korea, Taiwan, Thailand, Uganda, the United Arab Emirates and the United States.

Many countries also require a photo be taken of people entering the country. The United States, which does not fully implement exit control formalities at its land frontiers (although long mandated by its own legislation), intends to implement facial recognition for passengers departing from international airports to identify people who overstay their visa.

Together with fingerprint and face recognition, iris scanning is one of three biometric identification technologies internationally standardised since 2006 by the International Civil Aviation Organization (ICAO) for use in e-passports and the United Arab Emirates conducts iris scanning on visitors who need to apply for a visa. The United States Department of Homeland Security has announced plans to greatly increase the biometric data it collects at US borders. In 2018, Singapore began trials of iris scanning at three land and maritime immigration checkpoints.

== See also ==
- Visa requirements for British Nationals (Overseas)
- Visa requirements for Chinese citizens of Macau
- Visa requirements for Chinese citizens (mainland)
- Visa policy of Hong Kong
- Hong Kong Special Administrative Region passport
