= Visa policy of Macau =

Policy on permits required to enter Macau

Most visitors to Macau are issued a 30-day visa on arrival unless they are citizens from one of the visa-exempt countries.

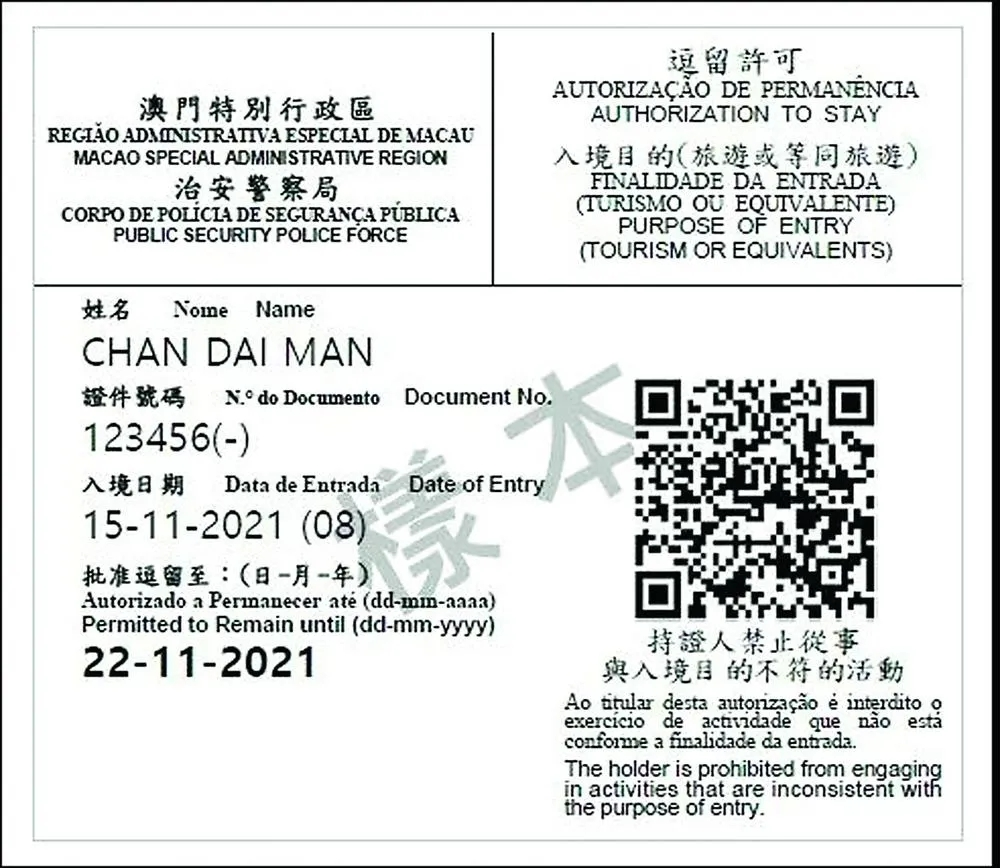
Authorization To Stay

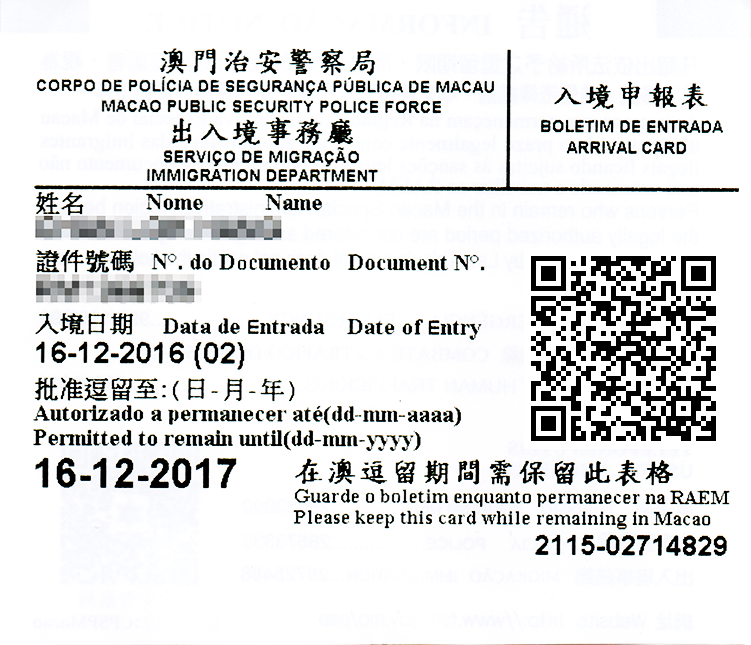

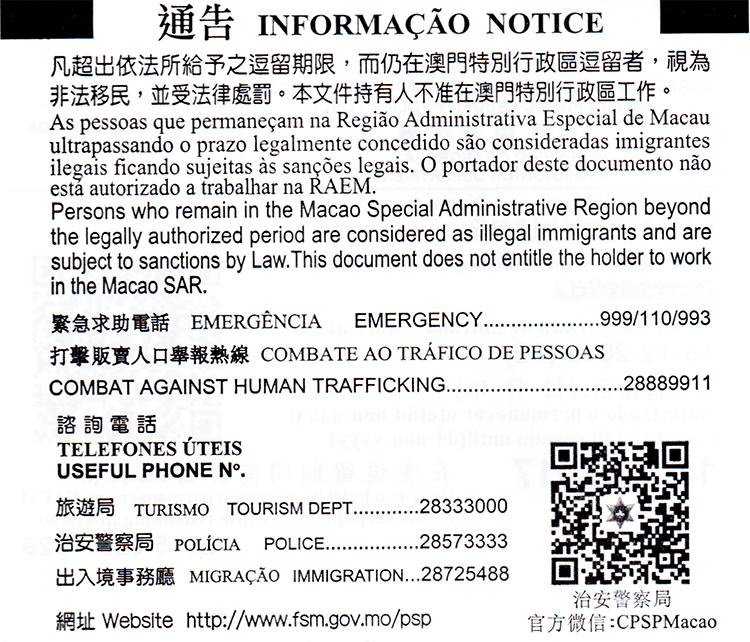
Former Macau Arrival Card, was replaced in 2021

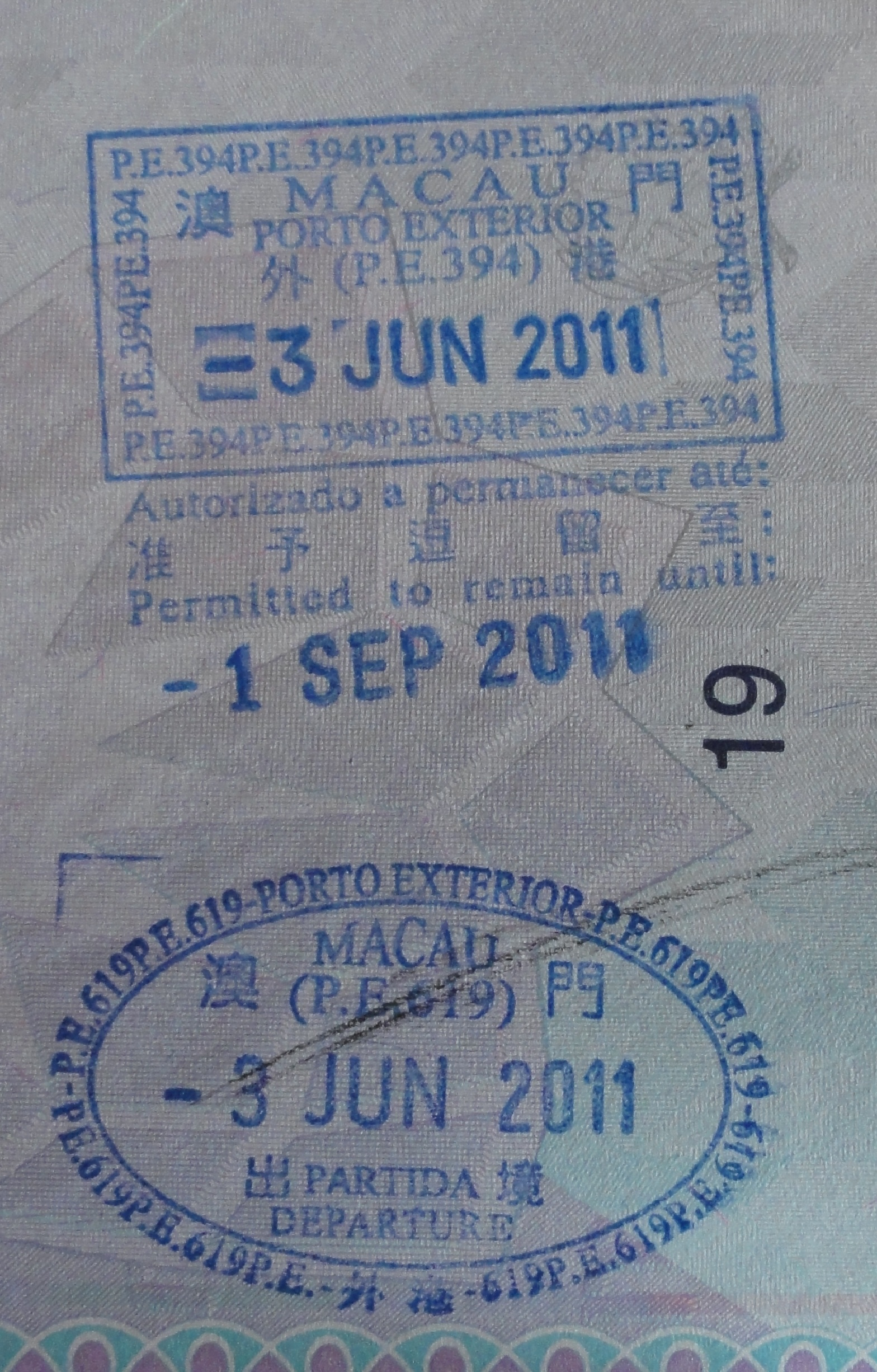
Former Macau passport stamps, were replaced in 2013

However, citizens of certain countries must obtain a visa from one of the Chinese diplomatic missions.

The Serviço de Migração (Immigration Department), under the Public Security Police Force, is the government agency responsible for immigration matters, whilst the Public Security Police Force itself is responsible for enforcing immigration laws in Macau.

All visitors must hold a passport, travel document and any other documents accepted for the purpose of immigration control valid for 90 days beyond the period of intended stay in Macau.

Under the one country, two systems policy, Macau maintains its immigration and visa policy independently from the rest of China. Consequently, entering Macau from mainland China or Hong Kong requires passing through immigration checkpoints of mainland China or Hong Kong. Whilst Hong Kong residents have visa-free access for short visits to Macau, mainland residents must obtain a Two-way Permit (EEP) with the appropriate exit endorsement from the Chinese Ministry of Public Security before visiting Macau.

== Visa policy map ==
Visa policy of Macau Macau May enter with Entry–Exit Permit for Hong Kong SAR or Macau SAR - Varies Visa not required (1 year) Visa not required (6 months) Visa not required (90 days) Visa not required (30 days) Visa not required (14 days) Visa on arrival Visa required

== Unrestricted stay ==
Under Macanese laws, holders of the following documents are residents of Macau and are allowed to return to Macau:

- Macau Resident Identity Card
- Macao Special Administrative Region passport
- Macao Special Administrative Region Travel Permit
- Visit Permit for Residents of Macao to HKSAR

== Visa exemption ==
Citizens of the following countries and territories may enter Macau without a visa for the following period:

1 year

- Hong Kong^{1}

_{1 - Holders of Hong Kong Permanent Residence Identity Cars, Hong Kong Re-entry Permit or Hong Kong Identity Card bearing the marks "*", "***", or "R" only, regardless of nationality.}

6 months

- United Kingdom^{1}

_{1 - All classes of British nationality.}

90 days

- All European Union member states^{1}

- Albania
- Andorra
- Armenia
- Bosnia and Herzegovina
- Brazil
- Cape Verde
- Dominica
- Egypt
- Grenada
- Iceland
- Israel
- Japan
- Lebanon
- Liechtenstein
- Mali
- Mauritius
- Mexico
- Moldova
- Mongolia
- Montenegro
- Morocco
- New Zealand
- North Macedonia
- Norway
- Serbia
- South Korea
- Switzerland
- Tanzania
- Uruguay

_{1 - Except holders of Portuguese passports issued to Macau residents.}

30 days

- Argentina
- Australia
- Belarus
- Bahrain
- Canada
- Chile
- Ecuador
- Hong Kong^{1}
- India
- Indonesia
- Kiribati
- Kuwait
- Malaysia
- Monaco
- Namibia
- Oman
- Philippines
- Portugal^{3}
- Qatar
- Russia
- Samoa
- Saudi Arabia
- Seychelles
- Singapore
- South Africa
- Taiwan^{2}
- Thailand
- Turkey
- United Arab Emirates
- United States^{4}
- San Marino

_{1 - Non-Permanent Residents holding Hong Kong Document of Identity for Visa Purposes.
2 - Also applicable to holders of Taiwan Compatriot Permits.
3 - Holders of a travel document issued by Portugal to non-citizens who are unable to obtain national passports.
4 - Not applicable to holders of U.S. diplomatic passports.}

14 days

- Brunei
- Kazakhstan

7 days

- China^{1}
- Hong Kong^{1}

_{1 - Entering with a passport as a transit passenger.}

Unlimited access

- United Nations Laissez-Passer holders
- Holders of diplomatic passports
- Holders of diplomatic or consular identity cards issued by the Macau SAR

=== Entry procedures for Chinese nationals not residing in Macau ===
Special regulations are in force for persons of Chinese nationality who are not residents of Macau.

Household registration	Residency	Travel document	Duration of stay
Mainland China	Mainland China	Permit for Proceeding to Hong Kong and Macao (One-way Permit)	7 years
Mainland China	Mainland China or overseas	Chinese passport Chinese Travel Document; Taiwan Travel Permit with a valid endorsement	7 days (for transit to and from another country or territory only)
Mainland China	Mainland China or overseas	Exit-Entry Permit for Travelling to and from Hong Kong and Macau with a valid endorsement (Two-way Permit)	Varies, at least 7 days
Mainland China	Overseas	Chinese passport and a document showing overseas residency	7 days (extendable to 90 days)
Hong Kong (permanent)	Anywhere	Hong Kong Permanent Identity Card; Hong Kong Re-entry Permit	1 year
Hong Kong (permanent)	Anywhere	Hong Kong Special Administrative Region passport	7 days (for transit to and from another country or territory only)
Hong Kong (temporary)	Anywhere	Hong Kong Document of Identity for Visa Purposes	30 days

==== Mainland China ====
Mainland Chinese visitors to Macau may enter Macau with a Two-way Permit. The duration of stay is the one indicated on the exit endorsement, but if the duration indicated is longer than 90 days, the person must report to PSPF for a "special authorization of stay" within the first 90 days of entry. For those who are travelling to or from a third country or region, they can alternatively use their Chinese passports, Chinese Travel Documents or Taiwan Travel Permit with a valid exit endorsement for a maximum stay of 7 days.

Mainland Chinese visitors to Macau who live abroad can also use a PRC passport with a document showing overseas residency. They can stay in Macao for a duration of 7 days (extendable to 90 days).

Non-permanent residents of Hong Kong with household registration in mainland China are required to travel with the Two-way Permit along with the valid entry endorsement when travelling directly between Hong Kong and Macau, unless they also hold a resident permit of a third country, in which they can use their PRC passport and residency permit issued by that country.

==== Hong Kong ====
Permanent residents of Hong Kong holding valid Hong Kong Permanent Identity Cards or Hong Kong Re-entry Permits are granted a stay of 1 year upon entry. Non-permanent residents of Hong Kong can enter for up to 30 days if they hold a Hong Kong Document of Identity for Visa Purposes to Macau.

Holders of HKSAR passports are granted a stay of 7 days providing they are transiting to a third country.

=== Entry procedures for visa nationals ===
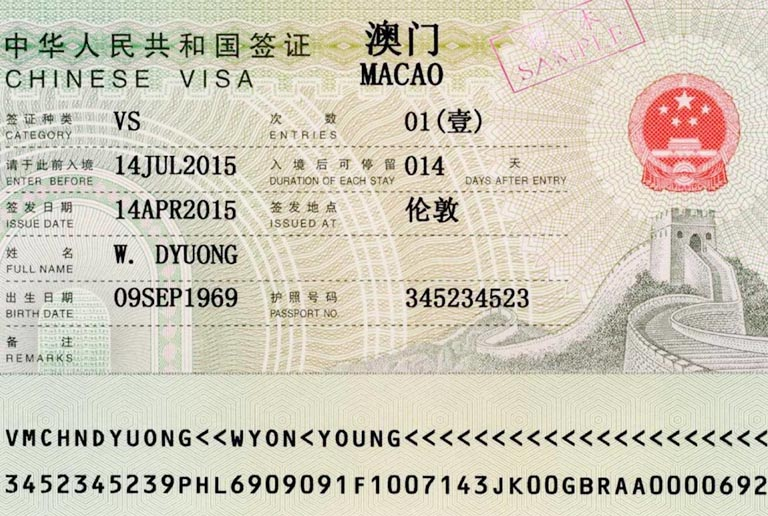
Sample of a Macau visa issued by Chinese missions (current version)

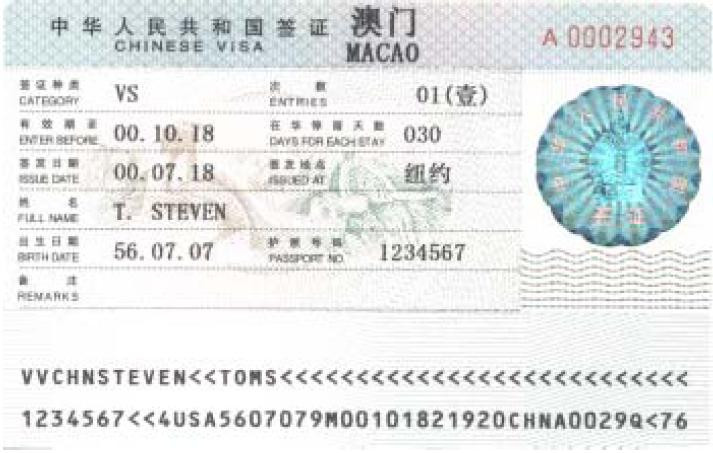
Sample of a Macau visa issued by Chinese missions (old version)

Those holding travel documents that are not listed above will be required to obtain an Entry Permit (Visa On Arrival or VOA) for entry to Macau, either prior to arrival or on arrival. Visa on arrival provides granted Authorization to Stay for a maximum of 30 days once the application is approved. Updated VOA application fees as of October 2025 are MOP200 (single entry) / MOP300 (multiple entry) for individual, MOP400 (single entry) / MOP600 (multiple entry) for family passport, MOP100 (single entry) / MOP150 (multiple entry) for children under 12 with individual passport and MOP100 (single entry) / MOP150 (multiple entry) for groups of at least 10 people organized by a single travel manager and presenting a collective travel document. Alternatively, they can apply for an "Authorization to Enter and Stay" through a representative in Macau.

Nationals of the following countries must obtain a visa in advance through the Chinese diplomatic mission (unless they hold a Hong Kong permanent identity card). They can apply for an "Authorization to Enter and Stay" through a representative only when there are no Chinese diplomatic missions in their country or region of residence.

- Bangladesh
- Nepal^{1}
- Nigeria
- Pakistan
- Sri Lanka^{1}
- United States^{2}
- Vietnam

_{1 - except for holders of diplomatic or official passports who are visa-exempt for up to 14 days.}
_{2 - diplomatic passport only.}

=== Entry refusal ===
Under Macanese law, visitors will be denied entry if:

- they have been deported from Macau,
- they have been prohibited from entering, staying in or transiting through Macau in accordance with local or international law.

In addition, visitors may be denied entry if:

- they are frequently entering Macau without justification,
- they have criminal convictions resulting in incarceration,
- they have committed, or have the intention of committing, a crime,
- they have no proof to support that they are bona fide visitors who will leave Macau at the end of their visit (e.g., insufficient funds, not possessing onward tickets or not possessing genuine travel documents).

=== Extending short stays in Macau ===
Visitors who have entered with short stay status can extend their "Authorization to Stay", should their travel plans change, by no more than 90 days. This can be done by applying at the local Serviço de Migração office.

=== Future changes ===
Macau has signed visa exemption agreements with the following countries, but they have not yet entered into force:

Country	Passports	Agreement signed on
Angola	Ordinary	4 September 2026

== Transit ==
Nationals who would normally require visas may enter Macau without a visa for 48 hours if they arrive and depart from Macau International Airport.

== Long stay ==
=== Special Authorization to Stay for Non-resident Students ===
Non-resident students in possession of a valid travel document have to go to the Foreigners Subdivision of the Serviço de Migração office located in Taipa, to apply for a "Special Authorization to Stay" (Chinese: 外地學生之逗留的特別許可, Portuguese: Autorização Especial de Permanência para Estudantes do Exterior). The Special Authorization to Stay for Non-resident Students is usually valid until 31 December if the study program ends on a date beyond the year, or valid until the last day of the program if the study program ends within the same year. For those who are enrolled in a study program which ends on a date beyond the year, can renew their Special Authorization to Stay for Non-resident Students before the expiry (expiries usually 31 December), only if the Non-resident student continues to be enrolled in the study program at the same higher institute in Macau.

=== Residence ===
Those wanting to take up residence in Macau for purposes of investment can do so via the Macau Trade and Investment Office in Macau, and then visit the local Serviço de Migração office.

Those wanting to take up residence for other reasons, such as employment, are required to make their application at their local Serviço de Migração office. The procedure varies depending on nationality and residency status. Chinese and Portuguese nationals should make their application via the Comissariado de Residentes at the local Serviço de Migração office, whilst foreign nationals should apply via the Comissariado de Estrangeiros at the local Serviço de Migração office.

== Visitor statistics ==
Most visitors arriving in Macau were from the following countries of nationality:

Country/Territory	2017	2016	2015	2014
Mainland China	22,196,203	20,454,104	20,410,615	21,252,410
Hong Kong	6,165,129	6,419,839	6,534,543	6,426,608
Taiwan	1,060,107	1,074,525	988,059	953,753
South Korea	874,253	662,321	554,177	554,521
Japan	328,990	300,613	282,217	299,849
Philippines	307,139	287,025	276,806	262,853
Malaysia	218,301	222,809	229,102	250,046
Thailand	198,222	236,169	180,836	175,906
Indonesia	197,139	182,467	163,353	189,189
United States	186,378	190,885	182,532	181,457
India	148,121	165,278	167,578	167,216
Singapore	143,068	155,763	158,814	196,491
Australia	88,988	93,286	92,404	105,914
Canada	74,287	75,173	70,973	70,601
United Kingdom	57,121	61,301	59,985	60,756
Total	32,610,506	30,950,336	30,714,628	31,525,632

== See also ==
- Visa policy of China
- Visa policy of Hong Kong
- Visa requirements for Chinese citizens of Macau
