= Identification Services Bureau =

- Direcção dos Serviços de Identificação 身份證明局

Agency overview
- Jurisdiction: Macau
- Headquarters: Avenida da Praia Grande, nº804, Edifício China Plaza, 1.º andar
- Director responsible: Chao Wai Ieng
- Deputy director responsible: Lo Pin Heng; Chan Un Lai
- Parent department: Secretary for Administration and Justice
- Website: www.dsi.gov.mo

The Identification Services Bureau (Chinese: 身份證明局, Portuguese: Direcção dos Serviços de Identificação, DSI) is the agency responsible for civil and criminal identification and travel documents in Macau. It is under the administration of the Secretary for Administration and Justice.

== Responsibilities ==
The bureau is responsible for civil and criminal identification of Macau residents, handling resident identity cards and travel documents, and dealing with requests relating to the nationality and the right of abode of residents.
