= Macao Special Administrative Region passport =

Passport issued to permanent residents of Macao SAR who are Chinese citizens

Macao Special Administrative Region passport 澳門特別行政區護照
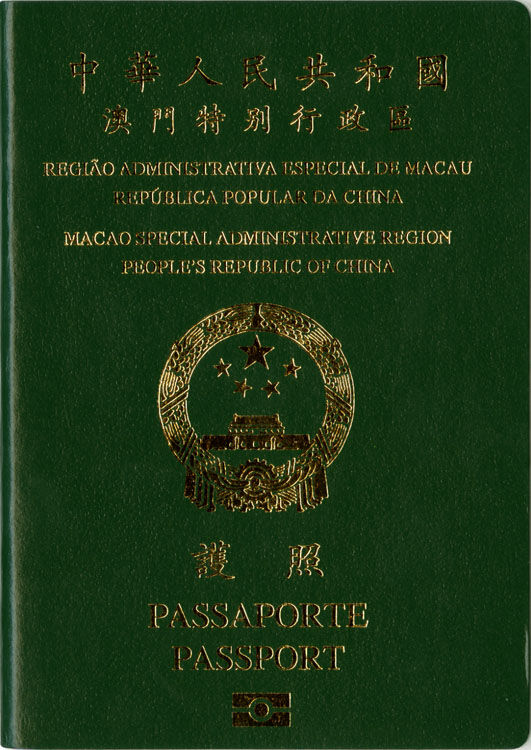
- The front cover of the Macao SAR ePassport issued since September 2009
- Type: Passport
- Issued by: Identification Services Bureau
- First issued: 1999 (first version); September 2009 (second version); December 2019 (third version)
- Eligibility: Chinese citizens who are permanent residents of Macau
- Expiration: 10 years (over 18 years old); 5 years (under 18 years old)
- Cost: MOP$430

Macao Special Administrative Region passport

Chinese name
- Traditional Chinese: 澳門特別行政區護照
- Simplified Chinese: 澳门特别行政区护照
Transcriptions
Standard Mandarin
- Hanyu Pinyin: Àomén Tèbiéxíngzhèngqū Hùzhào
Yue: Cantonese
- Yale Romanization: Ou mún dahk biht hàhng jing kēui wuh jiu
- Jyutping: ou^{3} mun^{2} dak^{6} bit^{6} hang^{4} zing^{3} keoi^{1} wu^{6} ziu^{3}

Portuguese name
- Portuguese: Passaporte da Região Administrativa Especial de Macau

The Macao Special Administrative Region passport (Chinese: 澳門特別行政區護照; Portuguese: Passaporte da Região Administrativa Especial de Macau) is a passport issued to Chinese citizens who are permanent residents of the Chinese Special Administrative Region of Macau.

In accordance with Macau Basic Law, since the handover of Macau on 20 December 1999, this passport has been issued by the Identification Services Bureau (under the Secretariat for Administration and Justice) of the government of Macau under the prerogative of the Central People's Government of the People's Republic of China.

The official languages of Macau are Portuguese and Chinese; consequently, all the passport's text is in Traditional Chinese characters and Portuguese in addition to English.

== Historical background ==
According to the nationality law of the People's Republic of China and the explanations given for some questions by the Standing Committee of the National People's Congress concerning the implementation of nationality law in Macau, any Macau permanent resident holding Chinese nationality can apply for the Macau SAR passport.

Many residents of Macau also possess Portuguese citizenship by virtue of being born in Macau before 3 October 1981, naturalization, or being born to parents with Portuguese citizenship in Macau. Such citizens are also eligible for, and often hold, a Portuguese passport, which grants more visa-free countries than the MSAR passport as well as permitting free movement of passport holders in the European Union.

== Physical features ==
The 2nd version of the passport, a biometric passport, was first issued by the Identification Services Bureau at the start of September 2009, replacing the previous machine-readable type.

=== Front cover ===
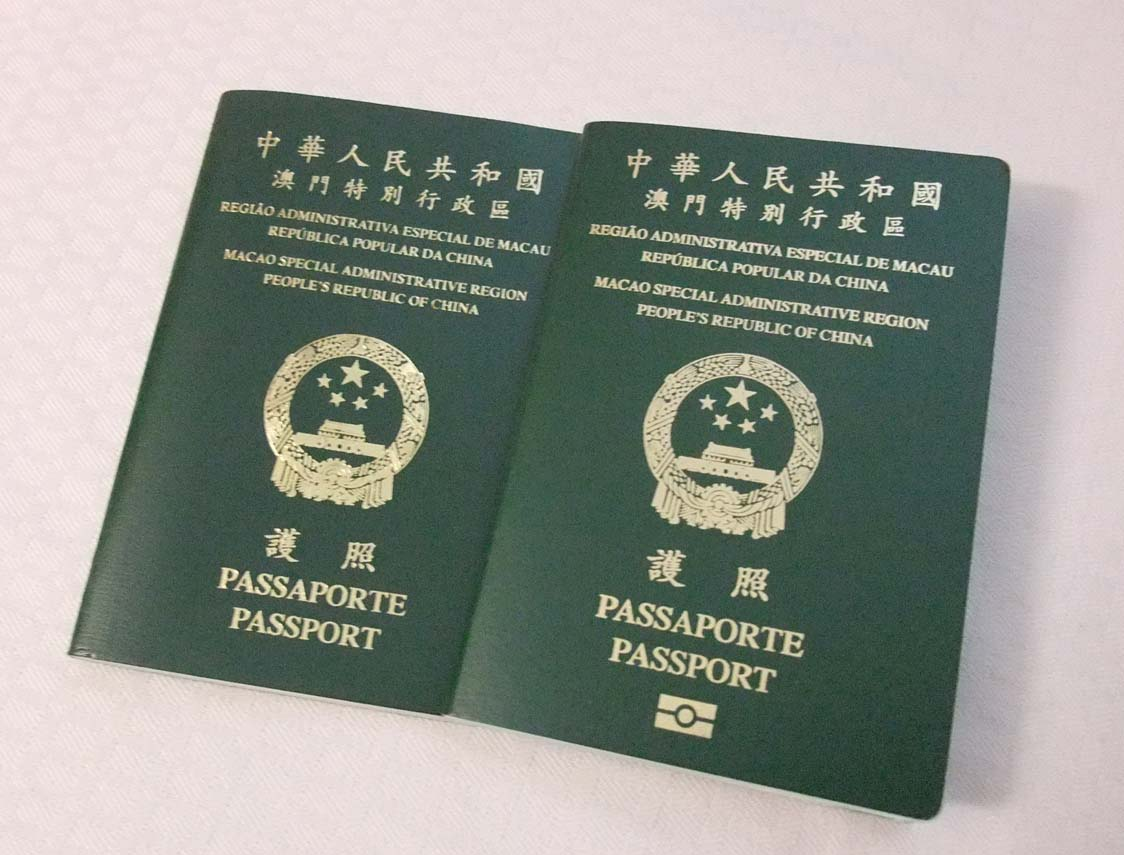
The older, non-biometric passport issued until 2009 (left), and its newer, biometric counterpart issued since 2009 (right)

The cover of the passport is coloured bottle green with the national emblem of China emblazoned centermost at the front. The passport's front cover is inscribed with the titles of the PRC and the SAR in Chinese: 中華人民共和國澳門特別行政區護照, in Portuguese: Região Administrativa Especial de Macau, República Popular da China, Passaporte, and in English: Macao Special Administrative Region, People's Republic of China, Passport. Each passport consists of 48 numbered pages of size 125 mm × 88 mm (4.9 in × 3.5 in) emprinted with artistic designs featuring Macau's world culture heritage sites.

=== Inside front cover ===
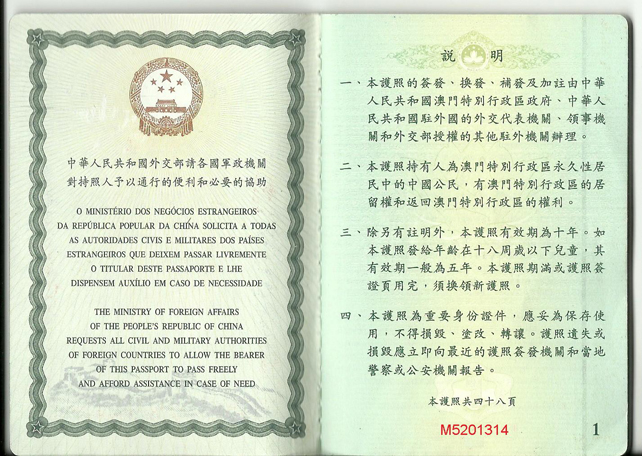
Inside front cover and first page of the old version Macau SAR passport

The passport note appears on the second page in Chinese, Portuguese, and English, in all caps:

中華人民共和國外交部請各國軍政機關對持照人予以通行的便利和必要的協助

O Ministério dos Negócios Estrangeiros da República Popular da China solicita a todas as autoridades civis e militares dos países estrangeiros que deixem passar livremente o titular deste passaporte e lhe dispensem auxílio em caso de necessidade

The Ministry of Foreign Affairs of the People's Republic of China requests all civil and military authorities of foreign countries to allow the bearer of this passport to pass freely and afford assistance in case of need

=== Biodata page ===
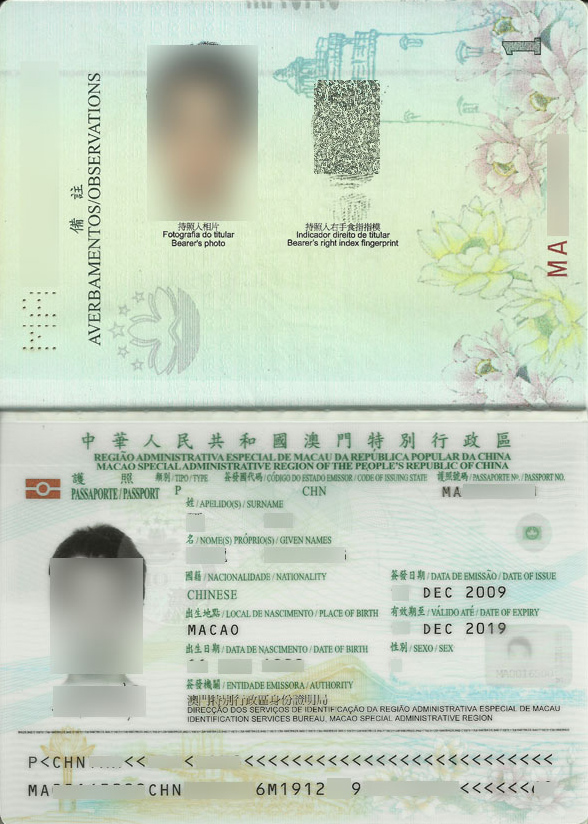
Biodata pages of the Macau SAR ePassport

The biodata page of the passport includes, in all caps:

- Passport type: P
- Code of Issuing State: CHN (People's Republic of China)
- Passport number (A valid Macao passport number consists of nine characters: two uppercase letters, followed by seven digits)
- Surname and Given Names: in traditional Chinese and English/Portuguese
- Nationality: "Chinese" (Pre-printed, the nationality code is CHN as shown in the machine readable zone)
- Sex: denoted as "M" (male) or "F" (female)
- Place of birth: if born in China, name of the province, autonomous region or municipality; if born in Hong Kong or Macao, 'Hong Kong' or 'Macao'; if born in other countries, name of country.
- Dates of birth, issue and expiry: displayed in the format DD-MMM-YYYY (e.g. 01 JAN 1970)
- Authority (of issue): "澳門特別行政區身份證明局", "Direcção dos Serviços de Identificação da Região Administrativa Especial de Macau", "Identification Services Bureau, Macao Special Administrative Region"

Besides personal data, the supplemental page of passport is printed with the picture and fingerprint of that holder.

=== Explanatory notes ===
The passport's explanatory notes are located on pages 45, 46, and 47 of the passport. The following text is pre-printed on the passport explanatory notes page in Chinese, Portuguese, and English:

1. The issuance, replacement, reissuance and endorsement of this passport shall be effected by the Government of the Macao Special Administrative Region of the People's Republic of China, diplomatic and consular missions of the People's Republic of China in foreign countries, or other Chinese authorities in foreign countries under the entrustment of the Ministry of Foreign Affairs of the People's Republic of China.
2. The bearer of this passport is a Chinese citizen who is a permanent resident of the Macao Special Administrative Region, and has the right of abode in and the right to return to the Region.
3. This passport is valid for ten years, unless otherwise stated. But it is normally valid for five years if issued to a child under eighteen years of age. This passport shall be replaced by a new one when its validity period expires or it has no further space for visas.
4. This passport is an important document of identity which shall be kept carefully and used properly. It shall not be mutilated, tampered with, or transferred to another person for unlawful use. Any case of loss or destruction should be immediately reported to the nearest issuing authority and the local police or public security authorities.

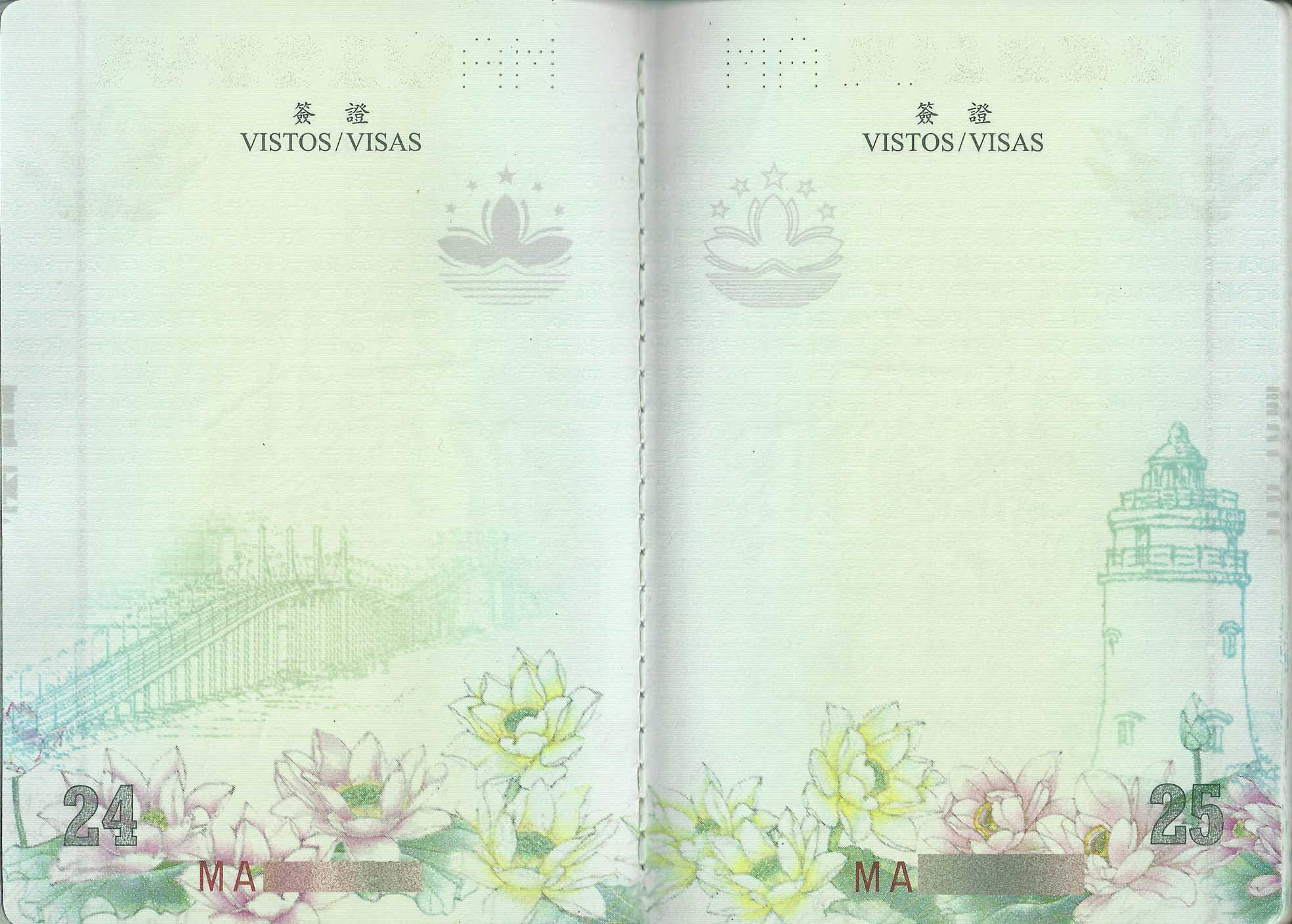
Visa pages of the Macau SAR ePassport

== Application procedure ==
Macau SAR passports are only issued by the Identification Services Bureau in Macau. An applicant must fill out an application form, possess a Macau SAR Permanent Resident Identity Card and two recent 1½-inch colour photos along with (if replacing an old passport) their prior Macau SAR Passport.

Qualified applicants can apply in Macau or overseas if necessary.

== Usage ==
=== Mainland China ===
Although MSAR passport is endorsed by Chinese government, the Ministry of Public Security (MPS) does not accept MSAR passports for traveling between the mainland and Macau, since both mainland and Macau authorities agreed that using a passport for 'domestic' travel is 'unnecessary' and 'inappropriate'. Macau residents who are eligible to hold a Macau SAR passport are also eligible to apply for a Mainland Travel Permit for Hong Kong and Macao Residents (colloquially known as a "Home Return Permit") through the MPS, which serves as a travel document for Chinese citizen Macau residents to travel to the mainland. The issuance is entirely at the discretion of the MPS, which is represented in Macau by the China Travel Service, and possession of a Macau SAR passport does not necessarily guarantee the issuing of a Home Return Permit.

Macau residents who travel to the mainland from a third country without Home Return Permit may obtain a Chinese Travel Document from an overseas Chinese embassy or consulate prior to their departure from the third country.

=== Hong Kong ===
Regardless of their citizenship status, Macau permanent residents do not need passports to enter Hong Kong. Instead, residents must bring their permanent ID card, which grants 180-day visa free access to Hong Kong. Non-permanent residents can use a Visit Permit for Residents of Macao to HKSAR to enter Hong Kong for up to 30 days visa-free.

When Macao residents travel abroad via Hong Kong, such residents can use their MSAR passports to enter Hong Kong and stay 7 days visa-free.

=== Overseas ===
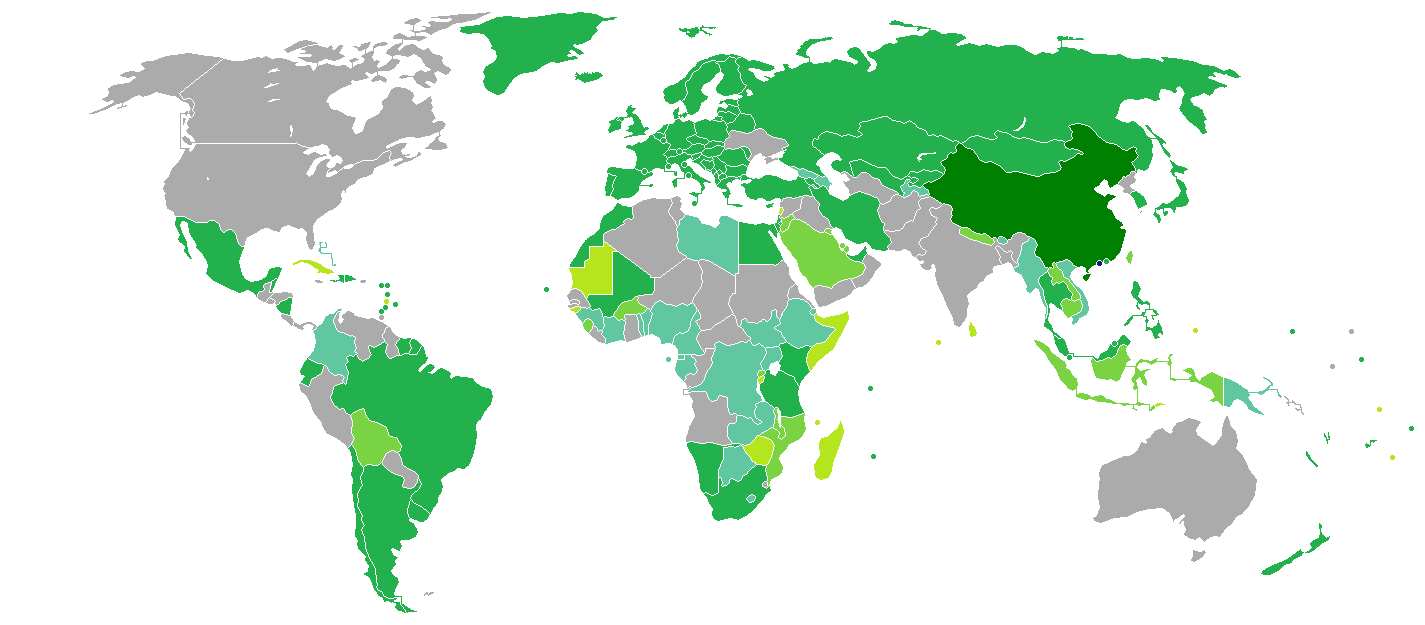
Visa requirements for Chinese citizens of Macau

According to Macau's Identity Services Bureau, as of January 13, 2025, Macau SAR passport holders enjoy visa-free access to 148 countries and territories worldwide, including all Member States of the European Union, Brazil, Japan, Malaysia, Russia, Singapore, South Africa and South Korea. According to the Henley Passport Index in 2025, the Macau SAR passport was ranked as the 31st most powerful passport worldwide; in contrast, the Hong Kong SAR passport was ranked 18th, while the PRC passport was ranked 60th.

As Chinese citizens, holders of a Macau Special Administrative Region passport are entitled to full consular protection by Chinese foreign missions abroad.

Macau SAR passport holders may undertake a paid activity (i.e. work) visa-free for a maximum of 90 days within a 180-day period in the Schengen Agreement signatory states of Belgium, Denmark, Iceland, Lithuania, Luxembourg, the Netherlands, Norway, Slovenia and Sweden (though not in Portugal). In Switzerland, another Schengen signatory state, Macao SAR passport holders can apply for a permit for "gainful occupation" of maximum 8 days in a calendar year during their visa-exempt stay without needing to apply for a work visa; however, this 8-day exemption does not cover occupation in the primary or secondary construction industry, civil engineering, catering and hotel services, industrial and private cleaning industries, surveillance and security services, and sex industry. Alternatively, if in possession of a long term residence permit issued by any other Schengen member state, a Macau SAR passport holder may undertake gainful occupation for up to 3 months visa-free in Switzerland without any of the aforementioned industry restrictions. In Croatia (a European Union member state which acceded to the Schengen agreement on 1st Jan 2024), Macao SAR passport holders may undertake a paid activity (i.e. work) visa-free for a maximum of 90 days within a 180-day period.

Macau SAR passport holders aged between 18 and 30 are eligible to apply under the Working Holiday Scheme by the New Zealand Government. If successful, a visa is issued which permits the holder to spend up to 12 months in New Zealand for the primary purpose of travel but allowing for supplementary short-term employment or study. The scheme is highly competitive as applicants from Macau and mainland China are subject to a quota of 1000 visas annually (there is a separate quota for Hong Kong applicants).

On 10 April 2013, the Prime Minister of Australia, Julia Gillard, announced that, starting from 2015, holders of Macao SAR e-passports (along with Hong Kong SAR and PRC passport holders) would be able to use SmartGates in Australia on a trial basis. The three passports were permanently included in the list of eligible nationalities in June 2016.

== See also ==
- Chinese passport
- Hong Kong Special Administrative Region passport
- Portuguese passport
- Portuguese nationality law
- Macao Special Administrative Region Travel Permit
- Visit Permit for Residents of Macao to HKSAR
- Chinese nationality law
- Mainland Travel Permit for Hong Kong and Macao Residents
- Mainland Travel Permit for Taiwan Residents
- Hong Kong Special Administrative Region passport
- Visa requirements for Chinese citizens of Macau
