= Visa requirements for Chinese citizens of Macau =

Rules for traveling abroad

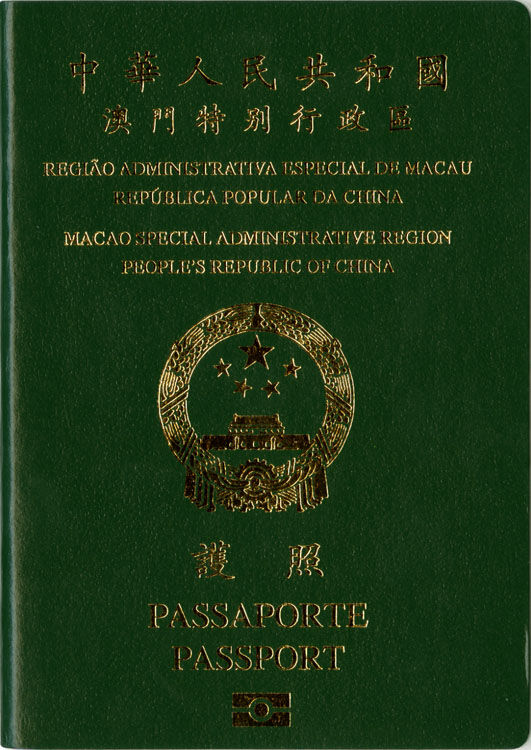
A Macau Special Administrative Region passport

Visa requirements for Chinese citizens of Macau SAR are administrative entry restrictions by the authorities of other states placed on Chinese citizens who are also permanent residents of Macau.

As of 2026, Macao Special Administrative Region passport holders have visa-free or visa on arrival access to 141 countries and territories, ranking the passport 29th in the world according to the Henley Passport Index.

== Visa requirements map ==
Visa requirements for Chinese citizens of Macau holding ordinary passports Macau Mainland Travel Permit travel Visa-free access Visa on arrival eVisa Visa available both on arrival or online Visa required

== Greater China including Taiwan ==
Jurisdiction	Visa requirement	Notes
China	With Home Return Permit (Freedom of movement)	Holders of Mainland Travel Permit for Hong Kong and Macao Residents are able to freely enter Mainland China for all purposes within the validity of their travel document. Most permits for adults are valid for 10 years; minors under 18 years old are issued permits valid for five years. Not required if holding an MSAR Passport for transit through Beijing, Shanghai, or Guangzhou within 24 hours without leaving the sterile area of the airports.
Hong Kong	Visa not required	Visa free for a period of 180 days for holders of Macau Permanent Resident Identity Cards. Visa free for 7 days for passengers in transit to a third country holding MSAR passports.
Taiwan	Entry permit on arrival or Online entry permit	Entry Permit on arrival for NT$300. Free online registration prior to arrival is also available. Applicable to those who were born in Hong Kong or Macau, or those who have previously entered Taiwan at least once as a permanent resident of Macau. Not applicable to MSAR passport holders with nationality or citizenship of another country. Permit not required for transiting through Taoyuan Airport without leaving the sterile area within 24 hours.
Taiwan	Not eligible for Hong Kong/Macau residents entry scheme if in possession of passports other than the Hong Kong passport, the Macao passport or the British National (Overseas) passport.	Must enter using a third-country passport and is subject to the entry requirements applicable to that nationality, unless proof of renunciation of the third-country nationality is provided.

== Visa requirements ==
Country	Visa requirement	Allowed stay	Notes (excluding departure fees)
Afghanistan	Visa required		
Albania	Visa not required	90 days	
Algeria	Visa required		
Andorra	Visa not required		
Angola	Visa not required	30 days	
Antigua and Barbuda	Visa not required	30 days	
Argentina	Visa not required	30 days	
Armenia	Visa not required	180 days	180 days in a year.
Australia	Visa required		May apply online (Online Visitor e600 visa).
Austria	Visa not required	90 days	90 days within any 180 day period in the Schengen Area.
Azerbaijan	Visa not required	30 days	From 2 February 2026 to 2 February 2027, Macau passport holders can travel to Azerbaijan three times in a year without a visa and stay for up to 30 days at each entrance.
Bahamas	eVisa	3 months	
Bahrain	eVisa / Visa on arrival	2 weeks	
Bangladesh	Visa required		
Barbados	Visa not required	30 days	
Belarus	Visa not required	30 days	For a maximum total stay of 90 days within any 1 calendar year.
Belgium	Visa not required	90 days	90 days within any 180 day period in the Schengen Area.
Belize	Visa required		
Benin	eVisa	30 days	Must have an international vaccination certificate.
Bhutan	eVisa		
Bolivia	eVisa / Visa on arrival	30 days	
Bosnia and Herzegovina	Visa not required	90 days	90 days within any 6-month period.
Botswana	eVisa	3 months	
Brazil	Visa not required	90 days	
Brunei	Visa not required	14 days	
Bulgaria	Visa not required	90 days	90 days within any 180 day period in the Schengen Area.
Burkina Faso	eVisa		
Burundi	Visa on arrival	1 month	
Cambodia	eVisa / Visa on arrival	30 days	
Cameroon	eVisa		
Canada	Visa required		Macau citizens who do receive a visa are normally issued with multiple-entry combination visitor visas (Generally, the validity period is until the passport expiration date, and the maximum period is 10 years), and each entry can stay for a maximum of 6 months (the period of stay is subject to the border immigration officer).
Cape Verde	Visa not required	90 days	
Central African Republic	Visa required		
Chad	Visa required		
Chile	Visa not required	30 days	
Mainland China	Home Return Permit travel (Freedom of movement)	Until permit expiry	Holders of Mainland Travel Permit for Hong Kong and Macao Residents are able to freely enter mainland China for all purposes within the validity of their travel document. Most permits for adults are valid for 10 years; minors under 18 years old are issued permits valid for five years.; Entry to Mainland China cannot be on a Macau SAR passport. However, all eligible for Macau SAR passport is also able to apply for a Home Return Permit, allowing the holder to enter and stay in mainland China until its expiry. Issuance of the Home Return Permit is not automatic for all MSAR passport holders and is at the sole discretion of the Bureau of Exit and Entry Administration of the Ministry of Public Security.; Those residing in the Mainland for more than six months may apply for the Residence Permit for Hong Kong, Macao, and Taiwan Residents.; Home Return Permit not required for MSAR Passport holders when transiting through Beijing, Shanghai or Guangzhou Airports within 24 hours without leaving the sterile area.
Colombia	eVisa		
Comoros	Visa on arrival	45 days	
Republic of the Congo	Visa required		
Democratic Republic of the Congo	eVisa	7 days	
Costa Rica	Visa required		
Côte d'Ivoire	eVisa	3 months	e-Visa holders must arrive via Port Bouet Airport.
Croatia	Visa not required	90 days	90 days within any 180 day period in the Schengen Area.
Cuba	Tourist card required	90 days	Can be extended up to 90 days with a fee.
Cyprus	Visa not required	90 days	90 days within any 180 day period.
Czech Republic	Visa not required	90 days	90 days within any 180 day period in the Schengen Area.
Denmark	Visa not required	90 days	90 days within any 180 day period in the Schengen Area.
Djibouti	eVisa	90 days	
Dominica	Visa not required	180 days	
Dominican Republic	Visa not required	90 days	
Ecuador	Visa not required	90 days	
Egypt	Visa not required	3 months	
El Salvador	Visa required		
Equatorial Guinea	eVisa		
Eritrea	Visa required		
Estonia	Visa not required	90 days	90 days within any 180 day period in the Schengen Area.
Eswatini	Visa required		
Ethiopia	eVisa	up to 90 days	Visa on arrival is obtainable only at Addis Ababa Bole International Airport.; e-Visa holders must arrive via Addis Ababa Bole International Airport.; e-Visa is available for 30 or 90 days.
Fiji	Visa not required	4 months	
Finland	Visa not required	90 days	90 days within any 180 day period in the Schengen Area.
France	Visa not required	90 days	90 days within any 180 day period in the Schengen Area.
Gabon	eVisa	90 days	e-Visa holders must arrive via Libreville International Airport.
Gambia	Visa required		
Georgia	Visa not required	30 days	
Germany	Visa not required	90 days	90 days within any 180 day period in the Schengen Area.
Ghana	Visa required		
Greece	Visa not required	90 days	90 days within any 180 day period in the Schengen Area.
Grenada	Visa not required	3 months	
Guatemala	Visa required		
Guinea	eVisa	90 days	
Guinea-Bissau	Visa on arrival	90 days	
Guyana	Visa required		
Haiti	Visa not required	3 months	
Honduras	Visa required		No visa required if holding valid visa of US, Canada, or Schengen member state.
Hungary	Visa not required	90 days	90 days within any 180 day period in the Schengen Area.
Iceland	Visa not required	90 days	90 days within any 180 day period in the Schengen Area.
India	Visa required		
Indonesia	Visa not required	30 days	
Iran	Visa not required	21 days	
Iraq	Visa required		
Ireland	Visa not required	3 months	
Israel	Visa not required	90 days	Entry refused by certain Muslim countries due to Arab league boycott of Israel if evidence of travel to Israel.
Italy	Visa not required	90 days	90 days within any 180 day period in the Schengen Area.
Jamaica	Visa not required	30 days	
Japan	Visa not required	90 days	
Jordan	eVisa / Visa on arrival	90 days	
Kazakhstan	Visa not required	14 days	
Kenya	Electronic Travel Authorisation	90 days	Applications can be submitted up to 90 days prior to travel and must be submitted at least 3 days in advance.; eTA fee is 32.50 USD.; Proof of reservation at the hotel where visitors plan to stay is required (if staying with friends, an invitation letter is also acceptable).; Yellow fever vaccination certificate is required if coming from endemic countries.
Kiribati	Visa not required	30 days	
North Korea	Visa required		
South Korea	Electronical Travel Authorization	90 days	The validity period of a K-ETA is 3 years from the date of approval.
Kuwait	Visa required		
Kyrgyzstan	Visa not required	30 days	e-Visa holders must arrive via Manas International Airport or Osh Airport or through land crossings with China (at Irkeshtam and Torugart), Kazakhstan (at Ak-jol, Ak-Tilek, Chaldybar, Chon-Kapka), Tajikistan (at Bor-Dobo, Kulundu, Kyzyl-Bel) and Uzbekistan (at Dostuk).
Laos	eVisa / Visa on arrival	30 days	18 (Note: Savannakhet Airport; Lanetoui - Mengkang (China); Meuangmom - Wan Pong (Myanmar); Banvang - Ban Khok Phai (Thailand); Namngeun - Huay Kon (Thailand); Paksan - Bueng Kan (Thailand); Paktaphan - Pak Saeng (Thailand); Pangmon - Ban Huak (Thailand); Phoudou (Thailand); Dak ta ock - Nam Giang (Vietnam); La Lai (Vietnam); Namkan (Vietnam); Namphao - Cau Treo (Vietnam); Namsoy - Na Meo (Vietnam); Naphao - Cha Lo (Vietnam); Pahang - Long Sap (Vietnam); Panghok - Tây Trang (Vietnam); Phoukeua - Bo Y (Vietnam)) of the 33 border crossings are only open to regular visa holders.; e-Visa may be used to enter Laos through the Luang Prabang, Pakse and Vientiane international airports, 3 Thai-Lao Friendship Bridges (Note: Vientiane (Friendship Bridge 1); Savannakhet (Friendship Bridge 2); Bokeo (Friendship Bridge 4)), in Boten (road and railroad), and in Vientiane (at Khamsavath railway station).; Visa on arrival is available at the Luang Prabang, Pakse and Vientiane international airports, 4 Thai-Lao Friendship Bridges (Note: Vientiane (Friendship Bridge 1); Savannakhet (Friendship Bridge 2); Khammouane (Friendship Bridge 3); Bokeo (Friendship Bridge 4)) and 7 border crossings. (Note: Nongnokkheane - Trapeang Kriel (Cambodia); Boten - Bo han (China); Golden Triangle/Samliemkham (Thailand); Khamsavath railway station (Thailand); Namheuang - Ban Na Kraseng (Thailand); Vang tao - Chongmek (Thailand); Dansavan - Lao Bảo (Vietnam))
Latvia	Visa not required	90 days	90 days within any 180 day period in the Schengen Area.
Lebanon	Free visa on arrival	1 month	1 month extendable for 2 additional months.; Granted free of charge at Beirut International Airport or any other port of entry if there is no Israeli visa or seal, holding a telephone number, an address in Lebanon, and a non refundable return or circle trip ticket.
Lesotho	eVisa		
Liberia	Visa required		
Libya	eVisa		
Liechtenstein	Visa not required	90 days	90 days within any 180 day period in the Schengen Area.
Lithuania	Visa not required	90 days	90 days within any 180 day period in the Schengen Area.
Luxembourg	Visa not required	90 days	90 days within any 180 day period in the Schengen Area.
Madagascar	Visa on arrival	60 days	
Malawi	eVisa / Visa on arrival	90 days	
Malaysia	Visa not required	30 days	
Maldives	Free visa on arrival	30 days	
Mali	Visa not required	90 days	
Malta	Visa not required	90 days	90 days within any 180 day period in the Schengen Area.
Marshall Islands	Visa required		
Mauritania	Visa on arrival		Available at Nouakchott–Oumtounsy International Airport.
Mauritius	Visa not required	90 days	
Mexico	Visa not required	180 days	
Micronesia	Visa not required	30 days	
Moldova	Visa not required	90 days	90 days within any 180 day period.
Monaco	Visa not required		
Mongolia	Visa not required	30 days	
Montenegro	Visa not required	90 days	
Morocco	Visa not required	90 days	
Mozambique	eVisa / Visa on arrival	30 days	
Myanmar	eVisa/ Visa on arrival	28 days/30 days	e-Visa holders must arrive via Yangon, Nay Pyi Taw or Mandalay airports or via land border crossings at Tachileik, Myawaddy, Kawthaung, Rih Khaw Dar or Tamu.; e-Visa available for both tourism (allowed stay is 28 days) or business (allowed stay is 70 days) purposes.
Namibia	Visa not required	3 months	
Nauru	Visa required		
Nepal	Online Visa / Visa on arrival	90 days	
Netherlands	Visa not required	90 days	90 days within any 180 day period in the Schengen Area.
New Zealand	Electronic Travel Authority	3 months	International Visitor Conservation and Tourism Levy must be paid upon requesting an Electronic Travel Authority.; Holders of an Australian Permanent Resident Visa or Resident Return Visa may be granted a New Zealand Resident Visa on arrival permitting indefinite stay (pursuant to the Trans-Tasman Travel Arrangement), subject to meeting character requirements and obtaining an Electronic Travel Authority prior to departure. Such travellers are not required to pay the International Visitor Conservation and Tourism Levy.
Nicaragua	Visa not required	90 days	
Niger	Visa required		
Nigeria	eVisa	90 days	
North Macedonia	Visa not required	90 days	
Norway	Visa not required	90 days	90 days within any 180 day period in the Schengen Area.
Oman	Visa not required	14 days	
Pakistan	Visa required		
Palau	Free visa on arrival	30 days	
Panama	Visa required		
Papua New Guinea	eVisa	60 days	Must arrive through Port Moresby (POM) or Rabaul (RAB) airports.
Paraguay	Visa required		
Peru	Visa required		
Philippines	Visa not required	14 days	
Poland	Visa not required	90 days	90 days within any 180 day period in the Schengen Area.
Portugal	Visa not required	90 days	90 days within any 180 day period in the Schengen Area.
Qatar	eVisa / Visa on arrival	30 days	
Romania	Visa not required	90 days	90 days within any 180 day period in the Schengen Area.
Russia	Visa not required	30 days	For a maximum total stay of 90 days within one calendar year period
Rwanda	eVisa / Visa on arrival	30 days	
Saint Kitts and Nevis	Visa not required		
Saint Lucia	Visa on arrival	6 weeks	
Saint Vincent and the Grenadines	Visa not required	30 days	
Samoa	Visa not required	60 days	
San Marino	Visa not required		
São Tomé and Príncipe	eVisa / Visa on arrival	15 days	
Saudi Arabia	eVisa / Visa on arrival	90 days	
Senegal	Visa required		
Serbia	Visa not required	90 days	90 days within any 180 day period.
Seychelles	Visa not required	30 days	
Sierra Leone	eVisa / Visa on arrival	30 days	
Singapore	Visa not required	30 days	
Slovakia	Visa not required	90 days	90 days within any 180 day period in the Schengen Area.
Slovenia	Visa not required	90 days	90 days within any 180 day period in the Schengen Area.
Solomon Islands	Visa required		
Somalia	Visa on arrival	30 days	All visitors must have an approved Electronic Visa (eTAS) before the start of their journey.
South Africa	Visa not required	30 days	
South Sudan	eVisa		Obtainable online.; Printed visa authorization must be presented at the time of travel.
Spain	Visa not required	90 days	90 days within any 180 day period in the Schengen Area.
Sri Lanka	eVisa / Visa on arrival	60 days / 30 days	Citizens of Macau would need to select People's Republic of China (Special Administrative Region of China) as their nationality while applying for the e-Visa.; Sri Lanka introduced an ETA valid for 30 days.
Sudan	Visa required		
Suriname	Visa not required	90 days	An entrance fee of USD 50 or EUR 50 must be paid online prior to arrival.; Multiple entry e-Visa is also available.
Sweden	Visa not required	90 days	90 days within any 180 day period in the Schengen Area.
Switzerland	Visa not required	90 days	90 days within any 180 day period in the Schengen Area.
Syria	Visa required		
Tajikistan	eVisa	60 days	
Tanzania	Visa not required	90 days	
Thailand	Visa not required	60 days	
Timor-Leste	Visa on arrival	30 days	
Togo	eVisa	15 days	
Tonga	Free visa on arrival	31 days	
Trinidad and Tobago	Visa required		
Tunisia	Visa required		Visa not required for tourist groups organised by a travel agency.
Turkey	Visa not required	30 days	
Turkmenistan	Visa required		
Tuvalu	Visa on arrival	1 month	
Uganda	eVisa	30 days	
Ukraine	Visa required		e-Visa (30 days) is currently suspended due to the 2022 Russian Invasion of Ukraine.
United Arab Emirates	Visa not required	30 days	
United Kingdom	Visa not required	6 months	
United States	Visa required		Macau citizens who do receive a visa are normally issued with 10-years multiple-entry combination B1 / B2 visas, and each entry can stay for a maximum of 6 months (the period of stay is subject to the border immigration officer).
Uruguay	Visa not required	90 days	
Uzbekistan	Visa not required	10 days	Must arrive by air. Otherwise an electronic visa is available.
Vanuatu	Visa not required	30 days	
Vatican City	Visa not required		
Venezuela	Visa required		
Vietnam	eVisa	90 days	
Yemen	Visa required		
Zambia	eVisa	90 days	
Zimbabwe	Visa on arrival	30 days	

== Territories ==
Visa requirements for Chinese citizens of Macau for visits to various territories, disputed areas, partially recognised countries and restricted zones:

Visitor to	Visa requirement	Notes (excluding departure fees)
Europe
Abkhazia	Permit required	Below are the requirements for receiving an entry permit to the Republic of Abkhazia: Copy of passport (sent by e-mail or by fax). Please make sure that your passport is valid for at least 6 months after your planned entry to Abkhazia. Filled electronic application. You should complete all sections of the application. If any necessary information is missing, the application will not be considered. An entry permit letter for visiting the Republic of Abkhazia will be sent to the email address from which the application was sent or to the fax number stated in the application. Upon arrival nationals of Macau must visit the Consular Service within three working days in order to receive the visa of the Republic of Abkhazia.
Mount Athos	Special permit required	Special permit required (4 days: 25 euro for Orthodox visitors, 35 euro for non-Orthodox visitors, 18 euro for students). There is a visitors' quota: maximum 100 Orthodox and 10 non-Orthodox per day and women are not allowed.
Turkish Republic of Northern Cyprus	Visa not required	3 months
(United Nations) UN Buffer Zone in Cyprus	Access Permit required	Access Permit is required for travelling inside the zone, except Civil Use Areas.
Faroe Islands	Visa not required	
Gibraltar	Visa not required	
Guernsey	Visa not required	
Isle of Man	Visa not required	
(Norway) Jan Mayen	Permit required	Permit issued by the local police required for staying for less than 24 hours and permit issued by the Norwegian police for staying for more than 24 hours.
Jersey	Visa not required	
Kosovo	Visa not required	90 days
Russia	Special authorisation required	Several closed cities and regions in Russia require special authorisation.
South Ossetia	Visa not required	Multiple entry visa to Russia and three-day prior notification are required to enter South Ossetia.
Transnistria	Visa not required	Registration required after 24h.
Africa
British Indian Ocean Territory	Special permit required	Special permit required.
Eritrea outside Asmara	Travel permit required	To travel in the rest of the country, a Travel Permit for Foreigners is required (20 Eritrean nakfa).
Mayotte	Visa not required	90 days
Réunion	Visa not required	90 days
Ascension Island	Admission refused	From May 2015, the Ascension Island Government does not issue entry visas including eVisas to Chinese citizens of Macau.
Saint Helena	Visitor's Pass required	Visitor's Pass granted on arrival valid for 4/10/21/60/90 days for 12/14/16/20/25 pound sterling.
Tristan da Cunha	Permission required	Permission to land required for 15/30 pounds sterling (yacht/ship passenger) for Tristan da Cunha Island or 20 pounds sterling for Gough Island, Inaccessible Island or Nightingale Islands.
Somaliland	Visa on arrival	30 days for 30 US dollars, payable on arrival.
Sudan	Travel permit required	All foreigners travelling more than 25 kilometres outside of Khartoum must obtain a travel permit.
(Sudan) Darfur	Travel permit required	Separate travel permit is required.
Asia
India PAP/RAP	PAP/RAP required	Protected Area Permit (PAP) required for all of Arunachal Pradesh, Manipur, Mizoram and parts of Himachal Pradesh, Jammu and Kashmir and Uttarakhand. Restricted Area Permit (RAP) required for all of Andaman and Nicobar Islands and Lakshadweep and parts of Sikkim. Some of these requirements are occasionally lifted for a year.
Kazakhstan	Special permission required	Special permission required for the town of Baikonur and surrounding areas in Kyzylorda Oblast, and the town of Gvardeyskiy near Almaty.
(Iran) Kish Island	Visa not required	14 days; Visitors to Kish Island do not require a visa.
Malaysia: Sabah and Sarawak	Visa not required	These states have their own immigration authorities and passport is required to travel to them, however the same visa applies.
Maldives	Permission required	With the exception of the capital Malé, tourists are generally prohibited from visiting non-resort islands without the express permission of the Government of Maldives.
Palestine	Visa not required	Arrival by sea to Gaza Strip not allowed.
(Tajikistan) Gorno-Badakhshan Autonomous Province	OIVR permit required	OIVR permit required (15+5 Tajikistani Somoni) and another special permit (free of charge) is required for Lake Sarez.
(United Nations) Korean Demilitarized Zone	Restricted zone	
(United Nations) UNDOF Zone and Ghajar	Restricted zone	
Yemen	Special permission required	Special permission needed for travel outside Sana'a or Aden.
Caribbean and North Atlantic
Anguilla	Visa not required	3 months
Aruba	Visa not required	30 days
Bermuda	Visa required	
(Netherlands) Bonaire, St. Eustatius and Saba	Visa not required	30 days
British Virgin Islands	Visa not required	30 days
Cayman Islands	Visa required	
Curacao	Visa not required	30 days
(France) French Guiana	Visa not required	90 days
(France) French West Indies	Visa not required	French West Indies refers to Martinique, Guadeloupe, Saint Martin and Saint Barthélemy.
Greenland	Visa not required	90 days
Montserrat	Visa not required	90 days
Puerto Rico	Visa required	
Saint Pierre and Miquelon	Visa not required	90 days
Sint Maarten	Visa not required	3 months
Turks and Caicos Islands	Visa required	
U.S. Virgin Islands	Visa required	
Oceania
American Samoa	Visa required	
(Australia) Ashmore and Cartier Islands	Special authorisation required	Special authorisation required.
(France) Clipperton Island	Special permit required	Special permit required.
Cook Islands	Visa not required	31 days
(Fiji) Lau Province	Special permission required	Special permission required.
French Polynesia	Visa not required	90 days
Guam	Visa required	
New Caledonia	Visa not required	90 days
Northern Mariana Islands	Visa required	
Niue	Visa not required	30 days
Pitcairn Islands	Visa not required	14 days visa free and landing fee US$35 or tax of US$5 if not going ashore.
United States Minor Outlying Islands	Special permits required	Special permits required for Baker Island, Howland Island, Jarvis Island, Johnston Atoll, Kingman Reef, Midway Atoll, Palmyra Atoll and Wake Island.
Wallis and Futuna	Visa not required	90 days
South America
Galápagos	Pre-registration required	Online pre-registration is required. Transit Control Card must also be obtained at the airport prior to departure.
South Atlantic and Antarctica
Falkland Islands	Visa required	
French Southern and Antarctic Lands	Visa not required	90 days(excludes Adélie Land)
South Georgia and the South Sandwich Islands	Permit required	Pre-arrival permit from the Commissioner required (72 hours/1 month for 110/160 pounds sterling).
Special permits required for Bouvet Island, British Antarctic Territory, French Southern and Antarctic Lands, Argentine Antarctica, (Australia) Australian Antarctic Territory, (Antártica Chilena Province) Chilean Antarctic Territory, (Australia) Heard Island and McDonald Islands, (Norway) Peter I Island, (Norway) Queen Maud Land, (New Zealand) Ross Dependency.

== Timeline of visa-free access ==
Visa requirements were lifted for Portuguese Macau (unilaterally or bilaterally) by the Philippines on 22 June 1994.

Visa requirements were lifted for Chinese citizens of Macau by the Czech Republic on 1 October 2001, Russia on 30 September 2012, New Zealand on 30 June 2014 and Belarus on 27 November 2016.

== Non-visa restrictions ==
=== Blank passport pages ===
Many countries require a minimum number of blank pages to be available in the passport being presented, typically one or two pages. Endorsement pages, which often appear after the visa pages, are not counted as being valid or available.

=== Vaccination ===
Cover of the new International Certificate of Vaccination issued by the Bureau of Quarantine in the Philippines since 2021

The African countries of Angola, Benin, Burkina Faso, Burundi, Cameroon, Central African Republic, Democratic Republic of the Congo, Republic of the Congo, Côte d'Ivoire, Gabon, Ghana, Guinea-Bissau, Mali, Niger, Sierra Leone and Togo, South Sudan and Uganda, along with French Guiana in South America, require all incoming passengers older than nine months to one year, to have a current International Certificate of Vaccination or Prophylaxis.

Some other countries require vaccination only if the passenger is coming from an infected area or has visited one recently or has transited for 12 hours in those countries: Algeria, Botswana, Cabo Verde, Chad, Djibouti, Egypt, Eswatini, Ethiopia, Gambia, Ghana, Guinea, Lesotho, Libya, Equatorial Guinea, Eritrea, Madagascar, Malawi, Mauritania, Mauritius, Mozambique, Namibia, Nigeria, Papua New Guinea, Seychelles, Somalia, South Africa, Sudan, Tunisia, Uganda, Tanzania, Zambia and Zimbabwe.

=== Passport validity length ===
Very few countries, such as Paraguay, just require a valid passport on arrival.

However many countries and groupings now require only an identity card – especially from their neighbours. Other countries may have special bilateral arrangements that depart from the generality of their passport validity length policies to shorten the period of passport validity required for each other's citizens or even accept passports that have already expired (but not been cancelled).

Some countries, such as Japan, Ireland and the United Kingdom, require a passport valid throughout the period of the intended stay.

In the absence of specific bilateral agreements, countries requiring passports to be valid for at least 6 more months on arrival include Afghanistan, Algeria, Anguilla, Bahrain, Bhutan, Botswana, British Virgin Islands, Brunei, Cambodia, Cameroon, Cape Verde, Cayman Islands, Central African Republic, Chad, Comoros, Costa Rica, Côte d'Ivoire, Curaçao, Ecuador, Egypt, El Salvador, Equatorial Guinea, Fiji, Gabon, Guinea Bissau, Guyana, Haiti, India, Indonesia, Iran, Iraq, Israel, Jordan, Kenya, Kiribati, Kuwait, Laos, Madagascar, Malaysia, Marshall Islands, Mongolia, Myanmar, Namibia, Nepal, Nicaragua, Nigeria, Oman, Palau, Papua New Guinea, Peru, Philippines, Qatar, Rwanda, Samoa, Saudi Arabia, Singapore, Solomon Islands, Somalia, Sri Lanka, Sudan, Suriname, Tanzania, Thailand, Timor-Leste, Tokelau, Tonga, Turkey, Tuvalu, Uganda, United Arab Emirates, Vanuatu, Venezuela, and Vietnam.

Countries requiring passports valid for at least 4 months on arrival include Micronesia and Zambia.

Countries requiring passports with a validity of at least 3 months beyond the date of intended departure include Azerbaijan, Bosnia and Herzegovina, Honduras, Montenegro, Nauru, Moldova and New Zealand. Similarly, the EEA countries of Iceland, Liechtenstein, Norway, all European Union countries (except Ireland) together with Switzerland also require 3 months validity beyond the date of the bearer's intended departure unless the bearer is an EEA or Swiss national.

Countries requiring passports valid for at least 3 months on arrival include Albania, North Macedonia, Panama, and Senegal.

Bermuda requires passports to be valid for at least 45 days upon entry.

Countries that require a passport validity of at least one month beyond the date of intended departure include Eritrea, Hong Kong, Lebanon, Macau, the Maldives and South Africa.

==== Maximum passport age ====
Countries of the Schengen area require non-EU passports to be less than 10 years old upon entry.

=== Criminal record ===
Some countries, including Australia, Canada, Fiji, New Zealand and the United States, routinely deny entry to non-citizens who have a criminal record, while others impose restrictions depending on the type of conviction and the length of the sentence.

=== Persona non grata ===
The government of a country can declare a diplomat persona non grata, banning them from entering the country or expelling them if they have already entered. In non-diplomatic use, the authorities of a country may also declare a foreigner persona non grata permanently or temporarily, usually because of unlawful activity.

=== Israeli stamps ===
Kuwait, Lebanon, Libya, and Yemen do not allow entry to people with passport stamps from Israel or whose passports have either a used or an unused Israeli visa, or where there is evidence of previous travel to Israel such as entry or exit stamps from neighbouring border posts in transit countries such as Jordan and Egypt.

To circumvent this Arab League boycott of Israel, the Israeli immigration services have now mostly ceased to stamp foreign nationals' passports on either entry to or exit from Israel (unless the entry is for some work-related purposes). Since 15 January 2013, Israel no longer stamps foreign passports at Ben Gurion Airport. Passports are still (as of 22 June 2017) stamped at Erez when passing into and out of Gaza.

Iran refuses admission to holders of passports containing an Israeli visa or stamp that is less than 12 months old.

=== Biometrics ===
Several countries mandate that all travellers, or all foreign travellers, be fingerprinted on arrival and will refuse admission to or even arrest travellers who refuse to comply. In some countries, such as the United States, this may apply even to transit passengers who merely wish to change planes rather than go landside.

Fingerprinting countries/regions include Afghanistan, Argentina, Brunei, Cambodia, China, Ethiopia, Ghana, Guinea, India, Japan, Kenya (both fingerprints and a photo are taken), Malaysia upon entry and departure, Mongolia, Saudi Arabia, the Schengen Area, Singapore, South Korea, Taiwan, Thailand, Uganda, the United Arab Emirates and the United States.

Many countries also require a photo be taken of people entering the country. The United States, which does not fully implement exit control formalities at its land frontiers (although long mandated by its own legislation), intends to implement facial recognition for passengers departing from international airports to identify people who overstay their visa.

Together with fingerprint and face recognition, iris scanning is one of three biometric identification technologies internationally standardised since 2006 by the International Civil Aviation Organization (ICAO) for use in e-passports and the United Arab Emirates conducts iris scanning on visitors who need to apply for a visa. The United States Department of Homeland Security has announced plans to greatly increase the biometric data it collects at US borders. In 2018, Singapore began trials of iris scanning at three land and maritime immigration checkpoints.

== See also ==
- Visa policy of Macau
- Macau Special Administrative Region passport
- List of nationalities forbidden at border
