= Chinese Travel Document =

Permits Chinese citizens to travel internationally

People's Republic of China Travel Document
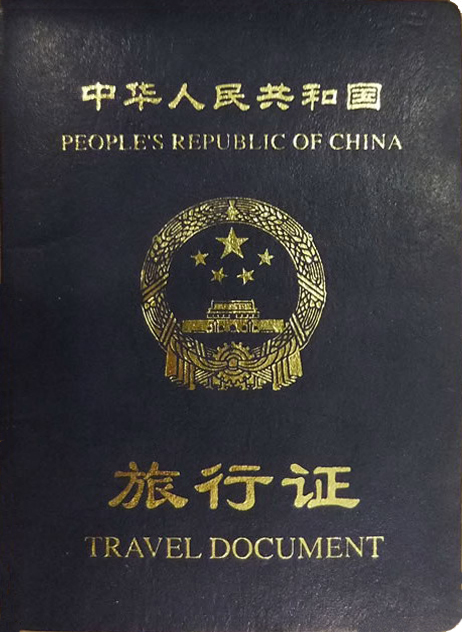
- Chinese Travel Document issued in 2010
- Type: Travel Document
- Issued by: China
- First issued: April 1990
- Purpose: Identification
- Valid in: International Travel
- Eligibility: Chinese citizenship
- Expiration: 2 years
- Cost: USD 18 or the equivalent in local currency

Chinese Travel Document
- Simplified Chinese: 中华人民共和国旅行证
- Traditional Chinese: 中華人民共和國旅行證
Transcriptions
Standard Mandarin
- Hanyu Pinyin: Zhōnghuá Rénmín Gònghéguó Lǚxíng Zhèng
Yue: Cantonese
- Jyutping: zung^{1} waa^{4} jan^{4} man^{4} gung^{6} wo^{4} gwok^{3} leoi^{5} hang^{4} zing^{3}

The People's Republic of China Travel Document (Chinese: 中华人民共和国旅行证) is a type of travel document issued by Chinese embassies, consulates, and other foreign offices to Chinese citizens for their international travel to China and other countries. The bearer of the Travel Document is legally a Chinese citizen in accordance with the Nationality Law.

== Eligibility ==
The People's Republic of China Travel Document is issued by the Chinese diplomatic representative offices, consular offices and other foreign offices to the following persons:

- Residents of Hong Kong, Macao and Taiwan with Chinese citizenship who do not hold the Mainland Travel Permit for Hong Kong and Macau Residents or the Mainland Travel Permit for Taiwan Residents and need to return to the Mainland;
- Taiwanese residents, with Chinese citizenship, who cannot apply for foreign visas with Taiwanese travel documents;
- Chinese citizens who are too late to apply for passports due to emergencies.

Chinese nationals born abroad who also receive jus soli citizenship may apply for the Travel Document. They may instead directly apply for Chinese passports if their countries of birth do not offer birthright citizenship or they are not otherwise citizens of their country of birth at birth.

== Types ==
The Travel Document is available in two formats: single entry for one year, and valid for multiple entries for two years. The former type only allows the bearer to enter and exit China once; the latter can travel to and from China multiple times within two years. If the bearer acquires a visa to a third country, they may travel to the third country. If the single-entry Travel Document is marked with "Valid for return to home country only" (仅限回国有效), the Travel Document will be invalid after the bearer returns. They may not be extended.

== Application requirements ==
The applicant shall approach any of the Chinese embassies, consulates, and other foreign offices in person to file the application. The application fee is lowered to US$18 or the equivalent in local currency starting from July 1, 2019, in accordance to a new fee standard proved by the Ministry of Finance. Previously, starting on October 8, 2013, the application fee was $35 or the equivalent in local currency.

== Events ==
After Iraq invaded Kuwait in 1990, the Chinese Embassy in Iraq organized an emergency evacuation of mainland China, Taiwan, Hong Kong, and Macao personnel stranded in Iraq and Kuwait. The Iraqi government required the Chinese embassy to confirm the identity of these personnel. Because it was impossible for the Chinese embassy to stamp on the passports issued by Taiwan for confirmation, the Chinese embassy issued one-time People's Republic of China Travel Documents to these Taiwan residents and evacuated them to Jordan by land.

== Visa requirements for Chinese Travel Document Holders ==
Countries and territories	Entry rights	Notes
Maldives	Visa not required	30 days
Kazakhstan	Visa not required	30 days, the maximum stay is limited to 90 days within every 180-day period.
Macau	Visa not required	7 days for transit with a flight ticket to and entry visa of another country.
Singapore	Visa required	4 days for transit, passengers must have a valid onward ticket departing Singapore within 96 hours and have a valid visa or long-term pass issued by Australia, Canada, Germany, Japan, New Zealand, Switzerland, United Kingdom and the United States of America.

== See also ==
- Chinese passport
- Hong Kong Special Administrative Region passport
- Macao Special Administrative Region passport
- Travel document
- Taiwan passport
