= Border control =

Measures taken to regulate the movement of goods and people across borders

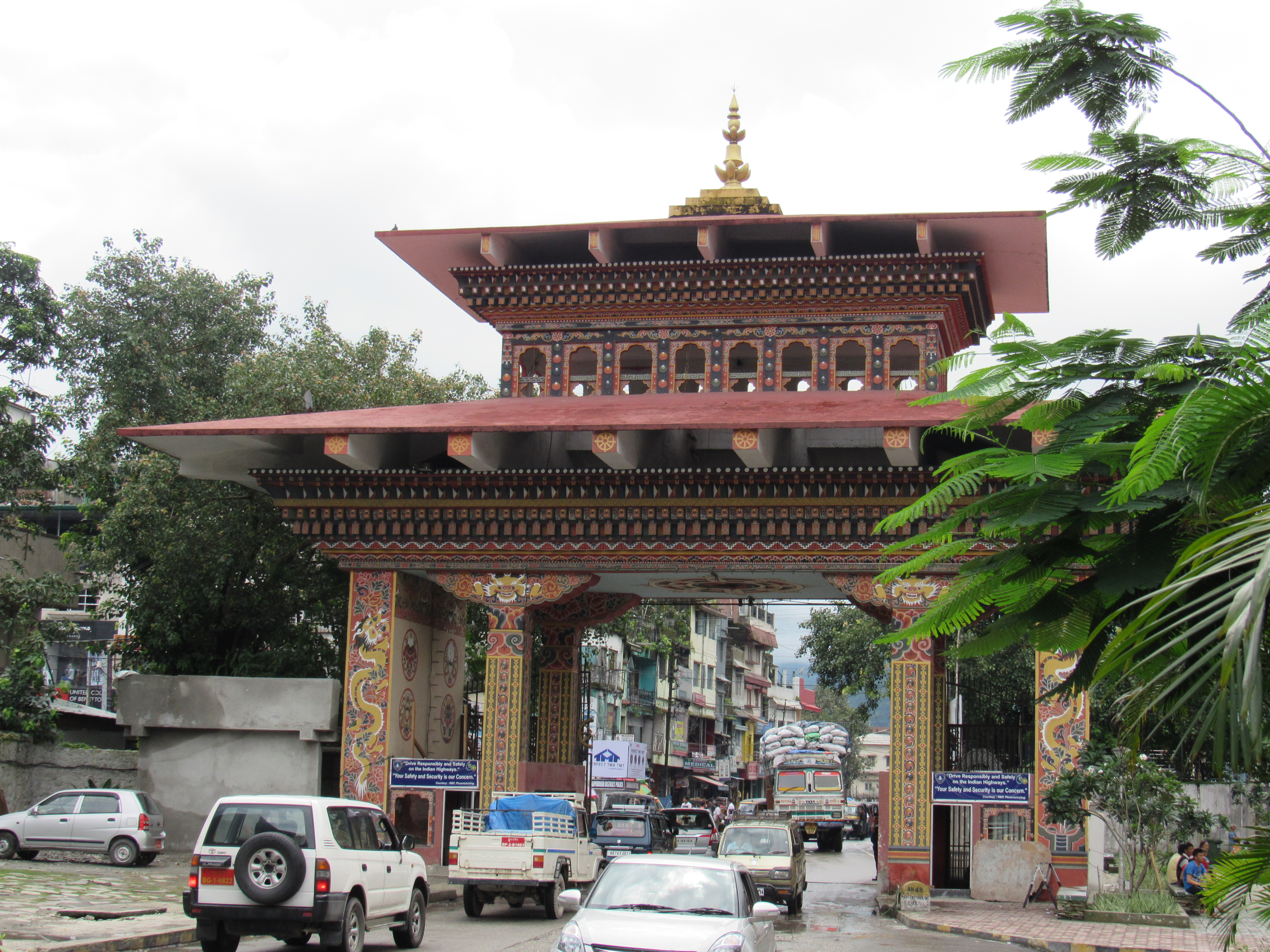
As seen from the Bhutanese side

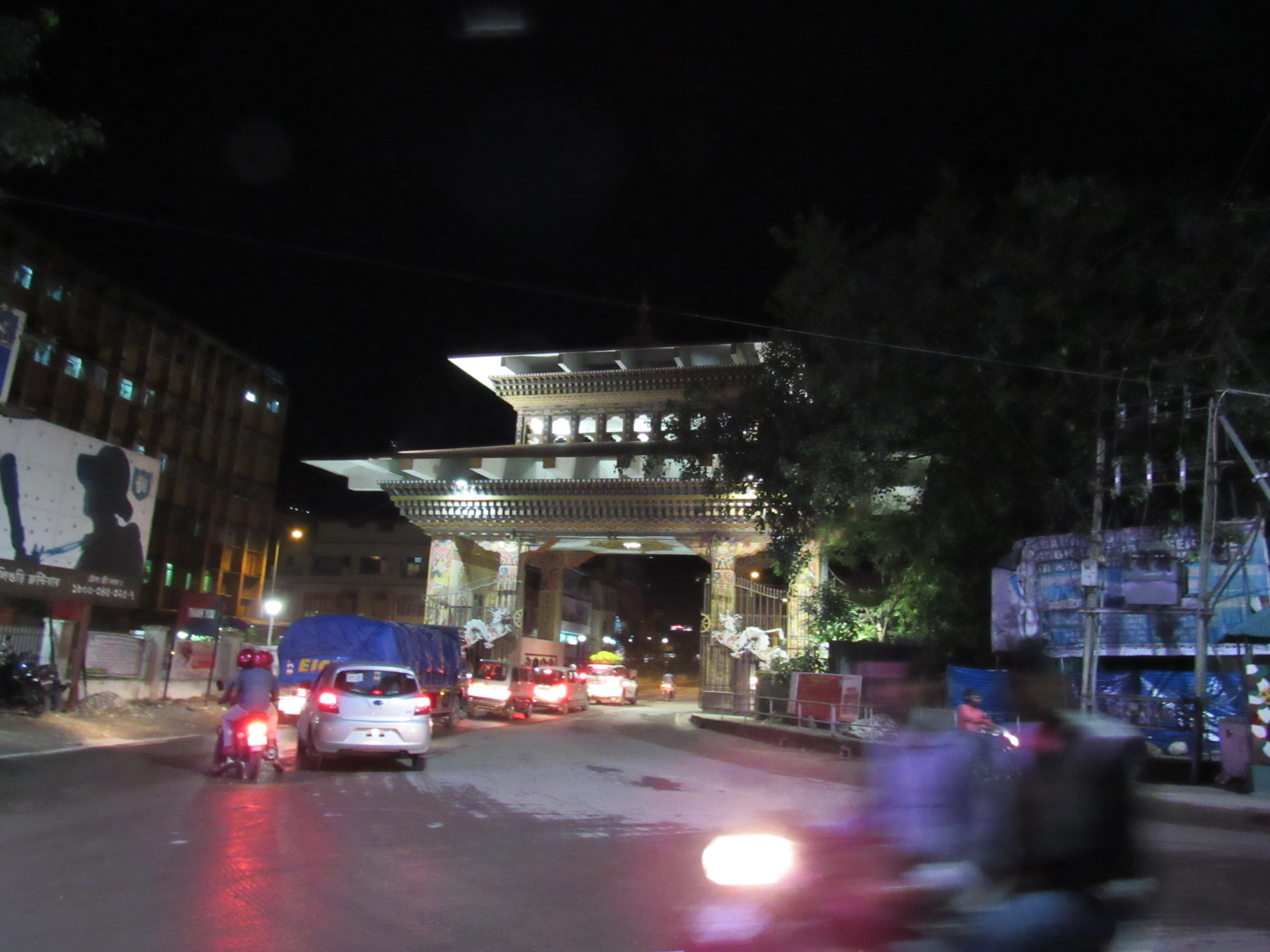
As seen from the Indian side

The border gate between Phuentsholing, Bhutan, and Jaigaon, India

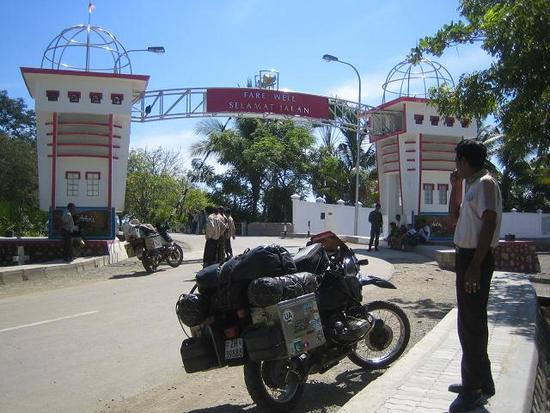
The gate that borders East Nusa Tenggara in Indonesia and East Timor

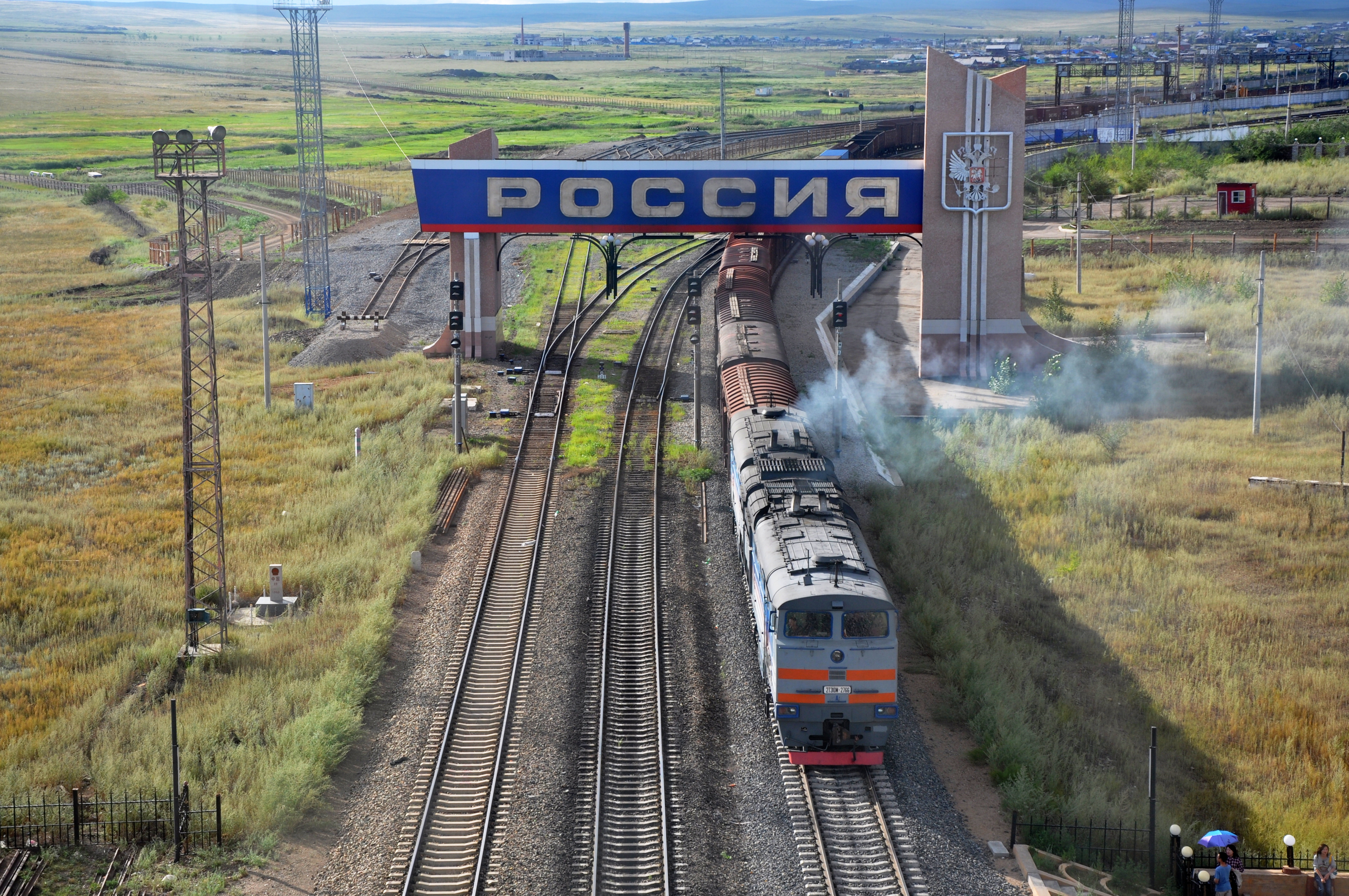
A train crossing the China–Russia border, travelling from Zabaykalsk in Russia to Manzhouli in China

Different categories of borders have varying features and levels of security.

Border control comprises measures taken by governments to monitor and regulate the movement of people, animals, and goods across land, air, and maritime borders. While border control is typically associated with international borders, it also encompasses controls imposed on internal borders within a single state.

Border control measures serve a variety of purposes, ranging from enforcing customs, sanitary and phytosanitary, or biosecurity regulations to restricting migration. While some borders (including most states' internal borders and international borders within the Schengen Area) are open and completely unguarded, others (including the vast majority of borders between countries as well as some internal borders) are subject to some degree of control and may be crossed legally only at designated checkpoints. Border controls in the 21st century are tightly intertwined with intricate systems of travel documents, visas, and increasingly complex policies that vary between countries.

Border controls have high human and economic costs, including tens of thousands of border deaths. According to one estimate, the indirect economic cost of border controls is many trillions of dollars, and the size of the global economy could double if migration restrictions were lifted.

== History ==
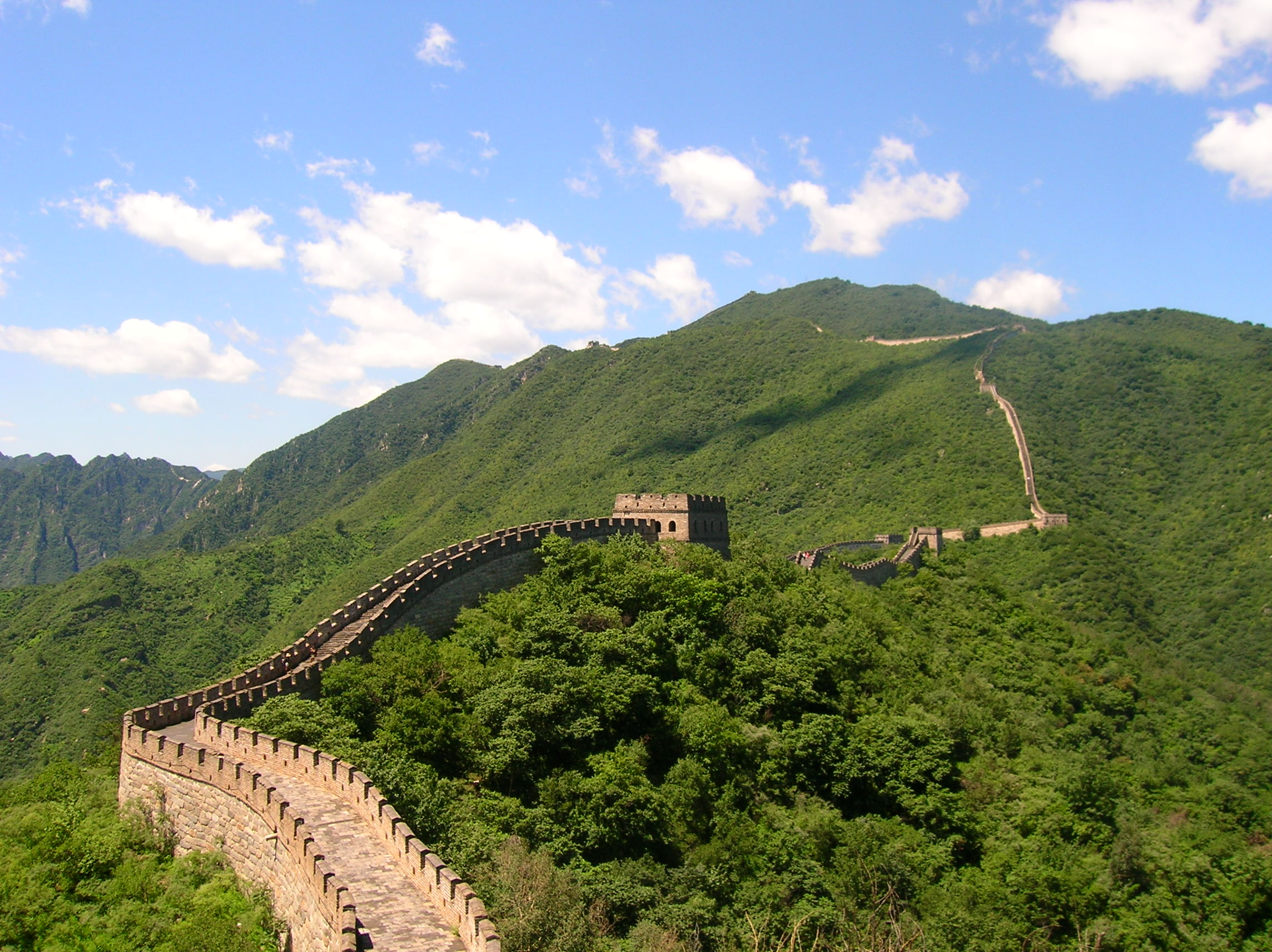
The purpose of the Great Wall of China was to stop the "barbarians" from crossing the northern border of China.

In medieval Europe, the boundaries between rival countries and centres of power were largely symbolic or consisted of amorphous borderlands, 'marches', and 'debatable lands' of indeterminate or contested status and the real 'borders' consisted of the fortified walls that surrounded towns and cities, where the authorities could exclude undesirable or incompatible people at the gates, from vagrants, beggars and the 'wandering poor', to 'masterless women', lepers, Romani, or Jews.

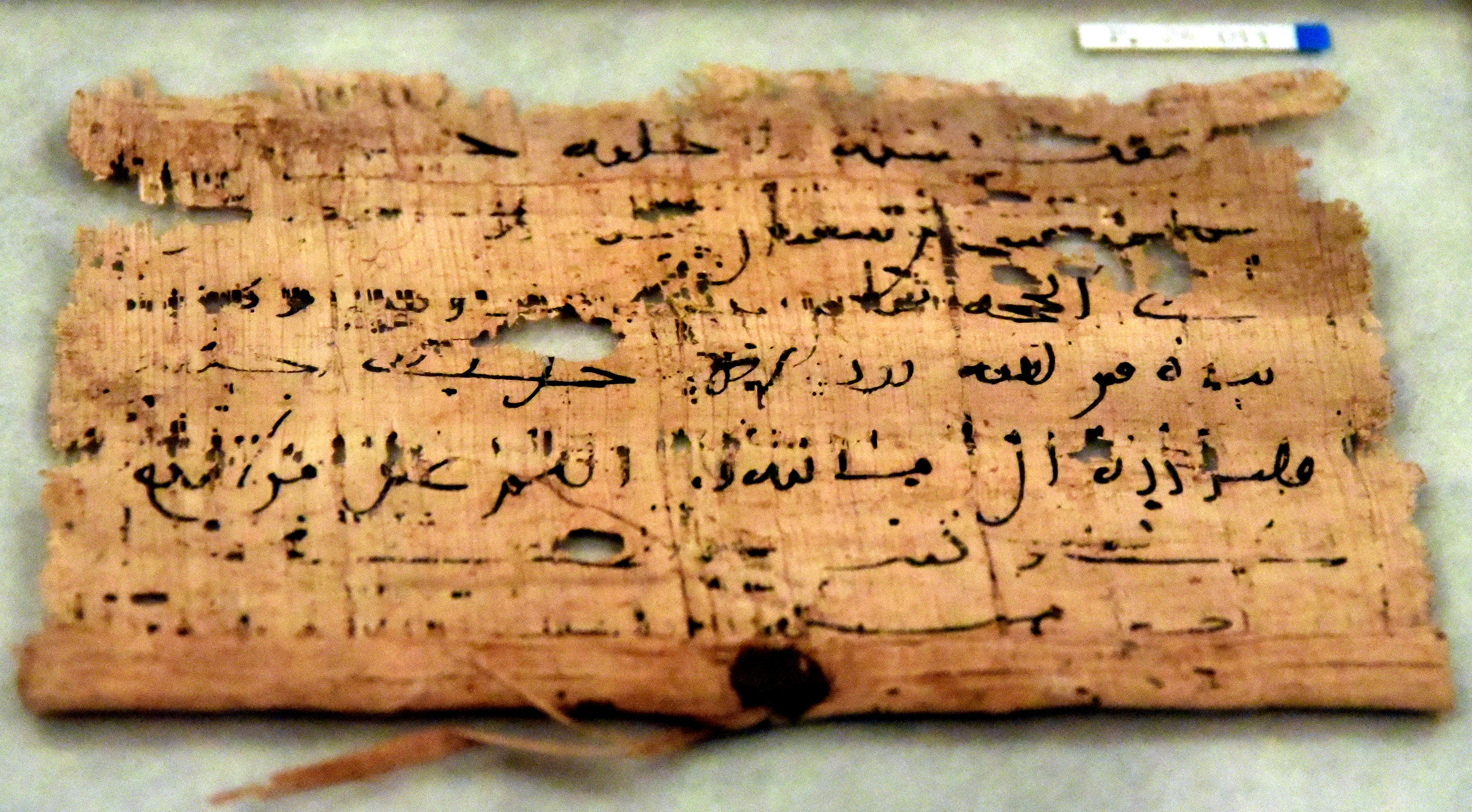
Arabic papyrus with an exit permit, dated 24 January 722 AD, pointing to the regulation of travel activities; from Hermopolis Magna, Egypt

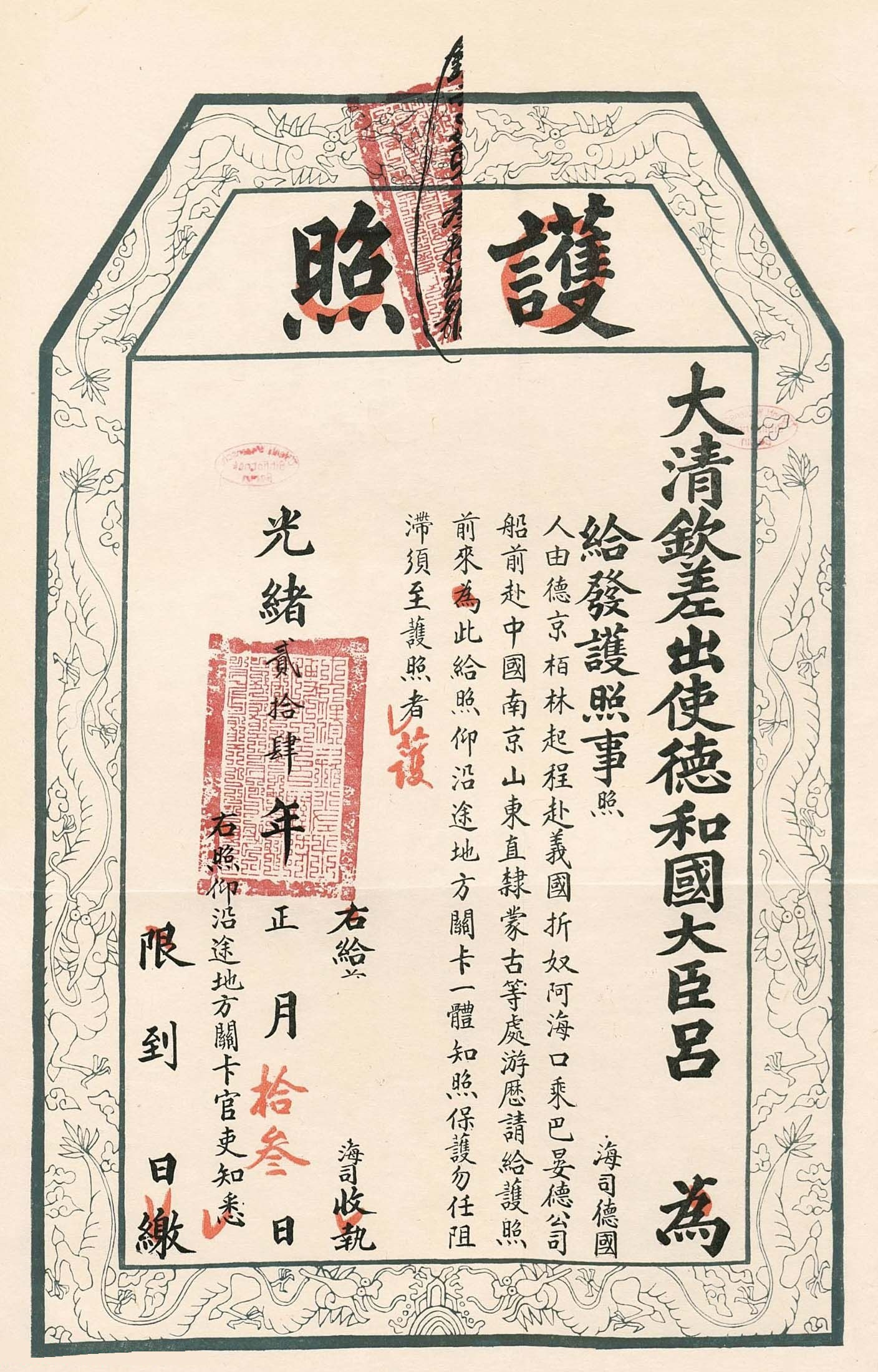
Chinese passport from the Qing dynasty, 24th Year of the Guangxu Reign, 1898

The concept of border controls has its origins in antiquity. In Asia, the existence of border controls is evidenced in classical texts. The Arthashastra (c. 3rd century BCE) makes mention of passes issued at the rate of one masha per pass to enter and exit the country. Chapter 34 of the Second Book of Arthashastra is concerned with the duties of the Mudrādhyakṣa (lit. 'Superintendent of Seals') who must issue sealed passes before a person could enter or leave the countryside. Passports resembling those issued today were an important part of the Chinese bureaucracy as early as the Western Han (202 BCE-220 CE), if not in the Qin dynasty. They required details such as age, height, and physical features. The passports (zhuan) determined a person's ability to move throughout imperial counties and through points of control. Even children needed passports, but those of one year or less who were in their mother's care may not have needed them.

=== Medieval period ===
In the Golden age of the Islamic Caliphate (medieval time in Europe), a form of passport was the bara'a, a receipt for taxes paid. Border controls were in place to ensure that only people who paid their zakah (for Muslims) or jizya (for dhimmis) taxes could travel freely between different regions of the Caliphate; thus, the bara'a receipt was a "basic passport".

In medieval Europe, passports were issued as early as the reign of Henry V of England to help his subjects prove who they were in foreign lands. The earliest reference to these documents is found in an act of Parliament, the Safe Conducts Act 1414 (2 Hen. 5. Stat. 1. c. 6). In 1540, granting travel documents in England became a role of the Privy Council of England, and it was around this time that the term "passport" was used. In 1794, issuing British passports became the job of the Office of the Secretary of State. The 1548 Imperial Diet of Augsburg required the public to hold imperial documents for travel, at the risk of permanent exile. During World War I, European governments introduced border passport requirements for security reasons, and to control the emigration of people with useful skills. These controls remained in place after the war, becoming a standard, though controversial, procedure. British tourists of the 1920s complained, especially about attached photographs and physical descriptions, which they considered led to a "nasty dehumanization".

Beginning in the mid-19th century, the Ottoman Empire established quarantine stations on many of its borders to control disease. For example, along the Greek-Turkish border, all travellers entering and exiting the Ottoman Empire would be quarantined for 9–15 days. Armed guards often manned the stations. If plague appeared, the Ottoman army would be deployed to enforce border control and monitor disease.

=== Modern history ===
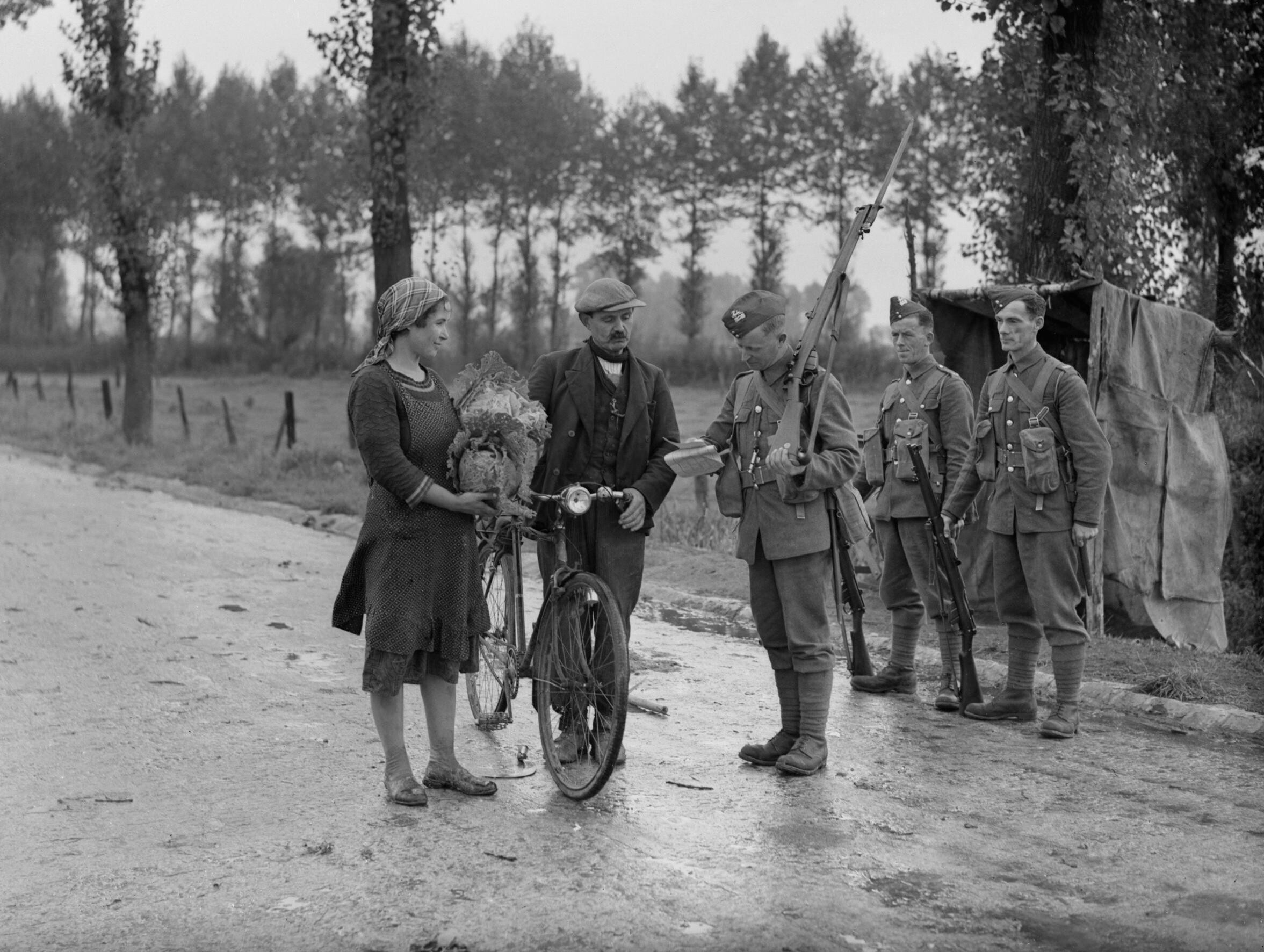
British troops checking the papers of civilians on the Franco-Belgian border, 10 October 1939

One of the earliest systematic attempts of modern nation-states to implement border controls to restrict the entry of particular groups was the policy adopted by Canada, Australia, and America to curtail the immigration of Asians in white settler states in the late 19th and early 20th centuries. The first anti-East Asian policy implemented in this era was the Chinese Exclusion Act of 1882 in America, which was followed by the Chinese Immigration Act of 1885 in Canada, which imposed what came to be called the Chinese head tax. These policies were a sign of injustice and unfair treatment to the Chinese workers because the jobs they engaged in were mostly menial. Similar policies were adopted in various British colonies in Australia over the latter half of the 19th century targeting Asian immigrants arriving as a result of the region's series of gold rushes as well as Kanakas (Pacific Islanders brought into Australia as indentured labourers) who alongside the Asians were perceived by trade unionists and White blue collar workers as a threat to the wages of White settlers. Following the establishment of the Commonwealth of Australia in 1901, these discriminatory border control measures quickly expanded into the White Australia Policy, while subsequent legislation in America (e.g. the Immigration Act of 1891, the Naturalisation Act of 1906, the Immigration Act of 1917, and the Immigration Act of 1924) resulted in an even stricter policy targeting immigrants from both Asia and parts of southern and eastern Europe.

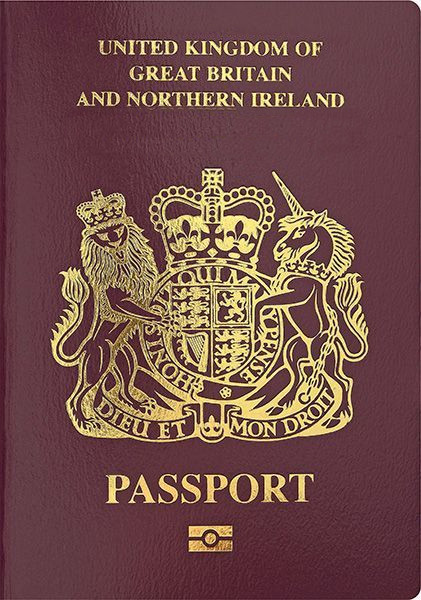
British Nationality (Overseas) or BN(O) passports sported a burgundy red cover, identical to that of the British Citizen passports, albeit without the words "European Union" text at the top part of the cover between 1990 and March 2020.

Even following the adoption of measures such as the White Australia Policy and the Chinese Exclusion Act in English-speaking settler colonies, pervasive control of international borders remained a relatively rare phenomenon until the early 20th century, before which many states had open international borders either in practice or due to a lack of any legal restriction. John Maynard Keynes identified World War I in particular as the point when such controls became commonplace.

Decolonisation during the twentieth century saw the emergence of mass emigration from nations in the Global South, thus leading former colonial occupiers to introduce stricter border controls. In the United Kingdom this process took place in stages, with British nationality law eventually shifting from recognising all Commonwealth citizens as British subjects to today's complex British nationality law which distinguishes between British citizens, modern British Subjects, British Overseas Citizens, and overseas nationals, with each non-standard category created as a result of attempts to balance border control and the need to mitigate statelessness. This aspect of the rise of border control in the 20th century has proven controversial. The British Nationality Act 1981 has been criticised by experts, (Note: For example, Ann Dummett, an activist for racial equality, criticised the legislation, saying that "there is no indication at all in our nationality law of ethnic origin being a criterion. But the purpose of the law since 1981, and the manner in which it is implemented, make sure that ethnic origin is in fact and in practice a deciding factor." Ms Dummett also said that "the 1981 Nationality Act in effect gave full British citizenship to a group of whom at least 96% are white people, and the other, less favourable forms of British nationality to groups who are at least 98% non-white") as well as by the Committee on the Elimination of Racial Discrimination of the United Nations, (Note: In March 1996, there was a submission to the Committee on the Elimination of Racial Discrimination of United Nations. The committee criticised the arrangements of the BN(O) nationality under "Principal subjects of concern": "The Government's statement that South Asian residents of Hong Kong are granted some form of British nationality, whether that of a British National Overseas (BNO) or a British Overseas Citizen (BOC), so that no resident of Hong Kong would be left stateless following the transfer of sovereignty is noted with interest. It is, however, a matter of concern that such status does not grant the bearer the right of abode in the United Kingdom and contrasts with the full citizenship status conferred upon a predominantly white population living in another dependent territory. It is noted that most of the persons holding BNO or BOC status are Asians and that judgements on applications for citizenship appear to vary according to the country of origin, which leads to the assumption that this practice reveals elements of racial discrimination.") on the grounds that the different classes of British nationality it created are, in fact, closely related to the ethnic origins of their holders.

The creation of British Nationality (Overseas) status, for instance, (with fewer privileges than British citizen status) was met with criticism from many Hong Kong residents who felt that British citizenship would have been more appropriate in light of the "moral debt" owed to them by the UK. (Note: For example, the legislative councilor Henrietta Ip criticised the idea of British National (Overseas) and again urged the UK Parliament, to grant full British citizenship to Hong Kong's British nationals in the council meeting held on 5 July 1989, saying that "we were born and live under British rule on British land.... It is therefore... our right to ask that you should give us back a place of abode so that we can continue to live under British rule on British land if we so wish.... I represent most of all those who live here to firmly request and demand you to grant us the right to full British citizenship so that we can, if we so wish, live in the United Kingdom, our Motherland... I say to you that the right of abode in the United Kingdom is the best and the only definitive guarantee.... With your failure to give us such a guarantee, reluctant as I may, I must advise the people of Hong Kong, and urgently now, each to seek for themselves a home of last resort even if they have to leave to do so. I do so because, as a legislator, my duty is with the people first and the stability and prosperity of Hong Kong second, although the two are so interdependent....") (Note: The legislation is sometimes compared with Macau, a former colony of Portugal, where many residents of Chinese descent were granted right of abode in Portugal when Macau was still under colonial rule. They were not deprived of their right of abode after the transfer of sovereignty over Macau in 1999; their Portuguese passports and citizenship are valid and inheritable, and many of them still choose to stay in Macau.) Some British politicians (Note: Then Shadow Home Secretary, Jack Straw, said in a letter to the then Home Secretary Michael Howard dated 30 January 1997 that a claim that British National (Overseas) status amounts to British nationality "is pure sophistry".) and magazines (Note: The Economist also wrote critically in an article published on 3 July 1997 that "the failure to offer citizenship to most of Hong Kong's residents was shameful", and "it was the height of cynicism to hand 6m people over to a regime of proven brutality without allowing them any means to move elsewhere." The article commented that the real reason that the new Labour government still refused to give full British citizenship to other British Dependent Territories Citizens in around 1997 – because the United Kingdom was waiting until Hong Kong had been disposed of – "would be seen as highly cynical", as Baroness Symons, a Foreign Office minister, has conceded.) also criticised the creation of BN(O) status. In 2020, the British government under Boris Johnson announced a program under which BN(O)s would have leave to remain in the UK with rights to work and study for five years, after which they may apply for settled status. They would then be eligible for full citizenship after holding settled status for 12 months. This was implemented as the eponymously named "British National (Overseas) visa", a residence permit that BN(O)s and their dependent family members have been able to apply for since 31 January 2021. BN(O)s and their dependents who arrived in the UK before the new immigration route became available were granted "Leave Outside the Rules" at the discretion of the Border Force to remain in the country for up to six months as a temporary measure. In effect, this retroactively granted BN(O)s a path to right of abode in the United Kingdom. Despite the COVID-19 pandemic, about 7,000 people had entered the UK under this scheme between July 2020 and January 2021.

Ethnic tensions created during colonial occupation also resulted in discriminatory policies being adopted in newly independent African nations, such as Uganda under Idi Amin which banned Asians from Uganda, thus creating a mass exodus of the (largely Gujarati) Asian community of Uganda. Such ethnically driven border control policies took forms ranging from anti-Asian sentiment in East Africa to Apartheid policies in South Africa and Namibia (then known as Southwest Africa under South African rule) which created bantustans (Note: Bantustans within the borders of South Africa were classified as "self-governing" or "independent" and theoretically had some sovereign powers. Independent Bantustans (Transkei, Bophuthatswana, Venda, and Ciskei; also known as the TBVC states) were intended to be fully sovereign. In reality, they had no economic infrastructure worth mentioning and, with few exceptions, were composed of swaths of disconnected territory. This meant all the Bantustans were little more than puppet states controlled by South Africa. Throughout the existence of the independent Bantustans, South Africa remained the only country to recognise their independence. Nevertheless, internal organisations of many countries, as well as the South African government, lobbied for their recognition. For example, upon the foundation of Transkei, the Swiss-South African Association encouraged the Swiss government to recognise the new state. In 1976, leading up to a United States House of Representatives resolution urging the President not to recognise Transkei, the South African government intensely lobbied lawmakers to oppose the bill. While the bill fell short of the two-thirds vote it needed, a simple majority of lawmakers nevertheless supported the resolution. Each TBVC state extended recognition to the other independent Bantustans while South Africa showed its commitment to the notion of TBVC sovereignty by building embassies in the TBVC capitals.) and pass laws (Note: In South Africa, pass laws were designed to segregate the population, manage urbanisation, and allocate migrant labour. Also known as the natives law, pass laws severely limited the movements of not only blacks, but other people as well (e.g., Asians) by requiring them to carry passbooks when outside their homelands or designated areas. Before the 1950s, this legislation largely applied to African men, and attempts to apply it to women in the 1910s and 1950s were met with significant protests. Pass laws would be one of the dominant features of the country's apartheid system, until it was effectively ended in 1986. The first internal passports in South Africa were introduced on 27 June 1797 by the Earl Macartney in an attempt to prevent natives from entering the Cape Colony. In 1896 the South African Republic brought in two pass laws which required Africans to carry a metal badge and only those employed by a master were permitted to remain on the Rand. Those entering a "labour district" needed a special pass which entitled them to remain for three days. The Natives (Urban Areas) Act of 1923 deemed urban areas in South Africa as "white" and required all black African men in cities and towns to carry around permits called "passes" at all times. Anyone found without a pass would be arrested immediately and sent to a rural area. It was replaced in 1945 by the Natives (Urban Areas) Consolidation Act, which imposed "influx control" on black men, and also set up guidelines for removing people deemed to be living idle lives from urban areas. This act outlined requirements for African peoples' "qualification" to reside legally in white metropolitan areas.) to segregate and impose border controls against non-whites, and encouraged immigration of whites at the expense of Blacks as well as Indians and other Asians. Whilst border control in Europe and east of the Pacific have tightened over time, they have largely been liberalized in Africa, from Yoweri Museveni's reversal of Idi Amin's anti-Asian border controls (Note: Thousands of Gujaratis returned to Uganda after Yoweri Museveni, the subsequent head of state of Uganda, criticised Idi Amin's policies and invited them to return. According to Museveni, "Gujaratis have played a lead role in Uganda's social and industrial development. I knew that this community can do wonders for my country and they have been doing it for last many decades." The Gujaratis have resurfaced in Uganda and helped rebuild the economy of East Africa, and are financially well settled.) to the fall of Apartheid (and thus racialized border controls) in South Africa.

With the development of border control policies over the course of the 20th century came the standardization of refugee travel documents under the Convention Relating to the Status of Refugees of 1951 (Note: The 145 states which are parties to the convention are required to provide travel documents to refugees lawfully residing within their territory as per Article 28 of the convention. Refugee travel documents issued pursuant to Article 28 by certain states cannot be used for travel to the bearer's country of citizenship,) and the 1954 Convention travel document for stateless people under the similar 1954 statelessness convention.

=== COVID-19 ===
The COVID-19 pandemic in 2020 produced a drastic tightening of border controls across the globe. Many countries and regions have imposed quarantines, entry bans, or other restrictions on citizens of, or recent travellers to, the most affected areas. Other countries and regions have imposed global restrictions that apply to all foreign countries and territories, or prevent their own citizens from travelling overseas. The imposition of border controls has curtailed the spread of the virus, but because they were first implemented after community spread was established in multiple countries in different regions of the world, they produced only a modest reduction in the total number of people infected These strict border controls economic harm to the tourism industry through lost income and social harm to people who were unable to travel for family matters or other reasons. When the travel bans are lifted, many people are expected to resume travelling. However, some travel, especially business travel, may decrease in the long term as lower-cost alternatives, such as teleconferencing and virtual events, are preferred. A possible long-term impact has been a decline of business travel and international conferencing, and the rise of their virtual, online equivalents. Concerns have been raised over the effectiveness of travel restrictions to contain the spread of COVID-19.

== Tactics ==
Contemporary border control policies are complex and address a variety of distinct phenomena depending on the circumstances and political priorities of the state(s) implementing them. Consequently, several aspects of border control vary in nature and importance from region to region.

=== Air and maritime borders ===
In addition to land borders, countries also apply border control measures to airspace and waters under their jurisdiction. Such measures control access to air and maritime territory, as well as to extractable resources (e.g., fish, minerals, fossil fuels).

Under the United Nations Convention on the Law of the Sea (UNCLOS), states exercise varying degrees of control over different categories of territorial waters:

- Internal waters: Waters landward of the baseline, (Note: Normally, the baseline from which the territorial sea is measured is the low-water line along the coast as marked on large-scale charts officially recognised by the coastal state. This is either the low-water mark closest to the shore, or an unlimited distance from permanently exposed land, provided that some portion of elevations exposed at low tide but covered at high tide (such as mud flats) is within 5.6 km of permanently exposed land. Straight baselines can alternatively be defined connecting fringing islands along a coast, across the mouths of rivers, or, with certain restrictions, across the mouths of bays. In this case, a bay is defined as "a well-marked indentation whose penetration is in such proportion to the width of its mouth as to contain land-locked waters and constitute more than a mere curvature of the coast. An indentation shall not, however, be regarded as a bay unless its area is as large as, or larger than, that of the semi-circle whose diameter is a line drawn across the mouth of that indentation". The baseline across the bay must also be no more than 44 km in length.) over which the state has complete sovereignty: not even innocent passage (Note: All "archipelagic waters" within the outermost islands of an archipelagic state such as Indonesia or the Philippines are also considered internal waters. They are treated the same, except that innocent passage through them must be allowed. However, archipelagic states may designate certain sea lanes through these waters.) is allowed without explicit permission from said state. Lakes and rivers are considered internal waters.
- Territorial sea: A state's territorial sea is a belt of coastal waters extending at most 22 kilometres from the baseline of a coastal state. If this overlaps with another state's territorial sea, the border is taken as the median line between the states' baselines, unless the states in question agree otherwise. A state can also choose to claim a smaller territorial sea. The territorial sea is regarded as the sovereign territory of the state. However, foreign ships (military and civilian) are allowed innocent passage through it, or transit passage for straits; this sovereignty also extends to the airspace over and seabed below. As a result of UNCLOS, states exercise a similar degree of control over their territorial sea as over land territory. They may thus utilise coast guard and naval patrols to enforce border control measures, provided they do not prevent innocent or transit passage.
- Contiguous zone: A state's contiguous zone is a band of water extending farther from the outer edge of the territorial sea to up to 44 kilometres (27 miles) from the baseline, within which a state can implement limited border control measures for the purpose of preventing or punishing "infringement of its customs, fiscal, immigration or sanitary laws and regulations within its territory or territorial sea". This will typically be 22 kilometres (14 miles) wide, but could be more (if a state has chosen to claim a territorial sea of less than 22 kilometres), or less, if it would otherwise overlap another state's contiguous zone. However, unlike the territorial sea, there is no standard rule for resolving such conflicts, and the states in question must negotiate their own compromise. America invoked a contiguous zone out to 44 kilometres from the baseline on 29 September 1999.
- Exclusive economic zone: An exclusive economic zone extends from the baseline to a maximum of 370 kilometres (230 miles). A coastal nation has control of all economic resources within its exclusive economic zone, including fishing, mining, oil exploration, and any pollution of those resources. However, it cannot prohibit passage or loitering above, on, or under the surface of the sea that complies with the laws and regulations adopted by the coastal State in accordance with the provisions of the UN Convention, within that portion of its exclusive economic zone beyond its territorial sea. The only authority a state has over its EEZ is, therefore, its ability to regulate the extraction or spoliation of resources contained therein, and border-control measures implemented to this effect focus on the suppression of unauthorised commercial activity.

Vessels not complying with a state's maritime policies may be subject to ship arrest and enforcement action by the state's authorities. Maritime border control measures are controversial in the context of international trade disputes, as was the case following France's detention of British fishermen in October 2021 in the aftermath of Brexit or when the Indonesian navy detained the crew of the Seven Seas Conqueress alleging that the vessel was unlawfully fishing within Indonesian territorial waters while the Singaporean government claimed the vessel was in Singaporean waters near Pedra Branca.

Similarly, international law accords each state control over the airspace above its land territory, internal waters, and territorial sea. Consequently, states have the authority to regulate flyover rights and tax foreign aircraft utilising their airspace. Additionally, the International Civil Aviation Organization designates states to administer international airspace, including airspace over waters that do not form part of any state's territorial sea. Aircraft unlawfully entering a country's airspace may be grounded, and their crews may be detained.

No country has sovereignty over international waters, including the associated airspace. All states have the freedom to fish, navigate, overfly, lay cables and pipelines, and conduct research. Oceans, seas, and waters outside national jurisdiction are also referred to as the high seas or, in Latin, mare liberum (meaning free sea). The 1958 Convention on the High Seas defined "high seas" to mean "all parts of the sea that are not included in the territorial sea or in the internal waters of a State" and where "no State may validly purport to subject any part of them to its sovereignty". Ships sailing the high seas are generally under the jurisdiction of their flag state (if there is one); however, when a ship is involved in certain criminal acts, such as piracy, any nation can exercise jurisdiction under the doctrine of universal jurisdiction regardless of maritime borders.

As part of their air and maritime border control policies, most countries restrict or regulate the ability of foreign airlines and vessels to transport goods or passengers between seaports and airports in their jurisdiction, known as cabotage. Restrictions on maritime cabotage exist in most countries with territorial and internal waters to protect the domestic shipping industry from foreign competition, preserve domestically owned shipping infrastructure for national security, and ensure safety in congested territorial waters. For example, in America, the Jones Act provides for extremely strict restrictions on cabotage. (Note: All goods transported by water between American ports must be carried on ships that have been constructed in the United States and that fly the American flag, are owned by American citizens, and are crewed by American citizens and/or permanent residents) Similarly, China does not permit foreign flagged vessels to conduct domestic transport or domestic transhipments without the prior approval of the Ministry of Transport. While Hong Kong and Macau maintain distinct internal cabotage regimes from the mainland, maritime cabotage between either territory and the mainland is considered domestic carriage and accordingly is off limits to foreign vessels. Similarly, maritime crossings across the Taiwan Strait require special permits from both the People's Republic of China and the Republic of China (Note: The area under the definition consists of: Taiwan (Chinese: 台灣); Penghu (Chinese: 澎湖); Kinmen (Chinese: 金門; pinyin: Jīnmén); Matsu Islands (Chinese: 馬祖列島; pinyin: Mǎzǔ Lièdǎo); Other nearby islands) and are usually off-limits to foreign vessels. In India, foreign vessels engaging in the coasting trade (Note: Defined as: the carriage of goods or passengers from any port or place in India to any other port or place in India or Sri Lanka) require a licence that is generally only issued when no local vessel is available. Similarly, a foreign vessel may only be issued a licence to engage in cabotage in Brazil if there are no Brazilian flagged vessels available for the intended transport.

As with maritime cabotage, most jurisdictions heavily restrict cabotage in passenger aviation, though rules regarding air cargo are typically more lax. Passenger cabotage is not usually granted under most open skies agreements. Air cabotage policies in the European Union are uniquely liberal insofar as carriers licensed by one member state are permitted to engage in cabotage in any EU member state, with few limitations. Chile has the most liberal air cabotage rules in the world, enacted in 1979, which allow foreign airlines to operate domestic flights, conditional upon reciprocal treatment for Chilean carriers in the foreign airline's country. Countries apply special provisions to the ability of foreign airlines to carry passengers between two domestic destinations through an offshore hub. (Note: For instance, a Boston-Toronto-Seattle itinerary. Such services are currently considered to constitute cabotage and are not permitted. In 2002, American authorities fined Asiana Airlines for selling tickets from the mainland US to Guam and Saipan via Seoul.)

Many countries implement air defence identification zones (ADIZs) requiring aircraft approaching within a specified distance of their airspace to contact or seek prior authorization from their military or transport authorities. An ADIZ may extend beyond a country's territory to give the country more time to respond to possibly hostile aircraft. The concept of an ADIZ is not defined in any international treaty and is not regulated by any international body, but is nevertheless a well-established aerial border control measure. (Note: About 20 countries and regions now have such zones including Canada, India, Japan, Pakistan, Bangladesh, Finland, Norway, the United Kingdom, People's Republic of China, South Korea, Republic of China, America, Sweden, Iceland and Iran. Russia and North Korea have unofficial ADIZs as well.) Usually such zones only cover undisputed territory, do not apply to foreign aircraft not intending to enter territorial airspace, and do not overlap.

=== Biosecurity ===
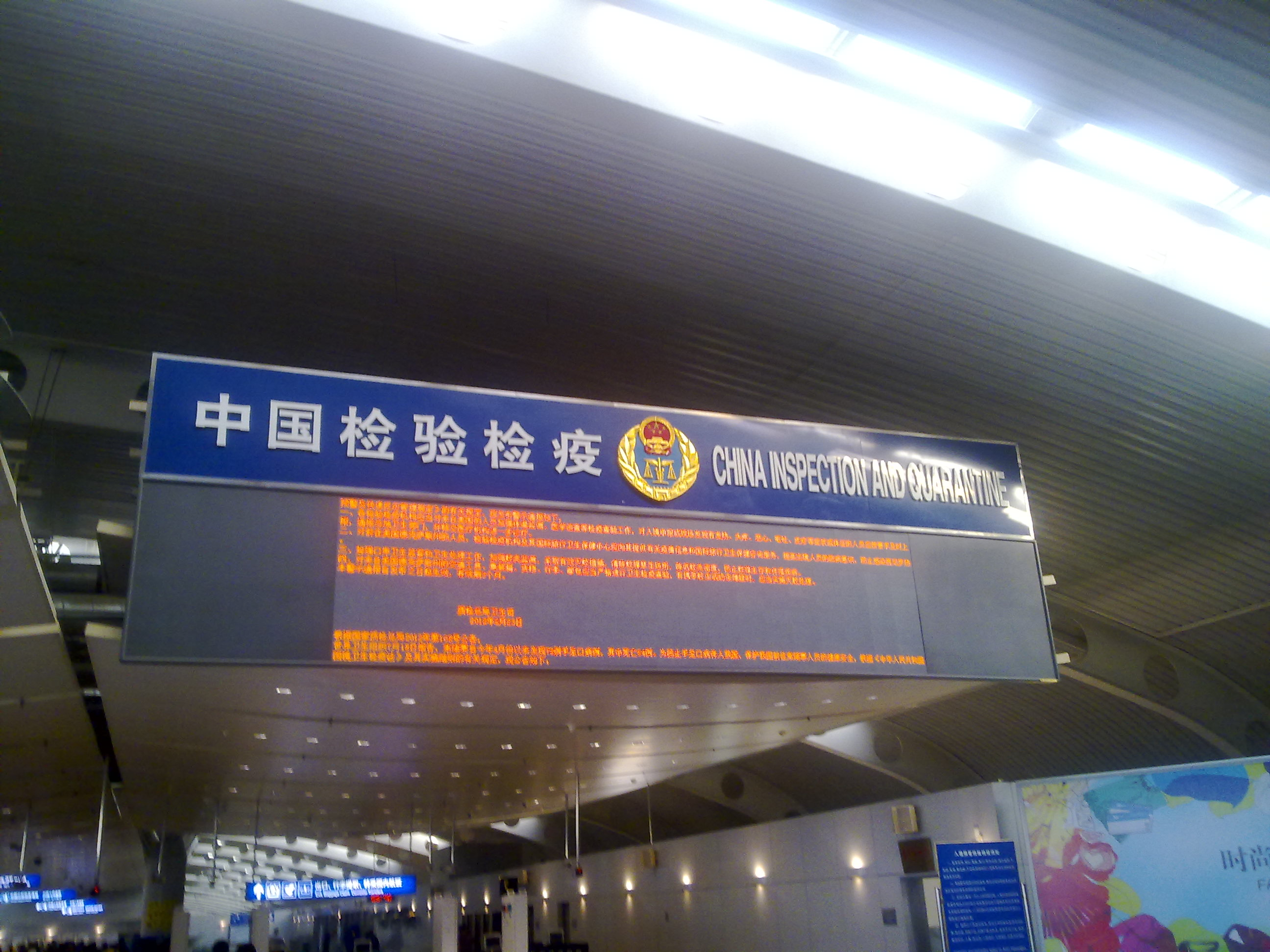
Quarantine operations deployed by mainland Chinese border control

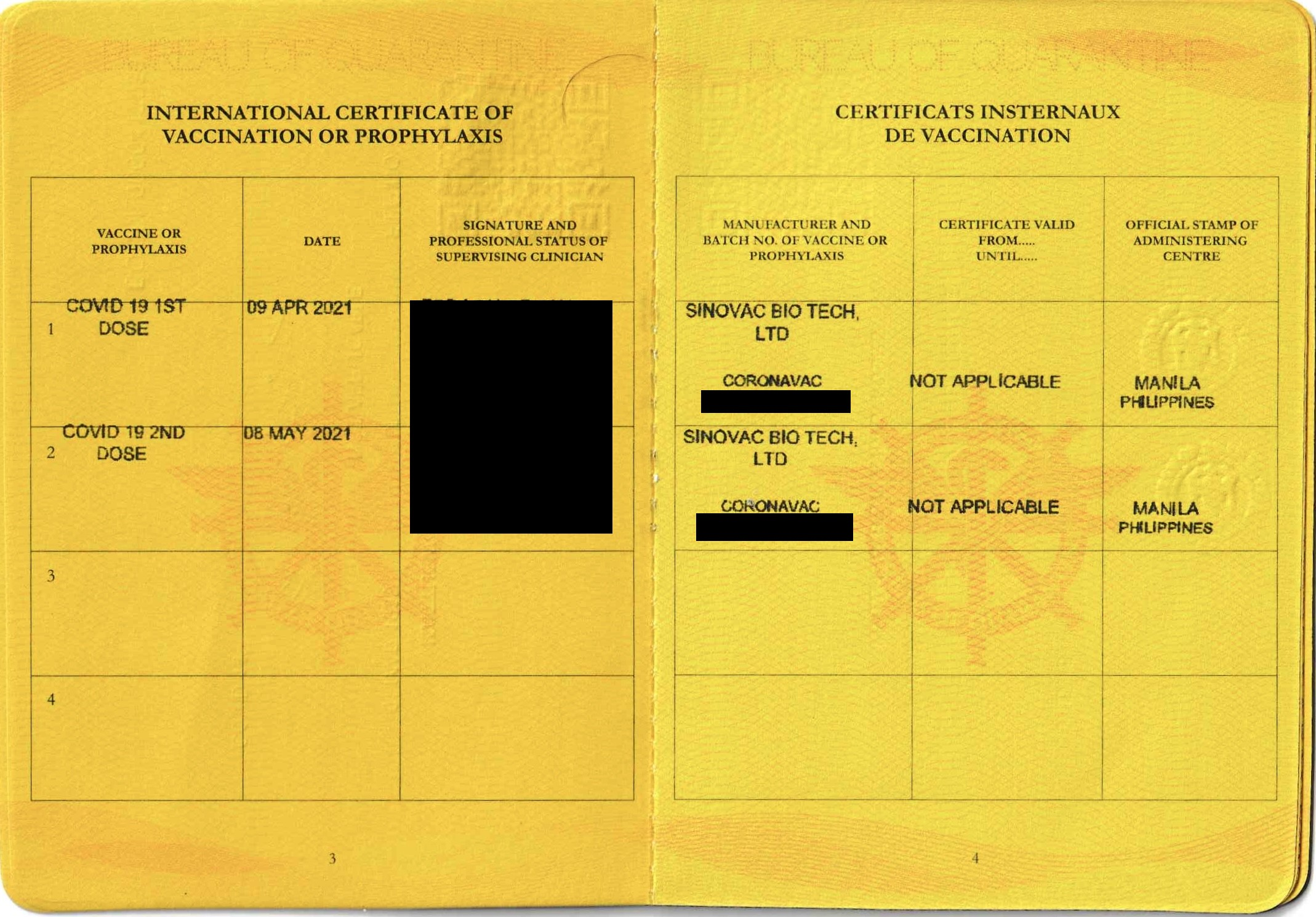
An International Certificate of Vaccination issued by the Bureau of Quarantine in the Philippines to an individual after being vaccinated with a COVID-19 vaccine in 2021

Biosecurity refers to measures aimed at preventing the introduction and/or spread of harmful organisms (e.g., viruses, bacteria, etc.) to animals and plants to mitigate the risk of transmission of infectious disease. In agriculture, these measures are aimed at protecting food crops and livestock from pests, invasive species, and other organisms not conducive to the welfare of the human population. The term includes biological threats to people, such as pandemic diseases and bioterrorism. The definition has sometimes been broadened to embrace other concepts, and it is used for different purposes in different contexts. The most common category of biosecurity policies is quarantine measures adopted to counteract the spread of disease and, when applied as part of border control, primarily focus on mitigating the entry of infected individuals, plants, or animals into a country. Other aspects of biosecurity related to border control include mandatory vaccination policies for inbound travellers and measures to curtail the risk posed by bioterrorism or invasive species. Quarantine measures are frequently implemented regarding the mobility of animals, including both pets and livestock. Notably, to reduce the risk of introducing rabies from continental Europe, the United Kingdom used to require that dogs and most other animals introduced into the country spend six months in quarantine at an HM Customs and Excise pound. This policy was abolished in 2000 in favour of a scheme generally known as Pet Passports, under which animals can avoid quarantine if they have documentation showing they are up to date with their appropriate vaccinations.

In the past, European countries implemented quarantine measures to curb the Bubonic Plague and Cholera. In the British Isles, for example, the Quarantine Act 1710 (9 Ann. c. 2) established maritime quarantine policies in an era in which strict border control measures as a whole were yet to become mainstream. The first act was called for due to fears that the plague might be imported from Poland and the Baltic states. A second act of Parliament, the Quarantine Act 1721 (8 Geo. 1. c. 10), was due to the prevalence of the plague at Marseille and other places in Provence, France. It was renewed in 1733 after a new outbreak in continental Europe, and again in 1743, due to an epidemic in Messina. A rigorous quarantine clause was introduced into the Levant Act 1752, an act regulating trade with the Levant, and various arbitrary orders were issued during the next twenty years to meet the supposed danger of infection from the Baltic states. Although no plague cases ever came to England during that period, the restrictions on traffic became more stringent, and a very strict Quarantine and Customs Act 1788 (28 Geo. 3. c. 34) was passed, with provisions affecting cargoes in particular. The act was revised in 1801 and 1805, and in 1823–24 an elaborate inquiry was followed by an act making quarantine only at the discretion of the Privy Council, which recognised yellow fever or other highly infectious diseases as calling for quarantine, along with plague. The threat of cholera in 1831 was the last occasion in England when quarantine restrictions were used. Cholera affected every country in Europe despite all efforts to keep it out. When cholera returned to England in 1849, 1853, and 1865–66, no attempt was made to seal the ports. In 1847 the privy council ordered all arrivals with a clean bill of health from the Black Sea and the Levant to be admitted, provided there had been no case of plague during the voyage and afterwards, the practice of quarantine was discontinued.

In modern maritime law, biosecurity measures for arriving vessels centre on 'pratique', a licence issued by border control officials permitting a ship to enter port, on the assurance of the captain that the vessel is free from contagious disease. The clearance granted is commonly referred to as 'free pratique'. A ship can signal a request for 'pratique' by flying a solid yellow square-shaped flag. This yellow flag is the Q flag in the set of international maritime signal flags. In the event that 'free pratique' is not granted, a vessel will be held in quarantine according to biosecurity rules prevailing at the port of entry until a border control officer inspects the vessel. During the COVID-19 pandemic, a controversy arose as to who granted pratique to the Ruby Princess. A related concept is the 'bill of health', a document issued by officials of a port of departure indicating to the officials of the port of arrival whether it is likely that the ship is carrying a contagious disease, either literally on board as fomites or via its crewmen or passengers. As defined in a consul's handbook from 1879:

A bill of health is a document issued by the consul or the public authorities of the port which a ship sails from, descriptive of the health of the port at the time of the vessel's clearance. A clean bill of health certifies that at the date of its issue no infectious disease was known to exist either in the port or its neighbourhood. A suspected or touched bill of health reports that rumours were in circulation that an infectious disease had appeared but that the rumour had not been confirmed by any known cases. A foul bill of health or the absence of a clean bill of health implies that the place the vessel cleared from was infected with a contagious disease. The two latter cases would render the vessel liable to quarantine.

Another category of biosecurity measures adopted by border control organisations is mandatory vaccination. As a result of the prevalence of Yellow Fever across much of the African continent, a significant portion of countries in the region require arriving passengers to present an International Certificate of Vaccination or Prophylaxis (Carte Jaune) certifying that they have received the Yellow Fever vaccine. A variety of other countries require travelers who have visited areas where Yellow Fever is endemic to present a certificate to clear border checkpoints, as a means of preventing the spread of the disease. Before the emergence of COVID-19, Yellow Fever was the primary human disease subject to de facto vaccine passport measures by border control authorities worldwide. Similar measures are in place regarding Polio and meningococcal meningitis in regions where those diseases are endemic and in countries bordering those regions. Before the eradication of smallpox, similar Carte Jaune requirements were in force for that disease around the world.

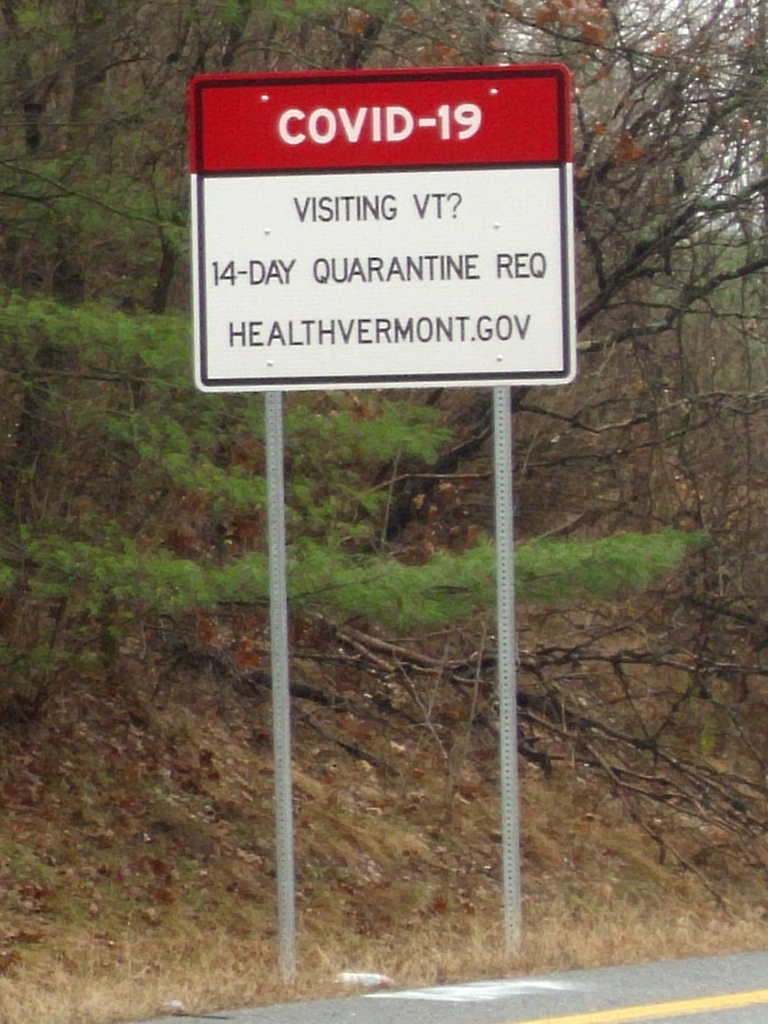
A road sign at an exit on Interstate 91 in Vermont advising individuals entering the state of a quarantine policy adopted in response to COVID-19, photographed in November 2020

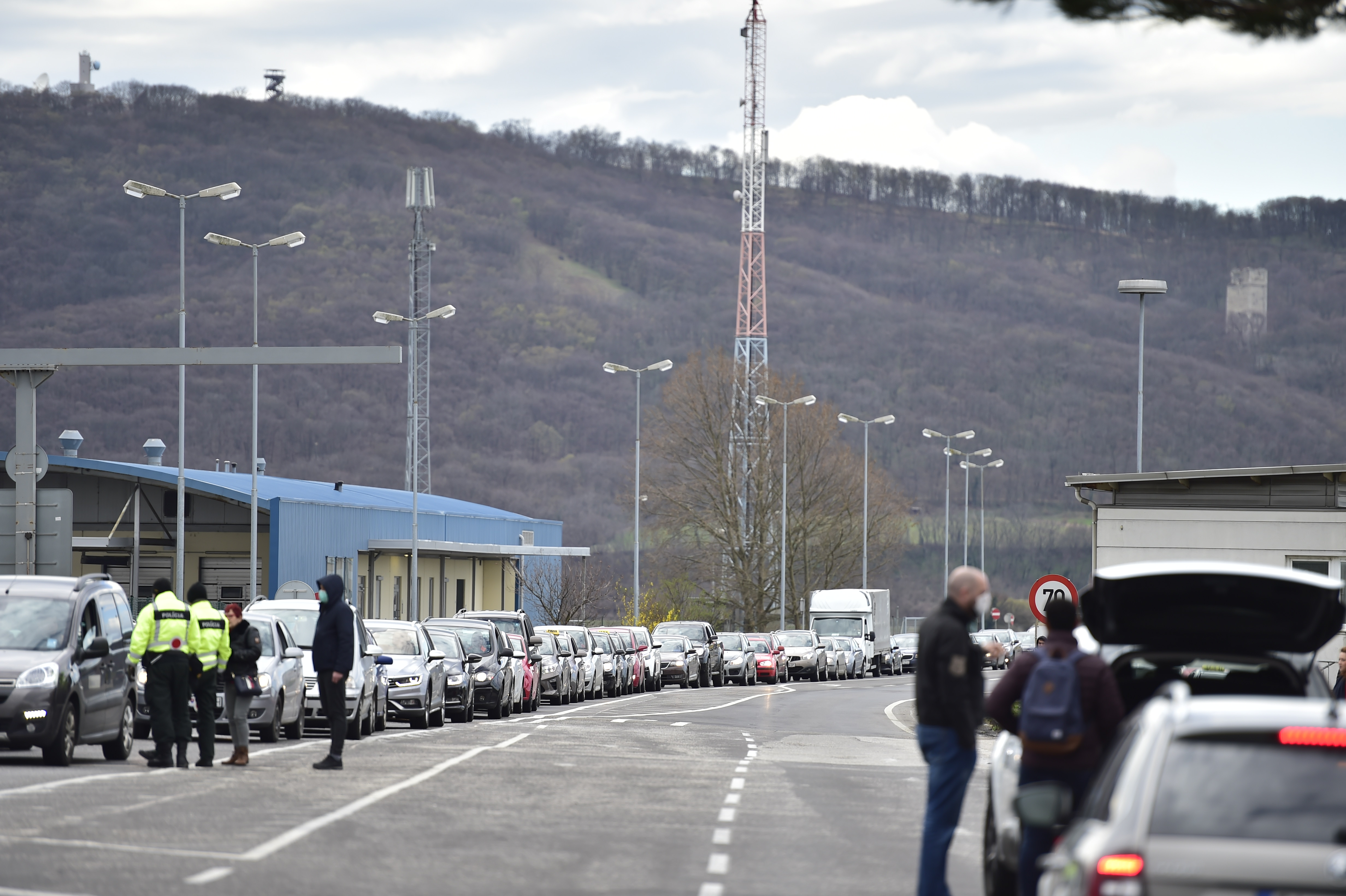
Slovakia, which otherwise maintains open borders with other Schengen Area jurisdictions, closed borders to non-residents because of the COVID-19 pandemic.

As a result of the COVID-19 pandemic, biosecurity measures have become a highly visible aspect of border control across the globe. Most notably, quarantine and mandatory COVID-19 vaccination for international travelers. Together with a decreased willingness to travel, the implementation of biosecurity measures has had a negative economic and social impact on the travel industry. Slow travel gained popularity during the pandemic, with tourists visiting fewer destinations on their trips.

Biosecurity measures such as restrictions on cross-border travel, the introduction of mandatory vaccination for international travellers, and the adoption of quarantine or mandatory testing measures have helped to contain the spread of COVID-19. While test-based border screening measures may prove effective under certain circumstances, they may fail to detect a significant quantity of positive cases if only conducted upon arrival without follow-up. A minimum 10-day quarantine may help prevent the spread of COVID-19 and may be more effective when combined with additional control measures, such as border screening. A study in Science found that travel restrictions could delay the initial arrival of COVID-19 in a country, but that they produced only modest overall effects unless combined with domestic infection prevention and control measures to reduce transmissions considerably. (That is consistent with prior research on influenza and other communicable diseases.) Travel bans early in the pandemic were most effective for isolated locations, such as small island nations.

During the COVID-19 pandemic, many jurisdictions around the world introduced biosecurity measures at internal borders. This ranged from quarantine measures imposed upon individuals crossing state lines within America to prohibitions on interstate travel in Australia.

=== Customs ===
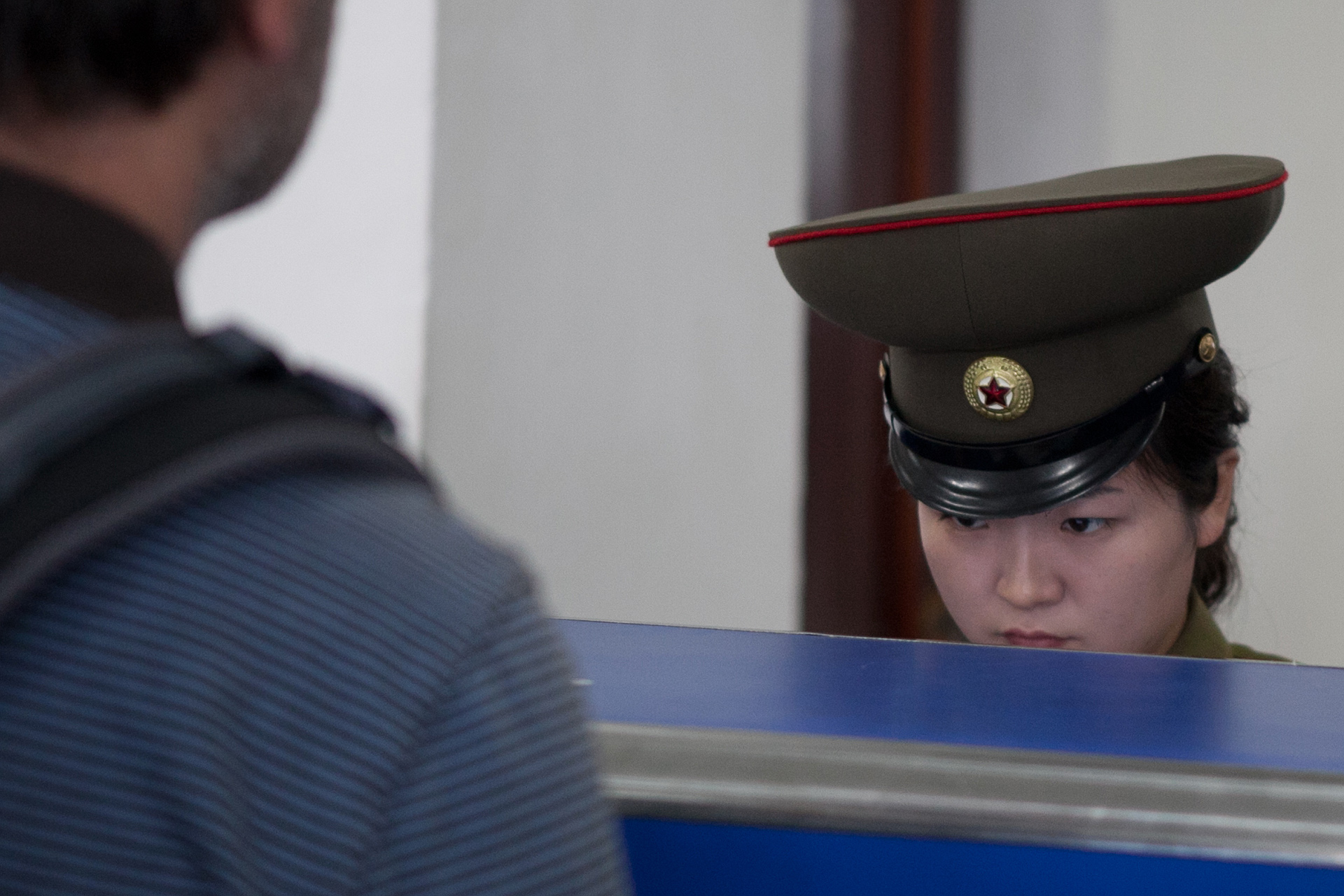
North Korean customs officer at Pyongyang Sunan International Airport

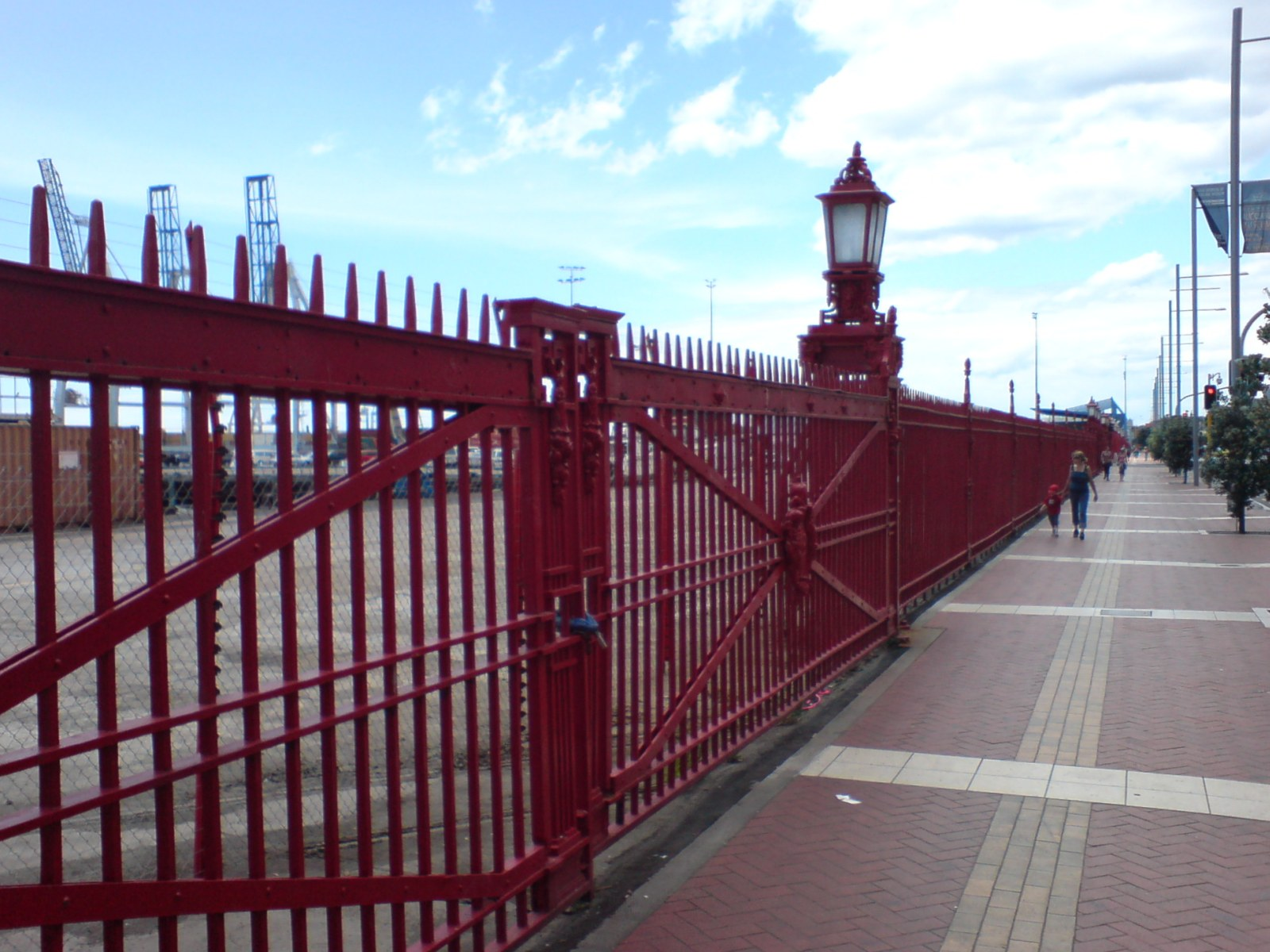
Southern edge (customs border) of Captain Cook wharf, Ports of Auckland, New Zealand; an electric fence is faintly visible behind the historical fence

Each country has its own laws and regulations for the import and export of goods into and out of a country, which its customs authority enforces. The import or export of certain goods may be restricted or prohibited, in which case customs controls enforce these policies. Customs enforcement at borders can also entail collecting excise tax and preventing the smuggling of dangerous or illegal goods. A customs duty is a tariff or tax on the importation (usually) or exportation (unusually) of goods.

In many countries, border controls for arriving passengers at many international airports and some road crossings are separated into red and green channels to prioritise customs enforcement. Within the European Union's common customs area, airports may operate additional blue channels for passengers arriving from within that area. For such passengers, border control may focus specifically on prohibited items and other goods that are not covered by the common policy. Luggage tags for checked luggage travelling within the EU are green-edged to facilitate identification. In most EU member states, travellers coming from other EU countries within the Schengen Area can use the green lane. However, airports outside the Schengen Area, or those with frequent flights arriving from jurisdictions within the Schengen Area but outside the European Union, may use blue channels for convenience and efficiency.

A customs area is a designated area for storing commercial goods that have not cleared border controls. Commercial goods not yet cleared through customs are often stored in a customs area known as a bonded warehouse until processed or re-exported. Ports authorized to handle international cargo generally include recognised bonded warehouses. For customs duties, goods within the customs area are treated as being outside the country. This allows easy transshipment to a third country without the involvement of customs authorities. For this reason, customs areas are usually carefully controlled and fenced to prevent smuggling. However, the area is still part of the country's territory. Hence, the goods within the area are subject to other local laws (for example, drug laws and biosecurity regulations) and may thus be searched, impounded, or turned back. The term is also sometimes used to define an area (usually composed of several countries) that forms a customs union, a customs territory, or to describe the area at airports and ports where travellers are checked through customs.

Sanitary and phytosanitary (SPS) measures are customs measures to protect humans, animals, and plants from diseases, pests, or contaminants. The Agreement on the Application of Sanitary and Phytosanitary Measures, concluded at the Uruguay Round of the Multilateral Trade Negotiations, establishes the types of SPS measures that each jurisdiction may impose. Examples of SPS are tolerance limits for residues, restricted use of substances, labelling requirements related to food safety, hygienic requirements, and quarantine requirements. In certain countries, sanitary and phytosanitary measures focus extensively on curtailing and regulating the import of foreign agricultural products to protect domestic ecosystems. For example, Australian border controls restrict most (if not all) food products, certain wooden products, and other similar items. Similar restrictions exist in Canada, America and New Zealand.

Map depicting countries with a policy of executing drug traffickers Only under certain conditions Capital punishment for drug offences

Border control in many countries in Asia and the Americas prioritizes enforcing customs laws pertaining to narcotics. For instance, India and Malaysia are focusing resources on eliminating drug smuggling from Myanmar and Thailand, respectively. The issue stems largely from the high output of dangerous and illegal drugs in the Golden Triangle as well as in regions further west, such as Afghanistan. A similar problem exists east of the Pacific. It has resulted in countries such as Mexico and the United States tightening border control in response to the northward flow of illegal substances from regions such as Colombia. The Mexican drug war and similar cartel activity in neighboring areas have exacerbated the problem. In certain countries, illegal importing, exporting, selling, or possessing drugs constitutes capital offences and may result in a death sentence. A 2015 article by The Economist says that the laws of 32 countries provide for capital punishment for drug smuggling. Still, only in six countries – China, Iran, Saudi Arabia, Vietnam, Malaysia, and Singapore –are drug offenders known to be routinely executed. Additionally, Singapore, Malaysia, and Indonesia impose mandatory death sentences on individuals caught smuggling restricted substances across their borders. For example, Muhammad Ridzuan Ali was executed in Singapore on 19 May 2017, for drug trafficking. According to a 2011 article by the Lawyers Collective, an NGO in India, "32 countries impose capital punishment for offences involving narcotic drugs and psychotropic substances." South Korean law provides for capital punishment for drug offences, but South Korea has a de facto moratorium on capital punishment as there have been no executions since 1997, even though there are still people on death row and new death sentences continue to be handed down.

=== Border security ===
Border security refers to measures taken by one or more governments to enforce their border control policies. Such measures target a variety of issues, ranging from customs violations and trade in unlawful goods to the suppression of unauthorized migration or travel. The specific border security measures taken by a jurisdiction vary with local authorities' priorities and are influenced by social, economic, and geographical factors. Some countries use deadly force to deter illegal entry. Sanctions for attempted illegal entry were found to deter repeated attempts (recidivism).

In India, which maintains free movement with Nepal and Bhutan, border security focuses primarily on the Bangladeshi, Pakistani, and Myanmar borders. India's primary focus with regard to the border with Bangladesh is to deter unlawful immigration and drug trafficking. On the Pakistani border, the Border Security Force aims to prevent the infiltration of Indian territory by terrorists from Pakistan and other countries in the west (Afghanistan, Iraq, Syria, etc.). In contrast, India's border with Myanmar is porous and the 2021 military coup in Myanmar saw an influx of refugees seeking asylum in border states including Mizoram. The refoulement of Rohingya refugees is a contentious aspect of India's border control policy vis à vis Myanmar.

Meanwhile, American border security policy is largely centred on the country's border with Mexico. Security along this border comprises many distinct elements, including physical barriers, patrol routes, lighting, and border patrol personnel. In contrast, the border with Canada is primarily maintained through joint border patrol and security camera programs, making it the world's longest undefended border. In remote areas along the border with Canada, where staffed border crossings are unavailable, there are hidden sensors on roads, trails, railways, and wooded areas near crossing points.

Members of the Schengen Agreement are required to apply strict checks on travellers entering and exiting the area. These checks are coordinated by the European Union's Frontex agency, and subject to common rules. The details of border controls, surveillance and the conditions under which permission to enter into the Schengen Area may be granted are exhaustively detailed in the Schengen Borders Code. All persons crossing external borders are subject to a check by a border guard. The only exception is for regular cross-border commuters (both those with the right of free movement and third-country nationals) who are well known to the border guards: once an initial check has shown that there is no alert on record relating to them in the Schengen Information System or national databases, they can only be subject to occasional 'random' checks, rather than systematic checks every time they cross the border. Additionally, border security in Europe is increasingly being outsourced to private companies, with the border security market growing at a rate of 7% per year. In its Border Wars series, the Transnational Institute showed that the arms and security industry helps shape European border security policy through lobbying, regular interactions with the EU's border institutions, and its shaping of research policy. The institute criticises the border security industry for having a vested interest in increasing border militarisation to increase profits. Furthermore, the same companies are also often involved in the arms trade and thus profit twice: first from fuelling the conflicts, repression, and human rights abuses that have led refugees to flee their homes and later from intercepting them along their migration routes.

==== Border walls ====
Border walls are a common aspect of border security measures worldwide. Border walls generally seek to limit unauthorised travel across an international border and are frequently implemented as a populist response to refugees and economic migrants.

The India-Bangladesh barrier is a 3,406 kilometres (2,116 miles) long fence of barbed wire and concrete just under 3 metres (9 feet 10 inches) high, currently under construction. Its stated aim is to limit unauthorised migration. The project has run into several delays; there is no clear completion date for the project yet. Similar to India's barrier with Bangladesh and the proposed wall between America and Mexico, Iran has constructed a wall on its frontier with Pakistan. The wall aims to reduce unauthorised border crossings and stem the flow of drugs, and is also a response to terrorist attacks, notably the one in the Iranian border town of Zahedan on 17 February 2007, which killed thirteen people, including nine Iranian Revolutionary Guard officials. President Donald Trump's proposal to build a new wall along the border formed a major feature of his 2016 presidential campaign and over the course of his presidency, his administration spent approximately US$15 billion on the project, with US$5 billion appropriated from US Customs and Border Protection, US$6.3 billion appropriated from anti-narcotics initiative funded by congress and US$3.6 billion appropriated from the American military. Members of both the Democratic & Republican parties who opposed Trump's border control policies regarded the border wall as unnecessary or undesirable, arguing that other measures would be more effective at reducing illegal immigration than building a wall, including tackling the economic issues that lead to immigration being a relevant issue altogether, border surveillance or an increase in the number of customs agents. Additionally, in August 2020, the United States constructed 3.8 km of short cable fencing along the border between Abbotsford, British Columbia, and Whatcom County, Washington.

Border walls have formed a major component of European border control policy following the European migrant crisis. The walls at Melilla and at Ceuta on Spain's border with Morocco are designed to curtail refugees' and migrants' ability to enter the European Union via the two Spanish cities on the Moroccan coast. Similar measures have been taken on the Schengen area's borders with Turkey in response to the refugee crisis in Syria. The creation of the European Union's collective border security organisation, Frontex, is another aspect of the bloc's growing focus on border security. Within the Schengen Area, border security has become an especially prominent priority for the Hungarian government under right-wing strongman Viktor Orbán. (Note: Hungary completed the construction of 175 kilometres of fencing along its border with Serbia in September 2015, and along its border with Croatia in October 2015, to stop unauthorised border crossings. In April 2016, Hungarian government announced construction of reinforcements of the barrier, which it described as "temporary". In July 2016, nearly 1,300 migrants were "stuck" on the Serbian side of the border. In August 2016, Orbán announced that Hungary would build another larger barrier on its southern border. On 28 April 2017, the Hungarian government announced it had completed a second fence, 155 kilometres long, with Serbia. On 24 September 2015, Hungary began building fence on its border with Slovenia, in the area around Tornyiszentmiklós–Pince border crossing. The razor wire obstacle was removed two days later.) Similarly, Saudi Arabia has begun construction of a border barrier or fence between its territory and Yemen to prevent the unauthorized movement of people and goods. The disparity in the countries' economic conditions means that many Yemenis head to Saudi Arabia to find work. Saudi Arabia does not have a barrier with its other neighbours in the Gulf Cooperation Council, whose economies are more similar to its own. In 2006 Saudi Arabia proposed constructing a security fence along the entire length of its 900 kilometre long desert border with Iraq. As of July 2009 it was reported that Saudis will pay $3.5 billion for a security fence. The combined wall and ditch will be 965 kilometres (600 miles) long and include five layers of fencing, watch towers, night-vision cameras, and radar cameras and manned by 30,000 troops. Elsewhere in Europe, the Republic of Macedonia began erecting a fence on its border with Greece in November 2015.

In 2003, Botswana began building a 480 kilometres (300 miles) long electric fence along its border with Zimbabwe. The official reason for the fence is to stop the spread of foot-and-mouth disease among livestock. Zimbabweans argue that the fence's height is clearly intended to keep people out. Botswana has responded that the fence is designed to keep out cattle and to ensure that entrants have their shoes disinfected at legal border crossings. Botswana also argued that the government continues to encourage legal movement into the country. Zimbabwe was unconvinced, and the barrier remains a source of tension.

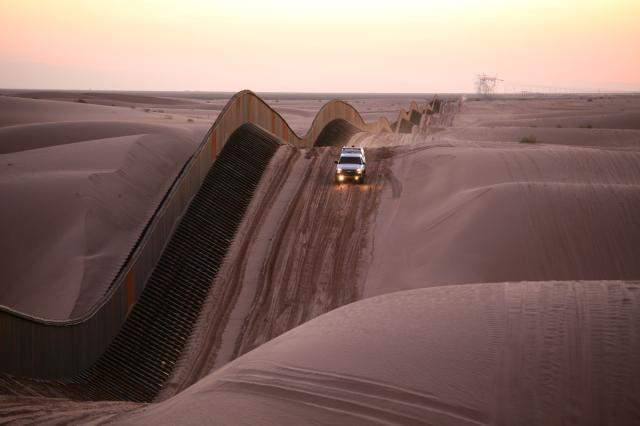
Mexico–US fence, from California

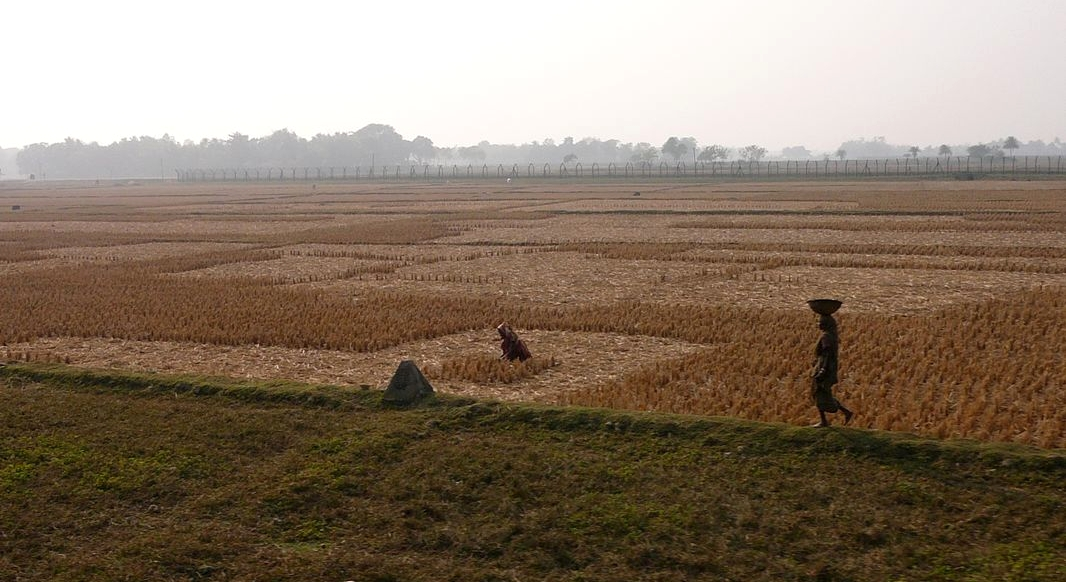
Indian fence, from Hili, Bangladesh

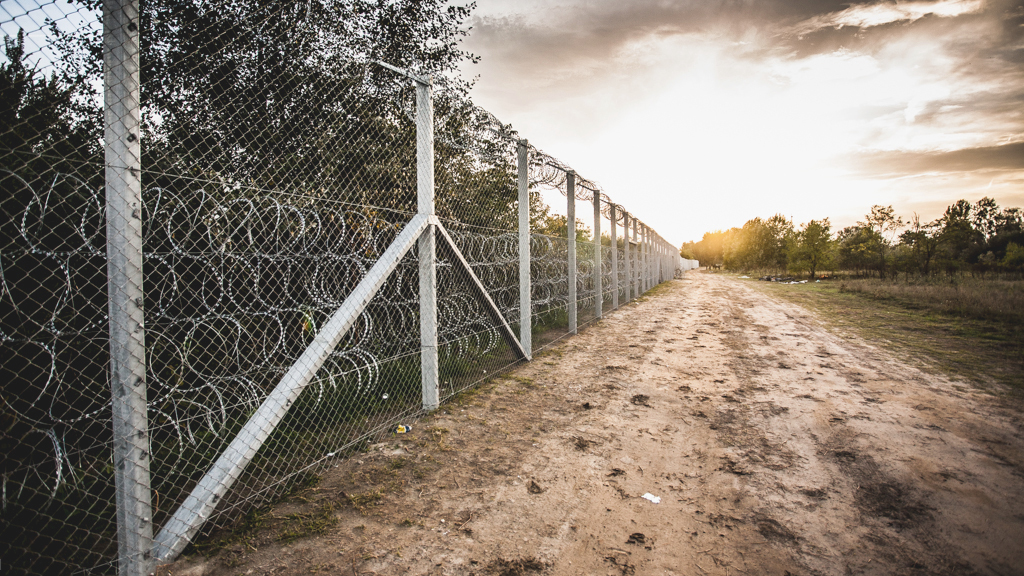
Hungary–Serbia fence, from Hungary

==== Border checkpoints ====
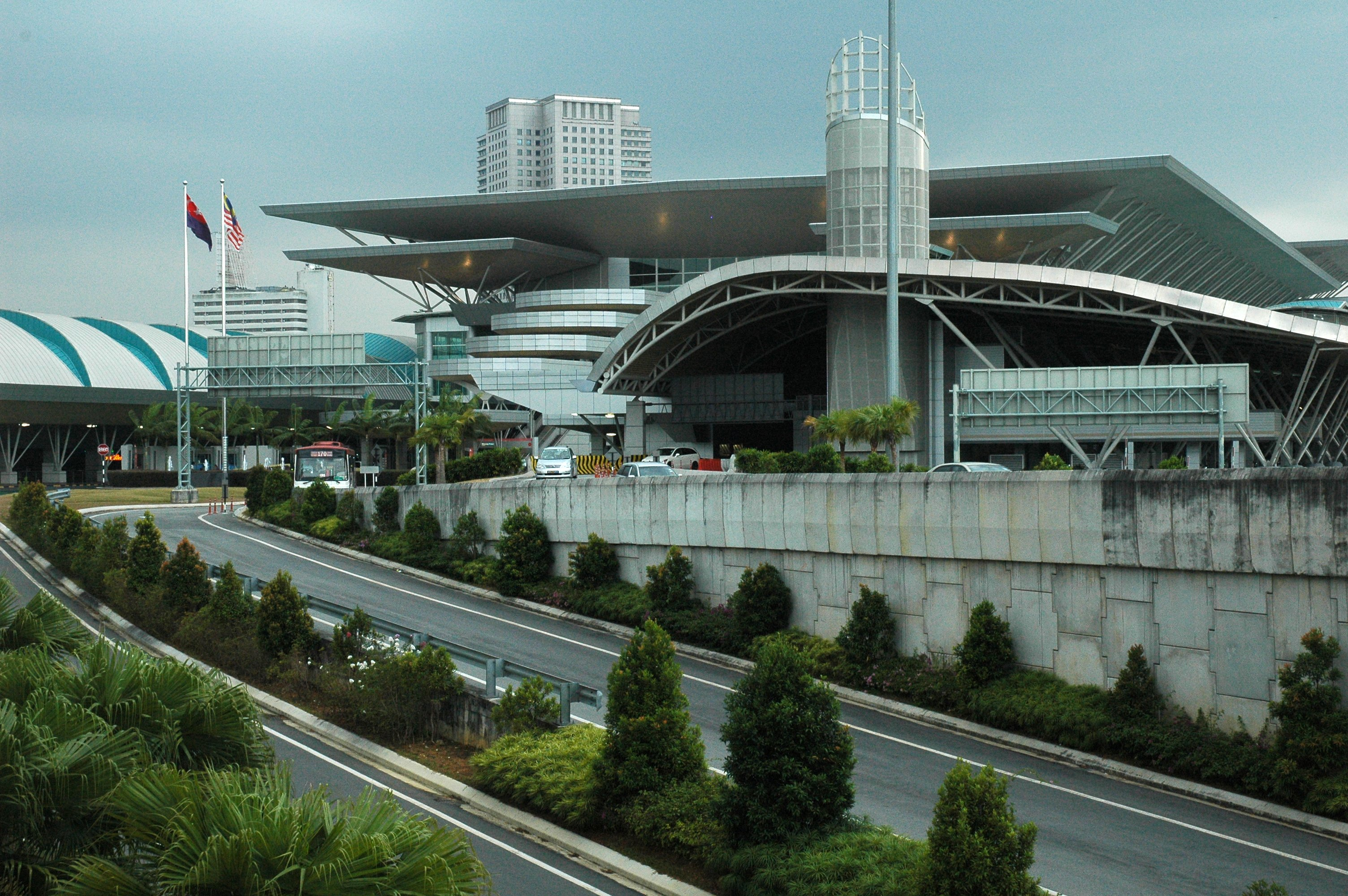
Sultan Iskandar Building

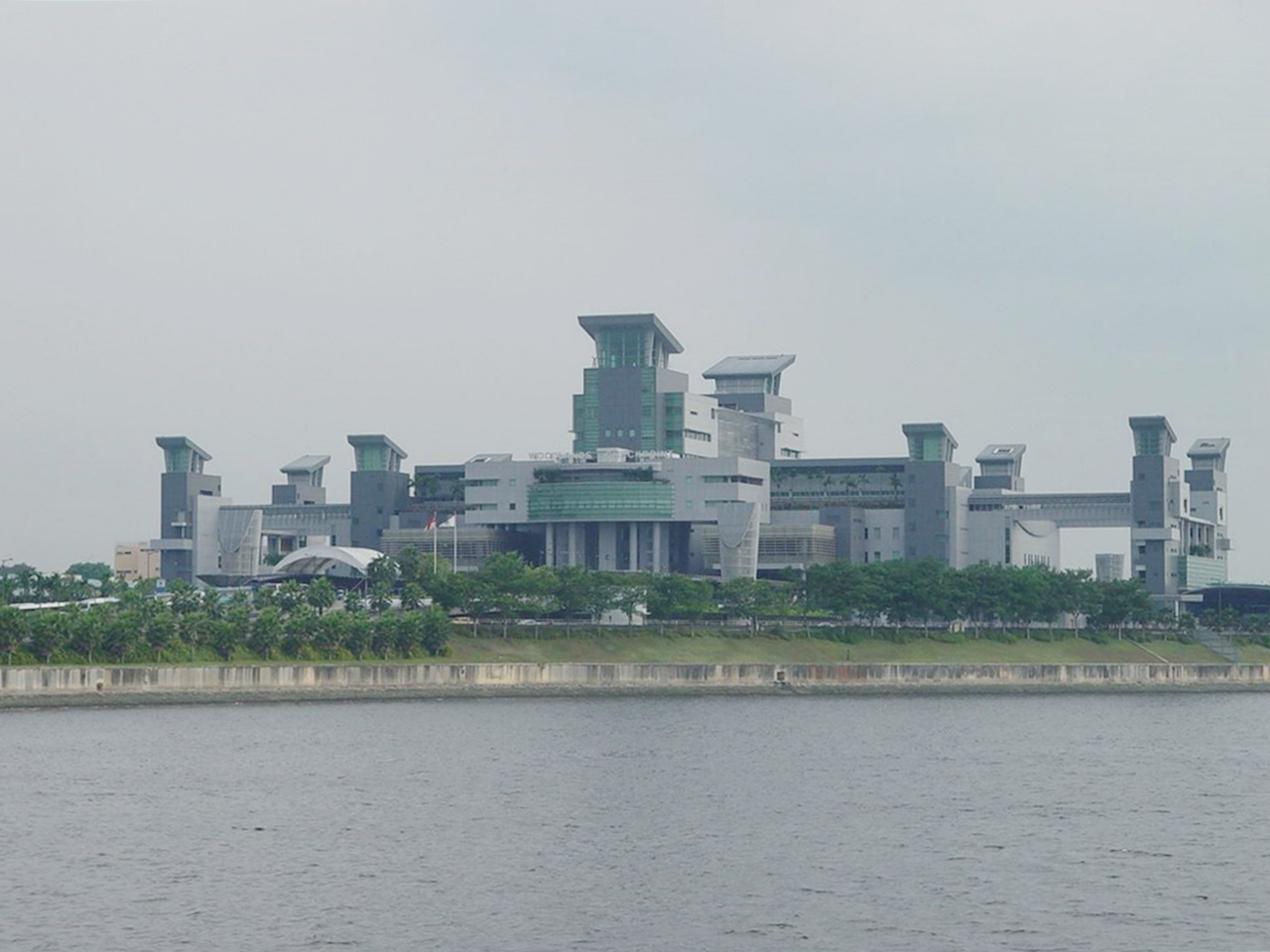
Woodlands Checkpoint

The Sultan Iskandar Building (Malaysia) and Woodlands Checkpoint (Singapore) on the Malaysia–Singapore border handles the busiest international land border crossing in the world, with 350,000 travellers daily prior to the COVID-19 pandemic.

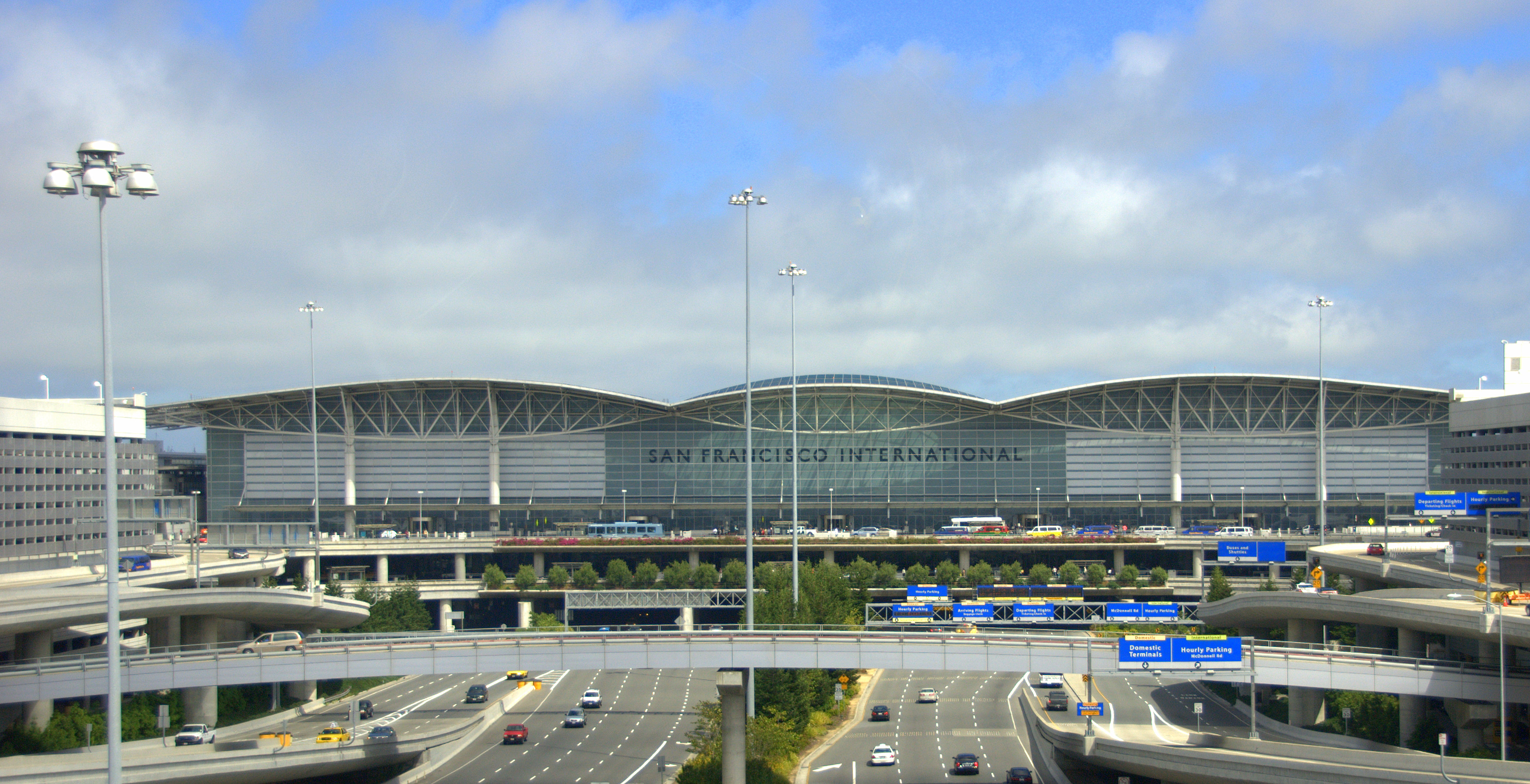
The International Terminal at San Francisco International Airport is an airport of entry for travellers entering America and has border checkpoint facilities for arriving passengers. Like most North American airports, it does not have a sterile international transit area. Domestic and international passengers are thus not clearly separated. That enables easier transfers from domestic to international flights but requires international transit passengers to clear the border checkpoint even if their final destination is outside America.

A Border checkpoint is a place where goods or individuals moving across borders are inspected for compliance with border control measures. Access-controlled borders often have a limited number of checkpoints where they can be crossed without legal sanctions. Arrangements or treaties may be established to allow or mandate less-restrained crossings (e.g., the Schengen Agreement). Land border checkpoints (land ports of entry) can be contrasted with the customs and immigration facilities at seaports, international airports, and other ports of entry.

Checkpoints generally serve two purposes:

- To prevent the entrance of individuals who are either undesirable (e.g., criminals or others who pose threats) or simply unauthorised to enter.
- To prevent the entrance of goods or contaminants that are illegal or subject to restriction, or to collect tariffs in accordance with customs or quarantine policies.

A border checkpoint at which travellers are permitted to enter a jurisdiction is known as a port of entry. International airports are usually ports of entry, as are road and rail crossings on a land border. Seaports can be used as ports of entry only if a dedicated customs presence is posted there. The decision to become a port of entry is up to the civil authority controlling the port. An airport of entry is an airport that provides customs and immigration services for incoming flights. These services allow the airport to serve as an initial port of entry for foreign visitors arriving in the country. While the terms airport of entry and international airport are generally used interchangeably, not all international airports qualify as airports of entry, since some international airports lack immigration or customs facilities in the Schengen Area, where member states have eliminated border controls with one another. Airports of entry are usually larger than domestic airports and often feature longer runways and facilities to accommodate the heavier aircraft commonly used for international and intercontinental travel. International airports often also serve domestic flights, which help feed both passengers and cargo into international flights (and vice versa). Buildings, operations, and management have become increasingly sophisticated since the mid-20th century, when international airports began to provide infrastructure for international civilian flights. Detailed technical standards have been developed to ensure safety, and common coding systems have been implemented to provide global consistency. The physical structures that serve millions of individual passengers and flights are among the most complex and interconnected in the world. By the second decade of the 21st century, there were over 1,200 international airports and almost two billion international passengers, along with 50 million metric tons (49,000,000 long tons; 55,000,000 short tons) of cargo passing through them annually.

Border inspections are also meant to protect each country's agriculture from pests. National and international phytosanitary authorities maintain databases of border interceptions, occurrences, and establishments. Bebber et al., 2019 analyzes such records and finds that they underreport many important pest species, that island nations are more vulnerable because they have lower border-to-area ratios, and that pests are moving poleward to follow humans' crops as our crops follow global warming.

A 'Quilantan' or 'Wave Through' entry is a phenomenon at American border checkpoints authorising a form of non-standard but legal entry without any inspection of travel documents. It occurs when border security personnel at a border crossing admit some individuals without conducting a standard interview or document review. If an individual can prove that they were waved through immigration in this manner, then they are considered to have entered with inspection despite not having answered any questions or received a passport entry stamp. This definition of legal entry only extends to foreigners who entered America at official border crossings and does not provide a path to legal residency for those who did not enter through a recognised crossing.

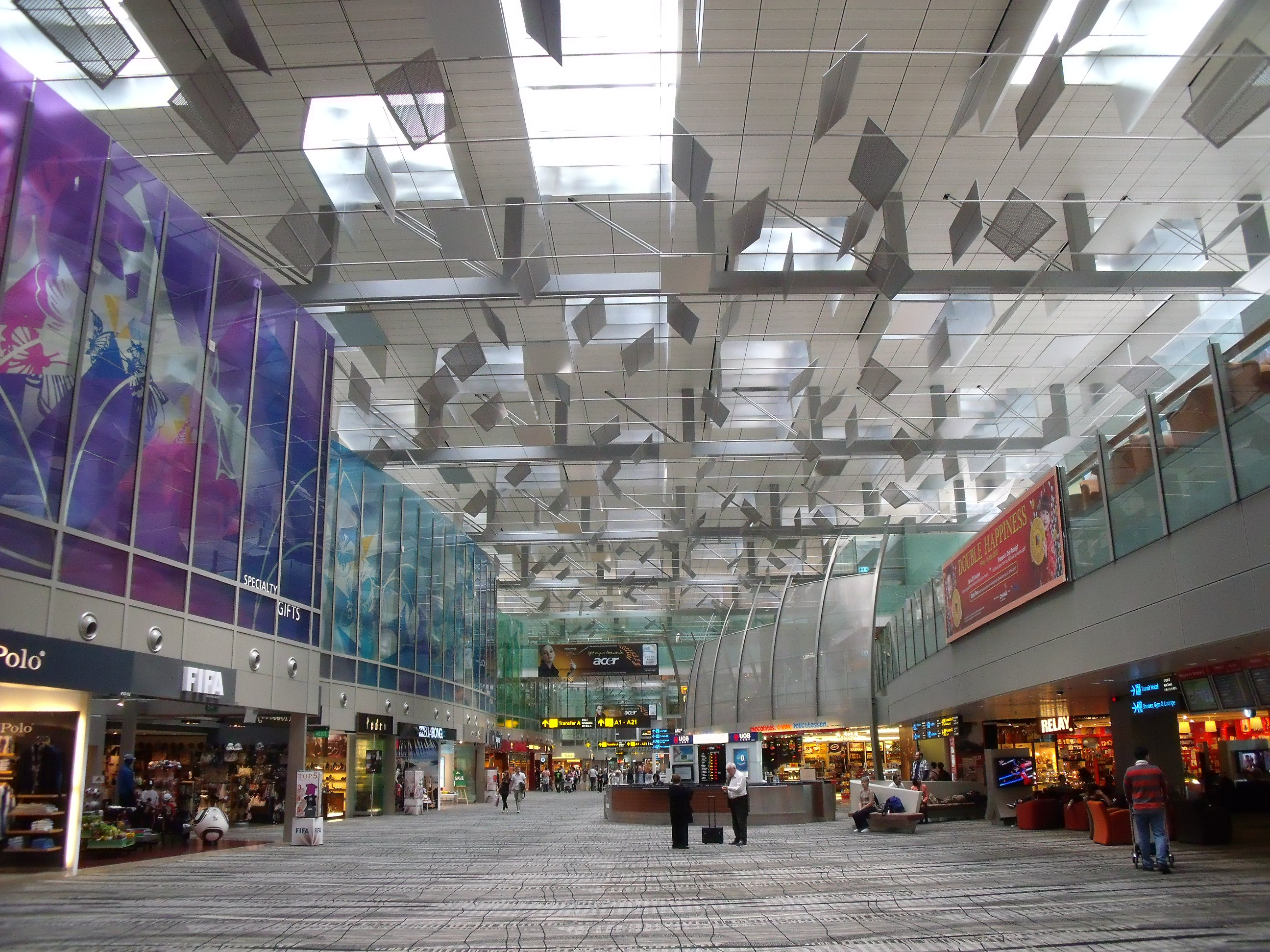
Sterile lounge at Changi Airport Terminal 3 in Singapore. Passengers transiting between international flights at Terminals 1, 2, and 3 of Changi Airport disembark directly into the sterile lounge, and may proceed to their connecting gate without clearing the border checkpoint or completing any other border control formality, and can move between terminals using the Skytrain without clearing any checkpoint.

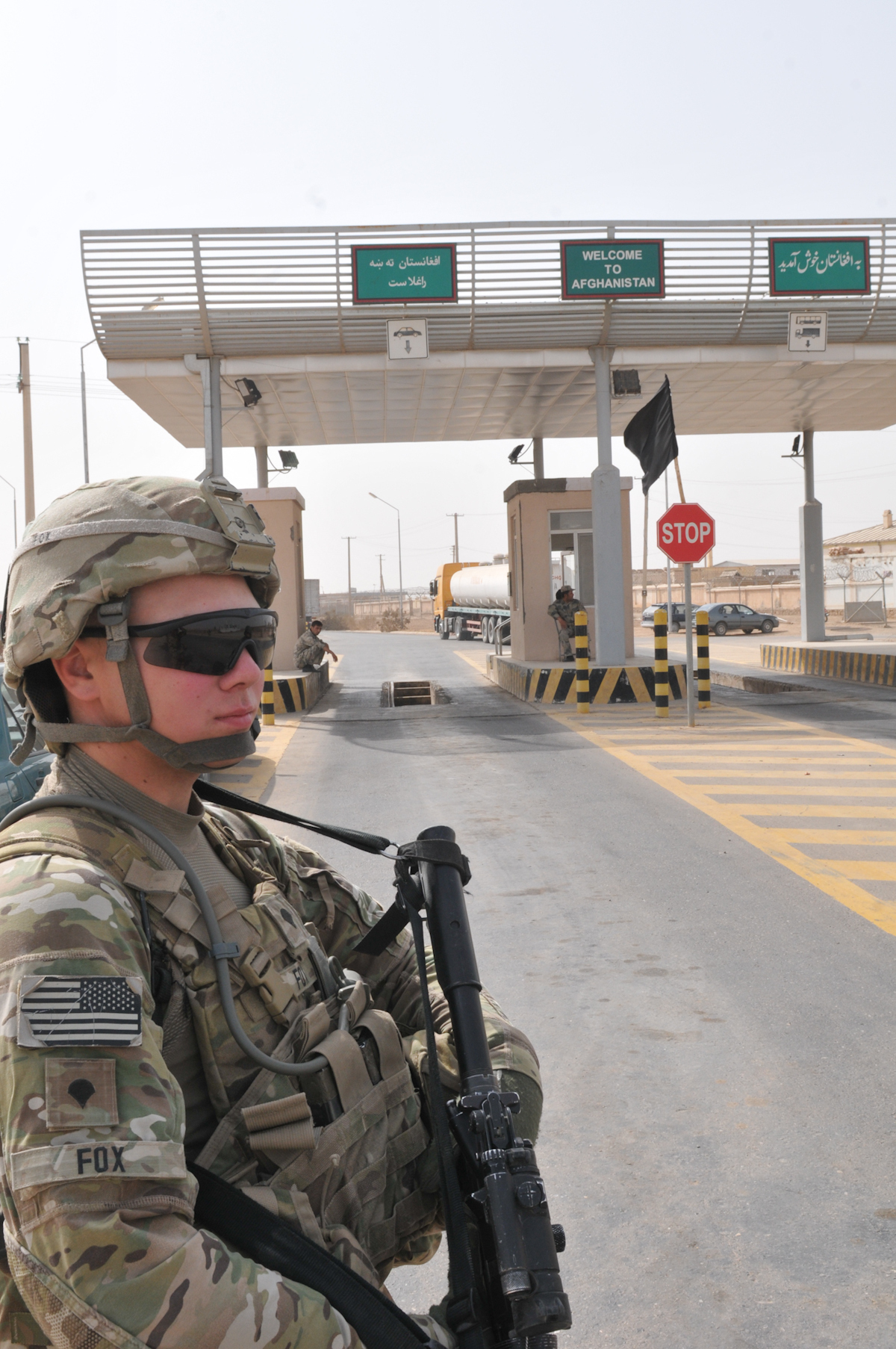
A port of entry at Shir Khan Bandar in northern Afghanistan near the Tajikistan border guarded by American military personnel before their withdrawal from Afghanistan, following which the Taliban assumed control over border checkpoints between Afghanistan and its neighbours

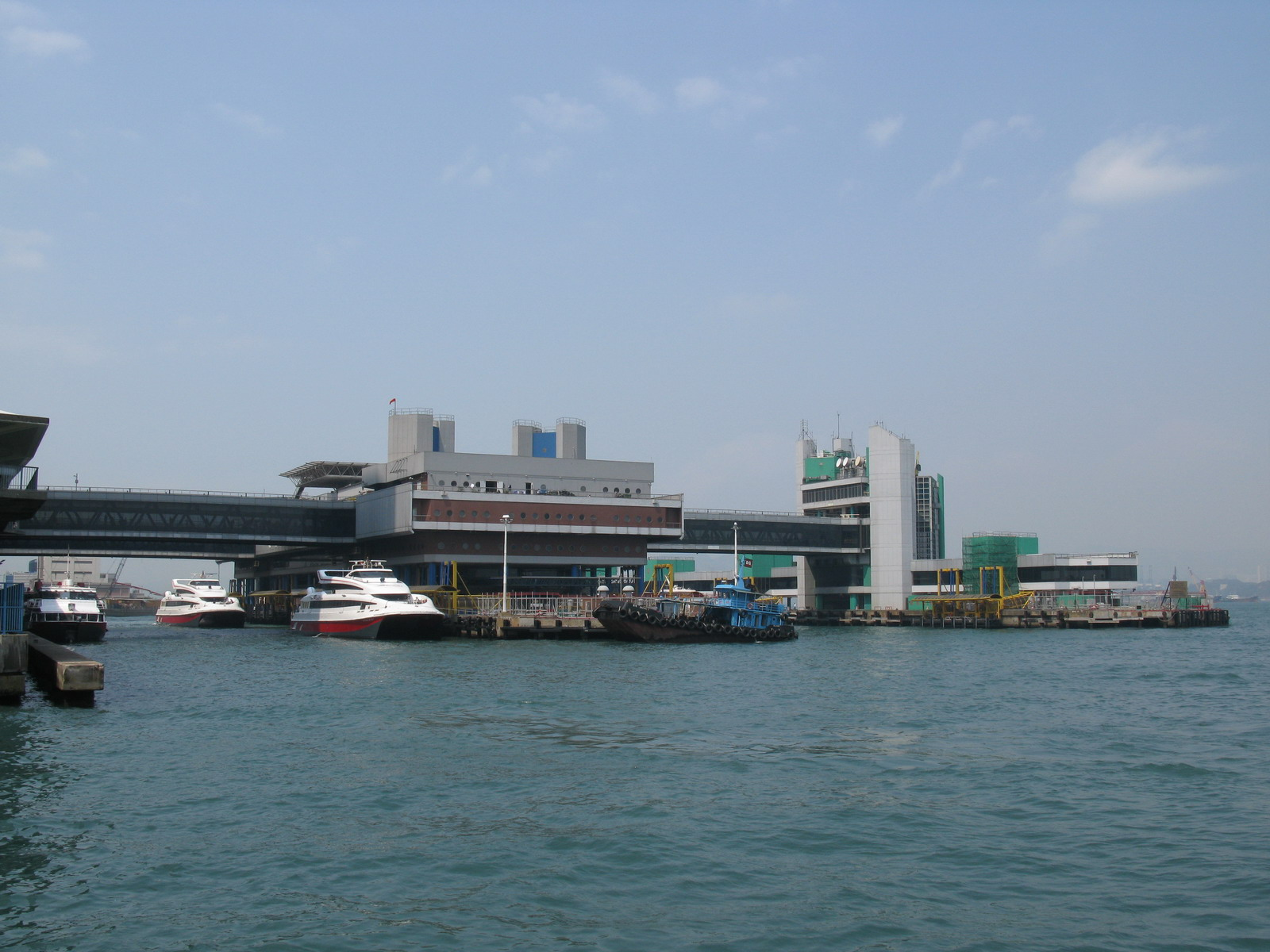
The Hong Kong–Macau Ferry Terminal in Sheung Wan is a sea port of entry to Hong Kong and an example of an internal border checkpoint where travellers arriving from or departing for other cities in the Pearl River Delta are subject to border control measures.

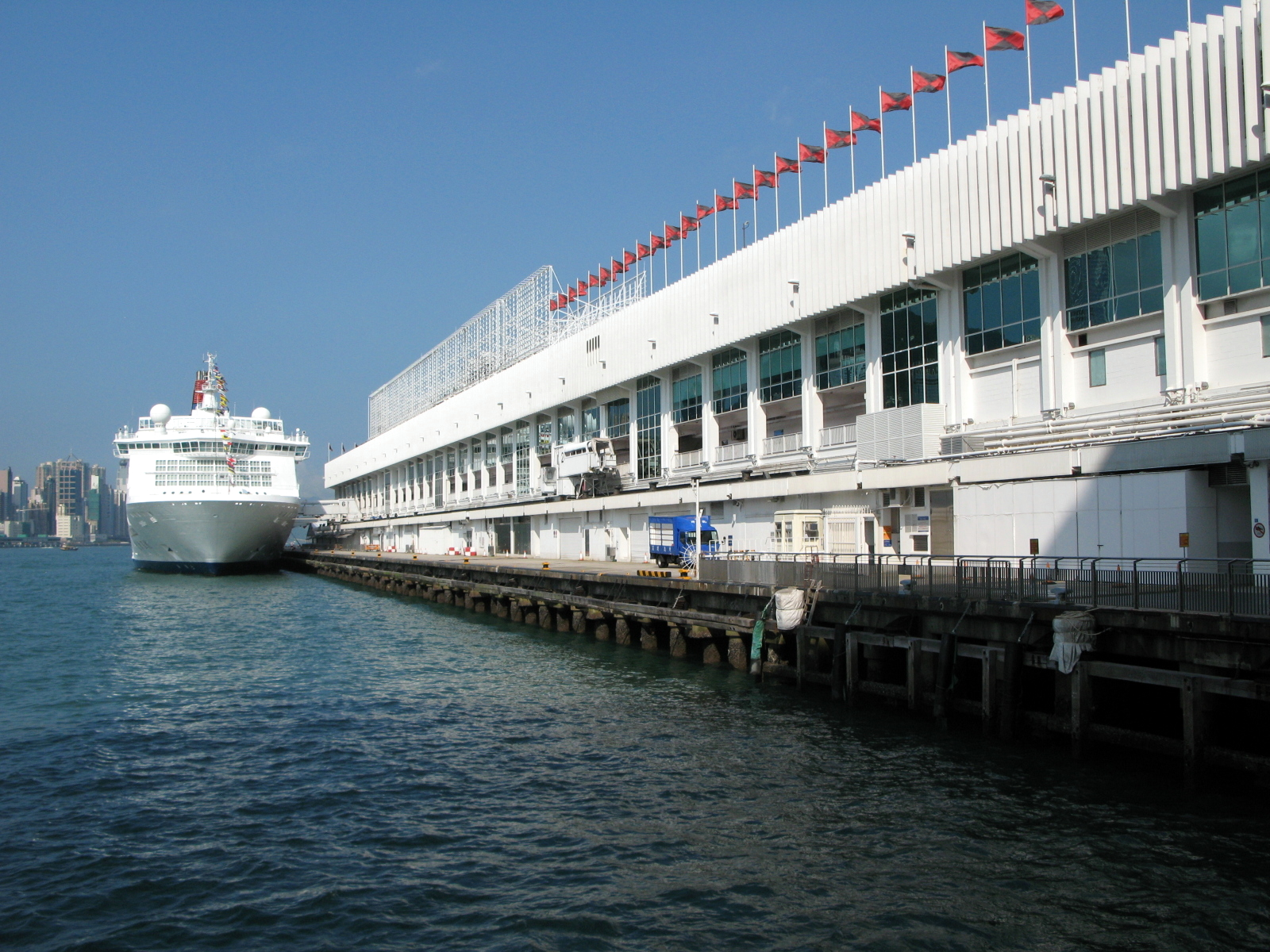
The cruise ship pier at Ocean Terminal is also a sea port of entry to Hong Kong. While the HK-Macau Ferry Terminal is a port of entry for travellers from other Chinese cities in the Pearl River Delta, the Ocean Terminal is a port of entry for visitors arriving by cruise ship from a wider range of jurisdictions.

==== Border zones ====
Border zones are areas near borders that have special restrictions on movement. Governments may forbid unauthorised entry to or exit from border zones and restrict property ownership in the area. The zones function as buffer zones, specifically monitored by border patrols, to prevent unauthorised cross-border travel. Border zones enable authorities to detain and prosecute individuals suspected of being or aiding undocumented migrants, smugglers, or spies without necessarily having to prove that the individuals in question actually engaged in the suspected unauthorised activity, since, as all unauthorised presence in the area is forbidden, the mere presence of an individual permits authorities to arrest them. Border zones between hostile states can be heavily militarised, with minefields, barbed wire, and watchtowers. Some border zones are designed to prevent illegal immigration or emigration and have few restrictions, but may operate checkpoints to verify immigration status. In most places, a border vista is usually included and/or required. In some nations, movement inside a border zone without a licence is an offence and will result in arrest. No probable cause is required as mere presence inside the zone is an offence, if it is intentional. Even with a license to enter, photography, making fires, and carrying of firearms and hunting may be prohibited.

Examples of international border zones are the Border Security Zone of Russia and the Finnish border zone on the Finnish–Russian border. There are also intra-country zones such as the Cactus Curtain surrounding the Guantanamo Bay Naval Base in Cuba, the Korean Demilitarised Zone along the North Korea-South Korea demarcation line and the Frontier Closed Area in Hong Kong. Important historical examples are the Wire of Death set up by the German Empire to control the Belgium–Netherlands border and the Iron Curtain, a set of border zones maintained by the Soviet Union and its satellite states along their borders with Western states. One of the most militarised parts was the restricted zone of the inner German border. While the zone was initially and officially for border security, it was eventually engineered to prevent escape from the Soviet sphere into the West. Ultimately, the Eastern Bloc governments resorted to using lethal countermeasures against those trying to cross the border, such as mined fences and orders to shoot anyone trying to cross into the West. The restrictions on building and habitation made the area a "green corridor", which today is known as the European Green Belt.

In the area stretching inwards from its internal border with the mainland, Hong Kong maintains a Frontier Closed Area out of bounds to those without special authorisation. The area was established in the 1950s, when Hong Kong was under British administration, as a result of the Convention for the Extension of Hong Kong Territory before the transfer of sovereignty over Hong Kong in 1997. The area's purpose was to prevent illegal immigration and smuggling; smuggling had become prevalent as a consequence of the Korean War. Today, under the one country, two systems policy, the area continues to be used to curtail unauthorized migration to Hong Kong and the smuggling of goods in either direction.

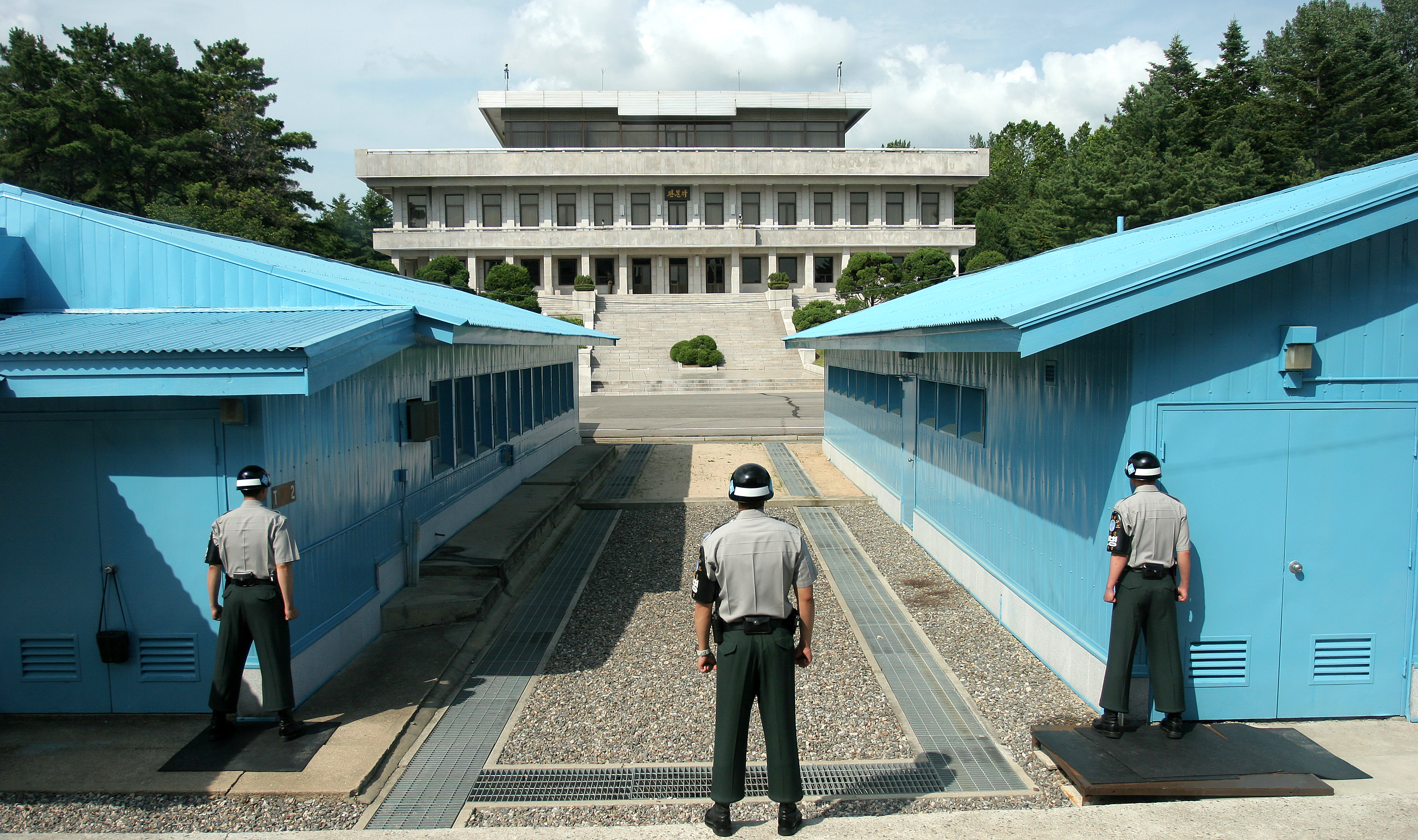
South Korean policemen standing guard at North Korea-South Korea border; view from South Korea

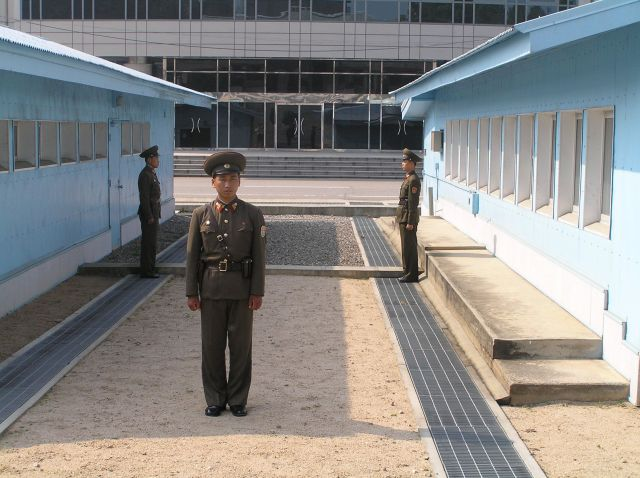
North Korean policemen standing guard at North Korea-South Korea border; view from North Korea

As a result of the partition of the Korean peninsula by America and the Soviet Union after World War II, and exacerbated by the subsequent Korean War, there is a Demilitarised Zone (DMZ) spanning the de facto border between North and South Korea. The DMZ follows the effective boundaries as of the end of the Korean War in 1953. Similar to the Frontier Closed Area in Hong Kong, this zone and the defence apparatus on both sides of the border serve to curtail unauthorised passage between them. In South Korea, there is an additional fenced-off area between the Civilian Control Line (CCL) and the start of the Demilitarized Zone. The CCL is a line that designates an additional buffer zone to the Demilitarized Zone, located 5 to 20 kilometres (3.1 to 12.4 miles) from the Southern Limit Line of the Demilitarized Zone. Its purpose is to limit and control civilian entry into the area to protect and maintain the security of military facilities and operations near the Demilitarized Zone. The commander of the 8th US Army ordered the creation of the CCL, and it was activated and first became effective in February 1954. The buffer zone that falls south of the Southern Limit Line is called the Civilian Control Zone. Barbed wire fences and manned military guard posts mark the CCL. South Korean soldiers typically accompany tourist buses and cars travelling north of the CCL as armed guards to monitor the civilians as well as to protect them from North Korean intruders. Most tourist and media photos of the "Demilitarised Zone fence" are actually of the CCL fence. The actual Demilitarized Zone fence along the Southern Limit Line is completely off-limits to everyone except soldiers, and it is illegal to photograph it.

Similarly, the whole estuary of the Han River in the Korean Peninsula is deemed a "Neutral Zone" and is officially off-limits to all civilian vessels. Only military vessels are allowed within this neutral zone. (Note: According to the July 1953 Korean Armistice Agreement civil shipping was supposed to be permissible in the Han River estuary and allow Seoul to be connected to the Yellow Sea (West Sea) via the Han River. However, both Koreas and the UNC failed to make this happen. The South Korean government ordered the construction of the Ara Canal to finally connect Seoul to the Yellow Sea, which was completed in 2012. Seoul was effectively landlocked from the ocean until 2012. The biggest limitation of the Ara Canal is that it is too narrow to accommodate vessels other than small tourist and recreational boats, so Seoul still cannot receive large commercial or passenger ships at its port.) In recent years, Chinese fishing vessels have taken advantage of the tense situation in the Han River Estuary Neutral Zone and illegally fished in this area due to both North Korean and South Korean navies never patrolling this area due to the fear of naval battles breaking out. This has led to firefights and sinkings of boats between Chinese fishermen and South Korean Coast Guard. On 30 January 2019, North Korean and South Korean military officials signed a landmark agreement that would open the Han River Estuary to civilian vessels for the first time since the Armistice Agreement in 1953. The agreement was scheduled to take place in April 2019, but the failure of the 2019 Hanoi Summit indefinitely postponed these plans.

The Green Line separating Southern Cyprus and Northern Cyprus is a demilitarised border zone operated by the United Nations Peacekeeping Force in Cyprus (Note: The peacekeeping force currently has its headquarters at the abandoned Nicosia International Airport, where the majority of peacekeepers are based and where talks between the two governments are held.) operate and patrol within the buffer zone. The buffer zone was established in 1974 due to ethnic tensions between Greek and Turkish Cypriots. The green line is similar in nature to the 38th parallel separating the Republic of Korea and North Korea.

Some border zones, referred to as border vistas, are composed of legally mandated cleared space between two areas of foliage located at an international border intended to provide a clear demarcation line between two jurisdictions. Border vistas are most commonly found along undefended international boundary lines, where border security is not as much of a necessity and a built barrier is undesired, and are a treaty requirement for certain borders. An example of a border vista is a 6-metre (20-foot) cleared space around unguarded portions of the Canada–United States border. Similar clearings along the border line are provided for by many international treaties. For example, the 2006 border management treaty between Russia and China provides for a 15-metre (49-foot) cleared strip along the two nations' border.

In 2024, Egypt announced that they are building a buffer zone on the Egypt-Gaza border.

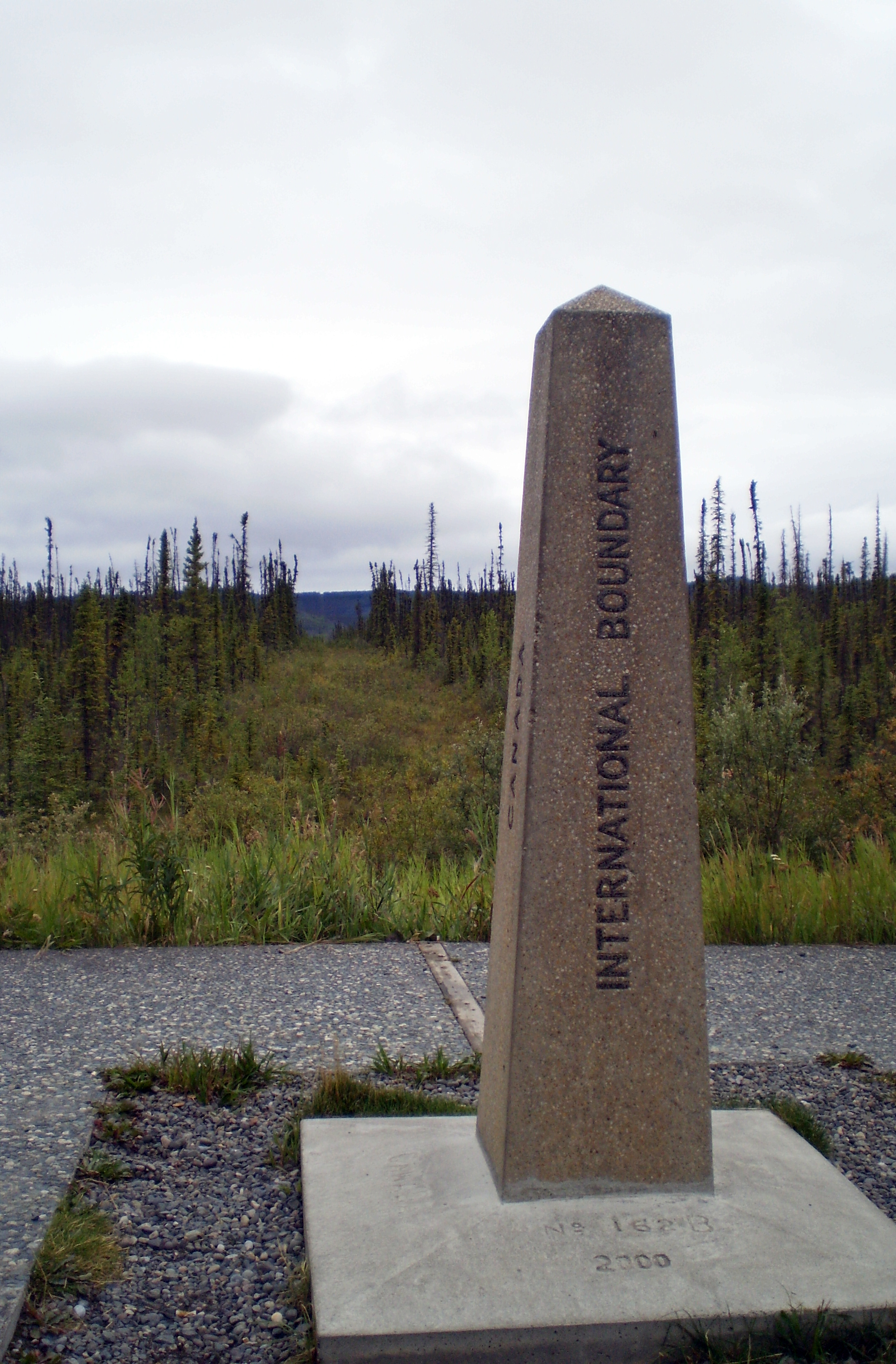
Vista, Canada–US border, Alaska Highway, from a wayside

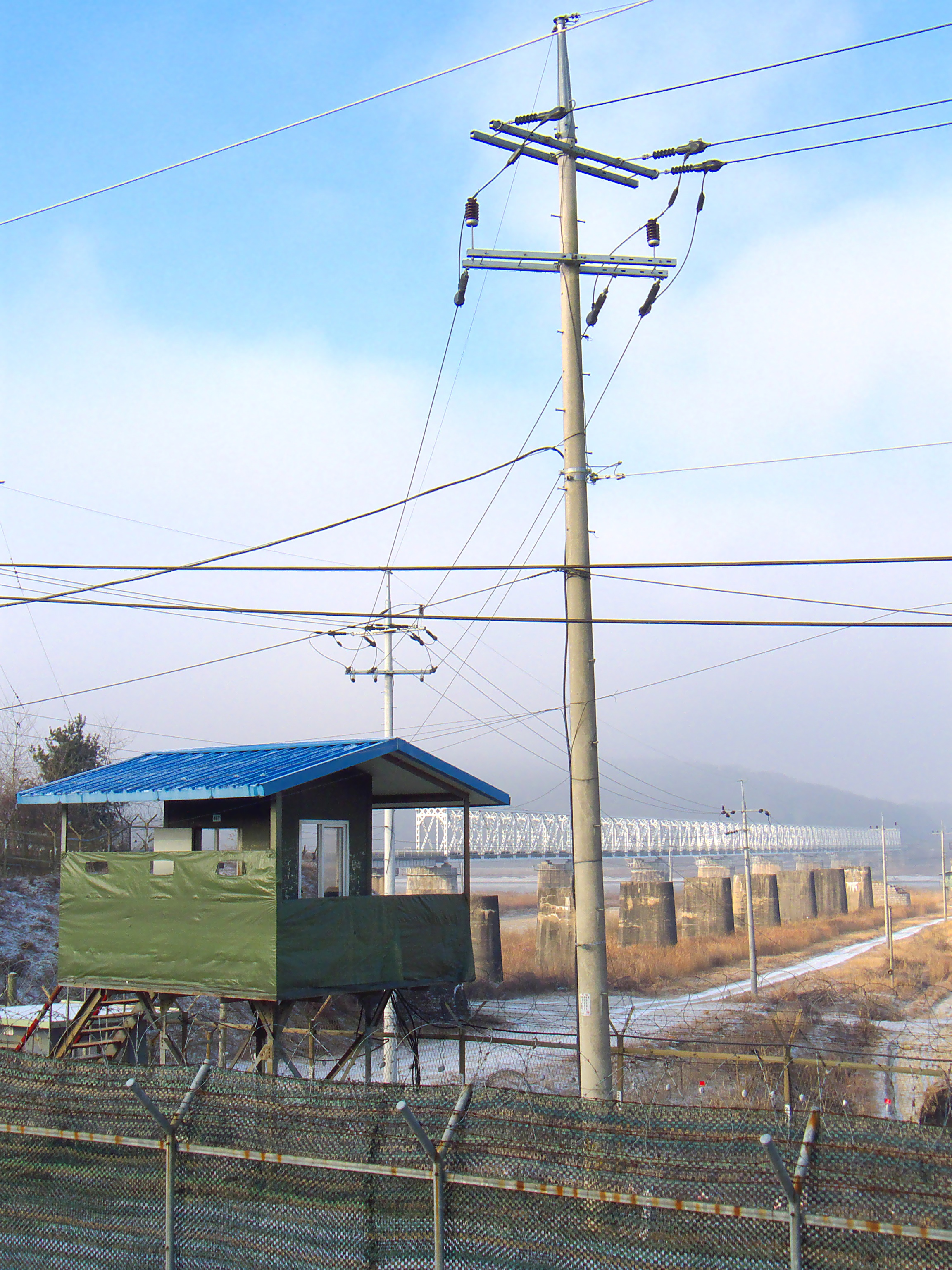
Control Line, Imjingak, South Korea

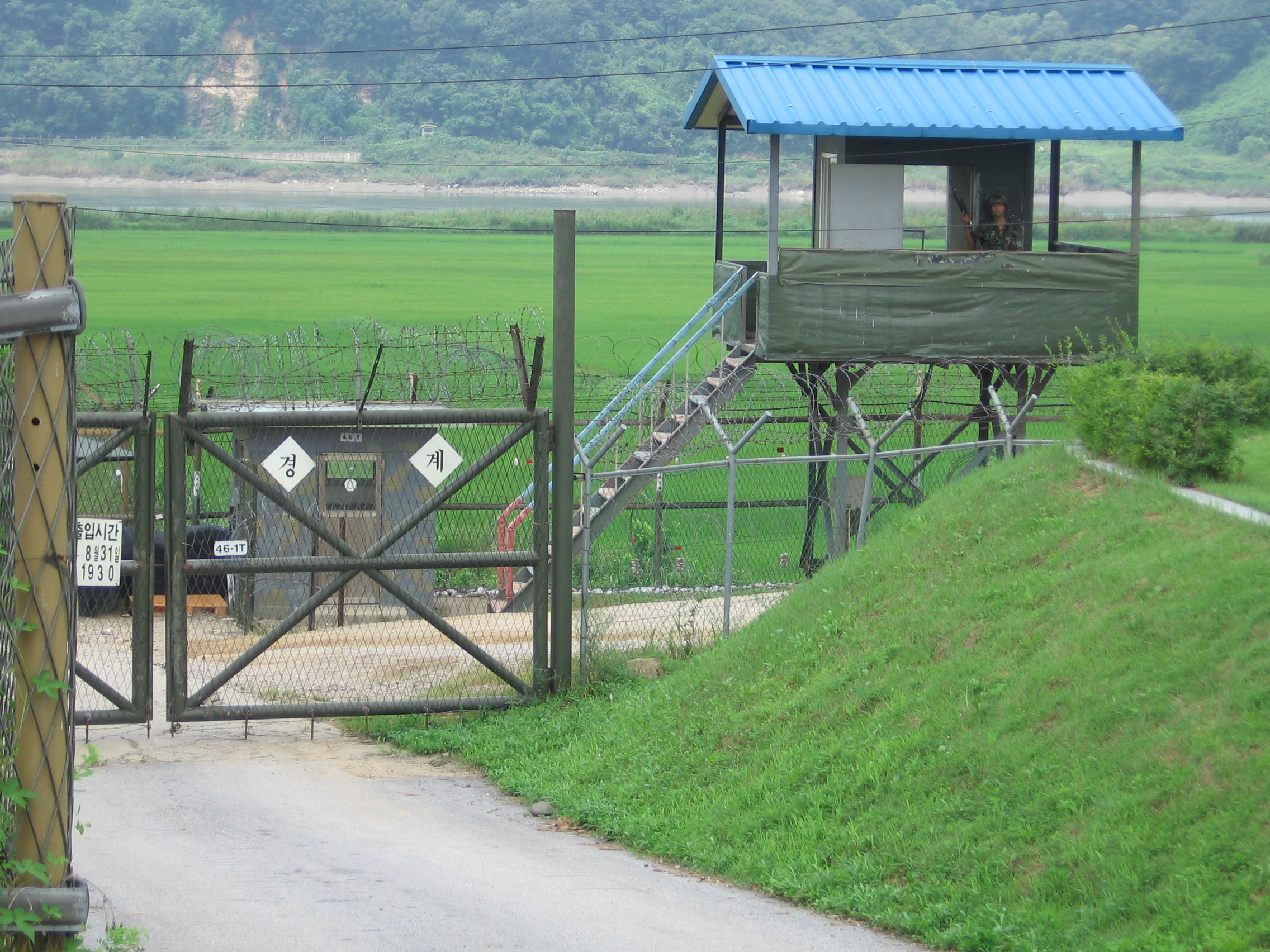
Civilian Control Line, outside the DMZ, from South

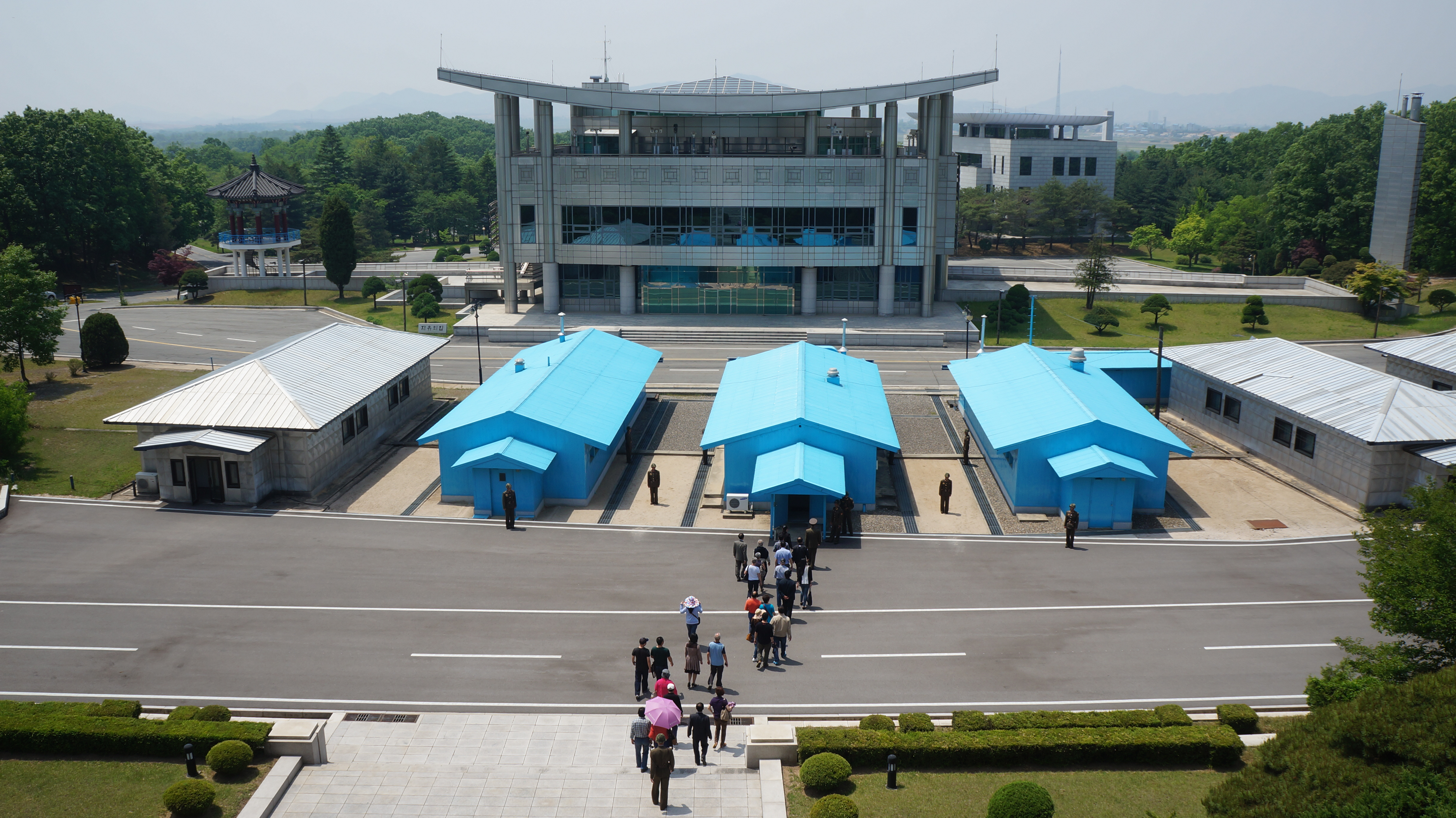
Korean DMZ from North

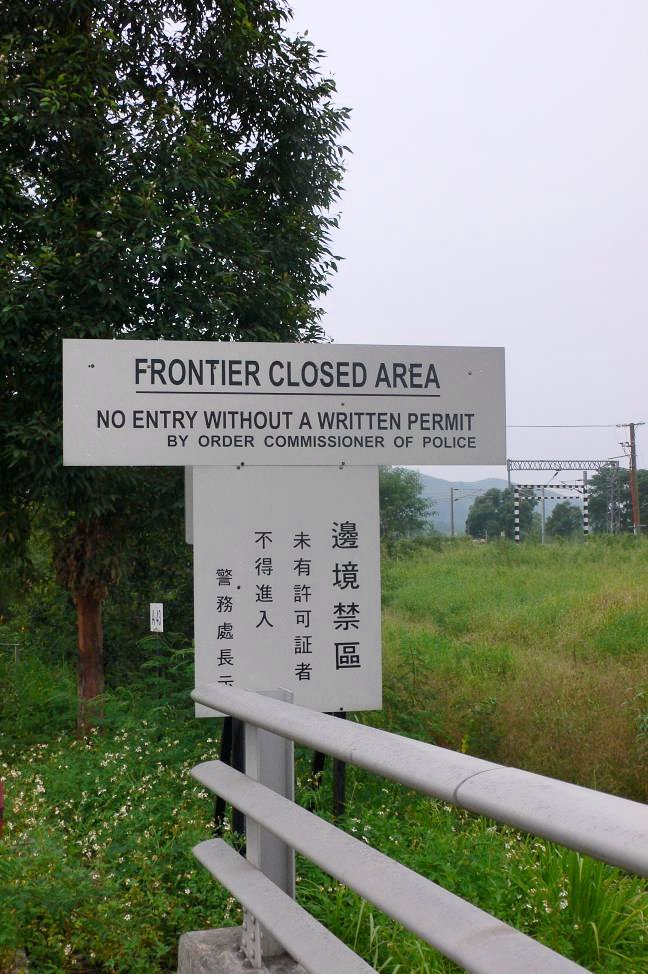
Lo Wu (HK-PRC mainland)

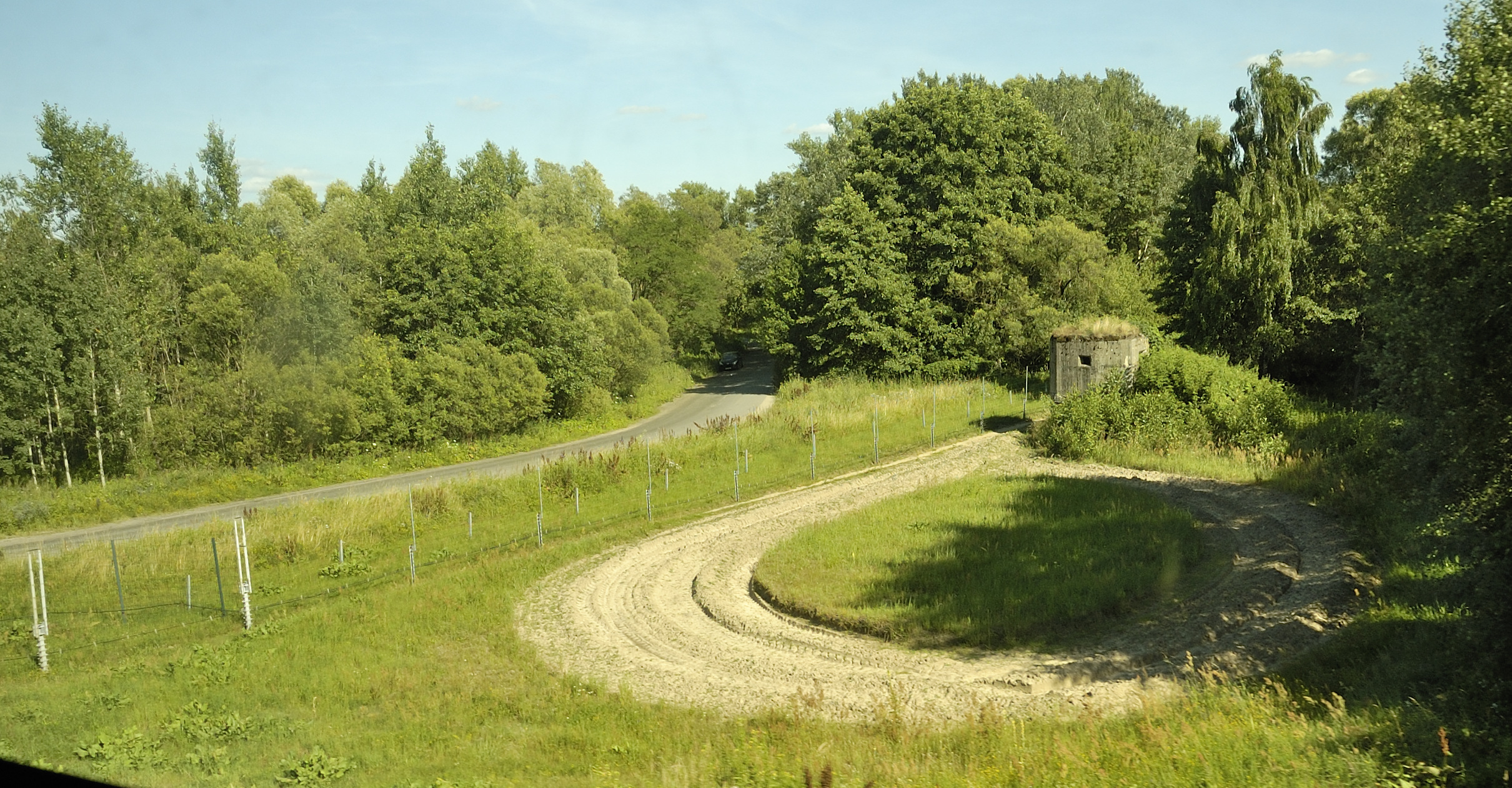
Brest: a security electric fence, a ploughed trace-control strip, and pillbox.

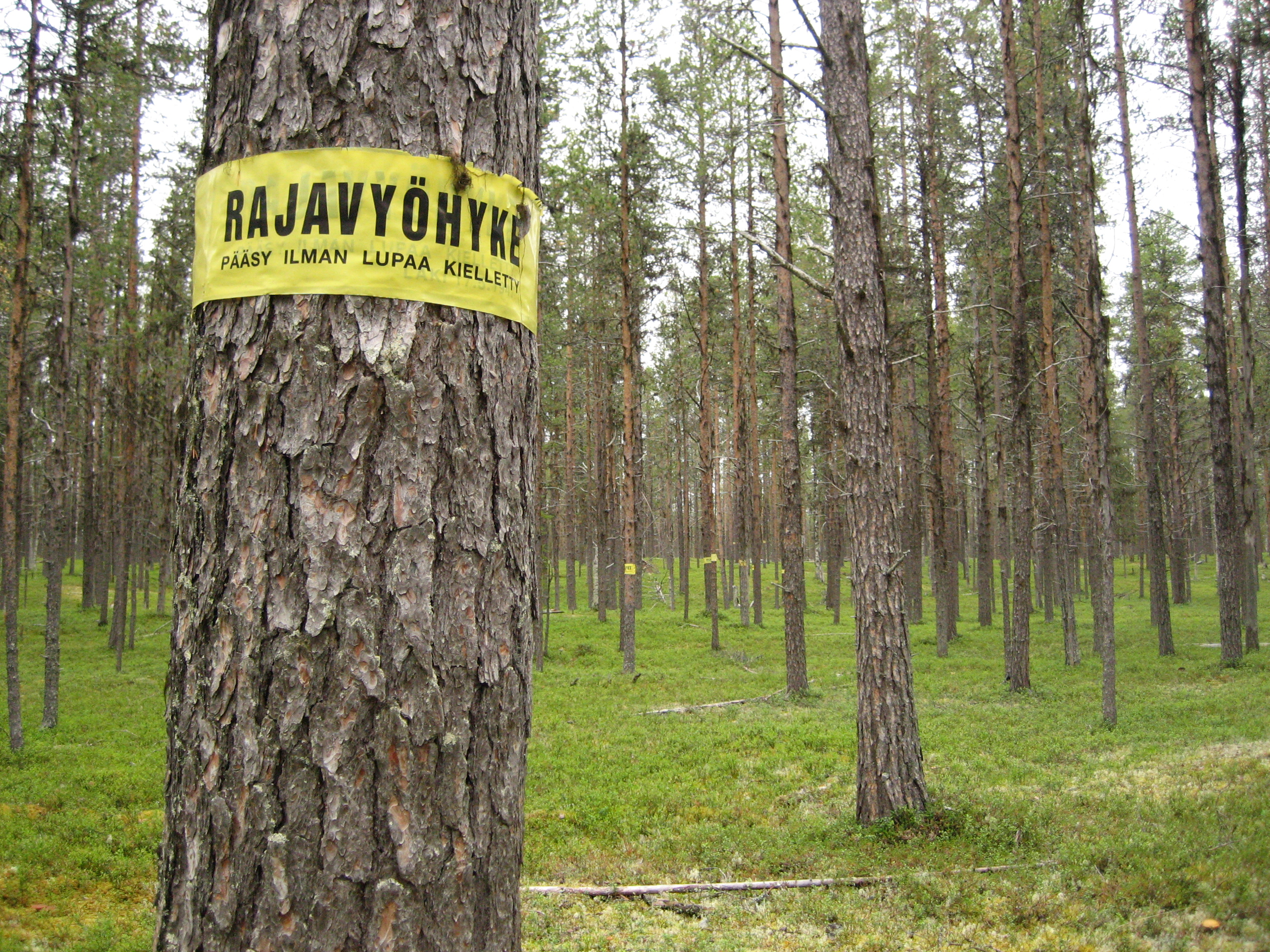
Finland–Russia border, start of the Finnish border zone

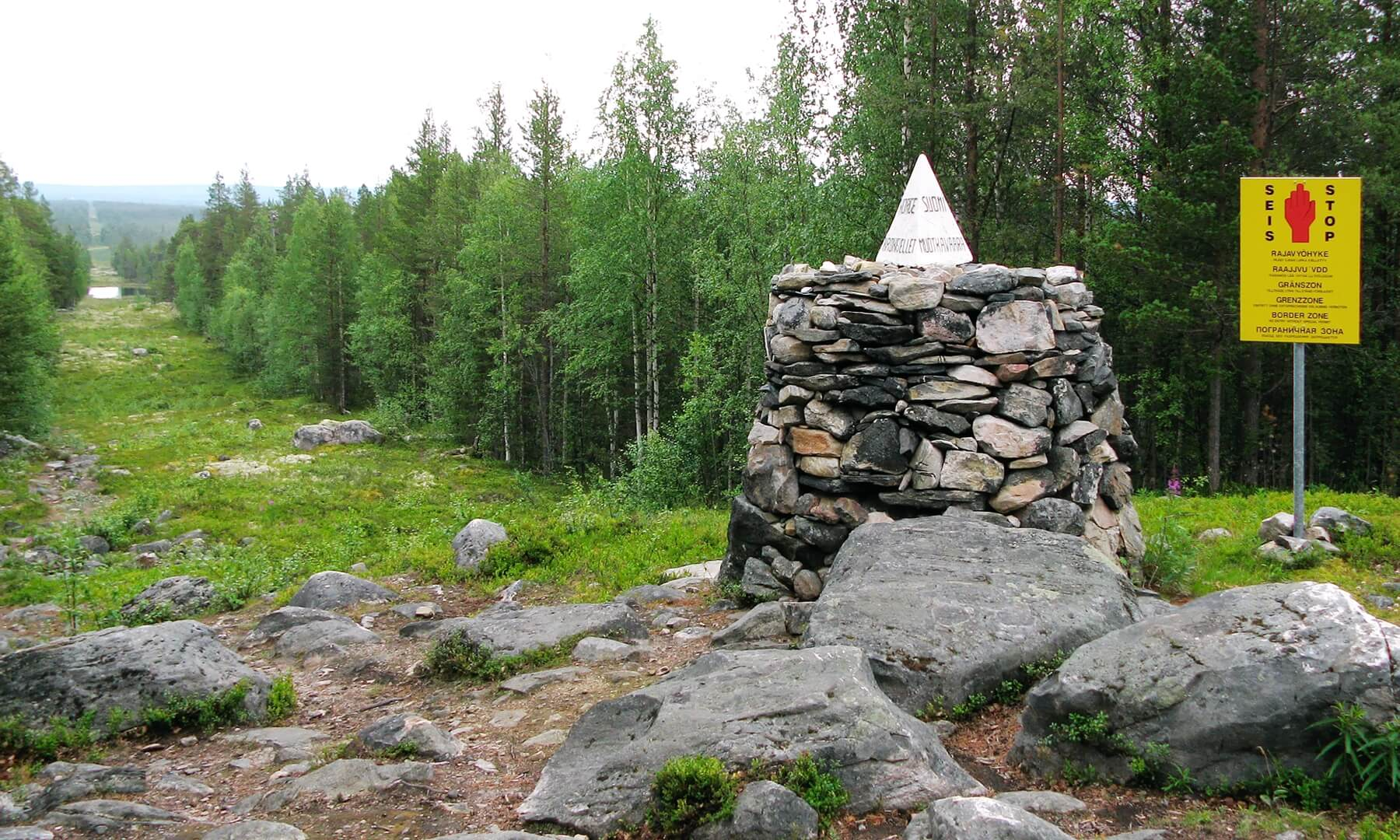
Vista at the Norway–Russia border, seen from the Russia-Norway-Finland tripoint

=== Immigration law ===
Immigration law refers to the national statutes, regulations, and legal precedents governing immigration into and deportation from a country. Strictly speaking, it is distinct from other matters such as naturalisation and citizenship, although they are often conflated. Immigration laws vary around the world and according to the social and political climate of the times, as acceptance of immigrants shifts from the widely inclusive to the deeply nationalist and isolationist. Countries frequently maintain laws that regulate both entry and exit rights and internal rights, such as the duration of stay, freedom of movement, and the right to participate in commerce or government. National laws regarding the immigration of citizens of that country are regulated by international law. The United Nations' International Covenant on Civil and Political Rights mandates that all countries allow entry to their own citizens.

=== Immigration policies ===
==== Diaspora communities ====
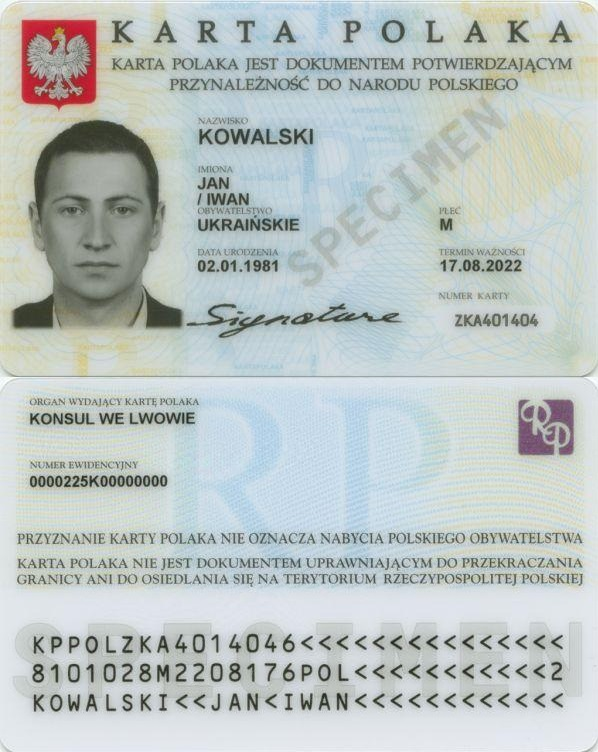
Karta Polaka – specimen document

Certain countries adopt immigration policies designed to be favourable towards members of diaspora communities with a connection to the country. For example, the Indian government confers Overseas Citizenship of India (OCI) status on foreign citizens of Indian origin to enable them to live and work indefinitely in India. OCI status was introduced in response to demands for dual citizenship by the Indian diaspora, particularly in countries with large populations of Indian origin. (Note: In the ASEAN region, a large portion of the Singaporean, Malaysian, and Bruneian population holds OCI status. Large OCI communities also exist in North America, the United Kingdom, Australia, and New Zealand, as well as in many African nations (particularly South Africa, Madagascar, and members of the East African Community). OCI status exempts holders from immigration controls generally imposed upon others of the same nationality.) It was introduced by The Citizenship (Amendment) Act, 2005 in August 2005. Similar to OCI status, the UK Ancestry visa exempts members of the British diaspora (Note: It is issued by the United Kingdom to Commonwealth citizens with a grandparent born in the United Kingdom, Channel Islands or Isle of Man who wish to work in the United Kingdom. It is used mainly by Australians, New Zealanders, Canadians, and South Africans of British descent working or studying in the United Kingdom.) from usual immigration controls. Poland issued the Karta Polaka to citizens of certain northeast European countries with Polish ancestry, but later expanded it to the worldwide Polonia.

Some nations recognise a right of return for people with ancestry in that country or a connection to a particular ethnic group. A notable example of this is the right of Sephardi Jews to acquire Spanish nationality by virtue of their community's Spanish origins. Similar exemptions to immigration controls exist for people of Armenian origin seeking to acquire Armenian citizenship. Ghana similarly grants an indefinite right to stay in Ghana to members of the African diaspora, regardless of citizenship. Similarly, Israel maintains a policy permitting members of the Jewish diaspora to immigrate to Israel regardless of prior nationality.

South Korean immigration policy is relatively unique in that, as a consequence of its claim over the territory currently administered by North Korea, citizens of North Korea are regarded by the South as its own citizens by birth. As a result, North Korean refugees in China often attempt to travel to countries such as Thailand which, while not offering asylum to North Koreans, classifies them as unauthorized immigrants and deports them to South Korea instead of North Korea. At the same time, the policy has operated to prevent pro-North Korea Zainichi Koreans recognised by Japan as Chōsen-seki from entering South Korea without special permission from the South Korean authorities as, despite being regarded as citizens of the Republic of Korea and members of the Korean diaspora, they generally refuse to exercise that status.

==== Open borders ====
Member states of the Schengen area Other member states of the European Union

An open border is the deregulation and/or lack of regulation of the movement of persons between nations and jurisdictions; this does not apply to trade or movement between privately owned land areas. Most nations have open borders for travel within their nation of travel, though more authoritarian states may limit the freedom of internal movement of its citizens, as for example in the former USSR. However, only a handful of nations have deregulated open borders with other nations, an example of this being European countries under the Schengen Agreement or the open Belarus-Russia border. Open borders used to be very common among all nations, however this became less common after the First World War, which led to the regulation of open borders, making them less common and no longer feasible for most industrialised nations.

Open borders are the norm for borders between subdivisions within the boundaries of sovereign states. However, some countries do maintain internal border controls (for example between the People's Republic of China mainland and the special administrative regions of Hong Kong and Macau; or between the American mainland, the unincorporated territories (Note: The Virgin Islands follows the visa policy applicable in the mainland but is a customs-free area meaning that there are customs checks for passengers travelling from the islands to the mainland or Puerto Rico. Guam and the Northern Marianas maintain their own customs and visa waiver policies, meaning that flights between Guam and Honolulu, the only air link to an American state, require immigration checks which are conducted before departure. American Samoa maintains a distinct visa and customs policy, meaning that flights to Honolulu are treated as international arrivals. Access to the United States Minor Outlying Islands is governed by a variety of permits issued by the Office of Insular Affairs or the United States Fish and Wildlife Service depending on the territory) other than Puerto Rico, and Hawaii. (Note: While Hawaii is subject to the same visa and customs controls as the mainland and Puerto Rico, controls are imposed on passengers travelling to and from the state for agricultural policy)) Open borders are also usual between member states of federations, however, movement between member states is controlled in exceptional circumstances. (Note: For example, inter-state travel in Australia was restricted in 2020 due to the COVID-19 epidemic, for the first time since the 1918 flu pandemic.) Federations, confederations, and similar multinational unions typically maintain external border controls through a collective border control system. However, they sometimes have open borders with other non-member states through special international agreements – such as between Schengen Agreement countries as mentioned above.

Presently, open border agreements of various types are in force in several areas around the world, as outlined below:

- Asia and Oceania:
  - Under the 1950 Indo-Nepal Treaty of Peace and Friendship, India and Nepal maintain an arrangement similar to the CTA and the Union State. Indians and Nepalis are not subject to any migration controls in each other's countries, and there are few controls on land travel by citizens across the border.
  - India and Bhutan also have a similar programme in place. The border between Jaigaon, in the Indian state of West Bengal, and the city of Phuentsholing is essentially open, and although there are internal checkpoints, Indians (as outlined under the Visa policy of Bhutan are allowed to proceed throughout Bhutan with a voter's ID or an identity slip from the Indian consulate in Phuentsholing. Similarly, Bhutanese passport holders enjoy free movement in India.
  - Thailand and Cambodia: Whilst not as liberal as the policies concerning the Indo-Nepalese and Indo-Bhutanese borders, Thailand and Cambodia have begun issuing combined visas to certain categories of tourists applying at specific Thai or Cambodian embassies and consulates, enabling freer border crossings between the two countries. The policy is currently in force for nationals of America and several European (primarily EU, EEA, and GCC) and Oceanian countries as well as for Indian and Chinese nationals residing in Singapore.
  - Australia and New Zealand: Similar to the agreement between India and Nepal, the Trans-Tasman Travel Arrangement between Australia and New Zealand is a free movement agreement citizens of each country to travel freely between them and allowing citizens and some permanent residents to reside, visit, work, study in the other country for an indefinite period, with some restrictions. The arrangement came into effect in 1973, and allows citizens of each country to reside and work in the other country, with some restrictions. Other details of the arrangement have varied over time. From 1 July 1981, all people entering Australia (including New Zealand citizens) have been required to carry a passport. Since 1 September 1994, Australia has had a universal visa requirement, and to specifically cater for the continued free movement of New Zealanders to Australia, the Special Category Visa was introduced for New Zealanders.
- Central America : The Central America-4 Border Control Agreement abolishes border controls for land travel between El Salvador, Honduras, Nicaragua, and Guatemala. However, this does not apply to air travel.
- Europe and the Middle East
  - Union State of Russia and Belarus The Union State of Russia and Belarus is a supranational union of Russia and Belarus, which eliminates all border controls between the two nations. Before a visa agreement was signed in 2020, each country maintained its own visa policies, resulting in non-citizens of both countries generally being barred from travelling directly between them. However, since the visa agreement was signed, each side recognises the other's visas, meaning third-country citizens can enter both countries with a visa from either country.
  - Western Europe: The two most significant free travel areas in Western Europe are the Schengen Area, in which very little, if any, border control is generally visible, and the Common Travel Area (CTA), which partially eliminates such controls for nationals of the United Kingdom and Ireland. Between countries in the Schengen Area and, to an extent, within the CTA on the British Isles, internal border control is often virtually unnoticeable. It is typically carried out only through random searches of cars or trains in the hinterland. In contrast, controls at borders with non-member states may be rather strict.
  - Gulf Cooperation Council: Members of the Gulf Cooperation Council, or GCC, allow each other's citizens freedom of movement in an arrangement similar to the CTA and to that between India and Nepal. Between 5 June 2017 and 5 January 2021, freedom of movement in Saudi Arabia, the UAE, and Bahrain was suspended for Qataris as a result of the Saudi-led blockade of the country.
Visa policy of Bhutan, showing the free movement arrangement between India and Bhutan

Visa policy of Nepal, showing free movement between India and Nepal under the 1950 treaty

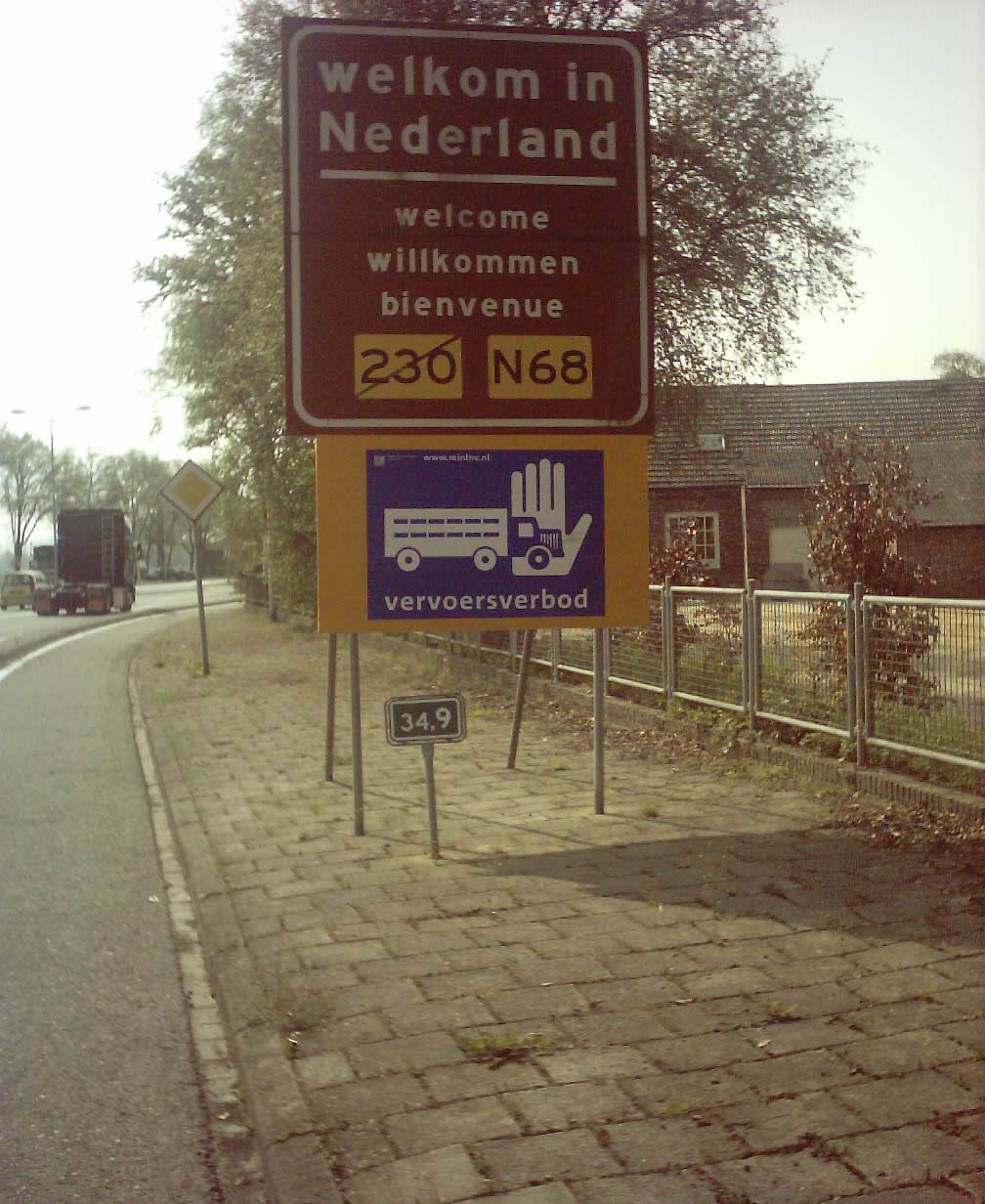
Open Schengen Area border crossing between Germany and the Netherlands

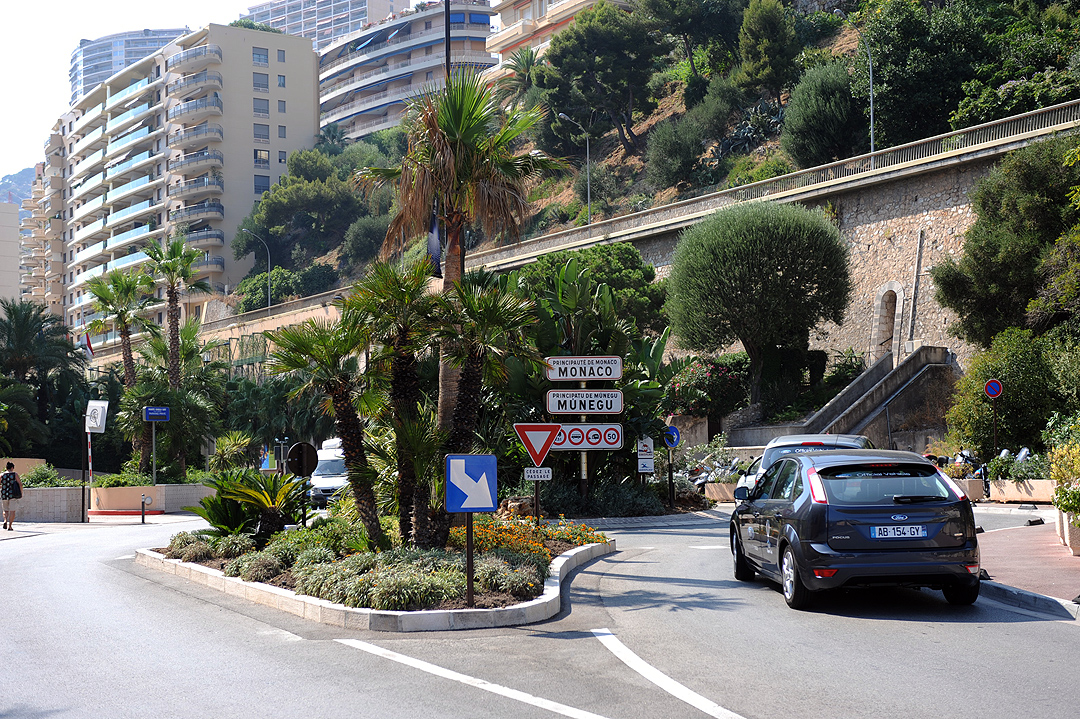
Open Schengen Area border crossing at the France-Monaco border (was open long before Schengen started)

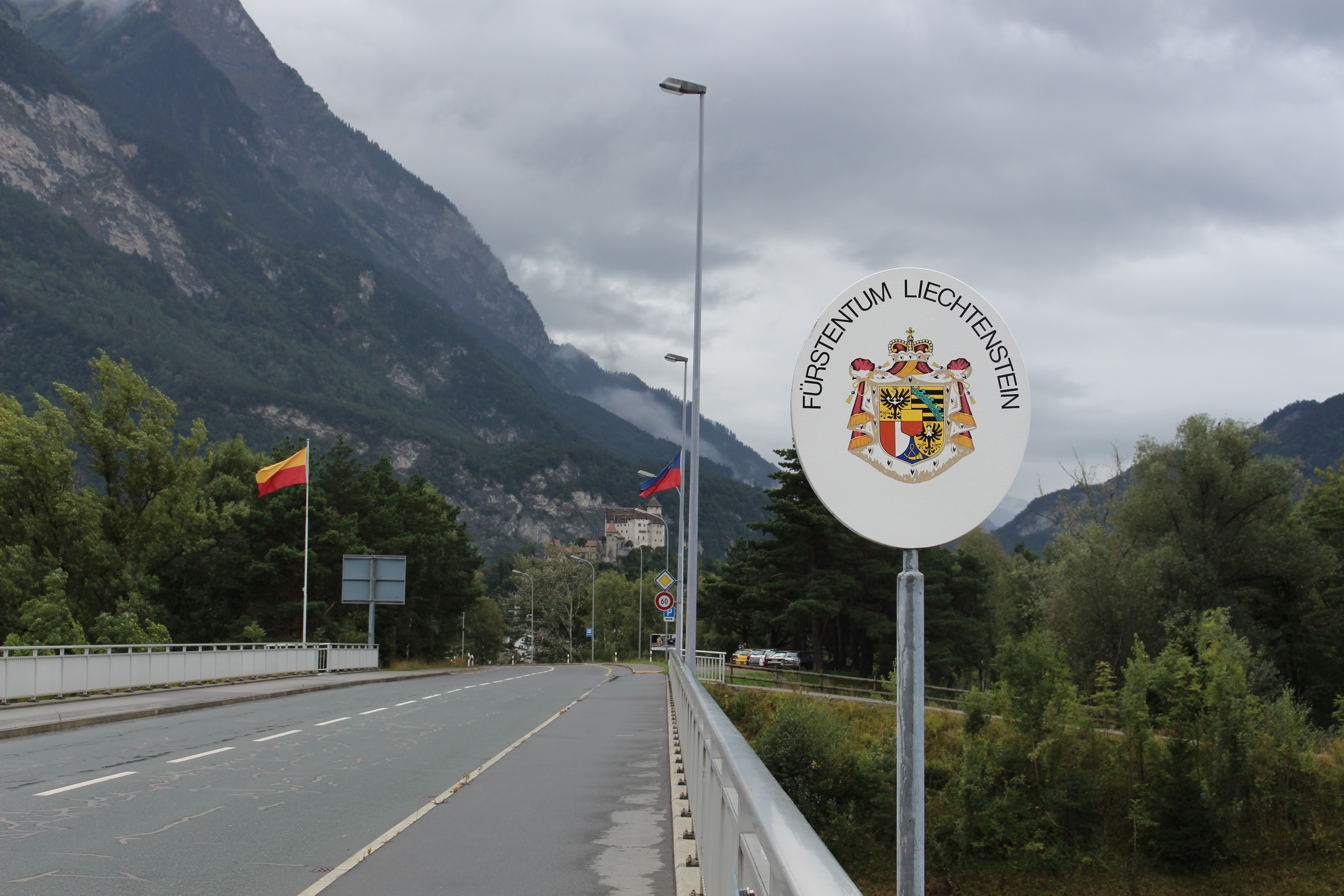
Open Schengen Area border crossing at the Swiss-Liechtenstein border (was open long before Schengen started)

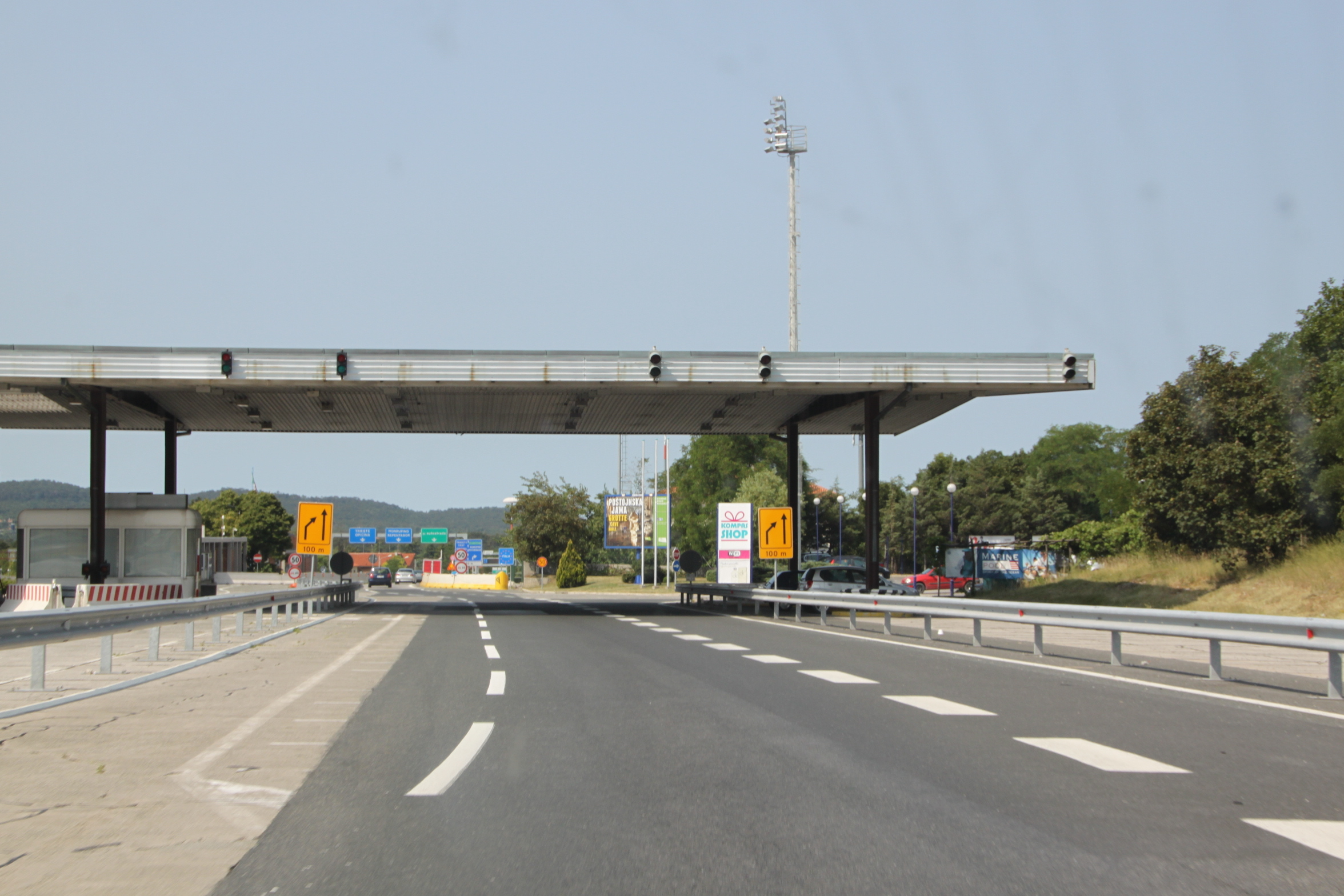
Open Schengen Area border crossing at the Slovenian-Italian border, with abandoned rain shelter

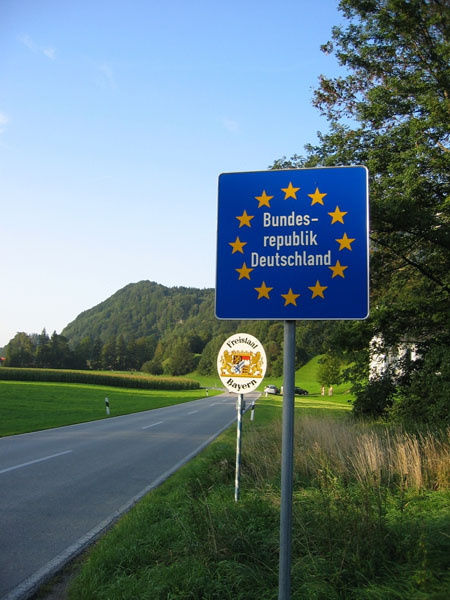
A Schengen internal border crossing marked only by a blue sign indicating the country being entered. The smaller white sign announces entry into the state of Bavaria.

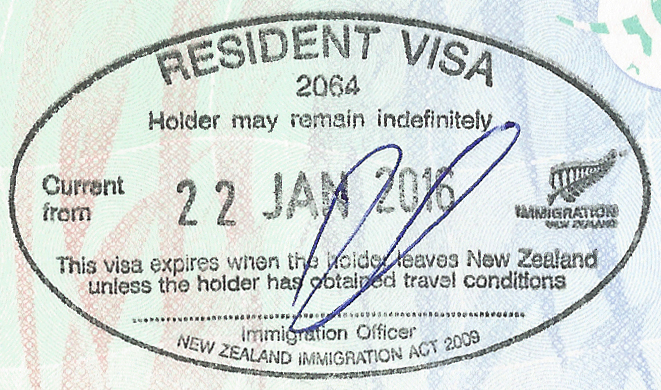
New Zealand visa stamp issued under Trans-Tasman Travel Arrangement on an Australian travel document

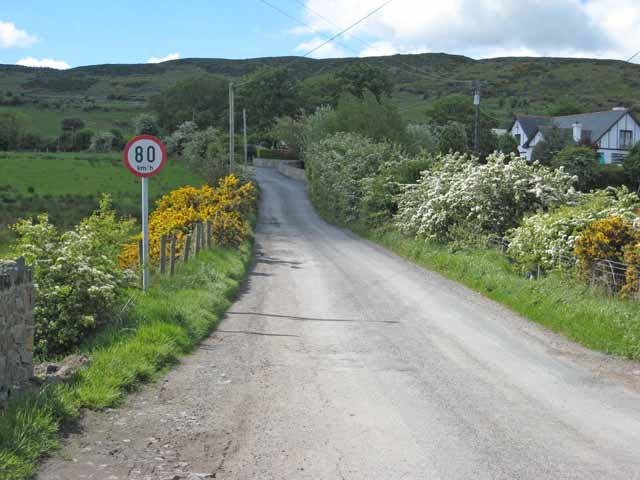
Irish border at Killeen (within CTA) marked only by a metric speed sign, as the Republic of Ireland uses the metric system whilst British road signs use imperial units

==== Hostile environment policies ====
Certain jurisdictions gear their immigration policies toward creating a hostile environment for undocumented migrants to deter migration by creating an unwelcoming atmosphere for potential and existing immigrants. Notably, the British Home Office adopted a set of administrative and legislative measures designed to make staying in the United Kingdom as difficult as possible for people without leave to remain, in the hope that they may "voluntarily leave". The Home Office policy was first announced in 2012 under the Conservative-Liberal Democrat coalition. The policy was implemented pursuant to the 2010 Conservative Party Election Manifesto. The policy has been criticized for being unclear, has led to many incorrect threats of deportation and has been called "Byzantine" by the England and Wales Court of Appeal for its complexity.

Similarly, anti-immigration movements in America have advocated for policies aimed at creating a hostile environment for intended and existing immigrants at various points in history. Historical examples include the nativist Know Nothing movement of the mid-19th century, which advocated hostile policies against Catholic immigrants; the Workingman's Party, which promoted xenophobic attitudes toward Asians in California during the late-19th century, a sentiment that ultimately led to the Chinese Exclusion Act of 1882; the Immigration Restriction League, which advocated xenophobic policies against southern and eastern Europe during the late-19th and early 20th centuries, and the joint congressional Dillingham Commission. After World War I, these cumulatively resulted in the highly restrictive Emergency Quota Act of 1921 and the Immigration Act of 1924. Over the first two decades of the 21st century, the Republican Party adopted an increasingly nativist platform, advocating against sanctuary cities and in favour of building a wall with Mexico and reducing the number of immigrants permitted to settle in the country. Ultimately, the Trump administration furthered many of these policy goals, including the adoption of harsh policies such as the Remain in Mexico and family separation policies vis-à-vis refugees and migrants arriving from Central America via Mexico. Islamophobic policies such as the travel ban targeted primarily at Muslim-majority countries also feature prominently in attempts to create a hostile environment for immigrants perceived by populists as not belonging to the predominant WASP culture in the United States.

India's citizenship registration policy serves to create a hostile environment for the country's Muslim community in the regions in which it has been implemented. The Indian government is presently in the process of building several detention camps throughout India in order to detain people not listed on the register. On 9 January 2019, the Union government released a '2019 Model Detention Manual', which said that every city or district, having a major immigration check post, must have a detention centre. The guidelines suggest detention centres with 3 metres (9 feet 10 inches) high boundary walls covered with barbed wires.

=== International zones ===
An international zone is any area not fully subject to the border control policies of the state in which it is located. There are several types of international zones, ranging from special economic zones and sterile zones at ports of entry exempt from customs rules to concessions over which administration is ceded to one or more foreign states. International zones may also maintain distinct visa policies from the rest of the surrounding state.

== Effects ==
The direct cost of border control is hundreds of billions to the United States government alone. Although the indirect economic costs of migration restrictions are much less well studied than those of trade barriers, some economists estimate that the indirect economic cost of border controls cost many trillions of dollars and the size of the global economy could double if migration restrictions were lifted. Immigration can in some cases reduce wages or worsen economic life-cycle assessments.

Global border controls have been associated with more than 63,000 border deaths since 2000, although scholars estimate that border deaths are significantly underestimated. Governments often blame unauthorized border crossers for taking excessive risks. Some unauthorized border crossers describe they choose dangerous methods of border crossing when safe and legal avenues are closed. In some cases, enforcement tactics have rerouted migrants to more dangerous routes with the stated goal to deter border crossers with the increased danger. Efforts to make unauthorized immigration more difficult may promote permanent settlement in place of earlier patterns of temporary migration.

== Internal border controls ==
Internal border controls are measures implemented to control the flow of people or goods within a given country. Such measures take a variety of forms, ranging from the imposition of border checkpoints to the issuance of internal travel documents, and vary depending on the circumstances in which they are implemented. Circumstances resulting in internal border controls include increasing security around border areas (e.g., internal checkpoints in America or Bhutan near border regions), preserving the autonomy of autonomous or minority areas (e.g., border controls between Peninsular Malaysia, Sabah, and Sarawak; border controls between Hong Kong, Macau, and mainland China), preventing unrest between ethnic groups (e.g., Northern Ireland's peace walls, border controls in Tibet and Northeastern India), and disputes between rival governments (e.g., between the Republic of China and the People's Republic of China).

During the COVID-19 pandemic, temporary internal border controls were introduced in jurisdictions across the globe. For instance, travel between Australian states and territories was prohibited or restricted by state governments at various points of the pandemic, either in conjunction with sporadic lockdowns or as a stand-alone response to COVID-19 outbreaks in neighbouring states. Internal border controls were also introduced at various stages of Malaysia's Movement Control Order, per which interstate travel was restricted depending on the severity of ongoing outbreaks. Similarly, internal controls were introduced by national authorities within the Schengen Area, though the European Union ultimately rejected the idea of suspending the Schengen Agreement per se.

=== Asia ===
Internal border controls exist in many parts of Asia. For example, travellers visiting minority regions in India and China often require special permits to enter. (Note: In India, special permits are required to travel across much of the country's north-east, and requirements may vary within a given state. Special provisions are occasionally made for individuals from Bhutan or Nepal proceeding to or from their home country. Additionally, individuals arriving in the Andaman and Nicobar Islands from elsewhere in India receive passport stamps (see gallery at the end of the section), even though only foreigners are typically subject to permit requirements. Permits issued for minority regions in India include: Restricted Area Permits and Protected Area Permits for foreigners in portions of north-eastern India and the Andaman and Nicobar Islands; Inner Line Permits for Indian citizens; In the Tibet Autonomous Region (Tibetan: བོད་རང་སྐྱོང་ལྗོངས།; Chinese: 西藏自治区), two categories of permits are issued: The Tibet Travel Permits (Chinese: 外国人入藏函 foreigners' entrance letter) required for all foreigners (as well as Taiwanese nationals from the Republic of China) to enter the region; The Alien Travel Permit is required for holders of the Tibet Travel Permit to travel outside major urban and tourist areas of the region; The Military Permit (or Border Permit) is required for travel to Ngari (Tibetan: མངའ་རིས་ས་ཁུལ་; Chinese: 阿里), Nyingchi (Tibetan: ཉིང་ཁྲི་ས།; Chinese: 林芝), and Nagqu (Tibetan: ནག་ཆུ།; Chinese: 那曲); Additionally, special permits are issued to nationals of India and Bhutan for religious pilgrimages to Hindu and Buddhist holy sites in the Tibet Autonomous Region.) Internal air and rail travel within non-autonomous portions of India and mainland China also generally require travel documents to be checked by government officials as a form of interior border checkpoint. For such travel within India, Indian citizens may utilise their Voter ID, National Identity Card, passport, or other proof of Indian citizenship, whilst Nepali nationals may present any similar proof of Nepali citizenship. For such travel within mainland China, Chinese nationals must use their national identity cards.

==== China ====
Within China, extensive border controls are maintained for those travelling between the mainland and the special administrative regions of Hong Kong and Macau. Foreign nationals need to present their passports or other required travel documents when travelling between these jurisdictions. For Chinese nationals (including those with British National (Overseas) status), there are special documents (Note: For example, Hong Kong Permanent Identity Card or Macau Identity Card and Home Return Permit (simplified Chinese: 回乡证; traditional Chinese: 回鄉證; pinyin: Huíxiāngzhèng) are required for Hong Kong or Macau Permanent Residents who are Chinese citizens to cross the border, whilst mainlanders require a Two-Way Permit (Chinese: 双程证).) for travel between these territories. Internal border controls in China have also led to the creation of special permits that allow Chinese citizens to immigrate to or reside in other immigration areas within the country. (Note: The following documents are currently issued for this purpose: For mainlanders emigrating to either of the two Special Administrative Regions, authorities in the mainland issue the One Way Travel Permit (Chinese: 单程证; pinyin: Dānchéngzhèng). As the policy is designed to curtail emigration from the mainland rather than immigration to either SAR, issuance is the responsibility of mainland authorities.; Since September 2018, authorities in the mainland have issued the Residence Permit for Hong Kong, Macao, and Taiwan Residents (Chinese: 港澳台居民居住证; pinyin: Gǎng-Aò-Tái Jūmín Jūzhùzhèng) authorising Chinese citizens from Hong Kong, Macau, and Taiwanese nationals to reside in the mainland. The permit is designed to resemble the national identity card issued to individuals with household registration on the mainland, and it enables holders to access public and private-sector services that require a national identity card number.)

China also maintains distinct, relaxed border control policies in the Special Economic Zones of Shenzhen, Zhuhai and Xiamen. Nationals of most countries (Note: Nationals of the following countries are ineligible for the SEZ visa: Afghanistan; Algeria; Bahrain; Cameroon; Egypt; Iran; Iraq; Jordan; Kuwait; Lebanon; Liberia; Libya; Morocco; Oman; Pakistan; Palestine; Saudi Arabia; Somalia; Sri Lanka; Sudan; Syria; Turkey; Uganda; Yemen) can obtain a limited area visa upon arrival in these regions, which permits them to stay within these cities without proceeding further into other parts of mainland China. Visas for Shenzhen are valid for 5 days, and those for Xiamen and Zhuhai are valid for 3 days. The duration of stay starts the day after arrival. The visa can only be obtained only upon arrival at Luohu Port, Huanggang Port Control Point, Fuyong Ferry Terminal or Shekou Passenger Terminal for Shenzhen; Gongbei Port of Entry, Hengqin Port or Jiuzhou Port for Zhuhai; and Xiamen Gaoqi International Airport for Xiamen.

Similarly, China permits nationals of non—visa-exempt ASEAN countries (Note: Non-visa-exempt ASEAN countries are: Cambodia; Indonesia; Laos; Malaysia; Myanmar; Philippines; Thailand; Vietnam) to visit Guilin without a visa for a maximum of 6 days if they travel with an approved tour group and enter China from Guilin Liangjiang International Airport. They may not visit other cities within Guangxi or other parts of mainland China.

Neither the People's Republic of China nor the Republic of China recognises the passports issued by the other, and neither considers travel between mainland China and areas controlled by the Republic of China as formal international travel. There are arrangements in place for travel between territories controlled by the Republic of China and territories controlled by the People's Republic of China. (Note: Documents required for travel between the PRC and ROC are: The Mainland Travel Permit for Taiwan Residents (simplified Chinese: 台胞证; traditional Chinese: 臺胞證; pinyin: Táibāozhèng) issued by the PRC for entry to the mainland, which is also valid but not mandatory for entry to Hong Kong and Macau; The Taiwan Entry Permit (Chinese: 入臺證; pinyin: Rùtáizhèngg) issued to mainlanders by the ROC; The Kinmen-Matsu Permit (traditional Chinese: 金馬證; simplified Chinese: 金马证; pinyin: JīnMǎ zhèng; Pe̍h-ōe-jī: Kim-Má-chèng) issued to residents of Kinmen and Matsu (ROC-administered territories in Fujian as well as Penghu for travel to and from the mainland.)

More generally, authorities in mainland China maintain a system of residency registration known as hukou (Chinese: 户口; lit. 'household individual'), by which government permission is needed to change one's place of residence formally. It is enforced using identity cards. This system of internal border control measures effectively limited internal migration before the 1980s, but subsequent market reforms caused it to collapse as a means of migration control. An estimated 150 to 200 million people are part of the "blind flow" and have unofficially migrated, generally from poor rural areas to wealthy urban areas. However, unofficial residents are often denied official services such as education and medical care and are sometimes subject to both social and political discrimination. In essence, the denial of social services outside an individual's registered area of residence serves as an internal border control measure aimed at dissuading migration within the mainland.

==== Bhutan ====
Meanwhile, in Bhutan, accessible by road only through India, there are interior border checkpoints (primarily on the Lateral Road) and, additionally, certain areas require special permits to enter, whilst visitors not proceeding beyond the border city of Phuentsholing do not need permits to enter for the day (although such visitors are de facto subject to Indian visa policy since they must proceed through Jaigaon). Individuals who are not citizens of India, Bangladesh, or the Maldives must obtain both their visa and any regional permits required through a licensed tour operator before arriving in the country. Citizens of India, Bangladesh, and the Maldives may apply online for regional permits to restricted areas.

==== Malaysia ====
Another example is the Malaysian states of Sabah and Sarawak, which have maintained their own border controls since joining Malaysia in 1963. The internal border control is asymmetrical: while Sabah and Sarawak impose immigration controls on Malaysian citizens from other states, there is no corresponding border control in Peninsular Malaysia, and Malaysians from Sabah and Sarawak have an unrestricted right to live and work in the Peninsular. For social and business visits of less than three months, Malaysian citizens may travel between the Peninsular, Sabah, and Sarawak using the Malaysian identity card (MyKad) or Malaysian passport, while for longer stays in Sabah and Sarawak, they are required to have an Internal Travel Document or a passport with the appropriate residential permit.

==== North Korea ====
The most restrictive internal border controls are in North Korea. Citizens are not allowed to travel outside their areas of residence without explicit authorisation, and access to the capital city, Pyongyang, is heavily restricted. Similar restrictions are imposed on tourists, who are only allowed to leave Pyongyang on government-authorised tours to approved tourist sites.

=== Europe ===
An example from Europe is the implementation of border controls on travel to and from Svalbard, which maintains a policy of free migration under the Svalbard Treaty and the Schengen Area, which includes the rest of Norway. Other examples of effective internal border controls in Europe include the closed cities of certain CIS members, areas of Turkmenistan that require special permits to enter, restrictions on travel to the Gorno-Badakhshan Autonomous Region in Tajikistan, and (depending on whether Northern and Southern Cyprus are considered separate countries) the Cypriot border. Similarly, Iraq's Kurdistan region maintains a separate, more liberal visa and customs regime from the rest of the country, even allowing visa-free entry for Israelis, whilst the rest of the country bans them from entering. Denmark also maintains a complex system of subnational countries which, unlike the Danish mainland, are outside the European Union and maintain autonomous customs policies. (Note: These are Greenland and the Faroe Islands. These areas do not maintain strict immigration controls with the Schengen Area, but border controls are sporadically enforced for customs purposes.) In addition to the numerous closed cities of Russia, parts of 19 subjects (Note: Chukotka Autonomous Okrug, all; In Leningrad Oblast – all Russian islands of Gulf of Finland, except Gogland, and a 20-km strip along the south coast of the Gulf of Finland.; The Republic of North Ossetia-Alania, 85% of territory. Transit to the borders with Georgia and South Ossetia is possible along the main roads. Tsey Gorge has been open for foreigners since 2012.; Part of Kaliningrad Oblast, approx. 15%.; Part of Moscow Oblast, approx. 10%.; Part of Arkhangelsk Oblast, include Novaya Zemlya, approx. 30%.; Part of Murmansk Oblast, approx. 15%. Transit to/from Norway is possible by the main road.; Part of Kamchatka Krai.; Part of Primorsky Krai.) of the Russian Federation are closed for foreigners without special permits and are consequently subject to internal border controls.

Another complex border-control situation in Europe involves the United Kingdom. Whilst the crown dependencies are within the Common Travel Area, neither Gibraltar nor the sovereign British military exclaves of Akrotiri and Dhekelia are. The former maintains its own border control policies, thus requiring physical border security at its border with the Schengen Area, as well as implementing border controls for travellers travelling directly between Gibraltar and the British mainland. The latter maintains a relatively open border with Southern Cyprus, though not with Northern Cyprus. Consequently, it is a de facto member of the Schengen Area, and travel to or from the British mainland is subject to border controls. On 31 December 2020, Spain and the United Kingdom reached an agreement in principle under which Gibraltar would join the Schengen Area, clearing the way for the European Union and the UK to start formal negotiations on the matter.

In the aftermath of Brexit, border controls for goods flowing between Great Britain and Northern Ireland were introduced in accordance with the Protocol on Ireland/Northern Ireland agreed to as part of the UK's withdrawal agreement with the EU. Due to the thirty-year internecine conflict in Northern Ireland, the UK-Ireland border has had a special status since that conflict was ended by the Belfast Agreement/Good Friday Agreement of 1998. As part of the Northern Ireland Peace Process, the border has been largely invisible, without any physical barrier or custom checks on its many crossing points; this arrangement was made possible by both countries' common membership of both the EU's Single Market and Customs Union and of their Common Travel Area. Upon the UK's withdrawal from the European Union, the border in Ireland became the only land border between the UK and the EU. EU single market and UK internal market provisions require certain customs checks and trade controls at their external borders. The Northern Ireland Protocol is intended to protect the EU single market, while avoiding imposition of a 'hard border' that might incite a recurrence of conflict and destabilize the relative peace that has held since the end of the Troubles. Under the Protocol, Northern Ireland is formally outside the EU single market, but EU free movement of goods rules and EU Customs Union rules still apply; this ensures there are no customs checks or controls between Northern Ireland and the rest of the island. In place of an Ireland/Northern Ireland land border, the protocol has created a de facto customs border down the Irish Sea for customs purposes, separating Northern Ireland from the island of Great Britain, to the disquiet of prominent Unionists. To operate the terms of the protocol, the United Kingdom must provide border control posts at Northern Ireland's ports: actual provision of these facilities is the responsibility of Northern Ireland's Department of Agriculture, Environment and Rural Affairs (DAERA). Temporary buildings were put in place for 1 January 2021, but in February 2021, the responsible Northern Ireland minister, Gordon Lyons (DUP), ordered officials to stop work on new permanent facilities and to stop recruiting staff for them. In its half yearly financial report on 26 August 2021, Irish Continental Group, which operates ferries between Great Britain and the Republic of Ireland, expressed concern at the lack of implementation of checks on goods arriving into Northern Ireland from Great Britain, as required under the protocol. The company said that the continued absence of these checks (on goods destined for the Republic of Ireland) is causing a distortion of the level playing field, since goods that arrive directly at the Republic of Ireland's ports from Great Britain are checked on arrival. The implementation of border controls between Great Britain and Northern Ireland was the primary catalyst for the 2021 Northern Ireland riots.

An unusual example of internal border controls pertains to customs enforcement within the Schengen area. Even though borders are generally invisible, the existence of areas within the Schengen area but outside the European Union Value Added Tax Area, as well as jurisdictions such as Andorra which are not officially a part of the Schengen area but can not be accessed without passing through it, has resulted in the existence of sporadic internal border controls for customs purposes. Additionally, as per Schengen area rules, hotels and other types of commercial accommodation must register all foreign citizens, including citizens of other Schengen states, by requiring the completion of a registration form by their own hand. (Note: This does not apply to accompanying spouses and minor children or members of travel groups. In addition, a valid identification document must be presented to the hotel manager or staff.) The Schengen rules do not require any other procedures; thus, the Schengen states are free to regulate further details on the content of the registration forms, and identity documents which are to be produced, and may also require the persons exempted from registration by Schengen laws to be registered. A Schengen state is also permitted to reinstate border controls with another Schengen country for a short period where there is a serious threat to that state's "public policy or internal security" or when the "control of an external border is no longer ensured due to exceptional circumstances". When such risks arise out of foreseeable events, the state in question must notify the European Commission in advance and consult with other Schengen states. Since the implementation of the Schengen Agreement, this provision has been invoked frequently by member states, especially in response to the European migrant crisis. (Note: For example, in April 2010, Malta introduced temporary checks due to Pope Benedict XVI's visit. It reimposed checks in 2015 in the weeks surrounding the Commonwealth Heads of Government Meeting. In response to the European migrant crisis, several countries set up internal controls. In 2019, Denmark, worried about the bombings in Sweden, introduced passport controls to Swedish citizens for the first time since the 1950s.)

=== Middle East ===
The Israeli military maintains an intricate network of internal border controls within the Israeli-occupied West Bank as well as external border controls between the West Bank and Israel, restricting the freedom of movement of Palestinians, composed of permanent, temporary, and random manned checkpoints in the West Bank; the West Bank Barrier; and restrictions on the usage of roads by Palestinians. Spread throughout the areas of the State of Palestine under de facto Israeli control, internal border control measures are a key feature of Palestinian life and are among the most restrictive in the world. Additionally, the blockade of the Gaza Strip results in a de facto domestic customs and immigration border for Palestinians. To clear internal border controls, Palestinians are required to obtain a variety of permits from Israeli authorities, depending on the purpose and area of their travel. The legality and impact of this network of internal border controls are controversial. B'Tselem, an Israeli non-governmental organisation that monitors human rights in Palestine, argues that they breach the rights guaranteed by the International Covenant on Economic, Social and Cultural Rights—in particular, the right to a livelihood, the right to an acceptable standard of living, the right to satisfactory nutrition, clothing, and housing, and the right to attain the best standard of physical and mental health. B'Tselem also argues that the restrictions on ill, wounded and pregnant Palestinians seeking acute medical care is in contravention of international law that states that medical professionals and the sick must be granted open passage. While Israeli Supreme Court has deemed the measures acceptable for security reasons, Haaretz's Amira Hass argues this policy defies one of the principles of the Oslo Accords, which states that Gaza and the West Bank constitute a single geographic unit.

Strained intercommunal relations in Northern Ireland between Irish Catholics and the descendants of Protestant settlers from England and Scotland have resulted in de facto internal checkpoints. The peace lines are an internal border security measure to separate predominantly republican and nationalist Catholic neighbourhoods from predominantly loyalist and unionist Protestant neighbourhoods. They have been in place in some form or another since the end of The Troubles in 1998, with the Good Friday Agreement. The majority of peace walls are located in Belfast, but they also exist in Derry, Portadown, and Lurgan, with more than 32 kilometres (20 miles) of walls in Northern Ireland. The peace lines range in length from a few hundred metres to over 5 kilometres. They may be made of iron, brick, steel, or a combination of the three and are up to 8 metres (26 feet) high. Some have gates in them (sometimes staffed by police) that allow passage during daylight but are closed at night.

=== North America ===
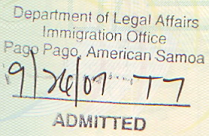
American Samoa entry stamp

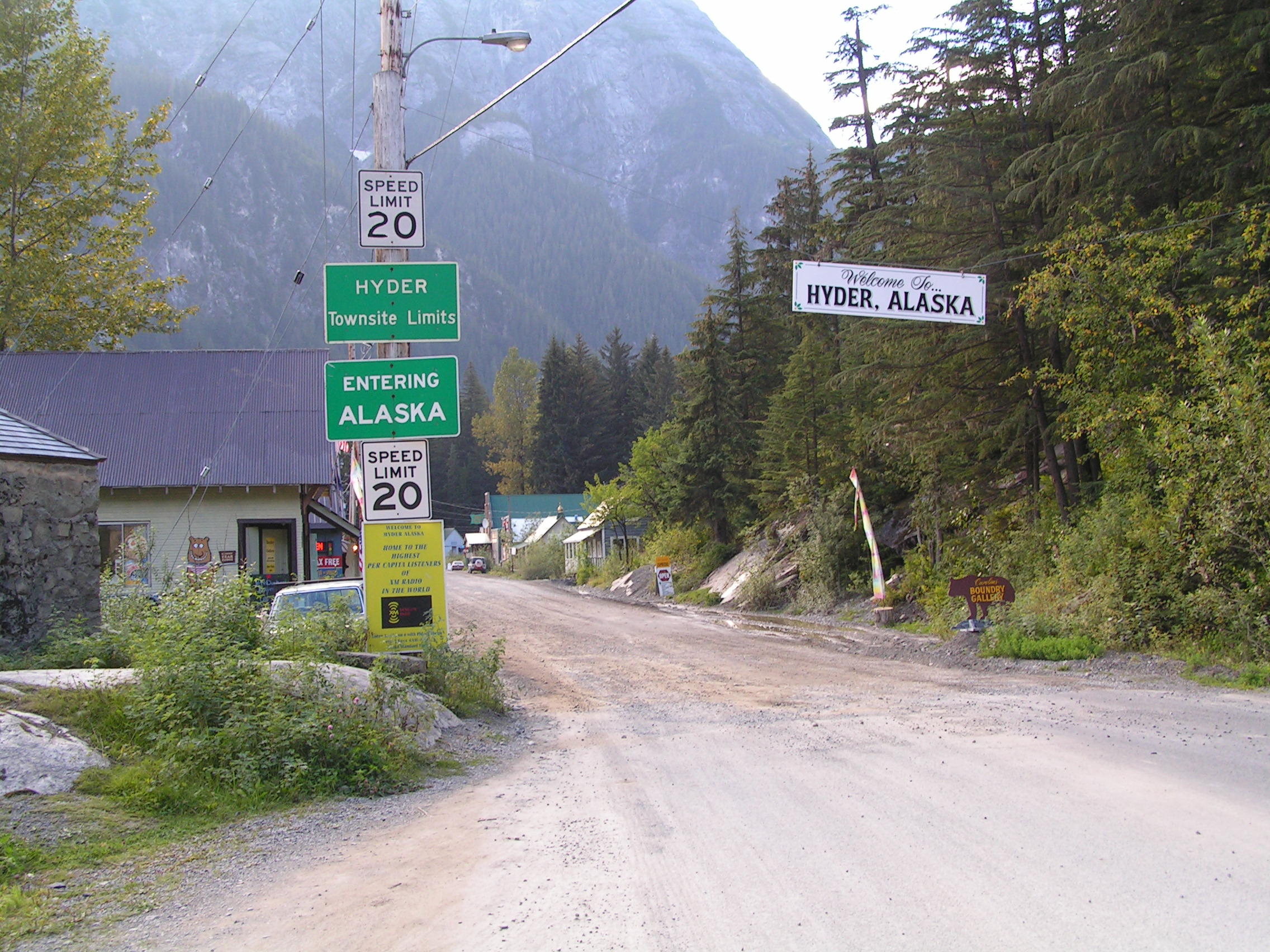
Hyder, Alaska, has no border controls for travellers entering from Canada, and travellers flying between Hyder and other Alaskan cities by seaplane undergo internal border control.

Multiple types of internal border controls exist in the United States. While the American territories of Guam and the Northern Mariana Islands follow the same visa policy as the mainland, together, they also maintain their own visa waiver programme for certain nationalities. Since the two territories are outside the customs territory of the United States, there are customs inspections when travelling between them. The rest of the U.S. American Samoa has its own customs and immigration regulations, thus travelling between it and other American jurisdictions involves both customs and immigration inspections. The Virgin Islands are a special case: they fall within the American immigration zone and follow American visa policy, but are a customs-free territory. As a result, there are no immigration checks between the two, but travellers arriving in Puerto Rico or the American mainland directly from the Virgin Islands are subject to border control for customs inspection. The United States also maintains interior checkpoints, similar to those maintained by Bhutan, along its borders with Mexico and Canada, subjecting people to border controls even after they have entered the country.

The Akwesasne nation; with territory in Ontario, Quebec, and New York; features several de facto internal border controls. As a result of protests by Akwesasne residents on their rights to cross the border unimpeded, as provided under the 1795 Jay Treaty, the Canada Border Services Agency closed its post on Cornwall Island, instead requiring travellers to proceed to the checkpoint in the city of Cornwall. As a consequence of the arrangement, residents of the island are required to clear border controls when proceeding North to the Ontario mainland, as well as when proceeding South to Akwesasne territory in New York, thereby constituting internal controls from both a Canadian and an Akwesasne perspective. Similarly, travelling between Canada and the Quebec portion of the Akwesasne nation requires driving through the state of New York, meaning individuals must clear American controls when leaving Quebec proper and Canadian border controls when entering Quebec proper. However, Canada does not impose border controls when entering the Quebec portion of the Akwesasne Nation. Nevertheless, for residents who assert a Haudenosaunee national identity distinct from Canadian or American citizenship, the intricate network of Canadian and American border controls is seen as a foreign-imposed system of internal border controls, similar to the Israeli checkpoints in Palestinian territory.

The city of Hyder, Alaska, has also been subject to internal border controls since America chose to stop regulating arrivals in Hyder from British Columbia. Since travellers exiting Hyder into Stewart, British Columbia, are subject to Canadian border controls, it is theoretically possible for someone to accidentally enter Hyder from Canada without their travel documents and then face difficulties, as both the U.S. and Canada would subject them to border controls that require travel documents. At the same time, however, the northern road connecting Hyder to the uninhabited mountain regions of British Columbia has neither American nor Canadian border controls, meaning that tourists from Canada proceeding northwards from Hyder are required to complete Canadian immigration formalities when they return to Stewart, despite never having cleared American immigration.

=== Historical ===
Identification and freedom of internal movement have sometimes been instruments of oppression, for example, in Canada's pass system, or Apartheid-era South Africa's Pass laws.

== Specific requirements ==
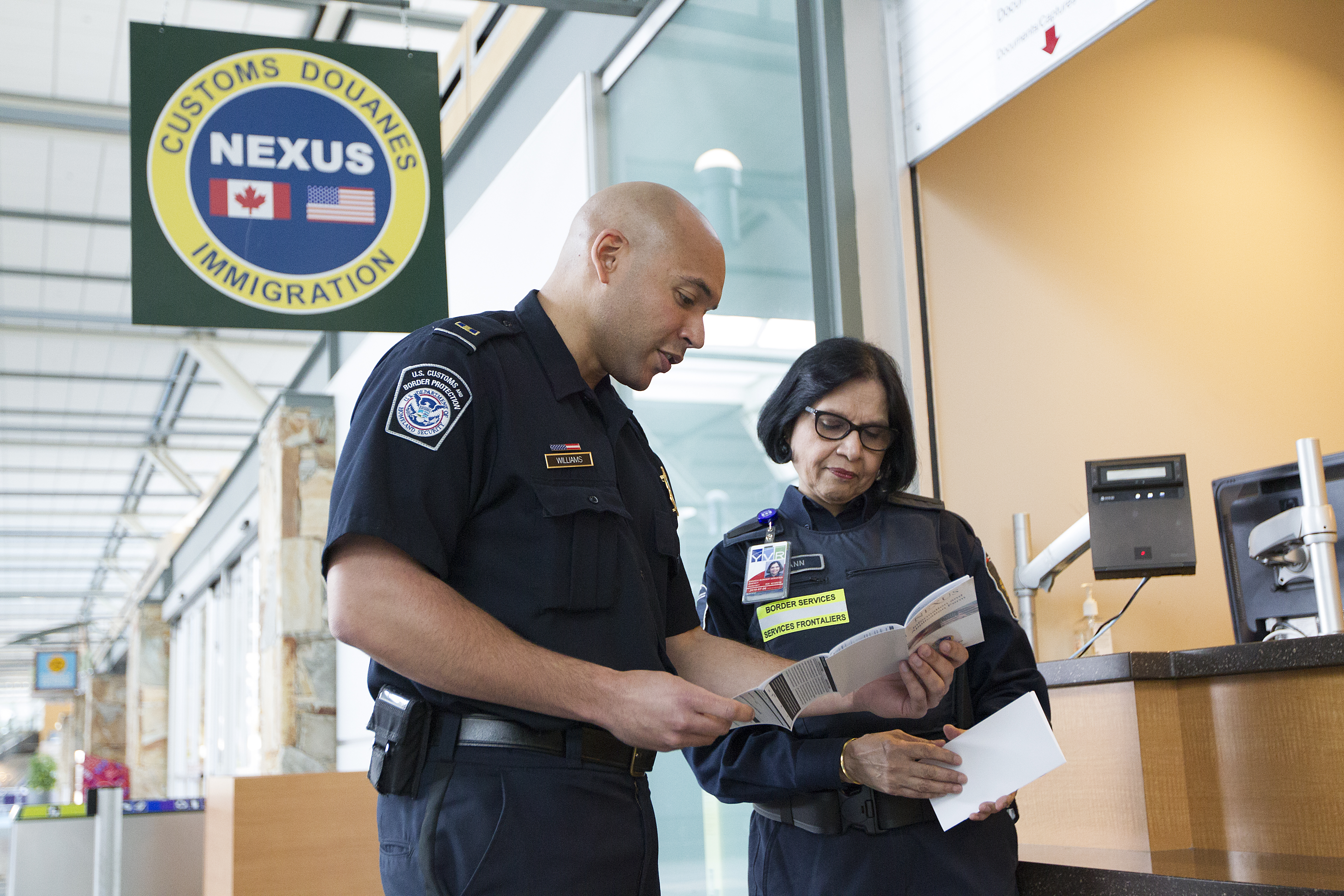
American and Canadian border officers at the Vancouver airport

The degree of strictness of border controls varies across countries and borders. In some countries, controls may be targeted at the traveller's religion, ethnicity, nationality, or countries visited. Others may need to ensure the traveller has paid the appropriate fees for their visas and has future travel planned outside the country. Yet others may concentrate on the contents of the traveller's baggage and imported goods to ensure nothing is being carried that might pose a biosecurity risk to the country.

=== Biometrics ===
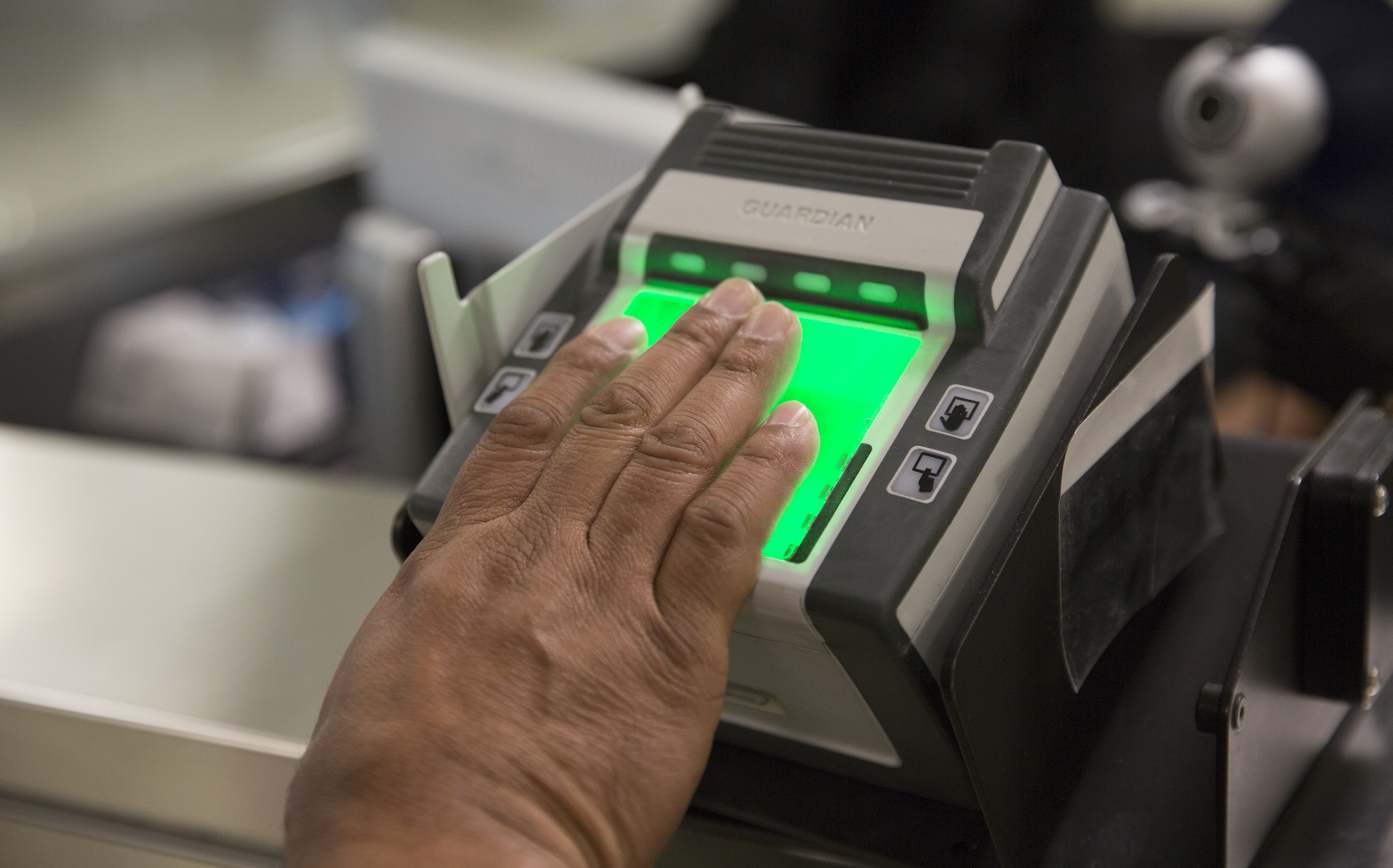
A fingerprint scanner at Dulles International Airport collects biometric data on visitors, which can be used for confirming identities.

Several countries (Note: Countries collecting fingerprints at checkpoints include America, Argentina, Brunei, Cambodia, China, Ethiopia, Ghana, Guinea, India, Japan, Kenya (both fingerprints and a photo are taken), Malaysia upon entry and departure, Paraguay, Saudi Arabia, Singapore, South Korea, Taiwan, Thailand, and Uganda.) require all travellers, or all foreign travelers, to be fingerprinted on arrival and refuse admission to or arrest travellers who refuse to comply. In some countries, such as America, this may apply even to transit passengers proceeding to a third country. Many countries also require a photo to be taken of people entering the country. The United States, which does not fully implement exit control formalities at its land frontiers (although long mandated by domestic legislation), intends to implement facial recognition for passengers departing from international airports to identify people who overstay their visa. Together with fingerprint and face recognition, iris scanning is one of three biometric identification technologies internationally standardised since 2006 by the International Civil Aviation Organization (ICAO) for use in e-passports and the United Arab Emirates conducts iris scanning on visitors who need to apply for a visa. The Department of Homeland Security has announced plans to increase the biometric data it collects at American borders greatly. In 2018, Singapore began trials of iris scanning at three land and maritime immigration checkpoints.

=== Immigration stamps ===
An immigration stamp is an inked impression in a passport or other travel document, typically made by a rubber stamp upon entering or exiting a territory. Depending on the jurisdiction, a stamp can serve different purposes. For example, in the United Kingdom, an immigration stamp in a passport includes the formal leave to enter granted to a person subject to entry control. In other countries, a stamp activates or acknowledges the continuing leave conferred in the passport bearer's entry clearance. Under the Schengen system, a foreign passport is stamped with a date stamp which does not indicate any duration of stay. This means the person is deemed to have permission to remain for either 3 months or the period shown on their visa, if specified otherwise. Member states of the European Union are not permitted to place a stamp in the passport of a person who is not subject to immigration control. Stamping is prohibited because it imposes a control to which the person is not subject. Passport stamps may occasionally take the form of sticker stamps, such as entry stamps from Japan. Depending on nationality, a visitor may not receive a stamp at all (unless specifically requested), such as an EU or EFTA citizen travelling to an EU or EFTA country, Albania, or North Macedonia. Most countries issue exit stamps in addition to entry stamps. A few countries issue only entry stamps, including Canada, El Salvador, Ireland, Mexico, New Zealand, Singapore, United Kingdom and the United States of America. Australia, Hong Kong, Israel, Macau and South Korea do not stamp passports upon entry nor exit. These countries or regions issue landing slips instead, except for Australia, which does not issue any physical evidence of entry. Visas may also take the form of passport stamps.

Immigration authorities usually use different stamp styles for entries and exits to make it easier to track people's movements. Ink colour might be used to designate the mode of transportation (air, land, or sea), as in Hong Kong before 1997, while border styles did the same in Macau. Other variations include changing the stamp size to indicate the length of stay, as in Singapore.

In many cases, passengers on cruise ships do not receive passport stamps because the entire vessel has been cleared into port. It is often possible to get a souvenir stamp, although this requires finding the immigration office by the dock. In many cases, officials are used to such requests and will cooperate. Also, as noted below, some of the smallest European countries will give a stamp on request, either at their border or tourist office charging, at most, a nominal fee.

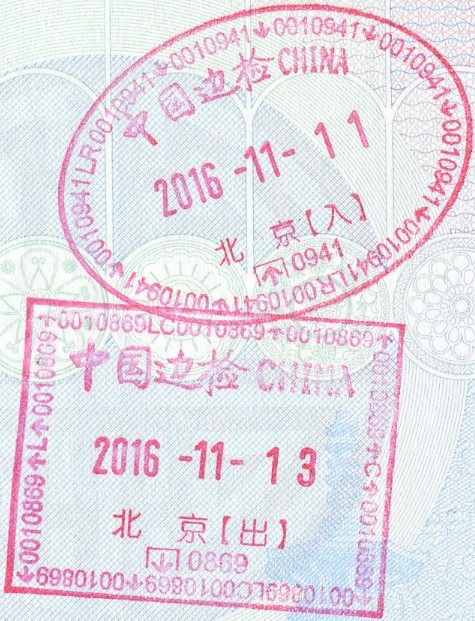
Entry and exit stamps issued at Beijing Capital International Airport in a Republic of Korea passport

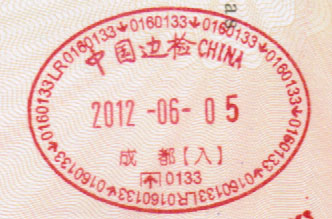
Entry stamp issued at Chengdu Shuangliu International Airport in a Chinese passport

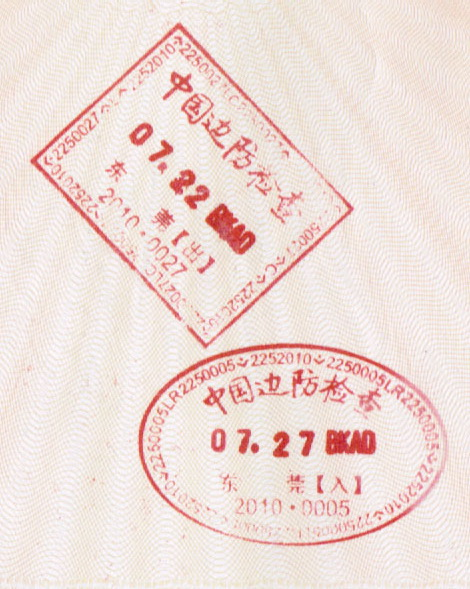
Old entry and exit stamps issued at Dongguan in a Chinese passport
(noted that there were no English on stamps)

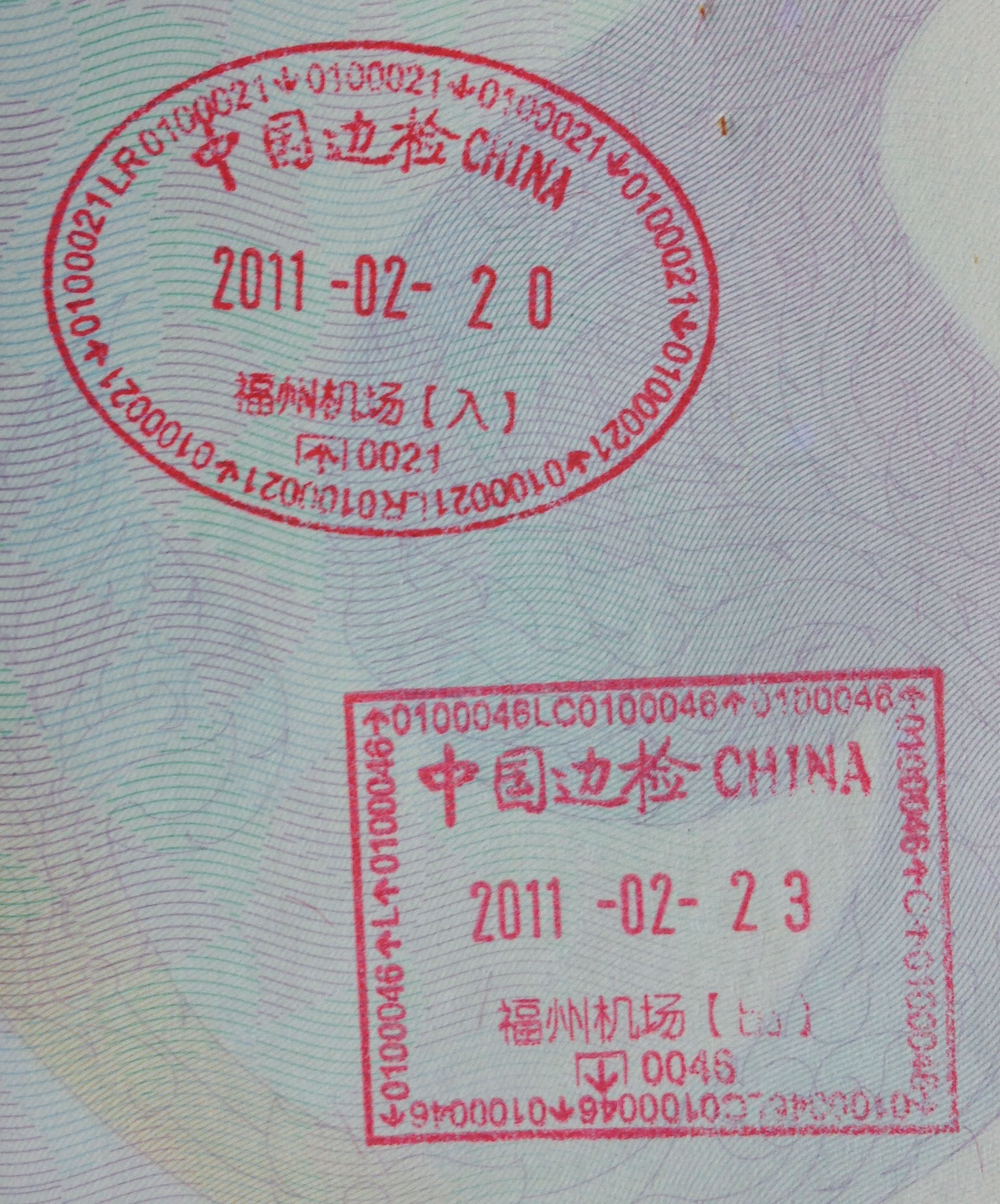
Entry and exit stamps issued at Fuzhou Changle International Airport in a Thai passport

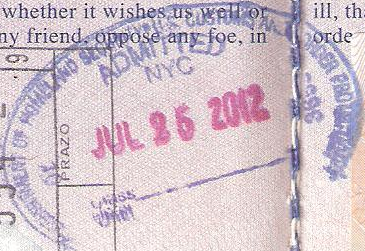
American stamp from John F. Kennedy International Airport in a U.S. Passport

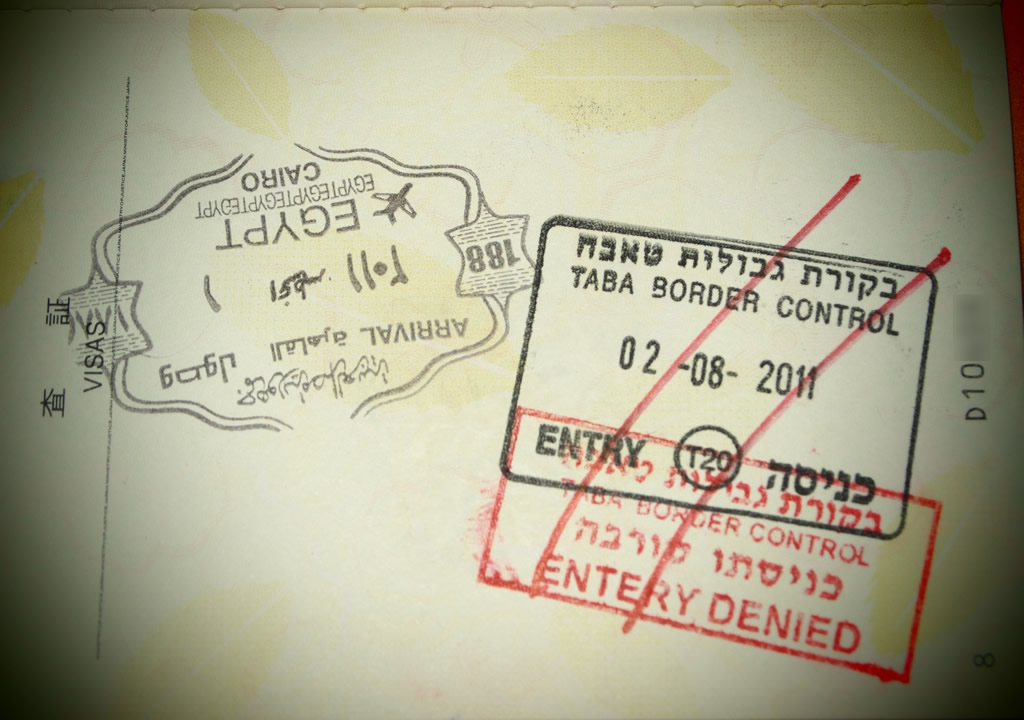
An "entry denied" stamp from the Israeli Taba Border Crossing (Some jurisdictions – such as Germany and Israel – have historically stamped "Entry Denied" on passports.)

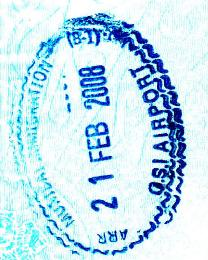
Entry stamp issued at Chhatrapati Shivaji International Airport in an Indian passport

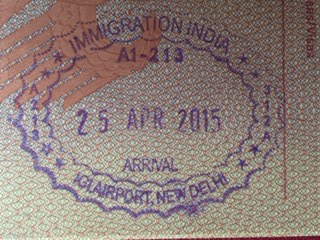
Entry stamp issued at Indira Gandhi International Airport to a citizen of Germany

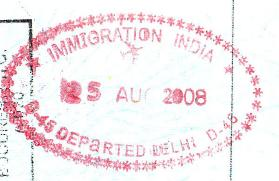
Exit stamp in an Indian passport issued at Indira Gandhi International Airport

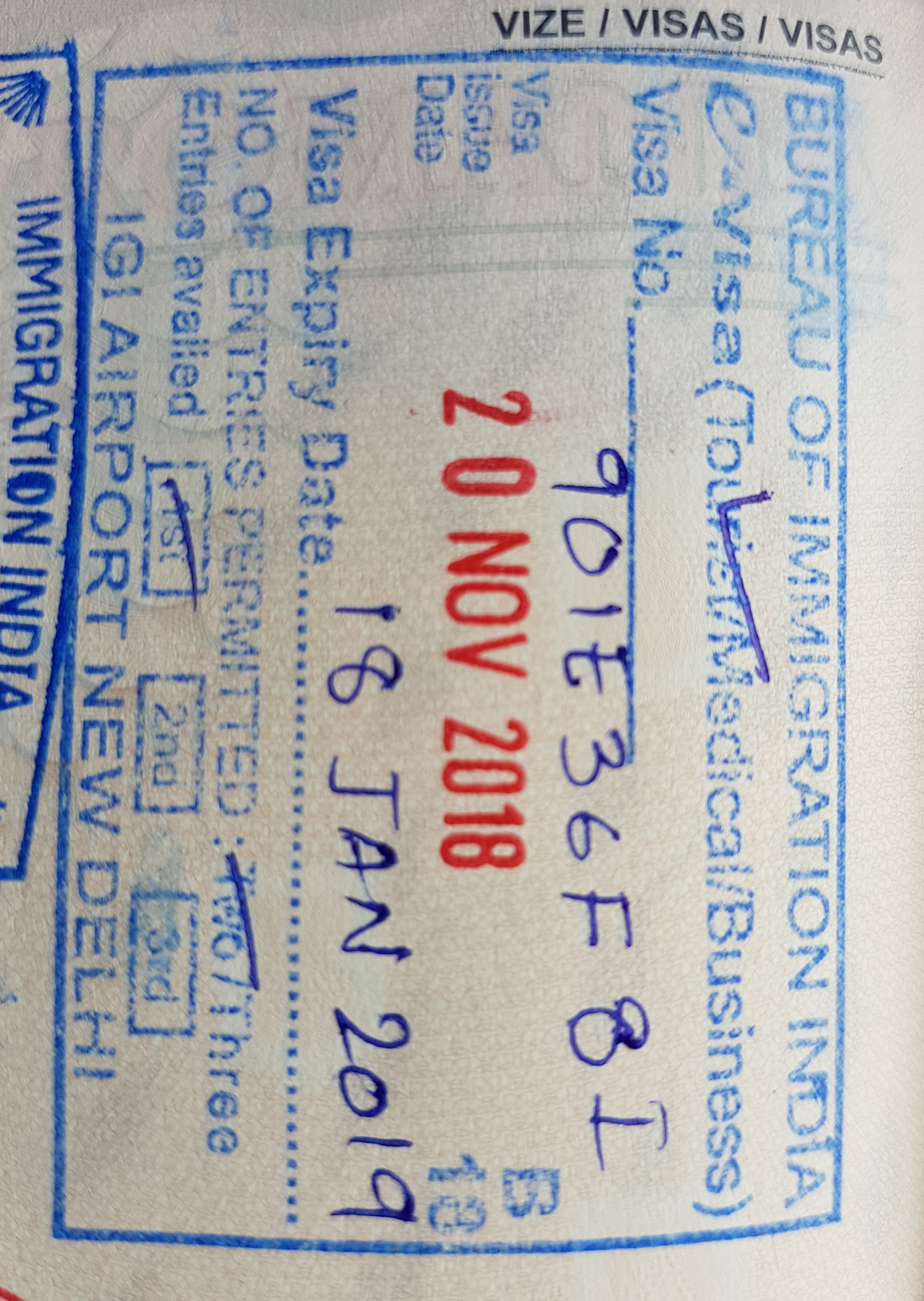
An Indian e-Visa issued at Indira Gandhi International Airport in a Romanian passport

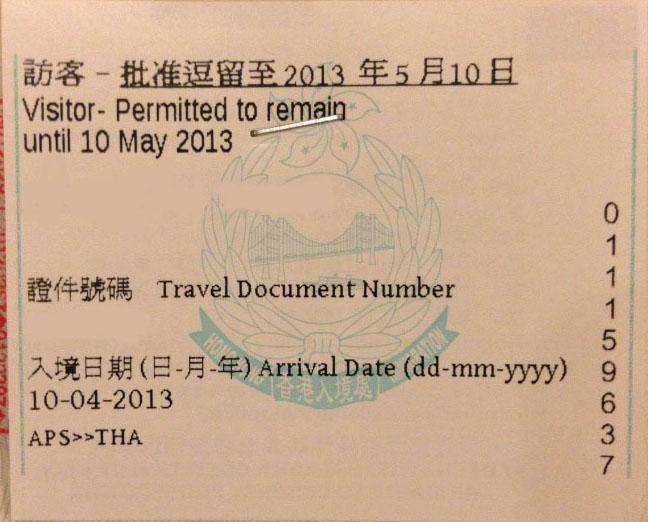
Landing slip replacing existing passport stamps (Being unable to present the landing slip on departure does not affect a traveller's ability to clear immigration.)

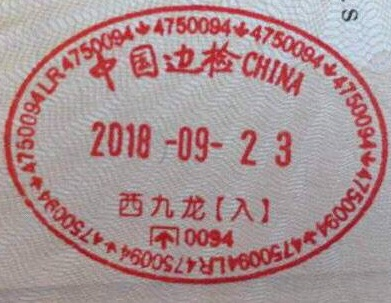
Entry stamp issued at juxtaposed controls at Hong Kong West Kowloon railway station

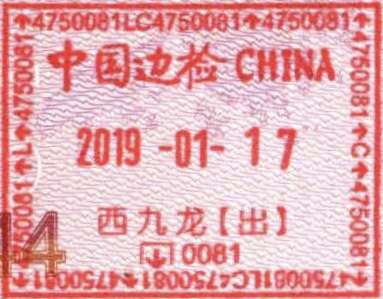
Exit stamp issued at juxtaposed controls at Hong Kong West Kowloon railway station in a Chinese passport

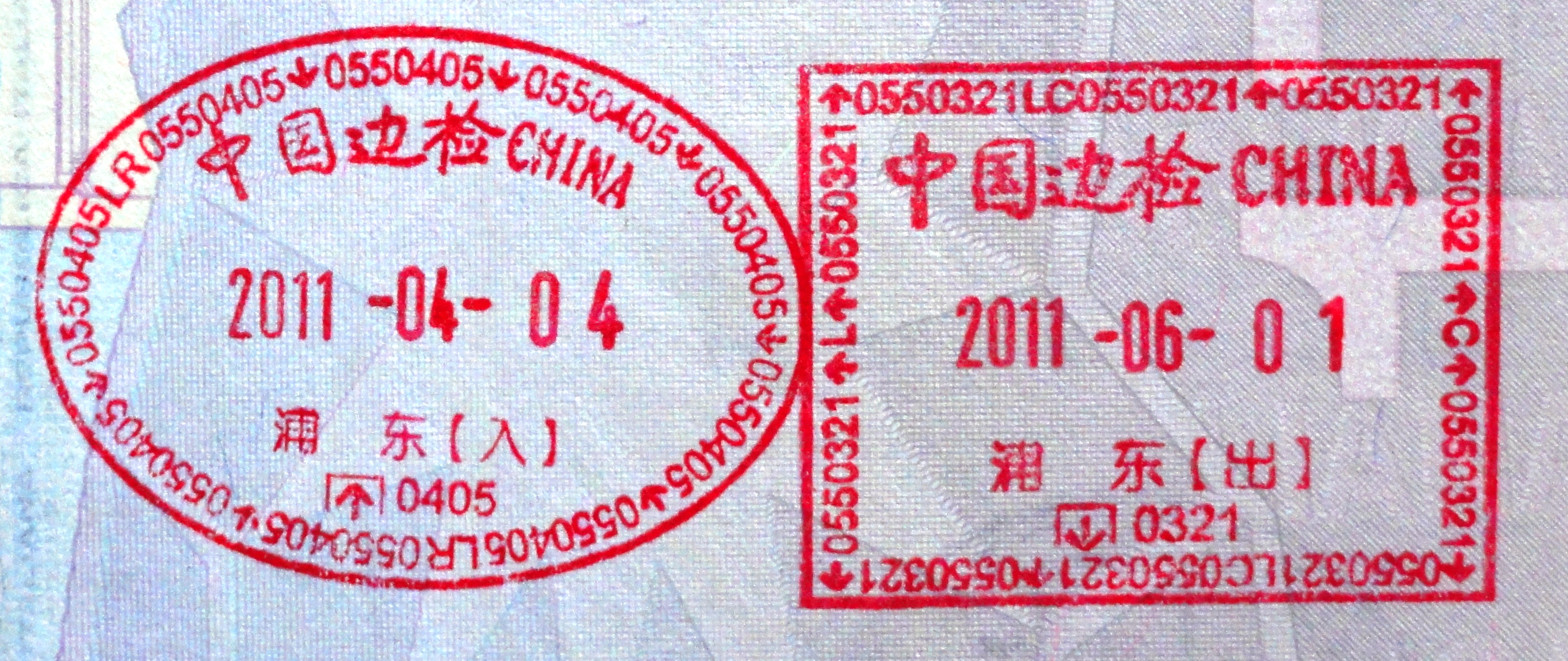
Entry and exit stamps issued at Shanghai Pudong International Airport in an Italian passport

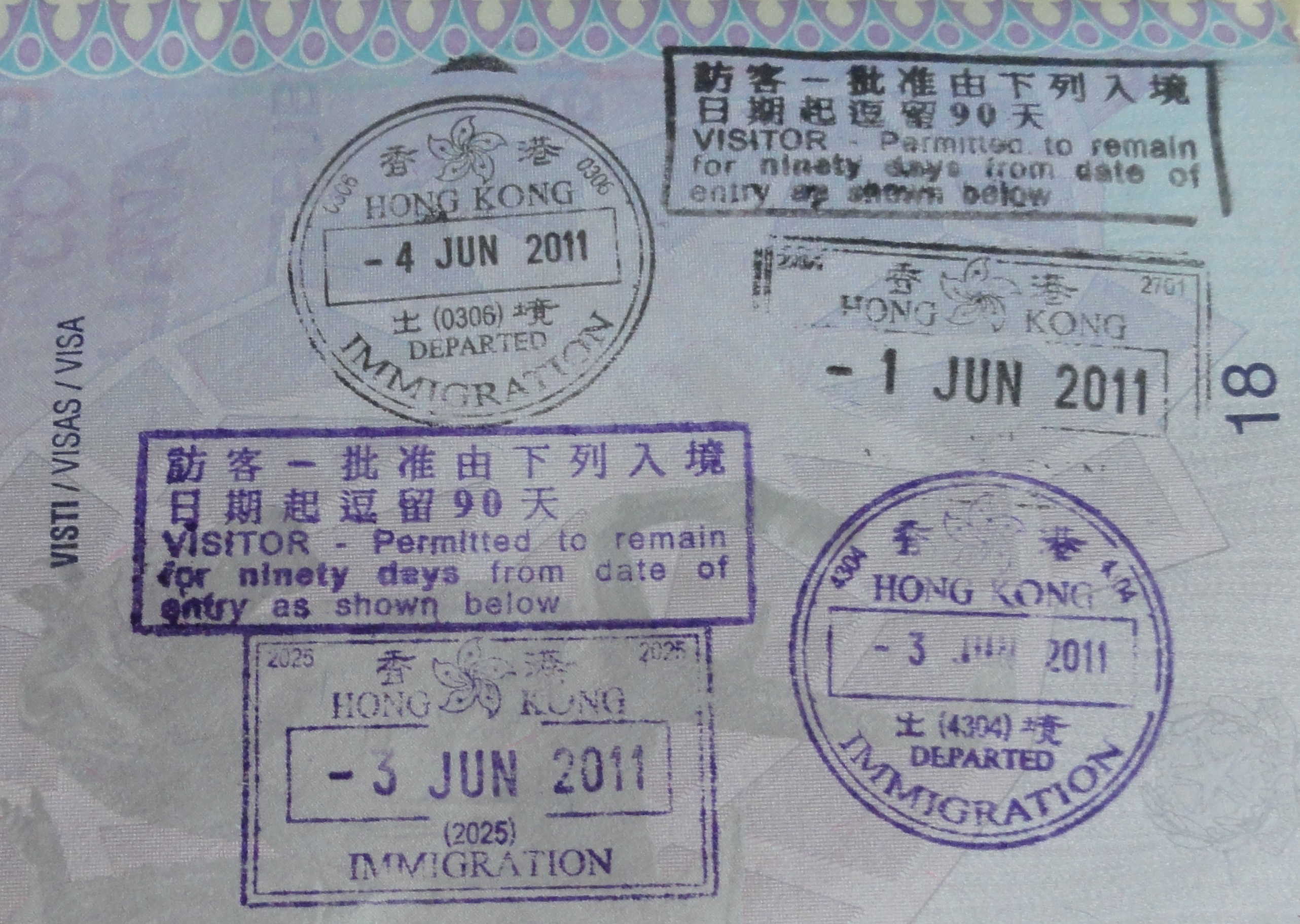
Entry and exit stamps issued at Hong Kong International Airport and the Hong Kong–Macau Ferry Terminal in an Italian passport

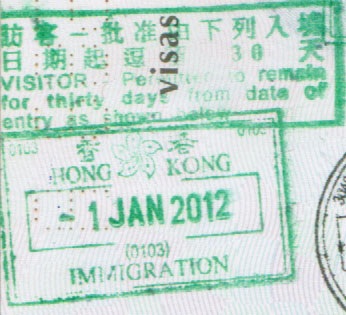
Entry stamp issued at Hong Kong China Ferry Terminal in a Thai passport

=== Exit controls ===
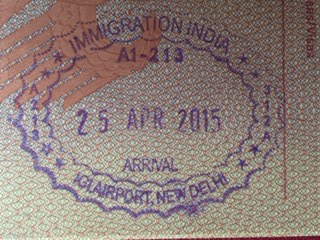
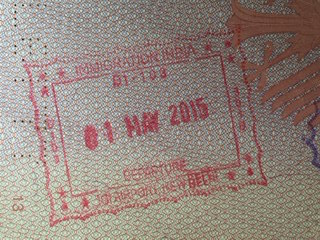
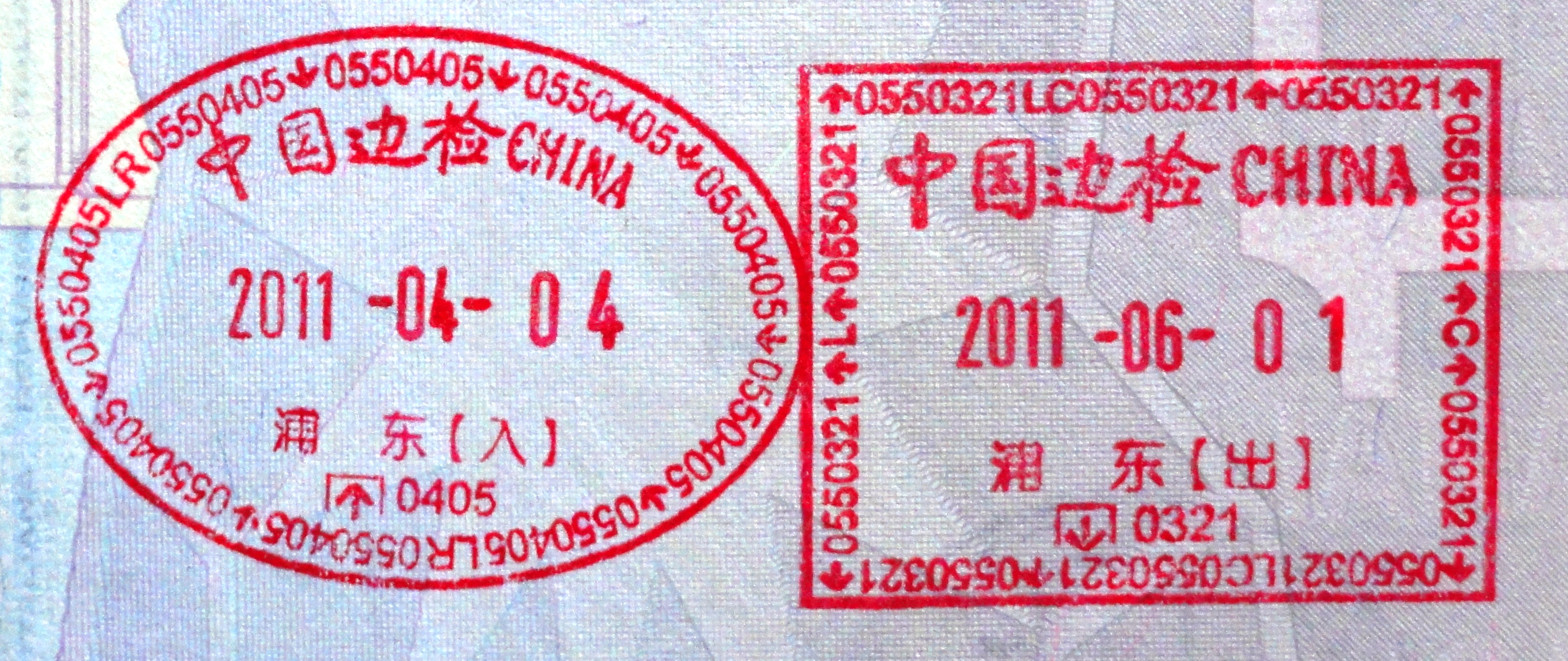
India and China, like most countries, implement border controls at both entry and exit, and consequently stamp passports upon exit.

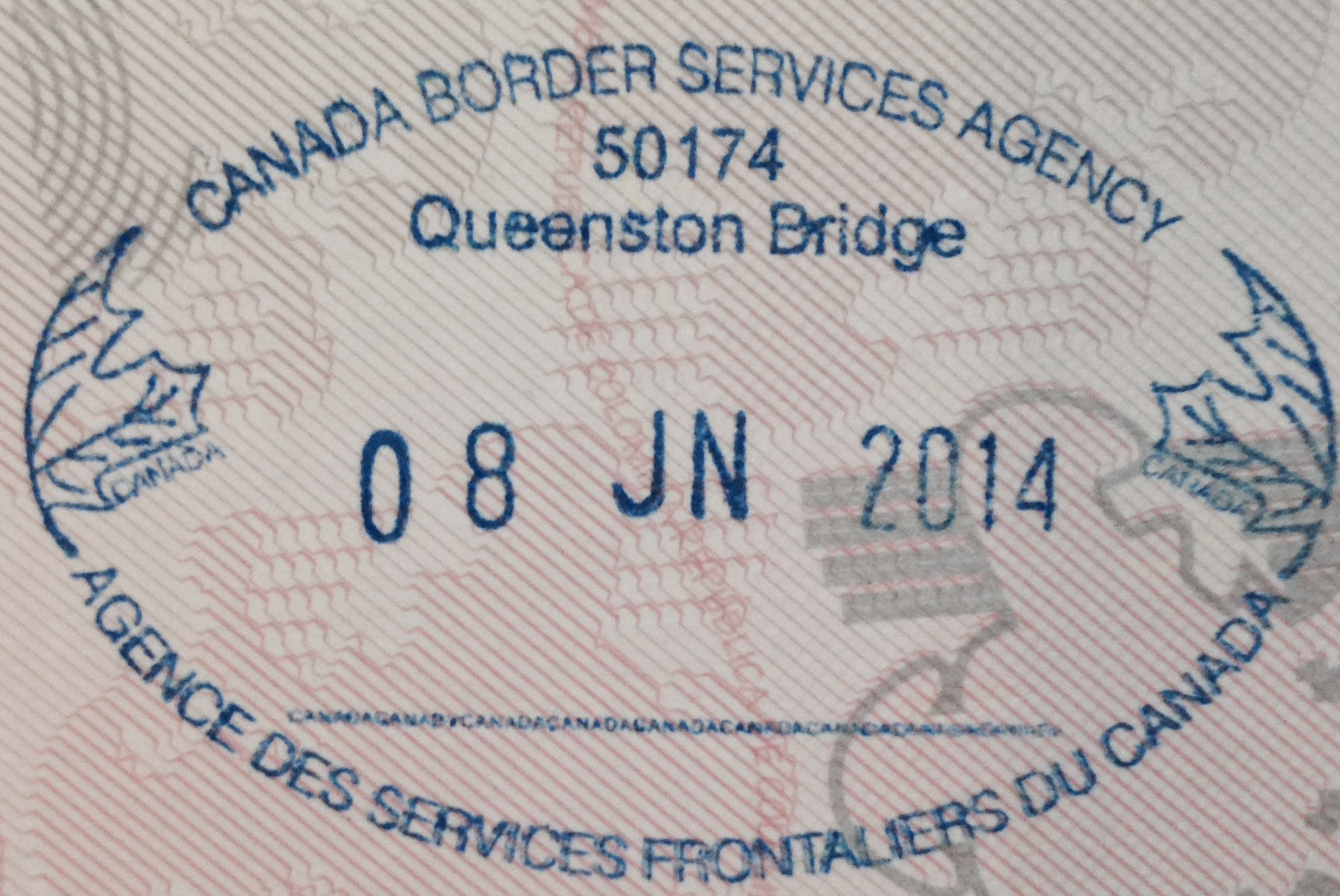
Entry stamp at Lewiston–Queenston Bridge, Ontario. Canada only conducts border control and stamps passports upon entry.

Whilst most countries implement border controls both at entry and exit, some jurisdictions do not. For instance, the United States and Canada do not implement exit controls at land borders and collect exit data on foreign nationals through airlines and by sharing information with neighbouring countries' entry border controls. These countries consequently do not issue exit stamps, even to travellers who require entry stamps. Similarly, Australia, Singapore, and South Korea have eliminated exit stamps even though they continue to implement brief border control checks upon exit for most foreign nationals. In countries where there is no formal control by immigration officials over travel documents at departure, exit information may be recorded by immigration authorities using information provided by transport operators.

No exit control:

- United States of America
- Canada
- Mexico (by air, but entrance declaration coupon is collected)
- (The Bahamas) Bahamas
- (Republic of Ireland) Ireland
- United Kingdom (Note: Border Force officers do not carry out systematic checks of travel documents on passengers travelling to a destination outside the Common Travel Area by air, rail or sea (though from time to time spot checks are carried out – in this case passports are not stamped); instead, airline/rail/ferry companies obtain passengers' travel document information at check-in or on departure and transmit the information electronically to the UK Border Force)

Formal exit control without passport stamping:

- Albania (Entry & Exit stamp may be issued upon request)
- Australia (Exit stamp issued upon explicit request)
- China (Exit stamp issued upon request when using e-Gate)
- Costa Rica (only at Costa Rican airports; different entry and exit stamps are made at the border crossing with Panama)
- El Salvador
- Fiji
- Hong Kong (no entry or exit stamps are issued; instead, landing slips are issued upon arrival only)
- Iran
- Israel (no entry or exit stamps are issued at Ben Gurion Airport, instead landing slips are issued upon arrival and departure)
- Japan (Exit stamp issued upon request & when not using e-Gate since July 2019)
- Macau (no entry or exit stamps are issued; instead, landing slips are issued upon arrival only)
- New Zealand
- South Korea (since 1 November 2016)
- Panama (only at Panamanian airports; stamps are made at the border crossing with Costa Rica)
- (Taiwan) Republic of China (exit stamp issued upon request & when not using e-Gate)
- Singapore (no exit stamps since 22 April 2019)
- Saint Kitts and Nevis
- (Europe) Schengen Area countries (when the Entry/Exit System becomes operational, it is anticipated that the passports of third-country nationals will not be stamped when they enter and leave the Schengen Area)

=== Exit permits ===
Some countries maintain controversial exit visa systems in addition to regular border controls. For instance, Uzbekistan requires its citizens to obtain exit visas before leaving for countries outside the CIS, including Eastern European nations. Several countries in the Arabian peninsula require exit visas for foreign workers under the Kafala System, meaning "sponsorship system"). Russia occasionally requires foreigners who overstay to obtain exit visas since one cannot exit Russia without a valid visa. Czechia has a similar policy. Similarly, a foreign citizen granted a temporary residence permit in Russia needs an exit visa to take a trip abroad (valid for both exit and return). Not all foreign citizens are subject to that requirement. Citizens of Germany, for example, do not require this exit visa. During the Cold War, countries in the Eastern Bloc maintained strict controls on citizens' ability to travel abroad. Citizens of the Soviet Union, East Germany, and other communist states were typically required to obtain permission before travelling abroad. Unlike most of these states, citizens of Yugoslavia enjoyed a significant freedom of international movement. (Note: In 1960, local border traffic on the Yugoslavia — Italy border in Istria registered almost seven million crossings in both directions. In 1977, Yugoslavia had 55 local border traffic agreements with the neighboring countries, including 7 with Italy, 11 with Austria, 8 with Hungary, 10 with Romania, 8 with Bulgaria, and 5 with Greece.)

Certain Asian countries have policies that similarly require specific categories of citizens to obtain official authorization before travelling or emigrating. This is usually either to enforce national service obligations or to protect migrant workers from travelling to places where employers may abuse them. Singapore, for instance, operates an Exit Permit scheme to enforce the national service obligations of its male citizens and permanent residents. These restrictions vary according to age and status. South Korea and Taiwan have similar policies. India, on the other hand, requires citizens who have not met certain educational requirements (and thus may be targeted by human traffickers or be coerced into modern slavery) to apply for approval before leaving the country and endorses their passports with "Emigration Check Required". Nepal similarly requires citizens emigrating to America on an H-1B visa to present an exit permit issued by the Ministry of Labour. This document, called a work permit, must be presented to immigration to leave the country. In a bid to increase protection for the large amount of Indian, Bangladeshi, Chinese, and Nepali citizens smuggled through Indian airports to the Middle East as underpaid labourers, many Indian airline companies require travellers to obtain an 'OK to Board' confirmation sent directly from visa authorities in certain GCC countries directly to the airline and will bar anyone who has not obtained this endorsement from clearing exit immigration.

Eritrea requires the vast majority of its citizens to obtain special authorization to leave the country or even to travel within it.

=== Travel documents ===
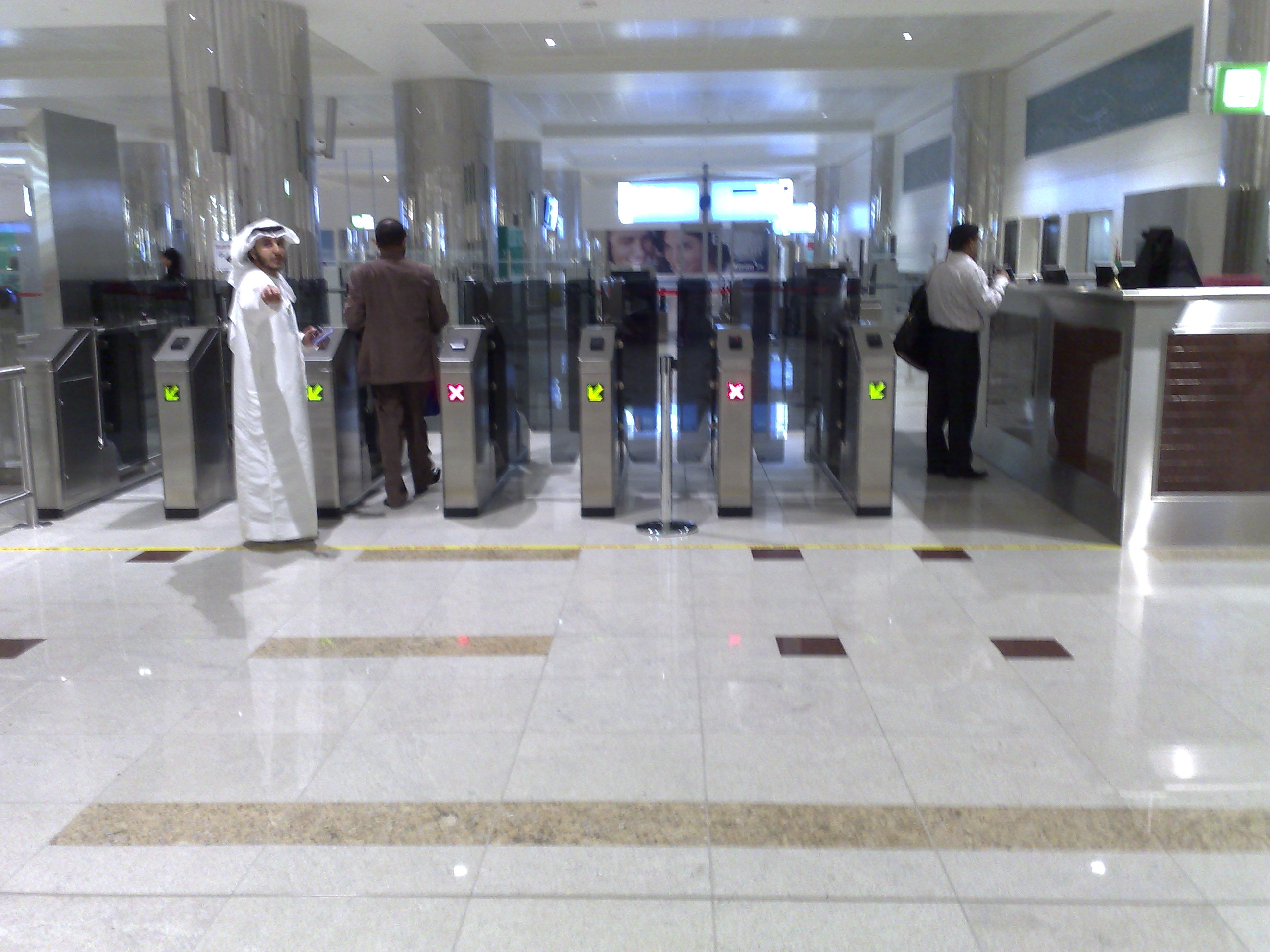
Automated travel document inspection at Dubai Airport

Border control policies typically require travellers to present valid travel documents to ascertain their identity, nationality, permanent residence status, and eligibility to enter a given jurisdiction. The most common form of travel document is the passport, a booklet-form identity document issued by national authorities or the governments of certain subnational territories (Note: The local governments of most inhabited British Overseas Territories issue passports to British Overseas Territories citizens resident holding belonger status in the territory concerned, while the Chinese Special Administrative Regions of Hong Kong and Macau issue passports to Chinese citizens holding permanent residence in the region concerned.) containing an individual's personal information as well as space for the authorities of other jurisdictions to affix stamps, visas, or other permits authorising the bearer to enter, reside, or travel within their territory. Certain jurisdictions permit individuals to clear border controls using identity cards, which typically contain similar personal information.

=== Visas ===
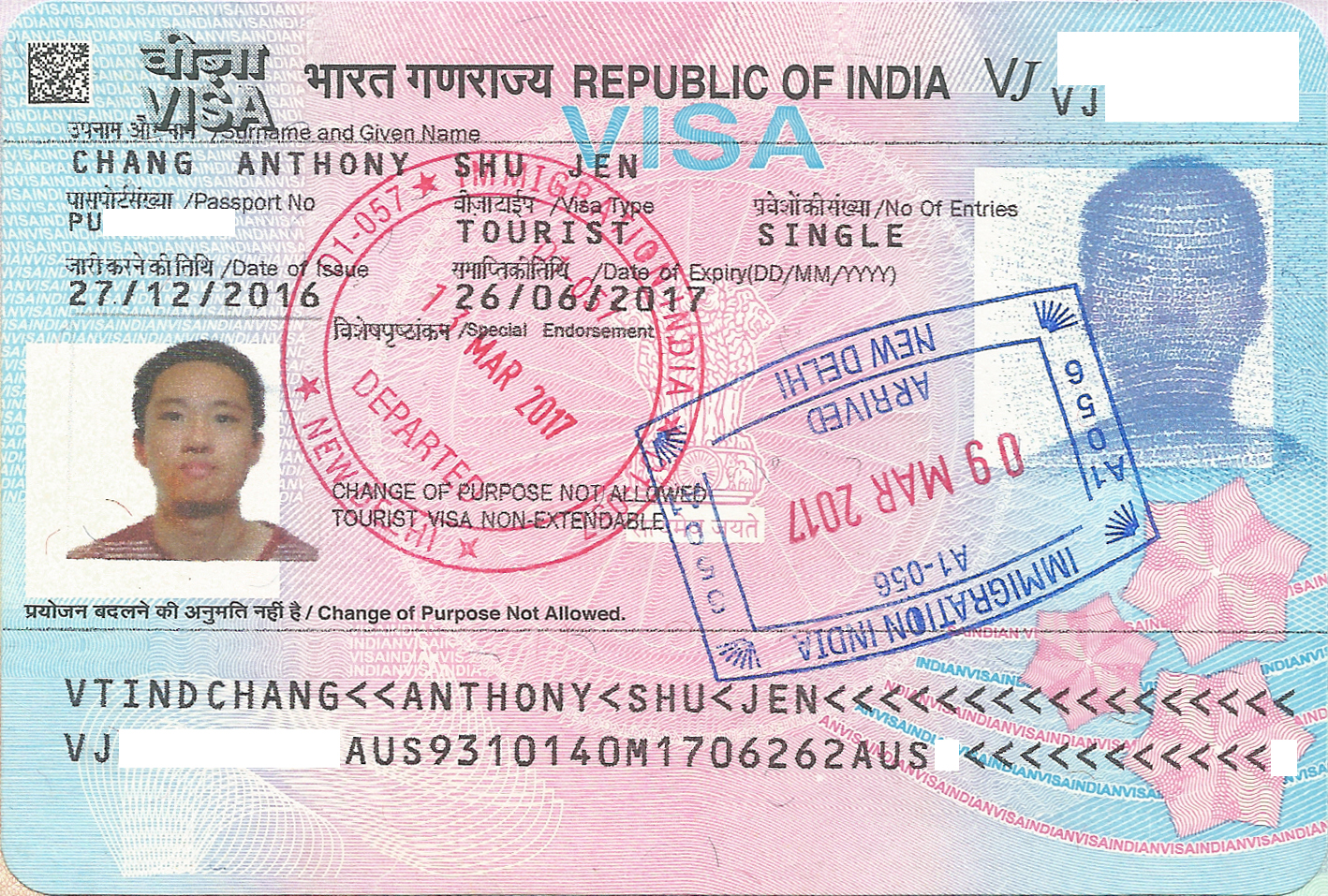
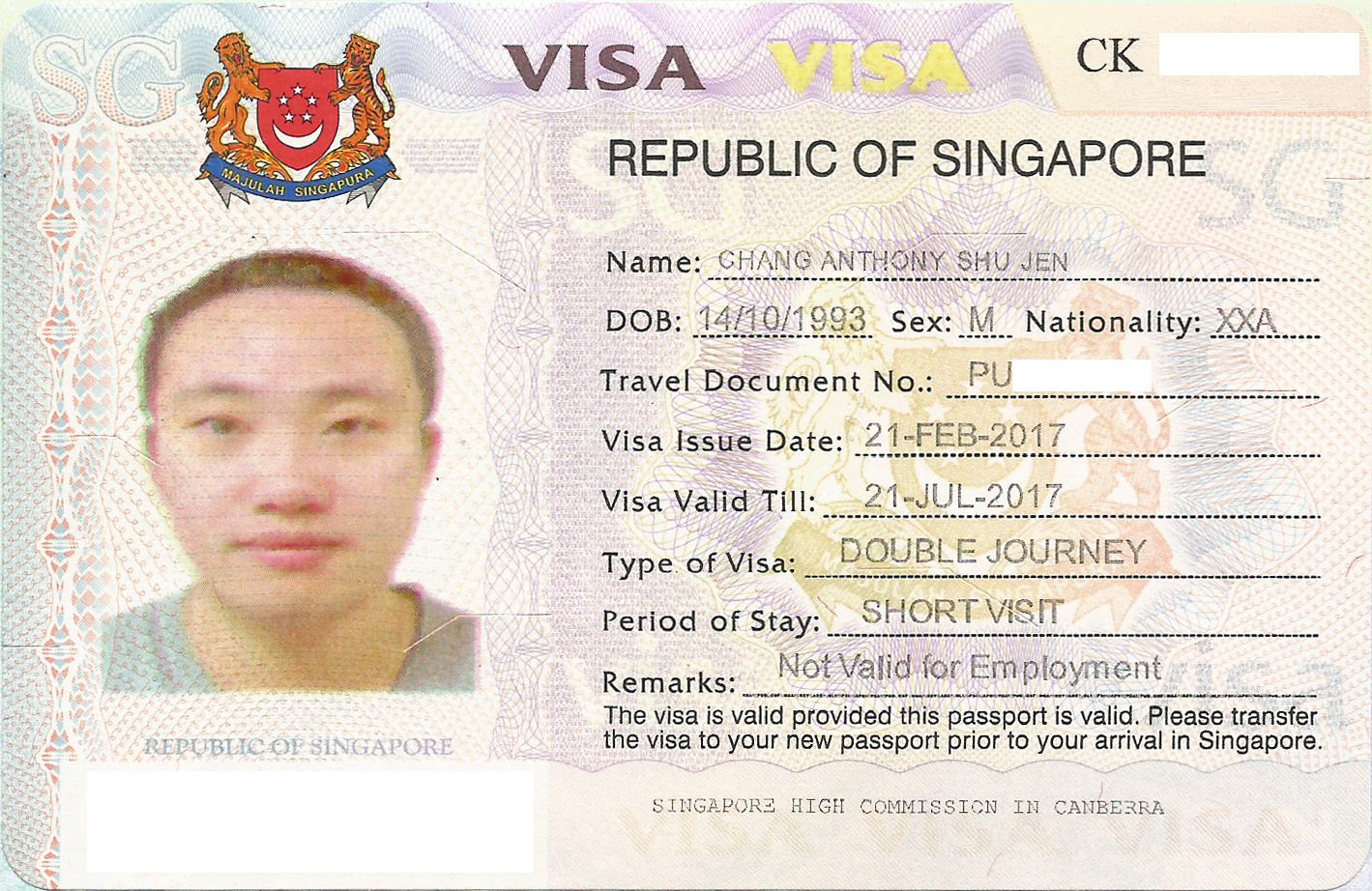
Tourist visas issued by India (left) and Singapore (right) in a stateless person's travel document

Brazilian multiple entry visa in an American passport

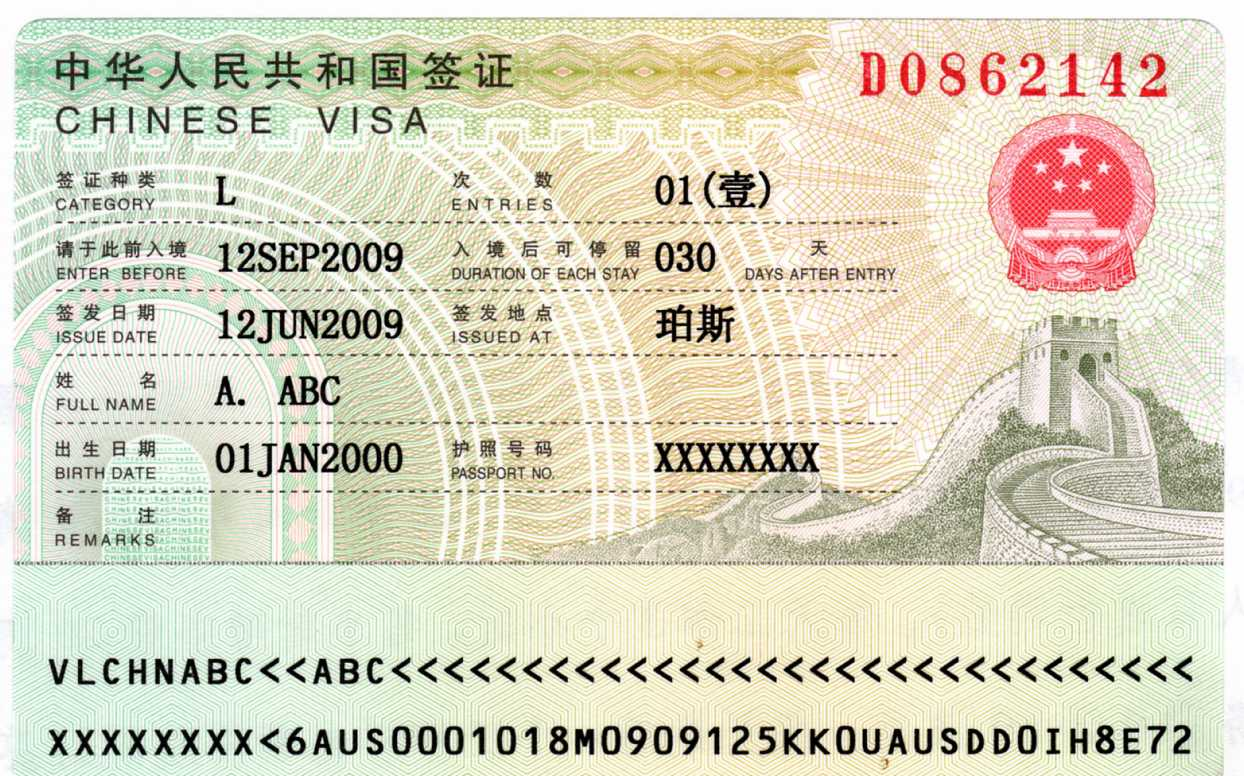
Tourist entry visa for mainland China

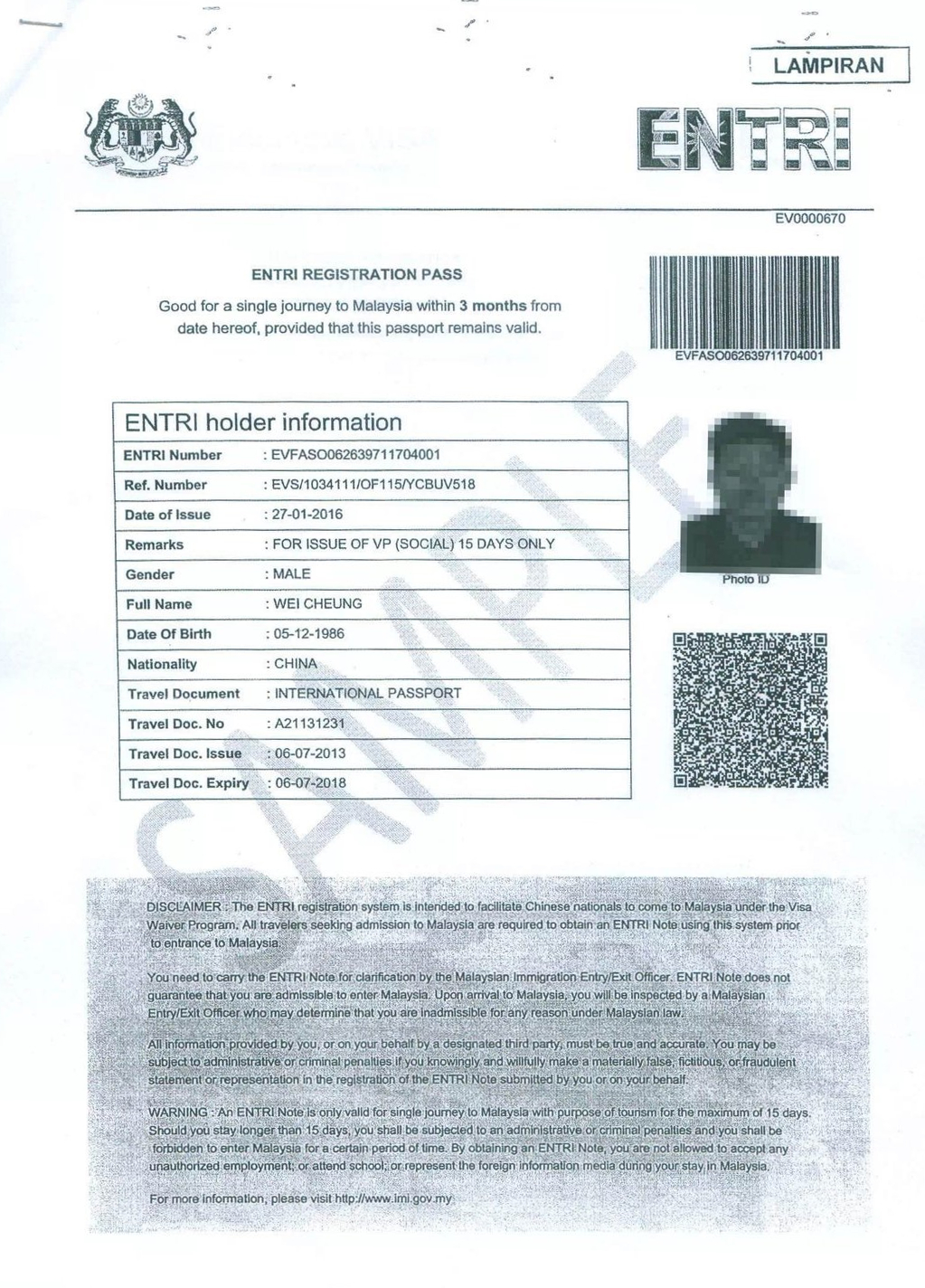
Sample of printed out eNTRI slip for Indian and mainland Chinese citizens to clear Malaysian border controls without a visa

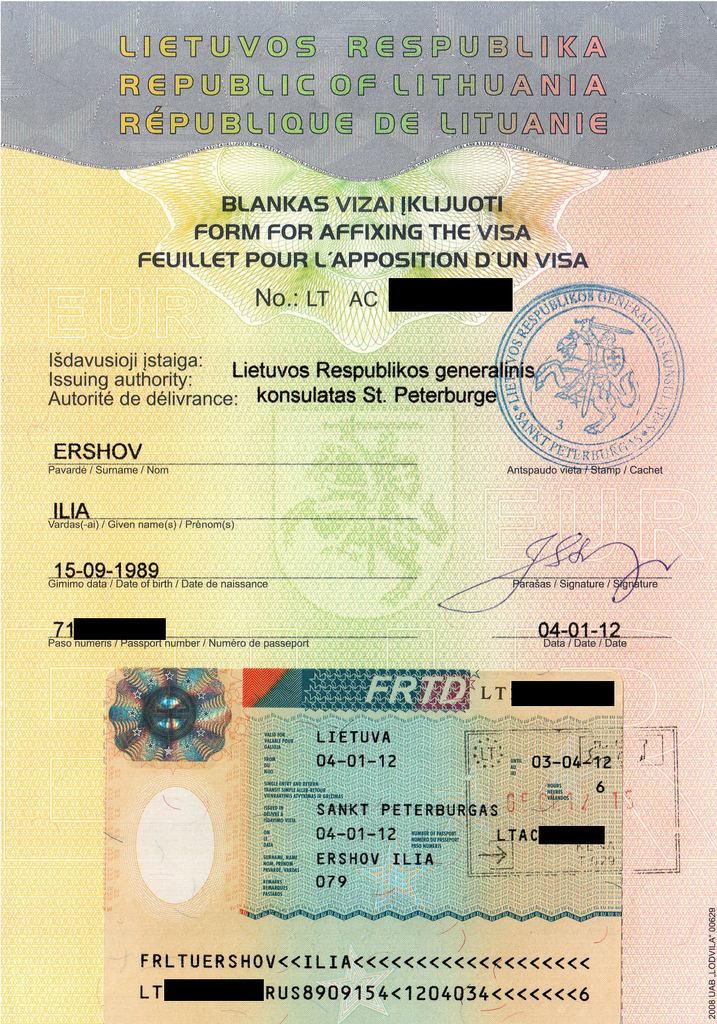
Facilitated Rail Transit Document issued in Saint Petersburg for travel to Kaliningrad

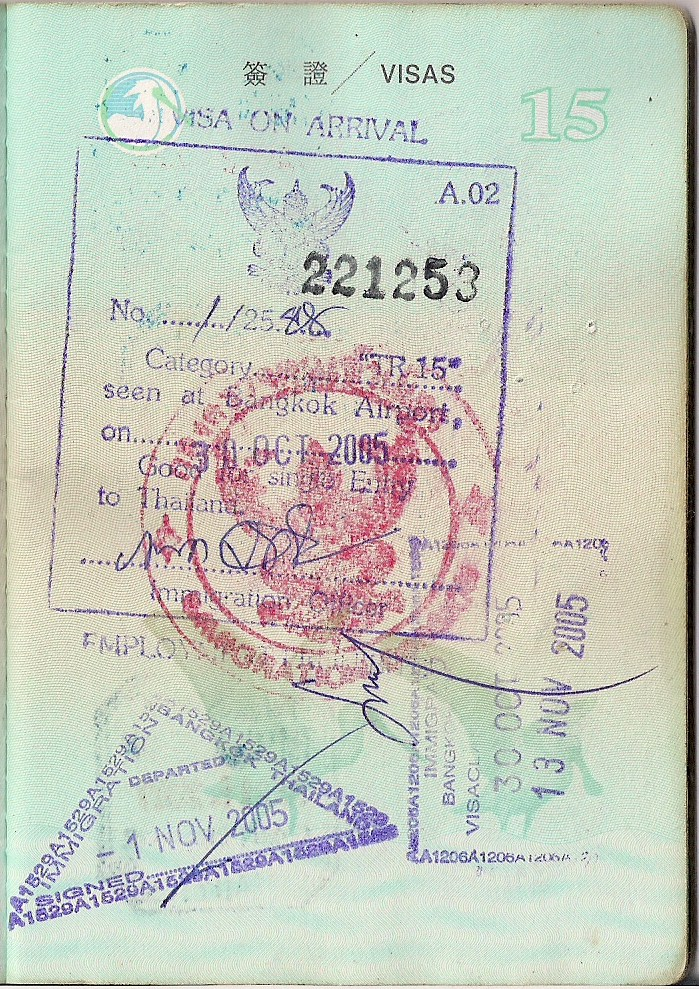
Thai visa issued on arrival in stamp form

A visa is a travel document issued to foreign nationals enabling them to clear border controls. They traditionally take the form of an adhesive sticker or, occasionally, a stamp affixed to a page in an individual's passport or equivalent document. Visas policies different purposes depending on the priorities of each jurisdiction, ranging from ensuring that visitors do not pose a national security risk or have sufficient financial resources to simply functioning as a tax on tourists, as is the case with countries like Mauritius and other leisure destinations which issue visas on arrival, electronic visas, or electronic travel authorisations (ETAs) to most or all visitors. Visas may include limits on the duration of the foreigner's stay, areas within the state they may enter, the dates they may enter, the number of permitted visits, or an individual's right to work in the state in question.

Many countries in Asia have liberalised their visa controls in recent years to encourage transnational business and tourism. For example, India, Myanmar, and Sri Lanka have introduced electronic visas to ease border control for business travellers and tourists. Malaysia has introduced similar eVisa facilities and the eNTRI programme to expedite clearance for Indian and mainland Chinese citizens. Thailand regularly issues visas on arrival to many non-exempt visitors at major ports of entry to encourage tourism. Indonesia, in recent years, has progressively liberalized its visa regime, no longer requiring visas or on-arrival visas from most nationals, while Singapore has signed visa waiver agreements with many countries in recent years and has introduced electronic visa facilities for Indians, Eastern Europeans, and mainland Chinese. This trend towards visa liberalisation in Asia is part of the regional trend toward social and economic globalisation that has been linked to heightened economic growth.

Certain countries, predominantly, though not exclusively, in Western Europe and the Americas, issue working holiday visas for younger visitors to supplement their travel funds by working in minor jobs. These are especially common among members of the European Union and elsewhere in Europe. Saudi Arabia issues a special category visa for people on religious pilgrimage. Similar policies are in force in other countries with significant religious sites. Certain jurisdictions impose special visa requirements on journalists. Countries that require such visas include Cuba, China, North Korea, Saudi Arabia, America, and Zimbabwe.

As a consequence of awkward border situations created by the fall of the Soviet Union, certain former members of the USSR and their neighbours maintain special visa-exemption policies for travellers transiting across international boundaries within a single country. For instance, Russia permits vehicles to transit through the Saatse Boot between the Estonian villages of Lutepää and Sesniki without a visa or border checkpoint, provided they do not stop. Similar provisions apply to the issuance of Facilitated Rail Transit Documents by Schengen Area members for travel between Kaliningrad Oblast and the Russian mainland, enabling Russian citizens to travel to and from the exclave without a passport or visa.

Many countries allow individuals to clear border controls with foreign visas. (Note: For instance, the following jurisdictions permit visitors to use American visas to clear border controls: Albania — 90 days; Antigua and Barbuda — 30 days; USD 100 visa waiver fee applies.; Belize — 30 days; USD 50 visa waiver fee applies.; Bosnia and Herzegovina — 30 days; Canada — up to 6 months; only for citizens of Brazil, arriving by air with Electronic Travel Authorisation (ETA).; Chile — 90 days; for nationals of China only.; Colombia — 90 days; applicable to certain nationalities only.; Costa Rica — 30 days or less if the visa is about to expire; must hold a multiple-entry visa.; Dominican Republic — 90 days; El Salvador — 90 days; not applicable to all nationalities.; Georgia — 90 days within any 180-day period; Guatemala — 90 days; not applicable to all nationalities.; Honduras — 90 days; not applicable to all nationalities.; Jamaica — 30 days; not applicable to all nationalities.; Mexico — 180 days; Montenegro — 30 days; Nicaragua — 90 days; not applicable to all nationalities.; North Macedonia — 15 days; Oman — certain nationalities can obtain an electronic Omani visa if holding a valid American visa.; Panama — 30/180 days; must hold a visa valid for at least 2 more entries.; Peru — 180 days; applicable to nationals of China and India only.; Philippines — 7 days for nationals of China from the mainland; 14 days for nationals of India.; Qatar — Non-visa-free nationals can obtain an ETA for 30 days if holding a valid American visa.; Republic of China (Taiwan) — certain nationalities can obtain an online travel authorisation if holding a valid American visa.; São Tomé and Príncipe — 15 days; Serbia — 90 days; South Korea — 30 days; Turkey — certain nationalities can obtain an electronic Turkish visa if holding a valid American visa.; UAE — Visa on arrival for 14 days; for nationals of India only. (Applicable for Indian citizens holding an American Green Card.)) Notably, the Philippines permits nationals of India and China can use any of several foreign visas to clear border controls. (Note: Nationals of China from the Mainland travelling as tourists and holding a valid visa issued by Australia, Canada, Japan, America, or a Schengen Area state may enter and stay without a visa for up to 7 days. Nationals of India holding a valid tourist, business, or resident visa issued by Australia, Canada, Japan, Singapore, the United Kingdom, America, or a Schengen Area state may enter and stay without a visa for up to 14 days. They may enter from any port of entry.) To encourage tourism by transit passengers, South Korea permits passengers in transit who would otherwise require a South Korean visa to enter for up to thirty days utilizing an Australian, Canadian, American, or Schengen visa. Uniquely, the British territory of Bermuda has ceased issuing its own visas and now requires travellers to either clear immigration visa-free in one of the three countries (Canada, America, and the United Kingdom) to/from which it has direct flights, or hold a visa for one of them.

=== Electronic visas and electronic travel authorisations ===
Beginning in the 2000s, many countries introduced e-visas and electronic travel authorisations (ETAs) as an alternative to traditional visas. An ETA is a form of pre-arrival registration, which may or may not be officially classified as a visa depending on the issuing jurisdiction, and is required for foreign travellers who are exempt from obtaining a full visa. In contrast to the procedures that typically apply regarding proper visas, under which the traveller normally has no recourse if rejected, if an ETA is rejected, the traveller can choose to apply for a visa instead. In contrast, an e-visa is a visa that travellers can apply for and obtain online, without visiting the issuing state's consular mission or visa agency. The following jurisdictions require certain categories of international travellers to hold an ETA or e-visa to clear border controls upon arrival:

- Australia:
  - Electronic Travel Authority (ETA)
  - eVisitor programme
- East African Community: From February 2014, Kenya, Rwanda and Uganda issue an East African Tourist Visa.
- Hong Kong: Mainland Travel Permit for Taiwan Residents
- India: India permits nationals of most jurisdictions (Note: This includes nationals of: All European Union citizens; British Overseas Territories citizens of: Anguilla; Cayman Islands; Montserrat; Turks and Caicos Islands; Afghanistan; Albania; Andorra; Angola; Antigua and Barbuda; Argentina; Armenia; Australia; Azerbaijan; Bahamas; Barbados; Belarus; Belize; Benin; Bolivia; Bosnia and Herzegovina; Botswana; Brazil; Brunei; Burundi; Cambodia; Cameroon; Cape Verde; Chile; Colombia; Comoros; Costa Rica; Cuba; Djibouti; Dominica; Dominican Republic; East Timor; Ecuador; El Salvador; Equatorial Guinea; Eritrea; Eswatini; Fiji; Gabon; Gambia; Georgia; Ghana; Grenada; Guatemala; Guinea; Guyana; Haiti; Honduras; Iceland; Israel; Ivory Coast; Jamaica; Japan; Jordan; Kenya; Kiribati; Laos; Lesotho; Liberia; Liechtenstein; Madagascar; Malawi; Mali; Marshall Islands; Mauritius; Mexico; Micronesia; Moldova; Monaco; Mongolia; Montenegro; Mozambique; Myanmar; Namibia; Nauru; New Zealand; Cook Islands; Niue; Nicaragua; Niger; North Macedonia; Norway; Oman; Palau; Palestine; Panama; Papua New Guinea; Paraguay; Peru; Philippines; Russia; Rwanda; Saint Kitts and Nevis; Saint Lucia; Saint Vincent and the Grenadines; Samoa; San Marino; Senegal; Serbia; Seychelles; Sierra Leone; Singapore; Solomon Islands; South Africa; South Korea; Suriname; Switzerland; Taiwan; Tanzania; Thailand; Togo; Tonga; Trinidad and Tobago; Tuvalu; Uganda; Ukraine; United Arab Emirates; United States; Uruguay; Vanuatu; Vatican City; Venezuela; Vietnam; Zambia; Zimbabwe) to clear border controls using an e-visa. (Note: Ahmedabad; Amritsar; Bagdogra; Bengaluru; Chandigarh; Chennai; Coimbatore; Delhi; Gaya; Goa; Guwahati; Hyderabad; Jaipur; Kochi; Kolkata; Kozhikode; Lucknow; Madurai; Mangaluru; Mumbai; Nagpur; Pune; Thiruvananthapuram; Tiruchirappalli; Varanasi; Visakhapatnam; Vijayawada) (Note: Cochin; Goa; Mangalore)
- Kenya: From 1 January 2021, Kenya solely issues e-visas, and physical visas are no longer available.
- New Zealand: Electronic Travel Authority (NZeTA)
- North America: Canadian ETA, US Electronic System for Travel Authorisation
- Pakistan: Pakistani ETA. (Note: Eligible jurisdictions are as follows: Angola; Argentina; Australia; Austria; Azerbaijan; Bahamas; Bahrain; Barbados; Botswana; Brunei; Canada; China; Costa Rica; Finland; France; Germany; Ghana; Iceland; Indonesia; Iran; Italy; Japan; Jordan; Kuwait; Lithuania; Luxembourg; Malaysia; Maldives; Malta; Monaco; Mozambique; Nepal; Netherlands; New Zealand; Norway; Oman; Paraguay; Philippines; Poland; Qatar; Russia; Rwanda; Saint Kitts and Nevis; Saint Lucia; Samoa; Saudi Arabia; Singapore; South Africa; South Korea; Spain; Sri Lanka; Sweden; Switzerland; Tajikistan; Tanzania; Thailand; Tonga; Trinidad and Tobago; Tunisia; Turkey; United Arab Emirates; United Kingdom; United States; Zambia)
- South Korea: eligible visa-free visitors must obtain Korea Electronic Travel Authorization (K-ETA).
- Sri Lanka: Sri Lankan ETA
- Qatar: ETA needed for up to 30 days.
- United Kingdom: Electronic Visa Waiver, or EVW (Note: A holder of an EVW authorisation can visit and/or study in the UK for up to 6 months without a visa. An EVW is only valid for one entry, and a new EVW must be obtained each time an eligible person wishes to enter the UK to visit and/or study for up to 6 months without a visa. The EVW is valid for up to 90 days of visits to Ireland once a holder has cleared immigration in the United Kingdom.) The Nationality and Borders Bill, before the parliament in Spring 2022, includes a proposal to introduce the Electronic Travel Authorisation system for all non-UK and Irish citizens.

=== Nationality and travel history ===
Many nations implement border controls restricting the entry of people of certain nationalities or who have visited certain countries. For instance, Georgia refuses entry to holders of passports issued by the Republic of China. Similarly, since April 2017, nationals of Bangladesh, Pakistan, Sudan, Syria, Yemen, and Iran have been banned from entering the parts of eastern Libya under the control of the Tobruk government. The majority of Arab countries, as well as Iran and Malaysia, ban Israeli citizens, however exceptional entry to Malaysia is possible with approval from the Ministry of Home Affairs. Certain countries may also restrict entry to those with Israeli stamps or visas in their passports. As a result of tension over the Artsakh dispute, Azerbaijan currently forbids entry to Armenian citizens as well as to individuals with proof of travel to Artsakh.

Between September 2017 and January 2021, the United States did not issue new visas to nationals of Iran, North Korea, Libya, Somalia, Syria, or Yemen pursuant to restrictions imposed by the Trump administration, which were subsequently repealed by the Biden administration on 20 January 2021. While in force, the restrictions were conditional and could be lifted if the countries affected meet the required security standards specified by the Trump administration, and dual citizens of these countries could still enter if they presented a passport from a non-designated country.

=== Prescreening ===
A significant number of countries maintain prescreening facilities for passengers departing from other jurisdictions to clear border controls before arrival, thereby skipping checkpoints upon arrival. Aside from simplifying arrival formalities, this enables border control authorities to deny entry to potentially inadmissible travellers before they embark and to reduce congestion at border checkpoints at ports of arrival.

- Hong Kong and mainland China: There are two border crossings between Hong Kong and mainland China at which border controls imposed by the two jurisdictions are colocated:
  - West Kowloon Railway Station (simplified Chinese: 香港西九龙站; traditional Chinese: 香港西九龍站): A component of the Guangzhou–Shenzhen–Hong Kong Express Rail Link (Chinese: 廣深港高速鐵路; pinyin: Guǎng–Shēn–Gǎng Gāosù Tiělù), West Kowloon Station contains a "Mainland Port Area (simplified Chinese: 站内地口岸区; traditional Chinese: 站內地口岸區)", essentially enabling passengers and goods to clear mainland Chinese immigration on Hong Kong soil.
  - Shenzhen Bay Port (simplified Chinese: 深圳湾口岸; traditional Chinese: 深圳灣口岸): The land border checkpoint at Shenzhen Bay Port in the mainland contains a Hong Kong Port Area (simplified Chinese: 港方口岸区; traditional Chinese: 港方口岸區) which enables passengers and goods to clear Hong Kong border controls in the mainland. The checkpoint is located in mainland China on land leased from the city of Shenzhen in Guangdong province. By enabling travellers to clear both Chinese and Hong Kong border controls at a single location, it eliminates the need for a second checkpoint on the Hong Kong side of the Shenzhen Bay Bridge.
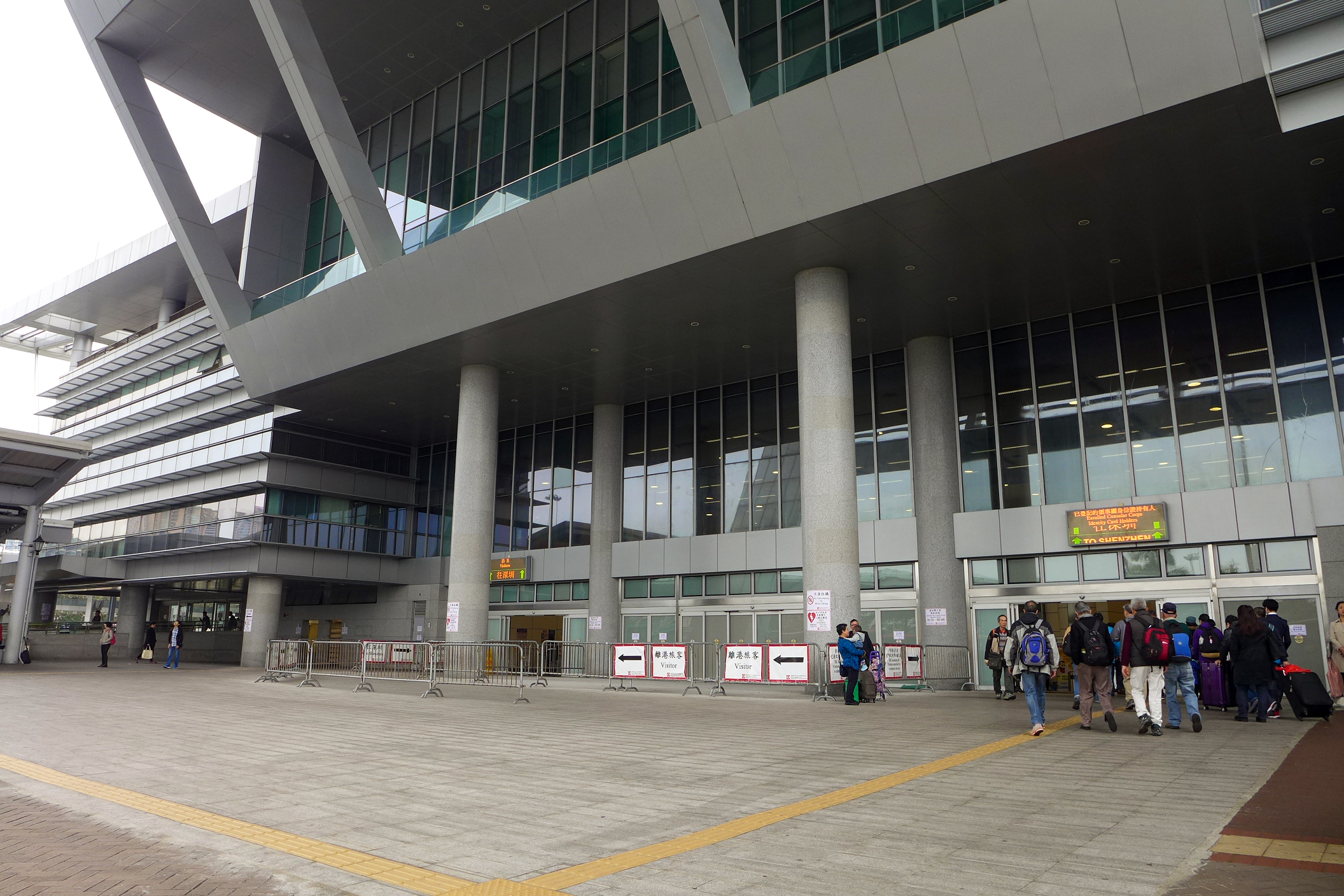
Entrance of the Hong Kong Port Area of the Shenzhen Bay Port Passenger Terminal Building

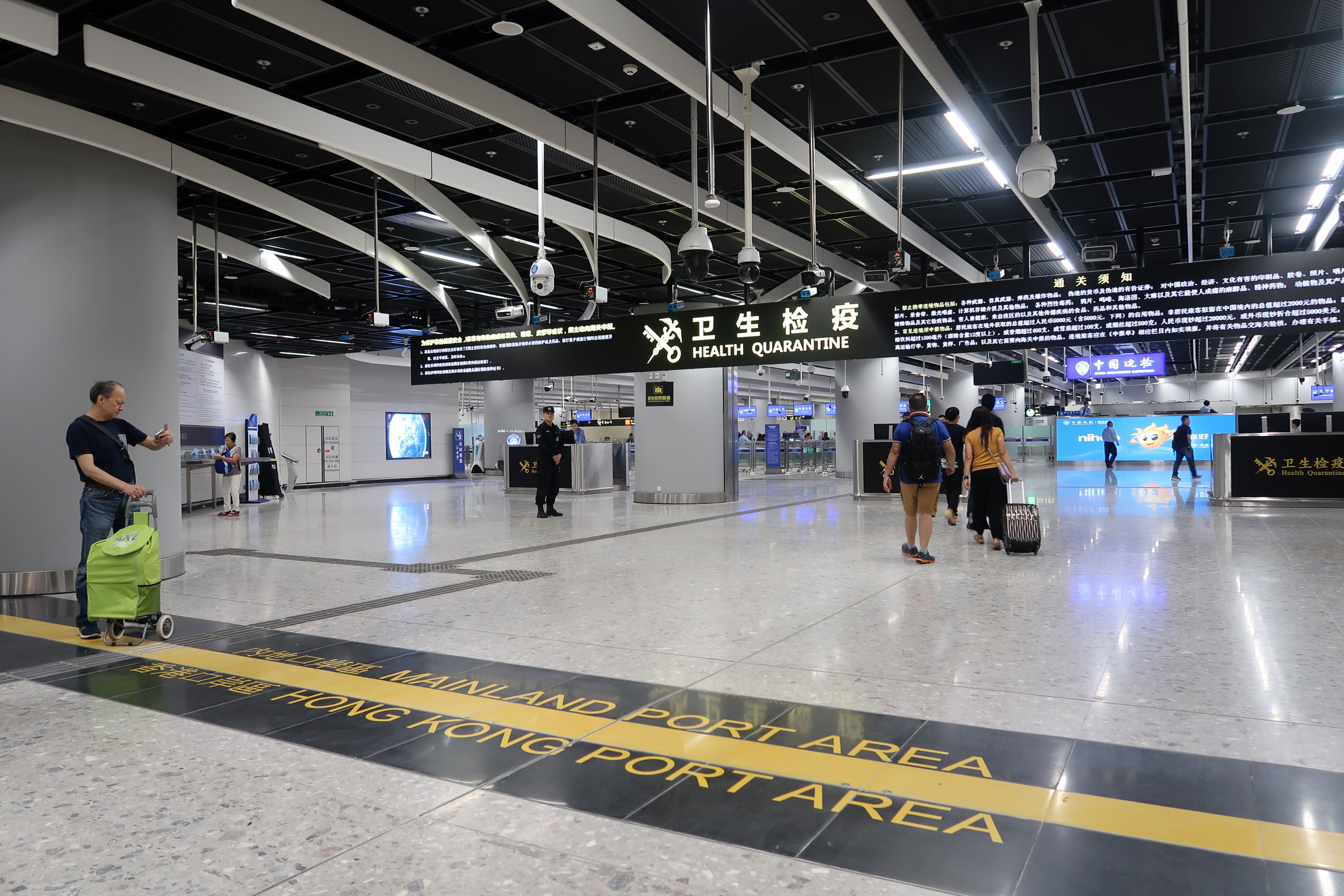
Entrance of the Mainland Port Area at West Kowloon Station

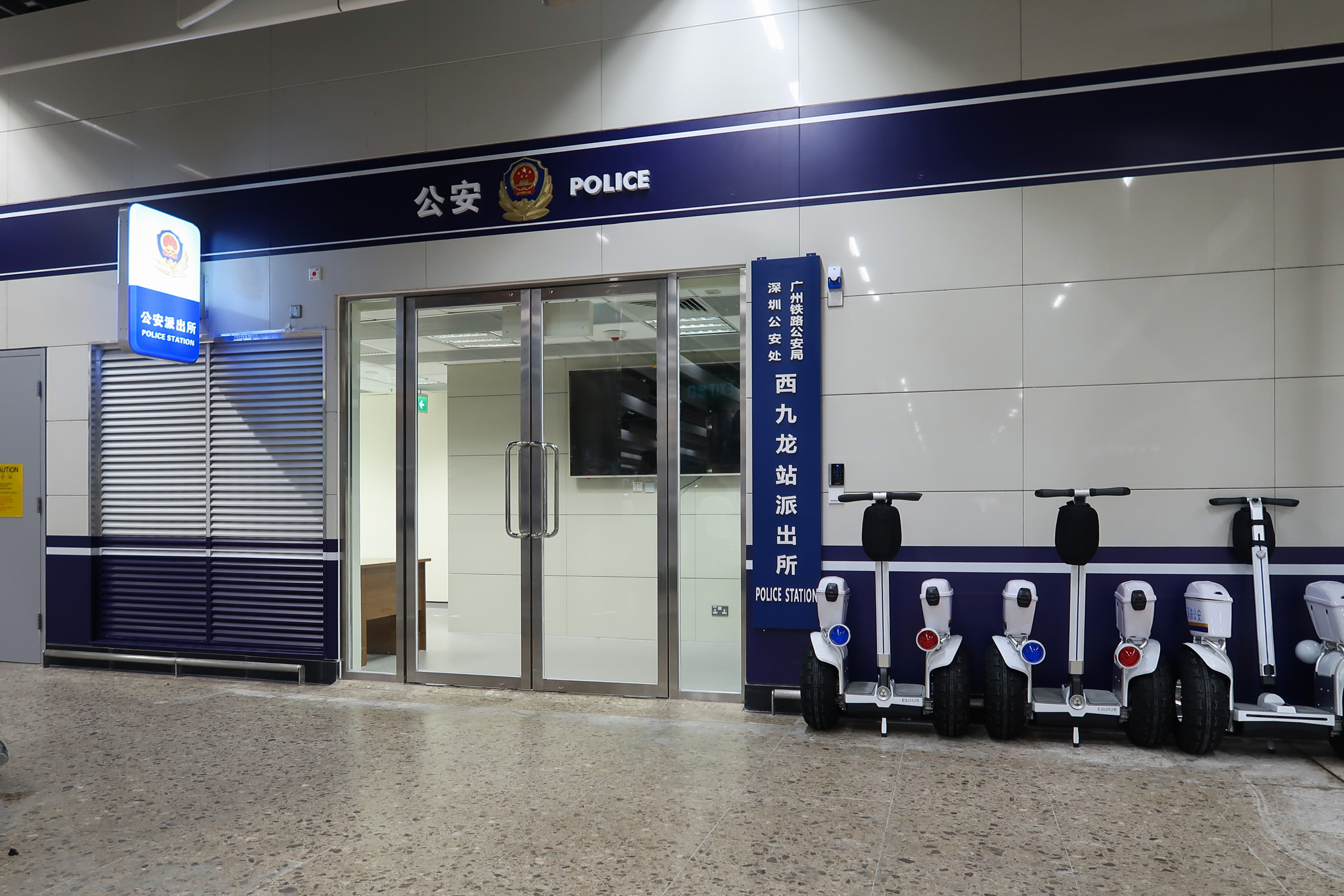
Mainland Chinese police station in the Mainland Port Area

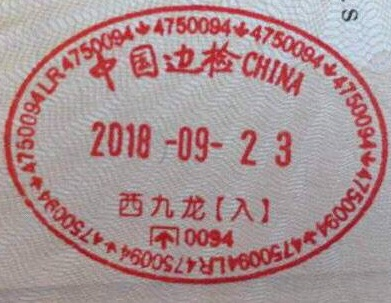
Mainland Chinese entry stamp issued at Hong Kong West Kowloon railway station

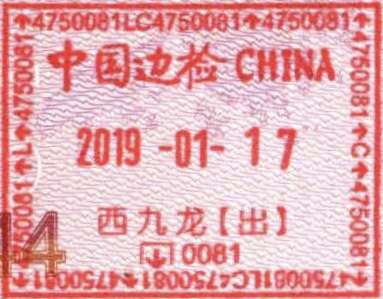
Mainland Chinese exit stamp issued at Hong Kong West Kowloon railway station in a Chinese passport

Map of the upcoming Rapid Transit system

- Singapore and Malaysia:
  - Woodlands Train Checkpoint (Malay: Pusat Pemeriksaan Kereta Api Woodlands, Chinese: 兀兰火车关卡, Tamil: ஊட்லண்ட்ஸ் இரயில் மசாதலைச்சாவடிப): For cross-border rail passengers, Singaporean exit and Malaysian entry preclearance border controls are co-located at the Woodlands Train Checkpoint in Singapore, whilst Malaysian exit controls are located separately at Johor Bahru Sentral railway station in Malaysia.
  - Johor Bahru – Singapore Rapid Transit System (Malay: Sistem Transit Aliran Johor Bahru–Singapura, Chinese: 新山－新加坡捷运系统, Tamil: ஜோகூர் பாரு – சிங்கப்பூர் விரைவான போக்குவரத்து அமைப்பு, RTS): The upcoming RTS connecting Singapore and Johor Bahru will feature border control preclearance both on the Singaporean side and on the Malaysian side. This will enable passengers arriving in Singapore from Malaysia or vice versa to proceed straight to their connecting transport, since the RTS will link to both the Singapore MRT system (Thomson–East Coast Line) and Johor Bahru Sentral. Unlike the preclearance systems adopted in America and Hong Kong, but similar to the United Kingdom's juxtaposed controls, this system will mitigate the need for arrival border controls on both sides of the border.
- Malaysia and Thailand:
  - Padang Besar railway station (Thai: สถานีรถไฟปาดังเบซาร์, Malay: Stesen keretapi Padang Besar): The Padang Besar railway station in Padang Besar, Malaysia has co-located border control facilities for both Malaysia and Thailand. However, the station is entirely within Malaysian territory (albeit just 200 metres south of the Malaysia-Thailand border). The facilities for each country operate from separate counters inside the railway station building at the platform level. Passengers entering Thailand clear Malaysian and Thai border formalities here in Malaysian territory before boarding their State Railway of Thailand trains which then cross the actual borderline several minutes after departing the station. Passengers from Thailand entering Malaysia are also processed here using the same counters, as there are no separate counters for entry and exit in either country.
- United Kingdom and the Schengen Area: Border control for travel between the United Kingdom and the Schengen Area features significant prescreening under the juxtaposed controls programme for travel both by ferry and rail. This includes customs and immigration prescreening on both sides of the Channel Tunnel, (Note: To facilitate juxtaposed controls, the United Kingdom and France established or "control zones" at both ends of the Channel Tunnel, per which British authorities exercise authority within the control zone on the French side, and French authorities exercise authority within the control zone on the UK side, under a system of juxtaposed controls. Violations in the control zone are treated as if they occurred within the adjoining state's territory, and extradition is not required to remove a violator to the operating state for prosecution. Officers of the adjoining state may carry firearms within the control zone.) and immigration-only prescreening for ferry passengers and on the Eurostar between the United Kingdom and stations located in Belgium, France, and the Netherlands. Eurostar and Eurotunnel passengers departing from the Schengen area go through both French, Dutch, or Belgian exit border control and British entry border controls before departures, while passengers departing from the United Kingdom, including those departing for Belgium or the Netherlands, undergo French border controls on British soil. For travel by ferry, French entry border control for ferries between Dover and Calais or Dunkerque takes place at the Port of Dover, whilst French exit and British entry border control take place at Calais and Dunkerque. For rail travel, 12 border control checkpoints are currently in operation. (Note: Currently operational rail checkpoints include: In Belgium; Brussel-Zuid/Bruxelles-Midi; In France; Bourg-Saint-Maurice; Calais-Fréthun; Coquelles; Gare du Nord; Lille-Europe; Moûtiers; In the Netherlands: Rotterdam Centraal station; Amsterdam Centraal station; In the UK; Ashford International; Ebbsfleet International; St Pancras International)
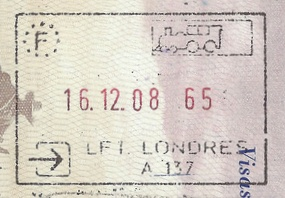
Entry stamp into the Schengen Area issued by the French Border Police at St Pancras International station ('LFT' stands for 'Liaison fixe transmanche' (literally: cross-Channel fixed link).)

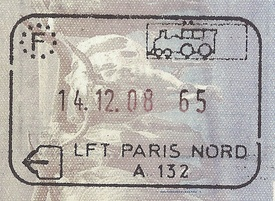
Exit stamp from the Schengen Area issued by the French Border Police at Gare du Nord

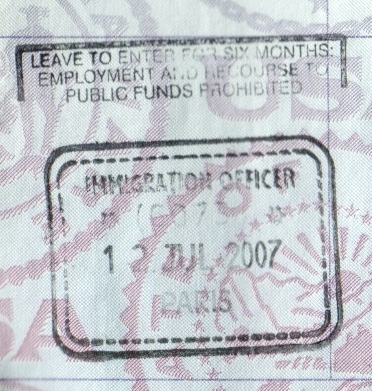
British entry stamp issued by the UK Border Force at Gare du Nord

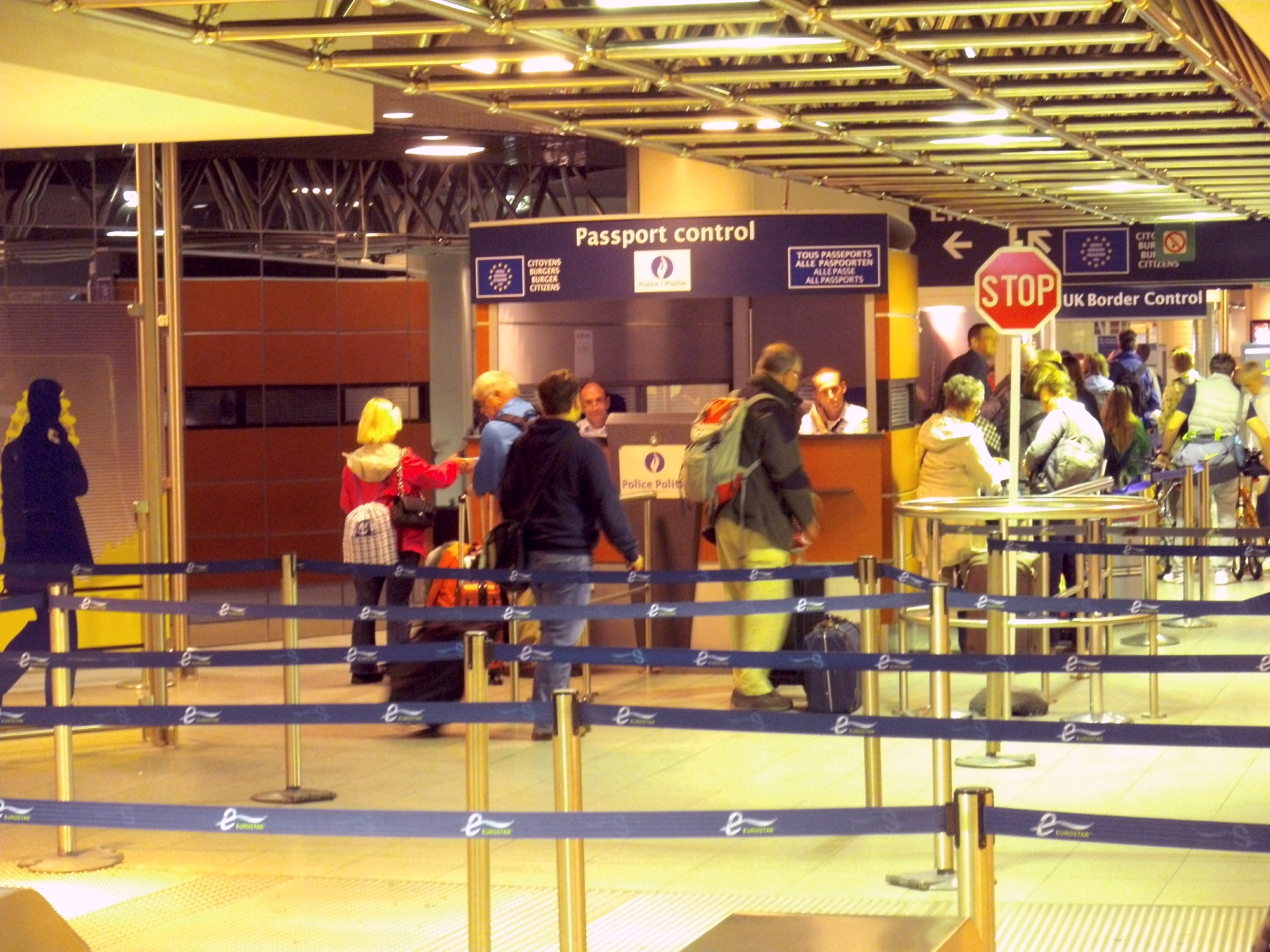
Juxtaposed immigration controls at Brussel-Zuid/Bruxelles-Midi railway station, with the Belgian Federal Police carrying out exit immigration checks from the Schengen Area in front, and the UK Border Force carrying UK entry immigration checks behind

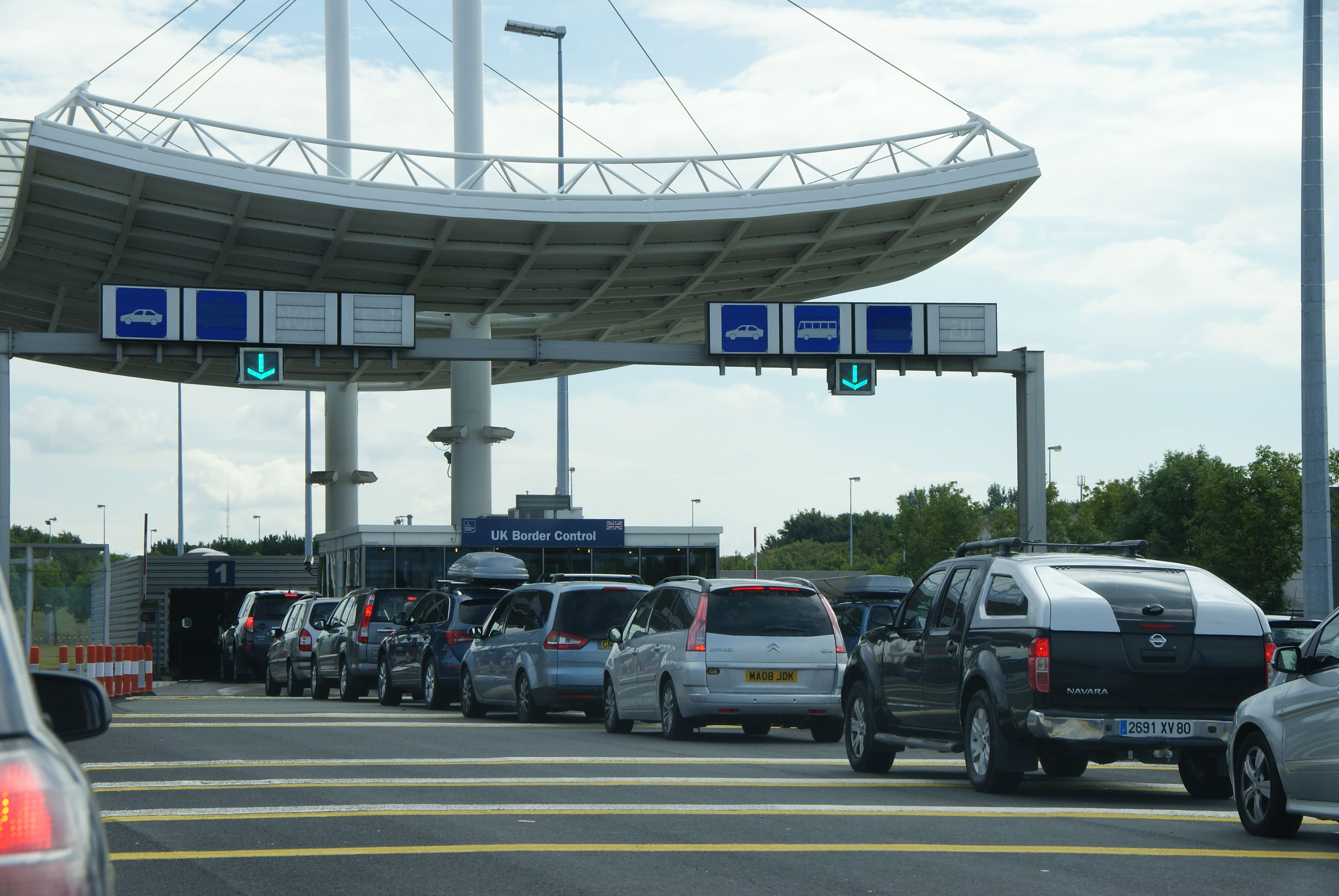
UK Border Force checkpoint at the Eurotunnel Calais Terminal, where entry checks are carried out before boarding the train to the UK

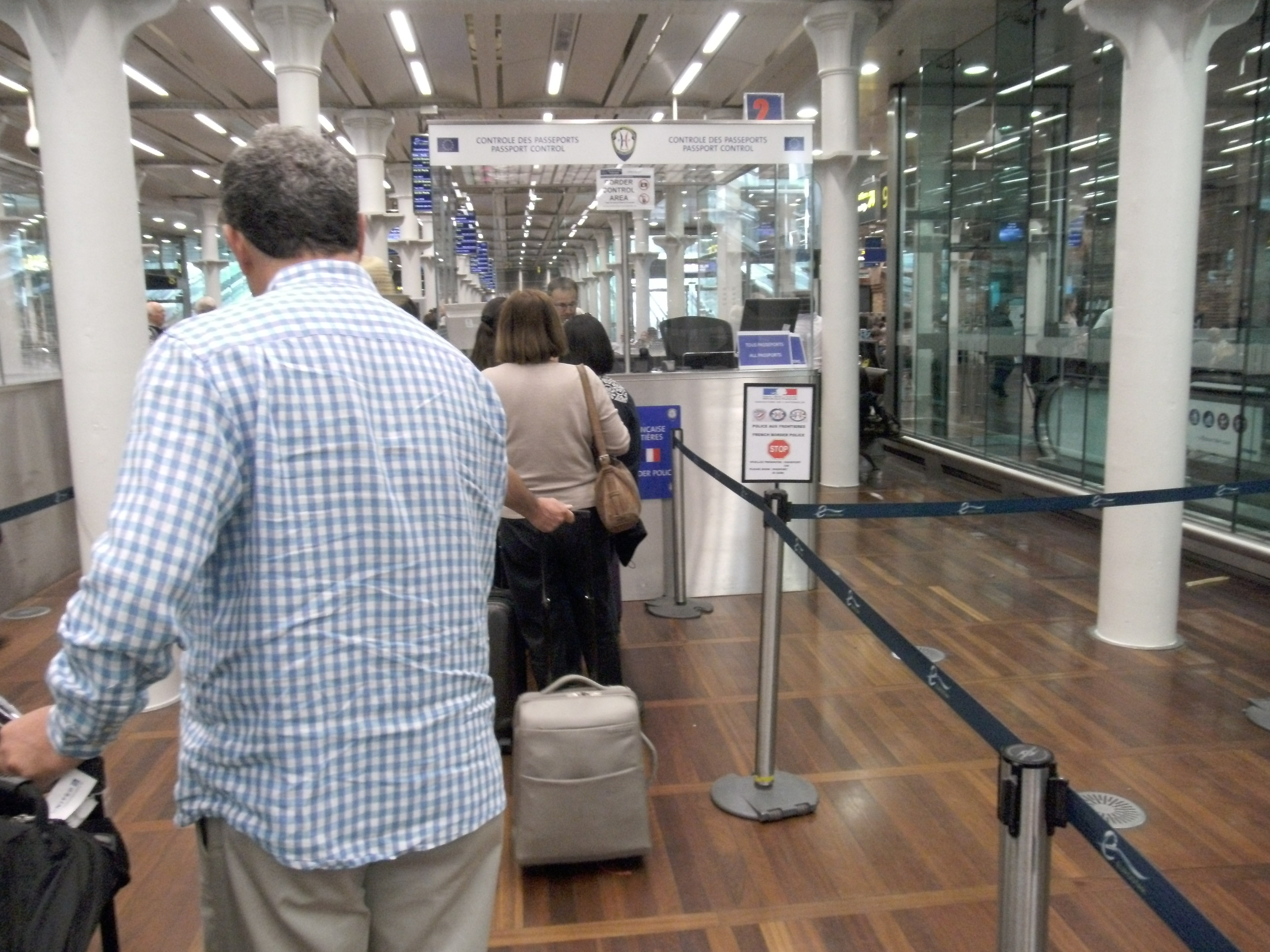
French Border Police checkpoint at London St Pancras International station, where entry immigration checks to the Schengen Area are carried out before boarding the train
- United States: The U.S. government operates border preclearance facilities at several ports and airports in foreign territory. They are staffed and operated by U.S. Customs and Border Protection officers. Travellers pass through the U.S. Immigration and Customs, Public Health, and Agriculture inspections before boarding their aircraft, ship, or train. This process is intended to streamline border procedures, reduce congestion at ports of entry, and facilitate travel between the preclearance location and American airports that are not equipped to handle international travellers. These facilities are present at the majority of major Canadian airports, as well as selected airports in Bermuda, Aruba, the Bahamas, Abu Dhabi and Ireland. Facilities located in Canada accept NEXUS cards and United States Passport cards (land/sea entry only) in place of passports. A preclearance facility is currently being planned at Dubai International Airport. Citizens of the Bahamas who enter United States through either of the two preclearance facilities in that country enjoy an exemption from the general requirement to hold a visa as long as they can sufficiently prove that they do not have a significant criminal record in either the Bahamas or the U.S. All Bahamians applying for admission at a port-of-entry other than the preclearance facilities located in Nassau or Freeport International airports are required to have a valid visa. Preclearance facilities are also operated at Pacific Central Station, the Port of Vancouver, and the Port of Victoria in British Columbia. There are plans to open one at Montreal Central Station in Quebec.
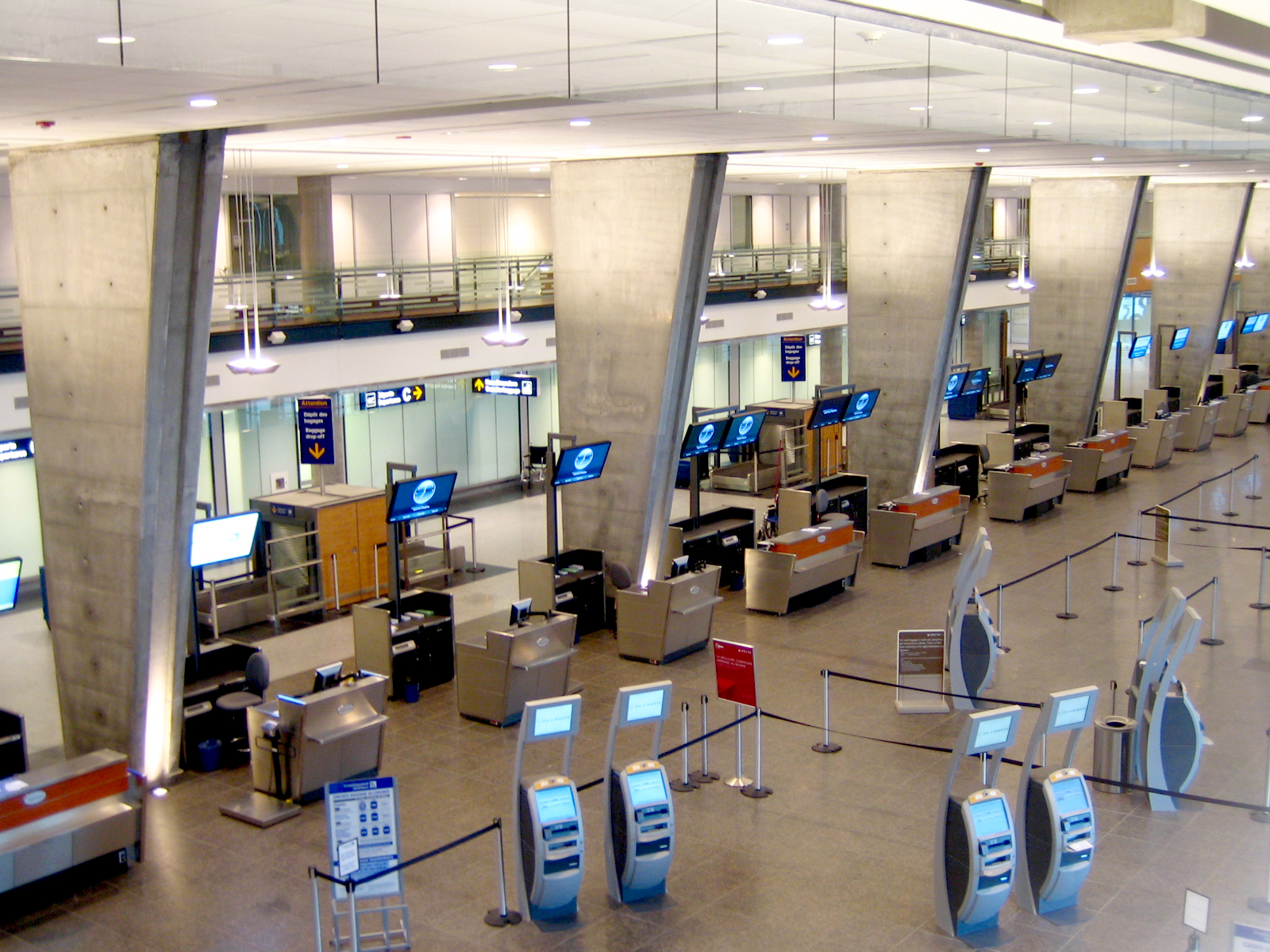
The interior of the U.S. preclearance departures at Montréal

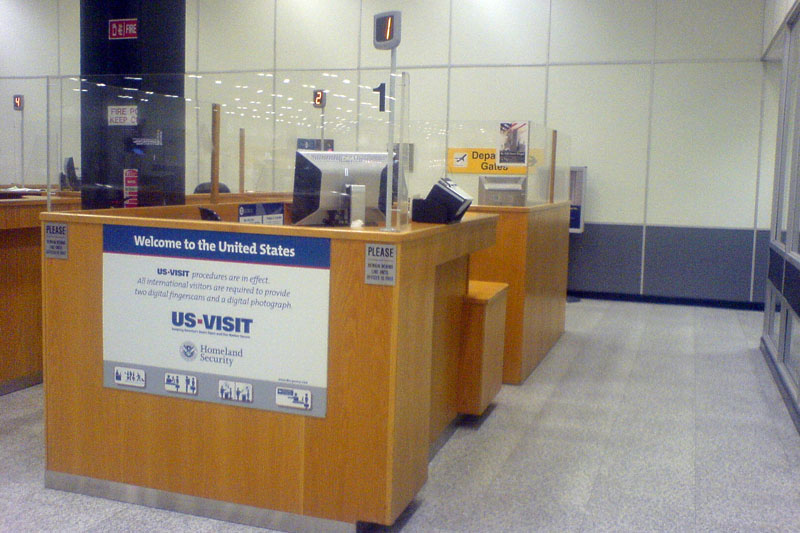
Shannon Airport preclearance

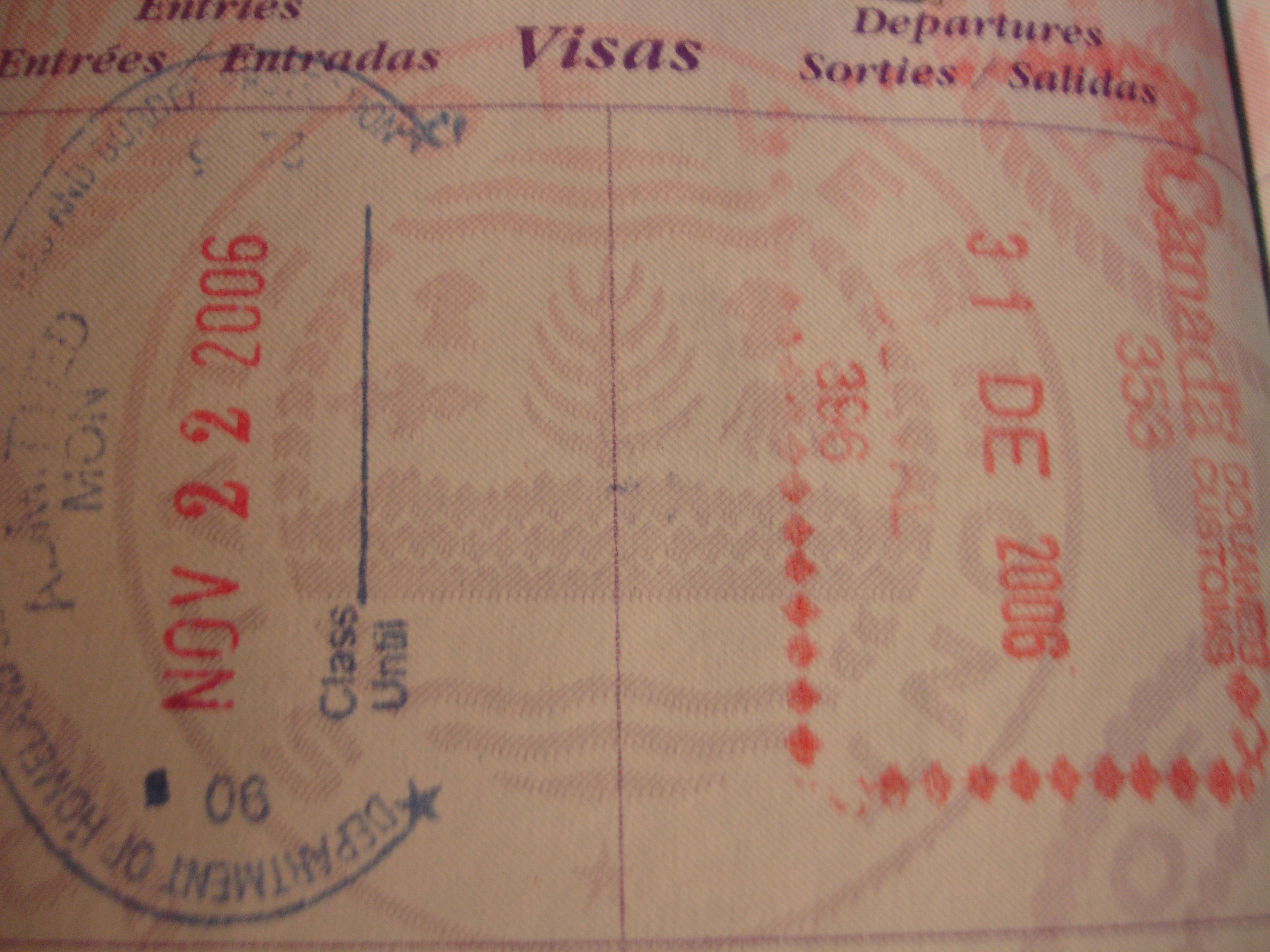
Canadian and U.S. stamps in an U.S. passport, both issued in Montréal
- Informal prescreening: In some cases, countries can introduce controls that function as border controls but are not border controls legally, and do not need to be performed by government agencies. Normally, they are performed and organised by private companies, under a law that requires them to check whether passengers are allowed to travel to a specific country. Such controls can take effect in one country based on the laws of another country, without any formalised border-control prescreening agreement in force. Even if they are not, border controls function as such. The most prominent example is airlines that check passports and visas before passengers are allowed to board. Also, for some passenger boats, such checks are performed before boarding.

== Expedited border controls ==
Certain countries and trade blocs establish programmes for high-frequency and/or low-risk travellers to expedite border controls, subjecting them to lighter or automated checks or priority border-control facilities. In some countries, citizens or residents have access to automated facilities not available to foreigners. The following expedited border control programmes are currently in effect:

- APEC Business Travel Card (ABTC): The APEC Business Travel Card, or ABTC, is an expedited border control programme for business travellers from APEC economies (excluding Canada and America). It provides visa exemptions and access to expedited border control facilities. ABTC holders are eligible for expedited border control at Canadian airports but not for any visa exemptions. ABTCs are generally issued only to citizens of APEC member countries; however, Hong Kong issues them to Permanent Residents who are not Chinese citizens, a category primarily consisting of British, Indian, and Pakistani citizens. The use of ABTCs in China is restricted due to the One Country, Two Systems and One China policies. Chinese nationals from Hong Kong, Macau, and the Republic of China are required to use special internal travel documents to enter the mainland. Similar restrictions apply to the use of ABTC by Chinese citizens from other regions entering areas administered by the Republic of China. (see: Internal border controls).
- Australia: SmartGates located at major Australian airports, allowing Australian ePassport holders and ePassport holders of several other countries to clear immigration controls more rapidly, and to enhance travel security by performing passport control checks electronically. SmartGate uses facial recognition system to verify the traveller's identity against the data stored in the chip in their biometric passport, as well as checking against immigration databases. Travellers require a biometric passport to use SmartGate as it uses information from the passport (such as photograph, name and date of birth) and in the respective countries' databases (i.e. banned travellers database) to decide whether to grant entry or departure from Australia or to generate a referral to a customs agent. These checks would otherwise require manual processing by a human, which is time-consuming, costly, and potentially error-prone.
- (Republic of Ireland) UK and Ireland: ePassport gates in the UK and Ireland are operated by the UK Border Force and the Irish Naturalisation and Immigration Service, and are located at immigration checkpoints in the arrival halls of some airports across both countries, offering an alternative to using desks staffed by immigration officers. The gates use a facial recognition system to verify the user's identity by comparing their facial features to those recorded in the photograph stored on the chip of their biometric passport. British citizens, European Economic Area citizens and citizens of Australia, Canada, Japan, New Zealand, Singapore, South Korea, Taiwan and the United States as well as Chinese citizens of Hong Kong who are enrolled in the Registered Traveller Service, can use ePassport gates at 14 ports of entry in the United Kingdom (Note: Birmingham Airport; Bristol Airport; Cardiff Airport; East Midlands Airport; Edinburgh Airport; Eurostar St Pancras Terminal; Eurostar Brussels-Zuid Terminal; Gatwick Airport (North and South Terminals); Glasgow Airport; Heathrow Airport (Terminals 2, 3, 4, and 5); London City Airport; Luton Airport; Manchester Airport (Terminals 1, 2, and 3); Stansted Airport) provided that they are aged either 18 and over or 12 and over, travelling with an adult and holding valid biometric passports. In Ireland, eGates are available at Dublin Airport for arrivals at Terminal 1 (Piers 1 and 2) and Terminal 2 and, in addition to Irish and British citizens, they are currently available to citizens of Switzerland and the European Economic Area with electronic passports aged 18 or over though there are proposals to extend the service to non-European citizens. Irish passport cards can be used at eGates in Dublin Airport.
- Caribbean Community: CARIPASS is a voluntary travel card programme that will provide secure and simple border crossings for citizens and legal residents of participating (Note: The following CARICOM jurisdictions are participating in the programme: Antigua and Barbuda; Barbados; Dominica; Grenada; Guyana; Jamaica; St. Kitts and Nevis; Saint Lucia; St. Vincent and the Grenadines; Trinidad and Tobago) Caribbean Community jurisdictions. The CARIPASS initiative is coordinated by the Implementation Agency for Crime and Security (CARICOM IMPACS), and seeks to provide standardised border control facilities within participating Caribbean communities. CARIPASS is accepted as a valid travel document within and between participating member states and will allow cardholders to access automated gate facilities at immigration checkpoints that will use biometric technology to verify the user.
- China:
  - Mainland China: Residents in the PRC, both Chinese citizens and foreign residents (not tourists), can use the Chinese E-Channel after registration, which is done at the border, before leaving the Mainland. Chinese citizens with Hong Kong or Macau Permanent Residence can use their Home Return Permit instead of their passport to enter and leave the Mainland.
  - Hong Kong & Macau: The Automated Passenger Clearance System (Chinese: 自助出入境檢查閘機), colloquially known as the e-Channel) is an automated border control facility available at airports in Hong Kong and Macau, and at land borders between the mainland and the Special Administrative Regions. It is open to residents in the appropriate regions, and to selected foreign nationals. (Note: Holders of the following foreign passports are eligible: Australian passport; German passport; Republic of Korea passport; Singapore passport; Thai passport) In Hong Kong, the eChannel is also available to non-residents on departure, without registration, and to registered non-residents who qualify as "frequent travellers", including Chinese citizens from the Mainland, for both arrival and departure. Finally, Hong Kong's and Macau's eChannel systems recognise each other's Permanent Resident ID card, after registration in an automated kiosk at the ferry terminal.
- Japan: Along with the introduction of J-BIS, an "Automated gate" (Japanese: 自動化ゲート) was set up at Terminal 1 and 2 at Narita Airport, Haneda Airport, Chubu Centrair Airport and Kansai Airport. With this system, when a person enters or leaves the country, rather than having to be processed by an examiner there, a person can use a machine at the gate, thereby making both entry and departure simpler and easier, as well as more convenient. Japanese people with valid passports, foreigners with both valid passports (this includes refugees with valid travel certificates and re-entry permits) and re-entry permits can use this system.
- Mexico: Viajero Confiable is a Mexican trusted traveller programme which allows members to pass securely through customs and immigration controls in reduced time, using automated kiosks at participating airports. Viajero Confiable was introduced in three airports in 2014 and has since expanded to additional sites. Like the NEXUS, Global Entry, and TSA PreCheck programs, Viajero Confiable members travelling through participating airports may use designated lanes to clear customs quickly and securely, as the Mexican government has already conducted a background check on them and they are considered trusted travellers. At the participating airports, members may use automated kiosks to scan their passport and fingerprints, and complete an electronic immigration form. The programme is targeted at Mexican citizens, as well as U.S. or Canadian citizens who are members of the Global Entry or NEXUS programme and are lawful permanent residents of Mexico.
- New Zealand: In New Zealand, a SmartGate system exists at Auckland, Wellington, Christchurch and Queenstown airports, enabling holders of biometric passports issued by New Zealand, Australia, Canada, China, France, Germany, Ireland, the Netherlands, the United Kingdom, and the United States to clear border controls using automated facilities. The system can currently only be used by travellers 12 years of age or older; however, a trial is underway that may lower the age of eligibility to use eGate for people with an eligible ePassport from 12 to 10 years of age. New Zealand eGates utilise biometric technology, comparing the photo of your face in your ePassport with the photo taken of you at the gate to confirm your identity. To ensure eGate can do this, travellers must look as similar to their ePassport photos as possible and remove any glasses, scarves, or hats they were not wearing when their passport photo was taken. eGate can handle minor changes in your face, for example, if the traveller's weight or hair has changed. Customs, Biosecurity, and Immigration officials utilise information provided at eGates, including photos, to clear travellers and their items across New Zealand's border. Biometric information is kept for three months before destruction. Still, other information, including about movements across New Zealand's border, is kept indefinitely and handled in accordance with the Privacy Act 1993, or as the law authorises. This might include information being used by or shared with other law enforcement or border control authorities. Since 1 July 2019, visitors from the 60 Visa Waiver countries require a New Zealand electronic Travel Authority (NZeTA). This is an online application, and additional toolkits and requirements for airlines and travel agents can be downloaded from the New Zealand Immigration website.
- Singapore: The enhanced-Immigration Automated Clearance System (eIACS) is available at all checkpoints for Singapore citizens, permanent residents, foreign residents with long-term passes, APEC Business Travel Card holders, and other registered travellers. Foreign visitors whose fingerprints are registered on arrival may use the eIACS lanes for exit clearance. In addition, the Biometric Identification of Motorbikers (BIKES) System is available for eligible motorcyclists at the land border crossings with Malaysia. Meanwhile, all visitors who have been fingerprinted on entry at a manned counter can use the eIACS to leave Singapore by air. Additionally, nationals of certain countries (Note: Australian passport; Hong Kong Special Administrative Region passport; Japan passport; Malaysia passport; New Zealand passport; People's Republic of China passport; Republic of Korea passport; Thailand passport; United Kingdom passport; United States passport) may register to use the eIACS system on entry, provided they meet prescribed conditions.
- South Korea: South Korea maintains a programme known as the Smart Entry Service, open for registration by South Koreans aged 7 or above and by registered foreigners (Note: Foreign passport holders eligible to register include: Hong Kong Special Administrative Region passport; Macao Special Administrative Region passport; Singapore passport; Republic of China passport; United States passport) aged 17 or above. Furthermore, visitors aged 17 or older may use the Smart Entry Service on exit at international airports, as long as they have provided their biometrics on arrival.
- Taiwan: An automated entry system, eGate, exists in areas administered by the Republic of China, providing expedited border control for ROC nationals as well as certain classes of residents and frequent visitors. Users scan their travel documents at the gate and are passed through for facial recognition. As of 2019, there have been instances of foreign non-registered travellers allowed to use the e-Gate system to depart, notably at Taipei Taoyuan Airport Terminal 1, but not Terminal 2, using a passport scan and fingerprints.
- Thailand: The automated passport control (APC) system, which uses a facial recognition system, has been available for Thai nationals since 2012, and more than 20 million have used it. Suvarnabhumi Airport opened 8 automated immigration lanes for foreigners, but initially only Singaporeans were allowed to use the system. Since then, Singaporeans and holders of the Hong Kong SAR passport have been allowed to use the system. Once processed, the foreign travellers can leave the automatic channel and present their passport to a Thai immigration officer to be stamped.
- North America: North America has a wide variety of expedited border control programs:
  - (United States) Global Entry: Global Entry is a programme for frequent travellers that enables them to utilise automated border control facilities and priority security screening. In addition to U.S. citizens and Permanent Residents, the programme is open to Indian, Singaporean, and South Korean citizens among others. Global Entry members are eligible to use automated Global Entry facilities at certain airports to clear border control more efficiently. Enrolled users must present their machine-readable passport or permanent residency card, and submit their fingerprints to establish identity. Users then complete an electronic customs declaration, and are issued a receipt instructing them to either proceed to baggage claim, or to a normal inspection booth for an interview. Participants may utilize automated kiosks to clear U.S. border controls at participating airports. (Note: The following airports are equipped with automated kiosks (except where otherwise stated, all participating airports are located in United States or its territories): Abu Dhabi International Airport (AUH)‡; Anchorage – Ted Stevens Anchorage International Airport (ANC); Atlanta – Hartsfield-Jackson Atlanta International Airport (ATL); Austin-Bergstrom International Airport (AUS); Baltimore/Washington International Thurgood Marshall Airport (BWI); Boston – Logan International Airport (BOS); Burlington International Airport (BTV)‡; Calgary International Airport (YYC); Charlotte-Douglas International Airport (CLT); Chicago Midway International Airport (MDW)‡; Chicago O'Hare International Airport (ORD); Cincinnati/Northern Kentucky International Airport (CVG); Cleveland Hopkins International Airport (CLE); Dallas/Fort Worth International Airport (DFW); Daniel K. Inouye International Airport (HNL); Denver International Airport (DEN); Detroit Metropolitan Airport (DTW); Dublin Airport (DUB)‡; Edmonton International Airport (YEG); Fairbanks International Airport (FAI); Fort Lauderdale/Hollywood International Airport (FLL); Guam International Airport (GUM); Halifax Stanfield International Airport (YHZ); Houston George Bush Intercontinental Airport (IAH); John F. Kennedy International Airport, New York City (JFK); John Wayne Airport (SNA)‡; Lambert-St. Louis International Airport (STL); Los Angeles International Airport (LAX); Luis Muñoz Marín International Airport (SJU); Lynden Pindling International Airport, Bahamas (NAS)‡; McCarran International Airport, Las Vegas (LAS); Miami International Airport (MIA); Milwaukee Mitchell International Airport, Milwaukee (MKE); Minneapolis/St. Paul International Airport (MSP); Montréal–Pierre Elliott Trudeau International Airport (YUL); Newark Liberty International Airport (EWR); Oakland International Airport (OAK)‡; Orlando International Airport (MCO); Orlando-Sanford International Airport (SFB); Ottawa Macdonald–Cartier International Airport (YOW); Philadelphia International Airport (PHL); Phoenix Sky Harbor International Airport (PHX); Pittsburgh International Airport (PIT); Portland International Airport (PDX); Queen Beatrix International Airport, Aruba (AUA)‡; Raleigh-Durham International Airport (RDU)‡; Saipan International Airport (SPN)‡; Salt Lake City International Airport (SLC); San Antonio International Airport (SAT); San Diego International Airport (SAN); San Francisco International Airport (SFO); San Jose International Airport (SJC)‡; Seattle-Tacoma International Airport – SeaTac (SEA); Shannon Airport (SNN)‡; Tampa International Airport (TPA); Toronto Pearson International Airport (YYZ); Vancouver International Airport (YVR); Washington-Dulles International Airport (IAD); Winnipeg James Armstrong Richardson International Airport (YWG); The ‡ indicates there are no Global Entry enrollment centres at these sites. Enrolment centres in Canada are NEXUS enrolment centres staffed by U.S. and Canadian border control officers)
  - CANPASS: Canadian citizens and Permanent Residents can apply for CANPASS, which, in its present form, provides expedited border controls for individuals entering Canada on corporate and private aircraft.
  - (United States) NEXUS and FAST: NEXUS is a joint Canadian-U.S. expedited border control programme for low-risk travellers holding Canadian or U.S. citizenship or permanent residence. Membership requires approval by Canadian and U.S. authorities and entitles members to dedicated RFID-enabled lanes when crossing the land border. A NEXUS card can also be utilised as a travel document between the two countries and entitles passengers to priority border control facilities in Canada and Global Entry facilities in the U.S. Free and Secure Trade (FAST) is a similar programme for commercial drivers and approved importers, reducing the amount of customs checks conducted at the border and expediting the border control process. When entering the U.S. by air, holders of NEXUS cards may use Global Entry kiosks to clear border controls at participating airports
  - SENTRI: SENTRI is a programme similar to NEXUS for U.S. and Mexican citizens that also allows members to register their cars for expedited land-border controls. Unlike NEXUS, SENTRI is administered solely by the American government and does not provide expedited controls when entering Mexico. When entering the United States by land from Canada, a NEXUS card can be used, but not the other way around. Individuals holding a NEXUS card may additionally register their cars for expedited land border controls under SENTRI. When entering the United States by air, holders of SENTRI cards may use Global Entry kiosks to clear border controls at participating airports

=== Local border traffic ===
Local border traffic is the flow of travellers residing within the area surrounding a controlled international or internal border. In many cases, local border traffic is subject to special regulations to expedite it. Depending on the particular border in question, these measures may be restricted to residents, implemented as a blanket regional visa waiver by one jurisdiction for nationals of the other, restricted to frequent cross-border travellers, or available to individuals lawfully present in one jurisdiction seeking to visit the other.

(European Union) Schengen Area: Schengen states which share an external land border with a non-Schengen state are authorised by EU Regulation 1931/2006 to conclude bilateral agreements with neighbouring countries implementing a simplified local border traffic regime. Such agreements define a border area and provide for the issuance of local border traffic permits to residents of the border area that may be used to cross the EU external border within the border area.

=== Relaxed control in near-border areas ===
- Bhutan: For example, the relaxed border controls maintained by Bhutan for those not proceeding past Phuentsholing and certain other border cities enable travellers to enter without going through any document check whatsoever.
- America: The Border Crossing Card issued by American authorities to Mexican nationals enables Mexicans to enter border areas without a passport. (Note: As a standalone document, the BCC allows Mexican citizens to visit border areas in the U.S. when entering by land or sea directly from Mexico for less than 72 hours. The document also functions as a full B1/B2 visa when presented with a valid Mexican passport.) Both United States and Bhutan maintain interior checkposts to enforce compliance.
- China: China maintains relaxed border controls for individuals lawfully in Hong Kong or Macau to visit the surrounding Pearl River Delta visa-free provided that certain conditions are met. (Note: The visitor is a national of a country which has diplomatic relations with the People's Republic of China; The visitor is visiting the Pearl River Delta as part of a tour group organised by a Hong Kong or Macau-based travel agency; The stay is for six days or less; The visitor stays only within the cities of Guangzhou, Shenzhen, Zhuhai, Foshan, Dongguan, Zhongshan, Jiangmen, Zhaoqing, Huizhou and Shantou.)
- Belarus The "Brest – Grodno" visa-free territory, established by a presidential decree signed in August 2019, has permitted local visa-free access to most visitors lawfully present in the neighbouring Schengen Area since 10 November 2019. Visitors are allowed to stay without a visa for 15 days. Entry is possible through designated checkpoints with Poland and Lithuania, (Note: Brest (Terespol); Bruzgi (Kuźnica); Damačava (Sławatycze); Bieniakoni (Šalčininkai); Bierastavica (Bobrowniki); Piasčatka (Połowce); Pryvalka (Raigardas); Piareraŭ (Białowieża); Liasnaja (Rudawka); Pryvalka (Švendubrė)) Brest-Uschodni Railway Station, Grodno Railway Station, Brest Airport and Grodno Airport. Before travel, visitors must obtain authorisation from a local travel agency in Belarus.
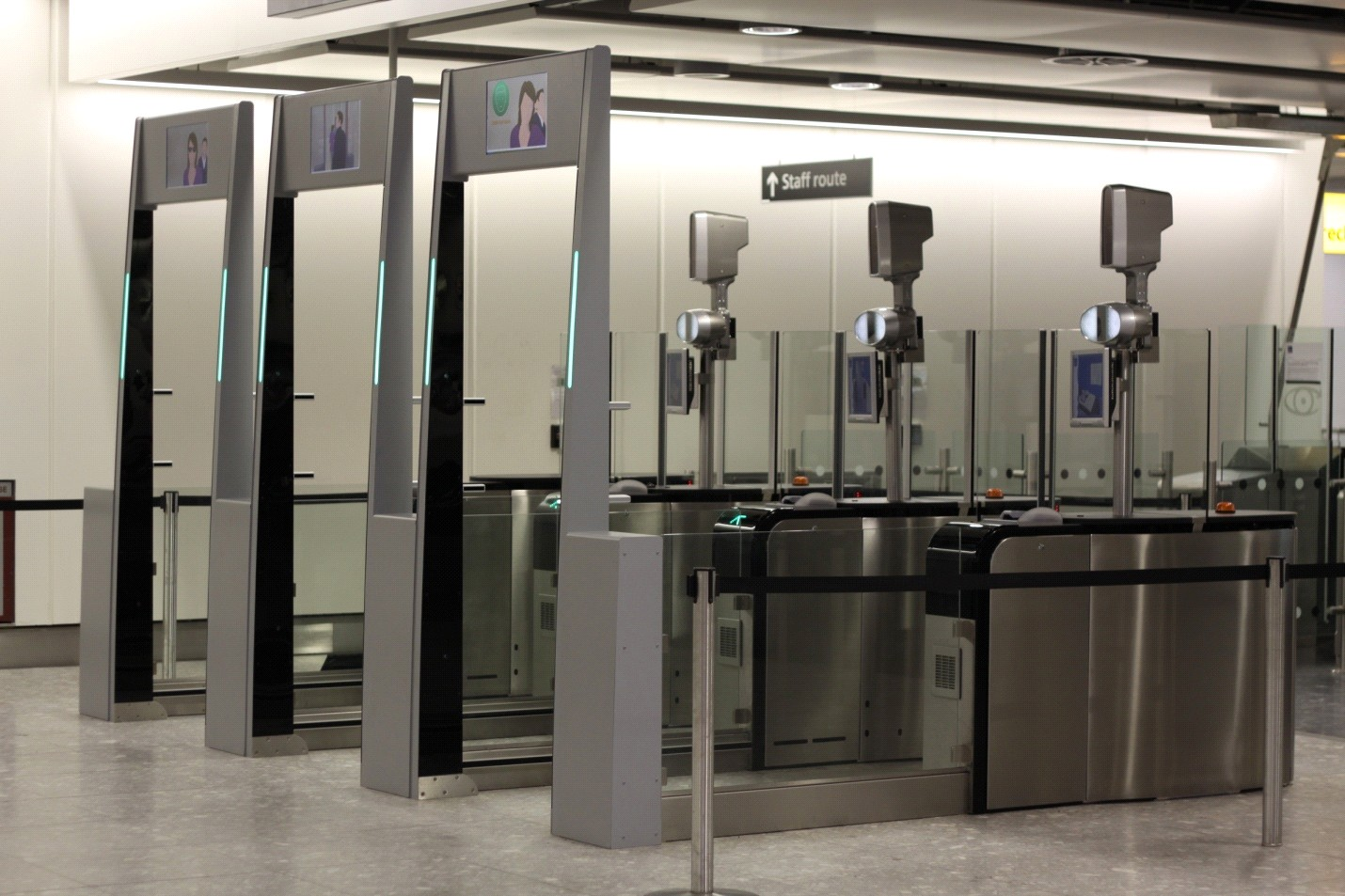
ePassport gates in Heathrow Airport (Terminal 4)

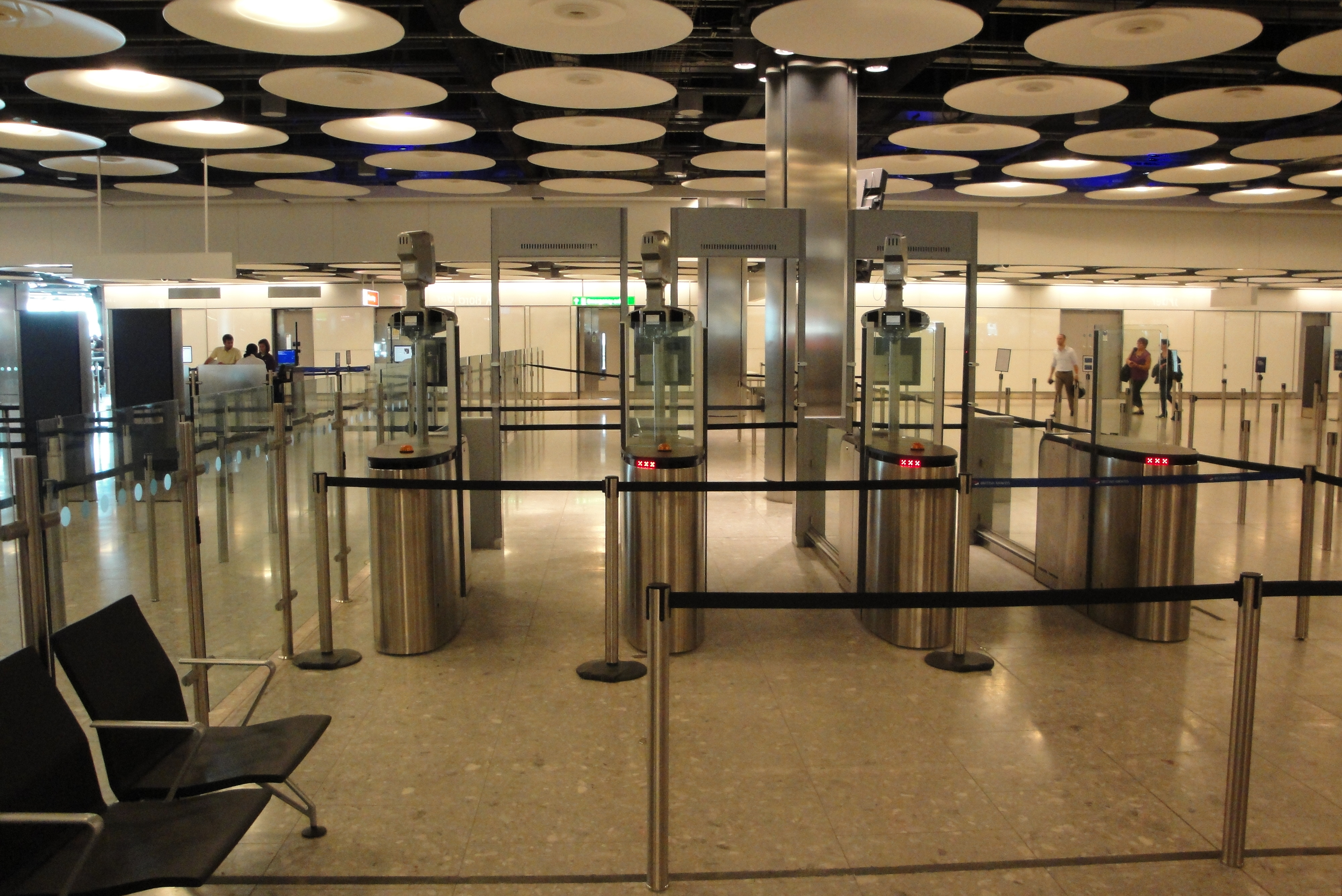
ePassport gates in Heathrow Airport (Terminal 5)

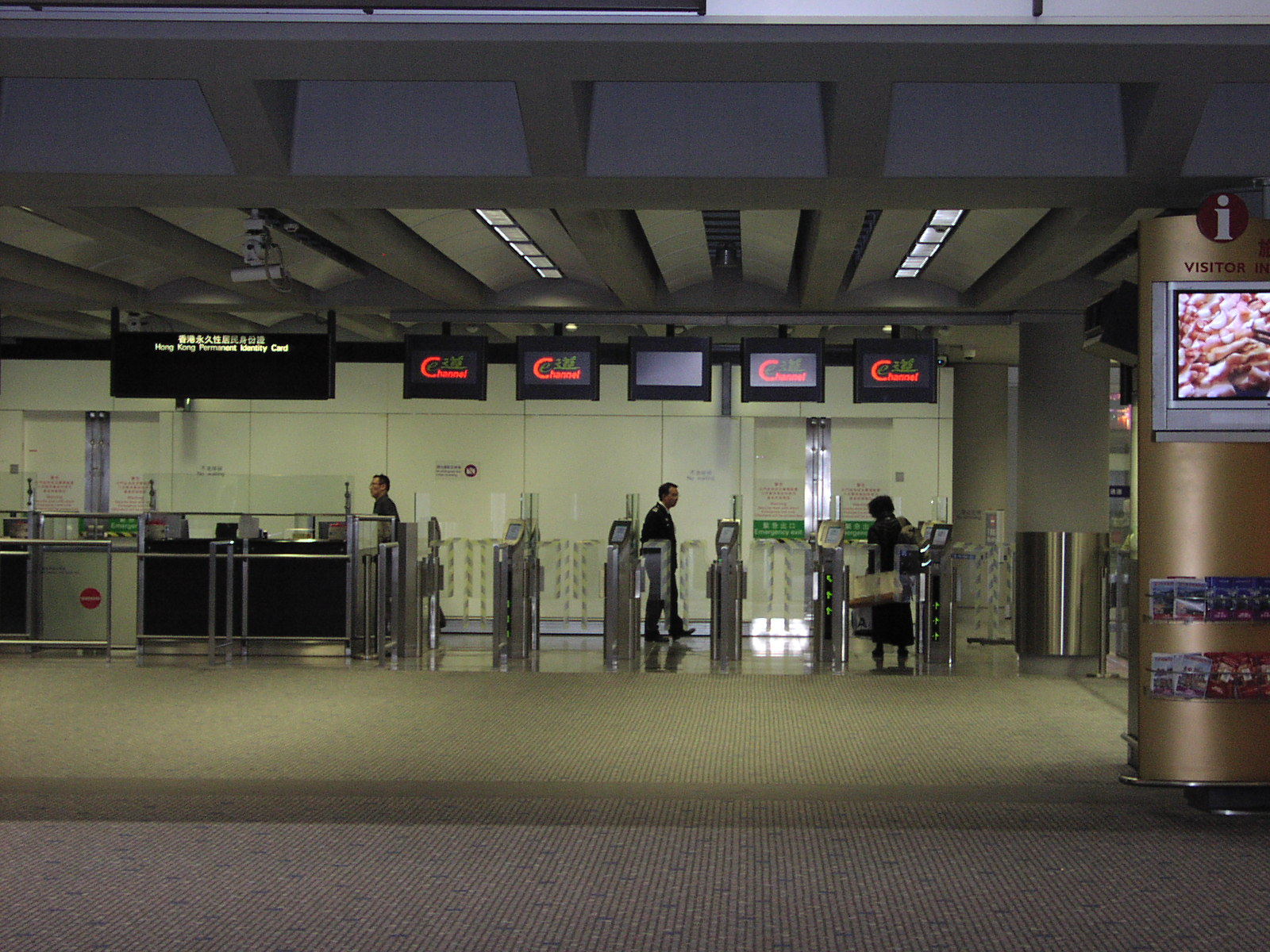
e-Channel machines at Hong Kong International Airport

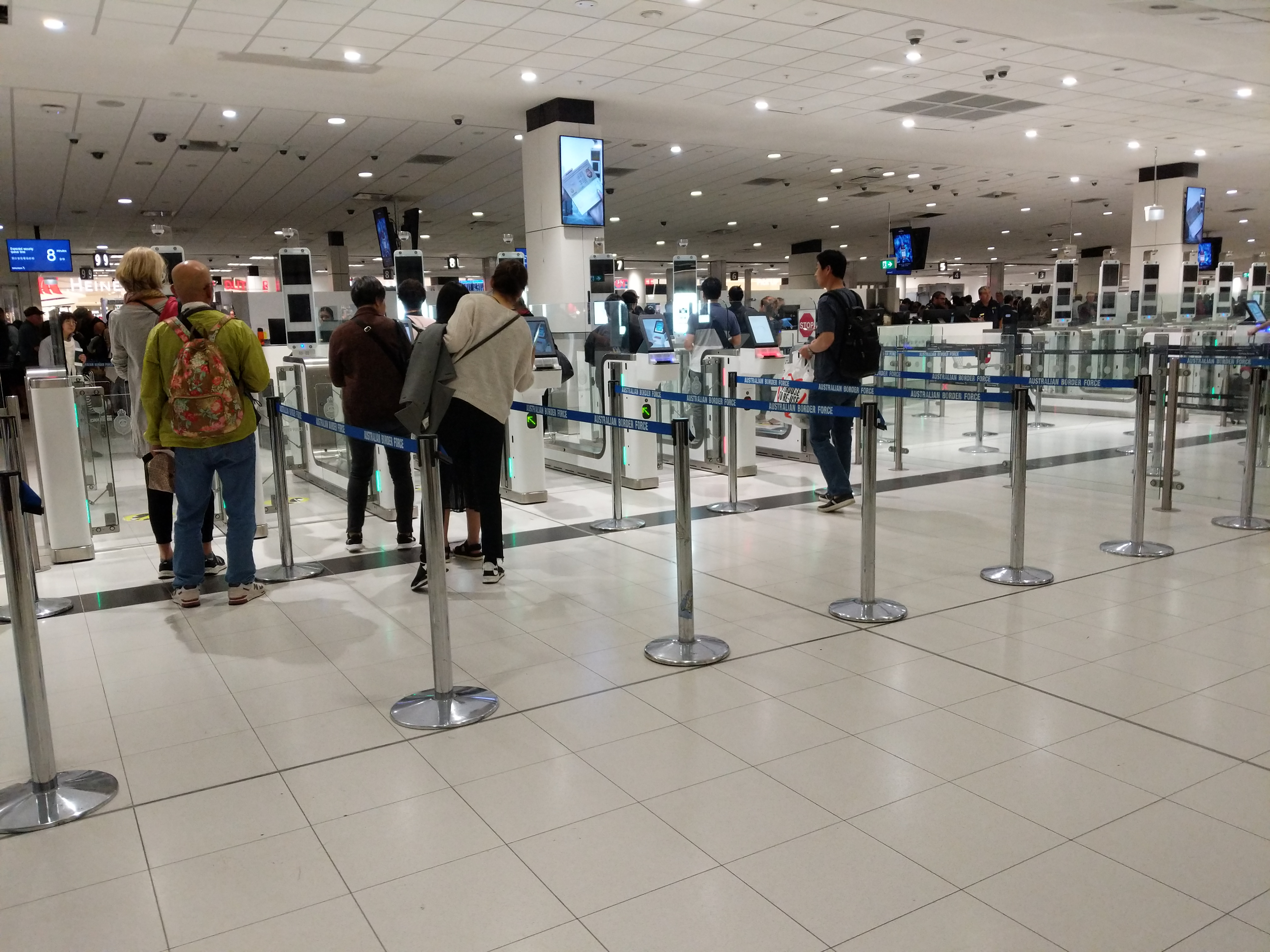
Smartgate Departures at Sydney Airport

Automated immigration at Narita Airport

Countries whose citizens are eligible for Global Entry

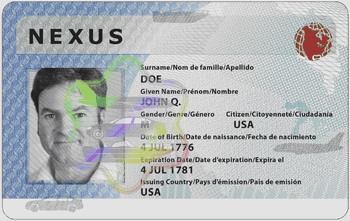
Sample NEXUS card

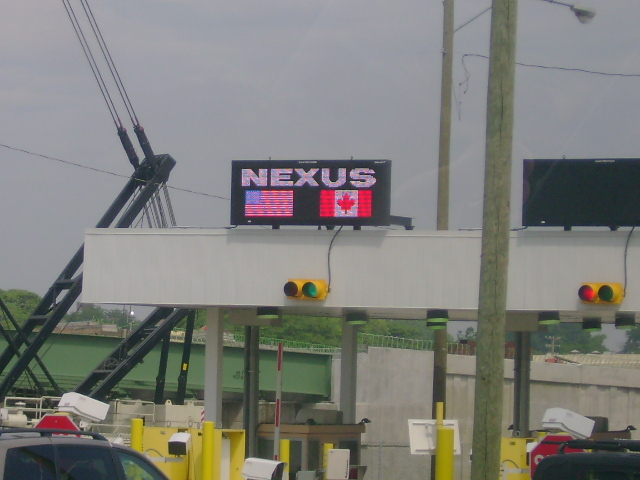
A NEXUS lane at the American side of the Ambassador Bridge

Full members of the scheme
Transitional members (America and Canada)

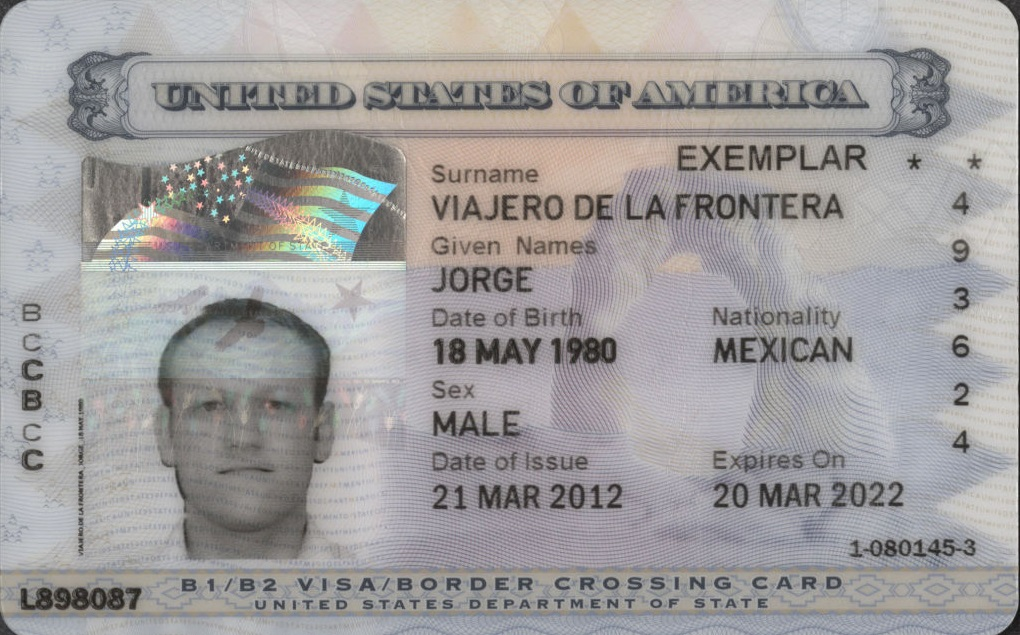
The front of the updated version of the Border Crossing Card issued to Mexican nationals

== Border control organisations by country ==
Border control is generally the responsibility of specialised government organisations which oversee various aspects of their jurisdiction's border control policies, including customs, immigration policy, border guard, biosecurity measures. Official designations, division of responsibilities, and command structures of these organisations vary considerably, and some countries split border control functions across multiple agencies.

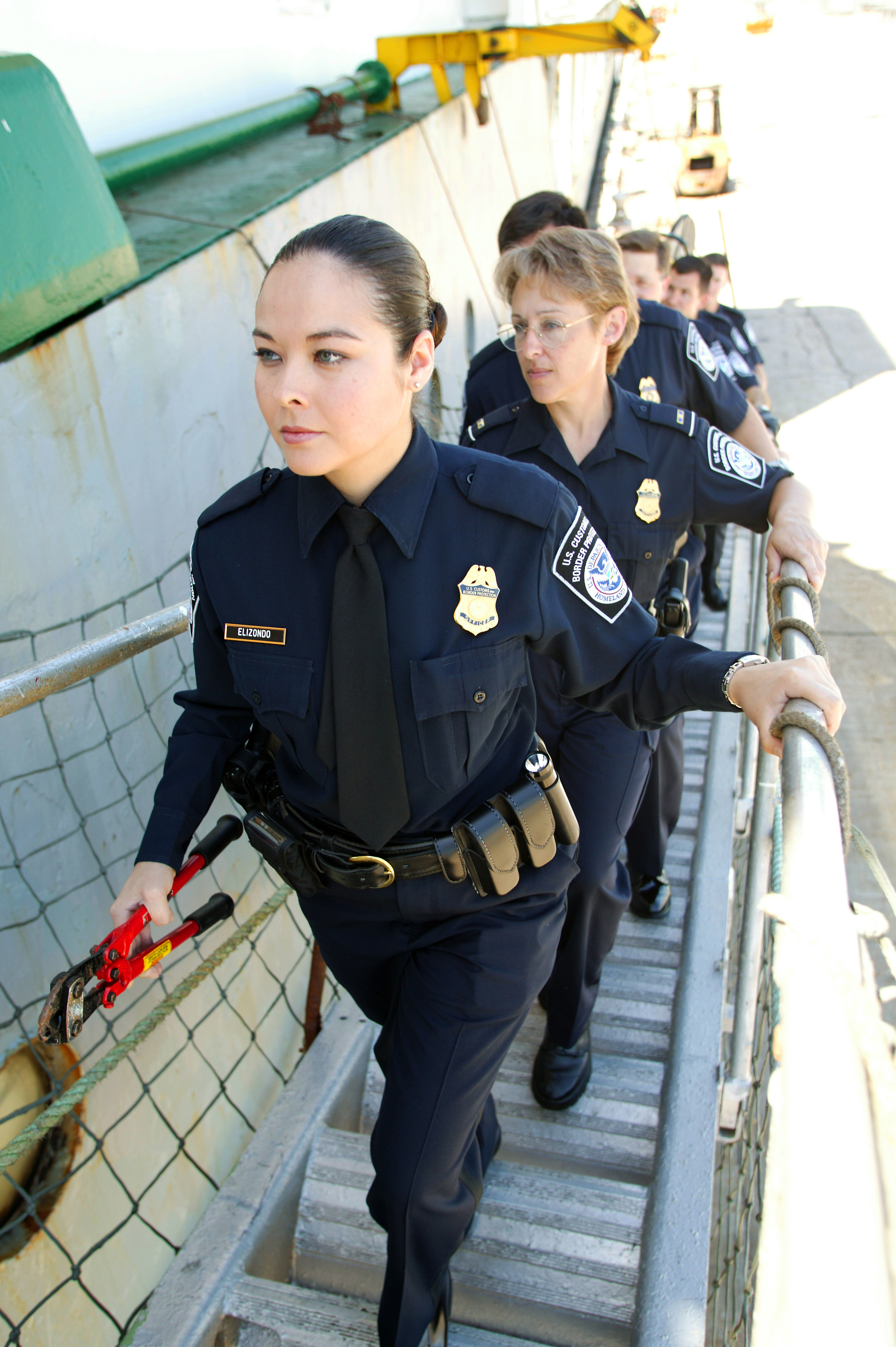
US customs and border officers boarding a ship at the border

- Australia
  - Australian Border Force
- Brunei
  - Department of Immigration and National Registration
  - Royal Customs and Excise Department
- Canada
  - Immigration, Refugees and Citizenship Canada
  - Canada Border Services Agency (previously Canada Customs and Revenue Agency)
  - Canadian Air Transport Security Authority
- China
  - National Immigration Administration of Ministry of Public Security
  - People's Armed Police
  - General Administration of Customs
  - Immigration Department (Hong Kong)
  - Hong Kong Customs and Excise Department
  - Public Security Police Force of Macau
  - Macau Customs Service
- India
  - Border Security Force
  - The Assam Rifles
  - Indo-Tibetan Border Police
- Indonesia
  - Directorate General of Immigration (Indonesia)
  - Directorate General of Customs and Excise
- Ireland
  - Irish Naturalisation and Immigration Service
  - Garda National Immigration Bureau
  - Revenue Commissioners
- Iran
  - The Immigration & Passport Police Office, a subdivision of Law Enforcement Force of Islamic Republic of Iran
  - Islamic Republic of Iran Border Guard Command ("NAJA Border Guard"), a subdivision of Law Enforcement Force of Islamic Republic of Iran
- Malaysia
  - Immigration Department of Malaysia
  - Royal Malaysian Customs Department
- North Korea
  - Border Security Command
  - Coastal Security Bureau
- Pakistan
  - Pakistan Rangers
  - Frontier Corps
  - Gilgit−Baltistan Scouts
  - Pakistan Army
  - Pakistan Rangers
  - Pakistan Customs
- Philippines
  - Bureau of Customs
  - Bureau of Immigration
- Schengen Area
  - European Border and Coast Guard Agency (Frontex)
  - France
    - Direction centrale de la police aux frontières (a directorate of the French National Police)
    - Direction générale des douanes et droits indirects (DGDDI)
  - Finland
    - Finnish Border Guard
    - Finnish Customs
  - Germany
    - Federal Police
    - Bundeszollverwaltung
  - Italy
    - Polizia di Stato
    - Guardia di Finanza
    - Arma dei Carabinieri
  - Netherlands
    - Koninklijke Marechaussee (English: Royal Military Constabulary), a branch of the Dutch Armed Forces
    - Fiscal Information and Investigation Service
- New Zealand
  - New Zealand Immigration
  - New Zealand Customs Service
  - Norway
    - Norwegian Police Service
    - Norwegian Customs Service
    - Ranger Battalion GSV (only between Norway and Russia)
  - Spain
    - Cuerpo Nacional de Policía
    - Guardia Civil
    - Customs Surveillance Service
  - Switzerland
    - Federal Department of Justice and Police
      - Federal Office of Police
    - Federal Department of Finance
      - Swiss Border Guard
  - Sweden
    - Swedish Border Police
- South Korea
  - Korean Immigration Service, Ministry of Justice
  - Korea Customs Service
- Singapore
  - Immigration and Checkpoints Authority
  - Singapore Customs
- Taiwan
  - National Immigration Agency
  - Customs Administration
- Thailand
  - Thai Immigration Department
  - Thai Customs
- United Kingdom
  - HM Revenue and Customs
  - UK Border Force
  - Immigration Enforcement
- United States
  - Department of Homeland Security (DHS)
  - U.S. Customs and Border Protection (CBP), a division of the DHS
  - United States Border Patrol
  - Transportation Security Administration
  - U.S. Immigration and Customs Enforcement, or ICE
  - United States Citizenship and Immigration Services
- Vietnam
  - Vietnam Immigration Department
  - Vietnam Customs
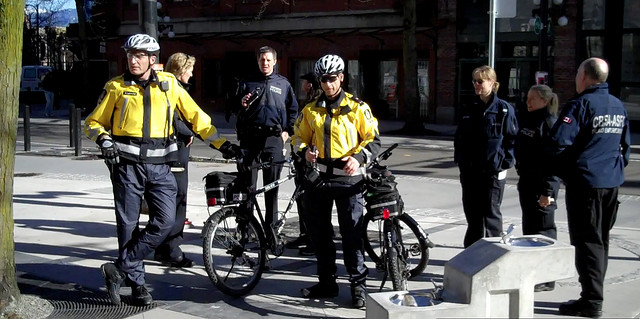
Canadian Border Security Agency officers and police in Vancouver

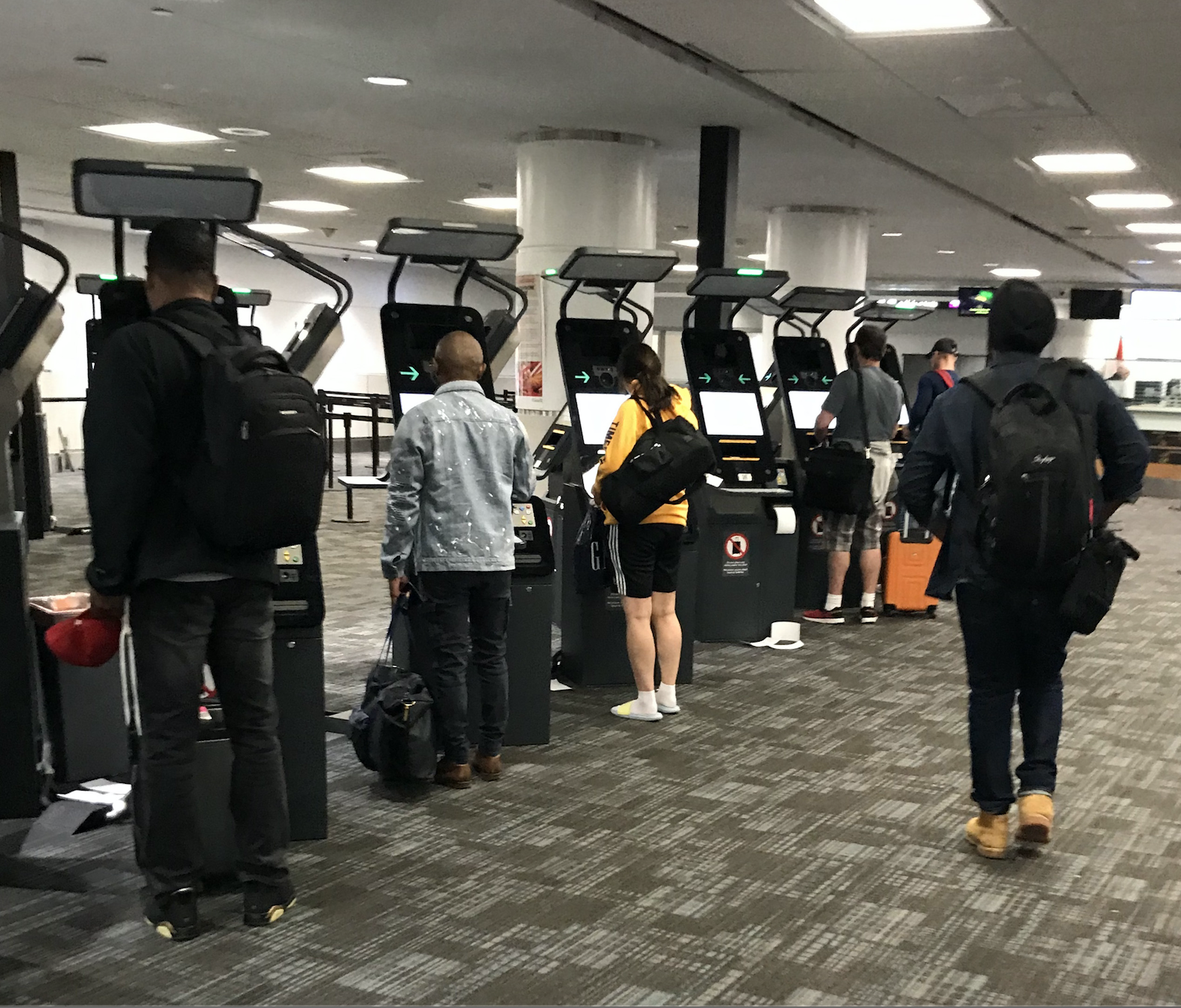
Automated passport control kiosks at Toronto Pearson International Airport

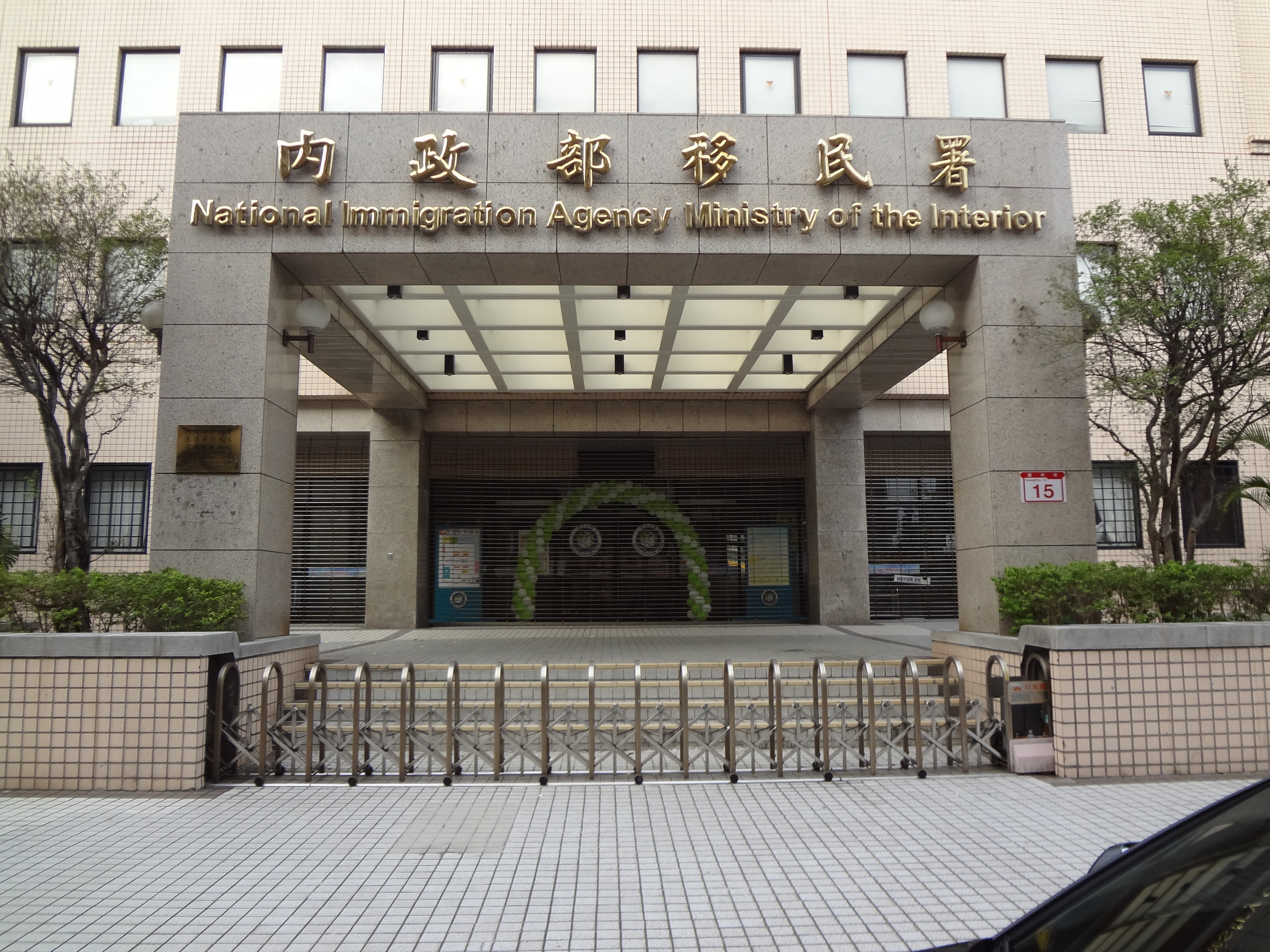
National Immigration Agency headquarters in Taipei

Insignia of the Indian Border Security Force

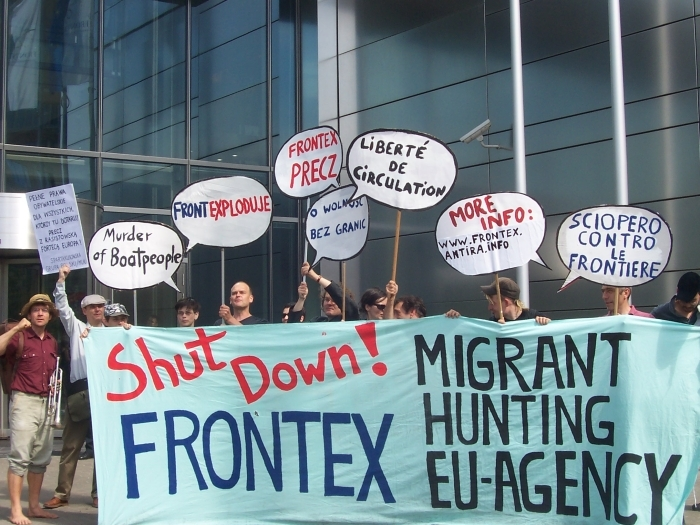
Protests against Frontex in Warsaw in 2008

Emblem of the Department of Homeland Security, the umbrella agency responsible for border control in the United States

== Controversies by country ==
Certain border control policies of various countries have been the subject of controversy and public debate. Public opinion on border control and closing borders varies by country.

- Australia:
  - Offshore detention centres: Beginning in 2001, Australia implemented border control policies featuring the detention of asylum seekers and economic migrants who arrived unlawfully by boat in nearby islands in the Pacific. These policies are controversial, and in 2017, the Supreme Court of Papua New Guinea declared the detention centre at the Manus Island unconstitutional. The adherence of these policies to international human rights law is a matter of controversy.
  - Travel restrictions on Australian citizens during the COVID-19 pandemic: During the COVID-19 pandemic, Australia adopted a policy of denying entry to its own citizens arriving from jurisdictions perceived to pose a high risk of COVID-19 transmission. Additionally, Australia adopted a broad policy of restricting entry to the country for all individuals located overseas, including Australian citizens, resulting in a large number of Australian citizens stranded abroad. Australia's policies concerning its own citizens undermined the principle in international law that a state must permit entry to its own citizens, as enshrined in the International Covenant on Civil and Political Rights. At the same time, the Australian government prohibited most Australian citizens from leaving the country, even if they ordinarily reside overseas.

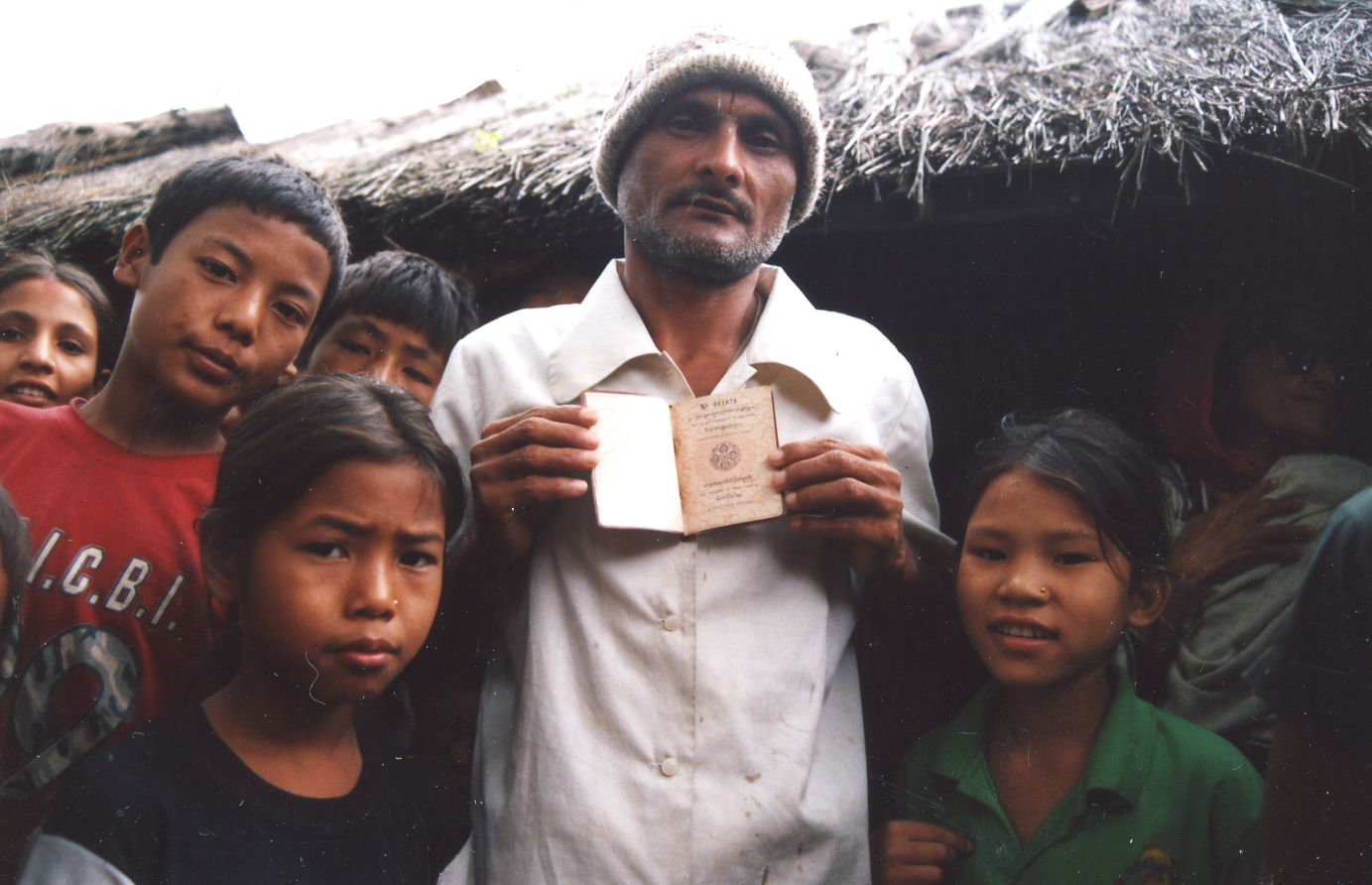
Lhotshampa refugees in Beldangi camp in Nepal; the man is holding a Bhutanese passport

- Bhutan: Starting primarily in the 1990s, the Bhutanese government implemented strict restrictions on the country's ethnically Nepali Lhotshampa population and implemented internal border control policies to restrict immigration or return of ethnic Nepalis, creating a refugee crisis. This policy shift effectively ended previously liberal immigration policies concerning Nepalis and counts among the most racialised border control policies in Asia.
- China: China does not currently recognise North Korean defectors as refugees and subjects them to immediate deportation if caught. The China-DPRK border is fortified, and both sides aim to deter refugees from crossing. Human rights organisations have criticised this aspect of Chinese border control policy.
- Cyprus: As a result of Northern Cyprus's sovereignty dispute with Southern Cyprus, the South (a member of the European Union) has imposed restrictions on the North's airports, and pressure from the European Union has resulted in all countries other than Turkey recognising the South's ability to impose a border shutdown on the North, thus negating the right to self determination of the predominantly Turkish Northern Cypriot population and subjecting their airports to border controls imposed by the predominantly Greek South. As a result, Northern Cyprus is heavily dependent on Turkey for economic support and is unable to develop a functioning economy.
- Israel: Border control, both on entry and on exit, at Israeli airports rates passengers' potential threat to security using factors including nationality, ethnicity, and race. Instances of discrimination against Arabs, people perceived to be Muslim, and Russian Jews among others have been reported in the media. Security at Tel Aviv's Ben Gurion Airport relies on several fundamentals, including a heavy focus on what Raphael Ron, former director of security at Ben Gurion, terms the "human factor", which he generalised as "the inescapable fact that terrorist attacks are carried out by people who can be found and stopped by an effective security methodology." As part of its focus on this so-called "human factor", Israeli security officers interrogate travellers, profiling those who appear to be Arab based on name or physical appearance. Even as Israeli authorities argue that racist, ethnic, and religious profiling are effective security measures, according to Boaz Ganor, Israel has not undertaken any known empirical studies on the efficacy of the technique of racial profiling.

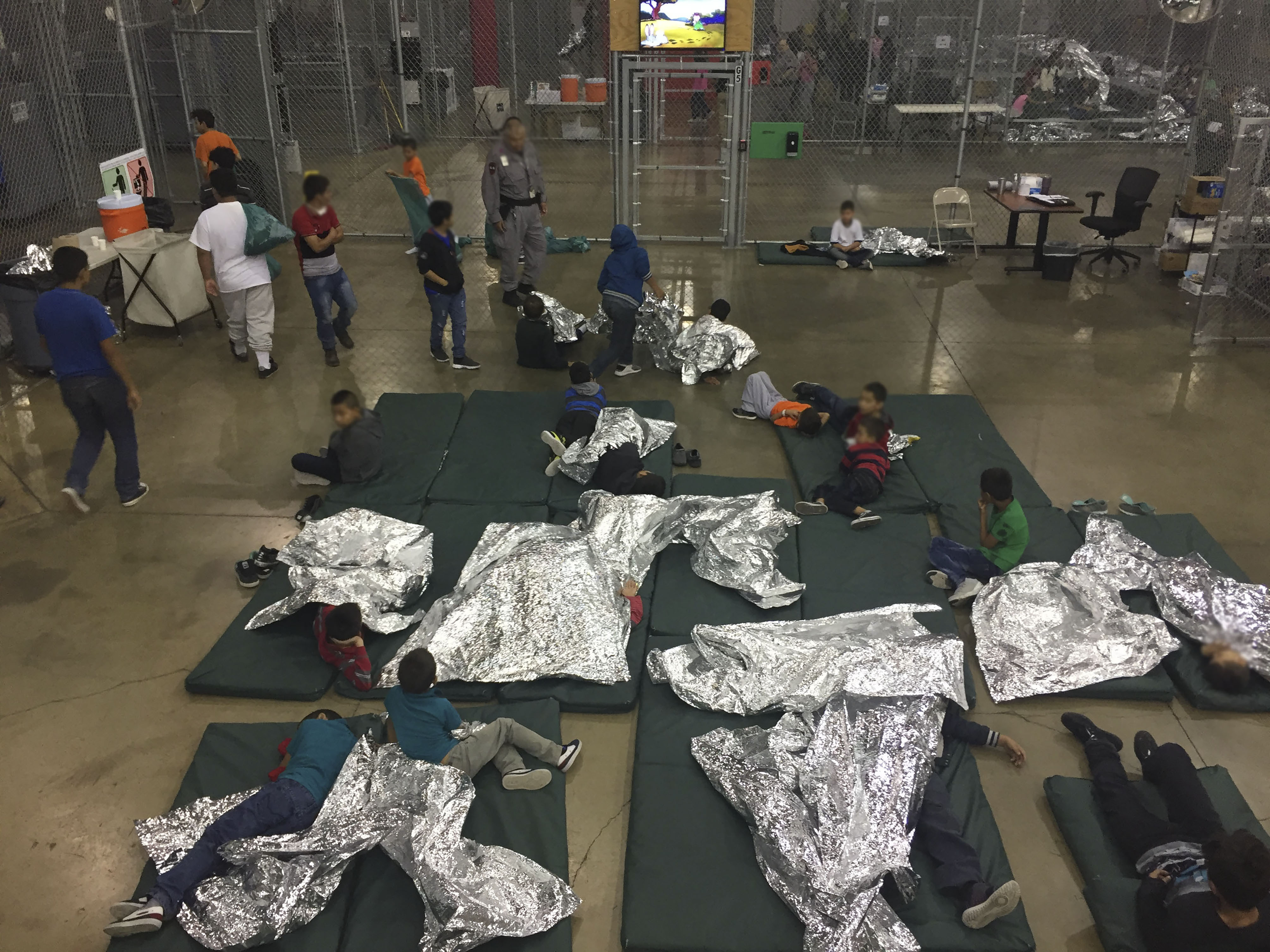
Children detained by the American government pictured in a wire-mesh cage (photo taken by United States Customs and Border Protection)

ProPublica recording of crying children separated from their families

- United States
  - Policies targeting Muslims: Since the implementation of added security measures in the aftermath of the 2001 World Trade Centre attacks, reports of discrimination against people perceived to be Muslim by American border security officers have been prevalent in the media. The travel restrictions implemented during the Trump presidency primarily against Muslim majority countries have provoked controversy over whether such measures are a legitimate Border security measure or unethically discriminatory.
  - Separation of families seeking asylum: In April 2018, as part of its "zero tolerance" policy, the American government ordered the separation of the children of refugees and asylum seekers from their parents. As a consequence of popular outrage, (Note: The policy proved extremely unpopular with the public, with approximately 25% of Americans supporting it, less than for any recent major piece of legislation. The detainment of children by the U.S. government has been compared to the Nazi concentration camps by some observers and politicians.) and criticism from the medical (Note: The policy has been condemned by the American Academy of Pediatrics, the American College of Physicians and the American Psychiatric Association. Together, they represent more than 250,000 doctors in the United States. Irwin Redlener, who co-founded Children's Health Fund, called the policy "dehumanising" and described it as a form of child abuse. Many concerned researchers and clinicians signed an open letter to Homeland Security Secretary Nielsen calling on her to end the migrant child separations, writing, "Decades of psychological and brain research have demonstrated that forced parental separation and placement in incarceration-like facilities can have profound immediate, long-term, and irreparable harm on infant and child development.") and religious (Note: The policy has been condemned or criticised by: The United States Conference of Catholic Bishops; The National Association of Evangelicals; The Greek Orthodox Archdiocese of America; Episcopal Church; United Methodist Church; African Methodist Episcopal Church; Presbyterian Church; Evangelical Lutheran Church; The Church of Jesus Christ of Latter-day Saints (LDS Church)) communities, the policy was put on hold by an executive order signed by Trump on 20 June 2018. Under the policy, federal authorities separated children from their parents, relatives, or other adults who accompanied them in crossing the border, whether apprehended during an illegal crossing or, in numerous reported cases, legally presenting themselves for asylum. The policy involved prosecuting all adults detained at the Mexican border, imprisoning parents, and handing minors to the American Department of Health and Human Services (Spanish: Departamento de Salud y Servicios Sociales de los Estados Unidos). The federal government reported that the policy resulted in the separation of over 2300 children from their parents. The Trump administration blamed Congress for the atrocity and labelled the change in policy as "the Democrats' law", even though Congress had been overwhelmingly dominated by Republicans since 2016. Regardless, members of both parties criticised the policy, and detractors of the Trump administration emphasise that there does not seem to be any written law requiring the government to implement such a policy. Attorney General Jeff Sessions, in defending the policy, quoted a passage from the Bible, even though religious doctrine carries absolutely no weight in American law. Other officials praised the policy as a deterrent to unlawful immigration. The costs of separating migrant children from their parents and keeping them in "tent cities" are higher than keeping them with their parents in detention centres. To handle the large amount of immigration charges brought by the Trump administration, federal prosecutors had to divert resources from other crime cases. It costs $775 per person per night to house the children when they are separated but $256 per person per night when they are held in permanent HHS facilities and $298 per person per night to keep the children with their parents in immigration detention centres. The head of the Justice Department's major crimes unit in San Diego diverted staff from drug smuggling cases. Drug smuggling cases were also increasingly pursued in state courts rather than federal courts, as federal prosecutors were increasingly preoccupied with pursuing charges against illegal border crossings. The Kaiser Family Foundation said that costs associated with the policy may also divert resources from programmes within the Department of Health and Human Services. In July 2018, it was reported that HHS had diverted at least $40 million from its health programs to care for and reunify migrant children, and that the HHS was preparing to shift more than $200 million from other HHS accounts.

== See also ==
- Air sovereignty
- Airspace
- Asylum seeker
- Border barrier
- Freedom of movement
- Maritime boundary
