= Externalization (migration) =

Efforts by countries to prevent migrants reaching their borders

Externalization (Note: Also known as "off-shoring of refugees", "non-entrée", "remote control", "non-arrival measures," "deterritorialized" control, "policing at a distance", "cordon sanitaire", a kind of proxy war, or "extraterritorial immigration control".) describes the efforts of wealthy, developed countries to prevent asylum seekers and other migrants from reaching their borders, often by enlisting third countries or private entities, including criminal groups. Externalization is used by Australia, Canada, the United States, the European Union and the United Kingdom. Although less visible than physical barriers at international borders, externalization controls or restricts mobility in ways that are out of sight and far from the country's border. Examples include visa restrictions, sanctions for carriers that transport asylum seekers, and agreements with source and transit countries. Consequences often include increased irregular migration, human smuggling, and border deaths.

== History ==
According to sociologist David Scott FitzGerald, "Measures to keep people from reaching sanctuary are as old as the asylum tradition itself." The main technologies of externalization were developed in the 1930s and 1940s in order to reduce the number of Jewish refugees arriving in the Americas and Mandatory Palestine. After World War II, many countries were ashamed of their failure to protect Jewish refugees, and adopted the norm of non-refoulement, which effectively prevented the rejection of refugees to countries where they would face persecution. Since 1994, the number of refugees resettled has consistently been below 1 percent of those eligible. Most refugees can only hope to receive asylum in a Global North country by physically traveling there and applying for asylum. FitzGerald argues that any territorial system of asylum creates an incentive to reduce the number of claimants through externalization. State practices of externalization by developed countries proliferated through the 1980s, 1990s, and 2000s.

== Motivation ==
FitzGerald argues that "keeping refugees at a distance is a public relations scheme to render them invisible so their plight can be ignored", and a strategy to evade legally binding human rights obligations. Externalization policies are often "specifically designed to avoid any direct jurisdictional links to the sponsoring State, at whose behest controls are carried out". According to legal scholar Ioannis Kalpouzos, the desire to avoid migration and legal accountability has "led to an increasingly sophisticated set of practices the aim of which is to avoid, outsource, and distance responsibility, accountability, and liability". According to one estimate, asylum claims in nineteen countries were reduced by 17 percent because of externalization. In some countries, externalization combined with geographical isolation can reduce unauthorized arrivals to nearly zero, but these policies are much less effective in Europe due to the long land border and proximity to Turkey and North Africa. Legal scholars Thomas Gammeltoft-Hansen and Nikolas Tan argue that deterring asylum seekers "is not sustainable in the long term, or even perhaps in the medium term" because of increasing financial costs, lack of effectiveness, and legal challenges.

== Effects ==
According to The Oxford Handbook of International Refugee Law, "Extraterritorial migration control represents a fundamental challenge to refugees’ ability to access asylum". FitzGerald describes the case of Alan Kurdi, a young Syrian refugee who drowned while trying to reach Europe, as a case of the externalization system "working as designed". Instead of the common term irregular, some sources use the term irregularized migration to indicate the outcome of state policies that prevent other forms of entry. Professor Thomas Spijkerboer argues that denial of access to the global mobility infrastructure has led to the emergence of a shadow mobility infrastructure. "If we take border deaths as a measure of the incidence of the reliance on this shadow mobility infrastructure, the conclusion would be that human smuggling has increased consistently with increased control over the access to the global mobility infrastructure." Several studies have found that "perhaps the key single determinant of smuggling at sea, and the deaths that result from dangerous transport, especially across the Mediterranean, is the closing down of legal options for air travel and entry to Europe" and visa restrictions.

FitzGerald states that "smugglers can be blamed for deaths and abuses rather than the government policies that leave refugees seeking safety with few choices"; a tactic used by governments since Jews were trying to escape from Europe during World War II. In the Mediterranean, expansion of externalization did not end irregular migration but simply redirected it to alternate routes and more dangerous pathways. The Australian researchers Antje Missbach and Melissa Phillips state that "the growing prevalence of irregular migration is a direct result of the imposition of restrictions on legal migration through barriers, walls, security, and surveillance measures and deterrents".

Empirical studies in several countries have found that anti-migration policies increase the number of people residing irregularly. This is because the majority of people residing irregularly in many Global North countries arrived legally and overstayed their visa. Efforts to make border crossing more difficult may promote permanent settlement in place of earlier patterns of temporary migration.

== Types ==
=== Visa restrictions and carrier sanctions ===
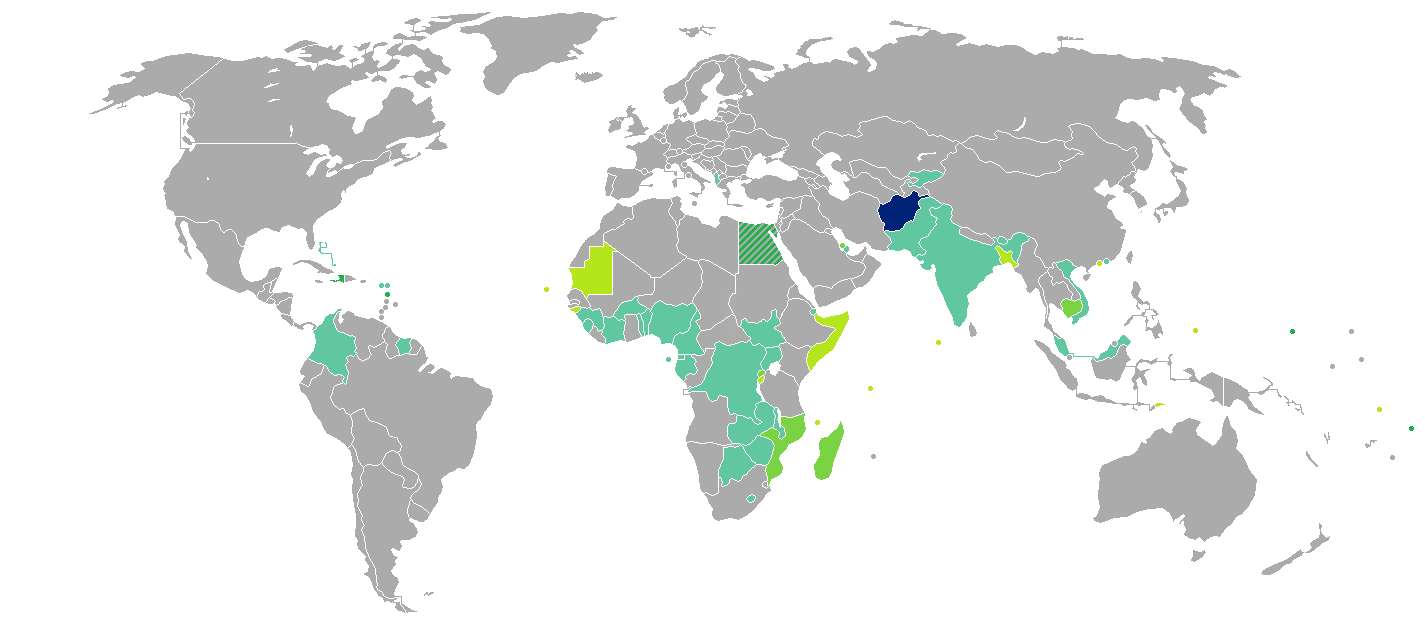
Visa requirements for Afghan citizens are among the most strict in the world. In 2018, Afghan nationals could only access 30 countries without a visa.

There is a strong correlation between visa restrictions and the number of refugees from a country; all of the world's ten largest producers of refugees are also among those with the strictest visa requirements. Because visa restrictions are applied to all countries whose nationals are usually recognized as refugees when they apply for asylum, FitzGerald states that "the main goal of the visa policies is not to restrict asylum seekers without valid claims, but to keep out people even if they are refugees".

Carrier sanctions impose penalties on transportation companies, such as passenger shipping and airlines, who carry unauthorized passengers without a valid visa. For people entitled to refugee protection who are unable to reach the destination country because of carrier sanctions, there are two possibilities: either they are denied refugee protection or embark on irregular migration, which carries the risk of death. According to researchers Theodore Baird and Thomas Spijkerboer, the visa and carrier sanctions regime could be abolished by insisting that all border control is done at the actual border, by state agents instead of private companies.

=== Marketing ===
Another form of externalization is marketing campaigns aimed at people who are considering irregular migration to discourage them. The United States is known for deceptive campaigns that mislead viewers as to their origin.

=== Interdiction of boats in international waters ===
Another form of externalization is the interception of boats in international waters to prevent them from reaching the destination country. The interception may be done by boats belonging to the country trying to control migration, in the form of maritime pushbacks, or by a third country, in which case they are pullbacks. Some international requirements require boat patrols by transit countries such as Morocco, which is of doubtful compliance with international human rights law. Intercepting people who try to leave a country can violate the right to leave any country, an internationally recognized human right. Although many states justify their interventions in humanitarian language, "offshore enforcement by any other name continues to be highly correlated with migrant deaths".

Human rights abuses that occur at sea are difficult and expensive for rights organizations or investigative journalists to monitor. In the mid-2010s, such efforts by NGOs in the Mediterranean led to a strong state crackdown; FitzGerald argues that "the fact that governments try so hard to avoid [monitoring] suggests that it is having some effect".

=== Agreements with third countries ===
Cooperation in externalization can be voluntary, but it often involves the coercive and neocolonial exploitation of power imbalance by Global North countries. A limitation on the success of agreements with source and transit countries to restrict is that these countries' values and interests do not necessarily coincide with the states trying to restrict access. For example, supporters of anti-immigration in the Global North typically want to limit all external immigration which limits the visa and immigration liberalization they are willing to offer to transit countries in exchange with their cooperation. Another obstacle is that many African and Latin American countries support freedom of movement for economic and political reasons and therefore complying with externalization policies can threaten their core interest. During the 2010s, externalization policies increasingly extended beyond neighboring countries to those farther away in Africa, the Middle East, and Central America. The reliance on externalization in migration control makes the destination countries dependent on the ability and willingness of other countries to cooperate.

FitzGerald argues that third-country agreements to constrain migration can have upsides for human rights protection. In general, in order to maintain the appearance of compliance with human rights, the most severe abuses must be avoided. He notes that "paying and training undemocratic buffer states to carry out abusive policies, are less effective when their secret violence becomes public knowledge" via exposure by journalists and human rights activists. The irregularization of migrants in transit countries leaves them more vulnerable to violence including extortion, robbery, rape, and murder; systematic human rights abuses have been reported. For example, Vasja Badalič states that "the EU supports, and relies on, Tunisia’s systemic violations of human rights in order to prevent irregular migrants from reaching the EU".

States that encourage human rights abuses abroad can be considered legally responsible or complicit in these abuses. An example of human rights violations occurring in third countries at the behest of immigration-restricting states is the establishment of camps at Manus Island and Nauru at Australia's request. Between 2015 and 2021, the EU paid the Libyan Coast Guard, an EU proxy force, $455 million. The European Union's partners in Libya have been documented engaging in human trafficking, slavery, torture, and other rights violations. A 2021 United Nations fact-finding report found that abuses against migrants in Libya by state and non-state actors, including the Libyan Coast Guard, are likely to amount to crimes against humanity. A 2021 investigation by The Outlaw Ocean Project and The New Yorker found that "The E.U. pays for almost every aspect of Libya's often lethal migrant detention system", including body bags. Libya's former justice minister, Salah Marghani, commented that the goal of Europe's externalization policies is to "Make Libya the disguise for their policies while the good humans of Europe say they are offering money to help make this hellish system safer." The anti-migration policies can have permanent effects on countries that cooperate in them. Risks include violence against migrants and increased instability and corruption.

Agreements to allow deportation of either their own nationals or nationals of other countries that pass through are strongly opposed by the citizens of many African countries. Despite strong pressure, the African Union opposes all involuntary returns. The Cotonou Agreement expired in early 2020 and has not been replaced because of differences between the European Union and the African Union on deportation. Many Africans oppose deportation because it is considered inhumane, threatens their access to remittances from family members living abroad, and exacerbates already high youth unemployment. There is little incentive to cooperate in readmission because remittances are higher than foreign and development aid combined for most low- and middle-income countries. The European Union's programs to reintegrate returned migrants have been mostly ineffective. A 2021 study found that formal and informal readmission agreements had little effect on the return rate.

== Externalization by country or territory ==
=== Australia ===
Australia's migration-control externalization policy, called the "Pacific Solution", dates to 2001 when the Australian navy began interdicting migrants on the high seas. That year, a Norwegian freighter rescued migrants from an overcrowded vessel and sought to bring them to Australia’s Christmas Island, as the closest safe harbor, but the Australian military intercepted the Tampa and prevented its passengers from disembarking on the island, transferring them to an Australian military vessel. At the end of the year, Australia excised Christmas Island and other outlying territories from Australian immigration law, thus prohibiting asylum seekers that found their way there from claiming asylum in the country. They also began transferring the detained people to Nauru or Papua New Guinea, where they are confined in camps, before being resettled in those countries.

With the closure of some of the camps, some refugees have seen been resettled in countries such as Canada, the United States and New Zealand.

=== European Union ===
The signing of the Schengen Agreement in 1980s forced some countries, such as Italy, to start drafting their first laws to legislate the "integration" of immigrants. Italy, which was in need of immigrant labour at the time, did so with policy thinking heavily influenced by humanitarian impulses and a relatively open approach (until 1998, Italy didn't even commonly allow the practice of administrative detention pending deportation hearings). However, as integration proved complicated and with political instability rising in the former Yugoslavia, Africa and the Middle East, things started changing. In 2002, Italy under the leadership of Silvio Berlusconi passed the harsh "Bossi-Fini law" that, among other things, criminalized irregular migration, turning migrants already in the country into security threats and limiting their economic options. This caused some people who would have once classified themselves as economic migrants to try to seek asylum instead, as the only route to settling and working in Europe. It also contributed to the growth of new service providers: the people smuggling industry.

In 2003, the United Kingdom worked on a policy paper called "A New Vision for Refugees", which proposed that the European Union establish Regional Protection Areas near refugee-producing countries, where refugees would be processed for possible resettlement in the EU, but, finding insufficient support, the proposal was withdrawn and never formally considered. Nonetheless, it marked the beginning of externalization in Europe. By the end of the year, Spain had managed to convince Morocco to criminalize irregular migration, and they began joint naval patrols around the strait of Gibraltar and the Canary Islands. The EU gave Morocco more than €60 million for border management between 2003 and 2010.

Between 2004 and 2006, the Aeneas program gave €120 million to countries that cooperated with Europe on migration control; the EU signed partnerships with Cape Verde, Moldova, Georgia, Armenia, Azerbaijan, Tunisia, Jordan, Belarus, and Ukraine; while several operations were launched on the maritime side: Operation Hera between the Canary Islands and the west coast of Africa; Agios, Minerva, and Indalo in the western Mediterranean; Nautilus and Hermes in the Central Mediterranean; and Poseidon in the Aegean. Some states, like Mali, resisted becoming "buffer states" at the EU's request, due to their reliance on skilled immigrant labor that benefited from the intra-african mobility. France retaliated in 2008 by cutting its development aid.

That same year, Italy's Berlusconi signed a controversial €5 billion deal with then-dictator Muammar Gaddafi, which included access to oil-rich Libya for Italian companies; the headline agreements, however, overshadowed Gaddafi's commitment to upgrade Libya's border management and allow Italian ships to push boats back to Libyan shores, which continued following the fall of Gaddafi, with Libya’s post-revolutionary authorities.

In the early 2010s, there was a new wave of solidarity, with Germany’s Chancellor Angela Merkel promising a permissive approach to immigration and Italy's Prime Minister Matteo Renzi supporting an ambitious program called operation Mare Nostrum, which rescued at least 150 thousand migrants, while Italy provided legal assistance for asylum claims.

With the 2015 European migrant crisis, however, Europe became polarized, and the previous optimism started fading. Integration and resettlement remained difficult, with several attacks from African immigrants happening in Germany; the Mare Nostrum operation had huge costs, which Italy couldn't sustain while going through its third recession in six years; Poland and Hungary, both run by far-right leaders, became more and more reluctant to accept migrants; officials in Austria talked of building a wall on its Italian border; Italy's hard-right politicians mocked and denounced Renzi, and their poll numbers skyrocketed. At the end of 2016, Renzi resigned, and his party eventually rolled back his policies. After this, investing in the externalization of Europe’s borders became a natural solution. The EU first sought to shift responsibility towards the Western Balkans but ultimately signed a pact with Turkey, the main transit country for the 850,000 arrivals in Greece in 2015. However, that deal funneled migrants towards the Mediterranean route between Libya and Italy, forcing Italy to sign new deals with Tunisia and Libya. In addition to the political deals, Italy’s then-interior minister Marco Minniti also performed a series of negotiations with militias and other non-state actors, effectively turning smugglers into coastguards and detention center managers, and the EU pressured Niger to adopt serious border controls. Meanwhile, the EU's border agency, Frontex, began a "systematic effort to capture" immigrants crossing the sea, while Greece, Spain, and Malta began turning away humanitarian boats carrying rescued immigrants. At the Valletta Summit on Migration, the EU launched the Emergency Trust Fund for Africa, which included hundreds of millions of euros to law enforcement agencies and border controls in Egypt, Libya, Tunisia, Algeria and Morocco. Afterwards, the July 2017 EU Foreign Affairs Council reinforced the Minniti deal by facilitating the use of EU policy instruments such as the EU Border Assistance Mission and Operation Sophia.

The deals appeared to yield results at first: by 2018, year-on-year arrivals on the central Mediterranean route had fallen by almost 100 thousand, and countries such as Turkey and Morocco significantly cut irregular migration to Europe over the medium term. From 2020 onwards, the number of migrants arriving in Italy from Libya and Tunisia rose again. In 2023, after a coup d'état in Niger, Niger repealed the anti-immigrant law it had since 2015, reopening one of the most used routes before the agreement. In early 2024, Spain and the European Union signed a €200 million agreement with Mauritania to reduce the number of people arriving to Spain's Canary Islands by boat.

Offshore processing, which has had dozens of failed proposals by numerous countries since Denmark's first suggested it in 1986, started gaining momentum again the 2020s and, in 2023, Italy's prime minister Giorgia Meloni signed a deal with her counterpart in Albania, Edi Rama, to send asylum seekers to the country for processing. A few weeks after the announcement, however, the deal was temporarily blocked by the Albanian constitutional court.

Externalization also created an implicit power exchange: the EU and member states handed partner countries leverage and considerable financial and material resources to improve their security structures – but gained little to no European leverage over them in return. It also allowed leaders in partner countries to extort Europeans by threatening to open the migratory floodgates: Turkey’s president Recep Tayyip Erdoğan regularly blackmails the EU by threatening to scrap the deal; Morocco has facilitated migrants towards Spanish territories seemingly to influence Spain’s Western Sahara policy; and Egyptian president Abdel Fattah el-Sisi leverages migration to attract ever-greater amounts of European funding to aid his economic crisis. The deals have also created significant reputational damage – as the EU and member states appear complicit in their partners' human rights abuses.

As part of the externalization of asylum procedures, Italy and Albania signed a migration protocol in November 2023 granting Italy jurisdiction to operate two migrant facilities on Albanian territory for at least five years, a policy implemented in 2024 that by October 2025 had led to the detention of only a limited number of migrants, most of whom were returned to Italy following judicial decisions. The detention centre in Gjadër has been criticised by politicians and human rights observers for its lack of transparency, prison-like conditions, and serious risks to detainees’ mental health, including reports of frequent self-harm, suicide attempts, and inadequate access to legal and medical safeguards.

=== Israel ===
In 2013, Israel announced that it had reached an agreement with a third country for the "voluntary" transference of asylum seekers and, in 2014, it began implementing the agreement. The following years, thousand of asylum seekers (especially Eritrean and Sudanese nationals) were relocated to Rwanda and Uganda, until its cancellation in 2018, after years of protest. Several of the resettled refugees then tried to find their way to Europe.

=== Japan ===
Japan didn't have a refugee policy until the 1970s. When the first refugee boats from Vietnam reached the port of Chiba in '75 after being rescued by a US ship, Japanese authorities received them according to maritime law, but shipped them to Guam (a US territory in the pacific) the following day. Until the end of the decade, more than 2 thousand Indochinese refugees arrived in Japan or were born there to refugee parents, with only 10 being given long-term resident status, while the rest only remained in the country while the government searched for safe third countries to settle them in.

As the Indochinese refugee crisis worsened, the United States and other countries pressured Japan to accept more refugees and provide relief assistance, leading Japan to accept more than 10 thousand Southeast Asian refugees until 2005.

=== South Korea ===
South Korea followed a similar policy as Japan in the 1970s and 1980s, allowing Vietnamese refugees to enter the country, being temporarily housed in Busan before being resettled. Up until 2001, South Korea had not granted asylum to a single applicant, slightly atoning for this behavior in the following two decades, but still keeping low acceptance rates.

=== United Kingdom ===
From 2000, deportation of rejected asylum seekers in the UK rose sharply. In 2003, when still part of the European Union, British Prime Minister Tony Blair's cabinet worked on a policy paper called "A New Vision for Refugees", which proposed that the European Union establish Regional Protection Areas near refugee-producing countries, where refugees would be processed for possible resettlement in the EU, but, finding insufficient support, the proposal was withdrawn and never formally considered.

In 2022, the UK started working on the Rwanda asylum plan, whereby illegal immigrants or asylum seekers would have been relocated to Rwanda for processing, asylum and resettlement. The plan faced some legal issues, but it received legal clearance from the High Court. In 2023, however, the Court of Appeal ruled that the plan was unlawful, with an appeal to the Supreme Court of the United Kingdom leading to a concurrence with the lower court later on.

=== United States of America ===
The United States' externalization of migration controls dates back at least to the Reagan Administration and the 1981 Interdiction Agreement between the United States and Haiti, which authorized the U.S. Coast Guard to interdict Haitian vessels on the high seas, detain the passengers, and return them to Haiti. Following the 1991 Haitian coup d'état and subsequent spike in the number of Haitians trying to get to the US by boat, President George H. W. Bush reinforced those deals.

In 1993, the US Coast Guard intercepted a ship 200 miles off Honduras carrying 200 Chinese people trying to reach the United States. Honduran authorities allowed the US Coast Guard to force the ship to a Honduran port and, after analysis of the situation, the entire group ended up being repatriated. Later in the Clinton Administration, it was decided to detain interdicted Haitians temporarily at the U.S. naval base in Guantánamo, Cuba rather than summarily return them to Haiti. Clinton also extended this externalization to Cuban boat and raft migrants as well. In the meantime, Guam was becoming a hotspot for Chinese asylum seekers and the US increased surveillance around its shores to prevent Chinese people from reaching it. After the 2004 Haitian coup d'état and yet another increase of crossing attempts by Haiti nationals, President George W. Bush announced "I have made it abundantly clear to the Coast Guard that we will turn back any refugee that attempts to reach our shore". During the presidency of Barack Obama, those found to have "credible fears" were brought to Guantánamo where they underwent a refugee status determination without the benefit of legal representation; the few who were recognized as refugees were then held at Guantánamo pending third country resettlement, not being considered for resettlement to the United States.

In the meantime, the U.S. performed externalization of migration controls on land as well. In 1989, an internal Immigration and Naturalization Service (INS) memo called on the INS liaison in Mexico "to secure the assistance of Mexico and Central American countries to slow down the flow of illegal aliens into the United States". At least since 1998, the US government has paid for the rental of buses to repatriate Honduras and El Salvador nationals apprehended near the Mexico-Guatemala border. In 2008, through the Mérida Initiative, the U.S. Congress appropriated about $2.5 billion in assistance to Mexico to help prevent the "illicit flow of drugs, people, arms, and cash". In the 2010s, Obama then asked Congress for an emergency supplemental appropriation of $3.7 billion, expanding the deal to other Central American countries.

After the election of Donald Trump as President of the United States and his public hostility towards their southern neighbors, it became controversial within Mexico for the government to control transit and seemingly do Trump's bidding, leading to a relaxation on Mexico's control of irregular transits.

== See also ==
- Pushback (migration)
- Detention centres in Libya
- Protests at UNHCR humanitarian center in Agadez

== Sources ==
- Badalič, Vasja (2019). "Tunisia's Role in the EU External Migration Policy: Crimmigration Law, Illegal Practices, and Their Impact on Human Rights". Journal of International Migration and Integration. 20 (1): 85–100. doi:10.1007/s12134-018-0596-7. S2CID 96503039.
- Baird, Theodore; Spijkerboer, Thomas (2019). "Carrier Sanctions and the Conflicting Legal Obligations of Carriers: Addressing Human Rights Leakage". Amsterdam Law Forum. 11 (1): 4–19. doi:10.37974/ALF.325. ISSN 1876-8156. S2CID 169666209.
- FitzGerald, David Scott (2019). Refuge beyond Reach: How Rich Democracies Repel Asylum Seekers. Oxford University Press. ISBN 978-0-19-087417-9.
- FitzGerald, David Scott (2020). "Remote control of migration: theorising territoriality, shared coercion, and deterrence". Journal of Ethnic and Migration Studies. 46 (1): 4–22. doi:10.1080/1369183X.2020.1680115. hdl:10315/41482. S2CID 210464680.
- Gammeltoft-Hansen, Thomas; Tan, Nikolas Feith (2021). "Extraterritorial Migration Control and Deterrence". The Oxford Handbook of International Refugee Law. Oxford University Press. ISBN 978-0-19-258833-3.
- Grewcock, Michael (2014). "Australian border policing: regional 'solutions' and neocolonialism". Race & Class. 55 (3): 71–78. doi:10.1177/0306396813509197. S2CID 146586540.
- Hahonou, Eric Komlavi; Olsen, Gorm Rye (2021). "Niger – Europe's border guard? Limits to the externalization of the European Union's migration policy". Journal of European Integration. 43 (7): 875–889. doi:10.1080/07036337.2020.1853717. S2CID 229405082.
- Hintjens, Helen; Bilgic, Ali (2019). "The EU's Proxy War on Refugees". State Crime Journal. 8 (1): 80–103. doi:10.13169/statecrime.8.1.0080. ISSN 2046-6056. JSTOR 10.13169/statecrime.8.1.0080. S2CID 181400174.
- Kalpouzos, Ioannis (2020). "International Criminal Law and the Violence against Migrants". German Law Journal. 21 (3): 571–597. doi:10.1017/glj.2020.24. ISSN 2071-8322. S2CID 216289557.
- Markard, Nora (2016). "The Right to Leave by Sea: Legal Limits on EU Migration Control by Third Countries". European Journal of International Law. 27 (3): 591–616. doi:10.1093/ejil/chw034.
- Menjívar, Cecilia (2014). "Immigration Law Beyond Borders: Externalizing and Internalizing Border Controls in an Era of Securitization". Annual Review of Law and Social Science. 10 (1): 353–369. doi:10.1146/annurev-lawsocsci-110413-030842. ISSN 1550-3585.
- Missbach, Antje; Phillips, Melissa (2020). "Introduction: Reconceptualizing Transit States in an Era of Outsourcing, Offshoring, and Obfuscation". Migration and Society. 3 (1): 19–33. doi:10.3167/arms.2020.111402. S2CID 240877173.
- Spijkerboer, Thomas (2018). "The Global Mobility Infrastructure: Reconceptualising the Externalisation of Migration Control". European Journal of Migration and Law. 20 (4): 452–469. doi:10.1163/15718166-12340038. ISSN 1388-364X. S2CID 150019997.
- Stock, Inka; Üstübici, Ayşen; Schultz, Susanne U. (2019). "Externalization at work: responses to migration policies from the Global South". Comparative Migration Studies. 7 (1): 48–. Bibcode:2019CmpMS...7...48S. doi:10.1186/s40878-019-0157-z. ISSN 2214-594X. S2CID 209406748.
- Stutz, Philipp; Trauner, Florian (2021). "The EU's 'return rate' with third countries: Why EU readmission agreements do not make much difference". International Migration. 60 (3): 154–172. doi:10.1111/imig.12901. S2CID 237763172.
- Van Dessel, Julia (2021). "Externalization through 'awareness-raising': the border spectacle of EU migration information campaigns in Niger" (PDF). Territory, Politics, Governance. 11 (4): 749–769. doi:10.1080/21622671.2021.1974535. hdl:2013/ULB-DIPOT:oai:dipot.ulb.ac.be:2013/333627. S2CID 239555955.
- Williams, Kira; Mountz, Alison (2018). "Between Enforcement and Precarity: Externalization and Migrant Deaths at Sea". International Migration. 56 (5): 74–89. doi:10.1111/imig.12439.
- Wolff, Sarah; Hadj-Abdou, Leila (2017). "Mediterranean migrants and refugees". Routledge Handbook of Mediterranean Politics. Routledge Handbooks Online. doi:10.4324/9781315696577. hdl:11693/50917. ISBN 978-1-138-90398-2.
