= Racism in Malaysia =

Malaysia is a multi-ethnic country, with a predominantly Malay Muslim population. Racism, along with xenophobia and religious discrimination, are embodied within the attitudes of Malaysians, and also within policies, institutions, and the Constitution of Malaysia itself. This racism is not just exprienced by the minorities — who are the Chinese, Indians, indigenous people (Malay: Orang Asli), as well as migrant workers and refugees from foreign countries — but also by the Malays, who make up the majority in Malaysia. Racism occurs in education, employment, healthcare, housing, justice, and daily life.

The concept of Malay supremacy (Malay: Ketuanan Melayu) is widely accepted by the Malay-majority political sphere. Government policies favour the Malays, and in principle, the natives of Sabah and Sarawak. However, in practice, the natives of Sabah and Sarawak do not benefit much from these policies, with them composing most of the bottom 40% income cohort of Malaysia. Rather, it is the Malays who receive heavily subsidised education in and make up the bulk of local universities. The resources of Sarawak have been exploited for decades, with the Malaysian government enriching governmental officials and their associates.

While 179 countries have ratified the International Convention on the Elimination of All Forms of Racial Discrimination (ICERD), Malaysia is not one of them. The Pakatan Harapan government that replaced Barisan Nasional in 2018 had indicated a readiness to ratify the ICERD, but has yet to do so due to its conflict with the Constitution of Malaysia and the race and religious norms in Malaysia established since its independence.

The Malaysia Racism Report by Pusat KOMAS recorded a highest of 107 reported cases of racism in 2025, the highest number of the 11 years the annual reports were published, since 2015.

== Demographics of Races in Malaysia ==
Malays make up the majority — in 2026, 58.3% of the 34.4 million population (including non-citizens) are Malays. About 22.1% of the population is Malaysian Chinese, and Malaysian Indians comprise about 6.5% of the population.

There is also a small minority of indigenous people (Malay: Orang Asli) whose ancestors arrived in Malaysia over 7,000 years before the Malays arrived from what is today Taiwan roughly 3,000 years ago. These ancient people also split with some heading to Sulawesi and others progressing into Java and Sumatra. The final migration to the Malay Peninsula was roughly 3,000 years ago. A sub-group from Borneo moved to Champa in Vietnam roughly 4,500 years ago, then eventually moved to present day Kelantan. There are also traces of the Dong Song and HoaBinh migration from Vietnam and Cambodia. There was also the Southern Thai migration, from what we know as Patani (Narathiwat, Pattani, Yala, South Songkhla) today. All these groups share DNA and linguistic origins traceable to Taiwan, if not to southern China.

The Malay and Chinese (and also Indian) communities in Malaysia today appear at times at odds with each other given the polarisation caused by various policies under the Bumiputera policy.

The British, who had colonised the Malay Peninsula starting in 1876, had recognized the Malay states, as recorded by numerous literature by Frank Swettenham, Hugh Clifford, and many more of their scholars. Historians have noted that Western imperialism in Asia, including Malaysia, led to the importation of racial theories (e.g. scientific racism) from Europe, contributing to a fundamental shift in the perception of race among Asians. During the colonial era, Malaysian Chinese remained mostly isolated in the mining regions where they worked. In addition, some Malaysian Chinese were settled around the major towns, while the Malays had established their own villages.

In 2017, former prime minister Mahathir Mohamad insinuated Prime Minister Najib Razak was a robber due to his Bugis racial background. During the lead-up to the 2018 Malaysian general election , in which Mahathir won, he fanned anti-Chinese sentiments in the country by warning of an influx of foreign Chinese property owners. Such exploitation of race and religion for power has shattered the concept of a "Malaysian Malaysia" proposed by Lee Kuan Yew, with talent being lost to foreign countries due to exclusive job opportunities for the Malays.

Presently, the Malay language is the national language of Malaysia. While it is unique that more than four languages (mainly English, Malay, Mandarin Chinese and the Tamil language) are spoken widely in Malaysia today , the ethnic languages are mainly used by the ethnic groups respectively. The divide is quite prominent, especially in peninsular Malaysia, since the Malays mostly attend the Malaysian national schools but the Chinese and also the Indians, have their own vernacular schools, placing importance on their respective languages.

== Racism against non-Bumiputera ==
The Chinese and Indians are often derogatorily called pendatang (newcomers) by Malays, and sometimes asked to "go back to their countries". The Chinese are also called Cina-Babi (Chinese Pigs), with their main political party Democratic Action Party (DAP) called DA-Pig.

=== Institutionalised mechanisms against non-Bumiputera ===
Government policies of positive discrimination favour the Malay majority and the Bumiputera status, particularly in areas such as housing, finance, governance, and education. Economic policies designed to favour Bumiputera, including affirmative action in public education, were implemented in the 1970s in order to defuse inter-ethnic tensions following the 13 May Incident in 1969. However, these policies have not been fully effective in eradicating poverty among rural Bumiputeras and have further caused backlash, especially from the Chinese and Indians. These policies are enshrined in the Constitution of Malaysia, and questioning them is technically illegal.

UMNO, the ruling party since Malaysia's independence from Britain until May 2018 depended on the majority Malay population for votes by using laws that give Malays priority over other races in areas such as employment, education, finance, and housing. Such policies has been cited in Article 153 of the Constitution of Malaysia. UMNO also promotes Ketuanan Melayu, which is the idea that the ethnic Malays (Bumiputeras) should get special privileges in Malaysia.

Pro-Bumiputera Malays claim that The Federation of Malaya Agreement, signed on 21 January 1948 at King House by the Malay rulers and by Sir Edward Gent as the representative of the British government, let Malays be the leaders among three races. However, others have claimed that the Agreement promises equality to all three races who make up the population of Malaysia. Those were the original terms of The Federation of Malaya Agreement, which Dato' Onn Jaafar - then heading UMNO - had looked to abide by. However, in 1951 the UMNO began enshrining the rights of Malays over all other races in law. Today, Malays dominate in politics at both national and state levels, in the civil service, as well as military and security forces. The Chinese have traditionally dominated in the economy and live in large numbers in urban areas of Malaysia.

The Malay-controlled government ensures that all Bumiputera of Malay origin are given preferential treatment regardless of merit. Government benefits for Malays include discounts for new houses and preferential treatment in public housing, cheaper burial plots, that all key government positions are to be held by Malays, a minimum of a 30% Malay Bumiputera equity to be held in listed companies, full funding for mosques and Islamic places of worship, special high earning interest trust funds, special share allocation for new share applications, and making the Malay language a compulsory examination paper.

In 1968, Prof. al-Attas, a member of the GERAKAN, engaged in a debate with Lim Kit Siang and the opposition from the Democratic Action Party (DAP) on the subject of Indonesian literature being made as part of the corpus of Malay Language literature, and on the idea of a Malaysian Malaysia. Responding towards Lim Kit Siang's claim that adopting Malay as the national language is racist and chauvinistic, Prof al-Attas argued that Malays cannot be accused as racist because a Chinese who becomes a Muslim and speaks the Malay Language can be considered a Malay; a Malay, however, can never be a Chinese. By this definition, however, a Malay that renounces Islam is no longer a Malay.

Racism towards non-Malays was promoted through the National Civics Bureau (Biro Tata Negara, BTN) and the Special Affairs Unit (JASA) agencies, which conducted training for civil servants and university students. Participants were indoctrinated with the Ketuanan Melayu concept and that non-Malays were a threat to Malays. After a series of exposures on social media, the government shut both down in 2018. In 2021, JASA was revived by the new government and took on the indoctrination programmes previously run by BTN.

The Kuala Lumpur Structure Plan 2040 had a proposal to maintain a 40% Malay and Bumiputera population in Kuala Lumpur.

== Racial Inequality in Education ==
=== Vernacular Schools ===
Along with the national primary schools teaching in the national language of Malay, there are 2 vernacular primary schools that teach in Mandarin Chinese and the Tamil language, catering to the Chinese and the Indians respectively. All schools have a similar curriculum regardless of the language of instruction, and Malay is a compulsory subject.

Vernacular schools have always been a controversial topic among Malaysians, and is often racialised and politicised. For the Malays, these schools seem to be at odds with Malay supremacy, the status of Malay being the dominant language, national identity, and the state agenda of national integration. The Chinese are more concerned about the teacher shortage, allocation of development funds, and the preservation of these schools. The removal of these schools is seen as a threat to the ethnic and lingustic indentities of the minorities and their forced assimilation into Malay culture. The controversy of this topic has often been used as a scapegoat for other more relevant issues.

=== Unified Examination Certificate (UEC) ===
The Unified Examination Certificate (UEC) is a certificate of secondary education obtained by Malaysian Chinese independent high school students, equivalent to the Sijil Pelajaran Malaysia (SPM). The recognition of the UEC by local universities is also another controversial, often racialised topic in Malaysia. Since most subjects in the UEC syllabus are taught in Mandarin, its recognition is seen as a threat to the role of Malay as the national language. A counter-argument is that students with this certificate must still pass the subjects of Malay and History in the Sijil Pelajaran Malaysia (SPM) examinations to be admitted into local universities.

=== Higher Public Education ===
The lack of meritocracy in the Malaysian education system is a valid concern, and this creates even more disparity between various groups in Malaysia. In the tertiary education system, one of the options after taking the Sijil Pelajaran Malaysia is the matriculation system. However, matriculation is highly limited for non-Malays, with 90 percent of the available spots going to Malays. When it comes to the number of student places in Government universities, where 90% of placements are reserved for the Bumiputera, leaving many Chinese and Indians with no choice but to turn to significantly costlier private universities.

== Racial Inequality in the Job Environment ==
A study by the Centre for Governance and Political Studies (Cent-GPS) conducted an experiment Study on 7 fictitious candidates by sending 7 fictitious resumes representing 7 candidates (Male and female, Malay, Indian, and Chinese candidates) 3,829 times in total to over 500 job vacancies across the Klang Valley. No fictitious Sabahan nor Sarawakians were involved in this study. Out of these 7, the study concluded that employers in the business sector are actively looking for Chinese candidates.

The study had 3 hypothesis, the first being ethnic Malay applicants will be discriminated against in Malaysia's business sector compared to their non-bumiputera peers. The study found that the fictitious Chinese candidates dominated the callbacks by a huge margin. The two male and female Chinese candidates obtained more job callbacks than their Malay and Indian counterparts combined. No details regarding whether it was a Malay, Indian, or Chinese management company were included in the study, a confound that would likely lead to a skew the results given the racial tensions and linguistic barriers due to the lack of a communal lingua franca that is neutral and does not favour any one race.

The second hypothesis was that Mandarin is a key factor in helping or boosting a candidate's chance of securing a job interview. The study finds that when companies list “Mandarin required” in their advertisement, it was actually a filter to hire Chinese candidates.

Their third hypothesis was that the hijab plays a crucial factor in determining a candidate's success in job applications. The study found that a Malay girl not wearing a hijab gets more callbacks than a one who does.

The study concluded that even if candidates had the same qualifications, education, and experience, their ethnicity still plays a vital role in the success of a job application for a business graduate. Only business graduates were studied in this study, with other fields of study being suitable for an attempt for replication of this study.

== Racism against Indians ==
Malaysian Indians and sometimes people from other South Asian countries are derogatorily called Keling in Malaysia. They are also often called smelly or denied housing because of "heavy cooking".

In 2010, a Malaysian court sentenced a Malay to just a week in jail and only fined 11 others for a brandishing a cow's head during a protest against the construction of a Hindu temple. Critics said the light sentences would further strain race relations between the majority Malay Muslims and minority Hindu Indians, Chinese as well as Christians of various races who complain of discrimination. The 12 were from a group who had marched in August 2009 with the bloodied head of a cow, to protest a plan to build a Hindu temple in their mainly Muslim neighbourhood. Hindus, who consider the cow to be a sacred animal, were offended and angered.

== Racism against Orang Asli ==
Orang Asli are the indigenous people of Malaysia. They are often racially stereotyped as primitive, dirty, and alcoholics. They are also often marginalised by media because they do not constitute a constituency considered politically important, hence not given the space and agency to give their thoughts and views. Besides, Orang Asli students are often bullied in schools, both verbally and physically. Sakai is a derogatory term used against Orang Asli.

Orang Asli also face multiple layers of barriers that continue to block their access to identification and therefore healthcare. Furthermore, Many Orang Asli are evicted from their villages, had their houses demolished, or land deforested, for plantations and development projects.

== Other ethnic groups ==
=== Rohingya people ===
Following COVID-19 outbreaks in 2020, Rohingya people had been accused for spreading the disease. Hateful messages against the ethnic group on social media platforms, such as Twitter and Facebook, were also widespread. Users also demanded for refoulement of Rohingya people to Myanmar and threatened prominent Rohingya activists and their supporters with physical attacks, murder, and sexual violence. Some comments compared the ethnic group with dogs, parasites, and pigs.

=== Bajau Laut ===
In 2024, a village of Bajau Laut had been demolished by Malaysian authority in the state of Sabah, garnering nation media attention, highlighting the situation Bajau Laut faced. The stateless Bajau Laut people face discrimination and racism due to their stateless status and ethnic stereotype and suspicion of fifth column (due to their nomadic status and traveling between Philippines archipelago, and due to North Borneo dispute).

== See also ==
- 13 May Incident
- 2001 Kampung Medan riots
- Article 153 of the Constitution of Malaysia
- Hindu Rights Action Force
- Ketuanan Melayu
- Perkasa
- Racial politics in Malaysia
- Xenophobia in Malaysia
