= Xenophobia in Malaysia =

Xenophobia refers to the fear or dislike of individuals or cultural groups perceived as foreign, often closely associated with racism. In Malaysia, xenophobia sentiments are frequently directed at foreign workers, particularly those from countries such as Bangladesh and Indonesia. There is also notable xenophobia towards individuals from the neighbouring countries of Singapore and Indonesia. Additionally, discrimination has been reported against people of African descent and those from East Malaysia. It is observed that xenophobic attitudes are more prevalent in Peninsular Malaysia (West Malaysia) than in East Malaysia.

== Xenophobia against migrant workers ==
Although Malaysia heavily depends on migrant workers in sectors such as construction, manufacturing, plantations, and domestic work, they are often seen as economic, security, or public health threats, even more so during times of economic stress or crisis.

The number of migrant workers in Malaysia is estimated to be between 2 to 4 million, with about 2.2 million being registered and the same number being unregistered (i.e. undocumented or irregular migration). The majority are from Indonesia, Nepal, and Bangladesh. There are also many workers from Myanmar and Cambodia, as well as small numbers from Vietnam, India, the Philippines, Pakistan, Thailand, China, and Sri Lanka.

Malaysia’s migration policies discriminates based on social class, with stricter restrictions for low-skilled, low-waged migrant workers, compared to “expatriates” who are more highly skilled and paid. Additionally, the incorporation of these low-status workers into society is seen as undesirable. The temporary labour migration system is designed to make sure they do not eventually settle in Malaysia, with work permit holders not being allowed to marry citizens, which would then lead to citizenship.

=== Bangladeshis ===
Main sources:

Human rights experts at the United Nations (UN) have cited “widespread and systematic” exploitation of Bangladeshi migrant workers in Malaysia.

Bangladeshis constitute 14% (approx. 250,000) of regular migrants, while it is high as 41% (approx. 580,000) of migrants who arrived by irregular migration. Bangladesh’s relatively weaker position and image make Bangladeshis seem inferior to Malaysians, with them stereotyped as being criminals. They are treated as lesser humans by employers and the society, being called dirty or smelly, also because of their darker skin and their low-status jobs.

The hierarchically “lower” nationality of Bangladeshis and their status as foreign labour restricts them to low-waged jobs (lower than Malaysians’ wages in the same job).

==== Recruitment ====
According to a 2015 study, Bangladeshis pay the highest recruitment fees (often more than 5 times the standard rate), yet receive the lowest wages, leaving them in debt despite them migrating to support their families in the first place. Some are even defrauded and given fake visas and air tickets after they paid the supposed fees then are either not able to leave Bangladesh or deported from Malaysia. Besides, migrants do not know the official costs for documents and hence depend on middlemen who charge high costs for them or provide inauthentic ones.

==== Living and working conditions ====
Upon arrival, migrants live in poor conditions such as cramped accommodations. They work longer than 10 hours per day on average and are often not paid for sick leaves. They also do not get appropriate healthcare as they fear discrimination, having their undocumented status exposed, language barriers, etc. Deaths due to these unsafe conditions are not investigated either. 2 Bangladeshi workers die per day, with there being 96 deaths in January 2019 alone, a number that have doubled since 2012.

Reports in 2019 also found that Bangladeshi workers were traded around different firms, who would then confiscate their documentation and underpay them. Immigration raids are common, and those without documentation are held at detention centres. Furthermore, there are reports of individuals unpaid for long periods and some being forced into work they did not agree to. Even successful Bangladeshi entrepreneurs often evoke envy and resentment in the small local business community, inciting violence as a form of revenge.

==== Marriage ====
Bangladeshi men are considered by locals as undesirable marriage partners. In Malaysia, the image of a Bangladeshi male migrant worker is that of a handsome sexual predator who seduces women, and is dishonest and untrustworthy. It is said that they marry Malaysians only as a way to stay in the country. Another narrative is that they will abandon their Malaysian wives and return to Bangladesh.

By the mid-1990s, when Bangladeshi migration was increasing, reports of violence over their supposed relationships or interactions with local women appeared in media. A media review done in 2013 found headlines such as “Bollywood-looking Bangladeshis cause ‘social problems’” and “Crackdown on visas of ‘heart-throb’ Bangladeshis”. In the 2000s, a widely-circulated “joke” included the line “Get Bangladeshi workers, Malay girls missing”. In 2016, a picture of a wedding between a Bangladeshi man and Malay woman received much online abuse. A 2020 article in Nona (magazine) warned Malay women against marrying Bangladeshi men who would "take advantage of them and then abuse or leave them". A plan to bring in more Bangladeshi workers in 2016 caused an uproar, with the Small and Medium Entrepreneurs Organisation of Malaysia hosting a press conference in which Bangladeshis were asked questions such as “[Bangladeshis] married Malays with the intention of starting a business, right?”. This event was to protest against them by “proving” that Bangladeshis “enjoyed even more benefits than locals did” through marriage.

== By states ==
=== Penang ===
In 2014, the Penang state government conducted a referendum that resulted in a ban on foreigners cooking local Penang cuisine. The law has been criticised by foreign nationals and prominent local figures, including the well-known chef Redzuawan Ismail (Chef Wan), who expressed opposition to the ruling.

=== Johor ===
In Johor, there are frequent complaints regarding Singaporeans who cross the border to take advantage of Malaysia's lower prices, which are due to the weaker Malaysian ringgit compared to the Singaporean dollar. Local residents often blame Singaporean visitors for driving up prices in Johor, particularly in Johor Bahru. Consequently, Singaporeans visiting Johor have occasionally been targeted by criminals, especially for offences such as motor vehicle theft and snatch theft, as Singaporean vehicles are easily identifiable by their distinct licence plates.

== See also ==
- Anti-Chinese sentiment in Malaysia
- Anti-Filipino sentiment in Malaysia
- Anti-Indian sentiment in Malaysia
- Racism in Malaysia
