= Tajoura migrant center airstrike =

Attack in Greater Tripoli, Libya

- Part of Libyan Civil War (2014–present) and the European migrant crisis
- Tajoura migrant center airstrike (Libya)
- Location: 32°50′05″N 13°23′05″E; Tajoura, Libya
- Date: 2 July 2019; 23:30
- Target: Weapons storage warehouse/Nearby military base
- Attack type: Airstrike
- Deaths: 53
- Injuries: 130+
- Perpetrators: UN member state (per United Nations investigators) (Libya) Libyan National Army (per Government of National Accord; denied by Libyan National Army)

On 2 July 2019 at 23:30, during the Western Libya campaign, an airstrike hit the Tajoura Detention Center outside Tripoli,Libya, while hundreds of people were inside the facility. The detention center was being used as a holding facility for migrants and refugees trying to reach Europe when a storage hangar that it used as a residential facility was destroyed in an aerial bombing. The United Nations Human Rights Council stated that "It was known that there were 600 people living inside" the facility.

At least 53 people were killed and 130 were wounded. The LNA, which reportedly committed the strike targeting unarmed civilians, was condemned by several countries. The airstrike also raised scrutiny of the European Union's policy of cooperating with militias to detain migrants, and funding and training the Libyan Coast Guard which apprehended most of the migrants and refugees.

The Libyan Government of National Accord (GNA) initially claimed that the airstrike was conducted by the Libyan National Army (LNA) led by Khalifa Haftar but later attributed the attack to a United Arab Emirates (UAE) aircraft. In November 2019, United Nations investigators suspected that a non-Libyan Mirage 2000-9 jet had bombed the center. A January 2020 report by the United Nations Support Mission in Libya (UNSMIL) and the Office of the United Nations High Commissioner for Human Rights (OHCHR) stated that the strike was likely carried out with a guided bomb fired from a non-Libyan aircraft, again suggesting that a foreign Mirage 2000-9 had been used.

== Background ==
The Tajoura Detention Center is located 16 kilometres (10 mi) east of the Libyan capital of Tripoli. It is part of a network of 34 migrant detention centers across northwestern Libya which house at least 5,000 people. The centers are operated by the Government of National Accord (GNA) and are used to detain migrants attempting to reach Europe.

In April 2019, the Libyan National Army, under Haftar's command, began a major offensive to capture western Libya and the capital Tripoli. After an airstrike hit a target less than 100 metres (330 ft) from the detention center in May, the UN Refugee Agency called for the evacuation of refugees and migrants in detention centers in conflict areas of Tripoli. On 1 July 2019, the LNA said it had begun an air campaign. The LNA's spokesman said that the air campaign destroyed the main control room for drones at Mitiga International Airport, which led to the airport—Tripoli's only functioning airport—suspending civilian flights.

== Airstrike ==
Near midnight on 2 July an airstrike directly struck Tajoura Detention Center's residential hangar when migrant families were sleeping or listening to the conflict outside. A Doctors Without Borders medical coordinator counted 126 migrants living inside the center's hangar unit shortly before it was hit by the strike. Aerial photos from the scene show that the explosion caused the roof to collapse and blew out the walls of the section of the hangar where it struck. Reports were made to the UN that guards shot at refugees and migrants trying to flee from the airstrike. The United Nations Office for the Coordination of Humanitarian Affairs (OCHA) said there were two airstrikes, one hitting an unoccupied garage and one hitting a hangar containing around 120 refugees and migrants. OCHA also agreed with reports that escaping refugees and migrants were fired upon by guards. The Tripoli-based interior ministry firmly denied firing at fleeing refugees and migrants. A media advisor to the Tripoli-based Ministry of Health said in the aftermath that "there was blood and body parts all over the place" and the Tripoli-based government described it as a "massacre". Hospitals worked at above-average capacities as they attempted to treat a flood of injured patients from the attack. According to the United Nations, at least 53 people were killed in the airstrike and 130 were injured.

Haftar's forces, who are backed by Egypt, the United Arab Emirates and Russia, have said they were targeting a nearby military site. According to Amnesty International, there was a weapons storage warehouse in the same compound as the detention center; GNA Interior Minister Fathi Bashagha denied that weapons were stored at the compound.

== Legal actions ==
=== Calls for investigations ===
Foreign nations and international bodies like the UN and African Union collectively called for an investigation, condemning the airstrike and lamenting the loss of life. A spokesman for the United Nations Refugee Agency stated that the detention center's close proximity to a weapons warehouse made it a target by association. Michelle Bachelet, the UN's Human Rights Chief, said the airstrike might constitute a "war crime." In an official statement, Secretary-General António Guterres demanded a probe into "how this happened and who was responsible and to bring those individuals to account." The Middle East and North African director for Amnesty International, too, demanded that the International Criminal Court investigate the bombing as a war crime, highlighting the disaster as a "consequences of Libya and Europe's callous migration policies".

=== UNSMIL/OHCHR Jan 2020 report ===
In January 2020, UNSMIL and the Office of the United Nations High Commissioner for Human Rights (OHCHR) published a report on the pair of airstrikes.

During 3–6 July 2019, United Nations personnel visited the Daman building complex, which includes both the Daman brigade, a pro-GNA militia, and the Tajoura Detention Center, holding 616 migrants and refugees at the time of the hit, of which 126 were in the part of the hangar that was hit by one of the airstrikes. The investigators carried out interviews, documented the site for analysis of the munitions used and obtained video recording from surveillance cameras. On 3 November survivors of the attack, relocated to a new building, were again interviewed by UNSMIL. The investigators found that the first bomb hit a workshop used by the Daman Brigade, and the second hit the detention center. Both were followed by the sound of a fighter jet and a drone was heard after the second attack. Detention centre officials claimed that all the deaths were the result of the airstrikes; migrant and refugee interviewees said that three deaths were from gunfire.

The bomb that hit the hangar with the migrants and refugees hit at 23:39, making a crater on the ground about 4.2 metres (14 ft) in diameter and 2.7 metres (8.9 ft) deep. Both bombs appear to have been guided bombs, which, according to UNSMIL/OHCHR, neither the Libyan Army (GNA), the LNA nor other Libyan armed groups had available.

Interviewees stated that between the first and second strikes, the head of the detention centre shot dead three men who were trying to escape from the hangar. The head of the detention center denied the claim.

On 3 July, the LNA claimed to have carried out the first bombing but not the second. UNSMIL/OHCHR judged the airstrikes to probably have been carried out by a state other than Libya, either under LNA command or under the command of the foreign state aiming to support the LNA. UNSMIL/OHCHR cited page 126 of report S/2019/914 of the UN Panel of Experts on Libya, where the Panel argued that LNA military assets were incompatible with the precision guided missiles that appeared to have been used, and stated that Mirage 2000-9 fighters were present at the time at al-Khadim and Jufra air bases and could not have been maintained and supported by the LNA.

UNSMIL/OHCHR stated concerns that the airstrike that hit the detention center may have been illegal under international humanitarian law. They also stated that the Daman Brigade's responsibility in the close colocation a military target and the detention center, and detention center guards' failure to help the detainees flee to safety following the first strike, could constitute violations of international humanitarian law.

UNSMIL/OHCHR summarised their report by making recommendations to the GNA, the LNA, third parties supporting the two, and to the international community, for implementing international humanitarian law.

== Reactions ==
=== Libya ===
The Government of National Accord (GNA) blamed the attack on air forces associated with General Haftar of the Libyan National Army (LNA). Haftar had been waging an offensive against the UN-backed GNA in Tripoli since April, and the airstrike had occurred two days after the general threatened bombings in the area after announcing "traditional means" of war were insufficient. Although the LNA had announced plans for airstrikes in response to losing control of Gharyan, a spokesman for Haftar told The Independent that the allegations that the LNA was behind the bombing were "incorrect" because "the LNA has no air operations."

GNA Interior Minister Fathi Bashagha announced on 4 July that the government was considering closing detention centers and releasing all migrants as the government cannot ensure their protection. The next day, Bashagha accused the United Arab Emirates of bombing the migrant center with a US-made F-16 jet. When asked if the GNA had any proof that an Emirati jet conducted the attack, the Minister said: "The sound of the jet was identified by technicians and pilots who heard it. The destructive power [of the bombs] is very big and is similar to the destructive power [of the bombs dropped] in 2014."

=== International ===
The UN High Commissioner for Refugees and the International Organization for Migration made a joint statement: "Our two organizations strongly condemn this and any attack on civilian life. We also call for an immediate end to detention of migrants and refugees." The UN Security Council considered a resolution drafted by the United Kingdom which would have condemned the attack and called for a ceasefire, which didn't pass after not being endorsed by the United States. The African Union issued a statement via Commission Chair Moussa Faki reiterating its call for an immediate ceasefire and demanding that "an independent investigation be conducted to ensure that those responsible for this horrific crime [against] innocent civilians be brought to account." Faki also emphasized the need for humanitarian relief from the international community to protect migrant populations.

Foreign affairs ministries for regional neighbors of Libya and the United Arab Emirates similarly called for changes to international migrant-holding policies and condemned the strike as a war crime. The Minister for Foreign Affairs for Malta Carmelo Abdella emphasized that migrants and refugees in dangerous situations should be "swiftly transferred to safe places under the supervision and protections of the United Nation," and on 7 July Malta's government allowed 65 migrants rescued while sailing from Libya to Europe to stay in Malta to await relocation to the European Union. The Ministry of Foreign Affairs for Qatar, a regional neighbor to the accused United Arab Emirates, called for an "urgent international investigation" into the airstrike. Algeria's government similarly condemned the airstrike for the wanton deaths of civilians, and insisted on the "immediate return to the process of inclusive dialogue between all Libyan parties."

Representatives of nations outside of regions affected by the European migrant crisis stated their outrage while demanding investigations and policy changes. The U.S. State Department made an official statement for conflicting Libyan parties to "de-escalate fighting in Tripoli and return to the political process," and Turkey's Ministry of Foreign Affairs called the attack a "crime against humanity" and blamed Haftar's forces for the airstrike. The Ukrainian Ministry of Foreign Affairs similarly issued a similar statement emphasizing the need for a "comprehensive and credible investigation of this crime" and called for an immediate and unconditional ceasefire in order to prevent new casualties."

== Aftermath ==
In the week following the airstrike, the remaining detainees at the facility were either released or transferred to other detention centers. A migrant processing facility run by the UN Refugee Agency which seeks to evacuate refugees and asylum seekers received over 400 migrants from the Tajoura migrant center. However, days later, the Tajoura migrant center began receiving new detainees. By July 16, the migrant center housed around 200 migrants – including refugees recently intercepted by the Libyan coast guard, people transferred from other migrant facilities in Libya, and re-captured detainees who had escaped the facility during the airstrike.

== See also ==
- Detention Centres in Libya
