= David Fitzgerald =

David Fitzgerald may refer to:

- David FitzGerald (died 1176), medieval bishop of St David's in Wales
- David Scott FitzGerald, sociologist
- David Fitzgerald (cricketer) (born 1972), Australian first-class cricketer
- David Fitzgerald (field hockey) (born 1986)
- David Fitzgerald (hurler) (born 1996), Irish hurler
- David Fitzgerald (born 1951), British woodwind player and founding member of the band Iona
- Dave Fitzgerald (presenter)

== See also ==
- Dai Fitzgerald (1872–1951), Welsh rugby player
- Davy Fitzgerald (born 1971), Irish hurler
