= Switzerland Probashi =

Bangladeshi satirical social media page

- Native name: সুইজারল্যান্ড প্রবাসী
- Website type: Satirical Facebook page
- Available in: Bengali
- Country of origin: Bangladesh
- Current status: Active

Switzerland Probashi (Bengali: সুইজারল্যান্ড প্রবাসী, lit. 'Switzerland Expatriate') is a Bangladeshi satirical social media page that publishes parody-based and humorous content related to Bangladeshi expatriate life, international students, social behavior, and Bengali internet culture.

The page primarily publishes content in the Bengali language and features fictional recurring characters, edited conversations, and satire posts shared on Facebook.

== History ==
Switzerland Probashi was created by Bangladeshi expatriates living abroad to satirize the social dynamics within the diaspora community. The page gained significant traction among Bengali-speaking online audiences for its humorous commentary on contemporary internet culture and the realities of migrant life.

According to its founder, the platform was established as a response to personal experiences with social hostility and negative interactions within sections of the Bangladeshi expatriate community.

== Content and style ==
The page primarily utilizes fictional recurring characters, edited conversational formats, and exaggerated comedic scenarios to critique everyday social behavior and contemporary issues in Bangladesh. The page's fictional characters have been interpreted as representations of different social archetypes within Bangladeshi society and expatriate communities, including exploitative employers, migrant workers, and individuals displaying social or cultural elitism. Its content frequently focuses on the challenges faced by international students, the social divisions within expatriate groups, and the risks associated with irregular migration to Europe. The page frequently incorporates regional dialects and colloquial expressions from different parts of Bangladesh. Its satirical content often features locally used vocabulary and non-standard speech patterns as part of its characterization and comedic style.

Several fictional characters introduced by the page became widely discussed in Bangladeshi internet culture, most notably "Kamruzzaman Kamruzzaman". Other recurring characters include "Osman Goni", used to depict the dangers of irregular migration via North African routes, and "Basudeb Dhali", who appears in satires addressing communal tensions and minority issues in Bangladesh.

According to Bangla Stream, some readers interpret Kamruzzaman Kamruzzaman as a symbolic representation of individuals affected by bureaucratic difficulties and social power imbalances, while Osman Goni has been associated with exploitative employer figures appearing in diaspora narratives.

The founder stated that these characters were designed to criticize members of the diaspora community who maintain a condescending attitude toward people living in Bangladesh.

== Cultural impact and influence ==
Switzerland Probashi became a widely discussed Bangladeshi satire-based social media platforms during the 2023s. Several fictional characters and jokes associated with the page later spread across Bangladeshi online communities and online culture discussions.

The page has been described as using satire to explore class divisions, migration experiences, and social hierarchies within Bangladeshi expatriate communities.

The page was also noted for portraying clique culture and social tensions within Bangladeshi expatriate communities in Europe and North America.

In June 2026, the page received additional media coverage after it was targeted by a series of false copyright claims, which resulted in the temporary disabling of multiple administrator accounts and raised concerns over the page's continued availability.

== Academic discussion ==
The page and its satire-based online culture were discussed in a research-oriented article published by HelloTeen Journal, which analysed Bangladeshi internet culture and online satire communities.
