= Fortress Europe =

World War 2 propaganda term

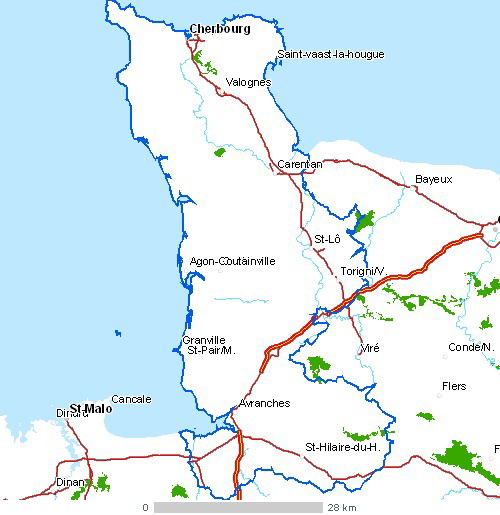
Cotentin Peninsula (Cherbourg peninsula) in Normandy

Fortress Europe (German: Festung Europa) was a coined military propaganda term used by both sides of World War II which referred to the areas of Continental Europe occupied by Nazi Germany, as opposed to the United Kingdom across the Channel, later becoming a pejorative term in relation to European Union migration policy.

== World War II defences ==
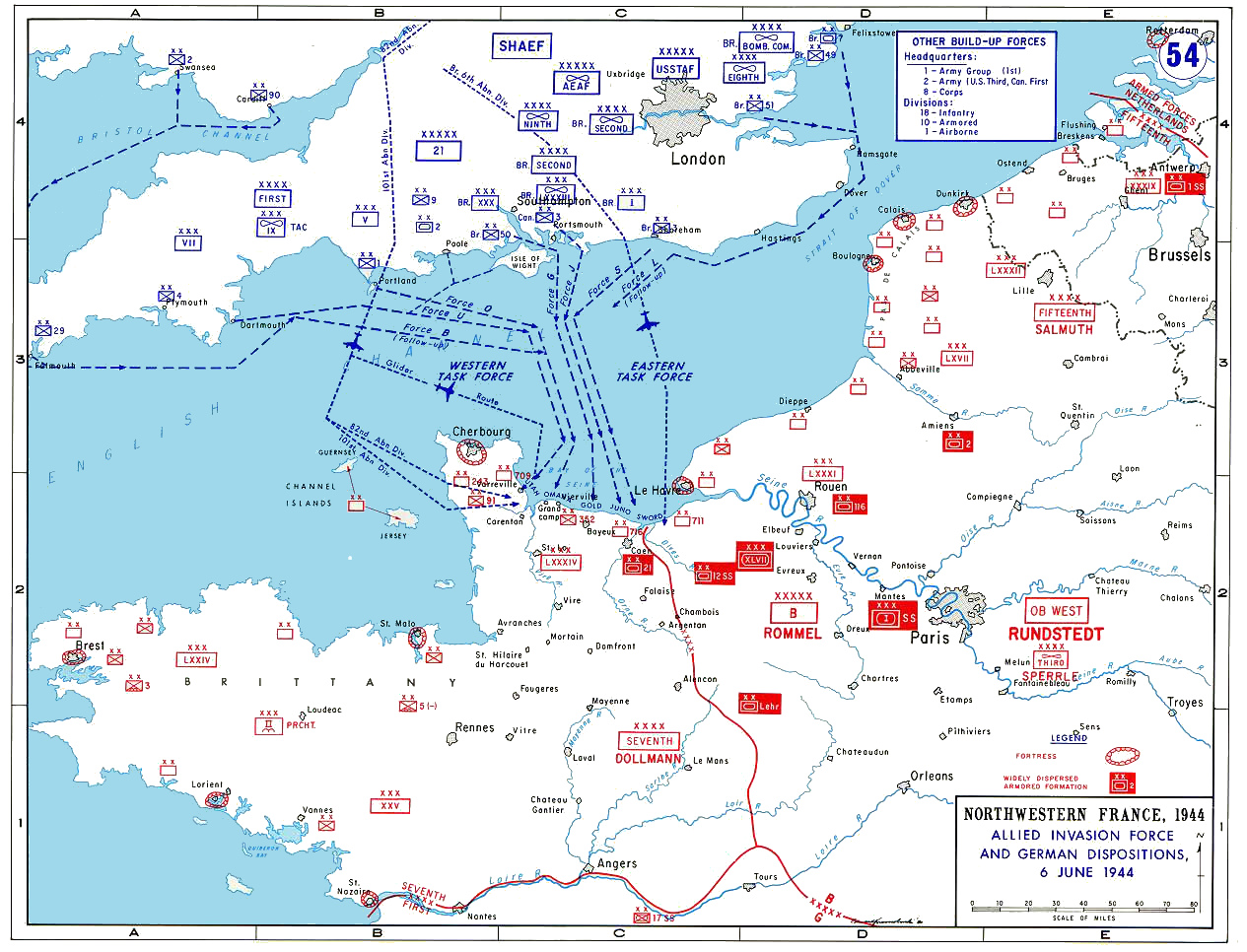
D-Day assault map of Normandy and northwest coastal France

In British phraseology, Fortress Europe meant the battle honour accorded to Royal Air Force and Allied squadrons during the war, but to qualify, operations had to be made by aircraft based in Britain against targets in Germany, Italy, and other parts of German-occupied Europe in the period from the fall of France to the Normandy invasion.

Simultaneously the term Festung Europa was being used in Nazi propaganda, namely to refer to Hitler's and the Wehrmacht's plans to fortify the whole of occupied Europe in order to prevent an invasion by Allied forces. These measures included the construction of the Atlantic wall along with the reorganization of the Luftwaffe for air defence. At the end of 1942 propaganda minister Joseph Goebbels issued instructions to press offices to no longer use the term Fortress Europe due to negative connotations. Fortresses are always prepared for siege and defense – "Europe", on the other hand, was on the offensive. Nevertheless on March 24, 1943, in his speech at the University of Kharkiv, Reichsführer SS Heinrich Himmler used the term “Fortress Europe” three times. This fortress had to be defended again and again against the enemy in the east. In a historical digression Heinrich Himmler went back to the “Mongol invasions” and said that the current war would “not be the last war with Asia”.

This use of Fortress Europe was subsequently adopted by correspondents and historians in the English language to describe the military efforts of the Axis powers to defend the continent from the Allies. For example, George Ward Price wrote at the end of November that the biggest siege in world history was beginning, the “attack against Fortress Europe”.

== Postwar usage ==
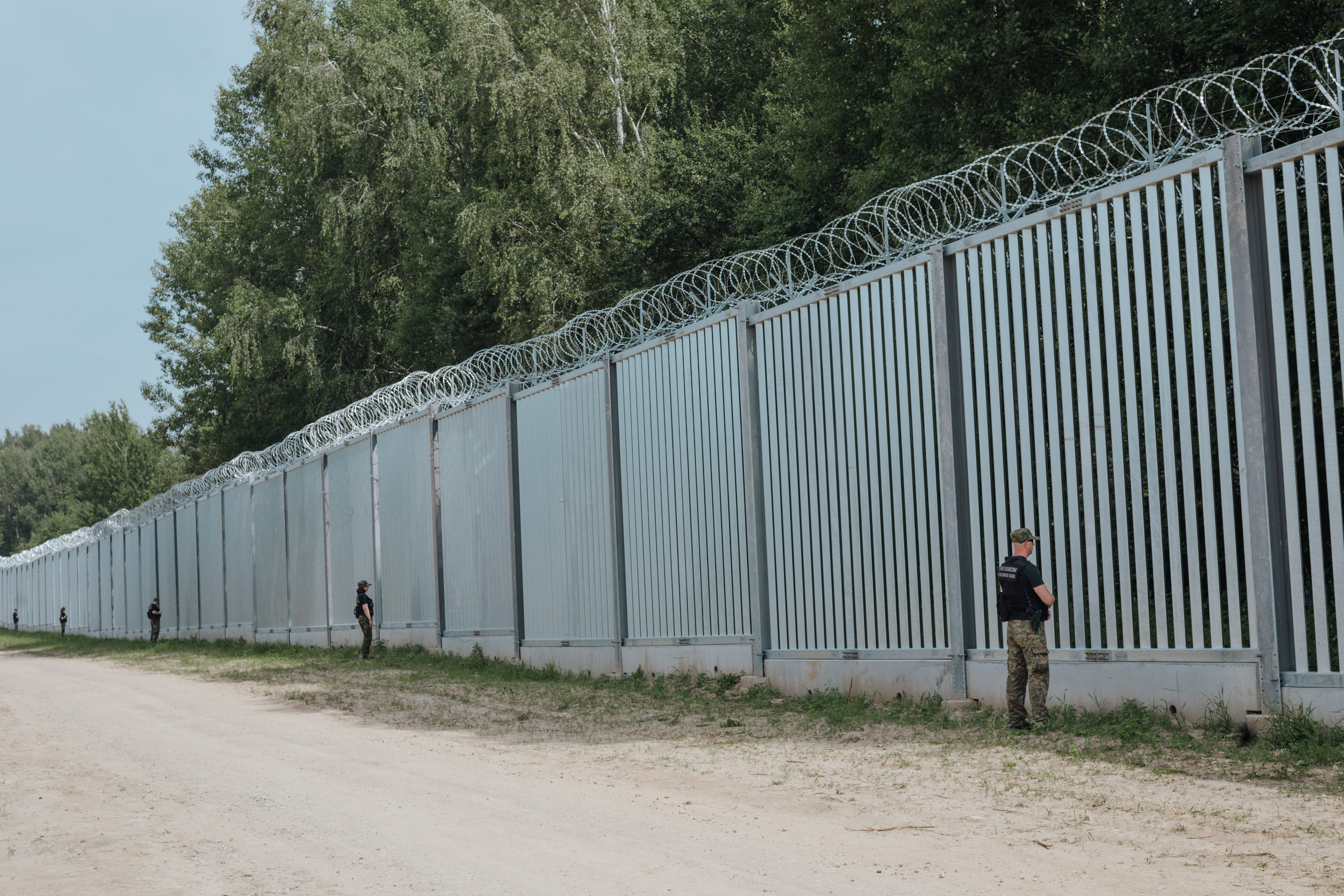
Polish Border Guard officers stationed by the Poland–Belarus border barrier

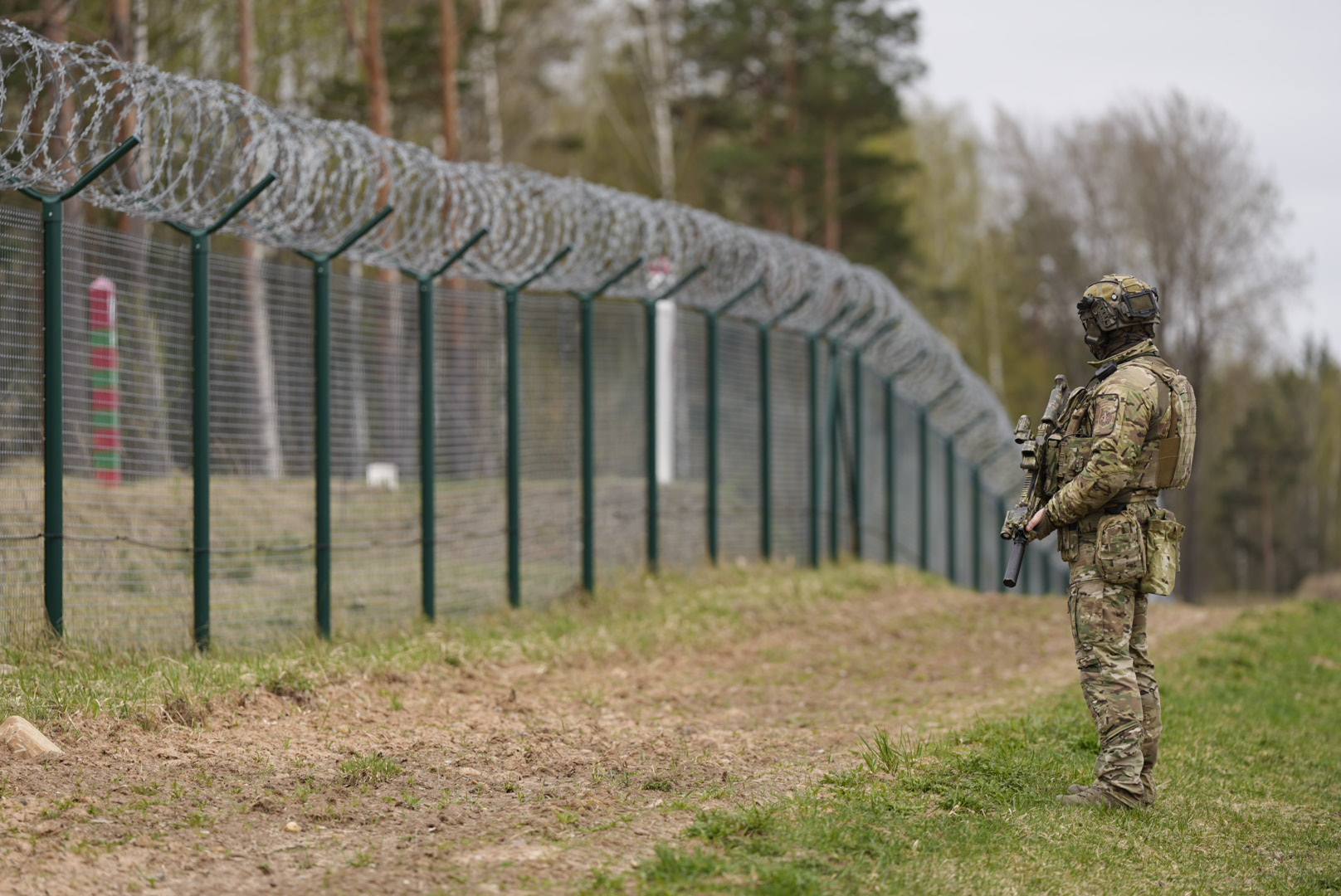
A tall metal fence at the Latvia-Russia border

Currently, within Europe, the term is used either to describe dumping effect of external borders in commercial matters, or as a pejorative description of the state of immigration into the European Union. This can be in reference either to attitudes towards immigration, to border fortification policies pursued for instance in the Spanish North African enclaves of Ceuta and Melilla or to increasing level of externalization of borders that is used to help prevent asylum seekers and other migrants from entering the European Union.

For right-wing and nationalist parties such as the Freedom Party of Austria, 'Fortress Europe' is a positive term. They mostly claim that such a fortress does not really exist yet, and that immigrants can enter Europe far too easily. They often charge the southern states with insufficient border control, claiming that the latter are acting on the knowledge that immigrants tend to be more attracted to western/northern states with more generous welfare systems such as Switzerland, Germany, Austria, and Sweden.

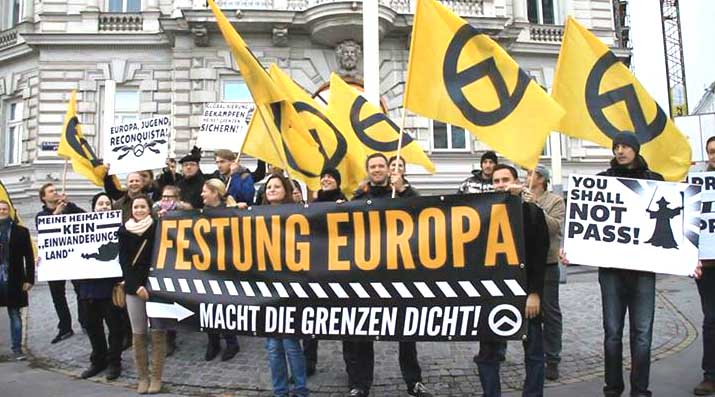
Far-right activists at an Identitarian Movement of Austria rally in Vienna on 10 November 2013

=== Controlled external borders ===
- Ceuta and Melilla (Spain) (from Morocco)
- Italian and Maltese coast (from Libya and Tunisia)
- Canary Islands (Spain) (from Morocco, Western Sahara and Mauritania)
- Maritsa (Greece) (from Turkey)
- Eastern border of the European Union (from Ukraine, Belarus, Moldova, Russia)
- South-Eastern border of the European Union (from Bosnia and Herzegovina, Serbia, Montenegro, Albania, North Macedonia)
- Strait of Gibraltar (from Morocco)
- South Aegean and North Aegean (from Turkey and the Near East)

== See also ==
- Hindenburg Line, German defences on the Western Front of World War I
- Siegfried Line, German defences against France in World War II
- Maginot Line, French defenses against Germany constructed for World War II
- Salpa Line, The last fortified defence line of Finland against the Soviet Union in World War II
- Iron Curtain, dividing line through Europe during the Cold War
