= Border death =

Premature death caused by illegal migration

Border deaths or migrant deaths are deaths that occur during, or afterward as a result of, illegal migration. Although more narrow definitions rely on the physical borders of the state, scholars write that migration policies have broad impacts that extend far beyond these borders as a result of externalization. Consequently, many scholars include deaths in transit countries, or after a person's deportation, and could even include people who die because they are not able to leave their home countries.

Using the narrower definition, the International Organization for Migration has documented at least 63,000 deaths in the decade between 2014 and 2020. The deadliest border region in this time period was the Mediterranean Sea, which accounted for 70 percent of IOM-recorded deaths between 2014 and 2020. The deadliest land border has been the United States–Mexico border. Border deaths are significantly undercounted because many migrants' deaths go unnoticed.

Although typically recorded as natural causes, researchers have identified border deaths as a policy choice resulting from the drivers of migration, a lack of legal pathways, enforcement strategies, and actions by the authorities that endanger migrants' lives.

== Causes ==
Most border deaths have a proximate natural cause, such as drowning or environmental exposure. Researchers emphasize that this does not cover the ultimate causes of death which they typically identify as a policy choice, such as the drivers of migration, a lack of legal pathways, enforcement strategies, and actions by the authorities that endanger migrants' lives. In contrast, states typically blame migrants for causing their own deaths by attempting illegal border crossings. Also taking blame are organized smuggling groups.

In a UN report, Agnes Callamard (special rapporteur on extrajudicial, summary or arbitrary execution) states that "every human being, including those without formal authorization to cross a border, is entitled to the right to life—the most fundamental human right and the basis for all other rights". Callamard criticized state policies that "implicitly or explicitly may tolerate the risk of migrant deaths", for example "purposefully funneling the migration flows into more hazardous terrain".

== Statistics ==

Counting of border deaths began in the 1990s by civil society organizations alarmed by the consequences of European border policy in the Mediterranean Sea. In 2013, the International Organization for Migration (IOM) began to track migrant deaths. Worldwide, the IOM documented more than 63,000 border deaths between 2014 and 2024. The IOM states that "The actual number of migrant deaths and disappearances is likely much higher." Unlike the civil society organizations that were tracking deaths earlier, the IOM does not criticize governments, but seeks to find a balance between the control of irregular migration and reducing deaths.

The deadliest migration route in absolute terms is across the Mediterranean Sea, which made up 70 percent of worldwide deaths known to the IOM between 2014 and 2020.

According to IOM figures, the deadliest land migration route is the United States–Mexico border, with 5,405 deaths between 2014 and 2024. Separately the United States Border Patrol tallied 9,520 deaths between October 1997 and September 2022. This figure does not include cases where the person's body was not recovered, or deaths in Mexico. The Border Patrol figure excludes other migrants as well and is lower than the tallies collected by local authorities. Border deaths are systematically undercounted because "not all who die are found, and because they are systematically under-counted even when they are".

== Opinions ==
Pope Francis condemned border deaths at the beginning of his papacy, criticizing the "indifference" and failure to have a "sense of responsibility for our brothers and sisters".

Vicki Squire writes that "death and vulnerability [in the Mediterranean] have become regular and accepted".

== See also ==
- Migrant deaths along the Mexico–United States border
- Deaths along the Bangladesh–India border
- Escape attempts and victims of the inner German border
  - List of deaths at the Berlin Wall

== Sources ==
- Last, Tamara; Cuttitta, Paolo (2019). Border Deaths: Causes, Dynamics and Consequences of Migration-related Mortality. Amsterdam University Press. ISBN 978-90-485-5020-3.
  - Last, Tamara. "Introduction: A State-of-the-Art Exposition on Border Deaths". In Last & Cuttitta (2019).
  - Gombeer, Kristof; Ulusoy, Orçun; Basilien-Gainche, Marie-Laure. "Understanding the Causes of Border Deaths: A Mapping Exercise". In Last & Cuttitta (2019).
- Squire, Vicki (2020). Europe's Migration Crisis: Border Deaths and Human Dignity. Cambridge University Press. ISBN 978-1-108-83533-6.
