= National Service Training Programme (Malaysia) =

Military service programme in Malaysia (2002–2018, 2023–present)

National Service Training Department
- Jabatan Latihan Khidmat Negara (JLKN)

- Satu Semangat Satu Tekad/One Spirit One Determination (2003-2018); 1 Malaysia 1 PLKN (2009-2018); Kekuatan Melalui PLKN/Strength Through PLKN (2025-sekarang)

Department overview
- Formed: 30 October 2002; 24 years ago
- Dissolved: 13 August 2018; 8 years ago (PLKN program will be reintroduced on 9 October 2023)
- Jurisdiction: Government of Malaysia
- Headquarters: Bangunan Zetro, 2-5, Jalan 9/27c, Wangsa Maju, 53300 Kuala Lumpur.
- Minister responsible: Mohamed Khaled Nordin, Minister of Defence
- Deputy Minister responsible: Adly Zahari, Deputy Minister of Defence
- Parent department: Ministry of Defence (MINDEF)
- Website: plkn.mod.gov.my

The National Service Training Programme, or Program Latihan Khidmat Negara (PLKN), known locally as the Khidmat Negara ("National Service") was Malaysia's national service program under the Barisan Nasional (BN) government. The programme was handled by the National Service Training Department, or Jabatan Latihan Khidmat Negara (JLKN) under the Minister of Defence (MINDEF). The conscripts are 18-year-old youths that are selectively drafted. The three-month program, which started in December 2003, began as way to encourage friendship between youths of certain ages from different races and ethnic groups and address concerns that the country's multi-ethnic and multi-cultural groups who were seen of "becoming increasingly isolated from one another".

The program was halted for one year in 2015 due to the federal government's efforts to cut spending. The program was reintroduced as PLKN 2.0 in 2016, with participation to be made fully optional by 2019.

On 13 August 2018, Youth and Sports Minister Syed Saddiq Syed Abdul Rahman of the new federal government under Pakatan Harapan (PH) announced that the PLKN and National Civics Bureau (BTN) programmes were abolished, as he claimed they were being used for racial indoctrination.

== History ==
The national service program, first proposed in late 2002, came to committee the following year, and was finally implemented in 2004. Initial proposals envisaged drafting all youths of a certain age, but later lack of resources led to restricting the numbers of the intake. The program, planned around a two-year program, was later reduced to a year, then to six months, and then to three months.

=== Abolishment ===
On 13 August 2018, Syed Saddiq Syed Abdul Rahman, the Youth and Sports Minister of Malaysia announced that the National Service Training Programme will be abolished with immediate effect following a series of discussion in the cabinet meetings.

The decision was made in view of PLKN and BTN been misused by certain parties for misguided indoctrination. He also announced plans to draft a replacement programme that would focus on shaping visionary youths, which will also be in line with the Federal Constitution and Rukun Negara.

=== Revival ===
On 9 October 2023, Defence Minister Mohamad Hasan announced in parliament that the National Service would be revived, albeit at a renewed and downscaled structure. The changes include a downsizing of the number of camps throughout the country to the existing 13 army camps and one police camp, a different training scheme with a three-phase process and a lower expenditure for the program. Mohamad said that the paperwork for the revival will need to be completed and presented to the National Security Council for approval. In October 2024, it will be launched as National Service Training Programme (PLKN) 3.0 as a pilot program set to be done by June or July 2025.

After various studies and public reactions regarding the re-establishment of the national service, the new Minister of Defence Mohamed Khaled Nordin finally announced that the PLKN had been activated and the trial session began on 12 January 2025 with age 18 to 25 years, to be carried out in stages until June of the same year by maintaining a percentage of 70 percent military training and 30 percent national module and inviting SPM graduates who have previously joined the school uniformed cadets. By January 2025, around 150 volunteers were registered for the program.

== Selection of conscripts ==
In late December 2003, the names of 85,000 conscripts for the first National Service program was made public. The government announced that these youths were randomly selected out of the roughly 450,000 youths born in 1986, through a computerised process. Conscripts are 18 years of age and picked from a national database that includes all citizens registered with a Malaysian ID card, whether born locally or overseas. Conscripts were informed of their participation in the program by mail at the address listed on their identification card. They are also able to check their status on the program's website, or by SMS. Lists of conscripts names and ID numbers are also published in major newspapers.

Deserters and draft dodgers are subject to punishment of a fine of up to but not exceeding RM 3000, and/or up to six months of jail. Deferrals to a later date are allowed. Exclusion from the program requires that the conscript fall under one of the following ten categories:

- Insanity
- Physically disabled
- Being held under preventive detention (such as the Internal Security Act)
- Undergoing drug rehabilitation
- Detained by the Children's Act of 2001 (Act 612)
- Fatal disease or condition, as confirmed by a medical officer.
- Contagious disease, as confirmed by a medical officer.
- Full-time member or full-time trainee of the Malaysian Armed Forces, Royal Malaysian Police, Malaysian Fire and Rescue Department, Malaysian Maritime Enforcement Agency or Prisons Department of Malaysia.
- Pregnant women

Non selected civilians are also allowed to volunteer to enter the program after filling out certain forms in camps. During the first year pilot of the program, three teens from the north, Lee Poa Ting, Nyiau Kean Wei, and Goh Liang Kia expressed disappointment for not being drafted, gaining widespread attention and becoming national news. Since then, a voluntary option to participate was implemented.

=== Objectives ===
- Develop a young generation who are patriotic and with love and devotion for their country
- Enhance unity among the multi-racial communities in the country
- Instill a spirit of caring and volunteerism among society
- Produce an active, intelligent and confident generation
- Develop positive characteristics among the younger generation through good values
- Develop a generation that is obedient and loyal to the government

=== Identity ===
The program has its own theme song and logo. Conscripts are issued two pairs each of three different types of uniforms: a class uniform, a sports uniform, and a combat uniform. The combat uniform's design is of blue camouflage stripes, made out of light blue, dark blue, white, and black. The general color scheme for the class and sports uniforms is blue, and black. Criticisms against trainees' uniforms are apparent as blue clothes are easily spotted in jungles and verdant vegetation areas except the sky and water.

=== Ranks in the National Service ===
Conscripts exhibiting promising leadership capabilities are promoted to rank-holders during the early course of the training. These rank-holders are entrusted with military officer-like responsibilities and authorisations throughout the remaining course of the training. The ranking system however differs slightly among camps throughout the country according to each camp commandant.

Among the ranks available are:

- Chief: Leader of all conscripts in camp. 4 stripes
- Deputy Chief: Assistant to the Chief, usually 2–3 per camp. 3 stripes
- Company Commander (CC): Also known as Squad OC (Officer-in-Command), leader of a company. Usually 1 per gender for each company. 2 stripes
- Assistant Company Commander (ACC): Also known as Company Sergeant, assistant to the CC. Usually 1–2 to each CC. 1 stripes

Other ranks (varies from camp to camp, not all camps have the following officers):

- Public Relations Officer: Normally one for each camp.
- Religious Affairs Officer: Normally one for every major religion in the camp.
- Quarter Master: Normally one for each camp.
- Sports and Recreation Officer: Normally one for each camp.
- Dorm Administrator: One for each dorm.
- Logistics Personnel: One for each camp, as liaison between conscripts and the camp logistics department.

=== Modules ===
The program is split into four modules:

- Physical Module (Fizikal) – Marching (Kawad), hand-to-hand combat (Tempur Tanpa Senjata, largely similar to taekwondo), Colt M16 usage, obstacle courses (Kembara Halangan), abseiling (Tali Tinggi), Flying Fox, canoeing (Kayak), camping ("Wirajaya") (During Wirajaya, trainees will be also given mock missions such as: Search and rescue, night patrols, perimeter Guard, first aid and at night trainees have to guard their company flag from being stolen by instructors of other companies who would infiltrate their opponent companies' bases) Navigation (Navigasi), survival training and first aid training.
- Nation Building Module (Kenegaraan) – Classroom based. Nation's history, sovereignty and dignity, Malaysia and international affairs, Defence and National Security and Citizen's responsibility to the nation, and loyalty towards the current government, Barisan Nasional. The classes are based on group based training (Latihan Dalam Kumpulan).
- Character Building Module (Pembinaan Karakter) – Classroom based. It comprises 2 modules. The first one, Module A speaks about Bringing Out The Best In Me while the second module, Module B, relates to Bringing Out The Best In Others. This component is experential based and relies on games and activities as the means of teaching. It is about instilling good values and Self-confidence, leadership and self-evaluation.
- Community Service Module (Khidmat Komuniti) – Trainees are sent in groups to places in surrounding areas to give the trainees a chance to serve society. This is about building and restoring public amenities. It also teaches them environmental restoration and protection as well.

In the 2004 program, conscripts (referred to as "trainees" or "Wira" for boys and "Wirawati" for girls) spent 2 months in physical training camp, followed by a final month in a university setting. The program consisted of three separate, overlapping batches. The first batch of 24,000 began in mid-February and ended in the beginning of May, while the second and third batches began in March and ended in June. Trainees were divided among 79 training camps scattered all over the country. Each camp was supposed to contain a good mix of youth from different ethnic groups and locations.

=== Budget and spending ===
Trainees were initially given a RM300 allowance by the government. Beginning in January 2008, this amount was raised to RM150/month, or RM450 total. Trainee allowances come in the form of a Sijil Simpanan Premium (Premium Savings Certificate) from Bank Simpanan Nasional, or an account with Agro Bank Malaysia. The accounts with Agro Bank Malaysia have been criticised for taking out RM 20 from each account, for processing and ATM card fees.

According to then-Deputy Defence Minister Datuk Wira Abu Seman Yusop, RM2.37bil has been spent to finance the National Service program since it was introduced in 2004. RM608.6mil was spent in 2004, RM604.8mil in 2005, RM588.2mil in 2006 and RM565mil in 2007. Then-former Defence Minister Datuk Seri Najib Tun Razak had said earlier that the programme would not exceed RM500mil a year.

Year	Budget (RM)
Total (as of 2008)	RM2.37 bil
2008	TBA
2007	565.0 mil
2006	588.2 mil
2005	604.8 mil
2004	608.6 mil

== List of National Service Training Camps ==
There are many National Service training camps in every state in Malaysia. The camps are not available in the Federal Territories of Kuala Lumpur, Labuan and Putrajaya.

Initially, the program involved a two-month placement in a rural outdoor camp, followed by one month in an urban setting (a university, or sport facility). Following university complaints of vandalism, the urban setting placement was discontinued after the 2004 program. The canvas tents in the outdoor camps that housed 10 trainees each were replaced with concrete dormitories that housed 20 trainees each. Trainees are now housed at only one location throughout the duration of the program.

State	Location	Camp
Johor	Mersing	Pusat Bina Semangat YPJ
Johor	Mersing	Kem Rekreasi Pertanian Teluk Sari
Johor	Pagoh	Nasuha Camp
Johor	Desaru	Kem Desaru Gerak Khas
Johor	Batu Pahat	Semberong Camp
Johor	Kluang	Kem PLKN Pth Padang Hijau
Johor	Tangkak	PLKN Kem Sri Ledang
Kedah	Langkawi	Beringin Beach Resort Camp
Kedah	Sik	Rimba Taqwa Camp
Kedah	Kuala Nerang	Dusun Resort Camp
Kedah	Kulim	PLKN Bukit Besar Camp
Kedah	Merbok	Damai Park Resort Camp
Kedah	Sintok	PLKN Universiti Utara Malaysia Sintok Camp
Kedah	Baling	Kem Rekreasi Belia
Kedah	Langkawi	Kem Lagenda Seri Negeri
Kedah	Kubang Pasu	Sri Kandi Camp
Kedah	Kubang Pasu	Gardenia Camp
Kedah	Kubang Pasu	D' Jelapang Camp
Kelantan	Pasir Puteh	Kisana Beach Resort Camp
Kelantan	Gua Musang	Etnobotani Training Camp
Kelantan	Pasir Mas	Cancun Park Camp
Kelantan	Kuala Krai	Batu Jong Training Camp
Melaka	Masjid Tanah	Warisan Camp
Melaka	Ayer Keroh	Ayer Keroh Recreational Park Camp
Melaka	Pekan Asahan, Jasin	Kem Lagenda Gunung Ledang, Asahan
Melaka	Alor Gajah	Kem PLKN Putra-Putri
Negeri Sembilan	Jempol	De Bana Camp
Negeri Sembilan	Rembau	Ulu Pari Camp
Negeri Sembilan	Port Dickson	PDS Resort Camp
Negeri Sembilan	Kuala Pilah	Karisma Camp
Negeri Sembilan	Mantin	Seri Perkasa Camp
Negeri Sembilan	Rembau	Titian Bintagor
Negeri Sembilan	Tanjung Tuan	Rachado Bay Camp
Pahang	Raub	Benum Hill Resort Camp
Pahang	Bandar Muadzam Shah	Pinggiran Pelangi Camp
Pahang	Kuala Rompin	Summerset Resort Camp
Pahang	Lake Chini	Lake Chini Resort Camp
Pahang	Gambang	Gambang Camp (Agro Resort Sungai Semuji)
Pahang	Cherating	Kem Cahaya Gemilang
Pahang	Pekan	Semarak Camp
Pahang	Bentong	Chamang Camp
Pahang	Maran	Indera Pahlawan Camp
Penang	Sungai Bakap	Sri Impian Camp
Penang	Balik Pulau	Kem PLKN White Resort
Penang	Balik Pulau	Kem PLKN Sri Mutiara
Penang	Bukit Mertajam	Syruz Camp
Perak	Manjung	Kem Akademi Kepimpinan Segari
Perak	Ayer Tawar	PLKN Kem Kg Baharu (De Air' Resort)
Perak	Sungai Siput	Terkok Camp
Perak	Lumut	Teluk Rubiah Camp
Perak	Gopeng	Kem Taman Kepimpinan Gemilang
Perak	Sungkai	Kem Sinaran Suria
Perak	Selama	Tegas Mesra Camp
Perak	Chenderiang	Sentosa Camp
Perak	Gunung Semanggol	Jiwa Murni Camp
Perlis	Wang Kelian	Tasik Meranti Camp
Perlis	Beseri	Tasoh Camp
Perlis	Padang Besar	Guar Chenderai Camp
Sabah	Sandakan	Bagai Budi Resort Camp
Sabah	Tuaran	KK Dibawah Bayu Camp
Sabah	Sipitang	Kubena Camp
Sabah	Papar	Ovai Wawasan Camp
Sabah	Tawau	San Shui Camp
Sabah	Kota Belud	Sinar Jaya Camp
Sabah	Tambunan	Tanaki Camp
Sarawak	Betong	Bukit Saban Resort Camp
Sarawak	Miri	Miri Camp, Batang Rait
Sarawak	Sibu	Junaco Park Camp
Sarawak	Bintulu	Similajau Camp
Sarawak	Serian	Juara Camp
Sarawak	Sematan	Putra Sentosa Camp
Sarawak	Sibu	Bumimas Camp
Sarawak	Bau	Puncak Permai Camp
Selangor	Kuala Langat	Paya Indah Camp
Selangor	Kuala Kubu Bharu	Kem Bina Semangat, Kem Pelangi Hill Resort
Selangor	Rawang	Temasya Rimba Templer, Templer Park
Selangor	Sepang	PLKN Princess Haliza Camp
Selangor	Beranang	Millennium Camp
Selangor	Banting	Jugra Banting Camp
Selangor	Behrang	Geo Cosmo Camp
Selangor	Semenyih	PLKN Setia Ikhlas Camp
Terengganu	Setiu	Merang Suria Holiday Camp
Terengganu	Setiu	Kem Peladang Setiu Agro Resort
Terengganu	Kemaman	Cheneh Cemerlang Training Camp
Terengganu	Kerteh	Bakau Resort Camp

== Deployment ==
The program was staggered into several batches (kumpulan) over the year. Collectively, all batches in a year are known as a series. Batches are known as "Batch X, Series Y". For example, the pilot batch in the pilot series would be referred to as Batch 1 Series 1, while the second batch in the fifth year (2008) series would be Batch 2 Series 5.

In the 2007 program, 100,000 people were selected out of the country's youths born in 1989. They were placed in 79 training camps, in three different batches. Each batch underwent three months of training. However, the 2007 batches did not overlap, as with the previous year's. Instead, the three batches spanned a total of nine months. Training of the first batch started on 1 January 2007 and ended at 11 March 2007. There were delays for trainees from the East Coast due to severe flooding in the region.

Including 2008, a total of 339,186 youths have been assigned to National Service since beginning in 2004. The program was run by Jabatan Latihan Khidmat Negara (JLKN) or National Service Department, a department under the Malaysian Ministry of Defence.

== Criticism ==
Despite progress towards ethnic harmony made in Malaysia in recent times it is clear that there are still problems. Outside the Human Rights Charter Contraventions, other problems are also as follows:

After the 2004 pilot batch completed its National Service, the youth wing of the Malaysian Chinese Association, Malaysia's largest ethnic Chinese party), on behalf of themselves and 8 other Chinese-based youth organisations, issued a memorandum to the National Service Training Council calling for more non-Malay trainers. They also criticised the lack of counsellors, imbalanced diet for the participants, poor communication among the various secretariats and no code of conduct for camp commandants or directors, trainers, facilitators and supervisors.

Other main controversy issues of Malaysian National Service include the selection system where the government computer database system picks up the trainees randomly without even knowing about their social status. Some cases include poor teenagers who need to work for their living and young mothers with newborn babies who were selected for the program, which are considered as inhumane. However, selected trainees with extraneous circumstances can send a letter of appeal to be exempted from the training, which will usually be approved.

In 2005, concerns were raised in Parliament that youth were being taught to use firearms, namely M16 rifles, in National Service. Then Deputy Prime Minister, Najib Razak, stated that this was merely a pilot project. However, a Democratic Action Party Member of Parliament (MP) claimed that the Parliamentary Select Committee on Unity and National Service had not been informed of the project. The firearms module is now a module of the program.

Trainees are required to submit a health status declaration form but are not required to seek qualified medical opinion in completing this declaration (unlike, for example, United States Space Camp which requires qualified medical certification of health status). Trainees are required to complete a medical checkup before entering the program, which is provided for free at major government clinics. This medical checkup, however, is not reinforced.

=== Official reception ===
The program has been plagued with claims of poor management right from its inception. There have been a total of 16 trainee deaths.

When pressured by more calls to suspend the program because of a 16th death, Najib responded that it was not feasible to stop the program since "many parties are involved".

== Major incidents ==
=== 2005 ===
- Food poisoning, PDS Resort Camp, Port Dickson, Negri Sembilan, on 16 May. 60 trainees and instructors at Pusat Latihan Khidmat Negara, Port Dickson Camp, Negeri Sembilan.

=== 2007 ===
- Lost in jungle, Kem Lagenda Gunung Ledang, Jasin, Malacca, on 30 April. Twenty-three lost their way during a jungle trekking exercise at Asahan Forest Reserve. The instructor in charge of the group was dismissed with immediate effect for negligence.

=== 2008 ===
- High fever, Kem Desaru Gerak Khas, Kota Tinggi, Johor, on 31 May. 58 trainees came down with vomiting and high fever on 31 May, and were admitted to Kota Tinggi Hospital. The incident began when trainees began to fall sick after returning to camp on 28 May, from the Wirajaya module (a two-day jungle trekking exercise).
- Food poisoning, Kem Barracuda, Setiu Agro, Terrenganu, on 23 May. Nine trainees fell ill due to food poisoning, with four trainees being warded at Setiu Hospital. The camp's canteen was closed down.
- Food poisoning, Kem Barracuda, Setiu Agro, Terengganu, on 29 May. 67 trainees developed stomachaches believed to be caused by food poisoning on 28 May, barely a week after nine trainees from the same camp suffered the same ailment. Fourteen trainees were warded in the Setiu Hospital, while 53 received outpatient treatment. Four food handlers at the camp also received outpatient treatments at the same hospital. The food was catered from outside, as the camp's canteen had been closed after the 23 May incident when four of the trainees were warded for food poisoning.

=== 2009 ===
- An 18-year-old ethnic Chinese trainee was alleged to have been sexually assaulted by more than 20 unidentified men at Lake Chini Resort Camp, Lake Chini, Pahang, on 23 June while making a call from a phone booth on camp grounds at night. Accompanied by her father, the trainee lodged a police report and underwent a medical check-up the next day and did not return to camp. As of one week later, camp authorities were purportedly pressuring the trainee to return to training.
- A racial brawl involving almost 100 trainees occurred in the canteen of Lake Chini Resort Camp, Lake Chini, Pahang, on 27 June following a misunderstanding arising from trainees "inadvertently [shoving] into each other" while rearranging chairs. Following this incident, 17 trainees were arrested by police and held at Pekan district police lock-up for two days before being released after meeting their parents.

=== 2011 ===
- Harassment, Sri Impian Camp, Sungai Bakap, Penang, in mid January. A Sikh youth woke up discovering his hair was cut by 50 to 60 cm while he was asleep in his dormitory. The incident traumatised the youth because it violated his religious rights (kesh). It is under probe ordered by the Defence Ministry.

=== 2013 ===
- Poor food and damaged facilities, a group of NS trainees from the White Resort camp, Balik Pulau, Penang, protested and threatened to leave the camp over unbearable conditions of the camp such as insufficient food, dirty pillows, clogged sinks and toilets, broken bed frames and broken toilet doors. One of the NS trainees found worms in the food served at the camp.

== Trainee fatalities ==
=== 2005 ===
- S. Theresa Pauline, 17, attached to Kem Karisma, Kuala Pilah, Negeri Sembilan. Died on 11 June after being admitted to the hospital on 23 May due to having fits. Her death was attributed to viral meningoencephalitis. Her father, S. Sarimuthu was paid RM 32,000.

=== 2007 ===
- Ili Ameera Azlan, 17, attached to Kem Ayer Keroh, Ayer Keroh, Melaka. Died on 18 January at Malacca Hospital, after suffering breathing difficulties. The parents were paid RM 35,000.
- Prema Elenchelian, 18, attached to Kem Kisana Beach Resort, Pasir Puteh, Kelantan. The trainee from Kajang, Selangor, was found unconscious in a toilet at Jeram Linang (0230 hours) on 1 March. She was taken to the Tengku Anis Hospital where she was pronounced dead. Prema's death brought the number of trainees who have died since the programme began in 2004 to 12.
- Mohd Rafi Ameer, 18, attached to Cheneh Cemerlang Camp, Kemaman, Pahang. Died at 10.30pm on 3 September, after having fever for 1 week. Rafi had previously called his sister and told her that he had a fever, and that his leg had been swollen for nearly a week after he fell during training.

=== 2008 ===
- Too Hui Min, 18, attached to Kem Geo Kosmo, Behrang, Selangor. Died on 7 May at Slim River Hospital, Perak, three days after she started complaining of constipation. The cause of death was later determined as being toxic megacolon – her colon had been swollen and the lining had thinned due to septicaemia. Her death was the 16th National Service death, and was followed by several DAP leaders calling for the suspension or even the scrapping of the National Service programme.
- Afiq Zuhairi Ahmat Rozali, 18, attached to Kem Sentosa, Chenderiang, Perak. Died on 16 April at Teluk Intan Hospital, Perak, after a brief febrile illness. He was treated by camp paramedics several times before finally being transferred to hospital where he died in less than 24 hours.

=== 2009 ===
- Abdul Malik Ishak, 18, attached to Kem Guar Chenderai, Padang Besar, Perlis. Found dead in his bed on 29 June, at Kem Guar Chenderai. He had not reported any problems on his self-reported health declaration form.

=== 2011 ===
- 2 illness-caused deaths 1 coma
- A Sarawakian trainee collapsed and died in a hospital.

=== 2012 ===
- 1 death

=== 2013 ===
- Muhammad Suhaimi Norhamidi, 18, was bludgeoned to death by a blunt object by fellow trainees for allegedly cutting queue during breakfast at the National Service camp in Muadzam Shah, Pahang on 22 September 2013. Police have arrested three other trainees aged 17 to 21.

=== Deaths ===
There have been 22 deaths since the programme started in 2004, with 12 trainees dying in the camps and five more during breaks or within days of completing the program.

== In popular culture ==
There have been television programs or documentaries showcasing PLKN since its establishment over 20 years ago, which includes:

- 3R Season 1, a program about women that aired on Astro Ria (before its name change to TV3) in 2004
- Platun Satria, a Malay telemovie which aired on TV3 in 2009 starring Nabila Huda and Ryzal Jaafar
- Mulanya Di Sini episode 20, a story about youth who train under PLKN in Penang, which aired on RTM in 2011 and starred Meyra Liyana, Farid Wari and Zain Saidin
