= Kevin Nyiau =

Malaysian writer

Chinese name
- Traditional Chinese: 楊建偉
- Simplified Chinese: 杨建伟
- Hanyu Pinyin: Yáng Jiànwěi
- Jyutping: Joeng4 Gin3 Wai5
- Hokkien POJ: Iôⁿ Kiàn-úi
- Tâi-lô: Iônn Kiàn-uí

Kevin Nyiau also known as Nyiau Kean Wei, Yang Jian Wei (Chinese: 楊建偉; pinyin: Yáng Jiànwěi; Jyutping: Joeng4 Gin3 Wai5; Pe̍h-ōe-jī: Iôⁿ Kiàn-úi) is a Malaysian author born in Sungai Petani in 1986.

== Life ==
Nyiau is a Malaysian Chinese who spent his childhood in Sungai Petani, Kedah state in Northern Malaysia. He received some national fame as a 17-year-old who contacted the Malaysian Ministry of Defence after not being drafted for mandatory military service on a lottery selection system. Unlike others who generally consider it lucky to avoid, Nyiau appealed to the National Service Training Program to enlist him anyway. He and two other teens received attention for actually volunteering to participate. Nyiau later moved to Kuala Lumpur and began a career in the banking industry. Unsatisfied with the direction of his life, he decided to alter his projected path and spent a year abroad in New Zealand and Australia through the working holiday visa program, inspiring his first book Hope is at the Turning Point. Kevin Nyiau later moved to Phnom Penh, Cambodia where he continues to write and blog about his observations on life in different environments.

== Career ==
Nyiau has had a diverse career, working in the entertainment industry as an actor, a model, a singer and as a contestant on Malaysian national talent competitions. He spent two years in the banking industry before leaving for New Zealand and Australia where he did everything from picking zucchinis, coordinating Japanese animation expos, to collecting marine mammal and flora data in the deep sea.

His first book, Hope is at The Turning Point (希望在转角), was published in 2016 by 三三出版社 press. It is in part, a travel journal, in part a subtle struggle to change the course of life with undertones of refusing to accept thoughts of suicide that begin the chronicle. At this point in time, Hope is at the Turning Point is only available in Chinese.

Nyiau has spoken at book events in Malaysia and produced two recordings included with the book titled 无所谓 and I'm Afraid. He also partnered with Befrienders Worldwide Penang, an emotional support network for people experiencing feelings of distress or despair, including those which may lead to suicide, to feature their Suicide Prevention Campaign at the end of his book.

== Works ==
- Hope is at the Turning Point (希望在转角) (2016)
