= Protests at the UNHCR humanitarian center in Agadez =

2024–2025 refugee protests in Niger

Protests at the Agadez Humanitarian Center
- Date: 22 September 2024 – ongoing
- Location: Agadez, Niger
- Caused by: Prolonged detention of refugees and asylum seekers, poor humanitarian conditions, lack of resettlement or integration opportunities
- Goals: Resettlement to third countries; improved living conditions; end of rights abuses
- Methods: Sit-ins, hunger strikes, petitions, open letters

Casualties
- Arrested: 8 refugee representatives (March 2025)

A series of peaceful demonstrations by refugees and asylum seekers are held at the UNHCR-managed humanitarian center in Agadez, Niger, beginning on 22 September 2024. The protests were organized by residents of the camp, primarily refugees from Sudan, Chad, Eritrea, and other conflict zones. The protesters are calling for dignified living conditions, resettlement, medical care, and an end to what they described as "de facto detention" under international supervision.

== Background ==
Since 2017, Niger has served as a key partner in the European Union's externalization of asylum, hosting migrants and refugees evacuated from Libya through the Emergency Transit Mechanism (ETM) managed by UNHCR, in response to the well-documented torture and sexual exploitation of asylum seekers in Libya. Thousands of people were accommodated at camps in Agadez, where harsh climatic conditions, limited healthcare, and insufficient food supply became chronic issues. Many residents had fled Libyan detention centres or armed conflicts in Sudan and Chad, hoping for resettlement in Europe or safe third countries.

By late 2024, many refugees had been trapped for over six years with little clarity about their legal status or resettlement prospects. They accused UNHCR and partner organizations of mishandling their asylum claims and using food restrictions and intimidation to suppress dissent.

== 2024–2025 protests ==
On 22 September 2024, refugees at the Agadez Humanitarian Center began a peaceful sit-in demanding "a dignified life, justice, and a future for our children". Protesters cited medical neglect, food scarcity, and psychological trauma resulting from prolonged confinement in desert conditions. They declared the camp "a slow killer" and held daily demonstrations inside the center and in front of the UNHCR office.

UNHCR and local security forces responded to the growing unrest by imposing restrictions and arresting eight protest representatives - four men and four women - on 25 March 2025. They were detained for ten days before being released on 4 April 2025. Later, Nigerien authorities revoked their refugee status, a decision that UNHCR was aware of but did not intervene to stop. According to camp residents, six refugees died during the protests due to lack of medical care.

As of November 2025, the protests have been ongoing for over 400 consecutive days, making them one of the longest-running refugee-led demonstrations in North Africa. Despite repeated appeals to the UN, EU, and African Union, no substantive solution or humanitarian improvement was recorded.

== Previous incidents ==
The 2024–2025 protests followed earlier episodes of unrest at the same site. In December 2019 and January 2020, peaceful demonstrations by approximately 1,000 Sudanese refugees at the UNHCR office in Agadez were violently dispersed by Nigerien authorities. Over 300 refugees were arrested, and parts of the camp were set on fire following the crackdown. The protests were widely interpreted as responses to European migration policies outsourcing asylum processing to Niger, effectively turning the country into a containment zone for African migrants.

== Humanitarian conditions ==
Reports from refugees and NGOs describe the center as severely under-resourced. Food supplies were reportedly suspended for protesters, and several refugees died from preventable illnesses aggravated by malnutrition and lack of medical treatment. Refugees describe feeling "forgotten by the world", urging the international community to intervene and denouncing the complicity of Western governments in policies that confine them to desert isolation.

== International reactions ==
The protests have drawn condemnation and concern from regional and international human rights organizations. Activist networks such as Alarme Phone Sahara and Refugees in Libya have circulated testimonies, photographs, and petitions documenting abuses and calling for an independent investigation. Critics argue that UNHCR's operations in Agadez have shifted from refugee protection to migration deterrence in line with EU border externalization policies.
