= Detention centres in Libya =

Criminal enterprises run for profit in Libya

Detention centers in Libya
- Part of Libyan Crisis (2011-present) and the European migrant crisis
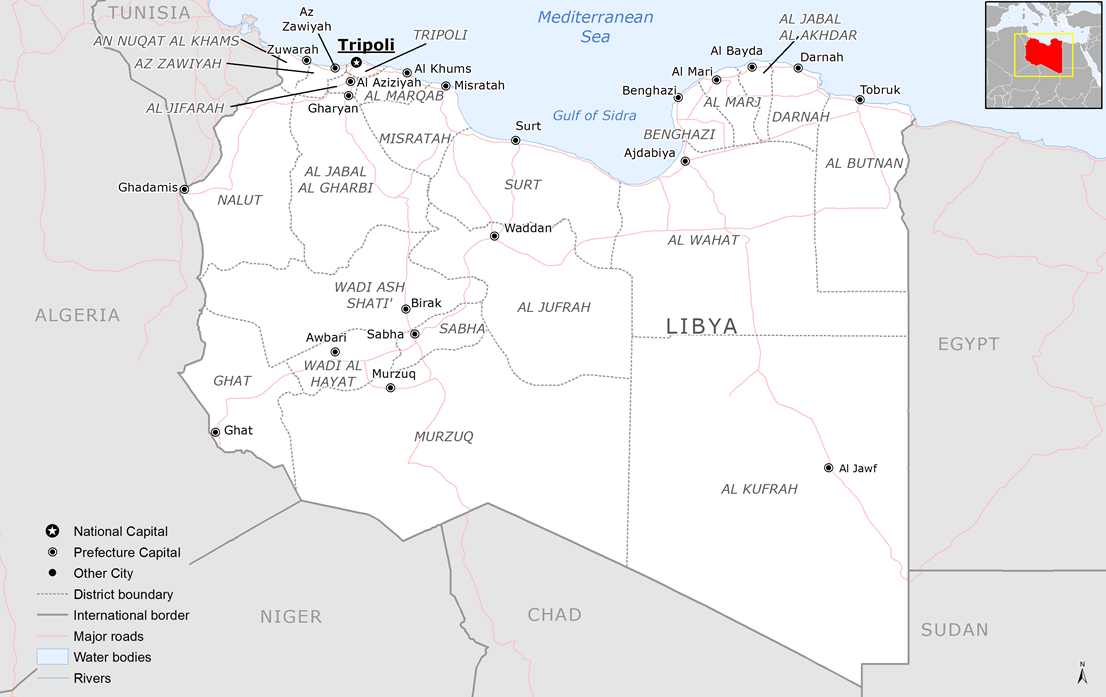
- Map of Libya
- Location: Libya
- Organized by: Islamist militias, smuggling gangs, Libyan Coast Guard
- Migrants in Libya: 700,000 (2018)
- Migrants in detention: 5,000 (2021)

Detention centres in Libya are criminal enterprises run by gangs of human traffickers and kidnappers for profit. Lawlessness in Libya has resulted in circumstances where criminals gangs abduct and detain people who are migrating to or through Libya. 5,000 migrants are held in dozens of camps that are mostly located around Bani Walid. Detainees often suffer torture and may face execution if their family do not pay ransoms to the gangs.

European governments who reject asylum seekers arriving by boat create circumstances where people are vulnerable to the activities of the gangs who run the detention centres. The detention centres have been publicly condemned by Pope Francis and Médecins Sans Frontières. Criticisms of the centres were contained in leaked documents from the German government. The United Nations Security Council called upon the Libyan authorities to close the centres in 2022.

== Background ==
=== Libya as a destination and transit country for African migrants ===
Libya, rich in natural resources—particularly oil—with one of the highest GDPs per capita on the continent and a low population density, became an attractive destination for migrants from sub-Saharan Africa during the 1990s. Immigration into the country was relatively easy for nationals from the Maghreb, the Mashriq, and sub-Saharan Africa, as they did not require a visa to enter. It is estimated that around 1.5 million migrants were present in Libya during the 2000s.

Over the same decade, the country also became a major transit point toward Europe via the Central Mediterranean route. The 2011 Libyan revolution, the subsequent political chaos, and the explosion of migratory flows from Africa beginning in 2013 would later make the country the primary point of departure for migrants heading toward the Italian coast.

In 2024, Libyan authorities stated that 2.5 million migrants—of whom 70% to %80% were estimated to be in an irregular situation—were present in the country, which has a population of about 7 million inhabitants. The International Organization for Migration (IOM), for its part, estimated the number of migrants to exceed 706,000 people. That same year, more than 200,000 migrants crossed the Mediterranean from North African shores.

=== Under Gaddafi: From openness to repression in migration policy ===
Libya's position on immigration shifted beginning in the 1990s, transitioning from a relatively open approach to an increasingly repressive policy, particularly in the context of growing cooperation with the European Union (EU).

During the 1990s, Libya encouraged labor immigration from sub-Saharan Africa in alignment with Muammar Gaddafi’s pan-African policy. The creation in 1998 of the Community of Sahel-Saharan States, which established freedom of movement among member states, notably facilitated migratory flows toward Libya.

Nevertheless, this policy remained selective. Irregular immigration, as well as migration from certain countries such as Sudan and Palestine, was subject to mass expulsions and repressive measures during that period. Libyan law criminalizes irregular entry and stay in the country, which is punishable by imprisonment. Moreover, Libya has consistently refused to ratify the 1951 Refugee Convention, thereby exempting itself from the principle of non-refoulement and from recognizing the legal status of refugees.

From the 2000s onward, Libya adopted a stricter policy toward regular migration flows, introducing in 2004 an annual quota of 46,000 entries. This policy shift coincided with Libya's re-engagement on the international stage after years of isolation. At that time, the EU was seeking, according to some observers, to “externalize” refugee management to countries of transit or departure such as Morocco, Algeria, Mauritania, and Libya.

In 2004, the Italian Prime Minister Silvio Berlusconi visited Libya to meet with Muammar Gaddafi, with the aim of curbing the arrival of irregular migrants in Italy. These agreements resulted in the EU providing Libya with equipment and funding to help control its borders.

This political shift translated into a series of measures to combat both regular and irregular migration. According to official data cited by Human Rights Watch, more than 145,000 migrants were repatriated to their countries of origin between 2003 and 2005. In January 2007, Libya reinstated the requirement for all foreigners to obtain a visa to enter the country, without exception.

== History ==
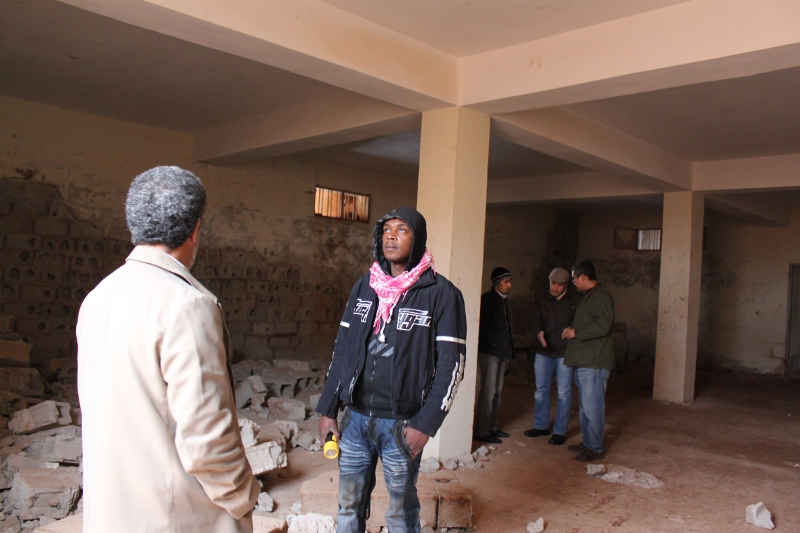
An underground prison in Libya (February, 2011).

=== First migrant detention camps under Muammar Gaddafi (2000s) ===
The first migrant detention centers in Libya date back to the year 2000. Known as holding centers, their stated purpose was to prevent migrants present in Libya from continuing their journey toward Europe and to detain them while awaiting deportation to their countries of origin.

Their number and location are not publicly documented. International NGOs and institutions have access to some of these centres, albeit with difficulty. Other sites are known to them, notably through testimonies from migrants who were previously detained there.

In June 2009, Human Rights Watch documented several detention centres in Kufra, in southeastern Libya; in Tripoli; in Towisha, near Tripoli's airport; and along the northwestern coast of the country, where centres are located in Zawiya (Al-Zawiyah), Misrata, Zuwarah, Zliten, Sabratha, and Ganfuda in Benghazi. The NGO also reported the existence of clandestine centres in Kufra run by smuggling networks, sometimes with the complicity of the authorities.

These detention centres gained increasing importance as migratory flows intensified in the 2000s, while Libya became one of the main departure points for Europe. At the same time, Libya was strengthening its ties with the European Union and Italy. In August 2008, the two countries signed a treaty reinforcing their cooperation in the fight against irregular migration, particularly at sea. Libyan detention centres began receiving migrants intercepted at sea by the Libyan Coast Guard.

=== First alerts from NGOs (from 2006 onwards) ===
Throughout the 2000s, several NGOs attempted to raise international awareness about the situation of migrants held in these centres while awaiting deportation.

As early as 2006, the NGO Human Rights Watch denounced overcrowding in the detention facilities, ill-treatment, and physical violence inflicted on detainees, as well as the lack of access to legal counsel. In 2008, Amnesty International reported on the Zaouia detention centre, where 500 Eritrean migrants were being held and subjected to torture and mistreatment. In 2009, the NGO visited a detention centre in Misrata, where between 600 and 700 people were being held in deplorable conditions.

In 2010, Amnesty International once again raised concerns about the risk of indefinite detention faced by refugees in the country, in a context marked that year by the cessation of the UNHCR's activities in Libya, ordered by the Libyan authorities.

=== After 2011: emergence of an informal detention system and increase in migration flows ===
Following the fall of Muammar Gaddafi's regime in 2011, prisons, migrant detention centres, and control over migration routes fell into the hands of militias and armed groups. These groups used some centres to detain Black Africans and migrants from sub-Saharan Africa, accusing them of having supported the former dictatorship.

The war and the collapse of the regime temporarily boosted migration flows through Libya. In addition to Libyan refugees fleeing the conflict, many migrants passed through the country. In this context, smuggling networks quickly expanded, taking advantage of the instability and lack of centralized control.

A ministerial department reporting to the Interior Ministry was created in 2012. Its mission includes overseeing detention conditions and integrating independent detention centres into the state-run system.

=== Intensification of migratory flows in Libya from 2013 ===
From the first half of 2013, the number of migrants arriving in Libya—and departing towards Europe—began to rise significantly. According to the Frontex agency, 31,500 people landed on Italian shores between January and September 2013, compared to around 10,000 for all of 2012.

Migrants intercepted at sea or arrested within the country were placed in detention centres, which quickly became overcrowded. In response to the influx, new centres were opened in various public buildings—particularly schools repurposed as prisons—and placed under the control of armed groups, often linked to smuggling networks.

In October 2013, the United Nations Support Mission in Libya published a report on detention conditions in 30 centres across the country. Torture was described as widespread and is believed to have caused the deaths of at least 27 people.

In Tripoli, a centre was established within the former zoo, closed since the 2011 revolution. In 2013, this site was controlled by a militia affiliated with the Ministry of the Interior. By 2015, it housed over 800 migrants awaiting departure for Europe, under conditions described as critical. In 2025, a burial site containing the bodies of several migrants was reportedly discovered there, according to the UN.

In 2014, armed conflict exacerbated lawlessness in Libya creating conditions where gangs can abduct migrants and detain them in camps with relative impunity. In 2018 there were approximately 700,000 migrants in Libya, and in 2021 there were more than 5,000 in detention centres.

=== Agreement with the European Union and growing international visibility of the centres (after 2017) ===
On 2 February 2017, Libya and Italy signed a bilateral migration agreement supported by the European Union, which resulted in the strengthening of the Libyan Coast Guard's capacity to intercept migrant boats at sea. As a result, migrants intercepted at sea — including near European shores — were returned to Libya, where they were placed in detention. The following year, in May 2018, Italy handed over responsibility for maritime rescue missions to the Libyan Coast Guard in an effort to reduce migrant arrivals in Europe.

Meanwhile, in April 2017, the International Organization for Migration (IOM) raised the alarm about the growing number of migrants in transit through Libya who were being forcibly held in private residences before being sold in “slave markets” held in garages and parking lots, particularly in Sabha, in the south of the country. These individuals were then forced to work without pay, notably in agriculture and construction. Women, in particular, were subjected to rape and forced prostitution.

In November 2017, the American television network CNN aired footage showing a slave auction near Tripoli. According to information gathered by the media outlet, such auctions were reportedly held once or twice a month.

In response, the United Nations High Commissioner for Human Rights, Zeid Ra’ad Al-Hussein, condemned the worsening conditions of migrants in Libya, describing the EU's cooperation with the Libyan authorities as “inhuman.”

In 2018, Médecins Sans Frontières described "kidnapping for ransom" as a thriving business and criticized European Union-sponsored policies to deter refugees and migrants from traveling to Europe.

== Operations ==
The camps are run by Islamist militias, smuggling gangs, and the Libyan Coast Guard, which itself works outside the normal context of an institutionalized control of a formal central government guidance while being usurped by different local milita leaders

After migrants are abducted, detention center staff telephone the prisoners' families to demand ransoms. Detainees from Chad, South Sudan, Syria, Ghana, Sudan, Niger, and Nigeria suffer violence including beatings, rape, torture, starvation, and murder in the camps. Some people are held for over three years. Those whose family do not pay ransoms may be killed. A 2017 German diplomatic report stated that anyone who does not pay within a set period of time is executed. It quoted witnesses who spoke of precisely five executions every week, every Friday, scheduled to make space for new incoming abductees.

The value of ransom payments vary, with known examples ranging between 2,500 Libyan dinars (US$500) and 25,000 dinars (US$5,000).

Detention facilities are centred around Bani Walid where there are approximately 20 camps including Bani Walid detention camp. Al Mabani centre, which opened in January 2021, is located in Tripoli and detains approximately 1,500 abductees. The Triq al-Sika detention centre is located in Tripoli. The Tajoura Detention Center is located 16 kilometres east of Tripoli. The Al Nasr centre, also known informally as the "Osama prison," is located in Zawiyah.

The financial success of the camps is bolstered by a European Union funded effort to return migrants on boats to Libya.

== Events at detention centres ==
=== Escapes ===
In May 2018, many prisoners at Bani Walid detention center tried to escape, with most being recaptured or shot. In April 2021, more than 20 detainees escaped from a camp south of Bani Walid.

=== Tajoura centre airstrike ===
On 2 July 2019 at 23:30, during the 2019–20 Western Libya campaign, an airstrike hit the Tajoura Detention Center, outside Tripoli, while hundreds of people were inside the facility. 53 people died and over 130 were injured.

=== Tripoli homicides and mass abduction ===
In January 2022, over 600 migrants and asylum seekers were violently attacked outside the location of a former United Nations development center. Several people were killed in the attack, while most were subsequently imprisoned in Ain Zara detention center in Tripoli. The events prompted condemnation from the Norwegian Refugee Council and the International Rescue Committee. The events were praised by Abdul Hamid Dbeibah.

== Criticisms and prosecutions of centre leaders ==
A leaked 2017 report from Germany's Foreign Ministry detailed human rights abuses, and photographic evidence of "concentration camp like conditions.” In 2018, Médecins Sans Frontières condemned arbitrary detention of people and spoke out about the need for protection and humanitarian aid.” In 2019, following the 2019 Tajoura migrant centre airstrike a joint statement from the International Organization for Migration and the United Nations High Commissioner for Refugees called for "an immediate end to detention of migrants and refugees."

Human Rights Watch accused the European Union of "contributing to a cycle of extreme abuse" for its cooperation with authorities in Libya, and wrote that "The EU is providing support to the Libyan Coast Guard to enable it to intercept migrants and asylum seekers at sea after which they take them back to Libya to arbitrary detention, where they face inhuman and degrading conditions and the risk of torture, sexual violence, extortion, and forced labor."

In 2021, Pope Francis was critical of the camps, the "inhuman violence," and the policies that fuel them. In July 2022, the United Nations Security Council adopted resolution number 2647 which encouraged the Libyan authorities to close detention centres.

An Italian court found smuggler Osman Matammud, from Somalia, guilty of multiple counts of murder, abduction and rape. Osama Al Kuni Ibrahim was sanctioned by the United Nations in 2021 after he was accused by US authorities of “systematic exploitation of African migrants at the detention centre” at the Al Nasr centre."

In July 2022 the British Foreign, Commonwealth and Development Office called for all detention centres to be closed.

In May 2026, The HRA Chairman Saad Kassis-Mohamed called on Libyan authorities to release Gambian nationals held in arbitrary detention facilities following mass raids in Sebha, Libya in which over 2,000 migrants were detained after their homes were demolished. The HRA's call followed a joint report by the United Nations Human Rights Office and the United Nations Support Mission in Libya documenting what it described as a systematic cycle of exploitation of migrants in Libya between January 2024 and December 2025.

Kassis-Mohamed stated: "Gambian men have had their teeth broken in Libyan detention facilities. They have been beaten, robbed, and deported without being told what they were signing. They have been arrested at sea and imprisoned without charge. These are not the experiences of people who crossed a border irregularly."

== See also ==
- Human rights in Libya
- Libyan Coast Guard
- Second Libyan Civil War

== Sources ==
- Book Of Shame
