= National Civics Bureau =

Former Malaysian government agency

National Civics Bureau Biro Tatanegara BTN

Agency overview
- Formed: 1981
- Dissolved: 2018
- Type: Promotion of "patriotism and nationalism"
- Jurisdiction: Government of Malaysia
- Website: www.btn.gov.my (archive)

The National Civics Bureau (Malay: Biro Tatanegara), abbreviated BTN, was an agency under the Prime Minister's Department of Malaysia during the governance of Barisan Nasional (BN).

== History ==
The BTN was established in 1974 as the Youth Research Unit (Unit Penyelidikan Belia) under the Youth Ministry, but was renamed and transferred in 1981. Its stated objective was to "nurture the spirit of patriotism and commitment to excellence among Malaysians, and train leaders and future leaders to support the nation's development efforts". Its programmes were controversial and accused of explicitly promoting Ketuanan Melayu (Malay supremacy) and BN.

On 25 November 2009, the Selangor state government issued a ban prohibiting state civil servants, employees of state subsidiaries, and students at state-owned institutions from attending BTN courses. On 2 December 2009, the Penang state government followed suit, banning all state civil servants from attending said courses.

During the 2018 general election, opposition coalition Pakatan Harapan (PH) defeated BN. On 13 August, Youth and Sports Minister Syed Saddiq announced that the BTN and National Service Training Programme (PLKN) had been abolished.

== Criticism and controversy ==
=== Allegations of racism ===
Although BTN has been the subject of various allegations over the years, in late 2009, it became the subject of greater controversy, when many allegations of racism and political propaganda appeared in quick succession. One BTN alumnus claimed that he was "taught a song with lyrics like 'the land that you walk upon is owned by others'. Lecturers told us the Malays were forced to depend on the Chinese for support after 1998 because some Malays had betrayed their own race," in reference to Malays voting against the Barisan Nasional in 1999 general election. Nik Nazmi Nik Ahmad, another alumnus and assemblyman for Seri Setia in the State Legislative Assembly of Selangor, claimed that the BTN camp he attended was "racial and political in nature," with trainers telling attendees that Malays require affirmative action and criticising the opposition Parti Islam SeMalaysia (PAS) as "deviationist". Amirudin Shari, assemblyman for Batu Caves, claimed that "participants are indoctrinated with propaganda about 'Ketuanan Melayu' and external threats". Another alumnus claims he was taught that the Chinese were "the Jews of Asia," and part of a conspiracy to topple the government. Another alumnus alleged she was "told that the Malays were the most supreme race in the world, we were God's chosen few, that the others were insignificant. We were warned about certain elements in our society and abroad, determined to undermine Malay excellence."

On 21 November 2009, Nik Nazmi, Amirudin and five other Pakatan Rakyat state assemblymen asked the Selangor government to stop requiring students at its universities and colleges to attend BTN courses. After the Selangor government issued a ban prohibiting state employees and students at state institutions from attending BTN programmes, the State Executive Councillor for Education, Dr. Halimah Ali, described the courses as "indoctrination by the Barisan Nasional government" and said, "the courses promote racism and my own children who have attended BTN have been given booklets that encourage hate towards the opposition."

In September 2010, BTN deputy director Hamim Husin was reported for referring Chinese as Si mata pepet (the slant-eyed) and Indians as Si botol (the drinkers) during a closed-door function of Puteri UMNO (Women youth wing of United Malays National Organisation) delegates. In November 2010, Minister in Prime Minister's department Nazri Aziz reported that the deputy director has been suspended from duty since October 2010 and a warning letter has been issued. However, the duration of suspension was not disclosed.

=== Response by the Malaysian government ===
The Malaysian Insider reported in November 2009 that in response to brewing controversy, the Cabinet had discussed the need to revamp BTN. Minister in the Prime Minister's Department Idris Jala arranged a briefing for the Cabinet on the effects of BTN programmes, and the meeting concluded with the Prime Minister reportedly saying, "This must end." In an editorial, the publication said: "The Malaysian Insider understands that there are moves within the administration to dilute the syllabus of BTN courses, as a compromise. But such half-measures are not likely to be enough if Najib is serious about reversing what many Malaysians see as institutionalised racism."

Former Deputy Prime Minister Tan Sri Muhyiddin Yassin defended BTN, saying its programmes inculcate nationalism and unity among Malaysians in line with the Prime Minister's 1Malaysia concept. Subsequently, Deputy Minister in the Prime Minister's Department Datuk Ahmad Maslan said "knowledge and information ... presented at these courses are based on historical facts and data ... collected from various agencies and ... experts" and are consistent with 1Malaysia. Ahmad, who is also head of the BTN, denied allegations that it was systemically racist: "Out of the 1,000 lectures given, maybe only one minute the lecturer had a slip-up so it is unfair that you portray BTN as racist just for that." Describing typical course contents, he said participants "are taught about the Federal Constitution, the social contract, the position of the Malays in this country and 60 per cent of the population are the bumiputras." Although Minister in the Prime Minister's Department Nazri Aziz previously told the press that the Cabinet had ordered a revamp of BTN courses to eliminate elements inconsistent with 1Malaysia, Ahmad denied this, saying that Cabinet merely wanted an "upgrade" as opposed to a "revamp". Responding, Nazri insisted that "Whatever word you use, upgrade or revamp ... to me, it is a change of module. Datuk Ahmad Masalan is a member of the Cabinet, he can’t dispute my statement." Nazri also criticised the denial of allegations against BTN, saying that opposition members who had previously been in government like Leader of the Opposition Anwar Ibrahim "know, so what is there to deny?" and said that BTN had been used to promote certain political leaders.

=== Mahathir's involvement in BTN ===
Former Prime Minister Mahathir Mohamad defended BTN as meant to inculcate the values of discipline and hard work in public servants and scholars: "What we tried to teach them is that they should have new values, new culture...because the culture and the value-system they have is not conducive to success. If they want to serve the government well, they must accept and practice a certain value system." The ruling party-owned Utusan Malaysia newspaper criticised the decision to change the BTN curriculum, claiming Nazri was acting on his own and urging the government not to "bow down" to the opposition. In response, Nazri branded Mahathir's statement "bloody racist," criticising both him and Utusan Malaysia for denying the allegations against BTN:

Don't think that people outside do not know about the syllabus based on patriotism for Malays. ... They all know what the syllabus is all about so who are we to say that it did not happen? You want to lie? You make people laugh. I mean there are people who attended the courses who came out very angry. There were many instances of the use of words like ketuanan Melayu. It is ridiculous... Do they want to say that Malaysia belongs only to the Malays and the government is only a Malay government? Should only the Malays be given the spirit of patriotism? Other races are not patriotic about their country?

Nazri denied that criticism from Pakatan Rakyat or the Selangor government decision were reasons for the Cabinet decision, saying: "...courses run by BTN using public funds must be used properly and it amounts to millions so if you want to talk about patriotism, patriotism for all, not just the Malays, for all Malaysians. It's not because of the Selangor state government that we changed the syllabus so it's long before that." In response, Mahathir accused Nazri of hypocrisy, saying "I must be a racist if Nazri says I am racist. Don't ever say that I am not. He knows everything. He belongs to a party which is racist... which is Umno. ... Umno is a party perkauman [racism] and is meant only for Malays and nobody [else] can join. So he (Nazri) is in a racist party but says he is against racism. So he should resign from the party." Mahathir is a former President of Umno, and was still a member of it and the time of making the statement. Koh Tsu Koon, another Minister in the Prime Minister's Department, defended Nazri, saying perhaps Mahathir was unaware of the nature of BTN's curriculum: "[R]ecent feedback from participants since last year showed that the BTN course has diverted from its earlier version. Participants, including JPA [Public Services Department] scholars, felt very upset and disheartened."

Former BTN director and Member of Parliament for Sungai Petani, Johari Abdul then alleged that Mahathir was responsible for changes in the BTN programme, saying that under Mahathir, BTN courses emphasised propaganda supportive of the ruling party, making claims such as "If the Umno-BN government falls, then ... the Malays would be enslaved in their own country." Other Members of Parliament, such as deputy chair of the Barisan Nasional Backbenchers Club and MP for Kinabatangan, Bung Mokhtar Radin, argued that BTN still served a useful purpose: "I don't see it as racist. It is one of the government agencies that have taught society the characteristics of a great nation and understand the real Malaysia. BTN has also played a role since independence towards strengthening racial harmony in this country. So I really regret the actions by Pakatan state governments to prohibit the activities by BTN because BTN has never had the intention to weaken any party members but it is a platform for the public to gain knowledge."

=== Leaked presentation slides ===
From 11 March 2015 until 15 June 2015, BTN had published a series of presentation slides which was available on its official website. One of the presentation slides had claimed Malay independent publishers to be "anti-establishment", in which their "movement without supervision from the authorities" will "bring a negative effect on the government" and giving birth to "new icons of the young generation that spread extreme and free ideas". The slide had also recommended that government officials ban any books having "explicit and free" content produced by them. This has raised ire from the publishers, who had collectively made a media statement demanding a public apology from the agency. Following the incident, BTN decided to take down all the controversial slides from its website while maintaining that the content of the slides were meant for "academic discussion" only.

Other slides published by the agency included a slide that examined the performance of the Barisan Nasional (BN) ruling coalition from 1959 to 2014 with racial breakdown of popular votes towards BN and Pakatan Rakyat (PR) seats and also percentages of Muslim and non-Muslim member of parliament (MPs) in Parliament of Malaysia. Another slide had accused Chinese newspapers of being "fine needles that penetrate the government whilst promoting opposition movements." The national opposition party Democratic Action Party (DAP) is accused of using several Malay leaders to purportedly "destroy the Malay community". DAP was also accused in the slide of controlling the minds of people from Sabah and Sarawak by invoking the issue of the use of the name "Allah" in the context of local Christian presses, and inciting separation of both states from Malaysia. The slide also claimed that a change in the current government will cause "political instability" in the country, bringing up comparisons with the Pol Pot's Khmer Rouge regime. Another slide presents a breakdown of a list of the 10 richest men in Malaysia, where most of them are Chinese, and also the situation of Christians "being allowed to build large churches despite only accounting for 9.1% of the total population in Malaysia". It also argued that "racism can unite a nation or race", whereas the racial minorities in Malaysia "already have their needs fulfilled as entitled under international human rights laws".

== Abolishment ==
In August 2018, Syed Saddiq Syed Abdul Rahman, the Youth and Sports Minister of Malaysia announced that the National Civics Bureau will be abolished with immediate effect. The decision to scrap the BTN programme was made during two successive Cabinet meetings, because evidence shown that the programme was misused to spread misguided indoctrination. The staff and resources under the National Civics Bureau programme will be reassigned to work in other ministries of the Malaysian government.

== See also ==
- Special Affairs Department (JASA)
