= Libyan Coast Guard =

- Emblem of the Libyan Coast Guard
- Active: 1970–present
- Country: Libya
- Branch: Libyan Navy
- Type: Coast guard
- Size: 1,000 (As of 2015).
- Garrison/HQ: Tripoli

Commanders
- Current commander: Commodore Abdallah Toumia
- Spokesman: Brig. Ayoub Qassim

Insignia
- Seal of Libyan Coast Guard

- Naval ensign

- Flag of the Libyan Navy

- Libyan Coast Guard Racing Stripe

The Libyan Coast Guard is the coast guard of Libya. Organizationally part of the Libyan Navy, it operates as a proxy force of the European Union (EU) in order to prevent migrants from reaching the EU's borders. As of 2015, the Libyan Coast Guard consists of over 1,000 personnel. Since 2015, it has received $455 million in funding from the EU. The Libyan Coast Guard is involved in human trafficking, enslavement, torture, and other human rights violations.

== History ==
=== Creation ===
The foundation of the Libyan Coast Guard dates back to 1970 when the previously separate customs and harbor police were joined in a single command within the Libyan Navy and under the ministry of defense. In 2006–2008, the Coast Guard fleet was renewed and equipped with 'stealth' 30-knot (56 km/h; 35 mph) cruising speed PV30-LS patrol boats designed and produced by the Croatian company Adria-Mar.

In 2017, the coast guard were criticised for failing to respond to ten vessels in distress.

=== Role during the migrant crisis in Europe ===
During the 2015 European migrant crisis, the Libyan Coast Guard intercepted refugee and migrant boats travelling across the Mediterranean Sea, per a funding agreement reached with Frontex, the European border agency. The interceptions have been criticised as "worsening the crisis" and in November 2021 were reported to result in 27,500 people being returned to detention centres.

In May 2021, Salvatore Quinci, the mayor of Mazara del Vallo, reported the second recent incident where fishermen were shot at by the coast guard, the later incident non fatally injuring one man. In July 2021, the Libyan Coast Guard was criticised for chasing and then shooting at a migrant boat. Later in July 2021, a former senior Libyan police officer accused the coast guard of robbing people, and of being people smugglers. In November 2021, the coast guard threatened the German humanitarian vessel Sea Watch 4.

On 22 June 2023, the European Union delivered two former patrol boats from the Italian Guardia di Finanza to the Libyan Coast Guard during a ceremony held in the city of Messina. The following month, Libyan coast guards operating one of these two vessels fired multiple times at activists from the NGO SOS Méditerranée while they were rescuing 11 migrants in distress in international waters.

== Criticism of EU funding ==
The EU policy of funding the Libyan Coast Guard has been criticised on the grounds that intercepted migrants face mistreatment. Reports of human rights abuses caused the German government to cease training the Libyan coast guard in 2023, yet EU funding continues.

The United Nations high commissioner for human rights Zeid bin Ra'ad criticised the EU for funding the Libyan coast, calling the policy inhumane. He pointed to the conditions in Libyan Government refugee camps, in which migrants are held after interception. Visits by UN staff had shown these to be overcrowded and lacking basic necessities, refugees held at the camps reported sexual violence being committed by guards.

Activists of the Sea-Watch NGO published a report in 2025, informing about several perceived human rights violations by the LCG and other Libyan militias, often documented by the NGO's own spotter aircraft and NGO ships.

== See also ==
- Detention centres in Libya
- Port security
- Maritime Security Regimes
