= David Scott FitzGerald =

American sociologist

David Scott FitzGerald is a sociologist and professor at UCSD and the Theodore E. Gildred Chair in U.S.-Mexican Relations.

== A Nation of Emigrants ==
In 2008, Scott FitzGerald published A Nation of Emigrants: How Mexico Manages Its Migration with University of California Press. Robyn Rodriguez, reviewing the book for Social Forces, praised it as "a vital contribution to the scholarship on Mexican migration as well as broader scholarly debate about nationalism, transnationalism and citizenship under conditions heightened by global mobility".

In a review for the Journal of American Ethnic History, Dennis J. Bixler-Márquez said that Scott FitzGerald's argument "challenges the position espoused by hyperglobalists" that "the traditional nation-state is on a march to extinction" and instead Scott FitzGerald's book suggests that "globalization trends reflect the power of states to maintain their status". Alexandra Délano, reviewing for The Journal of Politics, wrote that the book "fills a gap in migration studies by expanding the study of how sending states control emigration and deal with its effect". Délano praised the book for Scott FitzGerald's attention to Hometown associations.

== Culling the Masses ==
In 2014, Scott FitzGerald and David Cook-Martín co-authored Culling the Masses: The Democratic Origins of Racist Immigration Policy in the Americas which was published with Harvard University Press. Kevin Yuill, writing in The American Historical Review, said that the book's "main point concerns the coexistence of democracy and racism; the more democratic a country, they note, the more racist its immigration controls."

In a review for Social Forces, Carl L. Bankston praised the book as "a detailed and extensive examination of policies of racial and ethnic exclusion in many of the nations throughout the Americas". G. Reginald Daniel, reviewing for the Hispanic American Historical Review, said that "There have been numerous studies of race and immigration as well as nation formation in the Americas. None has so masterfully integrated these topics as does Culling the Masses"

== Refuge beyond Reach ==
In 2019, Scott FitzGerald published Refuge beyond reach: How rich democracies repel asylum seekers with Oxford University Press.

John Solomos, reviewing for Ethnic and Racial Studies, described the book as "an important intervention" into questions surrounding "how to manage flows of refugees and migrant". Solomos praised the book for breaking from "the tendency for researchers in North America and Europe to develop separate research agendas that do not engage with each other".

Nikolas Feith Tan, writing in the International Journal of Refugee Law, described the book as "a timely and pressing account of today’s ‘architecture of repulsion’". Feith Tan described Scott FitzGerald's engagement with the "apparent conflict between remote control efforts to prevent arrival and non-refoulement obligations that prevent return" as a "key contribution" through his "identification of this tension as systemic".

Talia Shiff, reviewing the book for Social Forces, described Refuge beyond reach as "conceptually innovative". Shiff highlighted Scott FitzGerald's attention to "the limits of attempts to secure the rights of refugees through use of formal legal protections alone" as one of the book's central contributions.

In a review published in the Nordic Journal of Migration Research, Stephen Phillips said that "Of particular value in this book is how it demonstrates through clear and relevant examples that there is nothing new or unique about the current situation facing many states. Phillips compared Scott FitzGerald's book to contributions by Daniel Ghezelbash, Thomas Gammeltoft-Hansen, Nikolas Tan, and James Hathaway.

Riona Moodley, writing in the Australian Journal of Human Rights, suggested that "there are a few occasions when conclusions appear to be either overstated, or insufficiently supported by empirical evidence". Moodley wrote that the book could be criticized because it "largely replicates existing academic commentary on extraterritorial migration controls in the areas of forced migration and refugee law studies". Moodley praised Scott FitzGerald for his attention to issues which have become so entrenched in asylum processes that they lack visibility.

== Works ==
- FitzGerald, David (2008). A Nation of Emigrants: How Mexico Manages Its Migration. University of California Press. ISBN 978-0-520-94247-9.
- FitzGerald, David Scott (2014). Culling the Masses: The Democratic Origins of Racist Immigration Policy in the Americas. Harvard University Press. ISBN 978-0-674-36967-2.
- FitzGerald, David Scott (2019). Refuge beyond Reach: How Rich Democracies Repel Asylum Seekers. Oxford University Press. ISBN 978-0-19-087417-9.
