= Irregular migration =

Crossing an international border without permission

Irregular, unauthorized, or undocumented migration is the practice of crossing an international border without official permission from the authorities. Irregular migration is not synonymous with illegal immigration because irregular travel in order to seek asylum is not a crime. According to the European Commission, "the term 'illegal migration' should be avoided, as some irregular migrants are not attempting illegal immigration. Being in a country without the required papers is, in some countries, not a criminal offence but an administrative infringement." In 1993, the UK House of Lords ruled that an asylum seeker who had forged papers in order to enter the UK had not entered the country illegally.

== List ==
Rank	Metropolitan area	Country	Estimated irregular migrant population	Year	Notes
1	New York metropolitan area	United States	1,100,000	2016	Pew Research Center.
2	Metropolitan Lima	Peru	1,000,000	2025	Reuters; National Superintendency of Migration.
3	Los Angeles metropolitan area	United States	925,000	2016	Pew Research Center.
4	Madrid metropolitan area	Spain	700,000	2026	Reuters.
5	Greater London	United Kingdom	390,000–585,000	2017	Pew Research Center.
6	Johannesburg metropolitan area	South Africa	500,000	2026	Associated Press.
7	Santiago metropolitan area	Chile	300,000	2023	United Nations High Commissioner for Refugees.
8	Chicago metropolitan area	United States	180,000	2019	Migration Policy Institute.
9	Houston metropolitan area	United States	175,000	2019	Migration Policy Institute.
10	Dallas–Fort Worth metroplex	United States	170,000	2019	Migration Policy Institute.
11	Miami metropolitan area	United States	150,000	2019	Migration Policy Institute.
12	Paris metropolitan area	France	150,000	2017	Pew Research Center.
13	Milan metropolitan area	Italy	120,000	2017	Pew Research Center.
14	Greater Toronto Area	Canada	100,000	2024	Government of Canada.
15	Athens metropolitan area	Greece	100,000	2017	Pew Research Center.
