= Resident certificate =

Taiwanese identity document

ROC (Taiwan) Resident Certificate 中華民國居留證 Zhōnghuámínguó Jūliúzhèng (Mandarin) Tiong-hôa-bîn-kok Ki-liû-chèng (Taiwanese) Chûng-fà-mìn-koet Kî-liù-chṳn (Hakka)
- Type: Identity document
- Issued by: National Immigration Agency
- Valid in: (Taiwan) Free area of the Republic of China
- Eligibility: Foreign residents, unregistered nationals
- Expiration: 1–3 years
- Cost: NT$1,000 per year

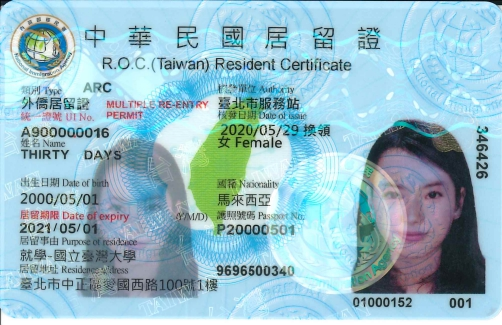
R.O.C. (Taiwan) Resident Certificate, obverse

A Resident Certificate (Chinese: 居留證; pinyin: jū liú zhèng; Pe̍h-ōe-jī: Ki-liû-chèng) is the identity document issued to long-term or permanent residents of the Taiwan area of the Republic of China who do not have Household registration in Taiwan. In Taiwanese laws, all nationals with household registration are issued a National Identification Card. The Resident Certificate is issued by the National Immigration Agency. Currently, there are several types of Resident Certificate that reflect the bearer's immigration status.

The Alien Resident Certificate (Chinese: 外僑居留證; pinyin: Wàiqiáo Jūliúzhèng; Pe̍h-ōe-jī: Gōa-kiâu Ki-liû-chèng), or ARC, is given to foreign residents in Taiwan, while the nearly identical Taiwan Area Resident Certificate (Chinese: 台灣地區居留證; pinyin: Táiwān Dìqū jūliú zhèng; Pe̍h-ōe-jī: Tâi-oân Tē-khu Ki-liû-chèng), or TARC, is given to national without household registration including qualified overseas Taiwanese, qualified overseas Chinese, and recently naturalized nationals. Nationals of the People's Republic of China (including mainland China, Hong Kong, and Macau) are given Taiwan Area resident certificates with special annotations.

== Alien Resident Certificate ==
There are various methods of qualifying for an ARC, including undertaking sanctioned employment with a work permit, joining family members (including parents, children and spouses) who are themselves legal residents in the Republic of China, undertaking missionary work, investing in a local business, or studying at an approved institution. The relevant authorities may also choose to grant an ARC to foreigners who fit none of the above categories on an ad hoc basis. The ARC is issued by the National Immigration Agency.

The document itself is a plastic credit card-sized card with an embedded integrated circuit containing confidential personal data, and costs the applicant NT$1,000 per year. The electronic ARC cards replaced a paper version in 2007–8, and were intended to "not only bring new convenience to foreigners but would also contribute to the government's anti-forgery and anti-terrorism drives." As of October 2009 around 60,000 foreign residents have yet to exchange their old paper ARCs for a new IC card. The paper cards were phased out on 1 February 2010. A multiple entry permit is now included on the card, whereas previously it was stamped separately in the holder's passport. The applicant may apply for a maximum of three years validity for the ARC, with some categories (for example missionary work or study) being limited to a maximum of one year at a time. Some types of ARC (Joining Family or Teaching) require a medical examination conducted at an approved hospital. Besides entitling the bearer to remain in Taiwan for the duration of the certificate's validity, the ARC is also needed to apply for a driving license in Taiwan.

There is also an Alien Permanent Resident Certificate (Chinese: 外僑永久居留證; pinyin: Wàiqiáo Yǒngjiǔ Jūliú Zhèng; Pe̍h-ōe-jī: Gōa-kiâu Éng-kiú Ki-liû-chèng), or APRC available. To obtain the APRC, residence (classed as 183 days or more in a year) must have been maintained for five years. Other conditions apply, including meeting minimum salary or assets requirements, and a criminal record check carried out in the applicant's home country. The fee for an APRC is NT$10,000.

The key visual differences between an ARC and an APRC are as follow:

- The APRC does not contain a reason for residency; an ARC does (e.g., working)
- The APRC does not include an expiry date, whereas the ARC does
- The APRC does include the initial date of approval of permanent residency along with the date the specific card was issued
- The APRC has "Alien Permanent Residence Certificate" printed on it in English and Chinese
- The reverse of the APRC merely states that a permanent resident certificate may be revoked in accordance with the applicable laws and regulations

If the holder became eligible for an APRC through marriage to a Taiwanese national, the holder must either remain in the country for 183 days per year or else arrange an exemption with the National Immigration Agency in order to maintain permanent residency.

If the holder became eligible for an APRC through work, the holder must return to Taiwan at least once in a five-year period.

The APRC card itself does not carry an expiration date and thus renewals are not required. However, APRC holders are required to get the card updated whenever they change their residential address or are issued a new passport. Relevant documentation is required (e.g., a lease agreement for a change of residential address). The law permitting permanent residency was established in 1999, and the first APRCs were issued in 2000.

== Taiwan Area Resident Certificate ==
The TARC is issued to national without household registration who reside in Taiwan. These people are qualified as nationals (國民) under Taiwanese nationality law, but do not have valid household registration in Taiwan. Establishing household registration in Taiwan is required for a national over 14 years of age to possess a National Identification Card. In Taiwanese laws, household registration has close ties to exercise civil and political rights like a citizen (公民). The Taiwanese laws makes a distinction between "registered nationals" (有戶籍國民) and "unregistered nationals" (無戶籍國民), with the former having the right of abode, right to vote, and other benefits of citizenship, while the latter are subject to deportation from Taiwan and need an entry permit to visit Taiwan. While "registered nationals" are entitled to hold the National Identification Card, "unregistered nationals" may only hold the TARC. Both groups are eligible to hold the Taiwan passport.

For adult "unregistered nationals" to become "registered nationals", and thus eligible for an ID Card, they must reside in Taiwan for a certain period of time, during which they will hold a TARC instead of an ID Card. Currently, for "unregistered nationals" who have direct lineal relatives who are "registered nationals" (e.g. overseas-born Taiwanese) and foreigners who have naturalized as ROC nationals, this period is (1) continuously for one year, (2) 270 days per year for two years, or (3) 183 days per year for five years.

== Academic and Business Travel Card ==
With the stated aim of attracting exceptional foreign professionals to Taiwan, the government established an Academic and Business Travel Card (Chinese: 學術與商務旅行卡; Pe̍h-ōe-jī: Ha̍k-su̍t í Siong-bū Lú-hêng-khah) in 2009. The card is valid for three years and entitles the bearer to stay in the country for 30 days at a time, with multiple entry permission and priority queueing at immigration when entering and leaving the country. While in Taiwan, the holder can conduct academic or business affairs.

== Card Number Format ==
Starting Jan 2, 2021, the current number format will be replaced with that aligning with that of the national ID card. Unfortunately this is causing a lot of confusion in Taiwan since it means most official and commercial websites in Taiwan are not able to accept the new format since it isn't actually the same as the format used for locals. Specifically, without recoding every website, no website will accept a card with an "8" or a "9" in the second place.

The old number format consists of two English letters followed by eight digits. The previous format has hindered foreign nationals from carrying out such matters as online shopping, ticket booking, hospital registration, and so on. The European Chamber of Commerce Taiwan (ECCT) has repeatedly drawn this situation to the attention of government agencies in its annual Position Papers.

The new format consists of one English letter followed by nine digits.

(a) English letter: Area code, indicating the place of application, corresponding to the area code in citizens’ ID card numbers.

(b) First digit: Indicates gender, 8 for male and 9 for female.

(c) Last digit: checksum

== See also ==
- Alien's passport
- National Identification Card (Republic of China)
