= National identification card (Taiwan) =

Identity document of Taiwan

Republic of China national identification card
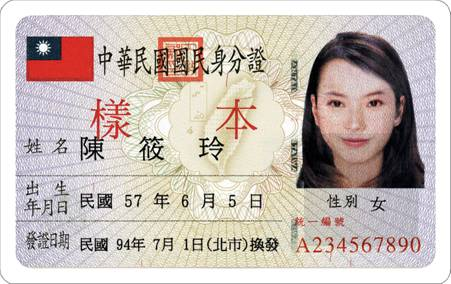
- Front

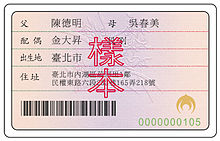
- Back
- Type: Identity document
- Issued by: Republic of China (Taiwan)
- First issued: 2025-07-10
- Purpose: Identification
- Valid in: Free area of the Republic of China
- Eligibility: Household registration in Taiwan
- Expiration: Indefinite
- Cost: NT$50

National identification card
- Traditional Chinese: 中華民國 國民身分證
- Simplified Chinese: 中华民国 国民身分证
Transcriptions
Standard Mandarin
- Hanyu Pinyin: Zhōnghuámínguó Guómín Shēnfènzhèng
- Bopomofo: ㄓㄨㄥ ㄏㄨㄚˊ ㄇㄧㄣˊ ㄍㄨㄛˊ ㄍㄨㄛˊ ㄇㄧㄣˊ ㄕㄣ ㄈㄣˋ ㄓㄥˋ
- Gwoyeu Romatzyh: Jonghwamin'gwo Gwomin Shenfennjenq
- Wade–Giles: Chung¹-hua²-min²-kuo² Kuo²-min² Shen¹-fen⁴-cheng⁴
- Tongyong Pinyin: Jhonghuámínguó Guómín Shēnfènjhèng
- MPS2: Jūnghuámínguó Guómín Shēnfènjèng
Hakka
- Pha̍k-fa-sṳ: Chûng-fà-mìn-koet Koet-mìn Sṳ̂n-fun-chṳn
Yue: Cantonese
- Jyutping: zung¹-waa⁴-man⁴-gwok³ gwok³-man⁴ san¹-fan²-zing³
Southern Min
- Hokkien POJ: Tiong-hôa-bîn-kok Kok-bîn Sin-hun-chèng
- Tâi-lô: Tiong-hûa-bîn-kok Kok-bîn Sin-hun-tsìng

The national identification card (Chinese: 國民身分證; pinyin: Guómín Shēnfènzhèng; Pe̍h-ōe-jī: Kok-bîn Sin-hun-chèng) is a compulsory identity document issued to people who hold both nationality and household registration in Taiwan (ROC). The National Identification Card served as the evidence for the household registration in Taiwan which grants the holder the right of abode and full civil and political rights in Taiwan. The card is used for virtually all other activities that require identity verification within Taiwan such as opening bank accounts and voting.

Despite the name mentioning "national", not all nationals regulated by Taiwanese nationality law are eligible to apply for an ID card. Nationals without household registration are not qualified for an ID card. These people, mainly overseas Taiwanese or overseas Chinese, are only eligible to apply for a Taiwan passport. They will need to apply for an Exit & Entry Permit or Resident Certificate if they want to perform short-term visit or long-term residency in Taiwan respectively.

== Eligibility ==
The national identification card is issued to nationals with household registration in Taiwan. Establishing household registration in Taiwan is required for a national over 14 years of age to possess a National Identification Card. In Taiwanese laws, household registration has close ties to exercise civil and political rights like a citizen (公民). The Taiwanese laws makes a distinction between "nationals with household registration" (NWHR, 有戶籍國民) and "nationals without household registration" (NWOHR, 無戶籍國民), with the former having the right of abode, right to vote, and other benefits of citizenship, while the latter are subject to deportation from Taiwan and need an entry permit to visit Taiwan. While NWHR are entitled to hold the National Identification Card, NWOHR may only hold the Taiwan Area Resident Certificate (TARC). Both groups are eligible to hold the Taiwan passport. The Taiwan Area Resident Certificate is nearly identical to the Alien Resident Certificate (ARC) held by foreign residents in Taiwan.

Anyone under the age of majority in Taiwan (20 years of age), one of whose parents was an NWHR at the time of birth, could direct establish household registration. (Before 1980, this was only possible if said parent was the father, i.e. nationality was transmitted through the male line. In particular, the child of a Taiwanese mother and foreign father was not even an NWOHR, let alone eligible to establish household registration.)

Adult NWOHRs with direct lineal relatives who are NWHRs are eligible to apply for the aforementioned TARC and are eligible for household registration after residing in Taiwan for a certain period of time. Currently, this period is (1) continuously for one year, (2) 270 days per year for two years, or (3) 183 days per year for five years.

In 2024, new amendments to the Immigration Act passed in 2023 took effect, which dramatically loosened restrictions on children of NWHRs to establish household residency. In particular, adult NWOHRs, at least of whose parents was a NWHR at the time of birth, were eligible to directly establish household registration. While this eliminated the legal distinction with respect to eligibility for household registration between underage and adult NWOHR children of NWHRs, there remain several administrative differences to actually register, such as the requirement for the adult NWOHR to enter Taiwan on an NWOHR passport (in contrast, underage NWOHRs can enter Taiwan on a foreign passport before establishing household registration).

For foreigners who have naturalised as ROC nationals as well as all other holders of TARCs, the above periods of time (continuously for one year, 270 days per year for two years, or 183 days per year for five years) also apply after they receive their TARCs before they are eligible for household registration.

== Usage ==
The Identification Card contains the holder's photo, ID number, Chinese name, and (Minguo calendar) date of birth. The back of the card contains more detailed information, including the person's registered address where official correspondence is sent, as well as the names of his/her legal ascendant(s). If the person moves, he/she must re-register at a municipal office (戶政事務所).

Unlike the Republic of China passport which can be issued overseas at Taipei Economic and Cultural Offices and ROC embassies and consulates, the National Identification Card is only issued in Taiwan at district, municipal, and township offices. Male dual passport holders who register for household registration and the Identification Card also become eligible for military conscription within the Republic of China, unless the person has overseas resident status (僑居身分).

Possession of the Identification Card is required to obtain the People's Republic of China's Taiwan Compatriot Permit for entry into Mainland China. Most countries granting visa-free entry for ROC passport holders require that the passport holder also possess a National Identification Card. Those without National Identification Cards (e.g. "unregistered nationals") will have the National Identification Card field blank in their passports.

== Format ==
=== Uniform identification number ===
The uniform identification number (Chinese: 統一編號; pinyin: Tǒngyī Biānhào; Pe̍h-ōe-jī: Thóng-it Pian-hō) is a unique number issued to every individual who are citizen or foreign residents of Taiwan (with National identification card or Resident certificate). The government started to issue ID numbers to citizens since Apr 1, 1965. The same format of ID number are also issued to foreign residents since Jan 2, 2021.

A valid uniform identification number consists of one (1) English letter and nine (9) numerical digits. The initial English letter is an administrative division identifier, the first numerical digit is sex and nationality identifier, and the last (ninth) numerical digit is a checksum.

The initial English letter refers to the place of a citizen's first household registration or a foreign resident's first residence registration.

Letter	Administrative division	Issued since	Issued until	Notes
A	Taipei City	Apr 1, 1965	—N/a	
B	Taichung City	Apr 1, 1965	—N/a	
C	Keelung City	Apr 1, 1965	—N/a	
D	Tainan City	Apr 1, 1965	—N/a	
E	Kaohsiung City	Apr 1, 1965	—N/a	
F	New Taipei City	Apr 1, 1965	—N/a	Formerly named Taipei County
G	Yilan County	Apr 1, 1965	—N/a	
H	Taoyuan City	Apr 1, 1965	—N/a	Formerly named Taoyuan County
I	Chiayi City	Jul 1, 1982	—N/a	Formerly part of Chiayi County (Q)
J	Hsinchu County	Apr 1, 1965	—N/a	
K	Miaoli County	Apr 1, 1965	—N/a	
L	Taichung County	Apr 1, 1965	Dec 24, 2010	Now part of Taichung City (B)
M	Nantou County	Apr 1, 1965	—N/a	
N	Changhua County	Apr 1, 1965	—N/a	
O	Hsinchu City	Jul 1, 1982	—N/a	Formerly part of Hsinchu County (J)
P	Yunlin County	Apr 1, 1965	—N/a	
Q	Chiayi County	Apr 1, 1965	—N/a	
R	Tainan County	Apr 1, 1965	Dec 24, 2010	Now part of Tainan City (D)
S	Kaohsiung County	Apr 1, 1965	Dec 24, 2010	Now part of Kaohsiung City (E)
T	Pingtung County	Apr 1, 1965	—N/a	
U	Hualien County	Apr 1, 1965	—N/a	
V	Taitung County	Apr 1, 1965	—N/a	
W	Kinmen County	Apr 1, 1965	—N/a	
X	Penghu County	Apr 1, 1965	—N/a	
Y	Yangmingshan Adm. Bur.	Apr 1, 1965	Dec 31, 1973	Now part of Taipei City (A)
Z	Lienchiang County	Apr 1, 1965	—N/a	

The first digit refers to the individual's sex and nationality:

Number	Sex	Status	Document
1	Male	Citizen	National identification card
2	Female	Citizen	National identification card
8	Male	Foreign resident	Resident certificate
9	Female	Foreign resident	Resident certificate

=== Photographs ===
In 2023, the Taiwan Ministry of the Interior banned the use of mirror photos on national identification cards.

=== eID ===
In May 2019, the Taiwan Government announced the “New eID – the Issue of Next Generation National ID Card Scheme” (“Scheme”) to change the format of national ID cards to a digital format (“eID cards”). In 2023, the court of Taiwan discussed litigation on the issue and the Taiwan government subsequently postponed moving to the new digital format.

== See also ==
- Identity document
- List of national identity card policies by country
- Household registration in Taiwan
- Taiwan passport
- Resident Certificate
