= National without household registration =

Republic of China nationality class associated with living abroad

- Traditional Chinese: 無戶籍國民
- Simplified Chinese: 无户籍国民
Transcriptions
Standard Mandarin
- Hanyu Pinyin: wú hùjí guómín
- Wade–Giles: wu² hu⁴-chi² kuo²-min²
Hakka
- Pha̍k-fa-sṳ: mò fu-sit koet-mìn
Southern Min
- Hokkien POJ: bô hō͘-che̍k kok-bîn
- Tâi-lô: bô hōo-tsi̍k kok-bîn

A national without household registration (NWOHR) is a person with Republic of China nationality who does not have household registration in Taiwan. Nationals with this status may be subject to immigration controls when entering the Taiwan Area, do not have automatic residence rights there, cannot vote in Taiwanese elections, and are exempt from conscription. As of 2011, about 60,000 NWOHRs held Taiwanese passports with this status. Most NWOHRs are overseas compatriots (individuals born to nationals overseas). According to statistics from the Overseas Community Affairs Council, there are as many as 39 million of these overseas compatriots. Foreigners who naturalize and gain Republic of China nationality are temporarily considered NWOHRs, for at least 1 year, until they can register household registration.

== Terminology ==
In the latest revision of the Immigration Act, "臺灣地區無戶籍國民" and "national without household registration in the Taiwan Area" are used to refer to NWOHR in the Chinese and English versions respectively. The government has used several other English translations for NWOHR in the past, many of which are misleading. These include: "nationals without registered permanent residence in the Taiwan Area", "non-citizen ROC nationals", "unregistered nationals", "Overseas Chinese having not established household registration in the Republic of China", and "people without nationalities in Taiwan". TheTaipei Times occasionally uses "nationals without citizenship", this is however incorrect as Article 3 of the Constitution states that "Persons possessing the nationality of the Republic of China shall be citizens of the Republic of China", indicating that all nationals are considered citizens.

== Background ==
The Republic of China (ROC) governed mainland China from 1912 to 1949. The islands of Taiwan and Penghu were ceded to the Empire of Japan in 1895 by Qing China, the last ruling dynastic Chinese regime, following its defeat in the First Sino-Japanese War. Control of these islands was transferred to the ROC in 1945 after the Second World War. Near the end of the Chinese Civil War, the Nationalist government was forced to retreat to Taiwan by the Communist Party, which subsequently established the People's Republic of China (PRC) in 1949. Since the conclusion of the war, the ROC has controlled only the Taiwan Area.

At the Cold War era, the government of the Republic of China on Taiwan continues to constitutionally claim territories controlled by the People's Republic of China (PRC) and Mongolian People's Republic (MPR) as part of its territory. Because of this, the Nationality Act treated residents of those territories as nationals. Additionally, because Taiwanese nationality law operates under the principle of jus sanguinis, most overseas Chinese, Mongolian, and Taiwanese were also regarded as nationals during this era. During the Cold War, both the ROC and PRC governments actively sought the support of overseas Chinese communities in their attempts to secure the position as the legitimate sole government of China. The ROC also encouraged overseas Chinese businessmen to settle in Taiwan to facilitate economic development. Regulations concerning evidence of ROC nationality by descent were particularly lax during this period, allowing many overseas Chinese the right to settle in Taiwan.

From the late 1980s, Taiwan developed a stronger sense of local national identity and more readily asserted its separate identity from that of China. Legal reforms between 1999 and 2002 greatly reduced the ease by which further grants of ROC nationality were made to overseas Chinese and restricted citizenship rights only to those with household registration in Taiwan. Full citizenship rights, including permanent residence and voting, can only be exercised by nationals who have been registered. NWOHRs are now treated as an external population to Taiwan.

Residents of Mongolia, which was part of Imperial China until 1911, were also regarded as if they were mainland Chinese residents until 2002, when the Mainland Affairs Council removed the country from the administrative definition of the Mainland Area. Since then, Mongolians have been treated as foreigners and are required to apply for visas before entering Taiwan. In May 2013, the Mainland Affairs Council reaffirmed that Outer Mongolia is not a part of ROC's territorial claims and Mongolia is a sovereign state.

Residents of mainland China, which is now under the jurisdiction of the People's Republic of China (PRC), were identified as nationals given the pre-1949 history of the Republic of China. In May 2023, Executive Yuan released a policy memorandum to clarify that: "The people of mainland China do not have ROC nationality, and hence are not ROC nationals." (中國大陸人民不具中華民國國籍、非屬中華民國國民)

As of 2011, people with NWOHR status are estimated to be around 60,000, mainly overseas Taiwanese, Chinese, and Mongolian living in East Asian countries of Japan and South Korea as well as the Southeast Asian countries of Myanmar, Philippines, Thailand, and Vietnam. Among the NWOHRs living in Taiwan, many of them are ethnic Chinese from the Philippines descended from ROC nationals. A significant portion also come from Myanmar and Thailand, where Republic of China Army detachments fled to after the Chinese Civil War. Descendants of these soldiers entered Taiwan on forged or stolen passports, often to enroll in universities. Because they were not considered nationals of the countries they traveled from, they could not be deported. 875 of these descendants and 107 members of the Tibetan diaspora were granted amnesty in 2009, allowing them to apply for residency.

== Rights and responsibilities ==
The law of Taiwan states significantly different rights and responsibilities between nationals with or without household registration. Nationals with household registration are the conceptual citizens in Taiwanese laws. Nationals without household registration, on the other hand, are subject to immigration controls and do not have automatic residence or employment rights in Taiwan.

NWOHRs given approval to reside in Taiwan are restricted from rights and benefits reserved for full Taiwanese citizens. They are not entitled to hold national identification cards and are given Taiwan Area Resident Certificates instead. The lack of household registration makes them ineligible for national health insurance and automatic workers' compensation coverage. They cannot vote in elections or stand for public office. NWOHRs who concurrently hold foreign nationality are additionally required to apply for work permits to be employed in Taiwan, unless they meet one of the requirements listed in Article 31 of the Act for the Recruitment and Employment of Foreign Professionals, such as having acquired nationality by naturalization.

== Reasons for NWOHRs to gain residence in Taiwan ==
The following 25 items are reasons for which a NWOHR may apply for residence in Taiwan. The code featured in the left hand column is printed on the Taiwan Area Resident Permit (TARC) under the Purpose of Residence label.

Code	Reason
AF351	Married for less than four years to a person with household registration in the Taiwan Area, and with no minor children who have household registration in the Taiwan Area.
AF352	Married for at least four years to a person with household registration in the Taiwan Area, or has minor children with household registration in the Taiwan Area.
AF353	Has a lineal blood relative with household registration in the Taiwan Area.
AF354	Has a sibling, or the parents of their spouse, with household registration in the Taiwan Area.
AF358	Has invested at least NT$10 million in the Taiwan Area, with approval from or filing with the competent central authority for the relevant industry.
AF360	Previously approved by the competent central authority for the relevant industry to come to Taiwan for study, applied for residence in the Taiwan Area, and after graduation returned to their place of overseas residence and worked there for at least two years.
AF362	Possesses special skills and experience and has been recruited to return to the country by the competent central authority for the relevant industry.
AF364	Otherwise appointed or employed by a government agency or a public or private university or college.
AF366	Permitted by the central labor authority or competent authority for the relevant industry to engage in work in the Taiwan Area under Article 46, Paragraph 1, Subparagraphs 1 through 7 or Subparagraph 11 of the Employment Service Act.
AF368	Overseas Chinese student approved by the competent central authority for the relevant industry to return to the country for study.
AF369	Student approved by the competent central authority for the relevant industry to return to the country to receive vocational or technical training.
AF389	Master's or doctoral student approved by the competent central authority for the relevant industry to return to the country to conduct research or an internship.
AF370	Permitted by the central labor authority to engage in work in the Taiwan Area under Article 46, Paragraph 1, Subparagraphs 8 through 10 of the Employment Service Act.
AF371	A stateless person from Thailand, Myanmar, or Indonesia who entered the country before the Immigration Act came into force and subsequently acquired ROC nationality through naturalization.
AF372	A person who renounced foreign nationality and acquired ROC nationality through naturalization.
AF392	A stateless person who entered the country between May 21, 1999 and December 31, 2008, who was approved by the Ministry of Education or Overseas Community Affairs Council to return from Thailand or Myanmar for study or technical training, who could not be forcibly removed from the country, who was permitted by the National Immigration Agency to reside, and who acquired nationality domestically.
AF393	A stateless person from India or Nepal who entered the country before June 29, 2016, who could not be forcibly removed, whose identity was recognized by the Mongolian and Tibetan Cultural Center of the Ministry of Culture, who was permitted by the National Immigration Agency to reside, and who acquired nationality domestically.
AF397	A person who has rendered distinguished service to the Republic of China and has been permitted by the Ministry of the Interior to naturalize as an ROC national.
AF398	A senior professional whose expertise is needed by the ROC and who has been permitted by the Ministry of the Interior to naturalize as an ROC national.
AF373	A national without household registration in the Taiwan Area who entered the country before the Immigration Act came into force and who could not be forcibly removed in accordance with the applicable provisions.
AF382	A currently serving legislator elected by overseas citizens.
AF384	Adult child born abroad to a national who resides in the Taiwan Area and has household registration.
AF385	Entered the country using an ROC passport, has legally and continuously stayed in the Taiwan Area for at least seven years, and has resided for at least 183 days in each year.
AF387	Has made a special contribution to the nation or society, or is a senior professional whose expertise is needed by the Taiwan Area.
AF395	Came to Taiwan for study, after graduation, employment, or investment, and applies to remain in Taiwan to seek employment because the original reason for residence has ceased to exist.

== Acquisition and loss ==
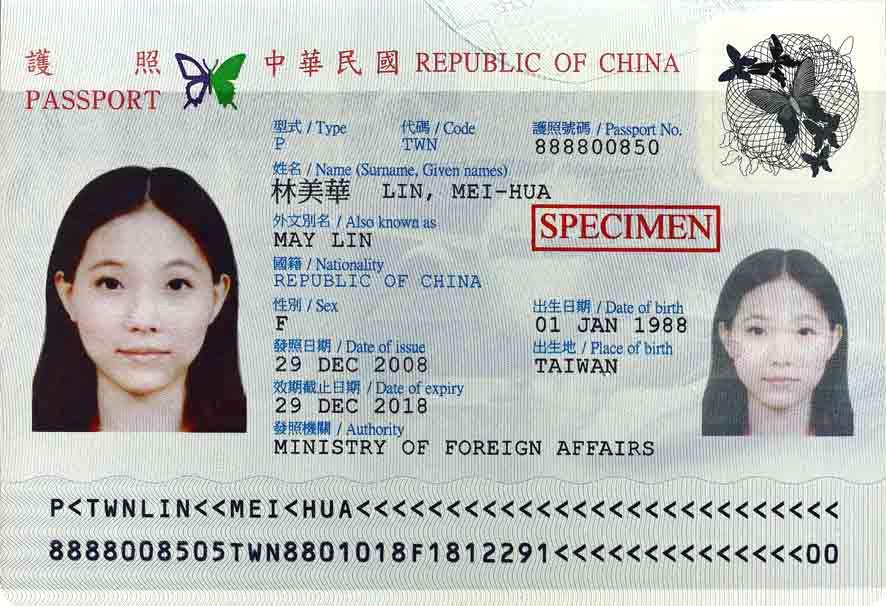
A Taiwanese passport with no national identification number listed in its data page means the holder is a national without household registration.

The NWOHR status are those people who qualify under Taiwanese nationality law but do not possess Household registration in Taiwan. Status changes on either nationality or household registration might affect the NWOHR status.

Acquisition of NWOHR status	Born to at least one parent with NWOHR status
Acquisition of NWOHR status	Born overseas to at least one parent with household registration in Taiwan
Acquisition of NWOHR status	Newly naturalized nationals
Acquisition of NWOHR status	Recognized by a Taiwanese diplomatic mission to be overseas nationals (obsolete with limited grandfather clause)
Loss of NWOHR status	Establish household registration in Taiwan
Loss of NWOHR status	Loss of nationality
Loss of NWOHR status	Obtain hukou in the People's Republic of China, or obtain Chinese passport

=== Acquisition by birth ===
Children born to at least one parent with nationality are automatically nationals at birth regardless of their place of birth. However, the household registration in Taiwan can only be completed in Taiwan, and only Taiwanese people with household registrations may register their children into the household of themselves.

If a child is born to at least one parent with NWOHR status, the child is also with NWOHR status even if the birth is given in Taiwan, since there is no process available to establish household registration in Taiwan. If a child is born overseas to at least one parent with household registration in Taiwan (NWHR status), the child is eligible to establish household registration in Taiwan through his/her parent. However, the child will remain in NWOHR status until he/she completes the registration process in Taiwan.

To claim the nationality of a child born overseas, the parents will need to submit proof of a parent's nationality together with the birth certificate of the child to the Taiwanese diplomatic mission with the place of birth fall under its jurisdiction. In 2010, the government estimated more than 30 million people are estimated to be eligible to claim passports through nationality by descent. This anomalously high number came from many ethnic Chinese and Mongolian living overseas acquired nationality through the old nationality law prior to 2000 amendment.

=== Acquisition by naturalization ===
Foreigners who acquire ROC nationality through naturalization will briefly become NWOHRs once they complete the naturalization process. Permission to establish household registration in Taiwan can be applied for at NIA 1 year after obtaining ROC nationality. The recently naturalized national will become NWHR once the permission to reside document from NIA is submitted to the household registration office.

=== Acquisition by recognition (obsolete) ===
The Nationality Act prior to 2000 amendment considered all people of Chinese descent to be nationals of the Republic of China. Ethnic Chinese and Mongolian living overseas, regardless of their place of birth may also acquired nationality from a diplomatic mission with the Certificate of Overseas Chinese Identity issued by the Overseas Chinese Affairs Council of the government of the Republic of China.

After the 2000 amendment, the Certificate of Overseas Chinese identity is no longer a valid document to apply for a Taiwanese passport. Clauses for the Ministry of Foreign Affairs to grant special permissions to issue Taiwanese passports to People's Republic of China (PRC) nationals from mainland China, Hong Kong, and Macau still exist, but no cases have been granted permission after the 2010s.

=== Acquisition through spouse ===
If the spouse of an ROC national is a resident of the PRC, they can obtain household registration in Taiwan in approximately six years without acquiring ROC nationality first. Spouses who are nationals of other countries need to become naturalized ROC nationals first after having resided in Taiwan for three years. It then takes an additional one to five years for them to become eligible for household registration in Taiwan.

=== Loss by obtaining household registration ===
NWOHRs may request approval to reside in Taiwan for employment, study, investment, or family reunion. They may establish household registration in some circumstances after continuous residence for 335 days in one year, 270 days per year for two years, or 183 days per year for five years, which grants full citizenship rights in Taiwan. Changes to legislation have additionally allowed NWOHRs born to at least one Taiwanese parent with household registration at the time of birth to establish household registration without a residency period since January 1, 2024.

The above processes can only be done if the NWOHR entered Taiwan on their NWOHR passport unless they are NWOHR by naturalization or is a NWOHR born to a Taiwan-area person and is still a minor or born in Taiwan but left without completing birth registration. Mainland Area persons are subject to annual immigration quotas limiting the number of people acquiring residence permits and household registration each year. All NWOHRs who successfully obtain household registration continue to be exempt from conscription until one year after the day they are registered.

=== Loss of nationality ===
NWOHRs may voluntarily relinquish the status by application to the Ministry of the Interior, provided that they have acquired another nationality or are married to foreign nationals. The status may be deprived if it was fraudulently acquired. All Taiwanese nationals, including NWOHRs, who obtain hukou in mainland China automatically have their passports cancelled and any residence rights in Taiwan revoked.

== Entry requirements ==
Although NWOHRs may travel using a Taiwanese passport, because the status by itself does not give its holders residence rights in Taiwan, the travel restrictions are different from those Taiwanese nationals with household registration when entering other countries.

=== Taiwan ===
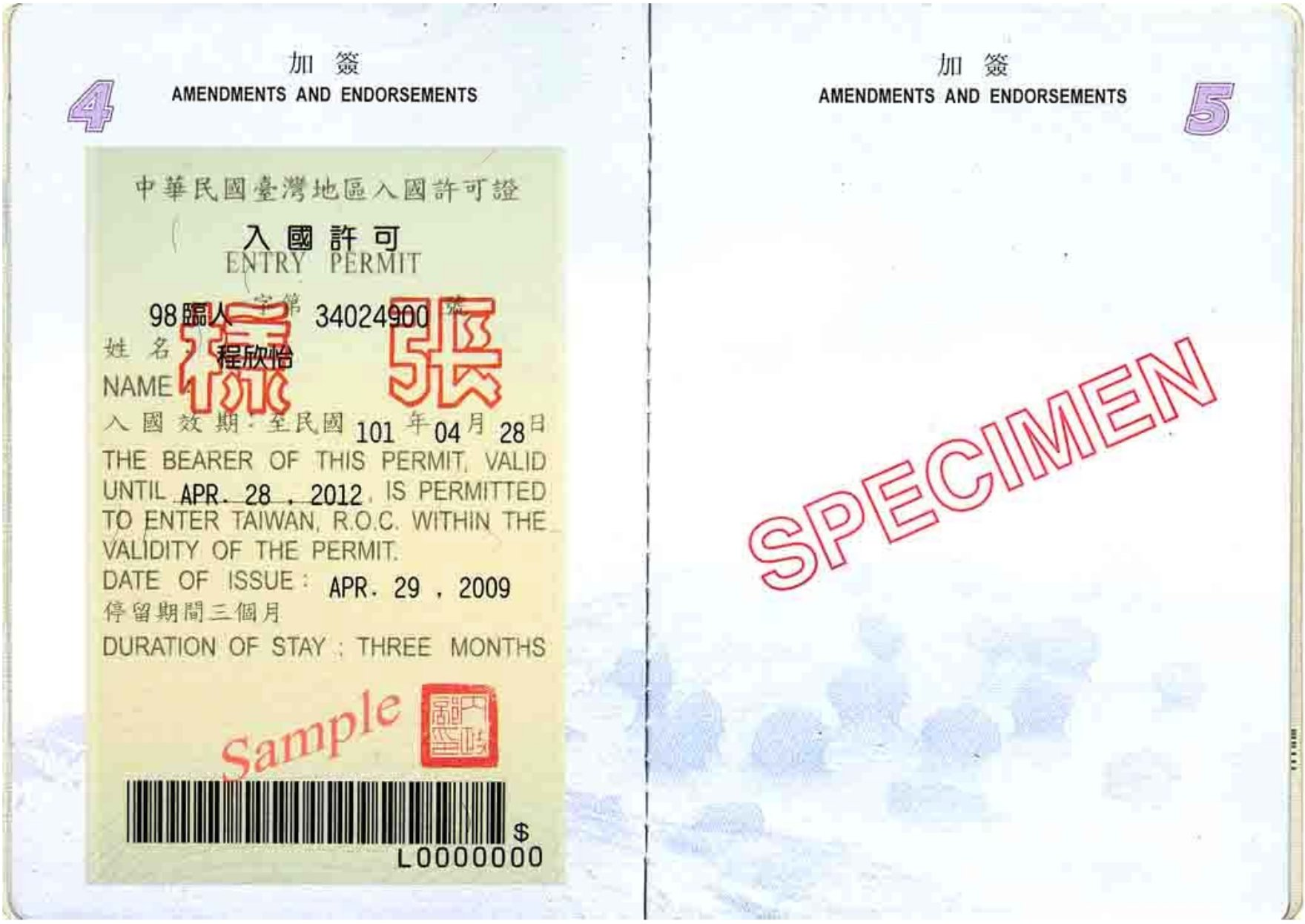
An entry permit attached to a NWOHR's Taiwanese passport with validity of 3 years allowing its holder to visit Taiwan multiple times with each up to three months.

Nationals without household registration may be subject to immigration controls and do not have the right of abode to Taiwan. Starting from January 2024, they may enter ROC-controlled territory with only their biometric NWOHR Taiwanese passports, provided they have a return or onward ticket to a next destination. They can also present separate document with permission to enter Taiwan, such as an Entry Permit issued by a Taiwanese diplomatic mission, or a Resident certificate issued by the National Immigration Agency. With regular Entry Permit, each visit is restricted to three months, which may be extended once per visit for a further three months.

Some specific NWOHRs may be able to apply for temporary entry permit upon arriving Taiwan if they hold an endorsement letter from an Overseas Community Affairs Council certifying their residency overseas, a South Korean Certificate of Alien Registration indicating long-term or permanent residency.

In some special cases, the Taiwanese National Immigration Agency may issue an Exit & Entry Permit for Taiwan to NWOHRs overseas, these permits are valid without having to present a passport.

=== China, Hong Kong, and Macau ===
The Taiwanese passport is not recognized as a valid travel document by the government of China. A lack of household registration in Taiwan and national identification number also disqualifies NWOHRs from obtaining a Mainland Travel Permit for Taiwan Resident. Thus, NWOHRs cannot follow similar procedures like Taiwanese people to enter territories of the People's Republic of China (including mainland China, Hong Kong, and Macau). Instead, NWOHRs must apply for a Chinese Travel Document with a Chinese diplomatic mission in advance before starting their trip to China.

=== Other countries ===
Most visa-free regimes for Taiwanese passport holders are limited to those with right of abode in Taiwan. These include Canada, Japan, Schengen Area, United Kingdom, and United States (Visa Waiver Program). NWOHRs are not eligible for those visa-free regimes. However, there are also visa-free regimes granted to both types of Taiwanese passport holders, such as Ireland and South Korea.
