= APRC =

APRC may refer to:

- Asia-Pacific Rally Championship
- Annual percentage rate of charge, a measure of interest rates
- Alien Permanent Resident Certificate, a resident identification card in China and Taiwan
- Alliance for Patriotic Reorientation and Construction, a political party in the Gambia
