= Household registration in Taiwan =

Civil and family registration system

Household Registration Act (Note: In local languages: Traditional Chinese script: 戶籍法; Mandarin Pinyin: Hùjí Fǎ; Hokkien: Hō͘-che̍k Hoat; Sixian Hakka: Fu-sit Fap)

Legislative Yuan
- Citation: Household Registration Act
- Passed: 1931-12-01
- Commenced: 1931-12-12
- Administered by: Ministry of the Interior

Amends
- 1945-12-14; 1973-07-03; 1997-04-29; 2008-05-09; 2015-01-06
- Status: In force

Household registration (Chinese: 戶籍; pinyin: hùjí; Pe̍h-ōe-jī: hō͘-che̍k) is a Taiwanese civil and family registration system. The modern household registration system was started in early 20th century when Taiwan was under Japanese rule. Currently the system is administered by the Ministry of the Interior. Under Taiwanese law, household registration guarantees an individual the right of abode in Taiwan, and the ability to fully exercise their civil and political rights, such as the right to vote. Thus, the term national with household registration is sometimes used to refer to a citizen in official documents.

== History ==
Early forms of household registration was first established in Dutch Formosa in 1647 by the Dutch East India Company. Later regimes including Kingdom of Tungning and the Qing Taiwan administration maintain similar registers on local family profiles of the Taiwanese people. In these eras, registers on families were also used to organize Taiwanese people to conduct civil defense, known as the Hoko system. The system existed until the era of Japanese rule.

In the early 20th century during Japanese rule, the Government-General of Taiwan started to build very thorough household registration records for both families and persons, like the Koseki system implemented in Mainland Japan. The census in Taiwan was conducted in 1905, with the complete household registration records compiled in the next year according to the new law. The records established in 1906 forms the basis of modern household registration after the World War II until today. In the Japanese era, the household registration was maintained by the Japanese police, applications for registration can also be filed through Hoko offices.

After the World War II, the competent authority household registration moved to civil administration. However, with the large number of refugees from the Chinese Civil War fleeing to Taiwan, the National Identification Card was issued first time in Taiwan in 1949 to enhance social control. Later, with the tension of the Second Taiwan Strait Crisis, the competent authority of the household registration was transferred to the National Police Agency in 1969.

The democratization process in Taiwan started in the early 1990s. Household registration was made independent of the police in July 1992. The nationwide computer system on managing household registration was established in October 1997.

== Current implementation ==
=== Administration ===
The household registration record is administered by the Department of Household Registration (戶政司), Ministry of the Interior in the central government. In all Taiwanese townships, county-administered cities and districts, there is at least one field Household Registration Office (戶政事務所) which accepts applications and registrations from the public.

Registration records were digitized in the early 1990s. The nationwide online Household and Conscription Information System (戶役政資訊系統) was completed in September 1997. The system is maintained by both the Department of Household Registration and National Conscription Agency to serve both the civil registration and conscription in Taiwan.

=== Registration ===
The current Household Registration Act requires reporting of the following status changes:

- Household status change: Initial, separation and combination of household(s)
- Personal status change: (1) Birth, (2) Parentage, (3) Adoption and Adoption Termination, (4) Marriage and Divorce, (5) Legal Guardianship, (6) Assistance, (7) Exercising responsibility of the rights and obligations for minor children, (8) Death and Presumption of Death, (9) Indigenous status and tribe group, and Birth Place Registration
- Personal status of domicile change: (1) Moving-out, (2) Moving-in, (3) Address Alteration

=== Derived documents ===
The household registration authorities also in charge of issuing identity documents for persons and households, important documents includes:

- National identification card: (Note: In local languages: Traditional Chinese script: 國民身份證; Mandarin Pinyin: Guómín Shēnfènzhèng; Hokkien: Kok-bîn Sin-hun-chèng; Sixian Hakka: Koet-mìn Sṳ̂n-fun-chṳn) The identity document card issues to every person who with household registration in Taiwan when the person turns 14. The ID card is often used as proof of citizenship in circumstances like voting in national and local elections, and an ID number is needed for tax reporting or open bank accounts. The ID card also have limited ability to verify the person's close relatives, including parents, spouse, and siblings.
- Household certificate: (Note: In local languages: Traditional Chinese script: 戶口名簿; Mandarin Pinyin: Hùkǒu Míngbù; Hokkien: Hō͘-kháu Miâ-phō͘; Sixian Hakka: Fu-khiéu Miàng-phû) The identity document issued to every household. The certificate is usually used to verify the identity of children under 14, or as proof of relationship or domicile address in some applications.
- Household registration transcript: (Note: In local languages: Traditional Chinese script: 戶籍謄本; Mandarin Pinyin: Hùjí Téngběn; Hokkien: Hō͘-che̍k Thêng-pún; Sixian Hakka: Fu-sit Thèn-pún) The official copy of household registration records. It has the same format as the Household Certificate. Usually served as the one-time proof of relationship or domicile address in some applications.

Other official copy of specific household registration records, including marriage certificate, divorce certificate, records of marriage, records of address changes, records of name changes are also available to apply in a Household Registration Office.

== Household registration and citizenship ==
Under Taiwanese law, household registration guarantees an individual the right of abode in Taiwan, and the ability to fully exercise their civil and political rights, such as the right to vote. Thus, the term national with household registration is sometimes used to refer to a citizen in official documents.

Note that under the current Taiwanese nationality law, a person with Taiwanese nationality does not necessarily have household registration. Although a national without household registration is eligible to apply for a Taiwan passport, these passports differ from those issued to Taiwanese citizens with the former having far more restrictions than the latter.

If the spouse of an ROC national is a resident of the People's Republic of China (PRC), they can obtain household registration in Taiwan in approximately six years without acquiring ROC nationality first. Spouses who are nationals of other countries need to become naturalized ROC nationals first after having resided in Taiwan for three years. It then takes an additional one to five years for them to become eligible for household registration in Taiwan.

== See also ==
- Hukou system
- Resident Certificate
