= Taiwan passport =

Travel document issued to Taiwanese citizens

Republic of China passport 中華民國護照
- A front cover for the current, 2021 version of Republic of China's biometric passport

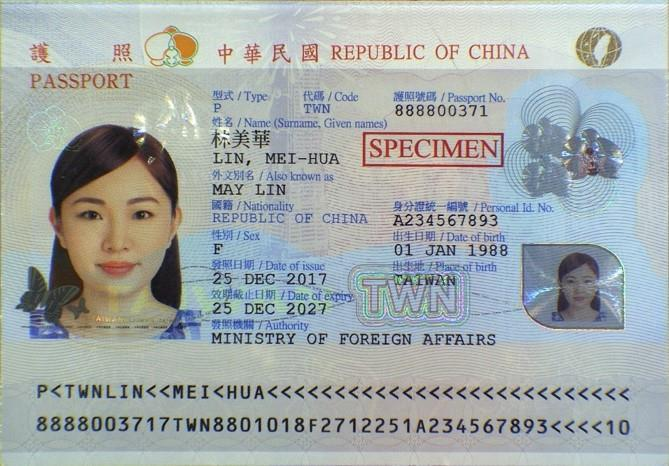
- Data page of a second generation biometric passport
- Type: Passport
- Issued by: Ministry of Foreign Affairs and Interior (in the Taiwan area); Taipei Economic and Cultural Representative Offices and diplomatic embassies/consulates (Abroad)
- First issued: 1912 (first version; Beiyang Government); 1929 (booklet); 1945 (in Taiwan); January 1995 (machine-readable passport); 29 December 2008 (first biometric passport); December 2017 (second biometric passport); 11 January 2021 (current version)
- Purpose: Identification
- Valid in: All jurisdictions except mainland China, Georgia, Jamaica, Venezuela, Moldova, Ascension Island
- Eligibility: Nationality law of Republic of China
- Expiration: 3–10 years
- Cost: NT$900–1,300

The Republic of China (Taiwan) passport (Note: Chinese: 中華民國護照; Hanyu Pinyin: Zhōnghuá Mínguó hùzhào; Tongyong Pinyin: Jhong-huá Mín-guó hù-jhào; Pe̍h-ōe-jī: Tiong-hûa Bîn-kok hō͘-chiàu) is the passport issued to nationals of the Republic of China (ROC, commonly known as Taiwan). The ROC passport is also generally referred to as a Taiwanese passport. (Note: Chinese: 臺灣護照; Hanyu Pinyin: Táiwān hùzhào; Tongyong Pinyin: Tái-wan hù-jhào; Pe̍h-ōe-jī: Tâi-oân hō͘-chiàu) In September 2020, approximately 60.87 percent of Taiwanese citizens possessed a valid passport. All passports issued in Taiwan since 2008 have been biometric.

The validity and international recognition of Taiwan passports are complicated due to the ongoing dispute over political status of Taiwan as well as the history of the Republic of China since the country had once controlled the territories of today's People's Republic of China (PRC) and Mongolia. In the past, all subjects and their offspring related to the historical or current territories of the ROC were eligible to be admitted for the passport. However, constitutional reforms in the 1990s and 2000s restricted citizenship rights only to those with household registration in Taiwan. Taiwanese government currently recognizes that foreign nationals with Taiwanese or Chinese descent must meet certain conditions to be eligible to obtain a passport, but do not have household registration in Taiwan (i.e. they are "nationals without household registration", or "NWOHR"), and thus do not enjoy the right of abode in Taiwan. (Note: Lack of right of abode means that the passport holder cannot be deported to the issuing country of the passport. Similar examples include British Overseas Citizens who do not have the right of abode in the United Kingdom.) Countries granting visa-free privileges to Taiwan passport holders often require a Taiwanese National ID number imprinted on the passport's biodata page, which signifies the holder's right of abode in Taiwan.

The Republic of China (Taiwan) passport is one of five passports with the most improved rating globally since 2006 in terms of the number of countries that its holders may visit without a visa. As of September 2020, holders of ordinary Republic of China passports (for ROC nationals with Taiwan area household registration who therefore possess right of abode in Taiwan and also the right to obtain a National Identity Card) had visa-free or visa on arrival access to 150 countries and territories, with 20 additional countries granting electronic visas, ranking the Republic of China (Taiwan) passport 32nd in the world in terms of freedom of travel (tied with the Mauritius and St. Vincent and the Grenadines passports), according to the Henley Passport Index 2020.

== Passport appearance ==
=== First generation biometric passport ===
The first generation of biometric passports were introduced on 29 December 2008. The ROC became the 60th country in the world to issue biometric passports when they were introduced.

==== Cover ====
The cover of the ordinary Republic of China (Taiwan) passport is dark green, with the ROC national emblem – Blue Sky with a White Sun – in the middle. On the top is the official name of the country, "REPUBLIC OF CHINA", in Traditional Chinese characters. It is also written in English in fine print circling the national emblem. Below the national emblem, the word "TAIWAN" is printed in English only and "PASSPORT" is printed in both Traditional Chinese and English. At the bottom is the biometric passport symbol.

==== Request page ====
The first page of the passport is the passport note page and printed with the following request, anti-counterfeiting printing shows the shape of the island of Taiwan at the top and word TAIWAN at the bottom.
In Traditional Chinese:

中華民國外交部部長茲請各國有關機關對持用本護照之中華民國國民允予自由通行，並請必要時儘量予以協助及保護。

In English:

The Minister of Foreign Affairs of the Republic of China requests all whom it may concern to permit the national of the Republic of China named herein to pass freely and in case of need to give all possible aid and protection.

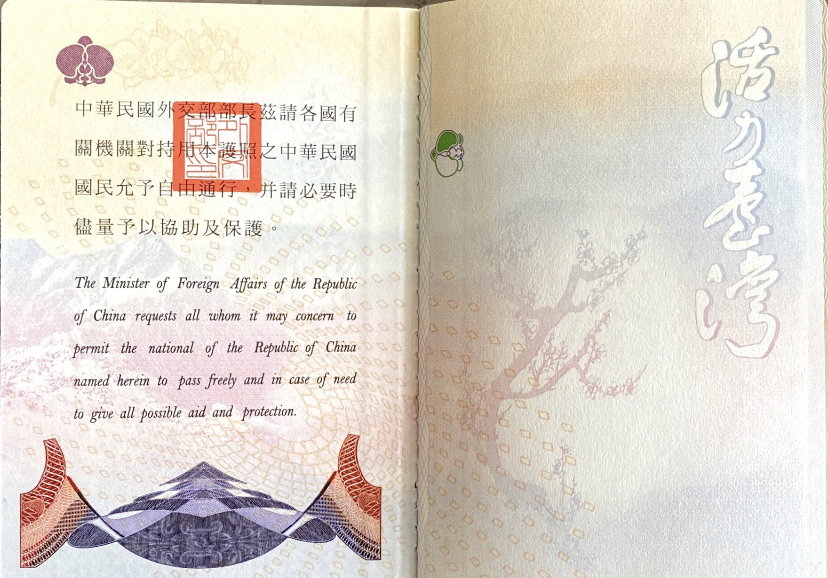
Request page of a Taiwan passport.

==== Data page ====
A sample ROC (Taiwan) passport data page
護 照 PASSPORT	中 華 民 國 REPUBLIC OF CHINA
Photo	形式/Type; P	代碼/Code; TWN	護照號碼/Passport No. 300000000
Photo	姓名/Name (Surname, Given names) 中文姓名; XXXX, XXXX-XXXX
Photo	外文別名/Also Known As; XXXXXXX XXXX
Photo	國籍/Nationality; REPUBLIC OF CHINA		身分證統一編號/Personal Id. No. A000000000
Photo	性別/Sex; M		出生日期/Date of birth 01 SEP 2003	Second; Photo
Photo	發照日期/Date of issue 29 DEC 2008		出生地/Place of birth TAIWAN	Second; Photo
Photo	效期截止日期/Date of expiry 29 DEC 2018			Second; Photo
Photo	發照機關/Authority; MINISTRY OF FOREIGN AFFAIRS			Second; Photo
P<TWNXXXX<<XXXX<XXXX<<<<<<<<<<<<<<<<<<<<<<<< 3000000003TWN0309010M1812290A000000000<<<<00

Personal biodata page information for the passport holder and the machine readable zone are listed below.

Data	Description
Type	P for ordinary passports, PO for official passports, PD for diplomatic passports
Code	TWN, the ISO country code for Republic of China
Passport No.	a nine digit number, biometric passports start with 3
Name	both Chinese characters and romanization
Also Known As	only available for people with alias in other languages
Nationality	REPUBLIC OF CHINA
Personal Id. No.	Taiwanese National ID number, not available for NWOHRs
Sex	M for male, F for female
Date of birth	DD MMM YYYY
Date of issue	DD MMM YYYY
Place of birth	the name of a province or special municipality if born in Taiwan or China, or a foreign country if born abroad. For example: TAIWAN, FUKIEN, TAIPEI CITY, NEW TAIPEI CITY, TAOYUAN CITY, TAICHUNG CITY, TAINAN CITY, KAOHSIUNG CITY, USA
Date of expiry	DD MMM YYYY
Authority	MINISTRY OF FOREIGN AFFAIRS for passports issued by the MOFA, or the name of the issuing diplomatic mission for passports issued by a Taiwanese mission abroad. All biometric passports are issued by the MOFA in Taiwan regardless of the actual place of application.

The biodata page is protected by a plastic anti-counterfeiting layer with laser holograms of the country code TWN and broad-tailed swallowtail butterfly, an endemic species of Taiwan.

Following the passage of an amendment to Article 14 of the Enforcement Rules of the Passport Act on 9 August 2019, romanization can take place from any of Taiwan's national languages, which include Hakka, Hoklo, and Formosan languages spoken by indigenous peoples.

==== Inner pages ====
The inner pages of a Republic of China (Taiwan) passport are in light purple. Its contents are:

- Personal data page in page 2
- Signature in page 3
- Amendments and endorsements from page 4 to page 7
- Visa pages from page 8 to page 47
- Remark pages from page 48 to page 50

Selected nature hotspots and famous sights of Taiwan are printed in the inner pages, each page also contains a transparent watermark of Jade Mountain, the highest peak of the country.

Page	Theme	Division	Page	Theme	Division
2	Airport and Taiwan High Speed Rail transportations	N/A	26, 27	Alishan National Scenic Area and Alishan Forest Railway	Chiayi County
3	Electronics industry in Taiwan	N/A	28, 29	Rice agriculture in Chianan Plain	Chiayi County
4, 5	Yehliu Scenic Area	New Taipei City	30, 31	Salt evaporation ponds in Cigu District	Tainan City
6, 7	Guandu Bridge and Bali District	New Taipei City	32, 33	Eternal Golden Castle and Fort Provintia	Tainan City
8, 9	National Palace Museum	Taipei City	34, 35	Port of Kaohsiung	Kaohsiung City
10, 11	Taipei 101 and Taipei metro area	Taipei City	36, 37	Oil-paper umbrella of Meinong District	Kaohsiung City
12, 13	Suspension bridge of Bitan	New Taipei City	38, 39	Kenting National Park and Eluanbi Lighthouse	Pingtung County
14, 15	Tea harvest in northern Taiwan	Hsinchu County	40, 41	Orchid Island and Tao People	Taitung County
16, 17	Dabajian Mountain in Shei-Pa National Park	Miaoli County	42, 43	Taroko National Park and Central Cross-Island Highway	Hualien County
18, 19	Formosan landlocked salmon	Taichung City	44, 45	Chingshui Cliff	Hualien County
20, 21	Taichung Park	Taichung City	46, 47	Guishan Island and Cetaceas	Yilan County
22, 23	Sun Moon Lake	Nantou County	48, 49	Volcanic geology	Penghu County
24, 25	Jade Mountain in Yushan National Park	Nantou County	50	Shisa	Kinmen County

==== Back cover ====
A contactless biometric chip is embedded in the back cover page, with the warning as follows.
In Traditional Chinese:

本護照內植高感度電子晶片，使用上請視同攜帶式電子產品，並妥善保管。為維持護照最佳效能，請勿折壓、扭曲或在內頁穿孔、裝訂；並勿將護照曝曬於陽光下，或置於高溫、潮濕及電磁環境，或沾染化學藥品。

In English:

This passport contains a sensitive electronic chip, and should be treated with great care in the same way as a portable electronic device. For best performance, please do not bend, twist, perforate or staple the passport. Neither expose it to direct sunlight, extreme temperature or humidity. Avoid electro-magnetic fields or chemical substance.

DO NOT STAMP THIS PAGE

=== Second generation biometric passport ===
The second generation biometric passport has been issued since 5 February 2018. It was originally scheduled to be rolled out on 25 December 2017, however the rollout was suspended a day later and did not resume until 5 February 2018 due to the Dulles Airport image controversy.

== Types of passports ==
The Passport Act provides for three types of passports, all issued by the Bureau of Consular Affairs of the Ministry of Foreign Affairs.

Passport types of the Republic of China (Taiwan)
Cover	Colour	Type	Description
Front cover of the Republic of China (Taiwan) ordinary passport, 2021 design	Dark green	Ordinary passport	Issued to nationals of the Republic of China for general international travel. Valid for up to ten years, or up to five years for holders under the age of 14.
Front cover of the Republic of China (Taiwan) official passport, 2021 design	Brown	Official passport	Issued to government personnel stationed abroad or travelling abroad on official business and their eligible dependents, and to nationals of the Republic of China serving in intergovernmental organizations. Valid for up to five years.
Front cover of the Republic of China (Taiwan) diplomatic passport, 2021 design	Dark navy blue	Diplomatic passport	Issued to the president and vice president, diplomatic and consular personnel, government dignitaries on diplomatic missions, diplomatic couriers, and their eligible dependents. Valid for up to five years.

== Passport regulations for nationals with household registration ==
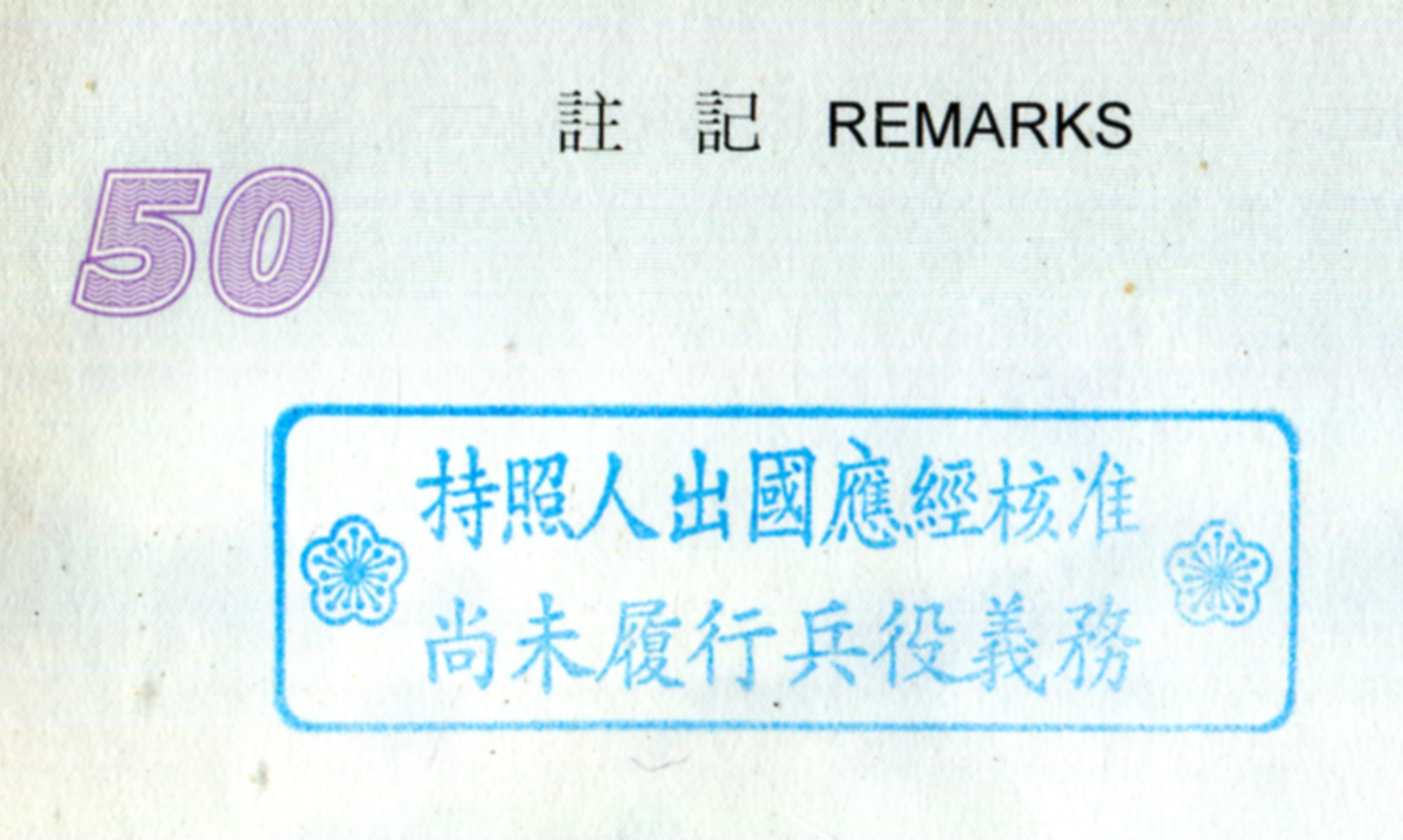
Military service uncompleted remarks on the remarks page.

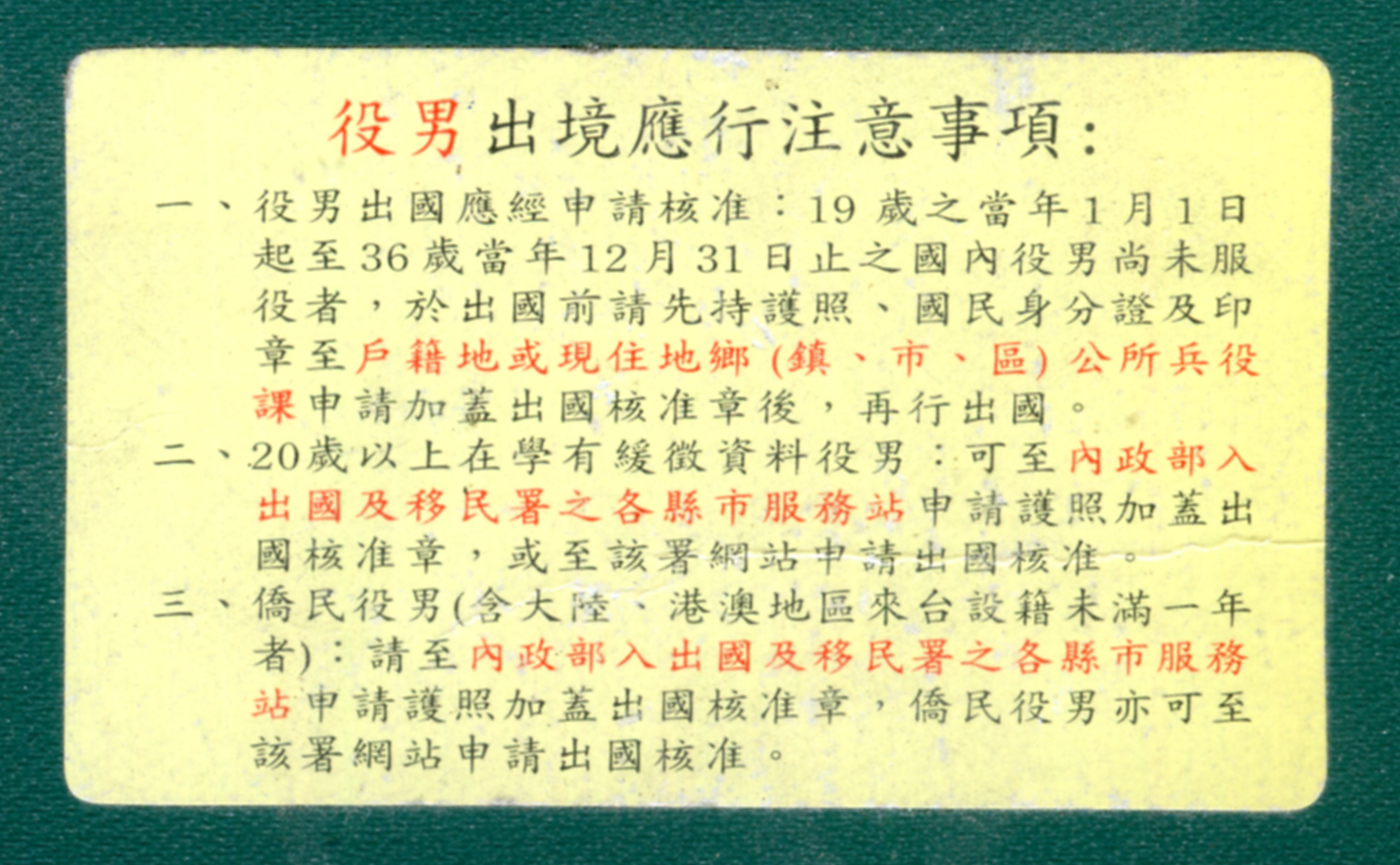
Departure Notice for men of conscription age on the back cover.

Nationals with household registration in the Taiwan Area may apply for passports from the Bureau of Consular Affairs (BOCA) in Taipei or its branch offices in Kaohsiung, Hualien, Chiayi and Taichung with the following documents:

- Application form
- National Identification Card
- Two photos (3.5 × 4.5 cm)

First time applicants are required to submit their documents in person to the BOCA headquarters or a BOCA branch.

- Processing time: Four working days.
- Validity period: Starting from 21 May 2000, the validity period for an ordinary passport is generally 10 years and 1 day but for applicants aged under 15, it is 5 years and for male citizens who have not completed their conscription duty it is only 3 years.
- Application fee: Effective since 1 January 2013, the application fee for a 10-year passport is NT$1,300; for a passport with restricted validity period is NT$900. In comparison, the cost of manufacturing a passport is NT$1,361, regardless of the validity period.

Due to mandatory military service for men, travel restrictions are placed on male citizens from the age of 15 until they have completed their military service before 29 April 2019. When a passport is issued to a such citizen, a stamp with the following words will be shown on the remarks page, and a sticker which describes the regulation will be attached to the back cover of the passport.
In Traditional Chinese:

持照人出國應經核准，尙未履行兵役義務。

Translation: The bearer needs a permission to travel abroad and has not yet completed his military service.

Before traveling, the holder needs to apply for permission to travel overseas with the National Immigration Agency or the conscription administration near his residence. Permission is granted in the form of a stamp on the remarks page, including the expiration date and the issuing authority.

After 29 Apr 2019, the Ministry of the Interior lifted the limitation of stamping on the passport to streamline the government process and digitalization. However, citizens who have not completed their military service still have to apply for permission before departure.

== Passport regulations for nationals without household registration ==
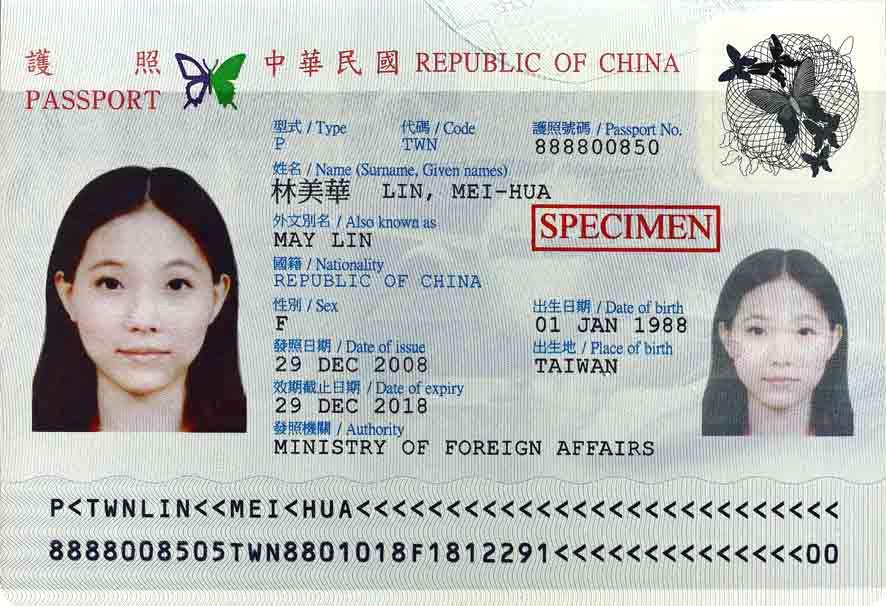
The ROC passport of a national without household registration does not have an identification card number listed on its data pages in the empty spaces labeled (1).

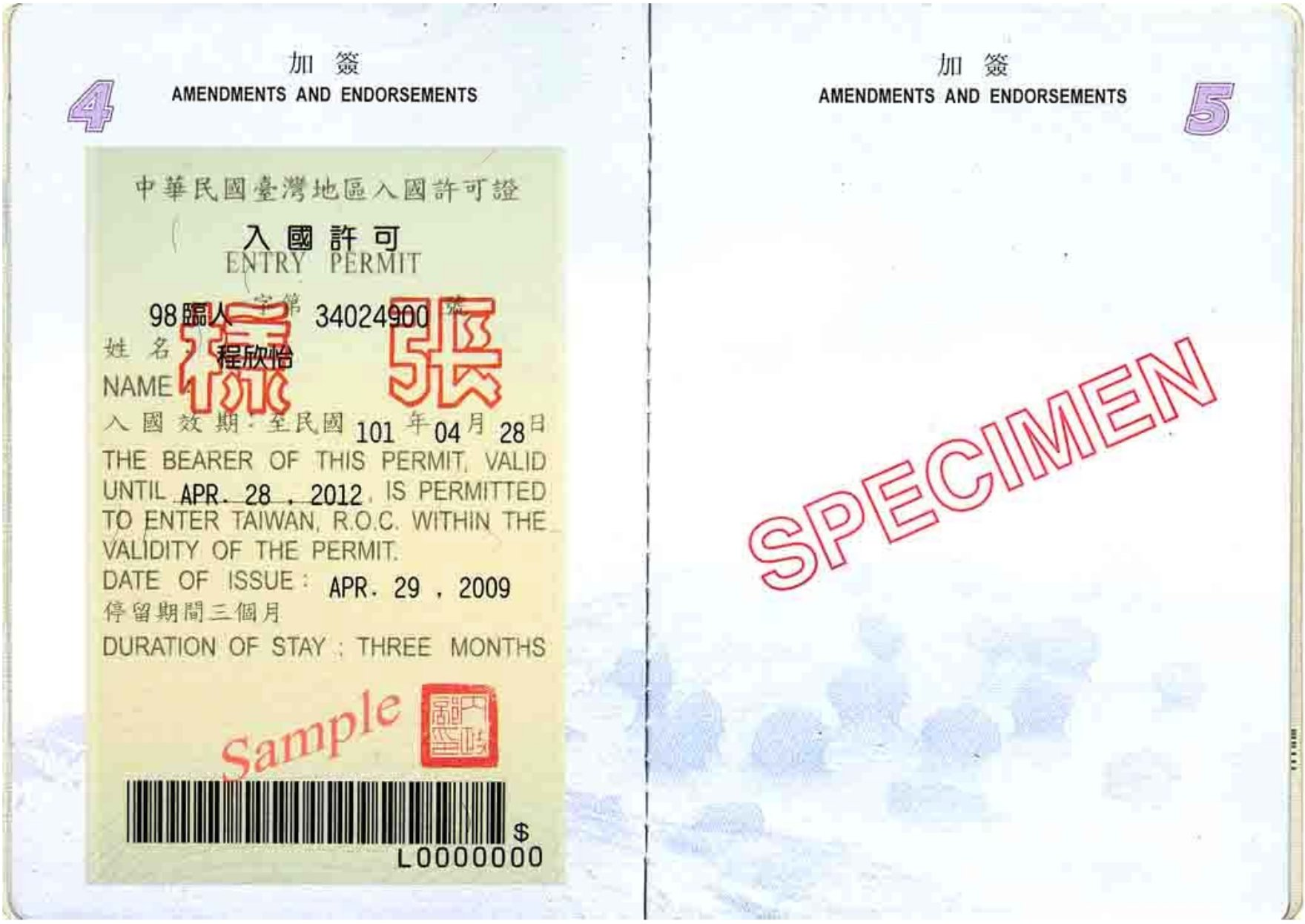
An Entry permit for NWOHR, which is mandatory for entering Taiwan

Around 60,000 Taiwan passport holders are NWOHRs, accounting for approximately 0.5% of total valid passports. NWOHRs are overseas nationals without household registration in Taiwan, and hence do not have the right of abode in Taiwan, Penghu, Kinmen, Matsu and other outlying islands.

=== Application ===
Overseas nationals can only apply for a passport from an embassy, consulate or Taipei Economic and Cultural Representative Office near their residing country with the following document.

- Application form
- A certificate of nationality of the Republic of China (Taiwan)
- Two photos (3.5 × 4.5 cm)

The Republic of China nationality law adopts the jus sanguinis principle. The applicant's nationality may be established through ancestral ties. Various documents may be used as proof, see the eligibility paragraph for more information thereto.

- Application fee: For a 10-year passport is US$45, for a passport with restricted validity period is US$31.

=== Travel requirements and limitations ===
Unlike residents of Taiwan, NWOHRs do not automatically have right of abode in Taiwan. They are required to apply for an entry permit to enter Taiwan prior to their travel if they are not exempted. The application must be submitted to the embassy, consulate or Taipei Economic and Cultural Representative Office of their country of residence. Once the application is approved, a visa-like permit will be affixed on the visa page.

- This legal situation is similar to British Overseas Citizens, who have no automatic right of abode in the United Kingdom or any other British dependency or territory.
- In the United States, passports without a National ID number (without unrestricted right to enter and/or reside in Taiwan) do not satisfy the definition of a passport under INA 101(a)(30), because NWOHRs do not have the right of abode in Taiwan. Bearers of such passports are considered stateless for visa issuing purposes.

Page 50 of NWOHR passports show the following words in ink.
In Traditional Chinese:

本護照不適用部分國家之免簽證計劃。

In English:

This passport is not eligible for visa waiver programs of some countries according to their regulations.

Both NWHR and NWOHR passport holders can apply for a special stamp known as the Overseas Chinese endorsement, subject to some conditions such as citizenship/permanent residency in a foreign country and/or some prescribed period of residency outside of Taiwan. The primary usage in practice of this stamp is that it allows male NWHRs to indefinitely defer military service, so long as they do not return to Taiwan to take residence, which invalidates the Overseas Chinese status. The specific conditions that will trigger the loss of said status depends on the holder's year of birth.

=== Eligibility for Taiwan passports ===
The ROC was founded in 1912 governing mainland China while Taiwan was part of Japan. The earliest verifiable ROC passports were issued by the Beiyang Government in Beijing in September 1919, and an ROC passport booklet was first issued by Beiyang Foreign Minister Wellington Koo Wei-chun in April 1922. After the surrender of the Japanese Empire in 1945, the Republic of China was given administrative jurisdiction over Taiwan and maintained control of it ever since. At the end of the Chinese Civil War in 1949, the ROC lost its control of mainland China to the Chinese Communist Party, which established the People's Republic of China (PRC). Henceforth, the ROC has been able to administer only Taiwan and some islands off the mainland's coast. Maintaining the view that it is still the legitimate government of the whole of China, the ROC does not formally recognize the legitimacy of PRC. It has also constitutionally defined all the territory under its control as the "Free Area" (or the "Taiwan Area") and the territory outside Taiwan Area as the "Mainland Area". The ROC constitution allows the ROC government to make laws for one Area of the country without affecting the other Area..

However, permanent residents in the Mainland Area, Hong Kong or Macau are not generally eligible to obtain a ROC passport [Passport Act, Article 6]. Furthermore, Overseas Chinese applicants normally must submit one of the following forms of proof of ROC nationality [Passport Act Enforcement Rules, Article 4]:

- A ROC passport;
- A Certificate of Overseas Chinese status, issued on the basis of proof of ROC nationality;
- Proof of ROC nationality for a parent or ancestor, together with proof of descent.

As the first ROC nationality law, in effect from 5 February 1929 to 9 February 2000, only permitted ROC national fathers to pass nationality down to the descendants, any person who was born on or before 9 February 1980 to an ROC national mother and a foreign father is not a ROC national, regardless of place of birth.

There are certain exceptions to this in certain cases for first and second generation emigrants, but in general an applicant will be unable to obtain a ROC passport unless he already holds ROC-issued nationality documentation for himself or an ancestor.

Therefore, for a person to obtain a ROC passport, one of the following must normally apply:

- The person first obtained proof of ROC nationality before 1949, when the ROC controlled the Mainland Area; or
- The person first obtained a ROC passport or a Certificate of Overseas Chinese status before 1 July 1997 as a resident of Hong Kong, or before 20 December 1999 as resident of Macau; or
- The person first obtained a ROC passport before 2002, as an Overseas-born Chinese, on the basis of Chinese ethnicity, before the Passport Act Enforcement Rules were revised to prevent this; or
- The person obtained an ROC passport after emigrating overseas from the Mainland Area [Passport Act Enforcement Rules, Article 18]; or
- The person obtained an ROC passport after emigrating overseas from Hong Kong or Macau, whilst not holding a foreign passport other than a BN(O) passport [Passport Act Enforcement Rules, Article 19], or after being born overseas to a parent who so emigrated; or
- The person has an ancestor in one of the previous categories (i.e. the ancestor actually obtained the ROC document, as opposed to merely having the right to do so), and the chain of descent is through the male line until 9 February 1980 (afterwards the chain of descent can be through the mother or father).

The interior is in traditional Chinese characters and English. Until the mid-1990s, the passport also contained an entry for provincial ancestry (籍貫), stating the Chinese province and county of one's ancestral home, but this field has been eliminated. However, the Chinese province or county of birth is still listed in the birthplace entry if the passport holder was born in either mainland China or Taiwan.

== Visa requirements ==
Map of visa requirements for Taiwanese citizens Taiwan Taiwan compatriot permit or Chinese travel document required Visa not required Visa on arrival eVisa Visa available both on arrival or online Visa required Admission refused

Visa requirements for Taiwan passport holders are administrative entry restrictions by the authorities of other states placed on nationals of Taiwan. As of 7 January 2020, holders of ordinary Taiwan passports (for ROC nationals with Taiwan area household registration who therefore possess right of abode in Taiwan and also the right to obtain a National Identity Card) had visa-free or visa on arrival access to 146 countries and territories, ranking the Taiwan passport 32nd in the world in terms of travel freedom (tied with the Mauritius and St. Vincent and the Grenadines passports), according to the Henley Passport Index 2020. (Note: The Republic of China Ministry of Foreign Affairs, however, lists 167 countries with visa-free or visa on arrival access, which included a large number of countries requiring pre-arrival documentations such as invitations or visa approval letters (such as Kazakhstan, Uzbekistan and Vietnam). Such countries are not considered as providing visa-free or visa-on-arrival access, since the visa is usually approved before arrival and during the process of obtaining such documentations.) Additionally, Arton Capital's Passport Index ranked the ordinary Taiwan passport 30th in the world in terms of travel freedom, with a visa-free score of 135 (tied with Panamanian passports), as of 12 January 2020.

Visa requirements for ROC nationals without household registration (NWOHR), i.e., nationals of Taiwan who do not possess right of abode in Taiwan and hence ineligible for a National Identity Card, are different. Unlike ROC nationals with household registration in Taiwan, NWOHRs cannot apply for the Australian Electronic Travel Authority (ETA) and must instead apply for a subclass 600 visa in order to visit Australia. NWOHRs also require visas to visit Bosnia and Herzegovina, Canada, Israel, Japan, New Zealand, the Schengen Area (including future member state Cyprus), the United Kingdom and the United States (where NWOHRs are considered stateless and their visas issued on a separate form). When visiting Singapore, NWOHRs are required to present proof of a valid Taiwanese re-entry permit.

=== Limitations in usage ===
Even though the Republic of China maintains official relations with only 12 countries, the ROC passport is still accepted as a valid travel document in most countries of the world. Although Taiwanese enjoy visa-free status in 148 countries, some countries, pursuant to their policies on Taiwan's political status, refuse to endorse or stamp ROC passports, and instead issue visas on a separate travel document or a separate piece of paper to Taiwanese travelers to avoid conveying any kind of diplomatic recognition to the ROC. The chart below only lists countries or territories which explicitly state that ROC passports are not accepted, while also requiring a visa or entry permit for ROC nationals prior to arrival.

Country	Restrictions
Ascension Island	Since May 2015, the Ascension Island Government does not issue entry visas including e-Visas to citizens of Taiwan.
China	ROC passports are not recognised or accepted. ROC nationals with right of abode in Taiwan are required to apply for a Mainland Travel Permit for Taiwan Residents (a credit card sized travel document). For those without right of abode in Taiwan, a passport-like Chinese Travel Document is required.
Georgia	ROC passports are neither recognised or accepted for entry or transit. (Visas can still be obtained on a case-by-case basis for Taiwanese passport holders, including for participation in international conferences and sports events held in Georgia.)
Jamaica	ROC passports are not recognised. Must hold an Affidavit of Identity issued by Jamaica in addition to the ROC passport.
Kiribati	Due to influence of the Chinese government, Kiribati no longer recognizes Taiwanese passports and therefore does not issue visas to Taiwanese citizens (for business and tourism). This means that Taiwanese citizens will not be able to enter Kiribati.
Moldova	ROC passports are neither recognised or accepted for entry or transit.
Venezuela	Due to influence of the Chinese government, Venezuela no longer recognizes Taiwanese passports and therefore does not issue visas to Taiwanese citizens (for business and tourism). This means that Taiwanese citizens will not be able to enter Venezuela.

== Controversies ==
=== "Republic of Taiwan" sticker ===
In 2015, a pro-independence activist, Denis Chen, designed the Taiwan Passport Sticker (Republic of Taiwan sticker) to be placed on the front cover of ROC passports. The stickers re-brand the country's name as 「臺灣國」 (lit. 'State of Taiwan') and "Republic of Taiwan", as well as replacing the existing national emblem of a Blue Sky with a White Sun with cartoons either of Jade Mountain, a Formosan black bear, or pro-democracy activist Cheng Nan-jung.

Although applauded by pro-independence supporters, this move caused controversies in Taiwan's neighboring countries and regions, as well as the United States, since the alteration of passport covers might be a violation of immigration laws in other countries or regions and eventually cause the refusal of entry to holders of such passports.

Singapore was the first country in Asia to deny entry to holders of altered passports on 29 November 2015, and deported three ROC nationals for "altering their travel documents". Among the three, two immediately removed the Republic of Taiwan stickers upon the further inquiries by the Immigration and Checkpoints Authority (ICA) officers, but were eventually deported by Singapore to Taiwan. Another person had refused to remove such stickers and instead requested diplomatic representatives of Taiwan for consular protection, but was also deported in the end by ICA. The two Special Administrative Regions of China, Hong Kong and Macau, soon followed suit and refused to accept holders of such passports for entry. A spokesperson of Hong Kong Immigration Department said that any person who "altered the travel document without lawful authority, or, who possess or use altered travel document", is a violation of Immigration Ordinance and can be sentenced for up to 14 years in prison.

The American Institute in Taiwan (AIT) had, through diplomatic channels, notified the MOFA and confirmed that holders of such altered passports may be extensively questioned by the U.S. Customs and Border Protection (CBP) officers and be removed from the United States, and in March 2016, two travelers from Taiwan voluntarily removed Republic of Taiwan stickers because of the extensive questioning by CBP officers. The two travelers were eventually admitted into the U.S., while a CBP spokesperson warned that alterations of travel documents made by any person who is not authorized by the government of a country can render it invalid and will result the holder's refusal of admission to the U.S., and placing Republic of Taiwan stickers on passports is deemed to have altered the travel documents. A similar incident also occurred in Japan when a holder of altered passport was subject to secondary inspection. After being told that he would be deported, the man finally removed the Republic of Taiwan stickers and placed them on his T-shirt. Afterwards, he was allowed into Japan.

Supporters of the stickers claimed that passports with Republic of Taiwan stickers were accepted in the United Arab Emirates and in Japan. In the latter case, the person who placed a Republic of Taiwan sticker on his passport claimed that he was simply trying to block the word "China" from his passport. Holders of such passports were also allowed entry into the Philippines, although a Bureau of Immigration (BI) spokesperson claimed that the passenger would normally be thoroughly inspected and called the incident "a serious matter", while also said that the government would launch an investigation.

According to the BOCA, a total of 21 people had been denied entry by Singapore, Macau and Hong Kong since the end of 2015. Incidents were also reported in Japan and the U.S. of the use of Republic of Taiwan stickers. The MOFA called upon travelers to not alter the cover of their travel documents so that they would not be denied entry.

From 2020, such problems have largely ceased to exist after the Taiwanese government issued new versions of passports that have reduced "Republic of China" to small texts surrounding the national emblem, and highlighted "Taiwan" instead.

=== Dulles Airport image incident ===
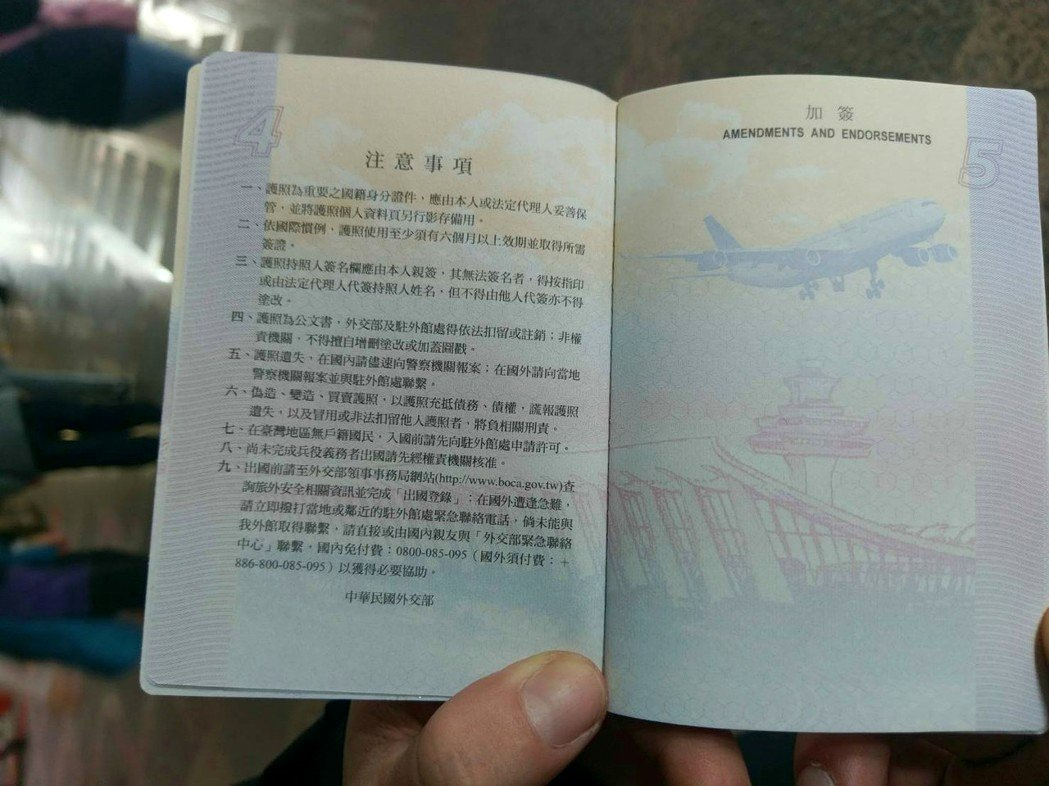
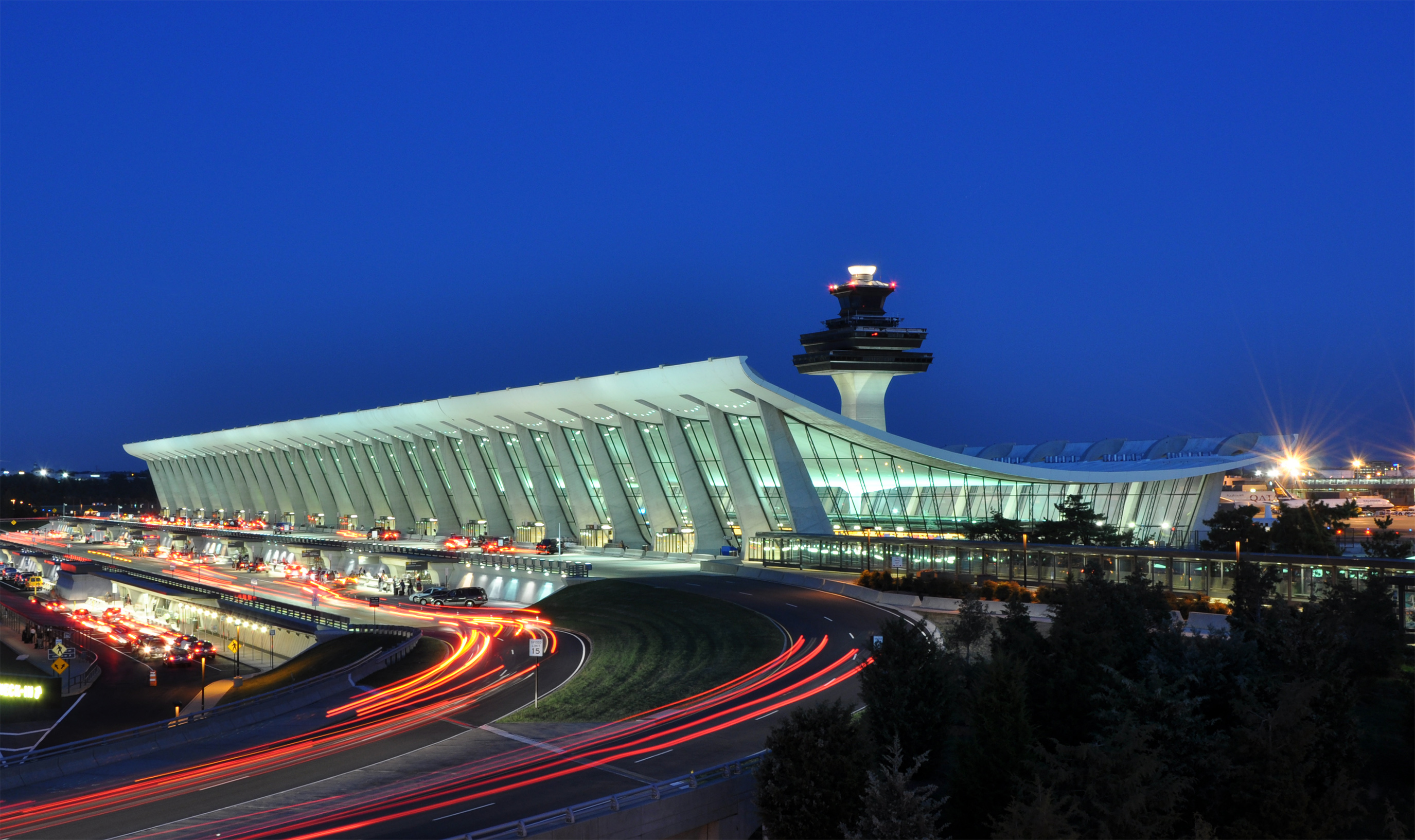
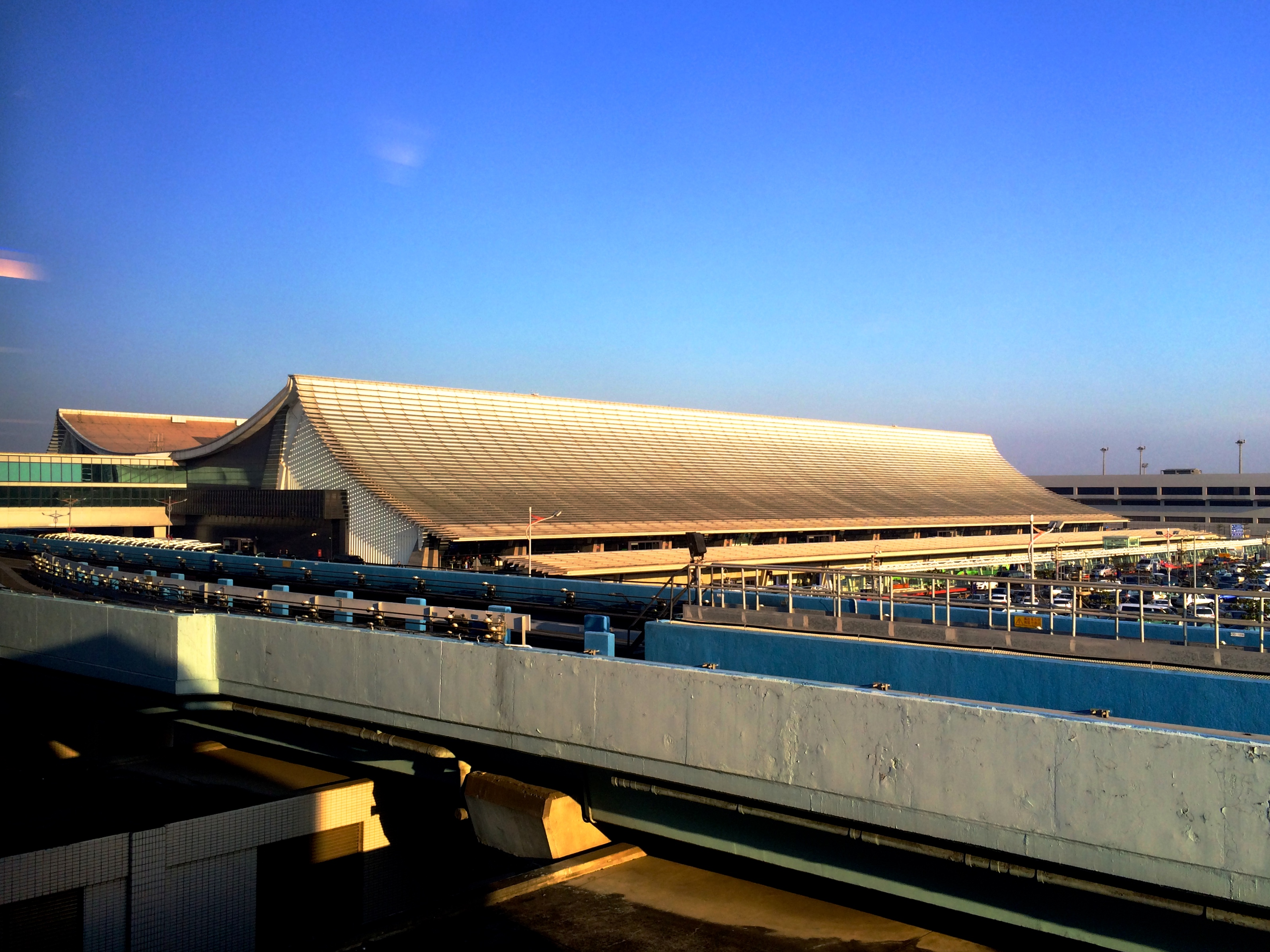
The image of Washington Dulles International Airport in page 5 of the first batch of the second-generation ROC passport (top), in comparison to the actual Saarinen-designed Dulles main terminal building and control tower (bottom-left) and the renovated Dan-redesigned Taoyuan Terminal 1 (bottom-right).

Page 5 of the redesigned second generation biometric passport, originally scheduled to roll out on 25 December 2017, was to feature an image of the iconic terminal 1 of Taiwan Taoyuan International Airport, a project of Chinese-American architect Tung-Yen Lin completed in 1979. On the same day, however, netizens on Facebook noticed that a picture of the main terminal of Washington Dulles International Airport was used on page 5 instead. Dulles's terminal, which was completed in 1962 and designed by renowned architect Eero Saarinen, had greatly inspired Lin's design of terminal 1, hence the two buildings bear a high degree of similarity.

The MOFA initially dismissed the reports in the morning of 26 December when a spokesperson of the ministry claimed that the photo was taken at Taoyuan Airport. Nearly 12 hours would pass before the MOFA acknowledged the error and stated that over 220,000 new passports were printed and delivered by the Central Engraving and Printing Plant (CEPP) and 285 of them, which were already recalled, had been delivered to applicants by the time the mistake was discovered. BOCA chief Agnes Chen took responsibility and resigned on 27 December as the rollout of the new passport was halted, and applicants were issued first generation biometric passports instead. It was later reported that an extra 330,000 undelivered blank booklets were already printed by the CEPP, bringing the number of total affected booklets to more than 550,000, and destroying those would cost the government NT$220 million. To reduce costs, the MOFA decided to print new stickers with the correct building which would cover page 5 and turn it into a travel warnings page from a blank amendment/endorsement page, a move that will cost a much smaller NT$16 million. In January 2018, the CEPP had also agreed to cover the NT$9.9 million manufacturing cost of the undelivered 330,000 booklets.

The second generation biometric passport with stickers on page 5 was officially rolled out on 5 February 2018, more than a month behind the original schedule, to ameliorate the controversy. MOFA confirmed that it had notified immigration authorities of foreign countries so that holders of passports with the sticker would not encounter difficulties when travelling. Two months later in April 2018, the Control Yuan had released a report on the incident, in which it placed the majority of the blame on the BOCA passport design group and group members' carelessness when researching images for the terminal. The report also highlighted the lack of communication between the BOCA and the CEPP, which failed to exercise due diligence on copyright issues and did not independently verify the correctness of the image due to the BOCA's status as a long-time customer. The report also strongly condemned the MOFA's initial dismissal of the incident.

On 4 May 2018, the BOCA announced that it had estimated that the initial stock of the 550,000 booklets with the sticker would be depleted by mid-May, and the new version without the sticker on page 5 would then be issued. The sticker-less version would continue to feature page 5, which now bears the correct terminal building, as a travel warnings page rather than an amendment/endorsement page.

=== References to "Taiwan" ===
The common English word "Taiwan" has been printed on the front of passports since 2003. This was added after an original proposal to add "Issued in Taiwan" was shelved after strong criticism from the mainland Chinese government the previous year.

On 22 July 2020, the Legislative Yuan passed two resolutions put forth by the ruling Democratic Progressive Party (DPP) that ask the executive branch of government to highlight "Taiwan" on passports and China Airlines' (CAL) aircraft. The resolutions require the Executive Yuan to work out measures to emphasize the word for "Taiwan" written in Chinese (臺灣) and in English on the passport cover. The New Power Party has submitted proposals for new passport designs for public vote. The Kuomintang (KMT; Nationalist Party of China) has accused the DPP of revisionism and criticized President Tsai Ing-wen's administration for missing an opportunity to advertise the nation to the world due to its focus on its own ideological and political considerations. The new passport design was officially announced in September 2020.

== Passport gallery ==
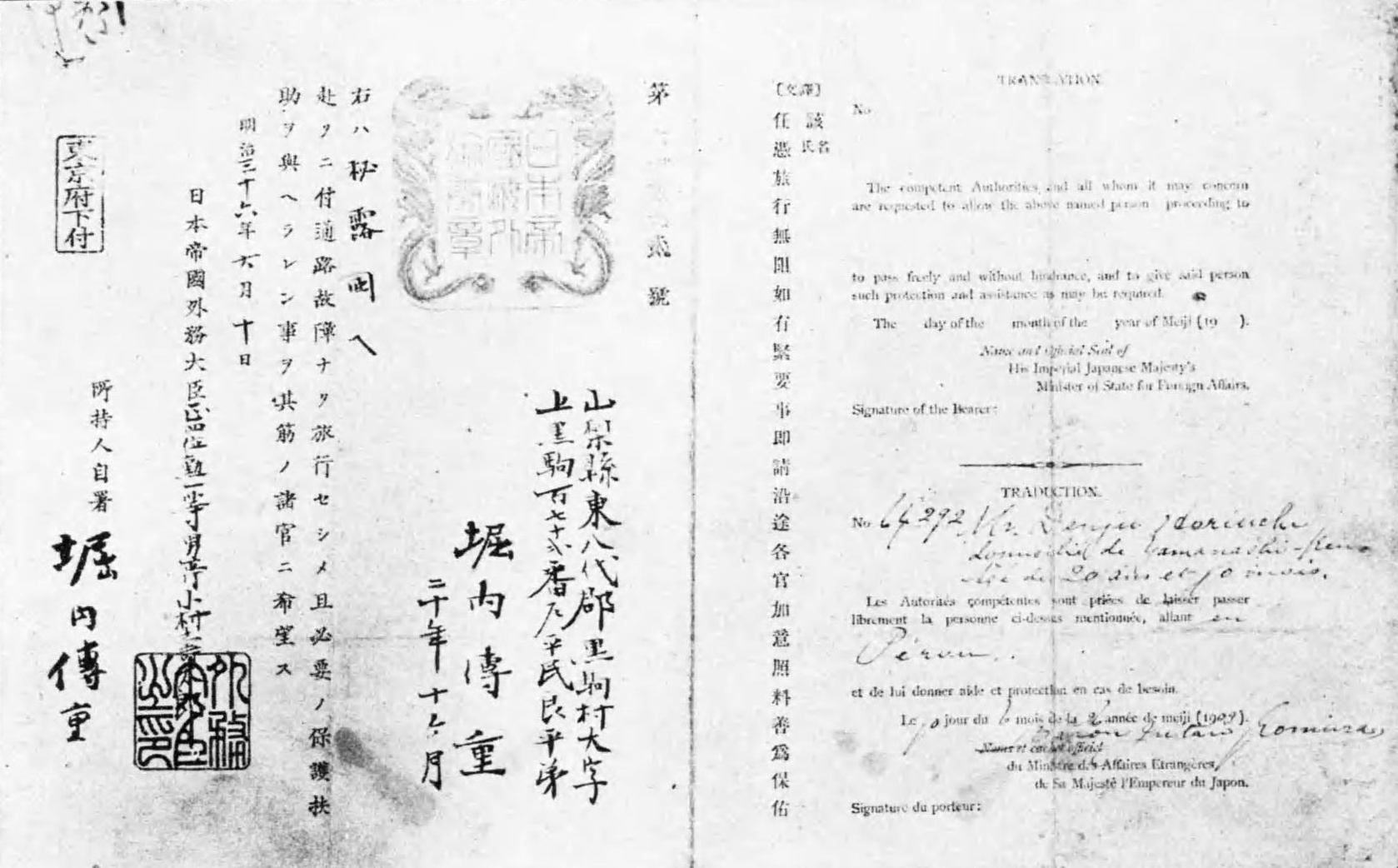
A Japanese passport issued to Denjū Horiuchi (ja) in 1903. This passport was also used in Taiwan.

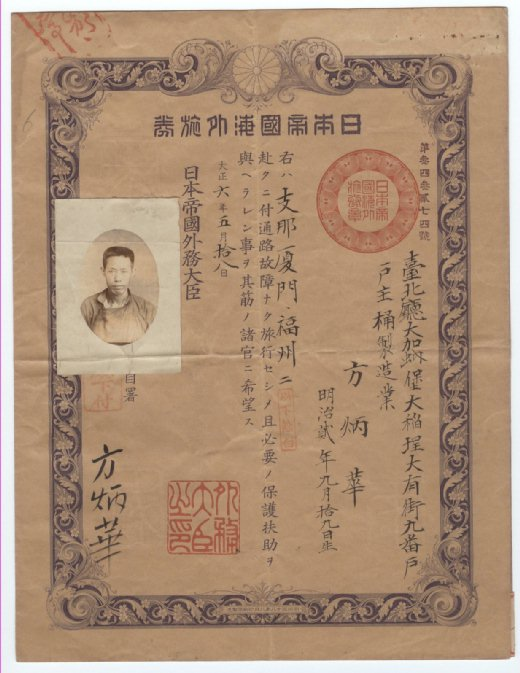
Imperial Japanese Overseas Passport issued in Taiwan in 1917.

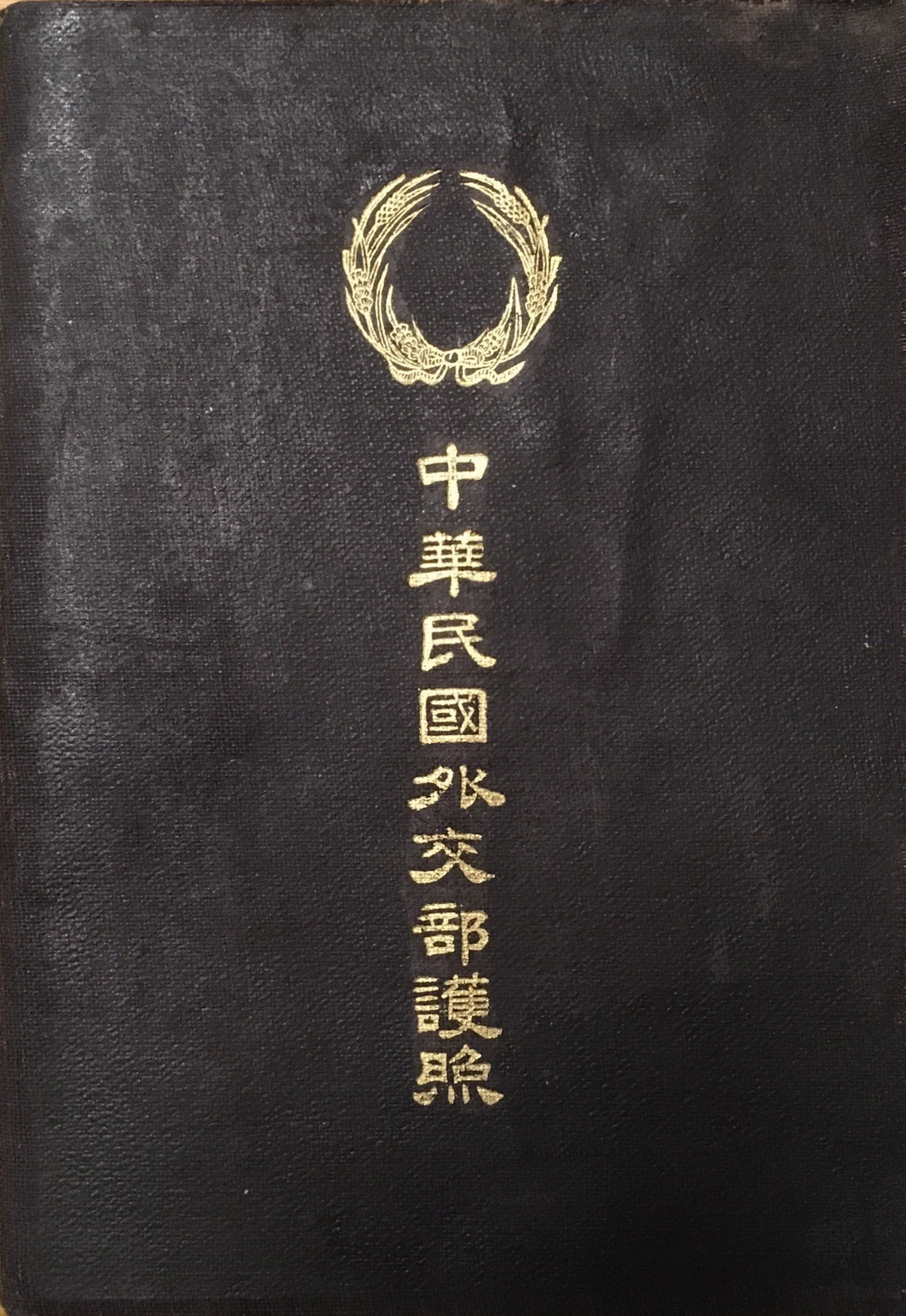
A Republic of China passport booklet issued during the Beiyang-era in the 1920s.

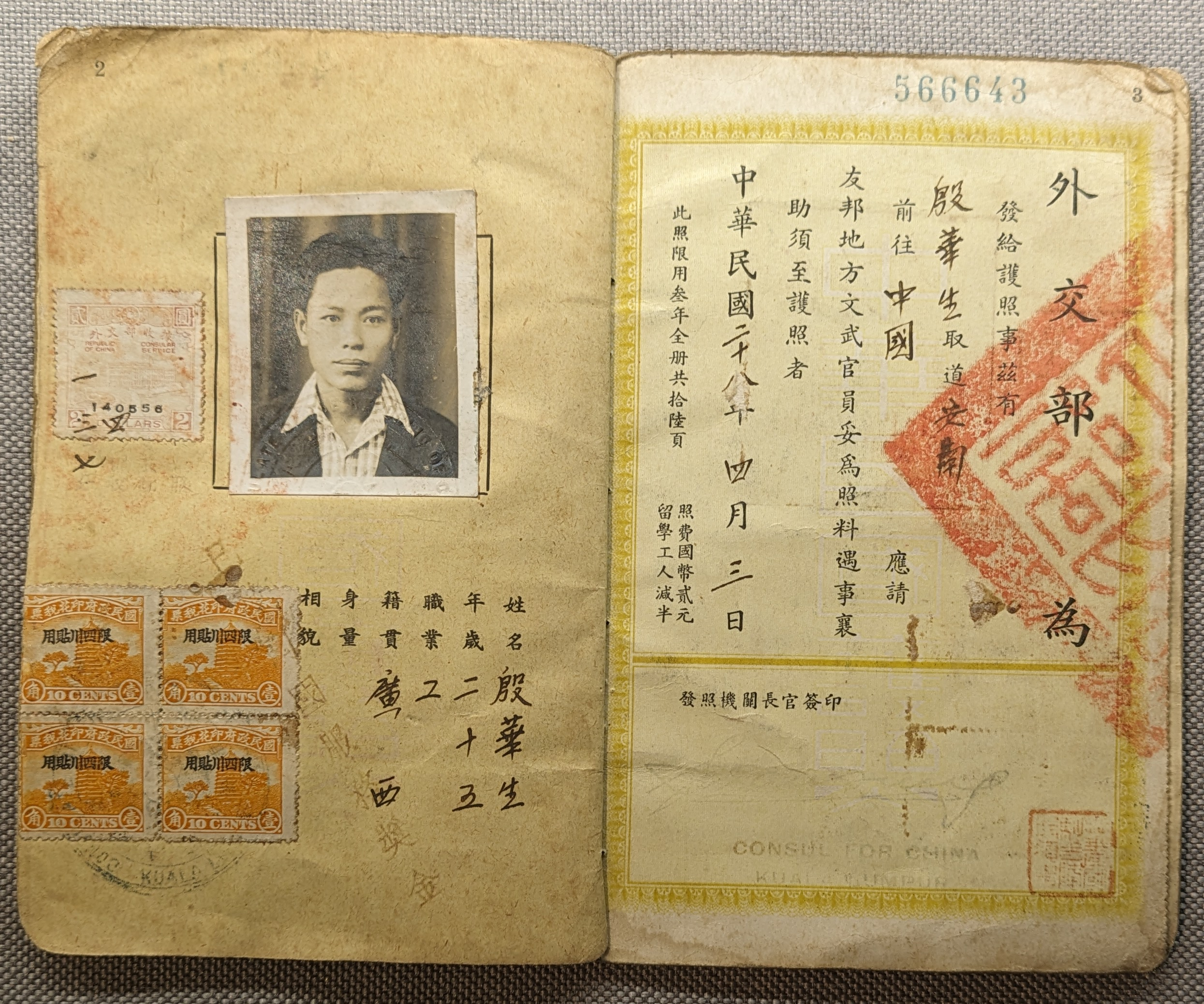
A Republic of China passport issued in 1939.

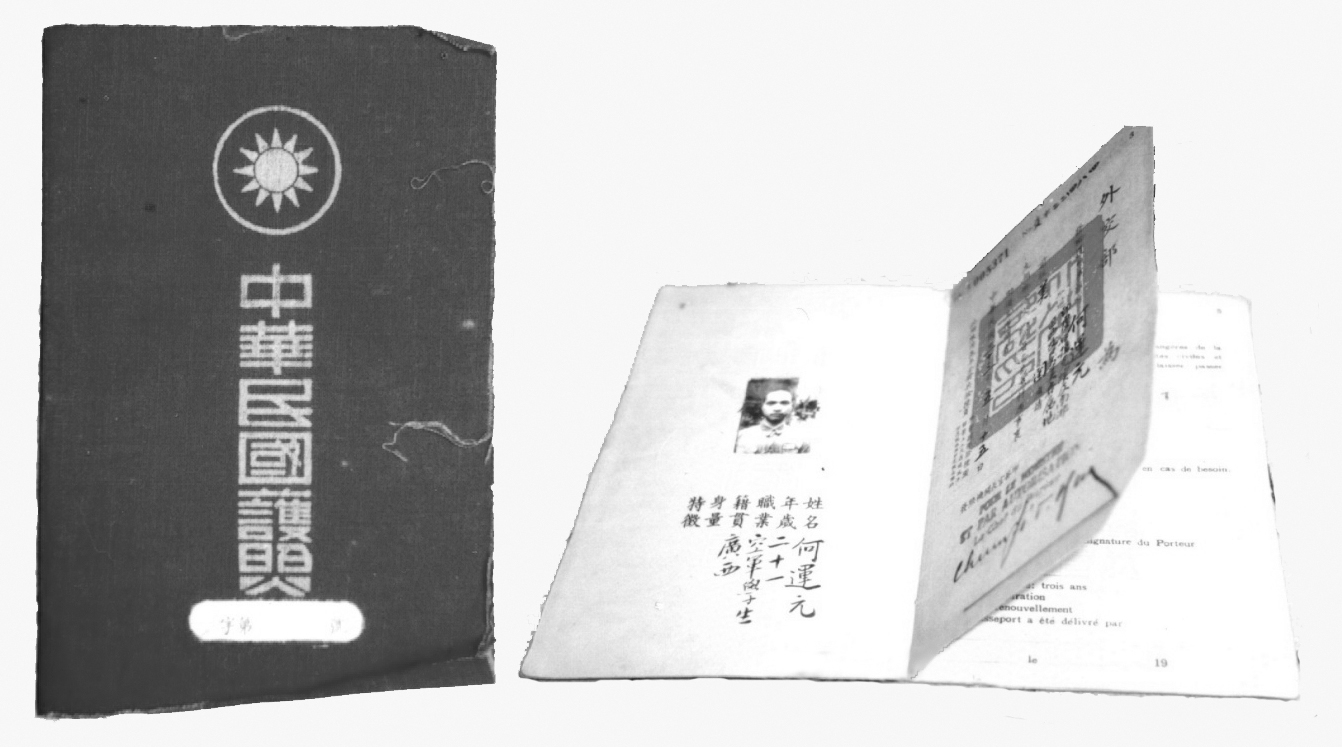
A Republic of China passport issued in 1946.

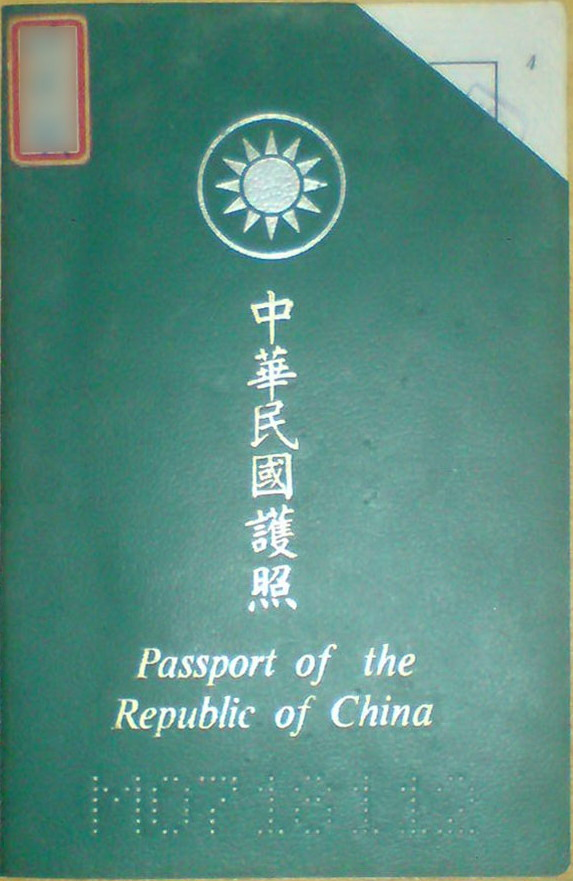
A Republic of China passport issued in 1982.

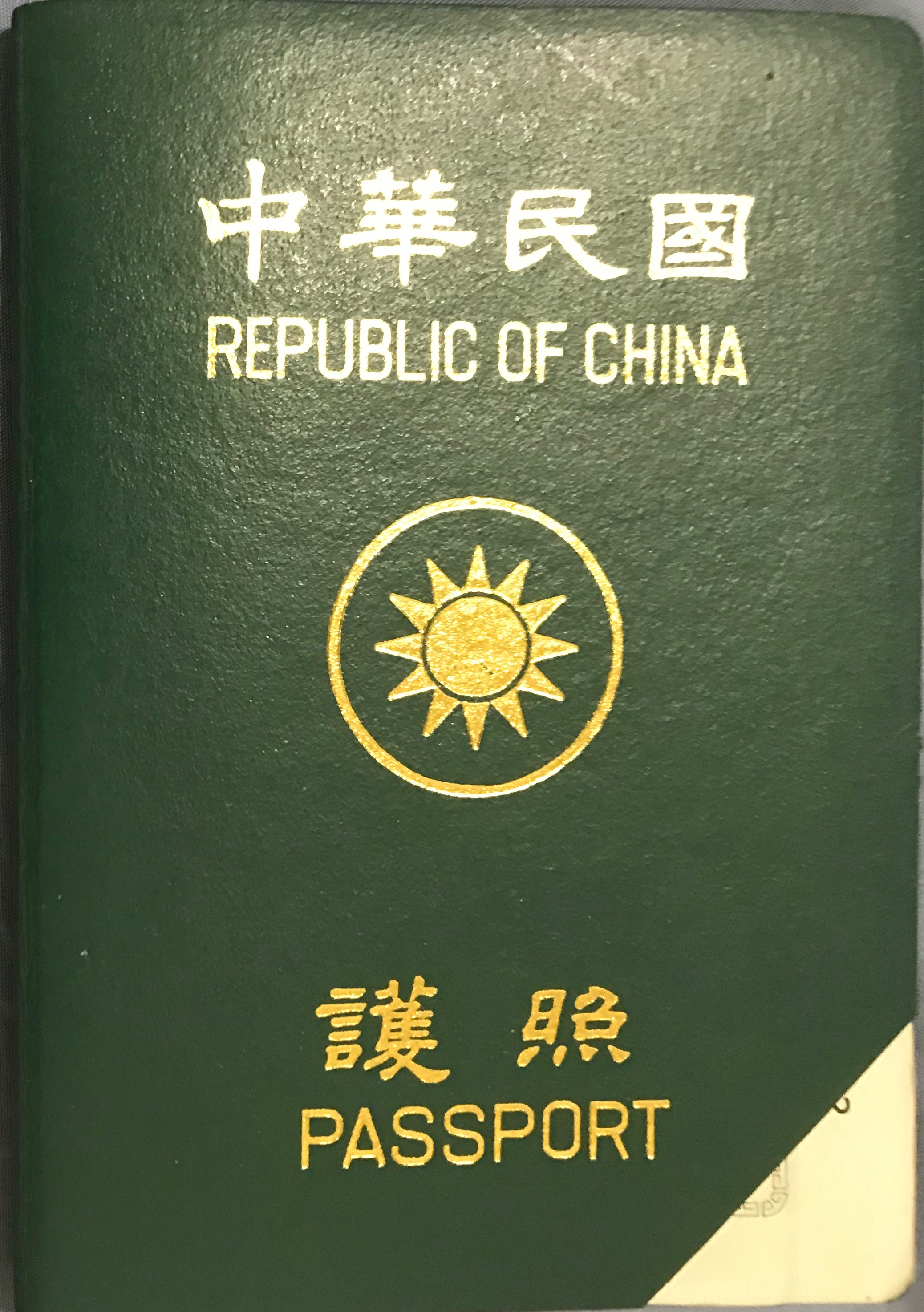
A machine-readable, non-biometric Republic of China passport issued in 2000.

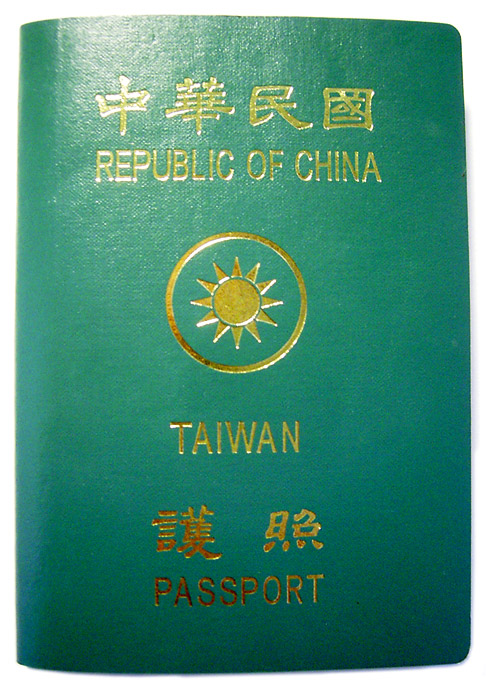
A machine-readable, non-biometric Republic of China passport issued in 2006.

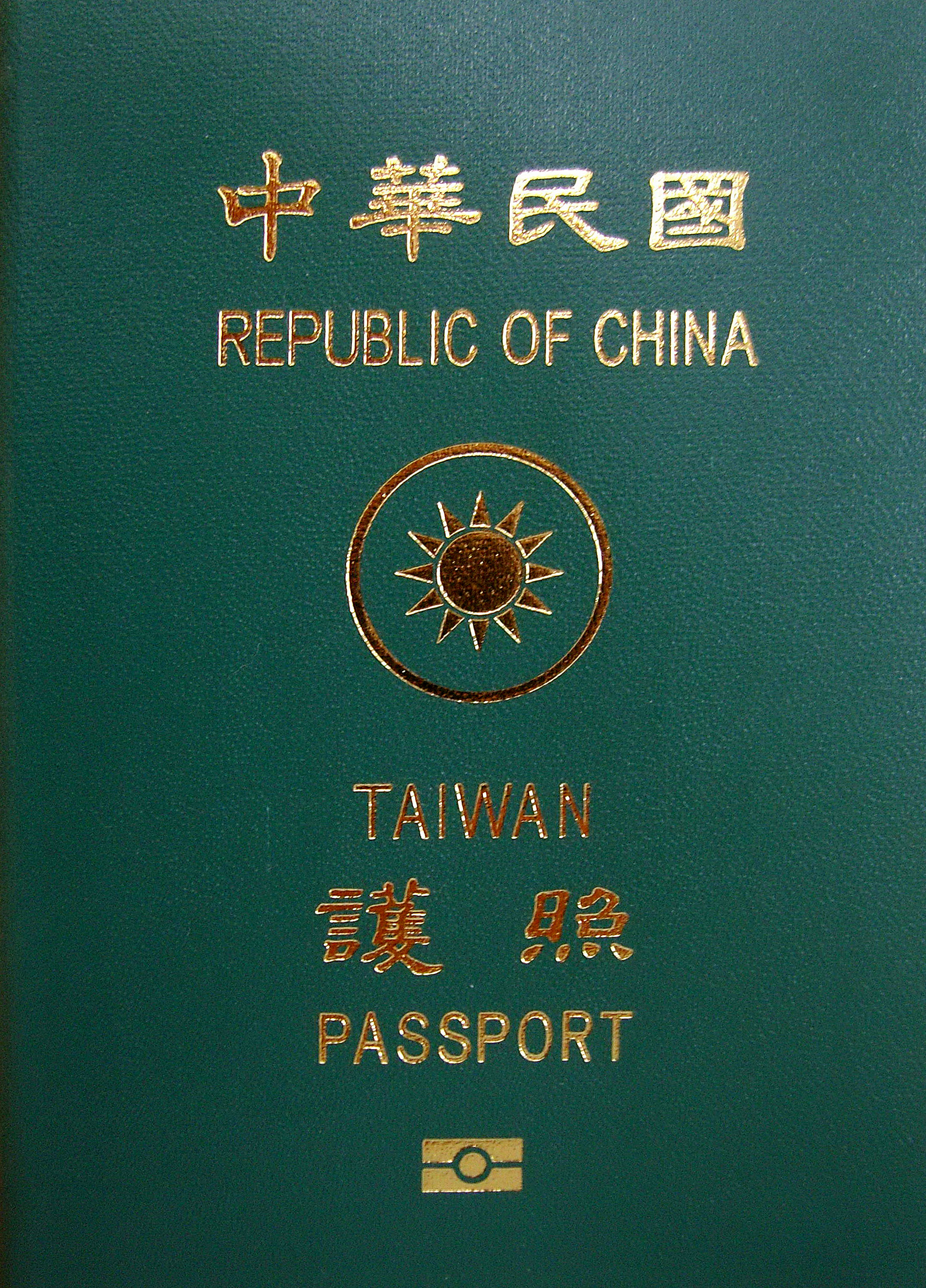
A biometric Republic of China passport issued on December 29, 2008.

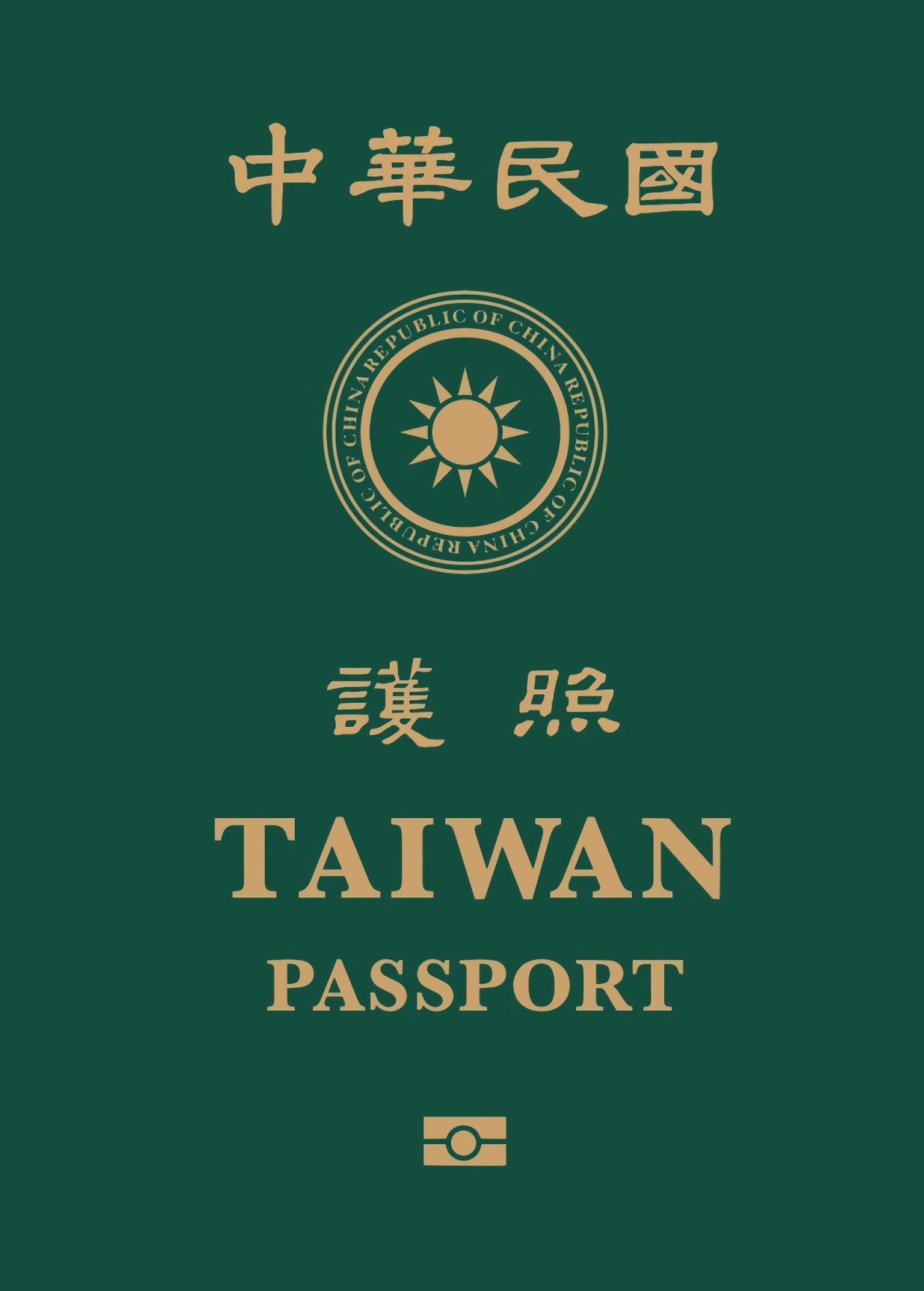
A new version of the biometric passport has been introduced since January 2021. This mock-up shows design elements with references to both names "Taiwan" and "Republic of China".

A new version of the biometric passport has been introduced since January 2021. Emblem of the Republic of China with encircling text as depicted on new passports.

== See also ==
- Visa requirements for Taiwanese citizens
- Foreign relations of Taiwan
