= Right of abode =

Legal right to permanent residence

The right of abode is an individual's freedom from immigration control in a particular country. A person who has the right of abode in a country does not need permission from the government to enter the country and can live and work there without restriction, and is immune from removal and deportation (unless the right of abode has been revoked).

Generally, to have right of abode, a person must be a citizen of that country. However, some countries grant the right of abode for qualified non-citizens. This is distinct with the commonly-called right to land, right to live or right of residence. Those with permanent residency generally have a de facto right of residence, which can be revoked in certain circumstances—such as conviction of crimes or prolonged absence. This is unlike citizenship, revocable only in very limited circumstances such as fraud or national security.

== Right of abode by region ==
=== EU, EEA, and the Schengen Agreement ===
Citizens of the European Economic Area (the European Union plus Iceland, Liechtenstein, and Norway) and Switzerland enjoy the freedom to travel to, live in, and work in any participating country without needing a work permit or visa, although transitory dispositions may restrict the rights of citizens of new member states to work in other countries. This is defined by the Directive 2004/38/EC on the right to move and reside freely.

However, rights to live in another EU/EEA state are not absolute. To reside in another EU/EEA state, one must either be working, job-hunting, a student, or otherwise have sufficient financial resources and health insurance to ensure they do not become a burden on the social services of the host country. States may also require nationals of other EU/EEA states to register their presence with the authorities after a certain period of time. EU/EEA states may deport nationals of other EU/EEA states and issue exclusion orders against them on grounds of public policy, public security, or public health. For example, those who commit serious crimes or come to rely on welfare may be deported. However, those subjected to such exclusion orders must be able to appeal them after a maximum period of three years, as per EU regulations. Under no circumstances can an EU/EEA state exclude a national of another EU/EEA state for life.

Any EU/EEA national who completes a five-year period of uninterrupted legal residence in another EU/EEA state becomes eligible for permanent residence, after which their presence is no longer subjected to any conditions, and they may apply for benefits that would previously have been grounds for removal, such as welfare. Permanent residency can only be revoked after a two-year absence.

==== Schengen Agreement ====
Nearly all EU/EEA countries are part of the Schengen Area; a group of countries that have signed the Schengen Agreement, which abolishes border controls between participating states, although it allows border controls to be temporarily set up in exceptional circumstances. The EEA countries and Switzerland have signed the Schengen treaty. New EU members usually become full members of Schengen after a transition period.

A few European countries require all persons to carry an identity card or passport, and proof of nationality is normally required to take up residence in any member state. Thus, while the Schengen Agreement facilitates the movement of persons across frontiers, it makes no substantive difference to residence rights.

=== Nordic Passport Union ===
The Nordic Passport Union gives the citizens of Nordic countries the right to freely travel to and reside in other Nordic countries without a passport or residence permit. The union includes the Faroe Islands and Greenland, which do not belong to the EU or the Schengen Area.

=== Gulf Cooperation Council ===
Citizens of member states of the Gulf Cooperation Council (GCC) have freedom of movement throughout the GCC, including the right to reside and work in other GCC states with almost no restrictions.

=== Japan ===
After Japan established diplomatic relations with South Korea, Japan granted a special permanent residency status to Koreans who lost their Japanese nationality after World War II but still live in Japan, as well as their descendants who were born in Japan. Compared to regular Japan permanent residency, special permanent residents have more privileges, such as: they are generally immune from being deported or being denied to enter; unless they renounce their special permanent resident status or revoked. During the 2020 pandemic, special permanent residents were allowed to return to Japan, while regular permanent residents were not.

=== Hong Kong ===
Right of abode in Hong Kong entitles a person to live and work in the territory without any restrictions or conditions of stay. Someone who has that right is a Hong Kong permanent resident. Foreign nationals (with infamous exception against domestic helpers) may acquire the right of abode after meeting a seven-year residency requirement and are given most rights usually associated with citizenship, including the right to vote in regional elections. However, they are not entitled to hold territorial passports or stand for office in some Legislative Council constituencies, unless they also naturalise as Chinese citizens.

As a special administrative region of China, Hong Kong does not have its own nationality law and natural-born residents are generally Chinese citizens. Prior to 1997, the territory was a colony of the United Kingdom and right of abode was tied to British nationality law. Although Hong Kong, mainland China, and Macau constitute a single country, local residents with Chinese citizenship do not have automatic residence rights in either of the other two jurisdictions, which both control immigration separately. Similarly, mainland Chinese and Macanese residents do not automatically have residence or employment rights in Hong Kong.

=== Macau ===
In Macau immigration law, the right of abode (Chinese: 居留權, ) entitles a person to live and work without any restrictions or conditions of stay. Individuals with this right are called permanent residents. Foreign nationals may acquire the right of abode after meeting a seven-year residency requirement and are given most rights usually associated with citizenship, including the right to vote in regional elections. However, they are not entitled to hold territorial passports unless they also naturalise as Chinese citizens.

As a special administrative region of China, the territory does not have its own nationality law and natural-born residents are generally Chinese citizens. Prior to 1999, the region was a colony of Portugal and right of abode was tied to Portuguese nationality law. Although Macau, mainland China, and Hong Kong constitute a single country, local residents with Chinese citizenship do not have automatic residence rights in either of the other two jurisdictions, which both control immigration separately. Conversely, mainland Chinese and Hong Kong residents do not automatically have residence or employment rights in Macau.

=== Taiwan ===
A national without household registration (NWOHR) is a person with Republic of China nationality who does not have household registration in Taiwan. Nationals with this status may be subject to immigration controls when entering the Taiwan Area, do not have automatic residence rights there, cannot vote in Taiwanese elections, and are exempt from conscription. As of 2011, about 60,000 NWOHRs held Taiwanese passports with this status. Most NWOHRs are overseas compatriots (individuals born to nationals overseas). According to statistics from the Overseas Community Affairs Council, there are as many as 39 million of these overseas compatriots. Foreigners who naturalize and gain Republic of China nationality are temporarily considered NWOHRs, for at least 1 year, until they can register household registration.

=== Common Travel Area ===
The Common Travel Area (CTA) consists of the United Kingdom, Republic of Ireland, and the UK's surrounding island territories. British and Irish citizens can move freely throughout the CTA without a passport and only minimal identity documents, and are subject to virtually no immigration controls. Citizens of both countries enjoy the right to live and work throughout the CTA with minimal restriction.

==== Deportation of British or Irish citizens ====
Unlike other EU/EEA nationals, Irish citizens who move to the UK are granted a "settled status", a status that goes beyond indefinite leave to remain. Irish nationals eligible for deportation are treated more leniently than other EU/EEA nationals, and are not automatically subjected to deportation procedures when convicted of crimes, as Parliament has considered "the close historical, community and political ties between the United Kingdom and Ireland, along with the existence of the Common Travel Area." Irish citizens are therefore legally subject to deportation from the UK only where recommended by a court in sentencing or in exceptional circumstances where that deportation is in the public interest.

Irish law provides even stronger protections for British citizens. British citizens are completely exempt from deportation from Ireland, and are almost never treated as foreigners by law.

==== Commonwealth citizens in the UK ====
In addition, some nationals of member states of the Commonwealth of Nations are considered Commonwealth citizens, and have various rights in other Commonwealth countries, including the UK, such as the right-of-abode and the right to vote. In addition, British subjects born before 1984 have the right-of-abode.

If a person has a British mother and was born before 1984 then under section 2(1)(b) of the Immigration Act 1971 they are considered to have the same rights as a British citizen. The right-of-abode is conferred automatically on such persons and they are issued a certificate on their passport.

Under exceptions in section 7 of the Immigration Act 1971, a long-term resident Irish or Commonwealth citizen in the UK is granted immunity from deportation, similar to British or other Commonwealth citizens who hold right-of-abode by virtue of a residency term of at least five years in the United Kingdom. These exceptions do not apply to other nationalities with leave to remain in the United Kingdom.

=== British Overseas Territories ===
All British Overseas Territories operate their own immigration controls which apply to British citizens as well as to those from other countries. These territories generally have local immigration laws regulating who has belonger status in that territory.

=== United Kingdom ===
The right of abode (ROA) is an immigration status in the United Kingdom that gives a person the unrestricted right to enter and live in the UK. It was introduced by the Immigration Act 1971 which went into effect on 1 January 1973. This status is held by British citizens, certain British subjects, as well as certain Commonwealth citizens with specific connections to the UK before 1983. Since 1983, it is not possible for a person to acquire this status without being a British citizen.

The right of abode is the most common immigration status in the UK due to its association with British citizenship. However, it should not be confused with the indefinite leave to remain (ILR), another form of long-term residency status in the UK which is more comparable to other countries' permanent residence status.

=== Pakistan ===
The Pakistan Origin Card (POC) is issued to eligible foreigners, particularly those of Pakistani origin, who do not possess Pakistani citizenship, and offers its holders various benefits, including right of abode in the country. POC holders are also granted the right to engage in property transactions, open and operate bank accounts, and secure employment in Pakistan. Furthermore, the POC serves as a substitute for a National Identity Card for its holders.

The POC is distinct from the National Identity Card for Overseas Pakistanis (NICOP), which is issued to Pakistani nationals residing abroad who hold dual citizenship.

== De facto right of abode ==
The nationality laws of many countries allow foreign citizens to reside permanently in the country without seeking citizenship. This status is usually accorded following application and selection based on a variety of criteria. In Australia, Canada, New Zealand and the United States among others, foreign residents who have the right to reside permanently in the country are given the legal definition of designation of "permanent resident". Although not conferring all the rights and privileges of citizenship, it allows such individuals to enter freely as well as to take advantage of social programs and other services offered to citizens. Nonetheless, this still remains a "de facto" form of right of abode because it can be revoked in accordance with the law.

=== Full permanent resident ===
This includes cases where there is access to citizenship:

- New Zealand grants Australian citizens/permanent residents full permanent resident rights in New Zealand.
- The United Kingdom and Ireland grant automatic permanent residency to each other's citizens.
- Full permanent residency rights exist between the countries of the Nordic Council (Norway, Sweden, Finland, Denmark and Iceland).

=== As long-term temporary residents ===
In these cases there is a right of residence but without access to full citizenship rights:

- New Zealand citizens in Australia, but since 2001, Australia grants only limited rights.
- Citizens of EEA member states and Switzerland living in each other's country (except the cases above).
- Most citizens of the Federated States of Micronesia (FSM), the Republic of the Marshall Islands (RMI) and the Republic of Palau may live and work in the United States, and most U.S. citizens and their spouses may live and work in those states under a Compact of Free Association with the United States.

== See also ==
- Belonger status
- Common Travel Area
- Free movement of workers
- Freedom of movement
- Nationality law
- Permanent residency
- Right of return
- Schengen Treaty
