= Taiwanese diaspora =

Descendants from Taiwan who live abroad

Overseas Taiwanese
Total population
- 1,944,178 Map of the Taiwanese Diaspora

Regions with significant populations
- United States: 1,002,000
- Indonesia: 632,000
- China: 404,000
- Malaysia: 34,900
- Japan: 303,000
- Thailand: 290,200
- Australia: 190,020
- Canada: 173,000
- Vietnam: 99,350
- Philippines: 99,000
- United Kingdom: 96,000
- Brazil: 90,000
- France: 89,500
- New Zealand: 89,000
- Singapore: 81,000
- South Africa: 75,000
- Costa Rica: 69,000
- Argentina: 68,000
- Brunei: 63,000
- Germany: 45,000
- South Korea: 31,000
- Others: 78,000

Languages
- Mandarin, Hokkien, Hakka, Formosan languages

Related ethnic groups
- Taiwanese

Overseas Taiwanese (Chinese: 海外臺灣人), also called "people of Taiwanese descent" (Chinese: 臺裔; pinyin: Táiyì), are people of Taiwanese birth or ancestry who live or were born outside of Taiwan. Overseas Taiwanese may or may not be Taiwanese citizens. Taiwanese citizens must return to the country to legally vote in elections, as there are no absentee ballots.

== In North America ==
There are 230,382 to 919,000 people of Taiwanese descent in the United States. They are concentrated in the states of California, New York, and Texas. There are over 91,000 Taiwanese people in Canada, mainly living in the provinces of British Columbia and Ontario.

== See also ==
- Taishang, Taiwanese businessmen in mainland China
- Taiwanese people
- Han Taiwanese, descendants of Han Chinese people
- Austronesian people, descendants of Taiwanese aborigines in the Pacific and Southeast Asia
