= Taiwanese nationality law =

Conditions in which a person is a national of the Republic of China

Nationality Act 國籍法 Guójí Fǎ (Mandarin) Kok-che̍k Hoat (Taiwanese) Koet-sit Fap (Hakka)

Legislative Yuan
- Territorial extent: Free area of the Republic of China (includes Taiwan, Penghu, Kinmen, Matsu, and outlying islands)
- Enacted: 5 February 1929
- Effective: 5 February 1929
- Administered by: Ministry of the Interior

Amended by
- 9 February 2000 (amending the whole law); 21 December 2016 (last amended)
- Status: Amended

Taiwanese nationality law details the conditions in which a person is a national of the Republic of China, commonly known as Taiwan. The Nationality Act is based on the principle of jus sanguinis, children born to at least one Taiwanese parent are automatically nationals at birth. Foreign nationals with residency in Taiwan may naturalize after continuously living in the country for at least five years. Certain foreign immediate family members of Taiwanese nationals may naturalize after continuously living in the country for at least three years.

The current law of Taiwan has a clear distinction between those with and without household registration. Taiwanese law does not distinguish between nationals and citizens. Constitutional civil and political rights as well as citizens’ responsibilities are only granted to those nationals who establish their household registration in Taiwan.

From the history of the Republic of China, the country had once controlled the territories of today's People's Republic of China (PRC) and Mongolia. There is ongoing political debate of whether the nationality law is still applicable to persons residing in those territories. While the executive branch of the government published explanations in May 2023 determining that Mainland Chinese residents are no longer to be considered ROC nationals, legal scholars argue that the matter is not resolved as executive branch explanations are not legally binding and that unless amended by the Legislative Yuan, both the Nationality Act and the Cross-Strait Act still include citizens of Mainland China (i.e., the PRC) as ROC nationals.

== History ==
Following the First Sino-Japanese War in 1895, the islands of Taiwan and Penghu were ceded by the Qing Empire, the last imperial dynasty of China, to the Empire of Japan according to the Treaty of Shimonoseki. The Treaty also ruled that residents who chose to remain in ceded territory were granted Japanese nationality in 1897. In 1899, the Imperial Diet of Japan passed the Nationality Law. This is the first nationality law that has applied to Taiwanese people.

After the Second World War in 1945, the Allies ordered the control of these islands be transferred to the Republic of China (ROC, which succeeded the Qing Empire in 1912) by General Order No. 1. The ROC government then declared the "restoration" of Chinese nationality on local residents in 1946 and implemented its Nationality Act, which promulgated in 1929. Unlike the cession to Japan, Taiwanese residents could not choose which nationality to retain when the ROC took control, which gave rise to diplomatic protests from the United Kingdom and the United States. Japanese nationality was revoked from all residents in 1952 under the terms of the Treaty of Taipei. Near the end of the Chinese Civil War, the government of the Republic of China was forced to retreat to Taiwan by the Communist Party, which subsequently established the People's Republic of China (PRC) in 1949. Since the conclusion of the war, the ROC has controlled only the Taiwan Area.

At the Cold War era, the government of the Republic of China on Taiwan continued to constitutionally claim territories control by the People's Republic of China (PRC) and Mongolian People's Republic (MPR) as part of its territory. Because of this, the Nationality Act treated residents of those territories as nationals. Additionally, because Taiwanese nationality law operates under the principle of jus sanguinis, most overseas Chinese, Mongolian, and Taiwanese were also regarded as nationals. During the Cold War, both the ROC and PRC governments actively sought the support of overseas Chinese communities in their attempts to secure the position as the legitimate sole government of China. The ROC also encouraged overseas Chinese businessmen to settle in Taiwan to facilitate economic development. Regulations concerning evidence of ROC nationality by descent were particularly lax during this period, allowing many overseas Chinese the right to settle in Taiwan.

From the late 1980s, Taiwanese people developed a stronger sense of Taiwanese national identity and more readily asserted its separate identity from that of China. Legal reforms in the 1990s and 2000s greatly reduced the ease by which further grants of nationality were made to overseas Chinese and Mongolian, and restricted citizenship rights only to those with household registration in Taiwan.

Residents of Mongolia, which was part of Imperial China until 1911, were also regarded as if they were mainland Chinese residents until 2002, when the Mainland Affairs Council removed the country from the administrative definition of the Mainland Area. Since then, Mongolians have been treated as foreigners and are required to apply for visas before entering Taiwan. In May 2013, the Mainland Affairs Council reaffirmed that Outer Mongolia is not a part of ROC's territorial claims and Mongolia is a sovereign state.

Residents of mainland China, which is now under the jurisdiction of the People's Republic of China (PRC), were identified as nationals given the pre-1949 history of the Republic of China. In May 2023, Executive Yuan released a policy memorandum to clarify that: "The people of mainland China do not have ROC nationality, and hence are not ROC nationals." (中國大陸人民不具中華民國國籍、非屬中華民國國民) Legal scholars, on the other hand, argue that the matter is not resolved as executive branch explanations are not legally binding to courts. Hence, unless amended by the Legislative Yuan, both the Nationality Act and the Cross-Strait Act still include citizens of Mainland China (i.e., the PRC) as ROC nationals.

== Acquisition and loss of nationality ==
=== Acquisition of nationality by birth ===
Children born to at least one parent with nationality are automatically nationals at birth regardless of their place of birth. However, those children may be with or without household registration depending on indicated circumstances. Recently, people who acquired nationality by birth are mainly Taiwanese people living in Taiwan or overseas. For historical reasons, many ethnic Chinese and Mongolian living overseas may also acquire nationality by providing valid documents issued by the government of the Republic of China that verify their parent's ROC nationality.

Children born within the Taiwan Area to stateless parents are also granted nationality at birth.

=== Acquisition of nationality by naturalization ===
Foreigners over the age of 20 may naturalize as ROC nationals after residing in Taiwan for more than five years and demonstrating proficiency in Mandarin Chinese. The residency requirement is reduced to three years if an applicant has a Taiwanese spouse or parent. Candidates for naturalization are typically required to renounce their previous nationalities unless they are workers in a reserved occupational field. Unmarried minor children cannot naturalize as ROC nationals independently, but a naturalized parent may apply for them on their behalf.

=== Loss of nationality ===
ROC nationality can be relinquished by application to the Ministry of the Interior, provided that they have acquired another nationality or are married to foreign nationals. The status may be deprived if it was fraudulently acquired. All Taiwanese nationals who obtain Hukou in the People's Republic of China automatically have their passports cancelled and any residence rights in Taiwan revoked.

=== Household registration ===
In practice, exercise of most citizenship benefits, such as suffrage, and labor rights, requires possession of the National Identification Card, which is only issued to people with household registration in the Taiwan Area aged 14 and older.

Note that children of nationals who were born abroad are eligible for Taiwan passports and therefore considered to be nationals, but often they do not hold a household registration so are referred to as "unregistered nationals" in statute. These ROC nationals have no automatic right to stay in Taiwan, nor do they have working rights, voting rights, etc. In a similar fashion, some British passport holders do not have the right of abode in the UK (see British nationality law). Unregistered nationals can obtain a National Identification Card only by settling in Taiwan for 1-5 years depending on amount stayed in Taiwan during that time. Beginning on 1 January 2024, however, unregistered nationals born in Taiwan to Taiwanese parents with household registration, or born overseas with at least one parent with household registration, can gain household registration immediately without any further requirements.

If a spouse of an ROC national is a resident of PRC, they can obtain household registration in Taiwan without acquiring ROC nationality first. Spouses who are nationals of other countries need to become naturalized first before becoming eligible for household registration in Taiwan.

== Travel freedom ==
Visa requirements for Taiwanese citizens

Visa requirements for Taiwanese citizens are administrative entry restrictions by the authorities of other states placed on citizens of Taiwan. In 2014, Taiwanese citizens have visa-free or visa on arrival access to 167 countries and territories, ranking the Taiwan passport 26th in the world according to the Visa Restrictions Index.

Taiwan passport issued to overseas nationals is different than the type of passport issued to Taiwanese citizens with the former having far more restrictions than the latter. For instance, overseas nationals passport holders are required to apply for a visa to enter the Schengen area, whereas no visa is required for the regular passport holders. See the passport article for more information about this practice.

According to the standards and regulations of most international organizations, "Republic of China" is not a recognized nationality. In the international standard ISO 3166-1, the proper nationality designation for people domiciled in Taiwan is not ROC, but rather TWN. This three-letter code TWN is also the official designation adopted by the International Civil Aviation Organization for use on a machine-readable travel document when dealing with entry/exit procedures at immigration authorities outside Taiwan.

== Issues ==
=== Nationals of the People's Republic of China ===
The government of the Republic of China does not recognize the People's Republic of China (PRC) and claims its official borders encompass all territories governed by the PRC. Thus, if the residents of the People's Republic of China (including Hong Kong and Macau) want to travel to Taiwan, they must do so using the Exit & Entry Permit Taiwan. Chinese passports, Hong Kong SAR passports, Macau SAR passports, and BN(O) passports are generally not stamped by Taiwan immigration officers.

However, by Article 9-1, "[t]he people of the Taiwan Area may not have household registrations in the mainland China or hold passports issued by the Mainland China." If they obtain the passport or household registration of the People's Republic of China (PRC), they will be deprived of their ROC Passport and household registration in Taiwan. It does not apply to Hong Kong and Macau in the sense that, if the residents of Hong Kong and Macau have settled permanently in Taiwan and gain citizenship rights as below, they are allowed to keep the passports as travel documents.

If the residents of the People's Republic of China (including Hong Kong and Macau) seek to settle permanently in Taiwan and gain citizenship rights, they do not naturalize like citizens of foreign countries. Instead, they merely can establish household registration, which in practice takes longer and is more complicated than naturalization. Article 9 does not apply to overseas Chinese holding foreign nationality who seek to exercise ROC nationality. Such people do not need to naturalize because they are already legally ROC nationals. Residents of the People's Republic of China (including Hong Kong and Macau), only after gaining permanent resident status abroad, or otherwise establishing a period of residency defined by the regulations, become eligible for a Taiwan passport but do not gain benefits of citizenship.

=== Nationals of Mongolia ===
Before 2002, Mongolia was also claimed to be part of the country. Since then, the ROC government has affirmed its recognition that Mongolia is a sovereign state and permitted citizens of Mongolia to use their passports to enter Taiwan.

=== Overseas nationals ===
Nationals of the Republic of China with household registrations in the Taiwan Area are eligible for the Taiwan passport, and will lose the household registrations in the Taiwan Area, along with their ROC passport, upon holding the PRC passport. They are different and mutually exclusive in law; most people living in Taiwan only will and only can choose one of these two to identify themselves by current laws.

Taiwan passports are also issued to many overseas Taiwanese and overseas Chinese as a proof of nationality, irrespective of whether they have lived or even set foot in Taiwan. The rationale behind this extension of the principle of jus sanguinis to existing nationals, as well as the recognition of dual citizenships, is to acknowledge the support given by overseas Chinese historically to the Kuomintang regime, particularly during the Xinhai Revolution. The type of passport issued to these individuals is called "Overseas National Passport" (僑民護照).
