= 2023 Taiwanese anti–Indian migrant worker protest =

Protest in Taiwan

2023 Taiwanese anti-Indian migrant worker protest
- Date: December 3, 2023
- Location: Ketagalan Boulevard, Taipei, Taiwan
- Caused by: Opposition to a memorandum of understanding for importing Indian workers
- Goals: Stop importing migrant workers
- Methods: Political demonstration, Internet activism
- Result: The Government continued to import migrant workers, but agreed to plan complementary measures

On 3 December 2023, 100 individuals took part in a protest named 守護民主台灣大遊行 123別印來 (lit. 'A Great Protest of Protecting Taiwan: 123 Don't Come In') in Taiwan, which called for a halt to the importation of Indian migrant workers. The protest took place during the discussion of a memorandum of understanding between Taiwan and India, which would allow Taiwan to import Indian migrant workers to address the labour shortage in Taiwan caused by its ageing population. The MOU would allow Taiwan to hire up to 100,000 Indian workers. The news coverage of the MOU provoked backlash on the Internet, which led to the protest. It was the first protest in Taiwan specifically against migrant worker imports.

Initially, the Taiwanese government characterised the protest as the result of cognitive warfare, but later promised to strengthen communication and proceed with the policy incrementally. Media outlets and experts have expressed concern about the discriminatory nature of the stereotypes driving the protest. Other commentators have suggested that disinformation campaigns linked to the People's Republic of China contributed to the protest.

== Background ==
Memorandum of understanding between The Taipei Economic and Cultural Center in New Delhi, India and The India Taipei Association on the facilitation of employment of Indian workers

Due to a labour shortage, Taiwan began importing migrant workers from the 1980s. In 1992, the "Employment Service Act" (就業服務法) and its corresponding regulations were enacted to provide a legal framework for employing migrant workers. Following this, Taiwanese employers started hiring migrant workers as part of their regular workforce. Migrant workers often work in Taiwan as caregivers, construction workers, factory workers, farmworkers, lumberjacks, and fishers. The main source countries for migrant workers in Taiwan are Indonesia, the Philippines, Thailand, and Vietnam. Before 2023, the latest source country that Taiwan opened to migrant workers was Mongolia in 2004.

With a fertility rate below replacement level, Taiwan's labour force has been declining recently. This, combined with ageing population, has caused the demand for migrant workers to continue to rise. Labour shortage has become a significant issue for Taiwanese industries. Taiwan remains heavily reliant on Indonesia, the Philippines, Thailand, and Vietnam, to source migrant workers from. In contrast, other developed Asian countries have a more diverse range of source countries. For example, Japan and South Korea source migrant workers from more than 10 countries, and both have reformed their immigration policies to attract foreign labour. Taiwan has previously attempted to develop migrant worker sourcing agreements with Bangladesh, Cambodia, and Myanmar. However, these efforts failed due to geopolitical reasons. Meanwhile, India, the most populous country in the world, faced the challenge of high unemployment due to the size of its labour force. India and Taiwan, therefore, sought to resolve their respective issues through a mutual agreement.

On 12 September 2023, Chen Chien-jen, then Premier of the Republic of China, met with Manharsinh Laxmanbhai Yadav, then director general of the India-Taipei Association. They agreed to sign two memoranda of understanding on migration, mobility and traditional medicine. Arindam Bagchi, then Official Spokesperson of the Ministry of External Affairs, said the MOU would benefit both sides. The agreement was expected to be finalised by the end of 2023, according to Chen. In November 2023, negotiations of a mutual pact were almost complete, which would allow Taiwan to hire up to 100,000 Indian workers, according to a senior official quoted by Bloomberg News. The report also noted that the agreement would potentially anger China, which has long-standing geopolitical tensions with both Taiwan and India.

== Protest ==
After the Bloomberg news report, a rumour that Taiwan would hire 100,000 Indian workers spread on Taiwanese social networks Dcard and PTT. Reasons for opposition to the pact include concern that Indian migrant workers may affect local security due to perceptions that sexual assault and murder are highly prevalent in India. Another concern was a potential decline in working conditions. Other users criticised the government for its hasty decision-making and lack of complementary measures to the policy.

Media coverage noted racist stereotypes that connect Indians with sex crimes, as some users on social media labelled them as "potential rapists" and suggested that "Taiwan will become a land of rape".

On 3 December 2023, a citizen activist group called "反對增加新移工國" (lit. 'Oppose Adding New Migrant Worker Countries') held a protest named "守護民主台灣大遊行 123別印來" (lit. 'A Great Protest of Protecting Taiwan: 123 Don't Come In') in Ketagalan Boulevard, Taipei, with four demands to the government, including "stop adding new migrant worker countries", "provide an effective platform for people to speak out", "impose special laws on managing migrant workers", and "improve labour conditions". The protest, which included approximately one hundred participants, was organised by social media user Yuna. Yuna emphasised that doubts about Indian workers and the protest's demands were gathered from Dcard and Line. It was the first protest in Taiwan against the importation of migrant workers.

On 10 December, Taiwan International Workers Association held a protest called "政府承擔、仲介滾蛋" (lit. 'government kick in, agents kick out'), calling on the government to lead the hiring process and abolish private agents involved in hiring migrant workers.

== Government response ==
Hsu Ming-chun, then Minister of Labor, responded to the protest by stating that the claim "Taiwan will hire 100,000 Indians" was misinformation. The Ministry of Foreign Affairs also alleged that racist feeds on social media are a part of Chinese Internet manipulation, citing similar activity from other fake accounts. During the protests, traces of "modular message manipulation" (Chinese: 模組化留言的操作) appeared, according to national security departments in Taiwan. The official Twitter account of the Ministry of Foreign Affairs later stated that any attempts to destroy goodwill in the Milk Tea Alliance would not prevail. However, protesters, rejected these assertions. Yuna denied allegations of discrimination or manipulation during the protest.

In December 2023, in response to the protest, the Ministry of Labor stated that it would plan complementary measures to the policy. (Note: According to the department, complementary measures include industries that can use Indian migrant workers, quotas, migrant worker criteria, bilateral legal regulation, and importing procedures.") Any introduction of new migrant workers would be a gradual process. On 16 February 2024, Taiwan and India signed the memorandum of understanding, agreeing that Taiwan would import migrant workers after preparations had completed. In November 2024, Taiwan agreed to import 1,000 Indian migrant workers to factories in Taiwan, in a test of the policy, and stated it would adjust importing policy according to the results of the test.

In April 2026, Hung Sun-han, then Minister of Labor, announced that the first group of imported Indian workers could arrive this year. The announcement faced backlash in two days, with a petition against importing Indian workers exceeding 40,000 signatures. Both the KMT and the TPP opposed importing Indian workers as well. The Ministry of Labor reversed the decision and responded that the government would not import workers hastily.

== Reaction ==
They are independent and not manipulated by others in certain kinds, and determined to prove it by resisting the labels put by authority. Their understanding of the policy, however, is often one-sided: They built a fuzzy perception from "flashing" feeds on social media, and linked it with existing stereotype labels. It is very easy to breed xenophobic activities, or even hate speech, in the emotion of fear without awareness. (Note: 某種程度他們很有獨立精神，想透過反抗權威貼上的標籤，證明自己並非腦袋空空、任人操控。然而他們對議題的理解往往相對片面，透過社群媒體上「閃現」的動態消息成為一個模模糊糊的印象，再將這樣的印象與（刻板）標籤進行連結。因此，容易在恐懼的情緒孳生成排外的行動，或發表赤裸裸的歧視言論而不自覺。)

— Comment from the reporter reporting the protest on the Initium Media

According to media coverage, many Indians found the protest offensive and discriminatory. Priya Lee Lalwani, an Indian resident of Taiwan since 1987, expressed disappointment with the demonstration, stating that it stemmed from a misunderstanding between Taiwanese and Indian communities. The Taiwan Association for India Studies (臺灣印度研究協會) issued a statement expressing regret over instances of hate speech and the limited understanding of Indian society and culture within Taiwan. Yuna, the organiser of the protest, revised the protest demands after being made aware of the response of Indians to the protest.

On the other hand, Sun Chi-pen (孫治本), then executive of the Taiwan-India Association (台灣印度協會), observed that many protesters were concerned about labour conditions in Taiwan and distrusted the government. Sun also suggested that the government should strengthen communication and formulate complementary measures to the policy.

Sriparna Pathak, Associate Professor of China Studies at O.P. Jindal Global University, described racist feeds on social media as "malicious propaganda" in her NDTV column, and criticised this content for ignoring sexual crimes in Taiwan. She also suggested that stereotypes against Indians may be spread as a part of Chinese misinformation campaigns, citing China Times' media coverage as evidence. Fact checks by Taiwan FactCheck Center and Taiwan Information Environment Research Center were also underway at the time. According to NHK, some protesters became aware because of posts which quickly spread on Dcard and Twitter; these posts, which often used the mainland China dialect instead of the Taiwanese dialect, were referenced in the context of cognitive warfare.

Pei-chia Lan, Professor of Sociology at National Taiwan University and a researcher of migrant labour in Taiwan, mentioned the tendency of Taiwanese individuals to sexualise foreigners and the legacy of the 2023 Taiwanese MeToo movement in increasing the participation of women in the protest. Yoyo Yu, a former journalist stationed in India, said the environment that can develop rape in India cannot be reproduced in countries where migrant workers reside. Both Karen Hsu (徐瑞希), founder of the Global Worker's Organization (台灣外籍工作者發展協會), and Yoyo Yu, emphasise the impact of mass media in Taiwan in constructing stereotypes of Indians and promoting hate speech.

Critics have accused the government of making misleading statements regarding its policy on importing migrant workers. Hou Yu-ih and Ko Wen-je, candidates of the 2024 Taiwanese presidential election at the time, highlighted the government’s failure to address the core issue: the actual number of migrant workers to be imported. Hou also criticised the inconsistent stance on signing the memorandum of understanding. An editorial of The Storm Media described the government's response as "bankruptcy of trustworthiness" following the signing of the memorandum of understanding.

== See also ==
- I-Soon leak
- India–Taiwan relations
- 2024 United Kingdom riots
- Irish anti-immigration protests
