= List of border control organisations =

Border control is generally the responsibility of specialised government organisations which oversee various aspects their jurisdiction's border control policies, including customs, immigration policy, border security, biosecurity measures. Official designations, division of responsibilities, and command structures of these organisations vary considerably and some countries split border control functions across multiple agencies.

== Canada ==
- Immigration, Refugees and Citizenship Canada: Immigration, Refugees and Citizenship Canada (IRCC; French: Immigration, Réfugiés et Citoyenneté Canada) is the department of the Government of Canada with responsibility for matters dealing with immigration to Canada, refugees, and Canadian citizenship. IRCC's mandate emanates from the Department of Citizenship and Immigration Act. The Minister of IRCC is the key person to uphold and administer the Citizenship Act of 197 and its subsequent amendments. The minister will work closely with the Minister of Public Safety in relation to the administration of the Immigration and Refugee Protection Act.
- Canada Border Services Agency: The Canada Border Services Agency (CBSA; French: Agence des services frontaliers du Canada) is the primary organisation tasked with maintaining Canada's border controls. The Agency was created on 12 December 2003, though its creation was formalised by the Canada Border Services Agency Act, which received Royal Assent on 3 November 2005. amalgamating Canada Customs (from the now-defunct Canada Customs and Revenue Agency) with border and enforcement personnel from the Department of the CIC and the Canadian Food Inspection Agency (CFIA).
- Canadian Air Transport Security Authority: The Canadian Air Transport Security Authority (CATSA; (French: Administration canadienne de la sûreté du transport aérien) is the Canadian Crown corporation responsible for security screening of people and baggage and the administration of identity cards at the 89 designated airports in Canada. CATSA is answerable to Transport Canada and reports to the Government of Canada through the Minister of Transport.

== China ==
Border control in China is the responsibility of a variety of entities in each of the country's four distinct immigration areas. In the Special Administrative Regions of Hong Kong and Macau, agencies tracing their lineage to British and Portuguese colonial authorities, respectively, perform border control functions based on the policies and practices in force before those territories' return to the People's Republic of China. Areas administered by the Republic of China are subject to border controls distinct from those in the People's Republic of China.

- People's Republic of China:
  - Hong Kong: The Immigration Department (Chinese: 入境事務處) of Hong Kong is responsible for border controls of the Hong Kong Special Administrative Regions, including internal controls with the rest of China. After the People's Republic of China resumed sovereignty of the territory in July 1997, Hong Kong's immigration system remained largely unchanged from its British predecessor model. In addition, visa-free entry acceptance regulations into Hong Kong for passport holders of some 170 countries remain unchanged before and after 1997.
  - Macau: The Immigration Department of Macau, under the Public Security Police Force, is the government agency responsible for immigration matters, whilst the Public Security Police Force itself is responsible for enforcing immigration laws in Macau.
  - Mainland China: Border control in Mainland China is the responsibility of National Immigration Administration (NIA; Chinese: 国家移民管理局; pinyin: Guójiā Yímín Guǎnlǐ Jú)), a unit of the Ministry of Public Security (MPS; Chinese: 公安部; pinyin: Gōng'ānbù). Customs related border controls are largely within the purview of the General Administration of Customs of the People's Republic of China.

== India ==
Border control in India is performed by a variety of organisations, each focusing on a distinct section of its external borders.

- Border Security Force: The Border Security Force, or BSF, is the primary border defence organisation of India. It is one of the five Central Armed Police Forces of the Union of India, it was raised in the wake of the 1965 War on 1 December 1965, "for ensuring the security of the borders of India and for matters connected there with". From independence in 1947 to 1965, the protection of India's international boundaries was the responsibility of local police belonging to each border state, with little inter-state coordination. BSF was created as a Central government-controlled security force to guard all of India's borders, thus bringing greater cohesion in border security. BSF is charged with guarding India's land border during peacetime and preventing transnational crime. It is a Union Government Agency under the administrative control of the Ministry of Home Affairs. It currently stands as the world's largest border guarding force.
- Assam Rifles: The Assam Rifles, one of India's oldest continuously existent paramilitary units, has been responsible for physical controls on the border between India and Myanmar since 2002. The border area between India, Myanmar, and China is largely made up of minority groups, many of which are transboundary communities. Consequently, enforcing border controls is a challenge for all three countries, and porous sections of the border between India and Myanmar have historically been common since Myanmar was formerly a part of the British Indian Empire.
- Indo–Tibetan Border Police: The Indo-Tibetan Border Police (ITBP) is charged with maintaining border controls on India's side of the extensive border between minority regions of India and China. In September 1996, the Parliament of India enacted the "Indo-Tibetan Border Police Force Act, 1992" to "provide for the constitution and regulation" of the ITBP "for ensuring the security of the borders of India and for matters connected therewith". The first head of the ITBP, designated Inspector General, was Balbir Singh, a police officer previously belonging to the Intelligence Bureau. The ITBP, which started with 4 battalions, has since restructuring in 1978, undergone expansion to a force of 56 battalions as of 2017 with a sanctioned strength of 89,432.

== Indonesia ==
The Directorate General of Immigration (Indonesian: Direktorat Jenderal Imigrasi) is the primary agency tasked with border control in Indonesia.

== Ireland ==
Border control for the Republic of Ireland is managed at major ports and airports by Border Management Unit, directed by the Immigration Service Delivery office of the Department of Justice, Home Affairs and Migration. The Garda National Immigration Bureau manages VISA and residency requirements. The Revenue Commissioners control customs and excise. As the Republic maintains a common travel area with the United Kingdom, there is no formal border control on the Northern Irish border.

== Iran ==
- Iranian Immigration & Passport Police: The Immigration & Passport Police Office is a subdivision of Law Enforcement Force of Islamic Republic of Iran with the authority to issue Iranian passports and deals with Immigrants to Iran. The agency is member of ICAO's Public Key Directory (PKD).
- Islamic Republic of Iran Border Guard Command: Islamic Republic of Iran Border Guard Command, commonly known as NAJA Border Guard, is a subdivision of Law Enforcement Force of Islamic Republic of Iran (NAJA) and Iran's sole agency that performs border guard and control in land borders, and coast guard in maritime borders. The unit was founded in 2000, and from 1991 to 2000, the unit's duties was done by of Security deputy of NAJA. Before 1991, border control was Gendarmerie's duty.

== Malaysia ==
- Immigration Department of Malaysia is responsible for regulating the entry and exit of people into and out of Malaysia. The department manages and maintains the country's immigration policies, including issuing visas, permits, and passes for visitors, students, and workers. It also enforces immigration laws, including detaining and deporting illegal immigrants and those who violate the terms of their visas or passes.
- Royal Malaysian Customs serves as the primary border control organization in Malaysia. Its main responsibility is to enforce customs laws and regulations at ports of entry, including airports, seaports, and land borders. The department is tasked with preventing the smuggling of contraband and other illegal goods into the country while facilitating legitimate trade and travel.

== Mexico ==
In Mexico, there is 2 separated institutions responsible of regulating migration affairs, with continuous collaboration:

- The Secretariat of Foreign Affairs is responsible to provide to Mexican citizens of passports and visas or permits to foireigners, when the applications are done in the exterior.
- The National Institute of Migration is the authority responsible of regulating the entry of people from Mexico at entry points such as airports, freeways, and nautical ports. Its also responsible to provide visas to foreigners, when the applications or permits are done in Mexican territory. Also provides follow ups to foreigners after the entry to Mexico.

== Myanmar ==
In Myanmar, border security is a complex affair and are split between multiple entities.

- The Border Guard Police (BGP) handles border protection duties, primarily in western Myanmar, such as Rakhine State. It is not an independent agency and is a part of the Myanmar Police Force (MPF), itself a part of the Ministry of Home Affairs.
- The Border Guard Forces (BGF) act more as light infantry forces that support Myanmar Armed Forces operations. They are mostly made up of former ethnic fighters although major administrative and command positions are held by active-duty Myanmar Armed Forces service members.
- The Myanmar Coast Guard (MCG) handles maritime border protection duties and works together with the Myanmar Navy and the MPF's Maritime Police.
- The Ministry of Immigration and Population is the Myanmar government ministry responsible for immigration affairs such as regulating immigration and managing the country's borders. It also issues national identity documents such as the National Registration Card (NRC) system.
- The Ministry of Border Affairs is the government ministry in Myanmar responsible for the development and any other matters concerning the border regions and areas.

== North Korea ==
Border Security Command and Coastal Security Bureau are collectively responsible for restricting unauthorised cross-border (land and sea) entries and exits, in the early 1990s the bureaux responsible for border security and coastal security were transferred from the Ministry of State Security to the Ministry of National Defence. Sometime thereafter, the Border Security Bureau was enlarged to corps level and renamed the Border Security Command. Previously headquartered in Chagang Province, the Border Security Command was relocated to Pyongyang in 2002.

== Pakistan ==
Physical controls on Pakistan's international borders are managed by dedicated paramilitary units: the Pakistan Rangers on the border with India, the Frontier Corps with Afghanistan and Iran and the Gilgit−Baltistan Scouts with China and the Pakistan-administered side of the Line of Control.

- The Pakistan Rangers are two paramilitary law enforcement organisations whose primary mission is border defence on the border with India as well as internal security operations, and providing assistance to the police in maintaining law and order. Rangers is an umbrella term for:
  - the Punjab Rangers, headquartered in Lahore, responsible for guarding Punjab Province's 1,300 km long border with India;
  - the Sindh Rangers, headquartered in Karachi, defending Sindh Province's ~912 km long border with India.
- The Frontier Corps are four western provincial forces, part of the Civil Armed Forces. They operate along the external borders of the western provinces of Balochistan and Khyber Pakhtunkhwa and are the direct counterparts to the Rangers of the eastern provinces (Sindh and Punjab). The Frontier Corps comprises four separate organisations:
  - Frontier Corps Khyber Pakhtunkhwa (North) and Frontier Corps Khyber Pakhtunkhwa (South) stationed in Khyber Pakhtunkhwa province;
  - Frontier Corps Balochistan (North) and Frontier Corps Balochistan (South) stationed in Balochistan province.

Each force is headed by a seconded inspector general, who is a Pakistan Army officer of at least major-general rank, although the force itself is under the jurisdiction of the Interior Ministry. With a total manpower of approximately 80,000, the task of the Frontier Corps is to help local law enforcement in the maintenance of law and order, and to carry out border patrol and anti-smuggling operations. Some of the FC's constituent units such as the Chitral Scouts, the Khyber Rifles, Swat Levies, the Kurram Militia, the Tochi Scouts, the South Waziristan Scouts, and the Zhob Militia have regimental histories dating back to British colonial times and many, e.g. the Khyber Rifles, have distinguished combat records before and after 1947.

- The Gilgit−Baltistan Scouts are part of the Civil Armed Forces, under the direct control of the Ministry of the Interior of the Government of Pakistan. The Scouts are an internal and border security force with the prime objective to protect the China–Pakistan border and support Civil Administration in ensuring maintenance of law and order in Gilgit-Baltistan and anywhere else in Pakistan. The force was formerly known as the Northern Areas Scouts but was renamed to the Gilgit−Baltistan Scouts in 2011.
- The Maritime Security Agency is responsible for guarding the southern maritime border.
- Pakistan Customs is responsible for customs-related border security measures.

== Schengen Area ==
Border control in the Schengen Area is primarily performed by the national authorities of individual member states. Consequently, there are many distinct organisations involved with border control along the area's external frontiers and at sea and air ports of entry within its members states.

- (European Union) European Border and Coast Guard Agency or (Frontex): Frontex is the Schengen Area's multilateral border control organisation. It is headquartered in Warsaw and operates in coordination with the border and coast guards of individual Schengen Area member states. According to the European Council on Refugees and Exiles (ECRE) and the British Refugee Council, in written evidence submitted to the UK House of Lords inquiry, Frontex fails to demonstrate adequate consideration of international and European asylum and human rights law including the 1951 Convention relating to the Status of Refugees and EU law in respect of access to asylum and the prohibition of refoulement. In September 2009, a Turkish military radar issued a warning to a Latvian helicopter conducting an anti-migrant and anti-refugee patrol in the eastern Aegean Sea to leave the area as it is in Turkish airspace. The General Staff of the Turkish Armed Forces reported that the Latvian Frontex aircraft had violated Turkish airspace west of Didim. According to a Hellenic Air Force announcement, the incident occurred as the Frontex helicopter —identified as an Italian-made Agusta A109— was patrolling a common route used by people smugglers near the small isle of Farmakonisi. Another incident took place in October 2009 in the airspace above the eastern Aegean sea, off the island of Lesbos. On 20 November 2009, the Turkish General Staff issued a press note alleging that an Estonian Border Guard aircraft Let L-410 UVP taking off from Kos on a Frontex mission had violated Turkish airspace west of Söke. As part of the Border and Coast Guard a Return Office was established with the capacity to repatriate immigrants residing illegally in the union by deploying Return Intervention Teams composed of escorts, monitors, and specialists dealing with related technical aspects. For this repatriation, a uniform European travel document would ensure wider acceptance by third countries. In emergency situations such Intervention Teams will be sent to problem areas to bolster security, either at the request of a member state or at the agency's own initiative. It is this latter proposed capability, to be able to deploy specialists to member states borders without the approval (Note: When deficiencies in the functioning of the border management system of a Member State are identified by Frontex, the Agency will be empowered to require that Member States to take timely corrective action. In urgent situations that put the functioning of the Schengen area at risk or when deficiencies have not been remedied, the Agency will be able to step in to ensure that action is taken on the ground even where there is no request for assistance from the Member State concerned or where that Member State considers that there is no need for additional intervention.) of the national government in question that is proving the most controversial aspect of this European Commission plan.
- Direction centrale de la police aux frontières: The Direction centrale de la police aux frontières (DCPF) is a directorate of the French National Police that is responsible for border control at certain border crossing points and border surveillance in some areas in France. They work alongside their British counterparts at Calais, and along the Channel Tunnel Rail Link with the British Transport Police. The DCPF is consequently largely responsible for Schengen Area border controls with the United Kingdom.
- (France) Direction générale des douanes et droits indirects: The Directorate-General of Customs and Indirect Taxes, commonly known as les douanes, is a French law enforcement agency responsible for levying indirect taxes, preventing smuggling, surveilling borders and investigating counterfeit money. The agency acts as a coast guard, border guard, sea rescue organisation and a customs service. In addition, since 1995, the agency has replaced the Border Police in carrying out immigration control at smaller border checkpoints, in particular at maritime borders and regional airports.
- Finnish Border Guard: The Finnish Border Guard, including the coast guard, is the agency responsible for border control related to persons, including passport control and border patrol. The Border Guard is a paramilitary organisation, subordinate to the Ministry of the Interior in administrative issues and to the President of the Republic in issues pertaining to the president's authority as Commander-in-Chief (e.g. officer promotions). The Finland-Russia border is a controlled external border of the Schengen Area, routinely patrolled and protected by a border zone enforced by the Border Guard. Finland's borders with Norway and Sweden are internal Schengen borders with no routine border controls, but the Border Guard maintains personnel in the area owing to its search and rescue (SAR) duties. There are two coast guard districts for patrolling maritime borders. In peacetime, the Border Guard trains special forces and light infantry and can be incorporated fully or in part into the Finnish Defence Forces when required by defence readiness. The Border Guard has police and investigative powers in immigration matters and can independently investigate immigration violations. The Border Guard has search and rescue (SAR) duties, both maritime and inland. The Guard operates SAR helicopters that are often used in inland SAR, in assistance of a local fire and rescue department or other authorities. The Border Guard shares border control duties with Finnish Customs, which inspects arriving goods, and the Finnish Police, which enforces immigration decisions such as removal.
- Koninklijke Marechaussee: The Koninklijke Marechaussee (English: Royal Military Constabulary) is a branch of the Netherlands Armed Forces and are responsible for border control functions as well as guarding national borders and ports of entry, notably Amsterdam Schiphol Airport and Eurostar terminals at Amsterdam Centraal and Rotterdam Centraal. At Schiphol Airport, the Koninklijke Marechaussee operates a criminal investigations department and combats drugs trafficking in cooperation with FIOD for both passenger and air freight.
- Swedish Border Police: Border control duties in Sweden are handled by a special group in the police force. Sweden has natural land borders only to Norway and Finland, where there are no border controls, so border surveillance is not done there apart from customs control. Therefore, border control is focused on some fixed control points, during the border control-less Schengen period until 2015 mainly airports. The introduction of full border control from Denmark and the continent in 2015 put a heavy load on the border police who had to check 8000 cars and 50 trains per day coming over the Öresund Bridge, and 3000 cars in Helsingborg and more in other ferry ports. The police quickly educated several hundred semi-authorised border control guards who had to ask the real officers to take over any doubtful case. The customs office and the coast guard can not do formal border controls, but can stop people in doubtful cases and ask police to take over.

== Singapore ==
The Immigration and Checkpoints Authority, or ICA, is the border control agency of Singapore under the Ministry of Home Affairs. The ICA is responsible for border control, border customs services, and immigration enforcement in Singapore. ICA is accountable to Parliament through the Minister for Home Affairs. The agency is in charge of maintaining all border checkpoints (Note: Land Commands; Tuas Command; Woodlands Command; Woodlands Train Checkpoint; Old Woodlands Checkpoint (Closed to most traffic except for motorcycles and lorries carrying cargo.); Airport Command; Singapore Changi Airport; Seletar Airport; Air Cargo Command; Airport Logistics Park of Singapore; Changi Airfreight Centre; Parcel Post Section; Ports Command; Port of Singapore; Sembawang Port; Jurong Port; Keppel Distripark; Ports Command HQ; Coastal Command; Singapore Cruise Centre; Marina Bay Cruise Centre Singapore; Tanah Merah Ferry Terminal; Changi Ferry Terminal; Changi Point Ferry Terminal; Jurong Fishery Port; Marina South Pier; West Coast Pier) in Singapore. In addition, ICA handles anti-terrorism operations and is responsible for many visa and residence related aspects of border control.

== South Korea ==
Korea Immigration Service, is a part of Ministry of Justice, responsible for protecting border control Enforcement. Korea Immigration Service issues Visa, controls traffic of Human at Port of entry and Immigration

Korea Customs Service, is a part of Ministry of Economy and Finance, responsible for enforce Customs such as Tariff and movement of goods at Port of entry

== South Africa ==
The Joint Operations Division is a component of the South African National Defence Force that patrols the land borders and oceanic territory. The National Border Control Unit of the South African Police Service works in ports and airports. Since 2020, The Border Management Agency (BMA), a branch of the Department of Home Affairs overseas border controls at ports and airports.

== Taiwan ==
In areas controlled by the Republic of China, (Note: The area under the definition consists of: Taiwan (Chinese: 台灣); Penghu (Chinese: 澎湖); Kinmen (Chinese: 金門; pinyin: Jīnmén); Matsu Islands (Chinese: 馬祖列島; pinyin: Mǎzǔ Lièdǎo); Other nearby islands) the National Immigration Agency (NIA; Chinese: 內政部移民署; pinyin: Nèizhèngbù Yímínshǔ), a subsidiary organisation of the Ministry of the Interior, is responsible for border control. The agency is headed by the Director General. The current Director-General is Chiu Feng-kuang. The agency was established in early 2007 and its job includes the care and guidance of new immigrants, exit and entry control, the deportation of undocumented migrants, and the prevention of human trafficking. The agency also deals with persons from mainland China, Hong Kong and Macau who do not hold household registration in the areas controlled by the ROC.

== United Kingdom ==
- HM Revenue and Customs: Customs administration related to border controls in the United Kingdom largely fall within the jurisdiction of HM Revenue and Customs.
- UK Visas and Immigration (UKVI): UKVI operates the visa aspect of the United Kingdom's border controls, managing applications from foreign nationals seeking to visit or work in the UK, and also considers applications from businesses and educational institutions seeking to become sponsors for foreign nationals. It also considers applications from foreign nationals seeking British citizenship.
- Border Force: The Border Force is in charge (Note: The organisation's primary responsibilities are: checking the immigration status of people arriving in and departing the UK; searching baggage, vehicles and cargo for unlawful goods or unauthorised migrants; patrolling the British coastline and searching vessels; gathering intelligence; alerting the police and security services to people of interest) of physical controls and checkpoints at airports, land borders, and ports. Since 1 March 2012, Border Force has been a law-enforcement command within the Home Office, accountable directly to ministers. Border Force is responsible for immigration and customs at 140 rail, air and sea ports in the UK and western Europe, as well as thousands of smaller airstrips, ports and marinas. The work of the Border Force is monitored by the Independent Chief Inspector of Borders and Immigration.
- Immigration Enforcement: Immigration Enforcement is the organisation responsible for enforcing border control policies within the United Kingdom, including pursuing and removing undocumented migrants.

== United States ==
Most aspects of American border control are handled by various divisions of the Department of Homelend Security (DHS).

- US Customs and Border Protection: U.S. Customs and Border Protection (CBP), a division of the DHS, is the country's primary border control organisation, charged with regulating and facilitating international trade, collecting import duties, and enforcing American trade, customs and immigration regulations. It has a workforce of more than 58000 employees. (Note: More than 21,180 CBP Officers inspect and examine passengers and cargo at over 300 ports of entry.; Over 2,200 CBP Agriculture Specialists work to curtail the spread of harmful pests and plant and animal diseases that may harm America's farms and food supply or cause bio- and agro-terrorism.; Over 21,370 Border Patrol Agents protect and patrol over 3000 kilometres of border with Mexico and over 8000 kilometres of border with Canada.; Nearly 1,050 Air and Marine Interdiction Agents prevent people, weapons, narcotics, and conveyances from illegal entry by air and water.; Nearly 2,500 employees in CBP revenue positions collect over $30 billion annually in entry duties and taxes through the enforcement of trade and tariff laws. In addition, these employees fulfill the agency's trade mission by appraising and classifying imported merchandise. These employees serve in positions such as import specialist, auditor, international trade specialist, and textile analyst.; The primary goal of the CBP Canine Programme is terrorist detection and apprehension. The programme conducts the largest number of working dogs of any federal law enforcement agency. K-9 teams are assigned to 73 commercial ports and 74 Border Patrol stations throughout the nation.) Every individual entering America is subject to inspection by Customs and Border Protection (CBP) officers for compliance with immigration, customs and agriculture regulations. Travellers are screened for a variety of prohibited items ranging from gold, silver, and precious metals to alcoholic beverages, firearms, and narcotics.
- Transport Security Administration: The Transport Security Administration, or TSA, is a division of the DHS responsible for conducting security checks at American airports and other transport hubs, including overseas preclearance facilities (with the notable exception of those in Canada, where CATSA conducts security checks prior to CBP immigration screening). For passengers departing by air from America, TSA screening is the only physical check conducted upon departure.
- Immigration and Customs Enforcement: Immigration and Customs Enforcement, or ICE, is the organisation responsible for enforcing immigration laws within America, focusing largely on deporting undocumented migrants. ICE operates detention centres throughout the country and approximately 34,000 undocumented migrants are imprisoned by ICE on any given day, in over 500 detention centres, jails, and prisons nationwide.
- United States Citizenship and Immigration Services: United States Citizenship and Immigration Services is responsible for various aspects of border control relating to immigration, including reviewing visa petitions and applications as well as processing asylum claims.
- State and local law enforcement agencies: Officers from police forces established by state, county, and municipal governments across America are deputised by ICE to detain undocumented migrants pursuant to Immigration and Nationality Act Section 287(g). Under section 287(g), ICE trains and authorises state and local law enforcement officers to identify, process, and detain undocumented migrants they encounter during their daily law-enforcement activity. The 287(g) programme has been criticised for increasing racist profiling by police and undermining community safety as the fear of deportation discourages undocumented migrants from reporting crimes or talking to law enforcement officers.

== Gallery ==
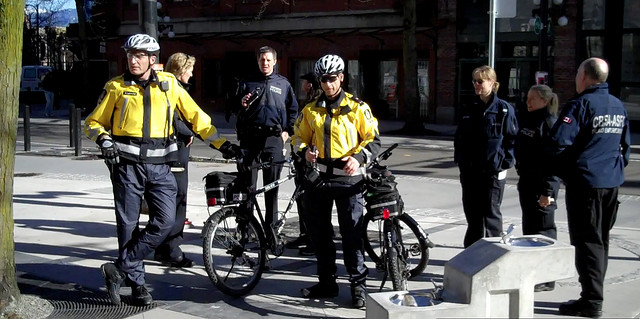
Canadian Border Security Agency officers and police in Vancouver

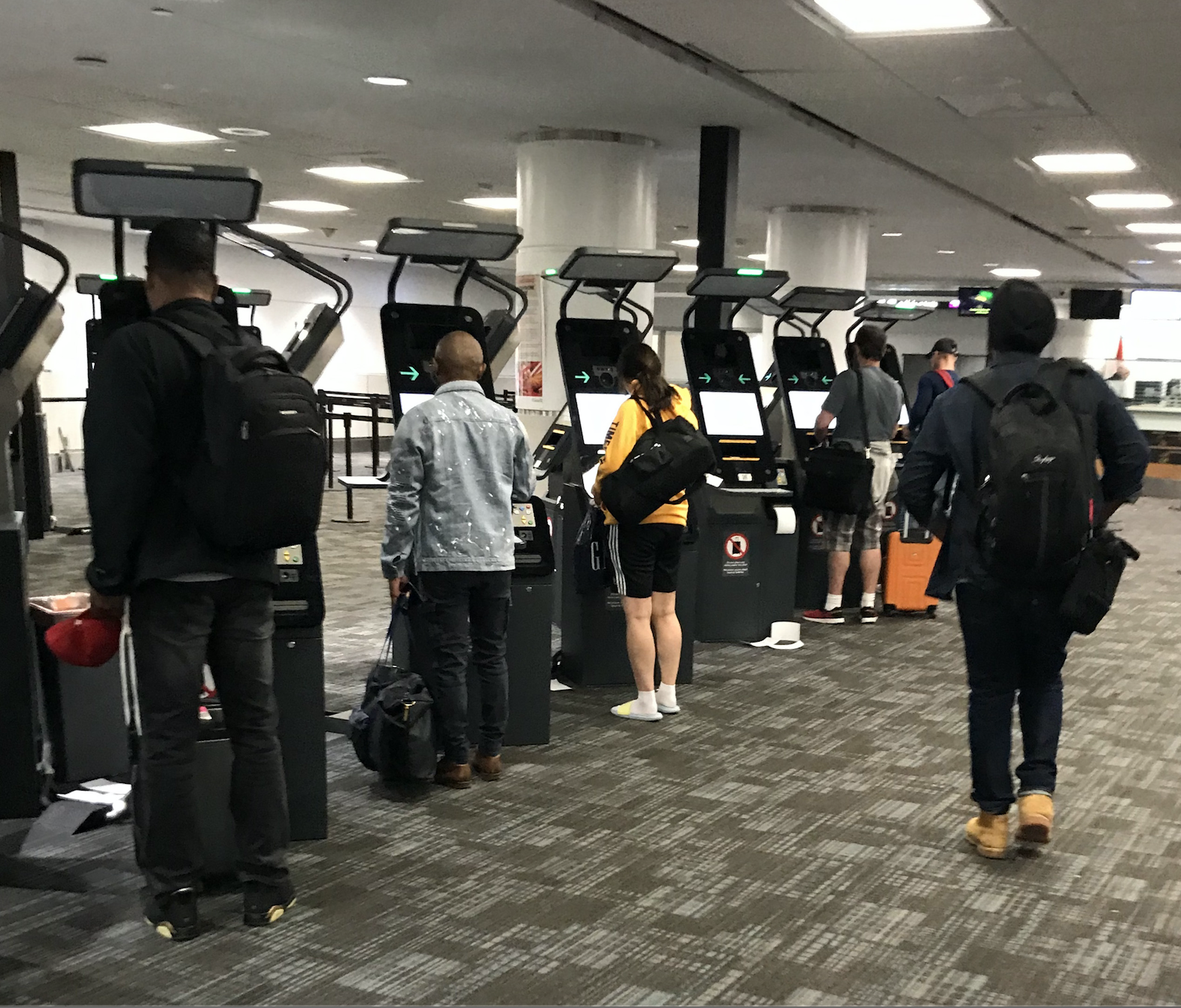
Automated passport control kiosks at Toronto Pearson International Airport

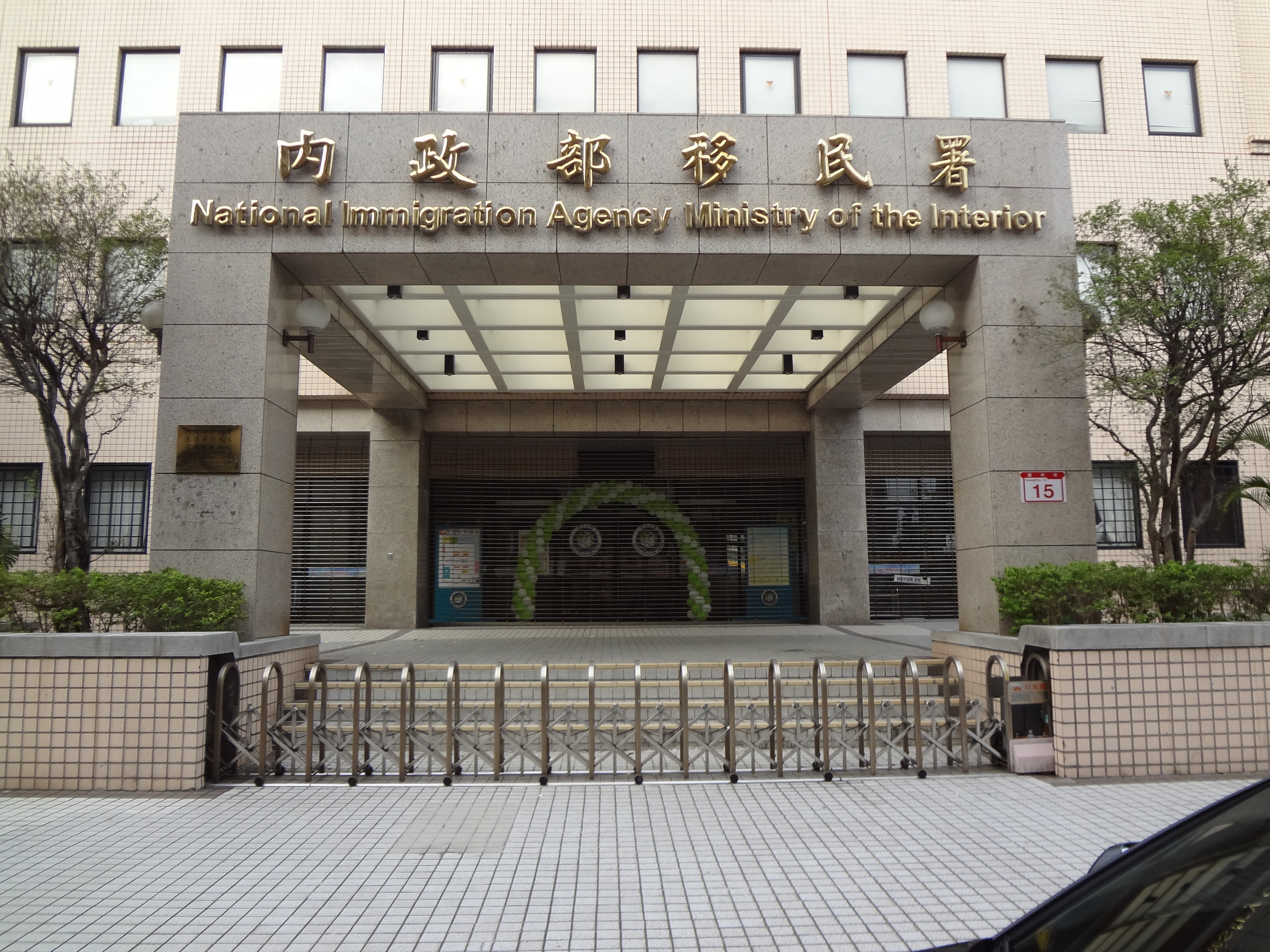
National Immigration Agency headquarters in Taipei.

Insignia of the Indian Border Security Force

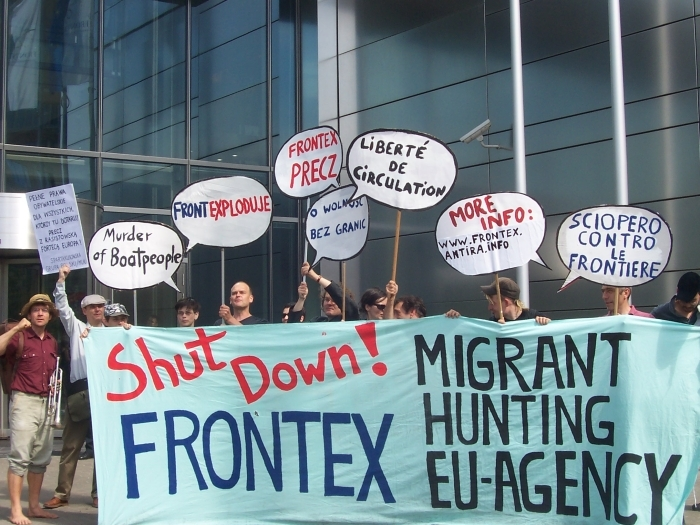
Protests against Frontex in Warsaw in 2008

Emblem of the Department of Homeland Security, the umbrella agency responsible for border control in America
