= Weng Jen-hsien Arson Case =

2016 crime in Taiwan

Weng Jen-hsien
- Born: 14 August 1965; Longtan Township, Taoyuan County, Taiwan Province, Republic of China (now Longtan District, Taoyuan City)
- Died: 1 April 2020 (aged 54); Taipei Detention Center, Tucheng District, New Taipei City, Taiwan
- Cause of death: Execution by shooting
- Criminal charges: Murder of lineal ascendants; murder

Details
- Victims: 11
- Date: 7 February 2016
- Country: Republic of China (Taiwan)
- State: Taoyuan City
- Killed: 6
- Injured: 5
- Weapons: Gasoline, machete
- Date apprehended: 5 days later

On 6 February 2016, Taiwanese man Weng Jen-hsien set fire to his family home in Longtan District, Taoyuan, using gasoline, killing six relatives and a caregiver and seriously injuring five others. In July 2019, the Supreme Court upheld his death sentence. He was executed by firing squad in April 2020. Following his death, no family members were willing to claim his body, making him the second executed prisoner in Taiwan whose remains were left unclaimed at a mortuary, after Chen Jui-chin in 2013.

== Early life ==
Weng Jen-hsien was socially withdrawn from an early age. He attended Longtan Junior High Schooland aspired to operate a farm and ranch. When applying to senior high school, he originally chose the Department of Animal Husbandry and Veterinary Science at Municipal Longtan Senior High School However, his parents changed his choice through his maternal uncle, resulting in his admission to the school's Mechanical Engineering Department. He eventually enrolled in the Automotive Repair Department of Liuhe Industrial Vocational High School.

Weng frequently complained about his parents' decision to alter his preferred field of study. After graduating from the Automotive Repair Department, he did not pursue further education. Following two years of military police service, he worked at fourteen different companies between 1981 and later years, but none of his employments lasted long. His longest period of employment was one year and ten months, while the shortest lasted less than one month. Eventually, he stopped engaging in paid work and lived in his family's old house, relying on financial support from relatives. This dependence led to strained relationships with his parents and elder brother. Weng believed that he had been unfairly treated and oppressed by them.

== Crime ==
On the evening of 6 February 2016, the eve of the Lunar New Year, Weng divided approximately 20 liters of gasoline into plastic bottles and milk containers. In the early hours of 7 February, during the Lunar New Year's Eve family reunion dinner, he took advantage of his family's inattention and poured gasoline throughout the Sanheyuan. He first set fire to two automobiles to prevent family members from escaping, then returned inside and splashed gasoline on relatives gathered in the dining room.

Weng immediately exited the house, ignited newspapers, and threw them into the dining room, setting fire to the gasoline. The blaze killed his parents, a caregiver, his nephew's wife, his nephew, and his niece, for a total of six fatalities, while five other people suffered severe burns.

=== Deaths ===
Name	Age	Relationship to Weng Jen-hsien	Remarks
Weng Ting-kai	84	Father	
Wei Chun-hsia	84	Mother	
Chang Chia-man	35	Wife of his second elder brother	
Weng Ning-wei	23	Niece	Died two days after being hospitalized.
Weng Ning-chi	23	Nephew	
Cheng Su-chin	55	None; caregiver	

== Arrest and trial ==
After evading capture for five days, Weng Jen-hsien was arrested by the Taoyuan City Police Department on the Northern Cross-Island Highway. He was indicted by the Taiwan Taoyuan District Prosecutors Office on charges including the murder of lineal ascendants. Before entering the courtroom, Weng made obscene gestures toward reporters and was stopped by court officers. He provocatively asked journalists, "Am I handsome?" During the trial, he repeatedly insulted the judge, calling him a "dinosaur judge", saying "nonsense", "disgraceful", "read more books", and "elementary school graduate". Before sentencing, he sat on the floor and declared that the judge was "not qualified" to order him to stand. He also told his relatives, "People can reincarnate dozens of times, and I will hunt you down dozens of times."

When the judge remarked that he and Weng were both Hakka people and the youngest children in their families, adding that "Hakka mothers usually dote on the youngest child", Weng responded coldly, "So what?"

The judge asked Weng why, if he hated his parents, he had also killed his nephew, niece-in-law, caregiver, and others. Weng smiled and replied, "They were just unlucky. Only the caregiver was truly innocent." When asked whether he was willing to look at photographs of his parents' charred bodies, he answered, "If you tell me to, I'll look." Weng further stated that he had felt sad when his pet Chihuahua died, but not when his parents and relatives died. Asked why he mourned the dog but not his family, he replied, "Because dogs don't deceive or harm people." When asked to give examples of how his family had wronged him, he laughed and said, "I've lost count." Asked whether he felt sorry for the deaths of his family members, he answered, "I didn't before, and of course I don't now." When asked whether he had ever considered his parents' efforts in raising him, he replied, "Are you sure parents in the old days all had such a hard time raising children?"

== Judgment ==
On 13 February 2017, the Taiwan Taoyuan District Courtsentenced Weng to Capital punishment for the murder of lineal ascendants and deprived him of civil rights for life.

On 8 March 2018, the Taiwan High Court upheld the death sentence and lifelong deprivation of civil rights. The court noted that one of the victims had been a minor and that the first-instance court had failed to consider the Child and Youth Welfare and Rights Protection Act. Accordingly, it vacated the original judgment and issued a revised one. However, the court held that Weng's crimes constituted "the most serious crimes" under Article 6, paragraph 2 of the International Covenant on Civil and Political Rights, and that the possibility of his rehabilitation and reintegration into society was extremely low. It therefore maintained the death sentence.

On 31 May 2018, the Supreme Court(Taiwan) vacated the judgment and remanded the case to the High Court for retrial, finding procedural defects in the psychiatric examination conducted in the previous proceedings.

On 20 February 2019, the Taiwan High Court, in the first retrial, again sentenced Weng to Capital punishment and deprived him of civil rights for life. The court cited expert reports concluding that he did not suffer from a major mental illness, noting that fantasies are common and do not in themselves constitute psychiatric disorders. It further held that Weng had shown no remorse after killing multiple close relatives, that his attitude had been extremely reprehensible, and that his crimes could not be forgiven.

On 10 July 2019, the Supreme Court, in its second review, vacated the previous judgment but unusually rendered its own decision, again sentencing Weng to Capital punishment and depriving him of civil rights for life, thereby finalizing the case.

The Supreme Court noted that Article 272 of the Criminal Code of the Republic of China concerning the murder of lineal ascendants had been amended and therefore modified the previous judgment accordingly. Nevertheless, it found that Weng had committed a grave offense, had extinguished all familial affection, was exceptionally vicious, and had shown no remorse or possibility of rehabilitation. Describing him as "the most evil murderer in history", the court held that the killing of multiple victims, including his parents, resulting in six deaths, constituted "the most serious crimes" under the two international covenants. It concluded that Weng's crimes had "provoked the indignation of both heaven and humanity and were intolerable under morality and the law", leaving no alternative but the death penalty, which was imposed together with lifelong deprivation of civil rights "to uphold the dignity of the law and preserve legal and ethical order".

== Execution ==
On 1 April 2020, Minister of Justice Tsai Ching-hsiang approved Weng's execution warrant. Weng's eldest brother, Weng Jen-kun, stated that he would not claim Weng's body, while his third brother, Weng Jen-chun, said that he no longer regarded Weng as family and felt nothing special about the execution. After relatives refused to retrieve the remains, prosecutors ordered that the body be temporarily stored at Zhongli Mortuary, where it arrived at around 10 p.m.

Weng's threatening remarks in his final message drew public criticism and led the Ministry of Justice（Taiwan）to revise the Rules Governing the Execution of Death Sentences. Under the revised rules, final messages containing threats, intimidation, or other content violating the law or public morality would no longer be delivered to family members. The amendment became informally known as the "Weng Jen-hsien Clause".

On 2 April 2020, in response to Weng's execution, Lin Hsin-yi, executive director of the Taiwan Alliance to End the Death Penalty, questioned the necessity of the execution, asking, "What harm would Taiwan suffer if he were not executed?" Others argued that the Ministry of Justice had been in the process of revising regulations governing executions and questioned the decision to carry out the sentence of a prisoner whose conviction had long been final despite the absence of any urgent circumstances.
