= Tenwin beverage controversy =

2024 food scandal in Taiwan

The Tenwin beverage controversy, or Shisheng beverage controversy, was a controversy surrounding ingredient labeling involving "Tenwin Aged Milk Tea" (Chinese: 十盛熟成奶茶專賣店, also known as "Shisheng beverage"), a beverage chain founded by Taiwanese internet personalities Kimi Ji and Hsiao Wu. On 20 July 2024, the Consumers' Foundation pointed out that the chain's official website advertised the use of "Hokkaido milk" while refusing to disclose the milk brand used in its products, triggering widespread criticism from netizens. On 21 July, Tenwin stated that its products had never been promoted as pure fresh milk tea. The following day, Chi and Hsiao Wu apologized and explained that the beverages contained aged milk formula and Uni-President fresh milk, with the aged milk formula consisting of Hokkaido milk powder imported from Japan and non-dairy creamer. The statement itself was later criticized as misleading. On 26 December 2025, all Tenwin branches ceased operations, with some commentators linking the closures to the controversy.

== Incident ==
On 12 April 2024, Kimi Ji and Hsiao Wu established Tenwin Aged Milk Tea. On 20 July, the chain was criticized by the Consumers' Foundation over unclear ingredient labeling. The foundation noted that although the company had informed consumers that its beverages were made from "aged milk and fresh milk", its official website only displayed the words "Hokkaido milk". The company also refused to disclose the milk brand used, making it impossible to verify the proportion of Hokkaido milk contained in the products.

Following the foundation's criticism, numerous internet users left comments on the company's official Instagram account. Chi responded by deleting the comments. On 21 July, Tenwin issued a statement on its website, emphasizing that its aged milk tea products were made using dairy ingredients sourced from Hokkaido and blended with Taiwanese fresh milk. The company stated that it had never promoted or emphasized the products as pure fresh milk tea. An inspection by the Taipei City Department of Health found no violations. Hsiao Wu later suggested that the controversy might have been manipulated by competitors.

On 22 July, Chi and Hsiao Wu jointly published an apology statement, clarifying that none of the drinks were pure fresh milk tea but instead consisted of "aged milk formula and Uni-President fresh milk". They explained that the aged milk formula used Hokkaido whole milk powder imported from Japan together with non-dairy creamer. They apologized for shortcomings in management and communication and pledged to improve. At the same time, Tenwin updated its menu to indicate that the aged milk formula contained non-dairy creamer and changed the wording "Hokkaido milk" to "Hokkaido formula".

Critics argued that the statement failed to address accusations of false advertising and consumers' misunderstanding that the milk itself originated from Hokkaido. Some users on Dcard, under the title "I don't understand why Chi Pu-hsin and Hsiao Wu feel wronged", pointed out that the brand's official website used the phrase "milk from Japan", that its logo resembled a milk can, and that the name "Tenwin" (Chinese: 十盛) closely resembled "Tokachi" (Japanese: 十勝), a region in Hokkaido famous for dairy products. They argued that these marketing methods misled consumers into believing the products were made with Hokkaido fresh milk.

On 26 July, Hsiao Wu uploaded a video apology, but criticism continued. In addition to accusing him of deceiving consumers, some netizens criticized Chi for not appearing in the video and accused her of shifting responsibility onto Hsiao Wu. Chi responded that Hsiao Wu had been stranded overseas because of a typhoon and was unable to film together with her, so she asked him to address the public first. Responding to accusations that she had not apologized in a video, Chi stated that she had already issued a written apology and replied "Are you illiterate?" to one user who demanded a video apology, adding that she would not tolerate false accusations and excessive attacks. Her remarks in turn drew further criticism.

After the controversy, multiple Tenwin branches closed. Several media outlets described the phenomenon as a "wave of store closures" and linked it to the non-dairy creamer controversy. The company, however, stated that the closures resulted from the individual plans of franchise owners. As of May 2025, fifteen branches remained in operation. On 26 December 2025, the final outlet, the Taoyuan Zhongzheng Branch, closed permanently, marking the end of the Tenwin beverage chain.
