= Lin Yuru =

Lin Yuru or Lin Yu-ju may refer to:

- Tai-yi Lin (1926–2003), Chinese-American writer and translator
- Lin Yuru (criminal) (born 1982), Taiwanese serial killer
