= Human trafficking in Taiwan =

In 2008, Taiwan was primarily a destination for men, women, and children trafficked for the purposes of forced labor and sexual exploitation. It is also a source of women trafficked to Japan, Australia, the United Kingdom, and the United States. Women and girls from the People's Republic of China (P.R.C.) and Southeast Asian countries were trafficked to Taiwan through fraudulent marriages, deceptive employment offers, and illegal smuggling for sexual exploitation and forced labor. Many trafficking victims were workers from rural areas of Vietnam, Thailand, Indonesia, and the Philippines, employed through recruitment agencies and brokers to perform low skilled work in Taiwan’s construction, fishing, and manufacturing industries, or to work as domestic servants. Such workers were often charged high job placement and service fees, up to $14,000, resulting in substantial debt that labor brokers or employers use as a tool for involuntary servitude. Many foreign workers remained vulnerable to trafficking because legal protections, oversight by authorities and enforcement efforts were inadequate.

Taiwan authorities have reported that traffickers continue to use fraudulent marriages to facilitate labor and sex trafficking, despite increased efforts by the authorities to prevent this practice. Some women who are smuggled onto Taiwan to seek illegal work were sometimes sold in auctions to sex traffickers, and subsequently forced to work in the commercial sex industry. NGOs reported a sharp increase during the reporting period in the number of boys rescued from prostitution, mainly discovered during police investigations of online social networking sites suspected of being front operations for prostitution rings.

Taiwan authorities made clear progress during 2008 by improving efforts to investigate and prosecute trafficking cases, approving amendments to Taiwan’s Immigration Act that will significantly enhance legal protections for trafficking victims, and approving a budget plan of $12.6 million for victim protection measures. In 2009 the Human Trafficking Prevention Act (HTPA) was passed.

The U.S. State Department's Office to Monitor and Combat Trafficking in Persons placed the country in "Tier 1" in 2017 Taiwan remained on Tier 1 in 2020, and 2023.

As of mid-2024, the country has not ratified the 2000 UN TIP Protocol.

== Sex trafficking ==
Taiwanese and foreign women and girls are sex trafficked in Taiwan. They are raped and harmed in brothels, hotel rooms, and other locations throughout the country.

== Prosecution ==
The Taiwanese government made significant efforts in investigating and prosecuting trafficking crimes over the last year, particularly involving labor exploitation. Taiwan does not have a comprehensive anti-trafficking law, but a number of its laws collectively criminalize most forms of trafficking. Section 296 and 296-1 of Taiwan’s criminal code prohibit slavery and the use of coercion or deception to exploit a victim, but existing legal definitions and proof burdens hamper prosecutors’ ability to obtain convictions in cases involving fraudulent recruitment, coercion, or deception. One convicted under Section 296 or 296-1 can face up to seven years in prison. The Labor Standards Law, which prohibits forced labor under Articles 5 and 75, ensures overtime rates, and sets limits on the work-day and work-week. However, this law does not apply to the 160,000 foreign workers employed as private nursing caregivers or domestic helpers on Taiwan, who are especially vulnerable to labor exploitation.

Typical punishments imposed on offenders convicted of forced labor under the Labor Standards Law are fines or imprisonment of less than one year. All employers of foreign laborers are covered by the Employment Service Act, which punishes labor trafficking offenses with fines, jail time, or both. The Ministry of Justice took commendable steps during the reporting period to standardize data on trafficking to obtain more precise statistics on sex and labor trafficking cases. The Ministry of Interior reports that authorities commenced prosecutions against 423 individuals for suspected trafficking in 2007, most of which were sex trafficking cases. Also in 2007, 74 individuals were convicted, including 16 for sexual exploitation of a minor, 53 individuals for sexual exploitation, and five for labor exploitation. However, most individuals convicted of sexual and labor exploitation of adults received a sentence of less than one year. During the reporting period, there were confirmed incidents of several local authorities accepting bribes and sexual services in return for ignoring illegal sex and labor trafficking activities. Of the nine local authorities charged with aiding or abetting trafficking activities in 2007, one was sentenced to 12 years in prison and the remaining eight cases are still pending. The Taiwan Criminal Investigation Bureau continued to assist U.S. law enforcement authorities in investigations of Taiwan-based smuggling networks involved in trafficking women to the United States.

On 6 November 2008, the Anti-Human Trafficking law draft bill was approved and the government was hoping that it would be pushed to approval from the Taiwan legislature in the near future, to greatly contribute to prevention measures that the government has adopted to combat human trafficking. The bill would impose a 10-year term of imprisonment and a NT$10 million ($305,000 US dollar) fine for traffickers convicted of forcing victims to engage in prostitution.

A study published in 2017, used the court proceedings of prosecuted trafficking under the HTPA from all 21 districts in Taiwan from 2009 to 2012. The results are based on 37 court hearings, involving 195 women and girls that were victimized and 118 perpetrators.

The 2018 reporting period showed significant numbers of prosecutions, convictions, and identification of human trafficking. The Human Trafficking Prevention and Control Act (HTPCA) criminalized all forms of trafficking and implemented penalties of up to 7 years imprisonment. In 2019 amendments were made to the HTPCA, which took effect in July, increasing the penalties for individuals who “through recruitment, seduction, shelter, arrangement, assistance, exploitation, or other means, cause a child to act as a host or hostess in a bar or club or engage in acts associated with tour escort and singing or dancing companion services that involve sexual activities”.

In 2019, 143 trafficking investigations were conducted, including 32 labor trafficking and 111 sex trafficking. Also, that year, 122 individuals were newly prosecuted, including 48 individuals tried under the Child and Youth Sexual Exploitation Prevention Act (CYSEPA), 23 under the HTPCA, and 51 under other laws and criminal codes. The Fisheries Agency (FA) conducted a reported amount of 198 random inspections of fishing vessels. Which uncovered 88 violations related to contract issues, excessive overtime and wage discrepancies.

== Protection ==
Protection efforts by Taiwan authorities have improved modestly, but remained inadequate during the reporting period. The vast majority of trafficking victims in Taiwan continue to be undetected by law enforcement authorities. Although Taiwan has formal victim identification procedures and has provided training on these procedures, immigration officers, police, prosecutors, and other law enforcement personnel do not consistently follow the procedures. It is widely reported that authorities, particularly at the local level, fail to identify the vast majority of trafficking victims, classifying them instead as illegal immigrants or “runaway” foreign workers in illegal labor status. As a result, many trafficking victims are detained, prosecuted, fined, or jailed, and ultimately deported. The majority of victims are treated simply as illegal immigrants or illegal laborers, and housed in formal, long-term detention facilities, which are sometimes plagued by overcrowding and poor sanitation. While incarcerated, most detainees have no access to psychological or legal counseling, and only limited access to medical services. Only a small percentage of trafficking victims are properly identified and removed from detention facilities. Some trafficking victims who were formally identified as such were inappropriately incarcerated solely for unlawful acts that were a direct result of being trafficked.

During the reporting period, some identified victims, the majority of whom were held in detention facilities, were prosecuted for immigration, labor, and criminal law violations. In most cases, only those victims who cooperated with prosecutors in cases where charges were actually filed against the trafficker or other defendants were excused from punishment. The treatment afforded to victims varies considerably from place to place. The Council for Labor Affairs (CLA) provides subsidies to 11 NGO-operated shelters for trafficking victims. Most of those sheltered in these facilities were referred by churches, NGOs, or other informal channels. In July 2007, the Executive Yuan approved the “Human Trafficking Implementation Plan,” setting aside $12.6 million for construction and improvement of shelter facilities, education, and training for authorities. During the reporting period, the National Immigration Agency solicited bids to operate a shelter for trafficking victims, but when no NGOs bid for the funds, which they deemed insufficient, the Legislative Yuan (LY) cut the funding allocation from the 2008 budget. Although the LY amended Taiwan’s immigration law to provide additional protections to trafficking victims in 2007, these amendments have not yet gone into effect.

Protection efforts were increased by Taiwan authorities in 2017. That year 328 trafficking victims were identified, including 209 exploited in sex trafficking and 119 from forced labour, to which 298 were referred to shelters for assistance. The National Immigration Agency (NIA) operated a shelter for foreign trafficking victims and continued construction on a second shelter. Both shelters were operated by the NIA the following year but due to security concerns, access to the shelters was limited to victims from the People’s Republic of China, which other nationals had access to other NGO shelter services. The Minister of Labor (MOL) subsidized an additional 22 shelters and operated a 24-hour hotline accessible to trafficking victims.

== Prevention ==
The Taiwan authorities report that their efforts to combat trafficking abroad are hampered by a lack of formal diplomatic relations with source-country governments and an inability to join relevant international organizations. Domestically, the Taiwan authorities used broadcast and print media to sensitize the public to the plight of trafficked women forced to work in Taiwan’s commercial sex industry. The authorities also continued an outreach program to enhance foreign workers’ understanding of their rights and the resources available to them, which included the distribution of multilingual emergency contact cards, announcements in foreign-language publications, and radio and television advertisements. The CLA spent $2.1 million in 2007 on 24 Foreign Labor Consultant Service Centers, which provide counseling, legal aid, and labor dispute resolution services to foreign workers. As part of an ongoing campaign to combat child sex trafficking, authorities on Taiwan displayed public service announcements at 680 cinemas nationwide and broadcast announcements on television and on online chat rooms frequented by Taiwan’s youth. Taiwan continues to operate an island-wide toll-free hotline for foreign spouses and foreign workers seeking assistance. Taiwan has an extraterritorial law criminalizing the sexual exploitation of children by Taiwan residents traveling abroad; however, it did not take other steps during the reporting year to reduce demand for child sex tourism.

In 2017 the cabinet-level minister-without-portfolio continue to implement the national plan of action and oversee an interagency working group. Advertisements, public service announcements, materials on human trafficking, and trainings for the vulnerable populations were continues to be funded by various agencies. International airport service counters and foreign-worker service stations around Taiwan were operated by authorities to raise awareness and educate foreign workers of their rights. These efforts were maintained in 2018, additionally NGO concerns were divided into two subgroups by authorities, one to focus on domestic workers and the other on migrant fishermen. The Fisheries Agency (FA) handed out information cards about workers' rights and hotline number to foreign crewmembers during random inspections.

Early 2019, the NIA launched a program for foreign individuals to willingly turn themselves in when they overstay their visas and receive reduced penalties. This program benefitted 2,300 foreign nationals during its first month of implementation.
