= Rape in Taiwan =

Rape in Taiwan is sexual assault involving sexual penetration carried out against a person without their consent in the nation. Victims and perpetrators include Taiwan citizens, residents, and foreign nationals from a wide range of backgrounds and every social class.

Victims, some who are lured into sex trafficking in Taiwan, are raped in hotels and other locations throughout the country. There have been women deceived by perpetrators in fake modeling photoshoots. Some are victims of drugging, kidnapping, gang rape, torture, murder, and sexual slavery. Rapes involving alcohol have occurred. Victims suffer from physical and psychological trauma, ostracization, and, at times, suicide. Rapes and attempted rapes have been committed by students, teachers, artists, television personalities, spa and massage workers, medical staff, Taiwan military personnel, and others.

== History ==
Rape was committed by Imperial Japanese Armed Forces personnel in Taiwan during the Asia–Pacific War. Comfort women from Taiwan were sex trafficked and sexually assaulted.

Rapes in the country in the 20th and 21st centuries include, but are not limited to, the rape and murder of Pai Hsiao-yen, the rapes of Lin Yi-han and Wong He, Justin Lee sex scandal, and crimes of Chang Tso-chi, Chen Jui-chin, Jung Myung-seok, Liang Yu-chih, and Sakuliu Pavavaljung.

In 1996, Taiwanese airman Chiang Kuo-ching was tortured into making a false confession of rape and murder of a five-year-old girl and was executed in 1997.
