= Sex trafficking in Taiwan =

Sex trafficking in Taiwan is human trafficking for sexual exploitation and slavery. Taiwan serves as a country of origin, destination, and transit for individuals who are sexually trafficked.

== Types of sex trafficking ==
Victims of sex trafficking include both Taiwanese citizens, primarily women and girls, being trafficked within Taiwan and abroad, as well as foreign victims trafficked into the country. Children, people living in poverty, and migrants are particularly vulnerable to sex trafficking. Victims are deceived, threatened, or forced into prostitution, and their passports and other documents are often taken. They suffer from physical and psychological abuse and trauma, and are typically kept in poor conditions, often guarded or locked up. Before 2022, Taiwan had maintained a tier 1 status of protection against human trafficking for 13 years straight in a series of reports released by the U.S. Department of State.

Male and female traffickers come from all social and economic classes in Taiwan. Traffickers are often members of, or are facilitated by, crime syndicates and gangs. The extent of sex trafficking in Taiwan is difficult to know because of the lack of data, the secretive nature of sex trafficking crimes, and other factors.

== Non-governmental organizations ==
The Taipei Women's Rescue Foundation rescues victims of sex trafficking in Taiwan.

== See also ==
- Rape in Taiwan
- Organized crime in Taiwan
