= Chen Jui-chin =

Taiwanese serial killer

- Born: 25 July 1949; Chiayi County, Taiwan
- Died: 19 April 2013 (aged 63); Taichung Prison, Taichung, Taiwan
- Cause of death: Execution by shooting
- Other name: "The Chiayi Demon"
- Convictions: Murder x6 Rape x1 Robbery x1 Attempted bribe x1
- Penalty: Death

Details
- Victims: 6–8
- Span of crimes: 1985–2003
- Country: ROC
- State: Chiayi
- Date apprehended: May 2003

Chen Jui-chin (Chinese: 陳瑞欽; pinyin: Chén Ruìqīn; 25 July 1949 – 19 April 2013) was a Taiwanese serial killer and one of the country's most infamous criminals. Because of his gambling addiction, he owed debts to loan sharks, and in order to pay them off, he turned towards violence. He murdered his spouse and three children, and fraudulently used their life insurance to amass $38 million NT, for which he was sentenced to 20 years imprisonment. Finally, he was sentenced to death for raping, robbing, and killing his girlfriend, Chen, from whom he stole millions worth of money. In total, he is suspected of killing eight people, including two female friends. In the media, he was nicknamed The Chiayi Demon.

According to the police investigation, two women remain missing: Huang Xin-cheng, a colleague of Chen and close friend of his second wife, Wang Shu-ying, who disappeared after going to the bank to withdraw $600,000 NT. The other was Zheng Wengqiuxiang, another colleague of Chen's from the Minxiong Oil Depot. One night, Chen and Zheng went out for some siu yeh, after which Zheng mysteriously vanished. Chen later claimed that both women were probably abducted by a man surnamed He, which the prosecutor doubted was true.

On 19 April 2013, Chen Jui-chin was executed in Taichung Prison (now located in the Taichung Detention Center).

== Case history ==
Chen Jui-chin graduated from junior high school and thereafter from the horticulture department of the National Chiayi University. He volunteered to be a soldier in the Air Force, from where he obtained the rank of officer and eventually a captain. After the CPC Corporation started laying off employees, where Chen worked, he instead quit and started searching for work as an oil allocation engineer. He was unable to find any, and as he reproached the idea of retiring, he applied for a job at the Newport Township Office Finance Section. However, because of his gambling habits, he owned money to loan sharks, and eventually resorted to killing his insured relatives so he could pay off the debts.

Chen married his first wife, Tseng Pi-hsia, in 1974. They had a son and two daughters together. On New Year's in 1985, Tseng accidentally slipped in the bathroom and suffered a concussion. Instead of helping his wife, Chen dragged her off the bed and slammed her head into the ground several times, killing Tseng. He lied by claiming that she had fallen off the bed and died of intracranial haemorrhage, swindling $2.35 million NT in insurance money. Only six months after her death, Chen remarried to an elementary school teacher named Wang Shu-ying. Wang had a son from a previous marriage, whom Chen adopted.

In 1988, Chen Jui-chin was heavily indebted and desperate for money. In order to obtain a fraudulent compensation of $4.6 million NT, he pretended to discipline his 15-year-old adopted son, slapping him so hard that the child fell and hit his head on the concrete wall. The child died as a result of the injury, with Chen claiming that it was an accident.

In 1995, facing another financial crisis, Chen targeted his own 15-year-old son. He took him to a heavy ornamental stone and hit the boy on the back of the head, cracking his skull. Chen lied about his son having died in a car accident, and fraudulently received $4.72 million NT.

In 1996, Chen learned that his second wife, Wang Shu-ying, had been coveting insurance claims and real estate for teachers. Under the pretence of going on a trip, the two drove to Xingang. Suddenly, Chen stopped the car, pulled out a wooden stick from under the driver's seat and beat his wife to death. After the murder, Chen dumped her body on Shixian Road in Chiayi, creating the illusion of a car accident. Since he had blood on his clothes, Chen was reluctant about catching a taxi back home. In this case, not only did he obtain Wang's insurance claims of $11.37 million NT, but also continued to receive her pension.

Chen's late wife often visited a clothing store owned by a woman named Yan Liqin, a widow with two children. After more than a month from his wife's death, Chen took the initiative to "entangle" himself around the clothing store. After strenuous pursuit, Yan was moved, and they married in 1997. Chen's vicious behaviour was unchanged, however, as he tried to fraudulently clear his debts the following year. Yan's 16-year-old son was having a headache, so Chen fed him sleeping pills, claiming that they were painkillers. While the son was sleeping, Chen transported him to the stairs, where he dropped him on his head, creating the illusion of an accidental death. He applied for an insurance claim of $15.5 million NT, but the insurance company, which had noticed that multiple relatives had died of suspicious injuries relating to head trauma, paid only $250,000. Since Yan also believed that her son had been murdered, she continued to investigate for possible evidence to prove it. Perplexingly, Chen tried to deceive his wife by putting on a condom on the boy's genitalia and explaining that he had died while having sex. Yan remained with him for a while, but as their relationship worsened, she divorced him. During the divorce, she was intimidated by Chen to pay a $1.2 million NT "breakup fee", but was otherwise left unharmed.

In 2000, many insurance companies discovered that the circumstances surrounding the deaths of Chen's relatives, especially his three sons, who all received "head injuries" and died from cerebral oedema, were suspicious, as all of them had been insured for millions of NT. After holding discussions with representatives of various companies, they unanimously agreed to prevent Chen Jui-chin from insuring people and reported this to the police. The then-legislator, Chen Chao-jung, was informed of this ordeal, and soon held a press conference expressing his doubts about the suspect. Chao-jung himself would later personally go and interrogate Chen, who, out of fear, hid under the table and refused to come out. The next day, he angrily announced before the media that he would "retain the right to pursue the lawsuit against the false accusations of legislators."

In May 2003, Chen Jui-chin met Chen Yi-ling, a female insurance saleswoman, with whom he started a romantic relationship. He noticed that she had considerable savings, and asked his new girlfriend to borrow some money for his mortgage, to which she replied that she would consider it. Although the pair only knew each other for two days, Chen Jui-chin planned to kill her directly and then rob her. He invited Chen Yi-ling by telephone to the Wu Xian Emperor's Temple on Xiangrong Street, in West Chiayi. From there, he took her to Zhushan in his black jeep. While there, he opened a capsule of sleeping Baogan Pills, and put sleeping powder in it. When Chen Yi-ling fell asleep, Chen Jui-chin tied her hands with nylon rope. When she awoke, Chen Jui-chin told her that he wanted to play, so he beat and eventually strangled his girlfriend into unconsciousness. When he saw the unconscious Chen Yi-ling, he suddenly felt aroused and attempted to have sex with her, but because of his sexual dysfunction, he instead sexually assaulted her. After he finished, Chen Jui-chin contemplated throwing Chen Yi-ling off a cliff, but unbearing of the thought of not stealing something, he robbed her of her gold Rolex watch, jadeite necklace, rings, $1 million NT in cash, credit and ATM cards, mobile phones and two blank checks. He then hit Yi-ling with a stone and beat her to death, throwing her body off the mountain cliff. After disposing of the corpse he went to Taipei with his other casual girlfriend, Xiao. On the way, he gave her the Rolex. He also held onto the deceased Chen's bank cards, but couldn't take the money because he didn't know the password. The attempted theft was detected by the authorities, and Chen was arrested.

Chen was arrested on 22 May 2003, at the Chiayi Christian Hospital, where he was seeking treatment for injuries suffered during a beating. Following his arrest, Chen Jui-chin confessed, in order, to killing Chen Yi-ling, Tseng Pi-hsia, his three children, and Wang Shu-ying, but claimed that he had nothing to do with the disappearances of his other female friends. After his death sentence was upheld, he retracted his confession and offered to help the police in locating the missing women, but his bluff was called out, as the investigators understood that he was just trying to weasel out of his execution. Chen Jui-chin was indicted by the Nantou District Prosecutors' Office in July 2003 on charges of rape and murder for the death of Chen Yi-ling. The prosecution sought the death penalty.

== Trial, appeal and execution ==
In December 2004, the Chiayi District Court sentenced Chen Jui-chin to five death sentences and one life sentence. At a fifth trial, the Tainan Branch of the Taiwan High Court reduced the death sentences to a 20-year-old fixed imprisonment term, because of his cooperation with punishment regulations and the application of commutation changes in law. He still remained with a death sentence for the murder of Chen Yi-ling, and the appeal for it was rejected by the Supreme Court. While on death row, he was detained at the Taichung Detention Center.

Between 2011 and 2013, Chen Jui-chin appealed to the Taichung Branch of the Taiwan High Court a total of eight times for a retrial, all of which were rejected. A protest was filed for the Supreme Court in 2011, but it was also dismissed.

On 19 April 2013, the Minister of Justice, Tseng Yung-fu, signed an execution warrant for Chen Jui-chin. Chen complained that the prosecutor had done it just to settle old scores. In retaliation, Attorney Liu countered his words, saying: "Put your grievances to rest, as the court has made a very clear investigation." Liu also silently chanted an old mantra, and prayed that the convict's soul be sent to Sukhavati. Chen Jui-chin took a deep and hearty inhale, but as the drugs administered weren't enough to kill him, he was induced into a coma and subsequently shot in the head. He was 63 years old.

The following day, since Chen had murdered all his male heirs, nobody came to collect his corpse after the autopsy. Even if he had agreed to donate his organs before death, no hospital agreed to take them, and so, the Legal Department had no choice to discard it in a funeral home. Cen's ex-wife, Yan Liqin, made a statement about the matter: "Nobody should collect the dead body. It is okay for the government to take him for reclamation. This person should have died long ago. There is no need to put him in the present. Their government is not effective. It was time for this man to be shot and he deserved it! The late justice is not justice."

== Details ==
- After Chen Jui-chin was arrested, he tried to bribe the policemen with $4 million NT, hoping that they would let him go, but it fell through. He was reported to have said: "I still have a piece of land in Zhongliao. If you let me escape, I can provide with you $4 million NT. If the value of the land is not enough, I can blackmail my third wife, Yan Liqin, who is divorced." (Note: After Chen said this, the undertaking police officer refused on the spot, and the prosecution investigated the case as attempted bribing of public officials) (Note: Even after his arrest, he showed a strong will for survival, going so far as to bribe the undertaking officer)
- Chen Jui-chin explained to the police that it was difficult for the forensic examiners to distinguish between "murders from head trauma" and "accidents from stumbling", so he that's why he chose such "conservative" methods of murder. (Note: He learned this after graduating from junior high school, so he killed his victims by such means)
- In addition to his wives, Chen Jui-chin also had several mistresses, most of whom provided him with money to squander on gambling. Authorities believe this related to his perseverance, during which he entangled with the woman he loved until she left him. (Note: Chen Jui-chin claimed that he had many girlfriends who provided money during his multiple marriages, so he had no need to commit crimes. As long as he liked the woman, there was nothing he felt the need to pursue.) They also pointed out that he had a "fighting nature", and that there were unique points in his interactions with the girlfriends. (Note: This statement was made by Wu Guoming, the head of the criminal branch of the Chiayi Police Station)
- While in the detention centre, Chen Jui-chin sent a letter to another criminal named Su, claiming to know the whereabouts of the two missing women: Huang Xin-cheng and Zheng Wengqiuxiang. He was interrogated about those claims, as police believed that he was genuinely responsible for the deaths, but it was determined that it was just a plan to avoid prison time. (Note: The letter was written as a simple means of borrowing time to find a chance to escape)
- Chen Jui-chin wrote down the birthdates, dates and years of death of his murdered relatives in a small notebook, which he studied day and night. (Note: Paradoxically, Chen Jui-chin described his victims as cold-hearted, but in the mentioned notebook, he described their deaths in special ways. He did not elaborate on the meaning.) According to the investigation, he never killed on birthdays to avoid sacrifices to the Sun, which speculations claim was to obtain a 'clear card' to avoid betting on Mark Six. (Note: He had a main card of the family god, and the ancestors of the Chen family enshrined in it.)

== See also ==
- Lin Yuru
- List of serial killers by country
