= The Storm Media =

News media company in Taiwan

- Native name: 風傳媒
- Industry: News
- Founded: 2014 (12 years ago)
- Headquarters: Taipei, Taiwan

Chinese name
- Traditional Chinese: 風傳媒
- Simplified Chinese: 风传媒
Transcriptions
Standard Mandarin
- Hanyu Pinyin: Fēng Chuánméi

YouTube information
- Channel: @TheStormMedia
- Website: www.storm.mg

The Storm Media (Chinese: 風傳媒) is an online news media headquartered in Neihu District, Taipei, Taiwan, offering media services in Chinese and Japanese.

== Overview ==
Founder David Chang was the general manager of Goldman Sachs Taipei Branch and served as a consultant to Fubon Financial Holdings after retirement. Publisher Wang Chien-chuang is a professor at Shih Hsin University. The start-up capital of The Storm Media, NT$60 million, was all Chang's personal investment. The editorial team comes from the China Times newspaper group and Next Magazine.

The Storm Media has cooperated with many media outlets in Taiwan and has signed contracts with overseas news media such as BBC Chinese, Asahi Shimbun Chinese, Deutsche Welle, Xinhua News Agency, and The Wall Street Journal to become long-term content partners.

In April 2017, The Storm Media announced the acquisition of The Journalist and Taiwan Indicator Survey Research.

== Blockage ==
According to GreatFire testing, its website has been blocked in mainland China by the authorities' Internet Wall, meaning that local netizens are unable to access the website normally. The blockage has been in place since May 2015.
