= National Immigration Agency =

Immigration authority of Republic of China (Taiwan)

Agency overview
- Formed: 2 January 2007
- Jurisdiction: Taiwan (Republic of China)
- Headquarters: 15 Guangzhou Street, Zhongzheng, Taipei
- Agency executive: Chiu Feng-kuang, Director-General
- Parent agency: Ministry of the Interior (Taiwan)
- Website: www.immigration.gov.tw

Chinese name
- Traditional Chinese: 內政部移民署
Transcriptions
Standard Mandarin
- Hanyu Pinyin: Nèizhèngbù Yímínshǔ
Hakka
- Romanization: nui ziin pu yì-mìn-su
Southern Min
- Hokkien POJ: Luē-chèng-pō͘ Î-bîn-sú

The National Immigration Agency of the Ministry of the Interior (NIA; Chinese: 內政部移民署) is the statutory agency under the Ministry of Interior of the Republic of China (Taiwan) which is responsible for immigration, entry and exit security, border services and registration of foreigners. The agency is headed by the Director General. The current Director-General is Jeff Jia-Jun Yang.

The agency does not manage customs, which is managed by the Customs Administration, Ministry of Finance.

== History ==
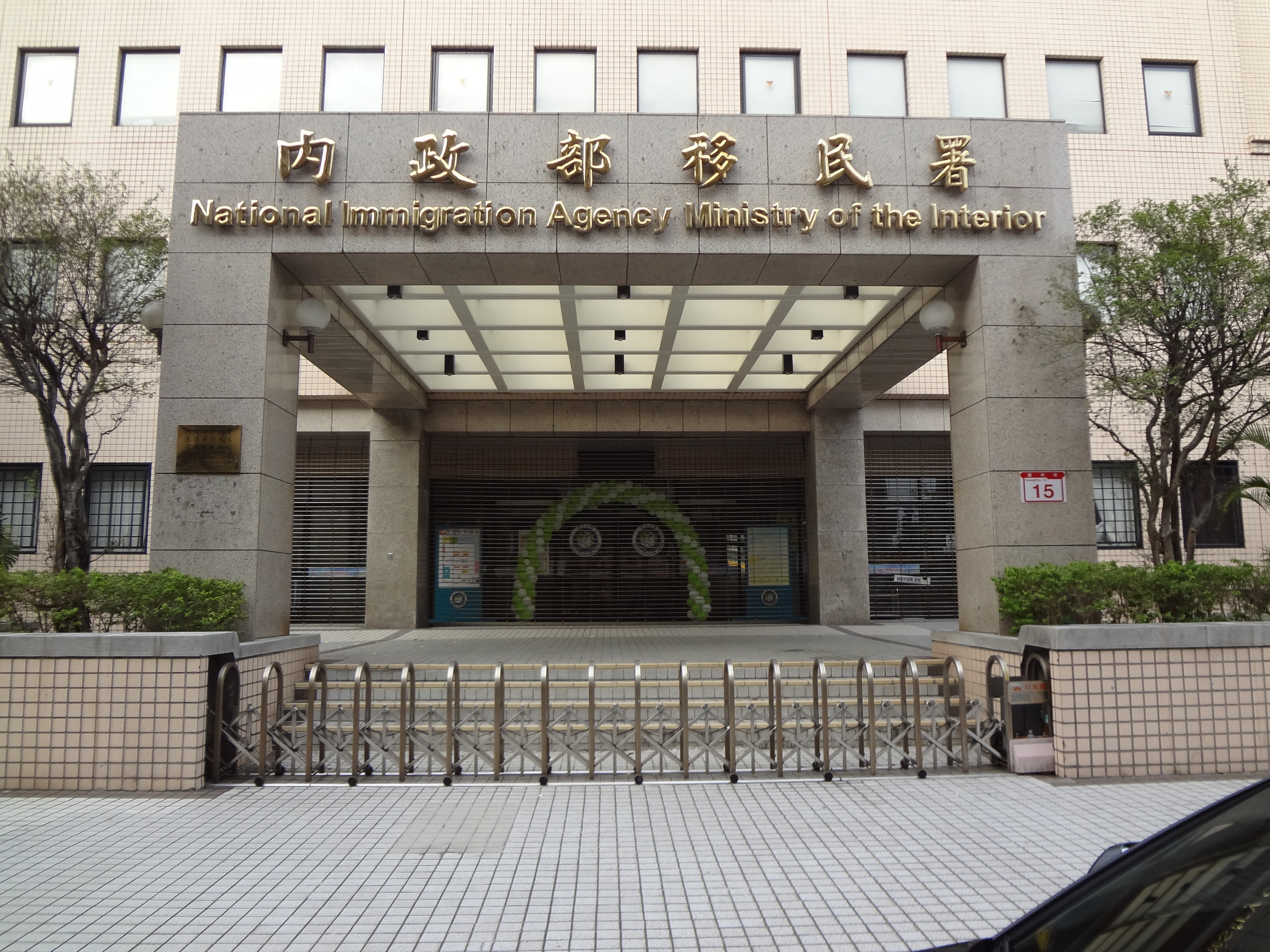
National Immigration Agency entry.

The agency was established in early 2007 to deal with immigration and border control. This include the care and guidance of new immigrants, exit and entry control, the inspection on illegal immigrants, the forcible deportation, and the prevention of trafficking in persons. The agency also deals with documents of foreigners and nationals of the People's Republic of China (including mainland China, Hong Kong and Macau).

Prior to that it was known as the Taiwan Garrison Command and Taiwan Province Police Department. It was initially in charge of Taiwan's border control for both military personnel and civilians respectively. In 1952, Military Personnel and Civilians Exit and Entry United Scrutiny Department was established and became the authority for border control.

In March 1957, the department's name was changed to Entry and Exit Control Department, subordinated to Taiwan Vigilance Headquarters and then to Taiwan Garrison Headquarters created in July 1958. In 1972, the government delegated border control, originally under the defense establishment, to a common administrative agency in response to the needs for social development and consequently the Immigration Bureau under the National Police Agency was established.

For years, Taiwan's border control and immigration had been separately administered by various agencies, resulting in the administrative inefficiency. The Immigration Act was promulgated on 21 May 1999, which proposed the National Immigration Agency or NIA, shall be established under the Ministry of the Interior (Taiwan) to be responsible of border control and immigration. Subsequently, other statutes related to the NIA were also drafted and then passed by the Legislative Yuan on 8 November 2005 and promulgated by the President on 11 November 2005. Therefore, the NIA has been officially established since 2 January 2007.

== Department structure ==
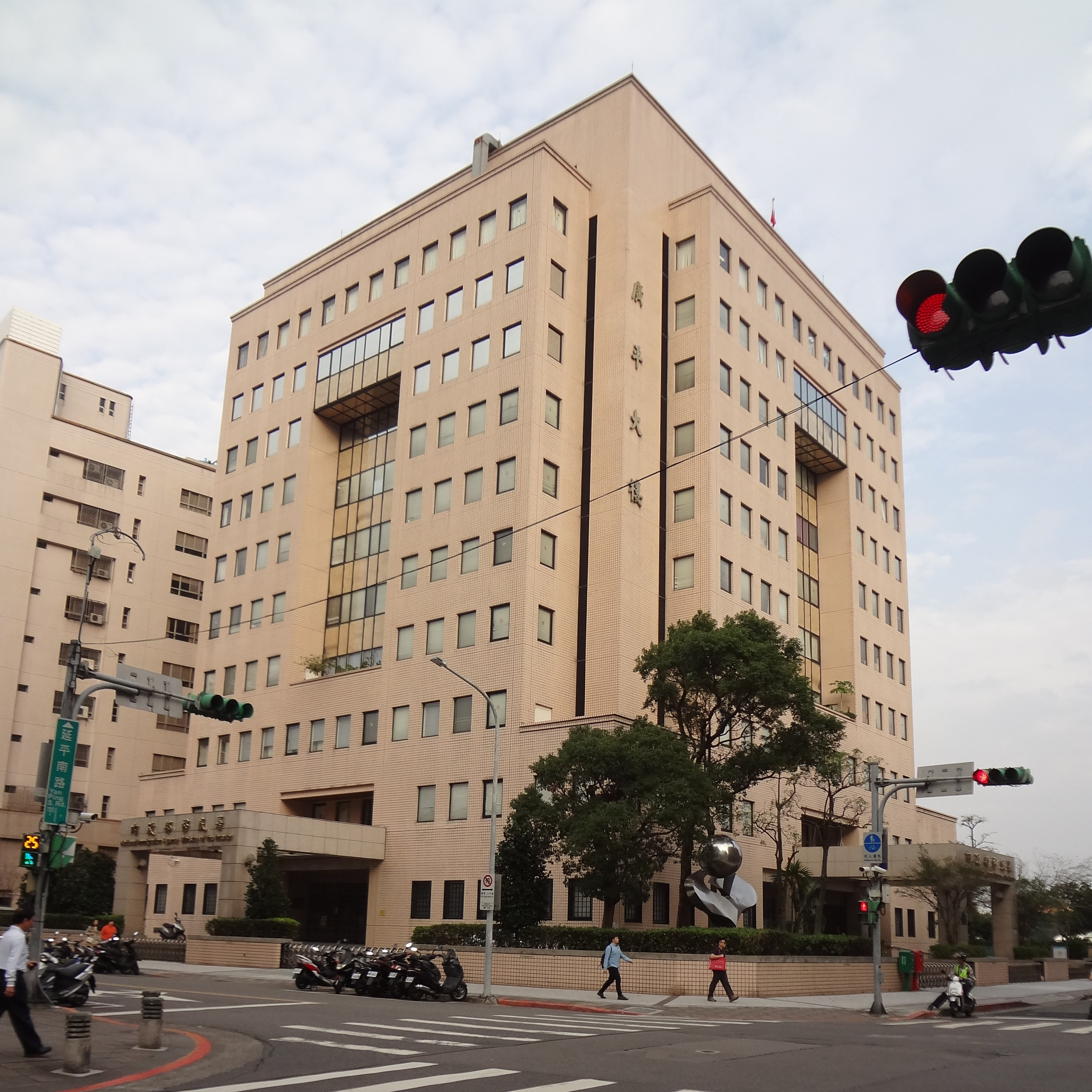
National Immigration Agency building.

The National Immigration Agency is organised in the following structure.

- Entry and Exit Affairs Division
- Immigration Affairs Division
- International Affairs Division
- Immigration Information Division
- Secretariat
- Personnel Office
- Accounting Office
- Civil Service Ethics Office

=== Immigration and Border Enforcement ===
- Service Affairs Corps
- Detention Affairs Corps
- Specialized Operations Corps
- Border Affairs Corps

== Transportation ==
The NIA building is accessible within walking distance West from Xiaonanmen MRT station of the Taipei Metro.

== See also ==
- Ministry of the Interior (Taiwan)
- Executive Yuan
- Resident Certificate
- Exit & Entry Permit (Taiwan)
- Visa policy of Taiwan
- Household registration
- Taiwan passport
- Alien Resident Certificate
- National Identification Card (Republic of China)
- Human trafficking in Taiwan
