= Chiu Feng-kuang =

Taiwanese police officer

Chiu Feng-kuang (Chinese: 邱豐光; born 1955) is a Taiwanese police officer also known by the English name Frank Chiu.

== Personal life and education ==
Chiu Feng-kuang was born in 1955. He is also known by the English name Frank Chiu. Chiu graduated from Central Police University in 1978 and earned a master's degree in criminology from National Taipei University. His uncle Chiou Lien-hui, and another relative, Chiu Yi-ying, have both served on the Legislative Yuan. Chiu Feng-kuang is married to Chang Fang-chen.

== Career ==
Chiu was known for his work alongside Hou You-yi and aided the resolution of the Alexander family hostage crisis in November 1997. Chiu's first administrative leadership position in the police force was as Taipei City Police Department, Wanhua Precinct Investigation Section leader. He has also served as Hsinchu City police chief and headed the Criminal Investigation Bureau's (CIB) Sixth Division. Throughout the 1990s and 2000s, Chiu was affiliated with the Taipei Municipal Police Department's Criminal Investigation Corps, and later became the division's commanding officer through 2003. By 2004, Chiu had been appointed the secretary-general of the Criminal Investigation Bureau. He rose to second-in-command at the CIB, and vacated the position for assignment as Taichung police chief in June 2010. Months after taking the job, Chiu announced that the murder of Weng Chi-nan had been solved. By 2012, Chiu was Keelung City Police Department commissioner. By 2015, Chiu had been appointed to the same role at the Taipei City Police Department. Chiu's tenure in Taipei saw the implementation of mobile police stations proposed by mayor Ko Wen-je. Following the theft of more than NT$83 million from automatic telling machines operated by First Commercial Bank, Chiu implemented a High Technology Crime Investigation Unit in December 2016. Chiu was named deputy director of the National Police Agency in September 2017. He succeeded Jeff Yang as director-general of the National Immigration Agency in December 2018.
