= Statistics of the COVID-19 pandemic in India =

Statistics about the COVID-19 pandemic in India

This article contains statistics about the COVID-19 pandemic in India. COVID-19 cases, deaths, recoveries, and other statistics are shown in nationwide and regional maps and graphs.

== Classifying COVID-19 deaths ==
The Indian Council of Medical Research (ICMR) governs classification of a COVID-19 related death in India. ICMR in turn follows WHO guidelines, recording COVID-19 deaths as U07.1 as per International Classification of Diseases. The National Centre for Disease Informatics and Research, ICMR, released a document titled "Guidance for appropriate recording of COVID-19 related deaths in India".

In March 2020, the first two COVID-19 infected people to die in India officially died due to their co-morbidities and not COVID-19. Around India, people dying of their co-morbidities are not be considered as a COVID-19 death, "if a comorbid patient dies then a committee of experts decides the primary and secondary causes of death [...] If that committee identifies the main cause of death as heart attack, then even if the patient was infected, such a death is not counted as being caused by Covid." Testing of dead bodies to COVID-19 is being done according to ICMR guidelines and government orders. On 17 May 2020, the Delhi government changed COVID-19 testing policy by stopping tests of dead bodies.

== National serological surveys ==
India's first national serological (seroprevalence) survey was conducted by ICMR during May–June 2020; 0.73% sero-positivity was observed. The results were published on 10 September 2021 on the website of the Indian Journal of Medical Research. However the survey and subsequent press releases and the final publication saw a number of discrepancies. ICMR also clarified that the observed sero-positivity did not represent the entire population. While ICMR came out with a 49% sero-positivity rate for Ahmedabad, the Ahmedabad Municipal Corporation conducted its own survey and came out with an average sero-positivity of 17.61%. The second serological survey, published in The Lancet, was conducted in August–September 2020; 6.6% sero-positivity was observed, i.e. for every case detected, about 15 went undetected. India's third national serological survey conducted in December 2020 and January 2021 revealed that only 3.5% of the total infections had been "detected" or "recorded". In other words, for every case detected, about 30 went undetected.

== Reconciliation of data ==
Reconciled and backlogged data includes both deaths and number of tests. States and union territories that have reconciled deaths include Tamil Nadu, Bihar, Andhra Pradesh, Uttarakhand, West Bengal, Goa and Delhi. 7.6 million tests have been reconciled. Until 21 July 2021, Maharashtra had reconciled deaths 14 times.

== Maps ==
Total Confirmed cases by state and union territory

Confirmed cases per million population by state and union territory

Active cases by state and union territory

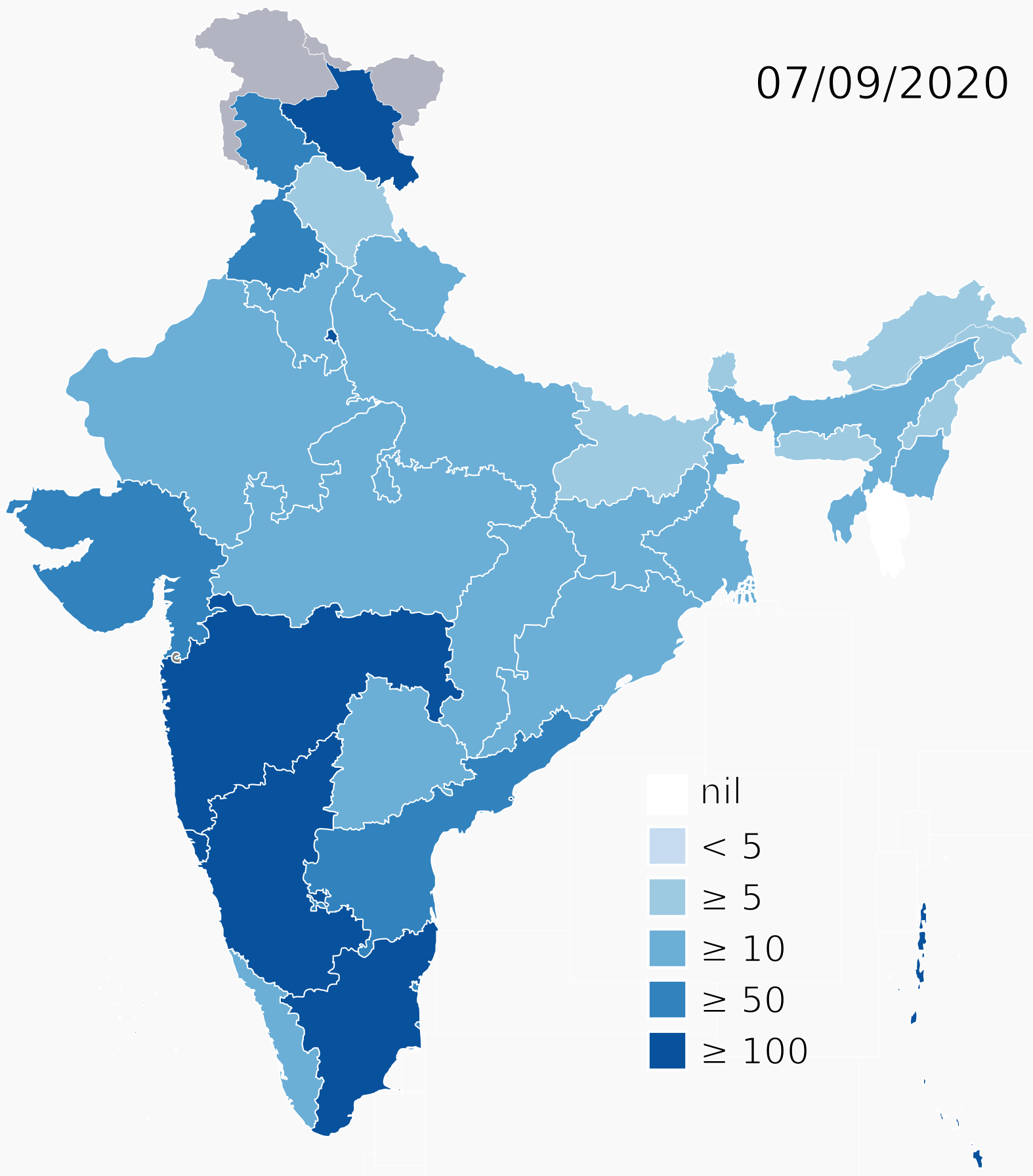
Deaths per million population by state and union territory

Deaths by state and union territory

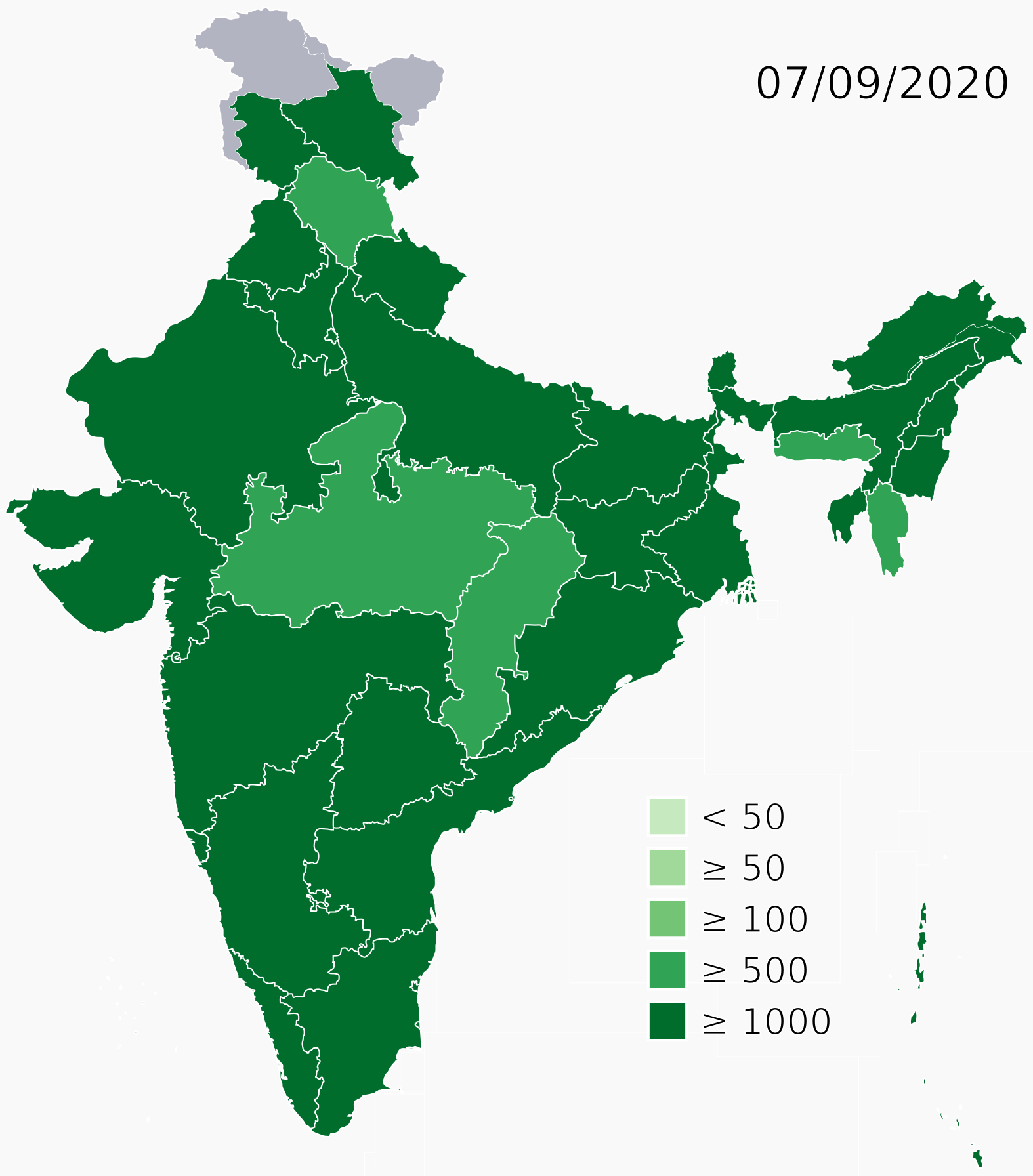
Recoveries per million population by state and union territory

=== Interactive maps ===
Interactive map of confirmed COVID-19 deaths in India.
Click the play button in the top left to interact with the map.
Hover over the regions for values.

Interactive map of confirmed COVID-19 cases in India.
Click the play button in the top left to interact with the map.
Hover over the regions for values.

== Charts ==
=== Daily new cases ===
View source data.

=== Daily new deaths ===
New deaths per day 7-day moving average of new deaths per day

View source data.
Notes:
- On 17 June 2020, 1,672 backlogged deaths from Maharashtra and Delhi were added taking reported daily deaths to 2,003 on that day.
- On 23 July 2020, Tamil Nadu reported 528 deaths including backlogged deaths, taking reported daily deaths to 1,129.
- On 10 June 2021, Bihar added 3,951 backlogged fatalities taking the day's death toll to 6,148 deaths.
- From 1 May to 7 June 2021, Maharashtra added 8,756 backlogged/reconciliation deaths.
- On 21 July 2021, Maharashtra added 3,509 reconciled deaths.

=== Daily new recoveries ===
New recoveries per day

View source data.

=== Daily new cases vs active cases ===
New cases as percentage of active cases 7-day moving average of new cases as percentage of active cases 7-day moving CAGR of active cases

View source data.

=== Confirmed cases by regions ===
>1,000,000
View chart definition.
>100,000 and <1,000,000
View chart definition.
>10,000 and <100,000
View chart definition.

=== Confirmed deaths by regions ===
>10,000
View chart definition.
>1,000 and <10,000
View chart definition.
>100 and <1,000
View chart definition.

=== Case fatality rate ===
The trend of case fatality rate for COVID-19 from 12 March, the day first death in the country was recorded.

View source data.

=== Total samples tested ===
View source data.

=== Daily samples tested ===
View source data.
Notes:
- Between 1 and 5 June 2021, 7.6 million tests were reconciled.

=== Positive sampling rate ===
Daily positive sampling ratio Total positive sampling ratio

=== Plot of new samples tested per day vs new confirmed positive per day ===
View source data.
View source data.

Graph sources: Data from MoHFW and ICMR

== Issues ==
=== Background ===
==== Global mortality excess ====
According to the World Health Organization (WHO), the global mortality excess for COVID-19 is significant, "while 1,813,188 COVID-19 deaths were reported in 2020... WHO estimates suggest an excess mortality of at least 3,000,000." The worldwide average for underreporting COVID-19 deaths in cities is 30%.

==== Legacy issues ====
In India the accuracy of counting its dead is further complicated by its system of tracking deaths in its population in general. In 2018, about 86% of the deaths in the country were registered while medical certificates were given for an estimated 22% of the deaths. Recently released reports by the Civil Registration suggest that death registration has improved further in 2019. Still, there are inaccuracies in the medical certificates. Death registration also varies. In 2019 the National Family Health Survey registration of deaths varied from 37% (Bihar) to 100% (Goa).

=== India's low COVID-19 death count ===
India's low death count has puzzled experts such as microbiologist Gagandeep Kang and epidemiologist Prabhat Jha. Epidemiologist Ramanan Laxminarayan points to India's relatively young population and uneven disease surveillance as reasons for the low death count. Anurag Agrawal, director of the Institute of Genomics and Integrative Biology, points to genetics and air pollution in India as a factor for the low death count.

=== Accuracy ===
In April 2021 the Gujarat High Court and the Telangana High Court both commented on the need of states to provide accurate data with respect to the pandemic. In May 2021, Prime Minister Modi made a comment related to death counts, "states should be encouraged to report their numbers transparently without any pressure of high numbers showing adversely on their efforts".

==== Undercounting ====
Undercounting of cases and deaths during the COVID-19 pandemic in India is not unique to the country. Journalists, mathematicians, epidemiologists, statisticians, and scientists have attempted, according to their expertise, to arrive at a truer number of the actual cases and deaths. The aim of this is to ultimately improve national and international responses to the pandemic. Journalists have spent time at burial-grounds and crematoriums and counted in-person the number of burials and cremations. These manual counts have been compared to government figures and have been found significantly different. India's national serological surveys also point to large numbers (ratios of one is to thirty) of cases remaining undetected. The scale of under-reporting from one place to another can be very large. The undercounting may or may not be intentional. Rather undercounting may occur due to unreported COVID-19 cases, inefficiencies in the data collection system, inability to adapt to pandemic like situation and people not reporting deaths.

- Undercounting of total cases and death figures was reported during the first wave in 2020. The discrepancies were detected by comparing official death counts released by the governments to the number of deaths reported in obituaries, at crematoria and burial grounds, etc. Some states were reported to have not added suspected cases to the final count contrary to WHO guidelines.
- Starting April 2021, reporters of the Gujarati newspaper Sandesh based in seven cities in Gujarat including Ahmedabad and Gandhinagar went to mortuaries, hospitals and cremation sites and recorded what they saw. On 16 April, reporters in Ahmedabad counted over 200 bodies; the next day the governments official count was 25. For a number of days Sandesh reporters did this. The newspaper publishes the findings on a regular basis. The Hindu also pointed to similar discrepancies.
- On 15 April 2021, a report in Dainik Bhaskar's Bhopal edition stated that the official number of COVID-19 deaths in Bhopal during the last 5 days were 21, however cremations had taken place for 356 COVID-19 cases. India Today and The New York Times found similar discrepancies in Bhopal in April.
- On 24 April 2021, data scientist Bhramar Mukherjee said "From all the modeling we’ve done, we believe the true number of deaths is two to five times what is being reported."
- In April 2021, the Observer collected data from Muzaffarnagar, Uttar Pradesh and found large differences in the official count and the numbers given by frontline workers.
- On 18 May 2021 Dainik Bhaskar published a story which was the outcome of a collaborative effort of 30 of its reporters. The story reported at least 2000 bodies along a 1140 km stretch of the River Ganga. On 15 May, Reuters reported that they had accessed an official confirmation that COVID-19 deaths were being dumped in rivers.
- On 13 May 2021, the Institute for Health Metrics and Evaluation placed India's total deaths at 736,811 while the reported number of cases were 248,016.
- On 25 May 2021, The New York Times has estimated a number from double the official figure, to over 1 million. The worst-case scenario according to NYT was 4.2 million deaths; 13.7 times India's official figure in the same time period.
- On 12 June 2021, The Economist reported that Christopher Leffler of Virginia Commonwealth University analyses data on excess mortality from different parts of India, showing a rough estimate of between 1.8 million and 2.4 million total death since the start of the pandemic. Indian polling organization CVoter, which conducted surveys throughout the pandemic, calculated that the likely death toll from COVID-19 by mid-May 2021 was around 1.83 million.
- Based on data from the National Family Health Survey, a research paper in Science Advances showed that even in the year 2020, deaths were undercounted by about eight times. Marginalized groups were more likely to have been affected.

==== Overcounting ====
Following reports of under-counting in May 2021, ThePrint published figures that the Delhi government may have started over-counting. Irrespective of either, the accuracy of government figures, irrespective of high or low counts, is brought to question.
