= Dcard =

Social network company in Taiwan

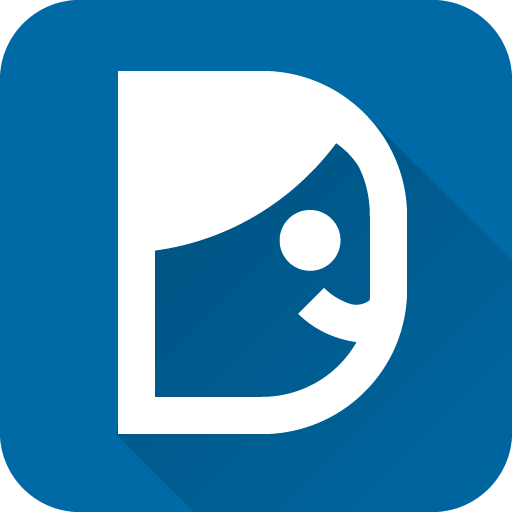
- Website type: Social Networking Service
- Available in: Traditional Chinese, Japanese
- Headquarters: Taiwan
- Owner: DCARD TAIWAN LTD.
- CEO: Kytu Lin
- Website: www.dcard.tw
- Commercial: Yes
- Registration: Required
- Launched: December 16, 2011; 14 years ago
- Current status: Active

Dcard is an online social media and networking platform based in Taiwan. The platform was first created by Kytu Lin, then-sophomore at National Taiwan University, and other students in 2011 in its web version. Initially positioned as a networking service dedicated for college students, users of the service are presented with a ‘Friend of the Day’ profile card every midnight, which gave inspiration to the name ‘Dcard’ where the initial D is an abbreviation of ‘Destiny’.

The service rapidly gained popularity across local universities, soon leading the founding team to roll out discussion-driven community forum services in 2012. In October 2015, Dcard Taiwan Ltd. was officially established with its headquarters based in Taipei, Taiwan.

As of November 2022, Dcard claims to be the most influential social media platform among young Taiwanese with over 6 million members and is frequented by more than 18 million unique visitors each month. Since 2018, the company has been expanding its services to new markets worldwide including Hong Kong, Macau and Japan under the name ‘Dtto’.

In 2021, Dcard starts allowing registration with mobile numbers. In February 2022, Dcard launched a real-name verification system.

== Features ==
=== Community forums ===
Being a discussion-based community website, Dcard's content mainly consists user generated articles, categorized into sub-forums under a multitude of topics. The sub-forums are operated by voluntary moderators who are often active users themselves.

=== E-commerce ===
In 2019, Dcard introduced to its website ‘Good Choice Taiwan’, an e-commerce platform based on authentic consumer reviews with the listed products curated from items that are actively discussed on the forums.

=== Video production ===
‘Dcard Video’ is the official YouTube channel run by Dcard's video creation team. Leveraging interactive formats such as talk shows and street interviews, Dcard Videos' content draws inspiration from trending topics on the forums and occasionally features other celebrities and influencers to join the discussion. As of November 2022, the channel has over 900k followers

=== Featured characters ===
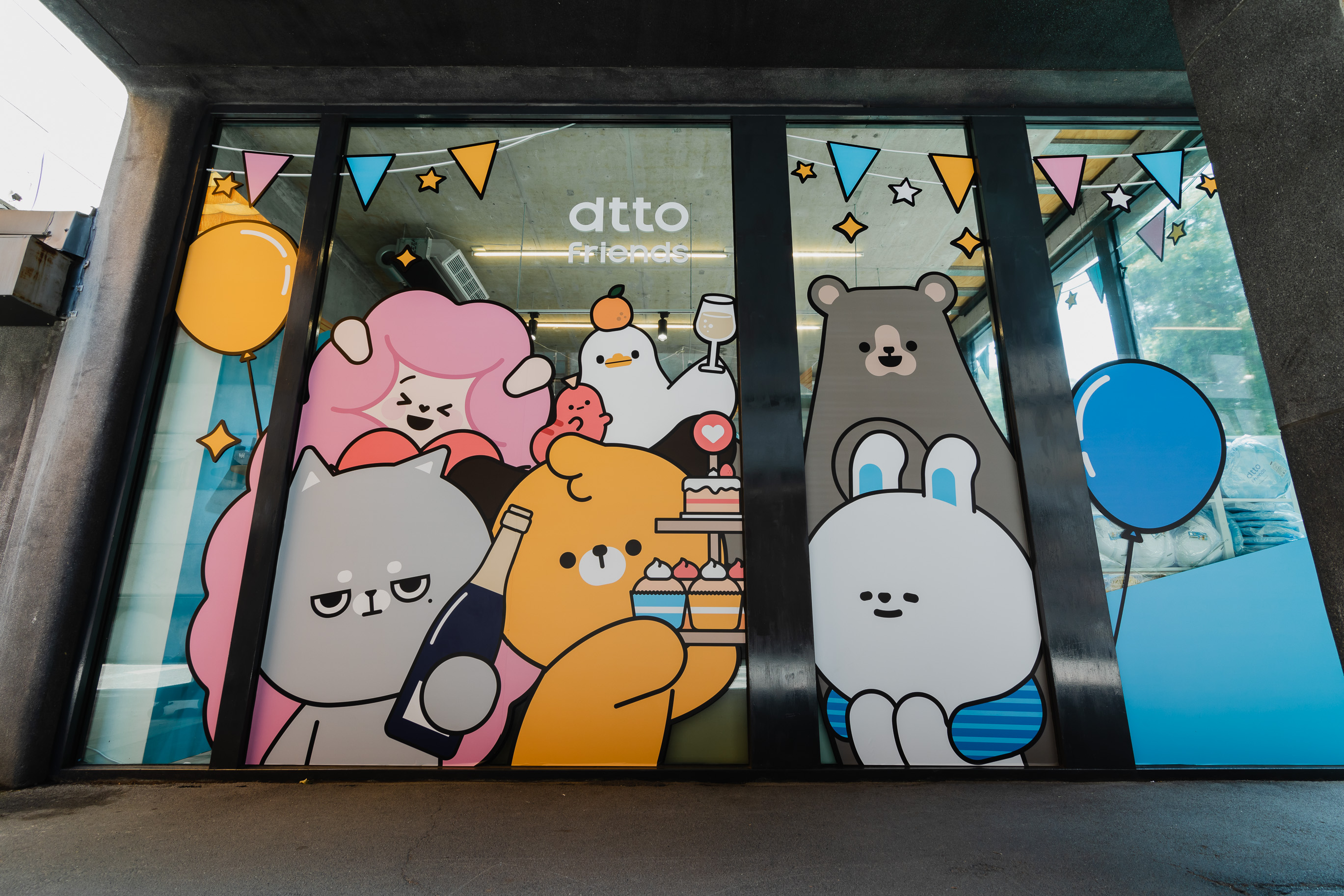
Exterior of the dtto friends pop-up store in held Huashan 1914 Creative Park in 2022

‘dtto friends’ are a group of featured characters created by Dcard. The characters were first introduced as emoji stickers on the forums, followed by comic-style illustrations and short videos on various social media platforms. In 2022, a dtto friends pop-up store event was hosted in Taipei.
