= Lin Yu-ju (criminal) =

Taiwanese serial killer

- Born: 1981 (age 44–45); Tainan, Taiwan
- Other names: "The Nantou Poisoning Wife" "The Puli Poisoning Wife"
- Status: Incarcerated; awaiting execution
- Conviction: Murder x3
- Penalty: Death

Details
- Victims: 3
- Span of crimes: 2008–2009
- Country: Taiwan
- State: Nantou
- Date apprehended: 2009
- Imprisoned at: Taichung Women's Prison

Lin Yu-ju (Chinese: 林于如, born 1981) is a Taiwanese serial killer responsible for the Nantou Serial Murders between 2008 and 2009. As part of an insurance scam to get rid of her gambling debts, Lin murdered her mother in her Tainan home and poisoned her mother-in-law and husband in Puli. On June 14, 2013, the Supreme Court sentenced her to death, making Lin the fourth overall female death row prisoner in Taiwan. As of 2025, she is the country's only female death row inmate and remains imprisoned in the Taichung Women's Prison, awaiting execution. Due to the cruelty of her crimes, which shocked the Taiwanese population, she was nicknamed The Nantou Poisoning Wife and The Puli Poisoning Wife.

== Case history ==
A Tainan native born in 1981, Lin worked at a former vocational school-turned-cabaret club, as did her sister. Lin became addicted to gambling at Mark Six lotteries, struggling to make ends meet. She met Liu Yu-hang, a national badminton player, at the cabaret club, and terminated two pregnancies before choosing to carry their third pregnancy to term and marry him. The family operated a small but honest stinky tofu stand in Puli. Lin and Liu continued to accumulate large gambling debts playing the Mark Six lottery. Since she could not pay off her debts, Liu devised a plan to defraud insurance money through murder.

On August 16, 2008, under the threat of suspending the operations of the stinky tofu stand because of her unstable income, Lin burned the establishment down during the night by dousing it with kerosene and igniting it.

On November 10, while visiting her family in Tainan, Lin pushed her mother Hou Yueh-yun down the stairs. Hou suffered a serious head injury and died, which resulted in Lin receiving $5 million NT in insurance claims.

In May 2009, Lin searched on the internet for a way to poison her mother-in-law, Cheng Hui-shen. She first administered it into Cheng's food, after which the woman was driven to the hospital. There, Lin tampered with the IV drip by mixing it with antidepressants, ethanol, and methanol. The concoction successfully killed her victim.

Between June and July, Lin tried to kill her ex-husband in the same way. She first poisoned his food, which caused Liu to be admitted to the hospital. However, when she tried to put the poison in the IV drip, she was discovered by a nurse. After the nurse stopped her, she inquired Lin as to her reasoning. Lin argued that she had just felt that the drip wasn't smooth enough and wanted to pass the bottle. However, the nurses were alert and took special care of Liu, discarding the poisoned "drip bottle". Although Liu survived the first time, he was re-admitted soon after because of suspected acute gastroenteritis. Lin deliberately chose a single ward this time to prevent interference from the nurses and successfully managed to kill her ex-husband.

The insurance company's claimants noted that Lin's relatives all died in a strangely consecutive manner, so they reported their suspicions to the police. The investigators discovered that Lin had also insured her aunt and son, whom she likely had intended to kill as well. In addition, the poisoned drip bottle retained by the nurses was regarded as additional proof for the crimes.

At her trial, Lin's lawyer argued that, compared to the average 106 IQ in Taiwan, Lin's one of 57, coupled with her depression, should be considered an intellectual disability and thus, prevent the issue of the death penalty. But the presiding judge rebuked this, pointing out that she had a vocational education, had signed a long-term bet with the lottery, had set up a plan, and carried out the killings of her relatives in a calculated manner. Because of this, the death sentence was retained.

Members of the Taiwan Alliance to End the Death Penalty have advocated against capital punishment on Lin's behalf, citing mental impairment and attributing her medication addiction to frequent physical harm due to domestic violence.

== Prosecution and trial ==
- In April 2010, the Nantou District Prosecutors' Office sought three death sentences against Lin Yu-ju.
- On May 20, 2011, the Nantou District Court sentenced Lin to death for the murder of her husband and two terms of life imprisonment for the murder of her mother and mother-in-law. In February 2012, when an appeal was filed to the second instance, the Taichung High Court commuted the sentence to life imprisonment.
- Upon a retrial, the sentence was reverted to the death penalty, and was ultimately confirmed by the Supreme Court on June 14, 2013.

== See also ==
- List of serial killers by country
