= Visa requirements for Chinese citizens =

Administrative entry restrictions

An ordinary Chinese passport

Visa requirements for Chinese citizens are administrative entry restrictions imposed on citizens of China who hold Mainland passport by the authorities of other states.

As of 2026, Chinese citizens had visa-free or visa on arrival access to 83 countries and territories, ranking the Chinese Passport 55th in the world according to the Henley Passport Index.

== Historical perspective ==
Before February 2014, Chinese immigration authorities did not generally allow mainland Chinese citizens to board cruise ships, flights, or go through land border crossings to other countries without holding a valid visa for the destination country, unless the destination country had a bilateral visa waiver agreement with China.

Exceptions were possible if the traveller had a third country's visa and a connecting flight from the initial destination country to the third country. As of 10 June 2017, if the destination is a visa-on-arrival or e-visa issuing country this approval is no longer needed.

Visa requirements for Chinese citizens were lifted by:

Country	Date	Note
Federated States of Micronesia	18 December 1980	
San Marino	22 July 1985	Symbolic, as one can only enter the country from Italy which is subject to visa policy of the Schengen Area.
Seychelles	26 June 2013	
Bahamas	12 February 2014	
Jamaica	26 February 2014	
Antigua and Barbuda	18 November 2014	
Indonesia	2015	Visa Requirement Later Reinstated
Fiji	14 March 2015	
Grenada	10 June 2015	
Ecuador	1 March 2016	Visa Requirement Reinstated on 1 July 2024
Morocco	1 June 2016	
Tonga	19 August 2016	
Saint Kitts and Nevis	1 January 2017	
Serbia	15 January 2017	
Tunisia	17 February 2017	
Barbados	1 June 2017	
United Arab Emirates	16 January 2018	
Bosnia and Herzegovina	29 May 2018	
British Virgin Islands	5 July 2018	
Saint Lucia	18 July 2018	
Belarus	10 August 2018	
Qatar	21 December 2018	
Iran	21 July 2019	
Albania	23 December 2019	
Uzbekistan	1 January 2020	
Armenia	19 January 2020	
Oman	16 December 2020	
Suriname	1 May 2021	
Maldives	20 May 2022	
Kazakhstan	8 July 2022	
Dominica	19 September 2022	
Zambia	2 November 2022	
Gabon	20 February 2023	Visa Requirement Later Reinstated
Mozambique	1 May 2023	
Kiribati	1 September 2023	
Benin	3 September 2023	
Georgia	11 September 2023	
Thailand	25 September 2023	Permanently on 1 March 2024
Angola	28 September 2023	
Malaysia	1 December 2023	Permanently on 17 July 2025
Kenya	4 January 2024	Must apply for eTA (fee required)
Singapore	9 February 2024	
Malawi	9 February 2024	Visa requirement later reinstated
Cuba	5 May 2024	
Azerbaijan	20 July 2024	Permanently on 16 July 2025
Solomon Islands	28 December 2024	
Brunei	8 March 2025	
Samoa	2 April 2025	
Russia	1 December 2025	Temporary visa free regime
Turkey	2 January 2026	
Philippines	16 January 2026	Temporary visa free regime
Brazil	11 May 2026	Temporary visa free regime
Cambodia	15 June 2026	Visa Requirement Later Reinstated
Senegal	Nov 2026	

Visas on arrival were introduced by:

Country	Date	Note
Azerbaijan	1 February 2016	Also visa-exempt
Brunei	23 May 2016	Also visa-exempt
Ukraine	1 October 2016	Currently abolished. Must apply for e-visa.
Armenia	10 November 2016	Also visa-exempt
São Tomé and Príncipe	5 April 2017	
Qatar	22 June 2017	Also visa-exempt
Gabon	12 October 2017	Converted to e-Visa
Bolivia	27 December 2017	
Rwanda	1 January 2018	
Benin	15 March 2018	Also visa-exempt
Zimbabwe	1 July 2018	
Myanmar	1 October 2018	for air arrivals only
Sierra Leone	5 July 2019	
Saudi Arabia	28 September 2019	
Iraq	15 March 2021	
Sudan	1 July 2026	

Chinese citizens were made eligible for eVisas by:

Country	Date	Note
Lesotho	1 May 2017	
Djibouti	18 February 2018	
Oman	7 May 2018	Also visa-exempt
Uzbekistan	15 July 2018	Also visa-exempt
Pakistan	14 March 2019	14 August 2024: Visa Prior to Arrival (No visa fee)
Saudi Arabia	28 September 2019	
Botswana	12 August 2021	
South Africa	14 February 2022	ETA since October 2025
Mongolia	27 April 2022	
Sierra Leone	15 March 2023	
Japan	19 June 2023	Electronic visa (outside mainland China): Chinese nationals living in certain countries can apply for an electronic visa valid for a single visit within three months and for a stay of 15 days
Russia	1 August 2023	Also visa-exempt
Vietnam	15 August 2023	
Philippines	15 August 2023	(resumed since 3 November 2025) Also visa-exempt from 16 Jan 2026
Libya	21 March 2024	
Trinidad and Tobago	26 April 2024	
Sri Lanka	26 September 2024	ETA
Nicaragua	March 2026	
Afghanistan	March 2026	Chinese nationals living outside the restricted countries and regions (mainland China, India, Russia, UAE, Saudi Arabia, Turkey, Qatar, Oman, Malaysia, Indonesia, Kyrgyzstan, and Azerbaijan) can apply for an e-Visa
Ghana	25 May 2026	

== Visa requirements map ==
Visa requirements map for Chinese citizens with an ordinary Chinese passport Mainland China May enter with Entry–Exit Permit for Hong Kong SAR or Macau SAR Visa not required Visa on arrival eVisa Visa available both on arrival or online Visa required in advance Tourism admission restricted

== Visa requirements ==
Country / Region	Visa requirement	Allowed stay	Notes (excluding departure fees)	Reciprocity
Afghanistan	eVisa	30 days	The eVisa is valid for a single entry of up to 30 days and can only be used when arriving at Kabul Airport.; An introducing letter (from employer/organization/university/etc.) is required.	No
Albania	Visa not required	90 days	90 days within any 180 day period.	Yes
Algeria	Visa required			Yes
Andorra	Visa not required		Although officially no visa is required, at least a Double Entry Schengen visa is required to enter Andorra since it has no own airport facility.	Yes
Angola	Visa not required	30 days	30 days per trip, but no more than 90 days within any 1 calendar year for tourism purposes only.; Visitors must have a return/onward ticket and a hotel reservation confirmation.; An International Certificate of Vaccination is required.	No
Antigua and Barbuda	Visa not required	30 days	The duration of stay is 30 days at a time, no more than 90 days within any 180 days.	Yes
Argentina	Visa required		Electronic Travel Authorization (AVE) will only be issued to those who already possess a U.S. or Schengen visa. It must be approved before travel and is valid for tourism purposes.; As of 1 October 2017, visas are issued with a 10-year validity period.; As of 22 July 2025, visa not required for holders of a valid United States visa for up to 30-day stay and may be extended once for another 30-day.	No
Armenia	Visa not required	90 days	90 days within any 180 day period.; Holders of passports for public affairs do not require a visa for up to 30 days.	Yes
Australia	Online Visa required		May apply online (Online Visitor e600 visa and Online e400 work visa).; Visas are issued for 1,3,5 or 10-year validity period for Chinese citizens and a 10-year visa required for additional bio-data enrollment at the visa application centres out of mainland China due to the visa application centres not established in mainland China.; Chinese biometric passport holders use automated passport control SmartGate on arrival to Australia.	No
Austria	Visa required			No
Azerbaijan	Visa not required	30 days	The duration of stay is 30 days at a time, no more than 90 days within any 180 days.	Yes
Bahamas	Visa not required	3 months		Yes
Bahrain	eVisa / Visa on arrival	14 days	Holders of passports for public affairs do not require a visa.	Yes
Bangladesh	Visa on arrival	30 days	Holders of passports for public affairs do not require a visa.	No
Barbados	Visa not required	30 days		Yes
Belarus	Visa not required	30 days	Visa free for 30 days, for a maximum total stay of 90 days within any 1 calendar year.; Holders of passports for public affairs do not require a visa for up to 30 days.	Yes
Belgium	Visa required			No
Belize	Visa required		Visa is not required for cruise passengers.; Holders of a multi-entry visa or Permanent Resident Card issued by Canada or United States, may enter visa-free for up to 30 days.; Holders of a multi-entry visa issued by a Schengen state, may enter visa-free for up to 30 days.	Yes
Benin	Visa not required	30 days		No
Bhutan	eVisa			No
Bolivia	Visa required		Visitors must complete an online application form, but still need to visit an embassy in order to receive a sticker visa.; Holders of passports for public affairs do not require a visa.	Yes
Bosnia and Herzegovina	Visa not required	90 days	90 days within any 180 day period.	Yes
Botswana	eVisa	3 months	Holders of passports for public affairs do not require a visa.	No
Brazil	Visa not required	30 days	Visa-exemption up to 30 days in 12 months until 31 Dec 2026.; As of 19 February 2024, visas are issued with a 10-year validity period for holidays, business and family visit purposes.	Yes
Brunei	Visa not required	14 days		Yes
Bulgaria	Visa required			No
Burkina Faso	eVisa		Holders of passports for public affairs do not require a visa.	No
Burundi	Online Visa / Visa on arrival	1 month		No
Cambodia	Online Visa / Visa on arrival	30 days	Visas valid for 30 days can be obtained on arrival or online.	No
Cameroon	eVisa			No
Canada	Visa required		No transit visa is required if transiting through Calgary, Montreal Trudeau (Air Canada Flights only), Toronto Pearson (Terminal 1 only, cannot change terminal or transit through Terminal 3), Vancouver International or Winnipeg Airports to or from the United States within 24 hours of arrival while holding valid US visa and travelling on flights operated by Air Canada (including subsidiaries Air Canada Rouge and Jazz Air), Air China, Cathay Pacific, China Airlines, China Eastern Airlines, China Southern Airlines, Hainan Airlines, Philippine Airlines, WestJet, or Xiamen Airlines. Need to departure from Beijing, Chengdu, Fuzhou, Guangzhou, Harbin, Hong Kong, Manila, Nagoya, Osaka, Seoul, Shanghai, Shenyang, Taipei, Tokyo, or Xiamen if travelling to the United States. Need not to be under a removal or deportation order or staying in the United States longer than the authorized time if leaving the United States.; Visa is not required for permanent residents of the United States.	No
Cape Verde	Visa on arrival	30 days		No
Central African Republic	Visa required			Yes
Chad	eVisa			No
Chile	Visa required		National visa may be substituted with a visa issued by Canada or the United States which is valid for a minimum of 6 months from the arrival date, or PR Card (green card).	No
Colombia	Online Visa		National visa may be substituted with a visa or residence permit issued by a Schengen Area member state or the United States which is valid for a minimum of 180 days from the arrival date.	No
Comoros	Visa on arrival	45 days	Holders of passports for public affairs do not require a visa.	No
Republic of the Congo	Visa required		Holders of passports for public affairs do not require a visa.	Yes
Democratic Republic of the Congo	eVisa	7 days		No
Costa Rica	Visa required		Holders of passports for public affairs do not require a visa for stays up to 30 days.; National visa may be substituted with a visa issued by Canada or the United States.	Yes
Côte d'Ivoire	eVisa	3 months	e-Visa holders must arrive via Port Bouet Airport; Holders of passports for public affairs do not require a visa.	No
Croatia	Visa required			No
Cuba	Visa not required	90 days		No
Cyprus	Visa required		Holders of valid double or multiple entry Schengen visa, as well as residence permits issued by Schengen Member States are not required to hold a short-stay visa to enter the Republic of Cyprus for a time period that does not exceed 90 days in any 180 day period.	No
Czech Republic	Visa required			Yes
Denmark	Visa required			No
Djibouti	eVisa	90 days	Holders of passports for public affairs do not require a visa.	No
Dominica	Visa not required	30 days		Yes
Dominican Republic	Visa required		Holders of a visa or permanent residency card issued by Canada, United States, United Kingdom, Ireland, Cyprus and any Schengen Area country can enter visa-free for a maximum stay of 30 days. United Kingdom residents can obtain a Tourist Card on arrival for a maximum stay of 90 days.	Yes
Ecuador	eVisa		Effective from 1 July 2024, Ecuador reinstates visa requirements for Chinese citizens.	Yes
Egypt	eVisa / Visa on arrival	30 days	Chinese citizens are eligible to apply for e-Visa.; Per IATA, Chinese citizens are eligible to apply for visa on arrival for a maximum stay of one month with a Letter of Guarantee from a local travel agency.	No
El Salvador	Visa required			Yes
Equatorial Guinea	eVisa			No
Eritrea	Visa required		Holders of passports for public affairs do not require a visa.	Yes
Estonia	Visa required			No
Eswatini	Visa required			Yes
Ethiopia	eVisa / Visa on arrival	90 days	Visa on arrival is obtainable only at Addis Ababa Bole International Airport.; e-Visa holders must arrive via Addis Ababa Bole International Airport.; e-Visa is available for 30 or 90 days.; Visa free for holders of passports for public affairs.	No
Fiji	Visa not required	4 months		Yes
Finland	Visa required			No
France	Visa required			No
Gabon	eVisa	90 days	e-Visa holders must arrive via Libreville International Airport.; Holders of passports for public affairs do not require a visa.	No
Gambia	Visa required		Holders of passports for public affairs do not require a visa.	Yes
Georgia	Visa not required	30 days	Holders of valid visas or residence permits of EU/EFTA/GCC countries, overseas territories of EU countries (except Anguilla, Montserrat, Pitcairn, Saint Helena, Ascension and Tristan da Cunha), Australia, Canada, Israel, Japan, New Zealand, South Korea, United Kingdom, or the United States - visa-free for stays of maximum 90 days in a 180-day period. Otherwise, the default 30-day period applies.	Yes
Germany	Visa required			No
Ghana	eVisa			Yes
Greece	Visa required			No
Grenada	Visa not required	30 days		Yes
Guatemala	Visa required		Travellers who hold an El Salvador, Honduras, or Nicaragua visa or residency permit can enter Guatemala without a visa under the Central America-4 Border Control Agreement.; Since 2019, permanent residents of any European Union member state, Andorra, Antigua and Barbuda, Argentina, Australia, Bahamas, Bahrain, Barbados, Belize, Brazil, Brunei, Canada, Chile, Colombia, Costa Rica, Fiji, Honduras, Iceland, Israel, Japan, Kuwait, Liechtenstein, Madagascar, Malaysia, Marshall Islands, Mexico, Monaco, New Zealand, North Macedonia, Norway, Panama, Paraguay, Peru, Qatar, Russia, Saint Kitts and Nevis, Saint Lucia, Saint Vincent and the Grenadines, San Marino, São Tomé and Príncipe, Saudi Arabia, Singapore, Solomon Islands, South Africa, South Korea, Switzerland, Taiwan, Trinidad and Tobago, Turkey, Tuvalu, Ukraine, United Arab Emirates, United Kingdom, United States, Uruguay, Vanuatu, and Vatican City, can enter Guatemala without a visa, regardless of nationality.	Yes
Guinea	eVisa	90 days	Holders of passports for public affairs do not require a visa.	No
Guinea-Bissau	Visa on arrival	90 days		No
Guyana	eVisa		Holders of passports for public affairs do not require a visa.; According to Timatic, all other visitors that are not visa exempt can obtain an eVisa before departure.	Yes
Haiti	Visa not required	3 months	All non-Haitian passport holders must pay a tourist fee of 10 USD on arrival.	No
Honduras	Visa required		National visa may be substituted with a valid visa issued by Canada, the United States, or a Schengen Area member state, or a residence permit of the United Kingdom, Japan, Singapore, Australia and New Zealand.	Yes
Hungary	Visa required			No
Iceland	Visa required			Yes
India	Visa required		e-Visa is no longer available due to military tension between China and India.	Yes
Indonesia	e-VOA / Visa on arrival	30 days		No
Iran	Visa not required	21 days		No
Iraq	eVisa	30 days	Effective 1 March 2025, citizens of the countries that used have a visa on arrival facility are advised to apply for an e-visa before traveling to Iraq via the link.	No
Ireland	Visa required		National visa may be substituted with a valid C visa (until December 2026) or visas endorsed with BIVS issued by the United Kingdom. Entry is permitted only if a first point of entry to the Common Travel Area was in the UK.	No
Israel	Visa required		As of 2017 visas are issued with a 10-year validity period.	Yes
Italy	Visa required			No
Jamaica	Visa not required	30 days		No
Japan	eVisa (conditional)		Japanese oversea missions in mainland China request all visa applications guaranteed and submitted by authorized travel agencies and do not accept direct submission. See details.; Passengers transiting through Narita or Haneda airport may apply for a shore pass to enter Japan for no more than 72 hours without a visa, subject to the discretion of immigration authorities and certain conditions.; Passengers of approved cruise ships do not require a visa if they stay no longer than 15 days.; e-Visa is available if residing in Brazil, Cambodia, Canada, Saudi Arabia, Singapore, South Africa, Taiwan, United Arab Emirates, the United Kingdom and the United States. It is a single entry visa for tourism purpose only with a duration of 15, 30 or 90 days depending on the traveller's itinerary.; e-Visa is available if residing in Mongolia. It is a single entry visa for tourism purpose only with a duration of 15, 30 or 90 days depending on the traveller's itinerary. e-Visa application must be made through the travel agencies accredited by the Japanese overseas establishment from 15 December 2023.; e-Visa is also available for Chinese passport holder who resides in Mainland China (except Hong Kong and Macau) only, it is a single entry visa and its duration of stay is 15 or 30 days. e-Visa application must be made through the travel agencies accredited by the Japanese overseas establishment from 19 June 2023. The electronic visa will be issued when the agencies are ready to apply through JAPAN e-Visa.; For Chinese citizens residing in other territories, a vignette style visa is required. Multi-entry vignette style visas are also obtainable in all territories for 3 or 5 year validity.	No
Jordan	eVisa / Visa on arrival		Visa can be obtained upon arrival, it will cost a total of 40 JOD, obtainable at most international ports of entry and land border crossings. (except King Hussein/Allenby Bridge)	No
Kazakhstan	Visa not required	30 days	90 days within any 180-day period.	Yes
Kenya	Electronic Travel Authorisation	90 days	Applications can be submitted up to 90 days prior to travel and must be submitted at least 3 days in advance.; eTA fee is 32.50 USD.; Proof of reservation at the hotel where visitors plan to stay is required (if staying with friends, an invitation letter is also acceptable).; Yellow fever vaccination certificate is required if coming from endemic countries.	No
Kiribati	Visa not required	90 days	90 days within any 12-month period.	No
North Korea	Visa required		Chinese tourists may visit Tongnim County without a visa for 2 days. They may also visit Sinuiju for a day trip without a visa.; Holders of passports for public affairs do not require a visa.	Yes
South Korea	Online Visa required		Visa not required for direct or transit visitors to Jeju Island up to 30 days.; Visa not required for 30 days as a transit tourist (category B-2) to or from the United States, Canada, Australia, New Zealand, the United Kingdom, Ireland, Cyprus and 29 (European Union) Schengen member states. They must hold an onward ticket and a physical visa sticker affixed to the passport (except for Australia and the United Kingdom where VEVO and eVisa services are accepted). Residence cards are not accepted. Any layovers between South Korea and the above state must not (1) be in China (including Hong Kong and Macau); (2) exceed 3 days.; Chinese group tourists departing from China (including Hong Kong and Macau) to Incheon, Gimpo, Gimhae, Cheongju, Muan, Daegu, and Yangyang International Airport in South Korea, travel within 5 days (10 days at Yangyang Airport) and then transfer to domestic flights in Korea Flight to Jeju Island.; Chinese group tourists departing from China via South Korea to Japan with a Japanese group tourist visa, and Chinese group tourists departing from Japan via South Korea to China or a third country.; From 29 September 2025 to 30 June 2026, Chinese tourists traveling in groups more than 3 people who have registered with designated travel agencies do not need a visa to visit South Korea for up to 15 days.	Yes
Kuwait	Visa required		Kuwait government only issues the travel visas to the ordinary passport holders of Chinese citizens with valid UK, US, or Schengen Visas or Chinese citizens with GCC country residencies.	No
Kyrgyzstan	Visa not required (conditional) / eVisa	21 days / 60 days	Groups of 5 to 25 tourists can enter Kyrgyzstan without a visa for up to 21 days through pre-approved travel agencies.; e-Visa holders must arrive via Manas International Airport or Osh Airport or through land crossings with China (at Irkeshtam and Torugart), Kazakhstan (at Ak-jol, Ak-Tilek, Chaldybar, Chon-Kapka), Tajikistan (at Bor-Dobo, Kulundu, Kyzyl-Bel) and Uzbekistan (at Dostuk).; Citizens of China arriving through the checkpoint at Manas International Airport can stay visa-free for up to 7 days if they have a voucher (which can be purchased upon arrival at Manas International Airport) with a value of at least US$500 and a return air ticket to their country of citizenship or to a third country with the right to re-enter visa-free after 21 days from the date of departure; or with long-term visas (for a period of more than 3 years) of the United States of America, the Kingdom of Great Britain and Northern Ireland, the Schengen zone, where they can stay visa-free for 7 days with the right to re-enter visa-free after 21 days from the date of departure.	No
Laos	eVisa / Visa on arrival	30 days	From 1 July to 31 December, a group of 5 tourists accompanied by a travel agency can enter Laos without a visa for 15 days by arranging their itinerary through a registered travel agency in Laos and applying for visa exemption in advance.; 18 (Note: Savannakhet Airport; Lanetoui - Mengkang (China); Meuangmom - Wan Pong (Myanmar); Banvang - Ban Khok Phai (Thailand); Namngeun - Huay Kon (Thailand); Paksan - Bueng Kan (Thailand); Paktaphan - Pak Saeng (Thailand); Pangmon - Ban Huak (Thailand); Phoudou (Thailand); Dak ta ock - Nam Giang (Vietnam); La Lai (Vietnam); Namkan (Vietnam); Namphao - Cau Treo (Vietnam); Namsoy - Na Meo (Vietnam); Naphao - Cha Lo (Vietnam); Pahang - Long Sap (Vietnam); Panghok - Tây Trang (Vietnam); Phoukeua - Bo Y (Vietnam)) of the 33 border crossings are only open to regular visa holders.; e-Visa may be used to enter Laos through the Luang Prabang, Pakse and Vientiane international airports, 3 Thai-Lao Friendship Bridges (Note: Vientiane (Friendship Bridge 1); Savannakhet (Friendship Bridge 2); Bokeo (Friendship Bridge 4)), in Boten (road and railroad), and in Vientiane (at Khamsavath railway station).; Visa on arrival is available at the Luang Prabang, Pakse and Vientiane international airports, 4 Thai-Lao Friendship Bridges (Note: Vientiane (Friendship Bridge 1); Savannakhet (Friendship Bridge 2); Khammouane (Friendship Bridge 3); Bokeo (Friendship Bridge 4)) and 7 border crossings. (Note: Nongnokkheane - Trapeang Kriel (Cambodia); Boten - Bo han (China); Golden Triangle/Samliemkham (Thailand); Khamsavath railway station (Thailand); Namheuang - Ban Na Kraseng (Thailand); Vang tao - Chongmek (Thailand); Dansavan - Lao Bảo (Vietnam)); Holders of passports for public affairs do not require a visa.	No
Latvia	Visa required			No
Lebanon	Free visa on arrival	1 month	Extendable for 2 additional months.	No
Lesotho	eVisa			No
Liberia	Visa required			Yes
Libya	eVisa			No
Liechtenstein	Visa required			No
Lithuania	Visa required			Yes
Luxembourg	Visa required			No
Madagascar	Online Visa / Visa on arrival	60 days		No
Malawi	eVisa	30 days		No
Malaysia	Visa not required	30 days	90 days within any 180-day period.	Yes
Maldives	Visa not required	30 days		Yes
Mali	Visa required		Holders of passports for public affairs do not require a visa.	Yes
Malta	Visa required			No
Marshall Islands	Visa required			Yes
Mauritania	eVisa		Available at Nouakchott–Oumtounsy International Airport.; Holders of passports for public affairs do not require a visa.	No
Mauritius	Visa not required	90 days		Yes
Mexico	Visa required		National visa may be substituted with a valid visa (of any category except transit) or permanent residency issued by Canada, Japan, United Kingdom, United States, or a Schengen Area member state, may enter visa-free for 180 days.; Holders of permanent residency in Chile or Colombia may enter visa-free for 180 days.; Note: Temporary residence cards, permits or other documents issued by those countries such as EU temporary residency card, Canadian study/work permit, or U.S. I-20 form, EAD card are NOT accepted for entering Mexico. Only valid visas (of any category, except transit visa) physically affixed in the passport are accepted.	Yes
Micronesia	Visa not required	30 days		No
Moldova	eVisa		Except for holders of residence permits or valid visas (excluding transit visas), issued by one of the Member States of the European Union or one of the States Parties to the Schengen Agreement, by the United Kingdom of Great Britain and Northern Ireland, the United States of America, Canada which may travel to the Republic of Moldova during their validity.; Holders of passports for public affairs do not require a visa.; Chinese citizens can apply for a visa online without a need for an invitation letter.	No
Monaco	Visa required			Yes
Mongolia	eVisa	30 days		No
Montenegro	Visa required		National visa may be substituted with a valid Schengen visa, a valid visa of Australia, Cyprus, Japan, Canada, New Zealand, Ireland, the United States of America and the United Kingdom.; Also a residence permit in the countries of the Schengen zone, Australia, Cyprus, Japan, Canada, New Zealand, Ireland, the United States of America and the United Kingdom for up to 30 days per stay.	No
Morocco	Visa not required	90 days		No
Mozambique	Electronic Travel Authorization	30 days	Visitors must register their ETA on the e-Visa platform at least 48 hours before travel and pay a processing fee of 650 MZN.; Can be extendable for another 30 days.	No
Myanmar	eVisa / Visa on arrival	28 days	Visa policy of the Myanmar government does not apply to militia-controlled areas where the central government does not exercise actual control.; e-Visa holders must arrive via Yangon, Nay Pyi Taw or Mandalay airports or via land border crossings with Thailand — Tachileik, Myawaddy and Kawthaung or India — Rih Khaw Dar and Tamu.; e-Visa available for both tourism (allowed stay is 28 days) or business (allowed stay is 70 days) purposes.; Until 29 August 2027, visa on arrival can be issued at Yangon, Nay Pyi Taw or Mandalay airport and is valid for 30 days.; Residents in bordering provinces can apply for an entry-exit pass that work with their automated border control system to expedite crossing.	No
Namibia	eVisa	3 months	Namibian authorities have proposed waiving visa requirements for citizens of China.	No
Nauru	Visa on arrival	90 days	According to Timatic, citizens of China can obtain a visa on arrival valid for a maximum of 90 days.; Holders of passports for public affairs do not require a visa.	No
Nepal	Online Visa / Free visa on arrival	90 days	Visa is issued free of charge for Chinese tourists.	No
Netherlands	Visa required			No
New Zealand	Online Visa required		May enter using eGate.; Holders of an Australian Permanent Resident Visa or Resident Return Visa may be granted a New Zealand Resident Visa on arrival permitting indefinite stay (pursuant to the Trans-Tasman Travel Arrangement), subject to meeting character requirements and obtaining an Electronic Travel Authority prior to departure.; Transit visa not required for passengers with an NZaTA flying to or from Australia and remaining airside for no longer than 24 hours.; Visas issued with a maximum of 5-year validity period.; From 3 November 2025 until further notice, Chinese tourists traveling from Australia with a valid Australian visitor, work, student or family visa will be able to travel to New Zealand for up to 3 months with an NZeTA.; Transit visa not required for passengers with an NZaTA remaining airside for no longer than 24 hours.	No
Nicaragua	eVisa			Yes
Niger	Visa required		Holders of passports for public affairs do not require a visa.	Yes
Nigeria	eVisa	90 days	Holders of passports for public affairs do not require a visa.	No
North Macedonia	Visa required		National visa may be substituted with a valid visa or a residence permit issued by a Schengen Area member state for stays up to 15 days if the visa is valid for at least five days beyond the period of intended stay in North Macedonia.; Until 31 December 2026, national visa may be substituted with a valid visa issued by the United States, Canada or United Kingdom for stays up to 15 days if the visa is valid for at least five days beyond the period of intended stay in North Macedonia.; Holders of passports for public affairs do not require a visa.; Visa exempt if the passport is endorsed "for public affairs".	No
Norway	Visa required			Yes
Oman	Visa not required / eVisa	14 days / 30 days	Chinese national are also eligible for single / multiple entry e-Visa valid for 30 days.	Yes
Pakistan	Free eVisa	90 days	Online Visa eligible.; Issued in 7-10 business days.	No
Palau	Free visa on arrival	30 days	The Chinese government declared Palau as an illegal destination of tour groups in August 2018, individual visitors from China are not affected.	No
Panama	Visa required		National visa may be substituted with a valid visa issued by Australia, Canada, the United States, Schengen (need to be valid for 6 months after entry) or the United Kingdom for up to 30 days.; As of 2 May 2019, visas are issued with a 5-year validity period for holiday, business and family visit purposes.; Holders of passports for public affairs do not require a visa.	Yes
Papua New Guinea	eVisa	30 days	Holders of passports for public affairs do not require a visa.; Chinese tourists traveling in registered and organized travel groups are eligible for a free 30-day single-entry visitor visa.	No
Paraguay	Visa required			Yes
Peru	Visa required		Nationals of China who have a valid US, Canada, Australia, Schengen Area, or UK visa or permanent resident permit can stay a visa-free up to 180 days for tourist or business purposes. The visa must be valid for a minimum of 6 months from the arrival date.	Yes
Philippines	Visa not required	14 days	eVisas issued to Chinese citizens are good for single-entry only. Holders of a valid eVisa must arrive via Ninoy Aquino International Airport (in Manila) or Mactan-Cebu International Airport (in Cebu).; Holders of a visa issued by Australia, Japan, Canada, USA or Schengen area do not require a visa for stay up to 7 days for tourism purpose.; Trial visa-exemption up to 14 days from 16 Jan 2026 to 15 Jan 2028.	No
Poland	Visa required			No
Portugal	Visa required			No
Qatar	Visa not required	30 days		Yes
Romania	Visa required			No
Russia	Visa not required	30 days	Visa-free until 31 December 2027.; Groups of 5 to 50 tourists can enter Russia without a visa for up to 15 days through pre-approved travel agencies.	Yes
Rwanda	eVisa / Visa on arrival	30 days		No
Saint Kitts and Nevis	Electronic Travel Authorisation	3 months		No
Saint Lucia	Visa not required	6 weeks		No
Saint Vincent and the Grenadines	Visa required			Yes
Samoa	Visa not required	30 days	90 days within any 180 day period.	Yes
San Marino	Visa not required	90 days	Although officially no visa is required, at least a Single Entry Schengen visa is required to enter San Marino since it does not have an own airport facility and no border controls.	Yes
São Tomé and Príncipe	eVisa / Visa on arrival	15 days	Holders of a visa issued by the United States and the Schengen Area do not require a visa.; Holders of passports for public affairs do not require a visa.	No
Saudi Arabia	eVisa / Visa on arrival	90 days		Yes
Senegal	Visa not required	3 months	Visa not required for less than 3 months stay Chinese ordinary passport holders.; Holders of passports for public affairs do not require a visa for 30 days.	No
Serbia	Visa not required	30 days	Holders of passports for public affairs do not require a visa up to 90 days within a 6-month period.; Long stay (up to 180 days) visas are issued free of charge.	Yes
Seychelles	Visa not required	3 months		Yes
Sierra Leone	eVisa / Visa on arrival	3 months / 30 days	Holders of passports for public affairs do not require a visa.	No
Singapore	Visa not required	30 days	Holders of travel documents other than Chinese passports must obtain visa in advance or transit without visa.	Yes
Slovakia	Visa required			No
Slovenia	Visa required			No
Solomon Islands	Visa not required	30 days	The mutual visa-free agreement for ordinary passport holders takes effect on 28 December 2024.	Yes
Somalia	eVisa	30 days		No
South Africa	Electronic Travel Authorization / eVisa	90 days	With ETA, Chinese passport holders may enter via O. R. Tambo International Airport or Cape Town Airport for stays up to 90 days.; ETA is valid for 1 year, multi-entry, with each stay up to 90 days.; ETA issuance is usually within an hour.; In addition to ETA, e-Visa is also available.	No
South Sudan	eVisa		Obtainable online.; Printed visa authorization must be presented at the time of travel.; Holders of passports for public affairs do not require a visa.	No
Spain	Visa required			No
Sri Lanka	Free ETA / Visa on arrival	30 days	Sri Lanka introduced an ETA valid for 30 days.	No
Sudan	Visa on arrival	60 days	Since 1 July 2026	Yes
Suriname	Visa not required	30 days	An entrance fee of USD 50 or EUR 50 must be paid online prior to arrival.; Multiple entry e-Visa is also available.	Yes
Sweden	Visa required			No
Switzerland	Visa required			No
Syria	eVisa			No
Tajikistan	Visa not required (conditional) / eVisa	14 days / 60 days	Holders of passports for public affairs do not require a visa.; Holders of passports which are 55 years old and more do not require a visa for 14 days.	No
Tanzania	eVisa / Visa on arrival	90 days		No
Thailand	Visa not required	60 days	The duration of stay is 60 days at a time, no more than 90 days within any 180 days.; 60-day visa can be extended while in Thailand.	Yes
Timor-Leste	Visa on arrival	30 days	Holders of passports for public affairs do not require a visa.	No
Togo	eVisa	15 days	Holders of passports for public affairs do not require a visa.	No
Tonga	Visa not required	30 days		Yes
Trinidad and Tobago	eVisa			No
Tunisia	Visa not required	90 days	For tourism purposes only. When entering the country, a paid hotel reservation (Bon-Voucher) and a round-trip flight ticket that matches the duration of the stay in Tunisia is required.	No
Turkey	Visa not required	90 days	90 days within any 180-day period.	No
Turkmenistan	eVisa		Holders of passports for public affairs do not require a visa.	Yes
Tuvalu	Visa on arrival	1 month		No
Uganda	eVisa	3 months	Can also be entered on an East Africa Tourist Visa issued by Kenya or Rwanda.	No
Ukraine	eVisa	30 days	Ukraine resumed its eVisa service in February 2025.	No
United Arab Emirates	Visa not required	90 days	90 days within any 180 day period.	Yes
United Kingdom and Crown dependencies	Visa required		Visa not required if holding a valid Irish visa endorsed with BIVS. Entry permitted only if first point of entry to the Common Travel Area is in Ireland.; Visas are issued for 2,5 or 10-year validity period for holiday and business purposes.; Visa not required for transit up to 48 hours if holding a valid US, Canada, Australia (physical sticker visa required), New Zealand, Ireland (Biometric visas only), and Schengen (D visa or residence permit only) visa or permanent residence permit. Need to depart from or fly to these countries and territories if not remaining airside, either directly or via reasonable routes.	No
United States	Visa required		Chinese citizens who do receive a visa are normally issued "120-month multiple-entry combination B1/B2 visas."; However, such B1/B2 visas are limited to "One month single-entry" for Chinese Communist Party members, their spouses and children under 21-year-old.; 10-year multiple-entry B visa holders must provide updates through the Electronic Visa Update System (EVUS) every two years.	Yes
Uruguay	Visa required		National visa may be substituted with a valid visa issued by the United States, Canada or a European Union member state for stays up to 90 days when arriving via Montevideo airport or Montevideo and Colonia ports.; U.S. Green Card Holders need to apply for a visa. Email your closest consulate to confirm.; As of 14 July 2018, visas are issued with a 10-year validity period for business purpose.; Holders of passports for public affairs do not require a visa.	No
Uzbekistan	Visa not required	30 days	The duration of stay is 30 days at a time, no more than 90 days within any 180 days.	Yes
Vanuatu	Visa not required	30 days		No
Vatican City	Visa required			Yes
Venezuela	eVisa		Introduction of Electronic Visa System for Tourist and Business Travelers.; Holders of passports for public affairs do not require a visa.	No
Vietnam	eVisa		e-Visa is valid for 90 days and multiple entry.; Holders of passports for public affairs do not require a visa.; Visa not required for 30 days for Phu Quoc island, including transiting through Noi Bai International Airport or Tan Son Nhat International Airport.; Visa collection on arrival can be arranged online through travel agencies and are available at Ho Chi Minh City, Hanoi, Da Nang, Nha Trang and Phu Quoc airports.; ordinary passports endorsed "for public affairs" may enter Vietnam without a visa.	No
Yemen	Visa required			Yes
Zambia	Visa not required	30 days	Also eligible for a universal visa allowing access to Zimbabwe.	No
Zimbabwe	eVisa / Visa on arrival	1 month	Also eligible for a universal visa allowing access to Zambia.	No

== Dependent, disputed, or restricted territories ==
Unrecognized or partially recognized countries

Territory	Conditions of access	Notes
Abkhazia	Visa required	
Kosovo	Visa required	Visa is not required for holders of a valid travel documents issued by EU Member and Schengen States, United States of America, Canada, Australia and Japan based on the 1951 Convention on Refugee Status or the 1954 Convention on the Status of Stateless Persons, as well as holders of valid travel documents for foreigners (max. 15 days stay): Do not need a visa a holder of a valid biometric residence permit issued by one of the Schengen member states or a valid multi-entry Schengen Visa, a holder of a valid Laissez-Passer issued by United Nations Organizations, NATO, OSCE, Council of Europe or European Union a holder of a valid travel documents issued by EU Member and Schengen States, United States of America, Canada, Australia and Japan based on the 1951 Convention on Refugee Status or the 1954 Convention on the Status of Stateless Persons, as well as holders of valid travel documents for foreigners (max. 15 days stay)
Northern Cyprus	Visa not required	
Palestine	Visa not required	Arrival by sea to Gaza Strip not allowed.
Sahrawi Arab Democratic Republic		Undefined visa regime in the Western Sahara controlled territory.
Somaliland	Visa on arrival	30 days for USD 30, payable on arrival.
South Ossetia	Visa required	To enter South Ossetia, visitors must have a multiple-entry visa for Russia and register their stay with the Migration Service of the Ministry of Internal Affairs within 3 days.
Transnistria	Visa not required	Registration required after 24h.

Dependent and autonomous territories

Territory	Conditions of access	Notes
Denmark
Faroe Islands	Visa required	
Greenland	Visa required	
France
Clipperton Island	Special permit required	
French Guiana	Visa required	
French Polynesia	Conditional visa waiver	15 days, must travel with specific agencies
Guadeloupe	Visa required	Visa not required of cruise ship passengers during the period of the stopover if hold residence permit issued by EU / EEA country, Switzerland, Canada, Japan or USA
Martinique	Visa required	
Saint Barthélemy	Visa required	
Saint Martin	Visa required	
Mayotte	Visa required	
New Caledonia	Conditional visa waiver	15 days, must travel with specific agencies
Réunion	Conditional visa waiver	15 days, must travel with specific agencies
Saint Pierre and Miquelon	Visa required	Holders of a Canadian photo ID (e.g. a driver's licence, health card, student card, or permanent resident card), traveling directly from Canada, do not require a visa.
Wallis and Futuna	Visa required	
Netherlands
Aruba	Visa required	Holders of a valid visa issued by a Canada, US or Schengen Member State ('C' or 'D' visa) do not require a visa for 90 days for each territory.
Caribbean Netherlands	Visa required	Holders of a valid visa issued by a Canada, US or Schengen Member State ('C' or 'D' visa) do not require a visa for 90 days for each territory.
Curaçao	Visa required	Holders of a valid visa issued by a Canada, US or Schengen Member State ('C' or 'D' visa) do not require a visa for 90 days for each territory.
Sint Maarten	Visa required	Holders of a valid visa issued by a Canada, US or Schengen Member State ('C' or 'D' visa) do not require a visa for 90 days for each territory.
New Zealand
Cook Islands	Visa not required	31 days
Niue	Visa not required	30 days
Tokelau	Permit required	
Norway
(Norway) Jan Mayen	Permit required	Permit issued by the local police required for staying for less than 24 hours and permit issued by the Norwegian police for staying for more than 24 hours.
(Norway) Svalbard	Visa not required	Unlimited period under Svalbard Treaty.
United Kingdom
Akrotiri and Dhekelia	Visa required	
Anguilla	Visa required	Visa not required with a valid visa or residence permit from the United States, Canada or the United Kingdom.
Bermuda	Visa required	Holders of a multiple-entry visa issued by Canada, US or the UK is valid for at least 45 days beyond the period of intended stay in Bermuda do not require a visa for three months. Visa free for a maximum stay of three months if transiting through the United Kingdom.
British Indian Ocean Territory	Special permit required	
British Virgin Islands	Visa not required	6 months for business and tourism purposes
Cayman Islands	Visa required	Visa free for cruise ship passengers leaving on the day of arrival. Visa not required for 30 days for holders of a valid multiple-entry visa for the US, UK and/or Canada.
Falkland Islands	Visa required	
Gibraltar	Visa required	Holders of a valid visa issued by the United Kingdom do not require a visa. Visa not required if holding a Schengen multiple entry visa with a minimum remaining validity of 7 days or visiting on a day trip as part of an organised tour arranged through a Gibraltar-based tour operator.
Montserrat	eVisa	
Pitcairn Islands	Visa not required	14 days visa free and landing fee US$35 or tax of US$5 if not going ashore.
Saint Helena	eVisa	
Ascension Island	Admission refused	From May 2015 Ascension Island Government does not issue entry visas including eVisas to nationals of China.
Tristan da Cunha	Permission required	Permission to land required for 15/30 pounds sterling (yacht/ship passenger) for Tristan da Cunha Island or 20 pounds sterling for Gough Island, Inaccessible Island or Nightingale Islands.
South Georgia and the South Sandwich Islands	Permit required	Pre-arrival permit from the Commissioner required (72 hours/1 month for 110/160 pounds sterling).
Turks and Caicos Islands	Visa not required	90 days
United States
American Samoa	Entry permit required	
Guam	Visa required	
Northern Mariana Islands	Visa required	
Puerto Rico	Visa required	
U.S. Virgin Islands	Visa required	
Antarctica and adjacent islands
Special permits required for Bouvet Island, British Antarctic Territory, French Southern and Antarctic Lands, Argentine Antarctica, (Australia) Australian Antarctic Territory, (Antártica Chilena Province) Chilean Antarctic Territory, (Australia) Heard Island and McDonald Islands, (Norway) Peter I Island, (Norway) Queen Maud Land, (New Zealand) Ross Dependency.

Other Territories

- Australia. Ashmore and Cartier Islands - Special authorisation required.
- Colombia. San Andrés and Leticia - Visitors arriving at Gustavo Rojas Pinilla International Airport and Alfredo Vásquez Cobo International Airport must buy tourist cards on arrival.
- Crimea - Visa issued by Russia is required.
- Ecuador. Galápagos - Online pre-registration is required. Transit Control Card must also be obtained at the airport prior to departure.
- Eritrea outside Asmara - To travel in the rest of the country, a Travel Permit for Foreigners is required (20 Eritrean nakfa).
- Fiji. Lau Province - Special permission required.
- (Greece) Mount Athos - Special permit required (4 days: 25 euro for Orthodox visitors, 35 euro for non-Orthodox visitors, 18 euro for students). There is a visitors' quota: maximum 100 Orthodox and 10 non-Orthodox per day and women are not allowed.
- India. Prior approval from the MHA required for whole of Arunachal Pradesh, Nagaland, Manipur, Mizoram and Sikkim and parts of states Uttaranchal, Jammu and Kashmir, Rajasthan, Himachal Pradesh. Restricted Area Permit (RAP) required for all of Andaman and Nicobar Islands and parts of Sikkim. Some of these requirements are occasionally lifted for a year.
- Iran. Kish Island - Visa not required.
- Kazakhstan. Closed cities - Special permission required for the town of Baikonur and surrounding areas in Kyzylorda Oblast, and the town of Gvardeyskiy near Almaty.
- Kurdistan Region. You can apply for an e-Visa (30 days) to visit the Iraqi Kurdistan Region.
- Malaysia. Sabah and Sarawak - Malaysian Visa / eNTRI required. These states have their own immigration authorities but same visa policies applies as West Malaysia. However a single entry Visa / eNTRI is valid for multiple entry/exit between the territories inside Malaysia.
- Maldives outside Malé - Permission required. Tourists are generally prohibited from visiting non-resort islands without the express permission of the Government of Maldives.
- North Korea outside Pyongyang - Special permit required. People are not allowed to leave the capital city, tourists can only leave the capital with a governmental tourist guide (no independent moving).
- Russia - Several closed cities and regions in Russia require special authorization.
- (Saudi Arabia) Mecca and Medina - Special access required. Non-Muslims and those following the Ahmadiyya religious movement are strictly prohibited from entry.
- Sudan. Darfur - Separate travel permit is required.
- Sudan outside Khartoum - All foreigners traveling more than 25 kilometers outside of Khartoum must obtain a travel permit.
- Tajikistan. Gorno-Badakhshan Autonomous Province - OIVR permit required (15+5 Tajikistani Somoni) and another special permit (free of charge) is required for Lake Sarez.
- Turkmenistan. Closed cities - A special permit, issued prior to arrival by Ministry of Foreign Affairs, is required if visiting the following places: Atamurat, Cheleken, Dashoguz, Serakhs and Serhetabat.
- United States. Closed city of Mercury, Nevada, United States - Special authorization is required for entry into Mercury.
- United States. United States Minor Outlying Islands - Special permits required for Baker Island, Howland Island, Jarvis Island, Johnston Atoll, Kingman Reef, Midway Atoll, Palmyra Atoll and Wake Island.
- Venezuela. Margarita Island - Visa not required. All visitors are fingerprinted.
- Vietnam. Phú Quốc - Visa not required for 30 days.
- Yemen outside Sanaa or Aden – Special permission needed for travel outside Sanaa or Aden.
- (United Nations) UN Buffer Zone in Cyprus - Access Permit is required for travelling inside the zone, except Civil Use Areas.
- (United Nations) Korean Demilitarized Zone - Restricted area.
- (United Nations) UNDOF Zone and Ghajar - Restricted area.

== Hong Kong, Macau and Taiwan ==
=== Hong Kong and Macau SARs ===
- Rather than passports, Chinese citizens from mainland China may travel to Hong Kong and Macau with an in-lieu travel document named Exit-Entry Permit for Travelling to and from Hong Kong and Macau (EEP-HKMO) to align with the position that Hong Kong and Macau are Chinese territories rather than foreign. EEP holders must apply for an endorsement which serves as both the exit permission from mainland China and the de facto entry ticket for Hong Kong or Macau. EEP holders without an endorsement shall be prohibited from departing from mainland China. It is the Immigration in mainland China rather than that in Hong Kong and Macau that is responsible for issuing endorsements.
- Chinese passport holders intending to transit via Hong Kong or Macao between mainland China and a foreign third place may travel directly with their Chinese passport without applying for EEP and an endorsement. They are eligible for stay up to 7 days without a (de facto) entry ticket.
- Chinese passport holders residing abroad on a long-term basis may apply for a sticker-style HKSAR entry permit at Chinese missions abroad. The sticker shall allow up to (1) two entries within three months, 30 days stay for each entry; or (2) multiple entries within two years, 14 days stay for each entry. There is no similar sticker for Macao. Instead, they can enter Macao for 7 days (extendable to 90 days) if they possess a document showing that they reside abroad on a long-term basis.

Regions	Travel with in-lieu travel documents	Travel with Chinese passport from mainland China or overseas
Hong Kong	EEP-HKMO and endorsement required.	* Transit between mainland China and a foreign third place for up to 7 days without EEP-HKMO or endorsement. * May enter for 14 or 30 days if in possession of sticker-style entry permit.
Macau	EEP-HKMO and endorsement required.	* Transit between mainland China and a foreign third place for up to 7 days without EEP-HKMO or endorsement. * May enter for 7 days (extendable to 90 days) if in possession of a document that can prove long-term residency abroad.

=== Taiwan ===
Taiwan and mainland China have been under separated governance since 1949, respectively ruled by the Government of the Republic of China and the Government of the People's Republic of China due to the Chinese Civil War. Even though neither party regards the people of the other as foreigner, movement of people between mainland China and Taiwan is subject to immigration restrictions impose by both parties, either for immigrants or visitors. Chinese Mainlanders are subject to Taiwan immigration requirements, and are also subject to Mainland exit permission requirements if they are boarding a ferry or flight directly heading to Taiwan departing from the Mainland.

Exit-related restrictions include:

- Rather than Chinese passports, Chinese Government requires Mainlanders to travel to Taiwan with an in-lieu travel document named Exit-Entry Permit for Travelling to and from Taiwan (EEP-TW) to align with its sovereignty claim over Taiwan.
- EEP-TW holders requires an endorsement (exit permission) or they will be refused exit from mainland China.
- Chinese passport holders intending to transit via Taiwan between mainland China and a foreign third place but without an endorsed EEP-TW are usually refused exit, unless they depart from Taiwan Transit Pilot Program cities: Chongqing, Nanchang, and Kunming.

Entry-related restrictions include:

- Chinese Mainlanders need Exit & Entry Permit for Taiwan, Republic of China (hereinafter the "Permit") issued by Taiwan Immigration or they will be refused entry. The Permit, when produced, shall be accompanied by a mainland China travel document, either the Chinese passport or EEP-TW, as the case may be.
- For Mainlanders residing in the Mainland and applying for the Permit for the purpose of tourism, it's the policy of Taiwan Immigration that the Permit shall not be issued without a valid exit-permission issued by mainland China Immigration. As the Mainland Immigration suspended issuance of such exit-permission since 2019, and the Taiwan Immigration suspended the issuance of the Permit accordingly, Mainlanders residing in mainland China may not travel to Taiwan for the tourism purpose for now.
- Chinese passport holders residing in Hong Kong, Macau or a foreign place on a long-term basis may apply directly to the Taiwan Immigration for a Permit. They do not need an EEP-TW or an endorsement (exit permission) to apply for the Permit, and may travel to Taiwan directly from a place other than mainland China.

Travel with in-lieu travel documents	Travel with Chinese passport from mainland China	Travel with Chinese passport from overseas
EEP-TW (in-lieu travel document) required, endorcement (exit permission) required.; Issuance of endorcement (exit permission) for tourism purpose for mainland Chinese residents residing in mainland China remains suspended.; Exit & Entry Permit Taiwan required except for airside transit.	Exit from China usually refused except for transit through Taiwan departing from certain cities.; EEP-TW and endorcement (exit permission) not required if transiting via Taiwan between mainland China and a foreign third place, and departing from the Mainland cities of Chongqing, Kunming or Nanchang.; Exit & Entry Permit is not required when transiting through sterile area of a Taiwanese airport on the same calendar day.	Chinese passport and Exit & Entry Permit Taiwan required.; Exit & Entry Permit is not required when transiting through sterile area of a Taiwanese airport on the same calendar day.

- For tourists residing overseas (including Hong Kong and Macau) since 1 September 2023, and medical, business and student purpose permit issuance has been resumed earlier.

== Non-ordinary passports ==
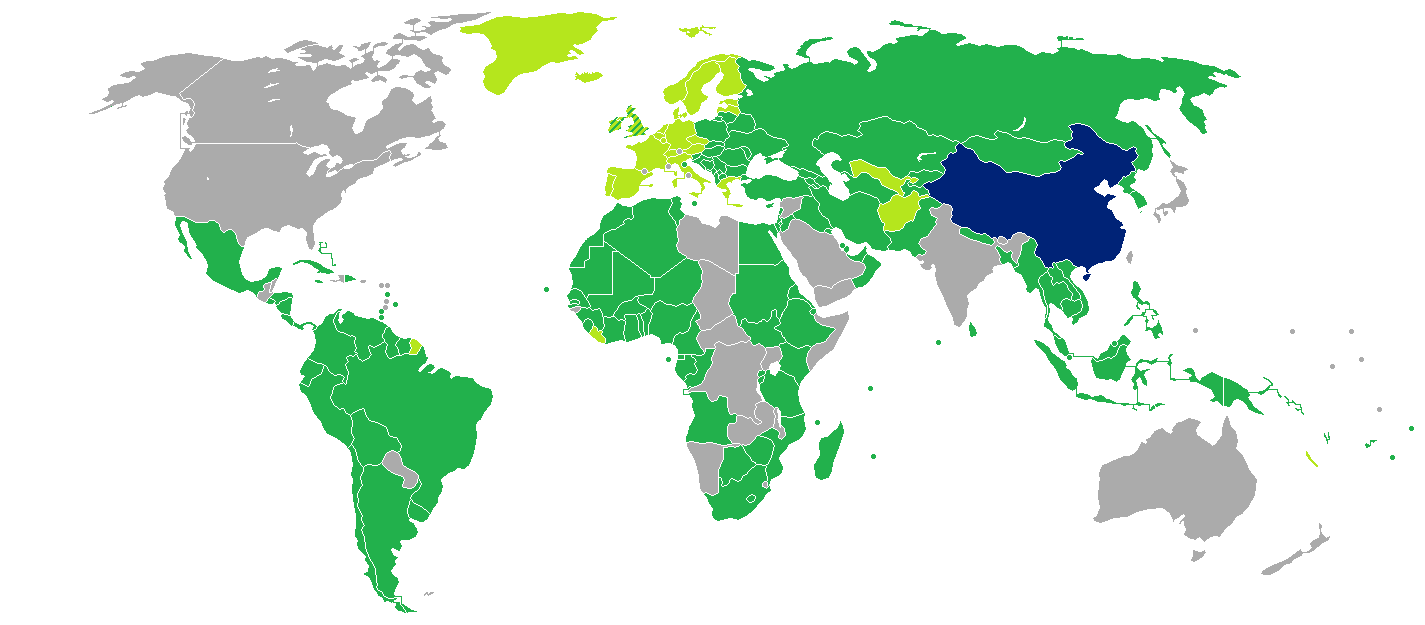
Visa requirements for Chinese citizens holding diplomatic or service passports based on bilateral agreements People's Republic of China Visa-free for holders of both diplomatic and service passports Visa-free for holders of diplomatic passports only

Holders of Chinese diplomatic or official / service passports may enter the following countries without a visa.

Diplomatic passports only

- Afghanistan
- Austria
- Belgium
- Czech Republic
- Estonia
- Finland
- France
- Germany
- Greece
- Iceland
- Ireland^{O}
- Italy
- Latvia
- Liberia
- Luxembourg
- Netherlands
- Norway
- Spain
- Sweden
- Switzerland
- United Kingdom^{O}
- Uzbekistan

_{O - Official passports are limited to those traveling with a delegation of ministerial level or higher.}

Diplomatic and official / service passports

- Albania
- Algeria
- Angola
- Armenia
- Azerbaijan
- Bahrain
- Bangladesh
- Barbados
- Belarus
- Bolivia
- Bosnia and Herzegovina
- Botswana
- Brazil
- Brunei
- Bulgaria
- Burkina Faso
- Burundi
- Cameroon
- Cambodia
- Cape Verde
- Chad
- Chile
- Colombia
- Comoros
- Congo
- Costa Rica
- Côte d'Ivoire
- Croatia
- Cyprus
- Dominican Republic
- Ecuador
- El Salvador
- Eritrea
- Egypt
- Equatorial Guinea
- Gabon
- Gambia
- Georgia
- Ghana
- Grenada
- Guinea
- Guyana
- Honduras
- Hungary
- Indonesia
- Iran
- Iraq
- Israel
- Kazakhstan
- Kenya
- Kuwait
- Kyrgyzstan
- Laos
- Lebanon
- Lesotho
- Lithuania
- Madagascar
- Maldives
- Mali
- Mexico
- Malaysia
- Malta
- Mauritania
- Moldova
- Mongolia
- Montenegro
- Morocco
- Mozambique
- Myanmar
- Nepal
- Nicaragua
- Niger
- Nigeria
- North Korea
- North Macedonia
- Oman
- Pakistan
- Panama
- Peru
- Philippines
- Poland
- Romania
- Russia
- Rwanda
- São Tomé and Príncipe
- Senegal
- Serbia
- Sierra Leone
- Singapore
- Slovakia
- Slovenia
- South Africa
- South Korea
- South Sudan
- Sri Lanka
- Sudan
- Suriname
- Tajikistan
- Tanzania
- Thailand
- Timor-Leste
- Togo
- Tonga
- Trinidad and Tobago
- Turkey
- Turkmenistan
- Ukraine
- United Arab Emirates
- Uruguay
- Venezuela
- Vietnam
- Zimbabwe

== APEC Business Travel Card ==
Full members of the scheme Transitional members (United States, Canada)

Holders of an APEC Business Travel Card (ABTC) travelling on business do not require a visa to the following countries:

- Australia^{2}
- Brunei^{2}
- Chile^{2}
- Hong Kong^{4}
- Indonesia^{4}
- Japan^{2}
- Malaysia^{2}
- Mexico^{1}
- New Zealand^{2}
- Papua New Guinea^{4}
- Peru^{2}
- Philippines^{4}
- Russia^{3}
- Singapore^{4}
- South Korea^{2}
- Taiwan^{2}
- Thailand^{2}
- Vietnam^{4}

_{1 - Up to 180 days}
_{2 - Up to 90 days}
_{3 - Up to 90 days in a period of 180 days}
_{4 - Up to 60 days}

The card must be used in conjunction with a passport and has the following advantages:

- No need to apply for a visa or entry permit to APEC countries, as the card is treated as such (except by Canada and United States)
- Undertake legitimate business in participating economies
- Expedited border crossing in all member economies, including transitional members
- The rule is not available among the CHN, HKG, TWN travellers on business

== Exit and Entry Permit ==
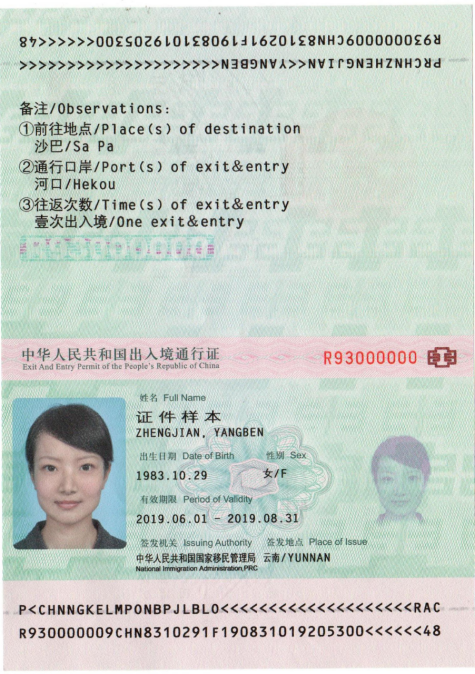
A sample of the personal info page of the Entry and Exit Permit for Border Tourism

In addition to passports, Exit and Entry Permit were issued to citizens of the People's Republic of China for visiting certain land neighboring countries for trade, tourism purposes without a passport, and visa to the country of visiting and vice versa under the bilateral agreements.
Such permit is issued by the police stations in the related border administrative divisions. By far, travelers from the administrative divisions that share borders with North Korea, Mongolia, Myanmar, Laos, Vietnam, India and Nepal could apply for the Exit-Entry Permit for crossing borders.

== Non-visa restrictions ==
=== Blank passport pages ===
Many countries require a minimum number of blank pages to be available in the passport being presented, typically one or two pages. Endorsement pages, which often appear after the visa pages, are not counted as being valid or available.

=== Vaccination ===
Cover of the new International Certificate of Vaccination issued by the Bureau of Quarantine in the Philippines since 2021

The African countries of Angola, Benin, Burkina Faso, Burundi, Cameroon, Central African Republic, Democratic Republic of the Congo, Republic of the Congo, Côte d'Ivoire, Gabon, Ghana, Guinea-Bissau, Mali, Niger, Sierra Leone and Togo, South Sudan and Uganda, along with French Guiana in South America, require all incoming passengers older than nine months to one year, to have a current International Certificate of Vaccination or Prophylaxis.

Some other countries require vaccination only if the passenger is coming from an infected area or has visited one recently or has transited for 12 hours in those countries: Algeria, Botswana, Cabo Verde, Chad, Djibouti, Egypt, Eswatini, Ethiopia, Gambia, Ghana, Guinea, Lesotho, Libya, Equatorial Guinea, Eritrea, Madagascar, Malawi, Mauritania, Mauritius, Mozambique, Namibia, Nigeria, Papua New Guinea, Seychelles, Somalia, South Africa, Sudan, Tunisia, Uganda, Tanzania, Zambia and Zimbabwe.

=== Passport validity length ===
Very few countries, such as Paraguay, just require a valid passport on arrival.

However many countries and groupings now require only an identity card – especially from their neighbours. Other countries may have special bilateral arrangements that depart from the generality of their passport validity length policies to shorten the period of passport validity required for each other's citizens or even accept passports that have already expired (but not been cancelled).

Some countries, such as Japan, Ireland and the United Kingdom, require a passport valid throughout the period of the intended stay.

In the absence of specific bilateral agreements, countries requiring passports to be valid for at least 6 more months on arrival include Afghanistan, Algeria, Anguilla, Bahrain, Bhutan, Botswana, British Virgin Islands, Brunei, Cambodia, Cameroon, Cape Verde, Cayman Islands, Central African Republic, Chad, Comoros, Costa Rica, Côte d'Ivoire, Curaçao, Ecuador, Egypt, El Salvador, Equatorial Guinea, Fiji, Gabon, Guinea Bissau, Guyana, Haiti, India, Indonesia, Iran, Iraq, Israel, Jordan, Kenya, Kiribati, Kuwait, Laos, Madagascar, Malaysia, Marshall Islands, Mongolia, Myanmar, Namibia, Nepal, Nicaragua, Nigeria, Oman, Palau, Papua New Guinea, Peru, Philippines, Qatar, Rwanda, Samoa, Saudi Arabia, Singapore, Solomon Islands, Somalia, Sri Lanka, Sudan, Suriname, Tanzania, Thailand, Timor-Leste, Tokelau, Tonga, Turkey, Tuvalu, Uganda, United Arab Emirates, Vanuatu, Venezuela, and Vietnam.

Countries requiring passports valid for at least 4 months on arrival include Micronesia and Zambia.

Countries requiring passports with a validity of at least 3 months beyond the date of intended departure include Azerbaijan, Bosnia and Herzegovina, Honduras, Montenegro, Nauru, Moldova and New Zealand. Similarly, the EEA countries of Iceland, Liechtenstein, Norway, all European Union countries (except Ireland) together with Switzerland also require 3 months validity beyond the date of the bearer's intended departure unless the bearer is an EEA or Swiss national.

Countries requiring passports valid for at least 3 months on arrival include Albania, North Macedonia, Panama, and Senegal.

Bermuda requires passports to be valid for at least 45 days upon entry.

Countries that require a passport validity of at least one month beyond the date of intended departure include Eritrea, Hong Kong, Lebanon, Macau, the Maldives and South Africa.

==== Maximum passport age ====
Countries of the Schengen area require non-EU passports to be less than 10 years old upon entry.

=== Criminal record ===
Some countries, including Australia, Canada, Fiji, New Zealand and the United States, routinely deny entry to non-citizens who have a criminal record, while others impose restrictions depending on the type of conviction and the length of the sentence.

=== Persona non grata ===
The government of a country can declare a diplomat persona non grata, banning them from entering the country or expelling them if they have already entered. In non-diplomatic use, the authorities of a country may also declare a foreigner persona non grata permanently or temporarily, usually because of unlawful activity.

=== Israeli stamps ===
Kuwait, Lebanon, Libya, and Yemen do not allow entry to people with passport stamps from Israel or whose passports have either a used or an unused Israeli visa, or where there is evidence of previous travel to Israel such as entry or exit stamps from neighbouring border posts in transit countries such as Jordan and Egypt.

To circumvent this Arab League boycott of Israel, the Israeli immigration services have now mostly ceased to stamp foreign nationals' passports on either entry to or exit from Israel (unless the entry is for some work-related purposes). Since 15 January 2013, Israel no longer stamps foreign passports at Ben Gurion Airport. Passports are still (as of 22 June 2017) stamped at Erez when passing into and out of Gaza.

Iran refuses admission to holders of passports containing an Israeli visa or stamp that is less than 12 months old.

=== Biometrics ===
Several countries mandate that all travellers, or all foreign travellers, be fingerprinted on arrival and will refuse admission to or even arrest travellers who refuse to comply. In some countries, such as the United States, this may apply even to transit passengers who merely wish to change planes rather than go landside.

Fingerprinting countries/regions include Afghanistan, Argentina, Brunei, Cambodia, China, Ethiopia, Ghana, Guinea, India, Japan, Kenya (both fingerprints and a photo are taken), Malaysia upon entry and departure, Mongolia, Saudi Arabia, the Schengen Area, Singapore, South Korea, Taiwan, Thailand, Uganda, the United Arab Emirates and the United States.

Many countries also require a photo be taken of people entering the country. The United States, which does not fully implement exit control formalities at its land frontiers (although long mandated by its own legislation), intends to implement facial recognition for passengers departing from international airports to identify people who overstay their visa.

Together with fingerprint and face recognition, iris scanning is one of three biometric identification technologies internationally standardised since 2006 by the International Civil Aviation Organization (ICAO) for use in e-passports and the United Arab Emirates conducts iris scanning on visitors who need to apply for a visa. The United States Department of Homeland Security has announced plans to greatly increase the biometric data it collects at US borders. In 2018, Singapore began trials of iris scanning at three land and maritime immigration checkpoints.

== Foreign travel statistics ==
These are the numbers of mainland Chinese visitors to various countries or territories:

Destination	Number of visitors	Year
American Samoa	861	2016
Angola	76,016	2015
Antarctica	5,289	2017
Antigua and Barbuda	739	2017
Australia	1,355,500	2017
Austria (Note: Counting only guests in tourist accommodation establishments.)	731,100	2016
Azerbaijan	7,363	2016
Bahamas	782	2013
Barbados	646	2016
Belgium	147,654	2016
Belize	2,920	2013
Bhutan	6,421	2017
Bolivia	12,861	2016
Bosnia and Herzegovina	31,776	2017
Botswana	6,386	2015
Brazil	61,250	2017
Burkina Faso	2,568	2016
Cambodia	830,003	2016
Canada	694,543	2017
Cayman Islands (Note: Data for arrivals by air only.)	250	2017
Chile	30,774	2017
Colombia	11,528	2015
Congo	9,641	2012
Cook Islands	804	2017
Costa Rica	13,612	2017
Croatia	159,301	2017
Cuba	31,733	2015
Cyprus (Note: Including Hong Kong.)	5,032	2018
Czech Republic	491,648	2017
Denmark	221,000 (Note: Tourists only.)	2016
Dominica	354	2015
Dominican Republic	5,103	2017
Estonia	19,698	2017
Eswatini	2,732	2016
Fiji	48,796	2017
Finland	202,722	2018
France	2,196,995	2015
French Polynesia	4,479	2017
Germany	1,363,979	2016
Georgia	31,855	2018
Greece	55,097	2015
Guam	21,856	2017
Hong Kong Special Administrative Region	44,445,259	2017
Hungary	170,835	2016
Iceland	89,495	2018
India	247,235	2017
Indonesia	1,556,771	2016
Israel	113,600	2018
Italy	280,000	2016
Jamaica	3,892	2017
Japan	7,355,800	2017
Jordan	37,092	2016
Kazakhstan	94,817	2017
Kiribati	98	2017
Kyrgyzstan	29,900	2017
Laos	639,185	2017
Latvia	22,774	2017
Lebanon	6,227	2016
Lithuania	12,000	2016
Luxembourg	35,697	2016
Macao Special Administrative Region	22,196,203	2017
Madagascar	3,774	2015
Malaysia	2,281,666	2017
Malawi	4,715	2009
Maldives	306,530	2017
Mali	3,201	2014
Marshall Islands	118	2017
Mauritius	72,951	2017
Mexico	141,692	2017
Micronesia	2,817	2017
Mongolia	144,070	2017
Montenegro	7,932	2014
Morocco	118,000	2017
Myanmar	183,886	2016
Namibia	12,195	2015
Nepal	66,984	2015
Netherlands	365,000	2017
Niue	1	2017
New Caledonia	280	2017
New Zealand	417,872	2017
North Macedonia	6,565	2016
Northern Mariana Islands	229,389	2017
Oman	20,021	2017
Pakistan	30,100	2009
Palau	55,491	2017
Panama	17,293	2015
Papua New Guinea	12,937	2016
Peru	31,408	2017
Philippines	968,447	2017
Poland	97,700	2016
Qatar	45,627	2017
Romania	30,700	2016
Russia	1,780,200	2017
Samoa	2,718	2017
Serbia	184,042	2025
Seychelles	12,006	2017
Singapore	3,226,929	2017
Slovakia	41,332	2016
Slovenia	62,905	2017
Solomon Islands	1,215	2017
South Africa	84,691	2015
South Korea	4,169,353	2017
Spain	649,032	2018
Sri Lanka (Note: Including Hong Kong and Macau.)	268,952	2017
Suriname	5,511	2017
Taiwan	2,732,549	2017
Tanzania	34,472	2016
Tonga	2,021	2017
Thailand	9,805,753	2017
Timor-Leste (Note: Data for arrivals by air only.)	7,696	2017
Turkey	394,109	2018
Tuvalu	61	2017
Ukraine	29,561	2017
United Arab Emirates	764,000	2017
United Kingdom	358,000	2017
United States (Note: Total number includes tourists, business people, students, exchange visitors, temporary workers and families, diplomats and other representatives and all other classes of non-immigrant admissions (I-94).)	3,383,133	2017
Uzbekistan	11,800	2015
Vanuatu	3,612	2017
Vietnam	4,008,253	2017
Zambia	20,648	2016

== See also ==
- Visa policy of China
- Visa requirements for Chinese citizens of Hong Kong
- Visa requirements for Chinese citizens of Macau
- International recognition of Taiwan
