= Exit and Entry Permit =

Exit and Entry Permit or variants may also refer to:

- Exit and Entry Permit (China), a travel document issued by the National Immigration Administration of China to Chinese citizens.
- Hong Kong and Macao Travel Permit, alternatively known as the Exit-Entry Permit for Travelling to and from Hong Kong and Macao
- Entry & Exit Permit for Taiwan, formally the Exit and Entry Permit Taiwan Republic of China

== See also ==
- National Immigration Administration, alternatively known as the Exit and Entry Administration of the People's Republic of China
- Taiwan Travel Permit, for mainland Chinese citizens to travel to and return from the Taiwan Area
