= Visa policy of Taiwan =

Policy on permits required to enter Taiwan

Visitors to Taiwan must obtain a visa or authorization in advance unless they are citizens from one of the visa-exempt countries or citizens eligible for an e-Visa.

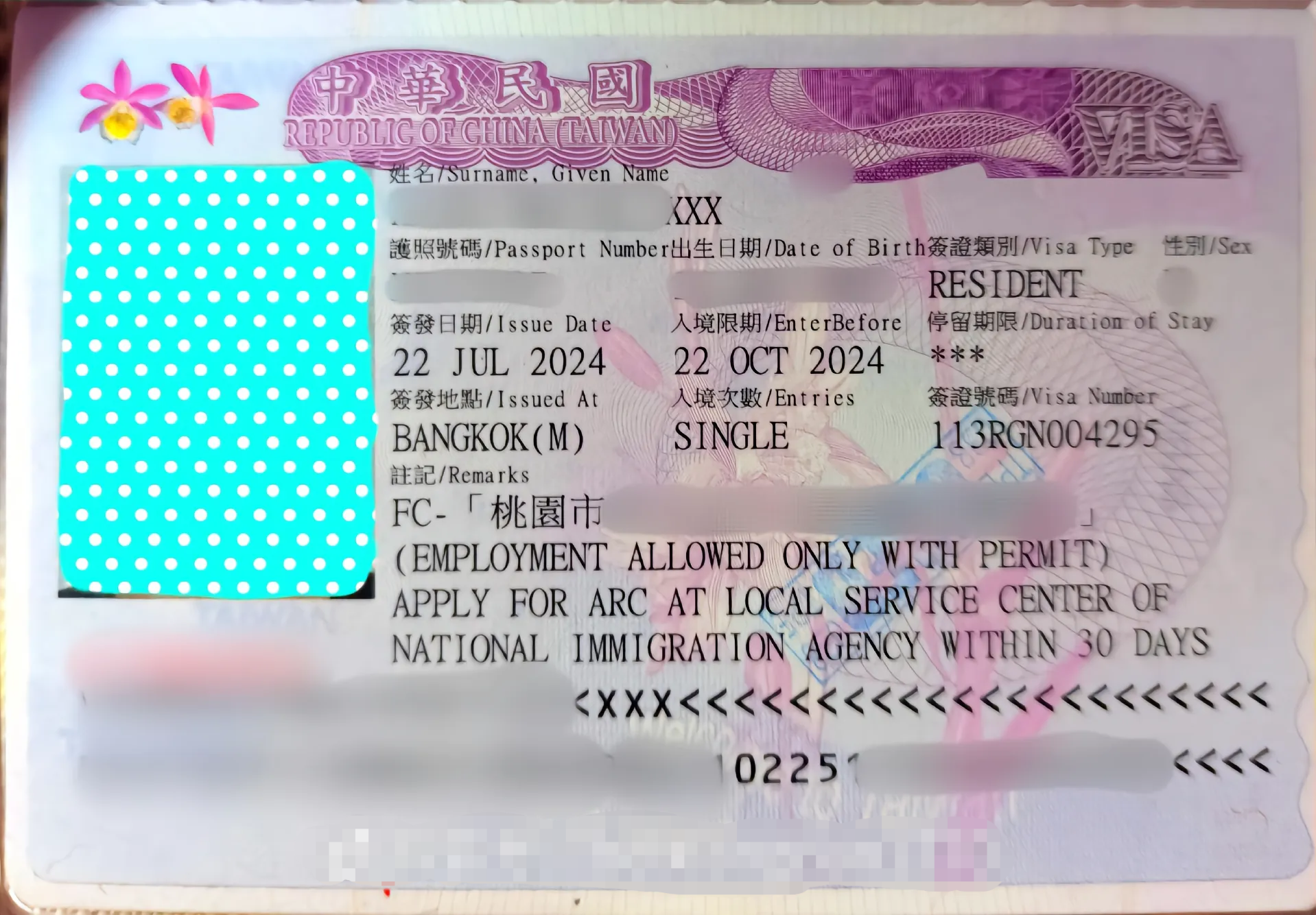
A Taiwan residence (long-term student) visa issued in 2024

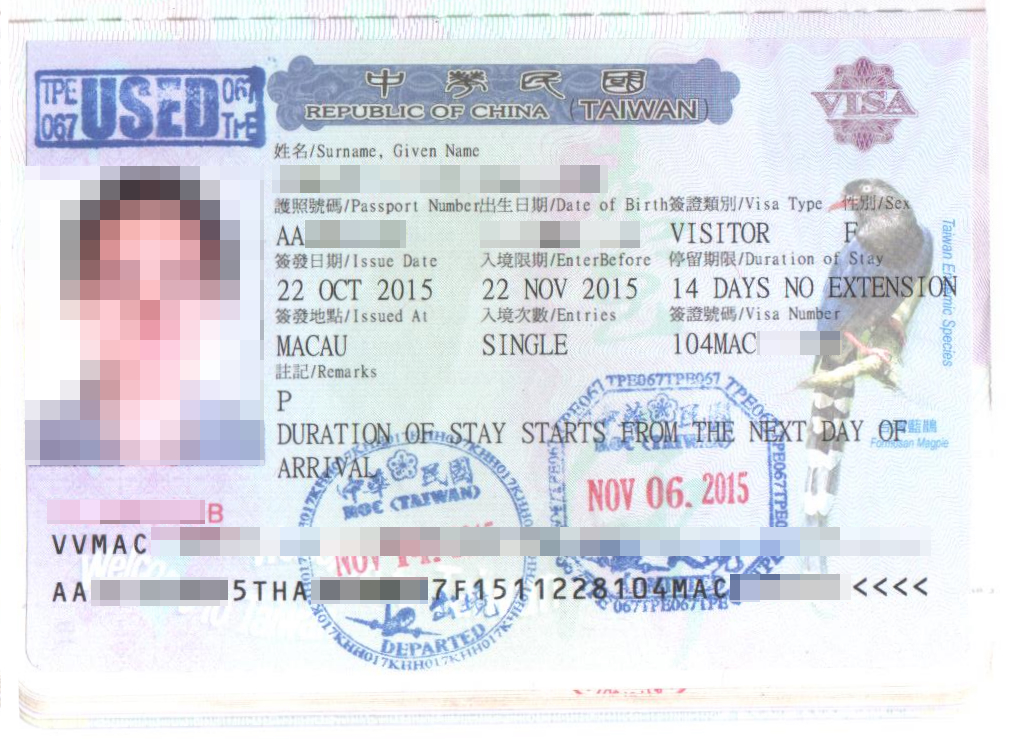
A Taiwan visitor visa issued to a Thai citizen by Taipei Economic and Cultural Office in Macau

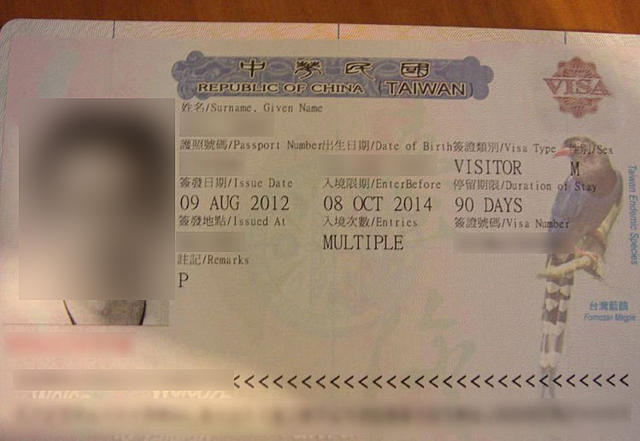
Visa sample of Taiwan (old version)

All visitors must hold a passport valid for 6 months (except citizens of Japan and the United States who are only required to hold a passport valid for the entire duration of stay).

Taiwan has special entry requirements to current or former nationals of the People's Republic of China (PRC, commonly known as China) who reside or previously resided in Mainland China. Furthermore, nationals of certain countries must follow different requirements for applications of visitor visas.

Taiwan's immigration system separates work rights and rights of abode from visas. Work rights are regulated though Work Permits issued by the Workforce Development Agency, while Resident Certificates issued by the National Immigration Agency control residence rights. Talent Taiwan was created in 2023 to provide a single agency that could provide advice across all such aspects.

== Entry requirements ==
=== TWAC (Taiwan Arrival Card) ===
Before entering Taiwan, all visitors (Note: Except for foreign nationals holding "Alien Resident Certificate", "Resident Visa", or "Diplomatic ID card", People of Mainland, Hong Kong and Macau with Single Entry & Exit Permit and nationals without household registration with residence certificates of Taiwan Area.) are required to submit a TWAC online, which provides personal information and trip details, to Taiwan immigration.

The TWAC must be submitted within three days before the date of arrival in Taiwan, to avoid unnecessary delays during immigration clearance. It is free of charge and is not a visa, so visitors may have different requirements according to their nationality.

== Visa policy map ==
Visa policy of Taiwan Taiwan Exit & Entry Permit Visa not required (90 days) Visa not required (30 days) Visa not required (14 days) eVisa eVisa (conditional) / Visa required Visa required

== Right of abode ==
Although the ROC has only one type of nationality, not all ROC nationals have the right of abode in Taiwan. Under the Immigration Act, only those with household registration in Taiwan (nationals with household registration, or NWHRs) have the right of abode in Taiwan and can enter Taiwan without prior authorisation. Holding one of the documents listed below is sufficient to demonstrate such status:

- A Taiwan passport with the individual's National Identification Card number on the biodata page;
- Valid National Identification Card, household registration certificate, or household registration certificate transcript accompanied by a valid Taiwan passport without National ID number on the biodata page.

ROC nationals without household registration in Taiwan (NWOHRs) are ineligible to receive a National Identification Card and their passport would not contain their National ID number. To enter Taiwan, one must, in addition to a Taiwan passport, hold one of the following documents:

- A valid or expired entry permit affixed on the passport; or,
- A Taiwanese Resident Certificate.

NWOHRs holding documentation listed below can obtain an entry permit on arrival:

- An added signing on the passport stating one's overseas Chinese status, or a letter stating such status; or
- A long-term residence (type F-2) or permanent residence (type F-5) Certificate of Alien Registration issued by South Korea.

Alternatively, they may enter Taiwan with their non-ROC passports without prior authorization if they also have nationalities of a visa-exempt country.

NWOHRs are subject to immigration control while in Taiwan, and can only remain in Taiwan for a limited time authorized by the entry permit or the immigration officer. Those without any of the above-listed documents will be denied entry to Taiwan.

== Visa exemption ==
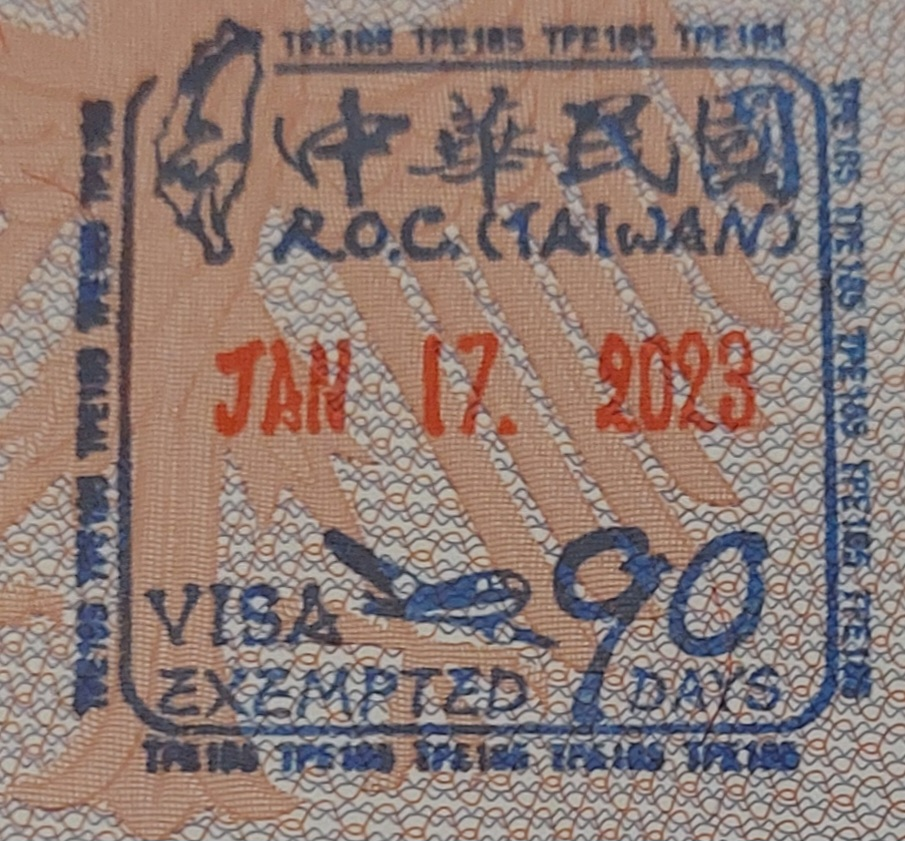
Entry stamp for 90-day visa exempt

Citizens of the following countries and territories may enter Taiwan for stays up to the duration listed below. Extensions are not possible except for citizens of Canada and the United Kingdom, who may apply to extend the stay from 90 days to 180 days in accordance with the principle of reciprocity.

Visitors must also meet the following requirements unless mentioned otherwise:

- hold a passport with remaining validity of at least six months as of the date of entry.
- passport is not an emergency, temporary or other informal passports or travel documents.
- a confirmed return air/sea ticket or air/sea ticket and a visa for the next destination, and a confirmed seat reservation for departure flight.

90 days

- All European Union member states

- Albania
- Andorra
- Australia
- Canada^{A}
- Chile
- Eswatini^{4}
- Guatemala
- Honduras^{3} ^{7}
- Iceland
- Israel
- Japan^{E}
- Kosovo
- Liechtenstein
- Marshall Islands^{5}
- Monaco
- New Zealand
- North Macedonia^{1}
- Norway
- Palau
- Paraguay
- San Marino
- South Korea
- Switzerland
- Tuvalu^{4}
- United Kingdom^{6 A}
- United States^{9 E}
- Vatican City

30 days

- Belize^{4}
- Dominican Republic^{7}
- Malaysia
- Saint Kitts and Nevis^{4}
- Saint Lucia^{4}
- Saint Vincent and the Grenadines
- Singapore

14 days

- Brunei^{2 7 8 C D}
- Oman^{B}
- Philippines^{2 7 C D}
- Thailand^{2 7 C D}

_{1 — Effective until 31 March 2030.
2 — Effective until 31 July 2027.
3 — Persons born in mainland China are not eligible.
4 — Persons born in Afghanistan, mainland China, Iran, Iraq, Libya, Nigeria, Pakistan, Syria and Yemen are not eligible.
5 — Only for persons who acquired Marshallese citizenship at birth.
6 — For British citizens only.
7 — Diplomatic, official and service passports are not eligible.
8 — Brunei Certificate of Identity holders are also eligible.
9 — Emergency passports are eligible.
A — After arrival, may apply to extend stay from 90 days to 180 days for free.
B — May still apply for an e-Visa if intended stay is longer than 14 days.
C — Vessel/aircraft crew members or service personnel intending to board to report for duty are not eligible.
D — Must also provide proof of accommodation (hotel) booking, host/sponsor's contact information and sufficient travel funds.
E — Passports are only required to be valid for the intended period of stay.}

Date of visa changes

Visa exemption

- 1 January 1995: Australia, Austria, Belgium, Canada, France, Germany, Japan, Luxembourg, Netherlands, New Zealand, United Kingdom and United States
- 1 May 1995: Portugal, Spain and Sweden
- 1 January 1997: Italy
- 8 December 1997: Greece
- 1 January 2001: Switzerland
- 1 May 2001: Singapore
- 1 January 2002: Norway
- 1 October 2002: Finland and Liechtenstein
- 1 November 2002: Malaysia
- 25 January 2003: South Korea
- 1 April 2003: Denmark, Iceland, Ireland, Malta and Monaco
- 1 September 2007: Czech Republic
- 1 October 2008: Poland and Slovakia
- 1 November 2008: Hungary
- 21 November 2008: Lithuania
- 1 December 2008: Estonia
- 7 January 2009: Latvia
- 15 February 2009: Slovenia
- 28 September 2009: Holy See
- 11 November 2010: Bulgaria, Cyprus and Romania
- 11 August 2011: Israel
- 10 September 2012: Croatia
- 1 June 2014: Andorra and San Marino
- 1 January 2016: Chile
- 1 August 2016: Brunei (effective until 31 July 2026) (resumed) and Thailand (extension) (effective until 31 July 2026)
- 1 December 2016: Brunei Certificate of Identity
- 12 July 2017: Belize, Dominican Republic, El Salvador (cancelled since 12 December 2018), Guatemala, Haiti (cancelled since 13 February 2026), Honduras, Nicaragua (cancelled since 10 March 2026), Paraguay, Saint Vincent and the Grenadines, Saint Kitts and Nevis, Saint Lucia
- 1 November 2017: Philippines (effective until 31 July 2026)
- 21 May 2018: North Macedonia (effective until 31 March 2030)
- 1 June 2018: Nauru (cancelled since 1 May 2026), Tuvalu
- 6 September 2018: Russia (effective until 31 July 2022)
- 19 November 2018: Marshall Islands
- 1 December 2018: Palau
- 1 June 2019: Eswatini
- 1 December 2024: Albania, Kosovo
- 1 May 2026: Oman

Cancelled:

- 1 December 1994: Brunei (was resumed in 2016)
- March 2010: Costa Rica (was applied from 1 January 1998)
- 12 December 2018: El Salvador (was applied from 12 July 2017)
- 1 August 2022: Russia (was applied from 6 September 2018)
- 13 February 2026: Haiti (was applied from 12 July 2017, resumed between 2−31 March 2026)
- 10 March 2026: Nicaragua (was applied from 12 July 2017)
- 1 April 2026: Haiti (was applied from 2 March 2026)
- 1 May 2026: Nauru (was applied from 1 June 2018)

Visa on arrival

- 15 May 2013: Turkey (cancelled in January 2026)

e-Visa

- 12 January 2016: Belize (visa-free from 12 July 2017), Brunei (visa-free from 1 August 2016), Burkina Faso (cancelled), Colombia (cancelled), Dominican Republic (visa-free from 12 July 2017), Ecuador, El Salvador (cancelled), Eswatini (visa-free since Jun 1 2019), Guatemala (visa-free from 12 July 2017), Haiti, Honduras (visa-free from 12 July 2017), Kiribati (cancelled), Marshall Islands (visa-free from 19 November 2018), Mauritius, Nauru (cancelled), Nicaragua (cancelled), North Macedonia (visa-free from 21 May 2018), Palau (visa-free from 1 December 2018), Panama, Paraguay (visa-free from 12 July 2017), Peru, Saint Kitts and Nevis (visa-free from 12 July 2017), Saint Lucia (visa-free from 12 July 2017), Saint Vincent and the Grenadines (visa-free from 12 July 2017), São Tomé and Príncipe (cancelled), Solomon Islands (cancelled), Turkey, and Tuvalu (visa-free from 1 June 2018)
- 7 October 2016: Bahrain, Dominica, Kuwait, Montenegro, Oman (visa-free from 1 May 2026), Philippines (visa-free from 1 November 2017), Qatar, Saudi Arabia and the United Arab Emirates
- 20 November 2019: Bosnia and Herzegovina
- 30 March 2026: Armenia*, Colombia*, Kazakhstan*, Uzbekistan*(All conditional)
- 7 July 2026: Russia

=== APEC Business Travel Card ===
Holders of passports issued by the following countries who possess an APEC Business Travel Card (ABTC) containing the code "TWN" on the back of the card may enter Taiwan without a visa for business purposes for up to 90 days. ABTCs are issued to nationals of:

- Australia
- Brunei
- Chile
- Indonesia
- Japan
- South Korea
- Malaysia
- Mexico
- New Zealand
- Papua New Guinea
- Peru
- Philippines
- Russia
- Singapore
- Thailand
- Vietnam

ABTCs are also issued to nationals of China and permanent residents of Hong Kong; however, Chinese nationals residing in mainland China are subject to entry restrictions and cannot use the card to enter Taiwan. Chinese nationals permanently residing in Hong Kong are also ineligible and are required to obtain an Exit and Entry Permit.

== Visa on arrival ==
Holders of emergency or temporary passports with a validity of more than 6 months issued by visa-exempt countries are eligible for visa on arrival for a fee. The duration of stay is 30 days regardless of nationality and cannot be extended. This measure does not apply to holders of emergency or temporary passports issued by the United States as they are visa exempt.

Visa on arrival is only available at Taiwan Taoyuan International Airport. For passengers arriving at Taipei Songshan Airport, Kaohsiung International Airport or Taichung Airport, they would be issued a temporary entry permit and will have to apply for a visa at the Bureau of Consular Affairs (BOCA) headquarters in Taipei, any of the offices of Ministry of Foreign Affairs in Taiwan, or the BOCA office at Taiwan Taoyuan International Airport. Passengers without a visa will not be allowed to depart from Taiwan.

Any passenger arriving at a port of entry other than the one listed above will be denied entry.

== Electronic visa (e-Visa) ==
Since 12 January 2016, the Ministry of Foreign Affairs of ROC started to implement the e-Visa Program. Citizens of the following countries can apply for a single-entry e-Visa to visit Taiwan for less than 30 days. Unless mentioned otherwise, the fee for each application is NT$1,646. On 7 October 2016, the Ministry of Foreign Affairs of ROC further expanded the list of countries eligible to apply for an e-Visa.

- Armenia^{2 3}
- Bahrain
- Bosnia and Herzegovina
- Colombia^{2}
- Dominica
- Ecuador
- Haiti
- Kazakhstan^{2 3}
- Kuwait
- Mauritius
- Montenegro
- Oman
- Panama
- Peru
- Qatar
- Russia^{1 4}
- Saudi Arabia
- Turkey^{1}
- United Arab Emirates
- Uzbekistan^{2 3}

_{1 — Diplomatic, official and service passports are not eligible.}
_{2 — Must provide a valid visa or residence permit issued by any Schengen Area member state or the United States.}
_{3 — Effective until 31 March 2027.}
_{4 — Effective until 6 July 2027.}

Citizens of the following countries may apply for a single-entry e-Visa for a maximum stay of 30 days if they are visiting with travel agencies designated by the Tourism Administration, Ministry of Transportation and Communications:

- India
- Indonesia
- Laos
- Myanmar
- Vietnam

Also, all foreign nationals except Chinese nationals who are invited by the Taiwanese government to attend international conferences, sports events, trade fairs or other activities organized, co-organized or sponsored by Taiwanese government agencies or certain NGOs are also eligible for an e-Visa. Such applicants must obtain an e-code from their host organizations in Taiwan prior to applying for an e-Visa.

Citizens of the following countries are eligible for a business e-Visa if they have obtained recommendations from the local Taiwan External Trade Development Council since 1 June 2017.

- Bangladesh
- Bhutan
- India
- Iran
- Nepal
- Pakistan
- Sri Lanka

== Online Travel Authorization Certificate ==
Citizens of the following countries may apply for a no-fee Travel Authorization Certificate online for multiple visits to Taiwan, for a duration of no more than 14 days each visit during the certificate's 90-day validity period, if they have never been employed as a guest worker to Taiwan and have met the additional requirements listed below:

- India
- Indonesia
- Laos
- Myanmar
- Vietnam

They are required to hold a residential or visitor visa (including Visa Waiver Registration Certificates issued by Japan to Indonesian nationals, and e-Visas), or a residential certificate (including permanent residency) issued by the following countries. The visa can be either valid or expired, but it must not have expired for more than 10 years prior to the date of arrival in Taiwan. Holders of work permits as well as visas marked "void", "cancelled" or "cancelled without prejudice" are not eligible. In addition, travelers utilizing the scheme must also hold a return or onward plane or ship ticket and will be required to present it to the immigration officer.

- All European Union member states

- Australia^{2}
- Canada
- Iceland
- Japan^{3}
- Liechtenstein
- New Zealand^{2}
- Norway
- South Korea^{4}
- Switzerland
- Taiwan^{1}
- United Kingdom
- United States

_{1 – Excluding holders of entry visas bearing the remark FL (migrant worker), X (others), or P with “Special permission from MOFA” (visa and eVisa for “Project for Simplifying Visa Regulations for High-end Group Tourists from Southeast Asian Countries (Project Kuan-Hong)” ever issued), as well as holders of resident cards with “migrant worker” (移工) as the purpose of residence.}
_{2 – Requires electronic visa that is still valid by the date of arrival.}
_{3 – Requires visa or visa waiver (for Indonesian e-passport holders) together with proof of record of entering Japan or confirmed onward ticket to Japan.}
_{4 – requires visa together with proof of record of entering South Korea.}

Frequent visitors to Taiwan from these countries can also receive multiple entry visas with validity of two to five years.

From 1 June 2017, nationals of these countries who have received a Taiwanese visa (other than a work visa) in the last 10 years are eligible for online registration.

As all Filipino nationals were exempt from visa requirements on 1 November 2017, they were no longer able to register for the certificate from that day onwards. All certificates were also no longer valid for entry since 31 October 2017. Passengers entering Taiwan prior to 1 November 2017 were still allowed to stay for up to 30 days, while those entering Taiwan on or after that day can only stay for up to 14 days.

The period of stay for nationals of all countries was shortened from 30 days to 14 days from 1 August 2018.

Based on the long-term pro China stance of the Cambodian government, which often makes derogatory remarks about Taiwan, and the rampant fraud that has caused many Taiwanese people to suffer, the Taiwanese government announced the cancellation of conditional visa free travel for Cambodian citizens to Taiwan on August 1, 2026.

== Permanent residents of Hong Kong and Macau of Chinese nationality ==
Permanent residents of Hong Kong and/or Macau may be eligible for an Exit & Entry Permit upon arrival for NT$300 or may apply for an Entry Permit online at no cost to visit Taiwan for less than 30 days.

The requirements are

- They were born in Hong Kong or Macau
- They were born outside Hong Kong or Macau and have entered Taiwan at least once as a permanent resident of Hong Kong or Macau and:
  - their last visit was in 1983 or later and thus recorded in the National Immigration Agency computer system; or
  - their last visit was before 1983 and they hold the travel document used for that visit; or
  - their last visit was before 1983 and they have first obtained proof of previous entry from the NIA
- They hold one of the following travel documents with remaining validity of no less than 3 months at the time of arrival:
  - Hong Kong Special Administrative Region passport
  - British National (Overseas) passport
  - Macao Special Administrative Region passport;
- They do not hold passports issued by other nations or have additional nationalities (including other classes of British nationality). If they do, they are required to comply with visa requirements of their additional nationalities, except for Hong Kong residents who are allowed to have dual Chinese nationality and British National (Overseas) status (but not full British citizenship), and except for Macau residents who are allowed to have dual Chinese and Portuguese nationality (but only for Portuguese nationality obtained before the handover).
- Macau residents using a Portuguese passport may enter visa-free for 90 days, like any other Portuguese passport holder, and do not need to apply for a permit beforehand.

First time applicants not born in Hong Kong or Macau are also able to apply for Exit and Entry Permit online from 8 February 2017. Unlike those qualified for the no-fee Entry Permit or Entry and Exit Permit on arrival, the applicants are required to pay a processing fee of NT$600. The processing time is 5 business days. These visitors are required to hold their Hong Kong Permanent Identity Cards or Macau Permanent Resident Identity Cards, as well as their proof of previous visits to Taiwan, when applying for Exit and Entry Permits on arrival or the no-fee Entry Permits for subsequent visits.

Since 1 January 2017, Hong Kong and Macau residents are able to apply for double-entry Entry Permits online, providing that they are entering Taiwan by cruise for at least one portion of their trip.

== Mainland Chinese travellers ==
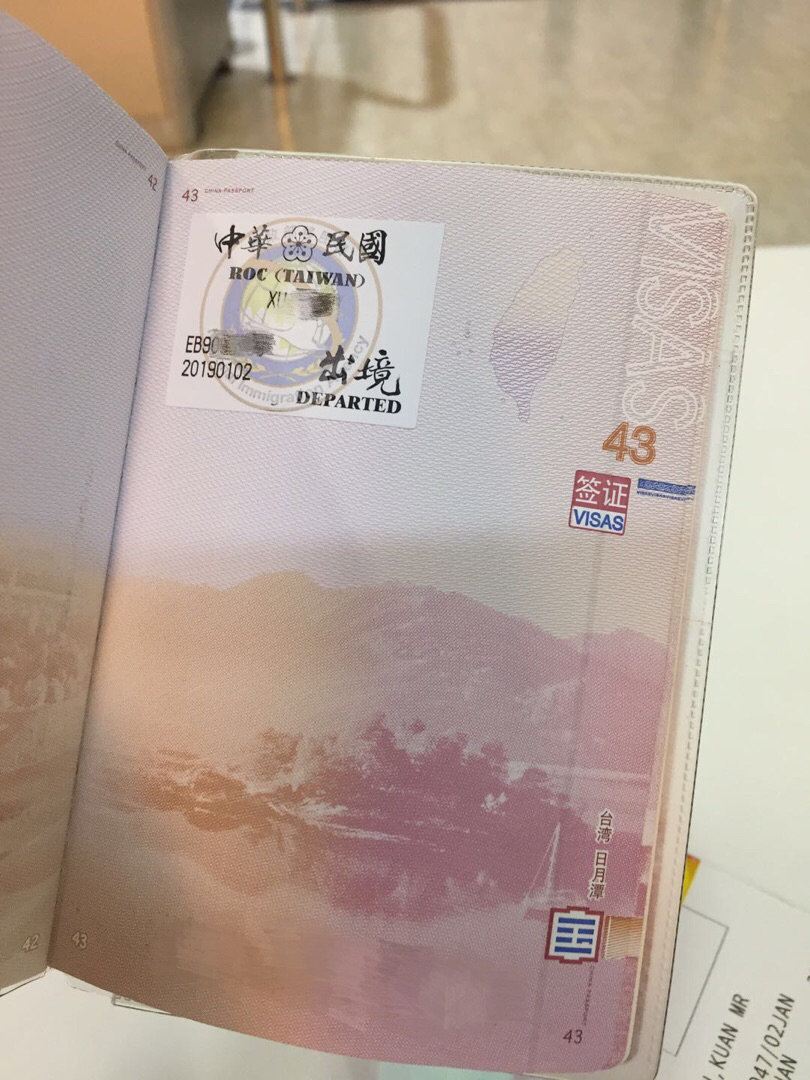
A Taiwan departed stamp sticker on page 43 (Taiwan page) of biometric Chinese passport.

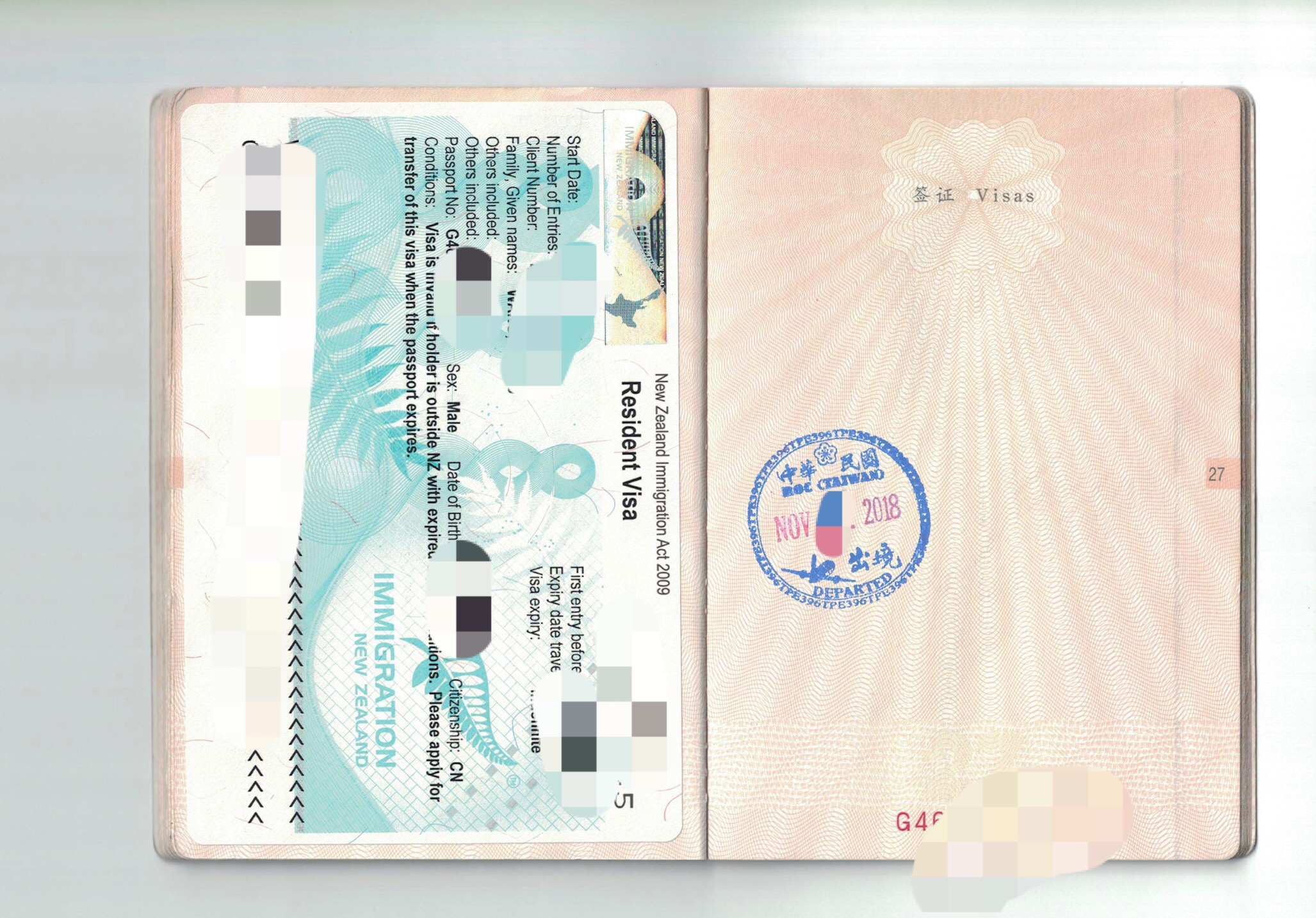
A Taiwan departed stamp on page 27 of non-biometric Chinese passport. Documents issued by mainland China authorities will normally not be stamped as per the One-China policy.

Chinese nationals with residency (hukou) in mainland China (including those who are non-permanent residents of Hong Kong or Macau and have relinquished their hukou in mainland China) require prior approvals from the Taiwanese government and are required to hold an Exit & Entry Permit Taiwan Republic of China (de facto e-visa) prior to traveling to Taiwan. As of October 2024, citizens of mainland China cannot visit the Taiwan Area for tourism unless they qualify for one of the exemptions:

- They reside outside mainland China and hold temporary or permanent residence status in Hong Kong, Macau or a third country (prior approval from the Chinese authorities is not required when departing from a place other than mainland China); or,
- They are residents of Fujian or Shanghai, and they only visit Kinmen and Matsu (an endorsement on the Taiwan Travel Permit is obtainable).

When departing from mainland China (other than the airports of Chongqing, Nanchang or Kunming), all citizens of mainland China cannot travel to Taiwan on their passports and must hold a Taiwan Travel Permit (往來台灣通行證), colloquially known as Mainland Resident Travel Permit (大通證), issued by the mainland Chinese authorities. The current card-type version of the permit is similar to the design of the Two-way permit while older version is a pink, passport-like travel document. Permits must have the appropriate valid exit endorsements (similar to exit visas) on them for the holder to depart from mainland China. As of October 2024, an endorsement for tourism cannot be obtained other than Chinese residents of Fujian or Shanghai travelling to Kinmen and Matsu.Travelling with the Taiwan Travel Permit is not required nor useful when departing from Hong Kong, Macau or a third country.

Since January 2016, Mainland residents are no longer required to hold a Mainland Resident Travel Permit if they depart from airports in Chongqing, Kunming or Nanchang and are only in transit through Taiwan to a third country. Otherwise, the Mainland Resident Travel Permit with exit endorsement is also required for transit through Taiwan if departing from mainland China, but the Exit and Entry Permit is not required if the passengers do not pass immigration control in Taiwan and only remain airside.

From 28 March 2017, citizens of mainland China are able to apply for the Exit and Entry Permit online if they are residing in a third country.

== Taiwan Employment Gold Card ==
In 2018, the passing of the "Act for Recruitment and Employment of Foreign Professionals" created the Taiwan Employment Gold Card. In addition to being a visa, the Gold Card contains an open work permit and residence permit allowing a holder to reside and work in Taiwan for up to 3 years. All foreign nationals, including permanent residents from Hong Kong and Macao, are eligible to apply. The card aims to attract experienced professionals in the fields of Science and Technology, Education, Culture and Arts, Sport, Law, Architecture, and others beneficial to Taiwan's economy. Applicants must pass a skill qualification procedure involving the submission of documents to validate their claims.

== Employment Seeking Visa ==
Also created with the passing of the "Act for Recruitment and Employment of Foreign Professionals" in 2018, was the Employment Seeking Visa. The Employment Seeking Visa allows applicants with work experience having a salary more than double the minimum wage in Taiwan (a salary of more than NT$47,971 in 2020), and those who just graduated from a "Top 500" university to acquire a six-month multi-entry visitor visa.

== Special visa requirements for nationals of certain countries ==
Taiwan has special entry requirements for nationals of certain countries. Nationals of countries mentioned below may only visit Taiwan when one of the following requirements is met:

- They are invited by Taiwanese government agencies when on official businesses.
- They are participating in international meetings or activities for the purposes of "religious, athletic, or cultural exchange" and invited by a Taiwanese organization.
- They have dependents with legal residence status in Taiwan (spouse, family members of "lineal relationship", or siblings only).
- They are "conducting economic or commercial businesses" in Taiwan. Accompanied spouse and children may also receive visitor visas.
- They are crew members boarding a ship docked in Taiwan.
- They are receiving medical treatment in Taiwan.

In addition, those who are visiting Taiwan on business must be interviewed by a Taiwanese consular officer, and their sponsors in Taiwan must submit a guarantee to the Bureau of Consular Affairs in Taiwan.

Countries marked with * may also apply for tourist visas, and they are not required to submit a guarantee from their Taiwanese sponsors when applying for business visas.

The list of the countries is as follows:

- Afghanistan
- Algeria
- Bangladesh
- Bhutan^{*}
- Cameroon
- Gambia
- Ghana
- Iraq
- Nepal
- Niger
- Nigeria
- Pakistan
- Senegal
- Somalia
- Sri Lanka^{*}
- Syria

In addition, the requirements also apply to holders of Indian Identity Certificates.

== Working Holiday Visa ==
As of 2024, nationals of the following 18 countries are eligible to apply for the Taiwanese working holiday visa (named as "Youth Mobility Scheme" for British and Canadian citizens) through Taiwanese diplomatic missions of their countries of nationality, if they are ordinary residents in their country of nationality and are within the age limits.

- Australia
- Austria
- Belgium
- Canada
- Czech Republic
- France
- Germany
- Hungary
- Ireland
- Israel
- Japan
- Luxembourg
- Netherlands
- New Zealand
- Poland
- Slovakia
- South Korea
- United Kingdom^{1}

_{1 – for British citizens residing in United Kingdom only.}

== Visitor statistics ==
Most visitors arriving in Taiwan on short-term basis were from the following countries of residence:

Country	2017	2016	2015	2014	2013
China	2,732,549	3,511,734	4,184,102	3,987,152	2,874,702
Japan	1,898,854	1,895,702	1,627,229	1,634,790	1,421,550
Hong Kong	1,540,765	1,474,521	1,389,529	1,276,039	1,105,223
South Korea	1,054,708	884,397	658,757	527,684	351,301
United States	561,365	523,888	479,452	458,691	414,060
Malaysia	528,019	474,420	431,481	439,240	394,326
Singapore	425,577	407,267	393,037	376,235	364,733
Vietnam	383,329	196,636	146,380	137,177	118,467
Thailand	292,534	195,640	124,409	104,812	104,138
Philippines	290,784	172,475	139,217	136,978	99,698
Indonesia	189,631	188,720	177,743	182,704	171,299
Total	10,739,601	10,690,279	10,439,785	9,910,204	8,016,280

== See also ==
- Exit & Entry Permit
- Foreign relations of Taiwan
- Taiwan passport
- Visa requirements for Taiwanese citizens
