= Entry & Exit Permit for Taiwan =

Taiwanese visa for Chinese citizens

Exit & Entry Permit Taiwan Republic of China
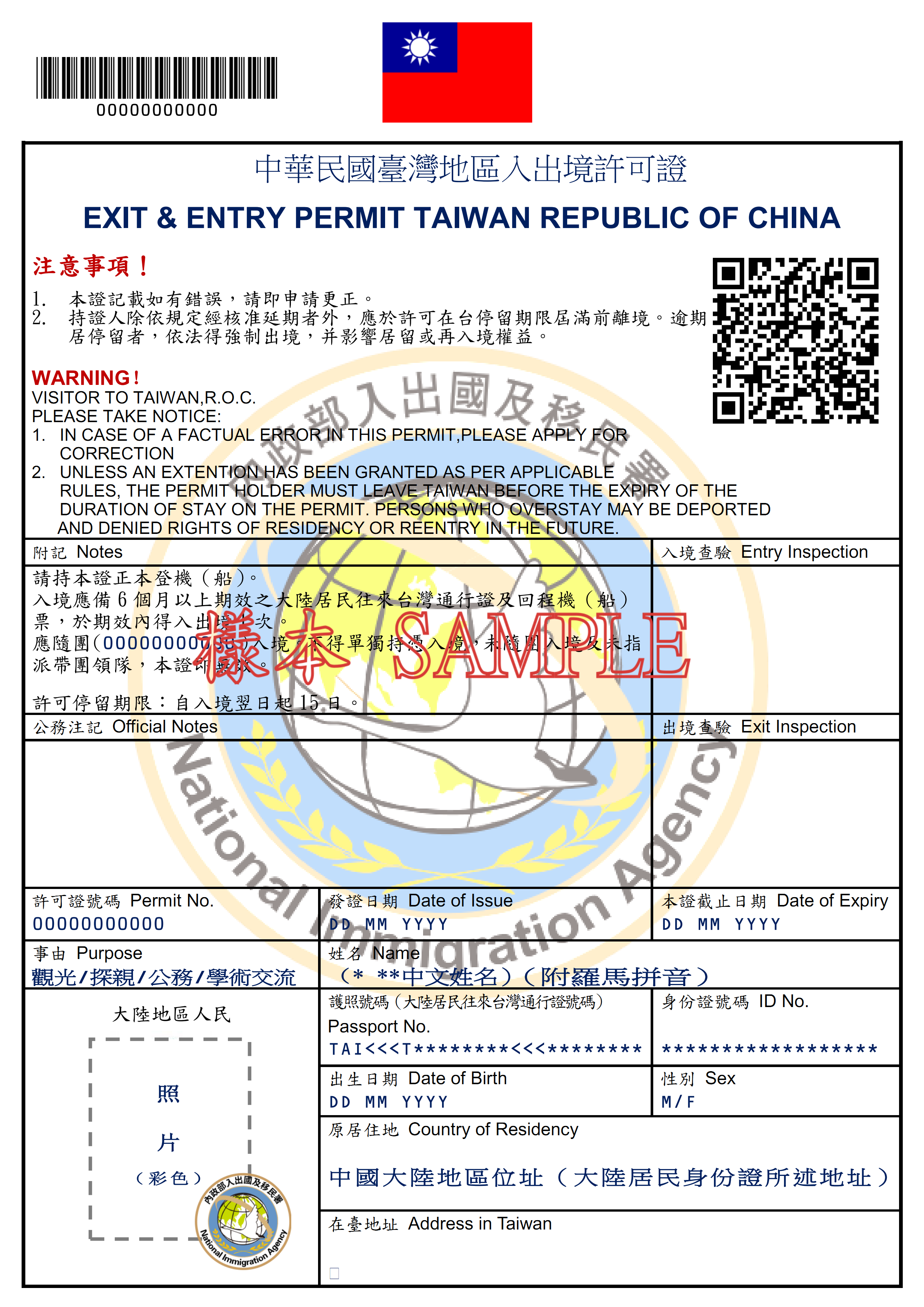
- Sample of the permit
- Type: Entry permit
- Issued by: (Taiwan) National Immigration Agency
- Purpose: Entering the Taiwan Area
- Eligibility: Chinese citizens from mainland, Hong Kong, and Macau
- Expiration: 15 days to 3 years

Entry & Exit Permit for Taiwan
- Traditional Chinese: 中華民國臺灣地區 入出境許可證
- Simplified Chinese: 中华民国台湾地区 入出境许可证
Transcriptions
Standard Mandarin
- Hanyu Pinyin: Zhōnghuá Mínguó Táiwān dìqū rùchūjìng xǔkězhèng
- Bopomofo: ㄓㄨㄥ ㄏㄨㄚ´ ㄇㄧㄣ´ ㄍㄨㄛ´ ㄊㄞ´ ㄨㄢ ㄉㄧ` ㄑㄩ ㄖㄨ` ㄔㄨ ㄐㄧㄥ` ㄒㄩˇ ㄎㄜˇ ㄓㄥ`
- Wade–Giles: Chung¹-hua² Min²-kuo² T′ai²-wan¹ ti⁴-ch′ü¹ ju⁴-ch′u¹-ching⁴ hsü³-k′o³-chêng⁴

Taiwan Entry Permit (for Mainland China, Hong Kong, Macau)
- Traditional Chinese: 入臺證
- Simplified Chinese: 入台证
Transcriptions
Standard Mandarin
- Hanyu Pinyin: Rùtáizhèng
- Bopomofo: ㄖㄨ` ㄊㄞ´ ㄓㄥ`
- Wade–Giles: Ju⁴-t′ai²-chêng⁴

Kinmen-Matsu Permit (for Kinmen, Matsu and Penghu)
- Traditional Chinese: 金馬證
- Simplified Chinese: 金马证
Transcriptions
Standard Mandarin
- Hanyu Pinyin: Jīnmǎzhèng
- Bopomofo: ㄐㄧㄣ ㄇㄚˇ ㄓㄥ`
- Wade–Giles: Chin¹-ma³-chêng⁴

The Taiwan Entry Permit, formally the Exit & Entry Permit Taiwan Republic of China, is an entry permit issued by the National Immigration Agency in Taiwan for Chinese citizens from mainland, Hong Kong, and Macau to enter and exit the Taiwan Area.

The permit is an e-document that needed to be color-printed on an A4 paper. Despite its name, the permit must be used in conjunction with a valid travel document when entering Taiwan, as the permit itself is not a travel document.

== History ==
Prior to the handover of Hong Kong and Macau, the permit was a passport-like booklet, with the flag of the Republic of China imprinted on the cover. Holders of PRC passports, ROC passports or any travel documents not issued by Hong Kong or Macau were not eligible for the permit.

When Hong Kong was under British rule, holders of British Dependent Territories citizen and British National (Overseas) passports were required to apply for the permit to visit Taiwan, but British citizens were eligible for visa-free access. The permit was also required for holders of the Hong Kong Certificate of Identity. Prior to 1997, the permit had to be applied for at the Chung Hwa Travel Service in Hong Kong or the Taipei Trade and Tourism Office in Macau. Since the handovers of sovereignty, the application procedures have been eased over time. Since 2010, Hong Kong and Macau residents can apply for the simplified Entry Permit without fee charges and can be approved instantly, or they can use the permit-on-arrival service.

As travelling to Taiwan for tourism purposes was not legalized until 2008 for Mainland residents, very few of the permits were issued before then. Since then, travel restrictions for mainland Chinese have been gradually lifted by the Taiwanese government, although a quota system remained in place.

Before the Beijing authority stopped issuing endorsements for tourism on Taiwan Travel Permit, mainland Chinese nationals who applied from mainland China were subject to the quota set forth by the ROC and PRC governments. As of May 2016, mainland Chinese nationals visitors applying from mainland China were subject to a daily quota imposed by the ROC of 14,600 persons per day, with half of the quota available to individual tour applicants. It was reported that the Beijing authorities also had an unofficial "soft cap" on the numbers of individual and group tourists, ranging from 40% to 50% of the ROC quota. If the daily quota was met, then subsequent applications would no longer be processed until the day with sufficient spaces was reached. In contrast, mainland Chinese nationals who held permanent or non-permanent residence status in a third country or region (including Hong Kong and Macau) were not subject to the quota.

In August 2019, the Beijing authority again banned mainland Chinese nationals from travelling to Taiwan for individual tourism purposes. Travelling to Kinmen, Matsu, and Taiwan (as group tourists) has also been suspended since early 2020 when the COVID-19 pandemic began. In September 2023, the ROC authority allowed the mainland Chinese citizens residing in Hong Kong, Macao and overseas to apply for a Taiwan Entry Permit with no quota system.

== Eligibility ==
=== Residents in Hong Kong and Macau ===
For residents in Hong Kong and Macau, only holders of HKSAR, MSAR and BN(O) passports with no other travel documents issued by any other country (thereby excludes anyone with multiple citizenship, except persons with both BN(O) and HKSAR passports) are eligible for the permit. Under Taiwanese law, those with nationality or citizenship in another country are no longer considered as "residents in Hong Kong and Macau" and must comply with the visa requirements of their non-Chinese (or BN(O)) nationality or citizenship. For example, a resident in Hong Kong with both HKSAR and British citizen passports must use their British citizen passport to enter Taiwan. Likewise, a resident in Macau with both MSAR and Portuguese passports will need to use the Portuguese one as well. Those with HKSAR, MSAR or BN(O) passports who also have nationalities or passports from a non-visa-exempt country (e.g., Brazil) are required to apply for a Taiwanese visa.

Unlike most Chinese residents, residents in Hong Kong and Macau are not subject to a daily quota of this permit regardless of place of application.

=== Mainland Chinese nationals ===
Since September 2023, mainland Chinese nationals who hold permanent or non-permanent residence status in a third country or region (including Hong Kong and Macau) are eligible to apply for a Taiwan Entry Permit online.

The National Immigration Agency of the Republic of China allows mainland Chinese nationals to obtain a Taiwan Entry Permit on arrival provided that they only stay in Kinmen, Matsu and Penghu, hold certain documents, and depart from and arrive at specific ports by boat. However, the Beijing authority only allows mainland Chinese nationals who are residents of Fujian to travel to Matsu.

Although Chinese residents automatically lose their Chinese nationality when they acquire nationality or citizenship of another country (unlike Hong Kong and Macau, which have special exemptions to this rule), Chinese residents who reside outside China for less than four years will need to apply for the permit to visit Taiwan before they can comply with the visa requirements of their country of citizenship. An example is those who acquired citizenship or nationality through one of the Immigrant investor programs, as these programs normally do not require lengthy physical residence in the country before granting citizenship.

== Application ==
=== Online application for Hong Kong and Macau residents ===
Since 2017, persons who were not born in Hong Kong or Macau and are visiting Taiwan for the first time since they became residents of Hong Kong or Macau can apply for the permit online. From 1 July 2017, it is no longer possible to apply in person at the Taipei Economic and Cultural Office in Hong Kong or Macau. After they have entered Taiwan for the first time with the permit, they are eligible for the simplified online Entry Permit or can alternatively obtain the Exit and Entry Permit on arrival.

Those who were born in Hong Kong or Macau are not required to apply for the permit for tourism purposes. Instead, they are automatically eligible for the no-fee Entry Permit or the permit-on-arrival service by virtue of being born in Hong Kong or Macau.

=== Application procedures for Mainland Chinese nationals ===
Chinese nationals with hukou in mainland China (including those who are non-permanent residents of Hong Kong or Macau and have relinquished their hukou in mainland China) face restrictions placed by ROC and PRC governments when applying for the permit. As of October 2024, citizens of mainland China cannot visit the Taiwan Area for tourism unless they qualify for one of the exemptions:

- They reside outside mainland China and hold temporary or permanent residence status in Hong Kong, Macau or a third country (prior approval from the Beijing authorities is not required when departing from a place other than mainland China and Taiwan Entry Permit can be applied online); or,
- They are residents of Fujian and they only visit Matsu (an endorsement on the Taiwan Travel Permit is obtainable and a 15-day Taiwan Entry Permit can be obtained on arrival provided holding certain travel documents).

All Mainland China residents cannot travel to Taiwan on their passports when departing from mainland China and must hold a Taiwan Travel Permit (往來台灣通行證) issued by the mainland Chinese authorities. Before 2017, it was a pink, passport-like travel document; the current permit is an ICAO Doc 9303 TD1 card with an embedded biometric chip. The Taiwan Travel Permit must be used along with the appropriate exit endorsements (similar to exit visas). Travelling with the Taiwan Travel Permit is not required nor useful when departing from Hong Kong, Macau or a third country.

Exit & Entry Permit is not required for mainland Chinese travelers holding a Chinese passport transiting through Taoyuan International Airport on the same calendar day, as long as the traveler does not leave the sterile area of the airport. However, a Taiwan Travel Permit and valid endorsement except for group tourism is required unless that passenger departs from Hong Kong, Macao, overseas or the mainland ports of Chongqing, Nanchang, or Kunming for Taiwan, even if not leaving the sterile area.

== Issues ==
=== Stamps ===
The ROC government does not stamp either Chinese, BN(O), HKSAR or MSAR passports, or Mainland Resident Travel Permits (although the passports and permits themselves are routinely inspected as would any other passports). The ROC does not recognize British National (Overseas) status as a form of British nationality under its law.

=== Consular Protection for BN(O) passport holders ===
Although BN(O) status is not recognized by the ROC as a form of British nationality, the British Government has indicated that it provides the same consular assistance for BN(O) passport holders as other British nationals, with the exception of BN(O) holders who are ethnic Chinese and physically in mainland China, Hong Kong or Macau. Thus, the British Government does not indicate that BN(O)s travelling to ROC cannot enjoy British consular protection. This implies that BN(O)s do enjoy British consular protection in Taiwan, even though the status is not officially recognized by the ROC.

== Gallery ==
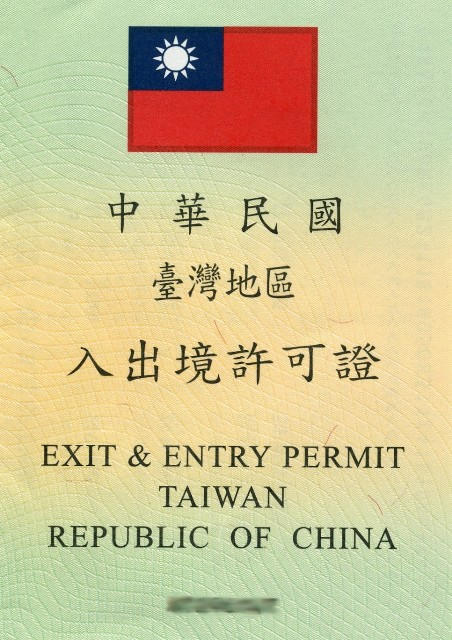
Cover of the previous version of a single-entry permit.

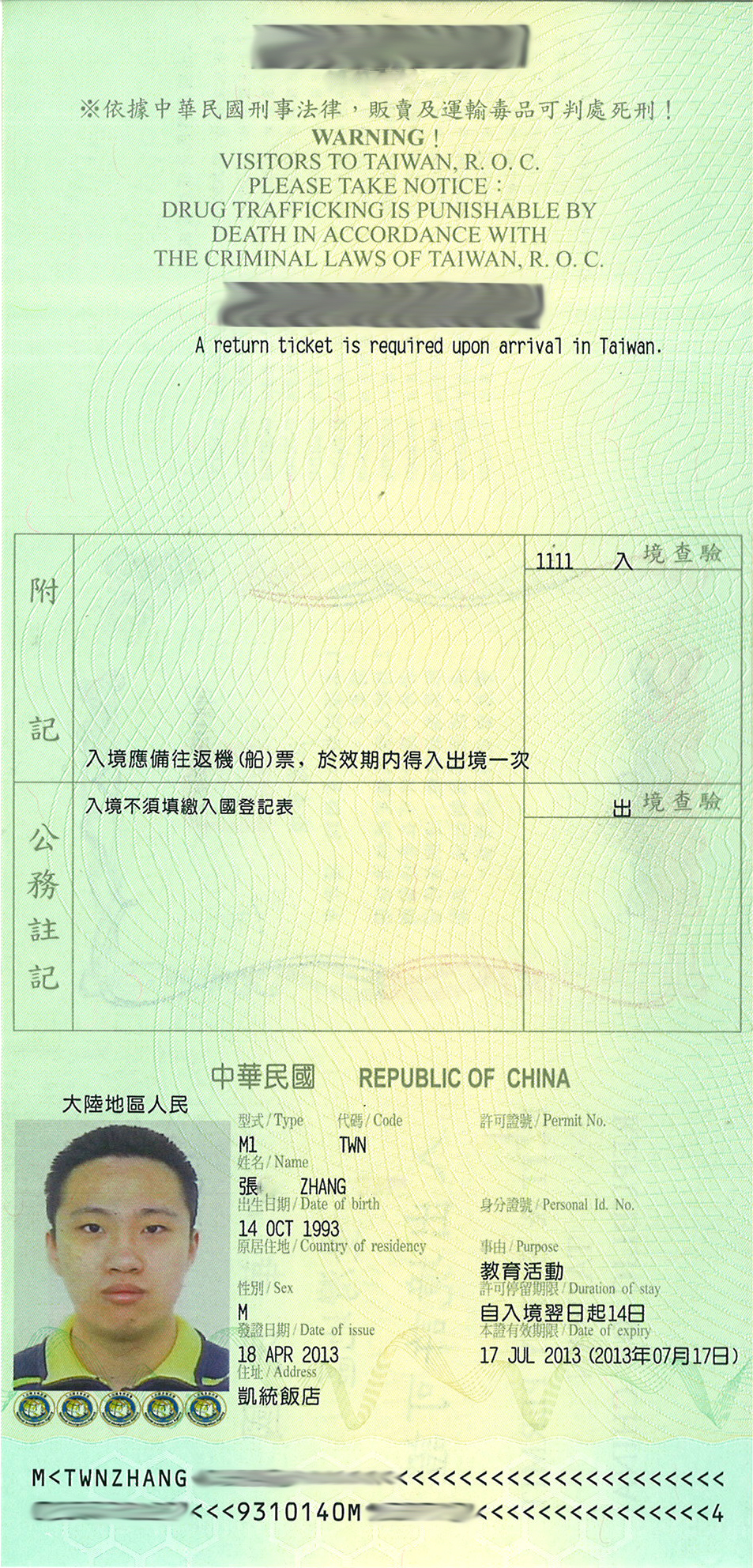
Interior of the previous version of a single-entry permit.

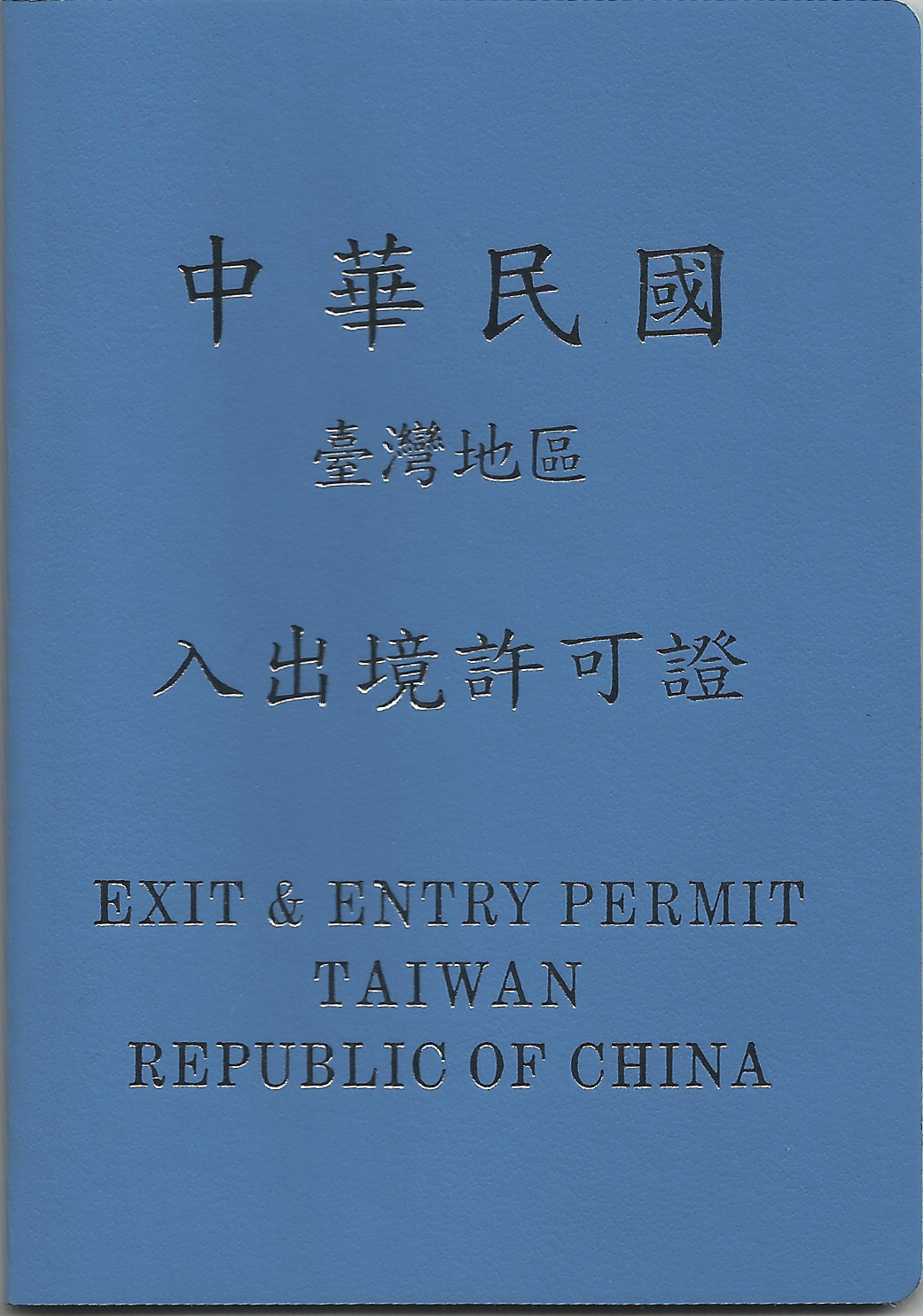
Cover of a booklet type multiple-entry permit.

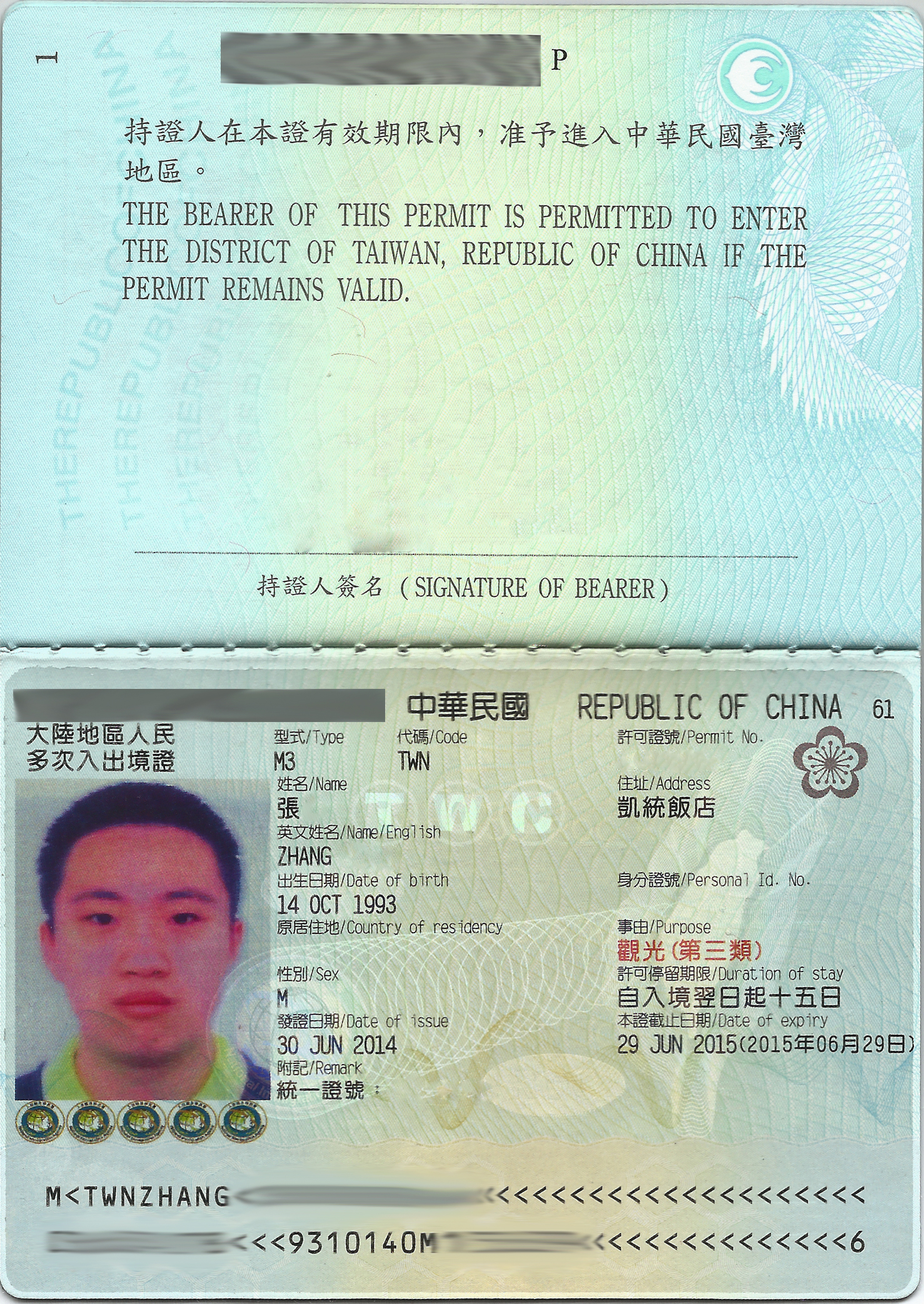
Data page of a booklet type multiple-entry permit issued to an oversea mainland Chinese citizen.

== See also ==
- Mainland Travel Permit for Taiwan Residents
- Visa policy of Taiwan
