= Taiwan Travel Permit =

Chinese travel document to travel to Taiwan

Taiwan Travel Permit 往来台湾通行证
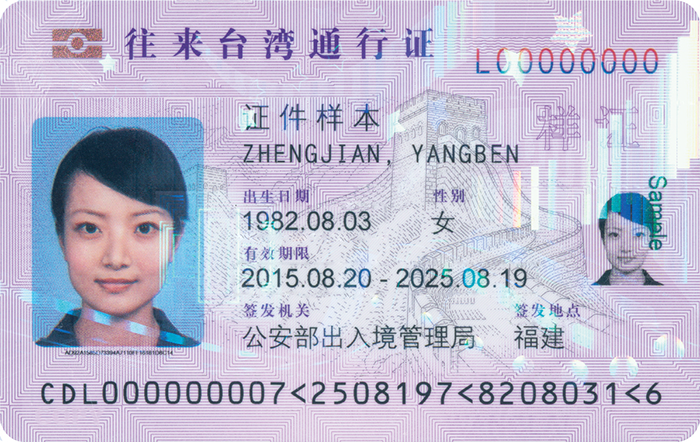
- Card-style permit in 2015
- Type: Travel Document
- Issued by: Exit and Entry Administration of the People's Republic of China
- Purpose: Exit the immigration checkpoint when travelling to the Taiwan Area from the mainland
- Eligibility: mainland Chinese citizens
- Expiration: 5 years (for applicants under 16 years old); 10 years (for applicants above 16 years old)
- Cost: ¥60

The Taiwan Travel Permit (Note: "Taiwan Travel Permit" is the official English name used by the Chinese government for this document.) is a travel document issued by the Exit and Entry Administration of the People's Republic of China. This card-size biometric document is issued for its bearers, Chinese citizens residing in the mainland, to travel from the mainland to the Taiwan Area for personal, business, or other purposes.

When bearers travel to the Taiwan Area from ports in mainland China (besides Chongqing, Nanchang or Kunming), they need to have an endorsement (similar to exit visa) on their Taiwan Travel Permit cards. In addition, mainland Chinese citizens, regardless of whether they have such a document, need a Taiwan Entry Permit to enter the Taiwan Area. Mainland Chinese citizens do not need to have a Taiwan Travel Permit if they are traveling to Taiwan directly from overseas, Hong Kong, Macao or the mainland ports of Chongqing, Nanchang or Kunming.

The Association for Tourism Exchange Across the Taiwan Straits suspended the pilot program for individual travel to Taiwan by mainland residents from 47 cities on 1 August 2019. Mainland Chinese residents in Fujian can apply for an endorsement for traveling to Matsu for tourism since August 2024. In August 2024, Taiwanese politician Cho Jung-tai stated that the mainland government has not yet approved mainland tour groups or tourists to visit Taiwan.
