= Driving license in Japan =

In Japan, a driving license (運転免許, Unten menkyo) is required when operating a car, motorcycle or moped on public roads. Driving licenses are issued by the prefectural governments' public safety commissions and are overseen on a nationwide basis by the National Police Agency.

== Types of license ==
Japanese licenses are divided by experience level and by vehicle type.

=== Classes ===
| Name | Japanese | Description |
|---|---|---|
| Provisional license | 仮運転免許 | Issued to a new driver undergoing training for their Class 1 or Class 2 license. Requires the driver to display learner's black-on-white plates on the exterior of the vehicle, and to be accompanied by a Class 2 holder or 3-year experienced Class 1 license holder supervising while driving. This license expires unless a learner driver gains a Class 1 or Class 2 license within six months. |
| Class 1 license | 第一種運転免許 | License for operating a vehicle. |
| Class 2 licenses | 第二種運転免許 | Required when operating a commercial passenger-carrying vehicle such as a taxi or bus. Driver must be 21 years of age or older and have at least three years of experience driving under a Class 1 ordinary vehicle/heavy special vehicle license (relaxed to two years for members of the Japan Self-Defense Forces. One year and 19 years old by certain lesson in driving school). |

=== Categories ===
The vehicle classes are as follows:

| Name | Japanese | Description |
|---|---|---|
| Large vehicle | 大型自動車 | Any vehicle which weighs 11,000 kg or more in total, has maximum capacity of 6,500 kg or more, or carries 30 or more people, and is not classified as special vehicle, motorcycle or moped. |
| Medium vehicle | 中型自動車 | Any vehicle which weighs between 7,500 kg and 11,000 kg in total, has a maximum capacity between 4,500 kg and 7,500 kg, or carries 11 to 29 people, and is not classified as heavy vehicle, special vehicle, motorcycle or moped. |
| Semi-Medium vehicle | 準中型自動車 | Any vehicle which weighs between 3,500 kg and 7,500 kg in total, has a maximum capacity between 2,000 kg and 4,500 kg, and is not classified as heavy vehicle, medium vehicle, special vehicle, motorcycle or moped. |
| Ordinary vehicle | 普通自動車 | Any motorised vehicle which is not classified as heavy vehicle, medium vehicle, semi-medium vehicle, special vehicle, motorcycle or moped. |
| Large special vehicle | 大型特殊自動車 | Specialised automotive equipment such as tractors or cranes which are used for particular work and are not classified as small special vehicles. |
| Small special vehicle | 小型特殊自動車 | Specialized automotive equipment with a maximum speed of 15 km/h or less and no larger than 4.7m × 1.7m × 2.8m. |
| Large motorcycle | 大型自動二輪車 | Any motorcycle including a sidecar with a power exceeding 20 Kw (400cc for engine displacement), and is not classified as special vehicle. |
| Ordinary motorcycle | 普通自動二輪車 | Any motorcycle including a sidecar, and is not classified as special vehicle, heavy motorcycle or moped. |
| Moped | 原動機付自転車 | Any motorcycle with a power 0.6Kw or less (50cc or less for engine displacement), or motorized quadricycle which is not larger than 2.5m x 1.3m x 2.0m with a power 0.25Kw or less(20cc or less for engine displacement). |

Starting 1st July, 2023, moped with no larger than 1.9m length and 0.6m width, 0.25Kw or less electric motor, no exceeding 20km/h, cannot be changed maximum speed while driving, no clutch operation, has maximum speed indication signal, won't be needed to drive by license holder. (Registration requirement for any moped is continued.)

The "restricted to automatic" license (AT限定免許) can be issued for Medium Vehicle, ordinary vehicle (both including Class 2 license), Semi-Medium vehicle, ordinary motorcycle and heavy motorcycle license classes. The "restricted to small motorcycle" license (小型二輪免許 1.0Kw/125cc or less) can be issued for ordinary motorcycle license class, and can be issued along with the "restricted to automatic" license.

The restricted to automatic license will be able to be issued for Large Vehicle license starting 1st April, 2027, and for Class 2 Large Vehicle license starting 1st October 2027.

==== Vehicle Type Ratings ====
The vehicle type ratings are as follows:

| Type of Class 1 license | | Vehicle types allowed to drive | | | | | | | | | Minimum age |
| Type of Class 1 license | | Vehicle (自動車) | | | | Special vehicle (特殊自動車) | | Motorcycle (自動二輪車) | | Moped (原動機付自転車) | Minimum age |
| Type of Class 1 license | | Heavy (大型) | Medium (中型) | Semi-Med (準中型) | Ordinary (普通) | Large (大型) | Small (小型) | Large (大型) | Ordinary (普通) | Moped (原動機付自転車) | Minimum age |
| Vehicle license (自動車免許) | Large (大型) | Permitted | Permitted | Permitted | Permitted | | Permitted | | | Permitted | 21* |
| Vehicle license (自動車免許) | Medium (中型) | | Permitted | Permitted | Permitted | | Permitted | | | Permitted | 20* |
| Vehicle license (自動車免許) | Semi-Med (準中型) | | | Permitted | Permitted | | Permitted | | | Permitted | 18 |
| Vehicle license (自動車免許) | Ordinary (普通) | | | | Permitted | | Permitted | | | Permitted | 18 |
| Special vehicle license (特殊自動車免許) | Large (大型) | | | | | Permitted | Permitted | | | Permitted | 18 |
| Special vehicle license (特殊自動車免許) | Small (小型) | | | | | | Permitted | | | | 16 |
| Motorcycle license (自動二輪車免許) | Large (大型) | | | | | | Permitted | Permitted | Permitted | Permitted | 18 |
| Motorcycle license (自動二輪車免許) | Ordinary (普通) | | | | | | Permitted | | Permitted | Permitted | 16 |
| Moped license (原動機付自転車免許) | | | | | | | | | | Permitted | 16 |
| Trailer license (牽引免許) | | Required to drive any heavy vehicle, medium vehicle, semi-medium vehicle, ordinary vehicle or heavy special vehicle, towing a trailer weighing more than 750 kg gross (other than when towing damaged vehicles). | | | | | | | | | 18 |

* The minimum requirement for heavy or medium vehicle license can be relaxed to 19 years old and one year experience under ordinary vehicle/heavy special vehicle license by certain lesson in driving school.

== Required training ==
There are two options for learners. Firstly, learners can attend a designated driving school. Graduates from a designated driving school do not need to sit the practical examination but they do need to sit the written examination. Secondly, learners can attend non-designated driving school or obtain practice through other means, in which case they must sit both the practical and written examinations. The Japanese driving examination consists of a written examination and a practical examination for each level of license. Most Japanese go to a driving school prior to taking these examinations (though it is not required), and upon completing the course at a non-designated driving school must register for the examinations in the prefecture where they are registered as a resident. The practical examination consists of driving a vehicle through a purpose-designed driving course while obeying relevant rules of the road.

Japan also allows Japan-resident holders of foreign driving licenses to convert their foreign license to a Japanese license through an abbreviated examination process. This consists of an eyesight test and, depending on the issuing country of the foreign license, may also require a short written examination and a practical examination.

Countries exempt from the exam include, as of 2022: Iceland, Ireland, parts of the United States (limited to only the states of Ohio, Virginia, Hawaii, Maryland and Washington), United Kingdom, Italy, Australia, Austria, Netherlands, Canada, South Korea, Greece, Switzerland, Sweden, Spain, Slovenia, Czech Republic, Denmark, Germany, New Zealand, Norway, Hungary, Finland, France, Belgium, Poland, Portugal, Monaco, Luxembourg, and Taiwan.

In 2003, the first-time pass rate for Americans was slightly higher than the 35 percent pass rate for Japanese returnees, but not much. On the other hand, for those who took the regular test, they had to go through an intensive (and expensive) driver education program. The first time pass rate for this group, even with the harder test, was 90 to 100 percent. As of 2022, the fee for an English-speaking foreigner to obtain a license from a Japanese driving school is about ¥500,000 (or about US$4556).

== Driving license card ==
Every licensed driver is issued with a driving license card (運転免許証, Unten Menkyo Shou), which they are required to have available for inspection whenever they exercise the privileges granted by the license.

=== Layout of a driving license card ===
| 氏名 | ◯ ◯ ◯ ◯ | | 元号YY年MM月DD日生 | |
| 住所 | ◯◯◯◯◯◯◯◯◯ ◯–◯–◯ | | | |
| 交付 | 元号YY年MM月DD日 ◯◯◯◯◯ | | | 証明写真 |
| YYYY 年(元号 YY 年) MM 月 DD 日まで有効 | | | 運 転 免 許 証 | 証明写真 |
| 免許の 条件等 | | | 運 転 免 許 証 | 証明写真 |
| 番号 | 第 ◯◯◯◯◯◯◯◯◯◯◯◯ 号 | | 運 転 免 許 証 | 証明写真 |
| 二・小・原 | 元号YY年MM月DD日 | 種 類 / 大 型 / 中 型 / 準 中 型 / 普 通 / 大 特 / 大 自 二 / 普 自 二; 種 類 / 小 特 / 原 付 / 大 二 / 中 二 / 普 二 / 大 特 二 / 引 ・ 引 二 | 運 転 免 許 証 | 証明写真 |
| 他 | 元号YY年MM月DD日 | 種 類 / 大 型 / 中 型 / 準 中 型 / 普 通 / 大 特 / 大 自 二 / 普 自 二; 種 類 / 小 特 / 原 付 / 大 二 / 中 二 / 普 二 / 大 特 二 / 引 ・ 引 二 | 運 転 免 許 証 | 都道府県名 公安委員会 |
| 二種 | 元号YY年MM月DD日 | 種 類 / 大 型 / 中 型 / 準 中 型 / 普 通 / 大 特 / 大 自 二 / 普 自 二; 種 類 / 小 特 / 原 付 / 大 二 / 中 二 / 普 二 / 大 特 二 / 引 ・ 引 二 | 運 転 免 許 証 | 都道府県名 公安委員会 |

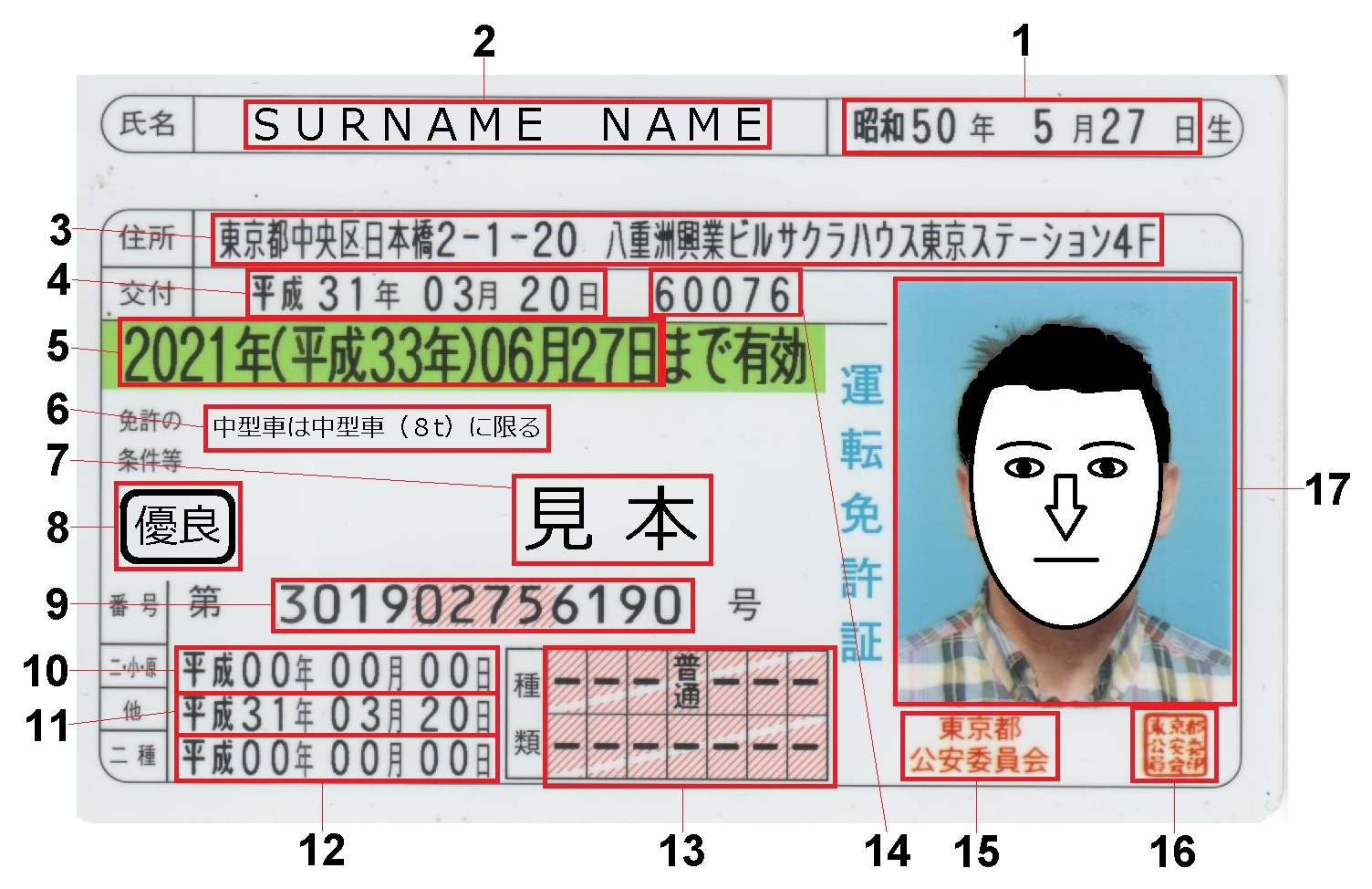
Japanese driving license sample with labels

=== Description ===
The sections of the sample license shown are:

| No. | Japanese | English | Notes |
|---|---|---|---|
| 1 | 年 月 日生 | Date of birth | |
| 2 | 氏名 | Last name and first name | |
| 3 | 住所 | Address | |
| 4 | 交付 | Date of issue of the card | |
| 5 | 年 月 日まで有効 | Date of expiry of the card | Background colour: green for new drivers (valid for 3 years), blue for normal drivers (valid for 3 years), gold for good drivers (no violations or accidents for 5 years, valid for 5 years) In this example, the driver is issued as a new driver. |
| 6 | 免許の条件等 | Conditions | In this sample, vehicles weighing up to 8 tonnes. Usual default also includes a limitation to Automatic Transmission (AT); a separate driving test on the manual transmission vehicle is required for this permission. |
| 7 | 見本 | "Sample" | Does not exist on a normal license |
| 8 | 優良 | Superior | Annotation for good drivers (with gold background) |
| 9 | 番号 | License number | |
| 10 | 二・小・原 | Date of first issue of motorcycle licenses | Including motorcycles (二輪車), small special vehicle (小型特殊自動車), or moped license (原動機付自転車). |
| 11 | 他 | Date of first issue of other licenses | Other categories exclude the commercial ones. |
| 12 | 二種 | Date of first issue of commercial licenses | Literally means driving license of the second kind |
| 13 | 種類 | Valid categories | Valid categories are shown in abbreviations in Kanji, invalid only with a hyphen. |
| 14 | 番号 | Number | Intra-office reference number. |
| 15 | 都道府県公安委員会 | Issuing authority | Public Safety Commission of the issuing prefecture. In the example, the license is issued by Tokyo Metropolitan Public Safety Commission (東京都公安委員会). |
| 16 | | Seal | Official seal of the prefectural public safety commission. |
| 17 | | Photo | |

=== Date format ===
The dates are written in year-month-day order. The years follow the Japanese era calendar scheme. The months and days follow the Gregorian calendar, as in most Western countries.

| YYYY年 | 元号YY年 | | MM月 | DD日 |
|---|---|---|---|---|
| Year | Japanese era name | Period | Month | Day |
| YYYY年 | Meiji (明治01年–明治45年) | 1868–1912 | January (01月); February (02月); March (03月) — October (10月); November (11月); December (12月) | 1st day (01日); 2nd day (02日); 3rd day (03日) — 29th day (29日); 30th day (30日); 31st day (31日) |
| YYYY年 | Taishō (大正01年–大正15年) | 1912–1926 | January (01月); February (02月); March (03月) — October (10月); November (11月); December (12月) | 1st day (01日); 2nd day (02日); 3rd day (03日) — 29th day (29日); 30th day (30日); 31st day (31日) |
| YYYY年 | Shōwa (昭和01年–昭和64年) | 1926–1989 | January (01月); February (02月); March (03月) — October (10月); November (11月); December (12月) | 1st day (01日); 2nd day (02日); 3rd day (03日) — 29th day (29日); 30th day (30日); 31st day (31日) |
| YYYY年 | Heisei (平成01年–平成31年) | 1989–2019 | January (01月); February (02月); March (03月) — October (10月); November (11月); December (12月) | 1st day (01日); 2nd day (02日); 3rd day (03日) — 29th day (29日); 30th day (30日); 31st day (31日) |
| YYYY年 | Reiwa (令和01年–令和YY年) | 2019–present | January (01月); February (02月); March (03月) — October (10月); November (11月); December (12月) | 1st day (01日); 2nd day (02日); 3rd day (03日) — 29th day (29日); 30th day (30日); 31st day (31日) |

In the example pictured above:

- The driver's date of birth (昭和50年5月27日) is the 27th day (27日) of the 5th month (5月) of the 50th year (50年) of the Shōwa era (昭和), or 27 May 1975.
- The expiry date (平成33年3月20日) is the 20th day (20日) of the 3rd month (3月) of the 24th year (33年) of the Heisei era (平成), or 20 March 2021. (Note: On the license, 2021, the year of expiry is labelled as Heisei 33, which is Reiwa 3 (令和3年) in reality. This is because the license issued before the 2019 Japanese imperial transition.)

=== Categories of license ===
Abbreviated names of the categories of vehicle this license includes. For illustrative purposes, this sample license shows every category. Category names are in the same places on every license. If a category is not included in a license, in the place where the category name would appear there is a horizontal bar.

| Abbreviation | 大型 | 中型 | 準中型 | 普通 | 大特 | 大自二 | 普自二 | |
| Full name | 大型自動車 | 中型自動車 | 準中型自動車 | 普通自動車 | 大型特殊自動車 | 大型自動二輪車 | 普通自動二輪車 | |
| English | Large vehicle | Medium vehicle | Semi-Medium vehicle | Ordinary vehicle | Large special vehicle | Unrestricted motorcycle | Ordinary motorcycle | |
| Abbreviation | 小特 | 原付 | 大二 | 中二 | 普二 | 大特二 | け引 | け引二 |
| Full name | 小型特殊自動車 | 原動機付自転車 | 大型自動車第二種 | 中型自動車第二種 | 普通自動車第二種 | 大型特殊自動車第二種 | 牽引自動車 | 牽引自動車第二種 |
| English | Small special vehicle | Moped | Commercial; Large vehicle | Commercial medium vehicle | Commercial ordinary vehicle | Commercial large special vehicle | Tractor-Trailer vehicle | Commercial Tractor- Trailer vehicle |

If the license is licensed with a Tractor-Trailer and a Commercial Tractor-Trailer both, the け引 label will label 引、引二 instead.

=== Amendments ===
Amendments to the license, such as a change of address, can be recorded on the reverse side of the license. For amendments that cannot be recorded in this manner, a new license must be issued.

== Use in other countries ==
The United Kingdom has an exchange agreement with Japan (and with 16 other countries/regions), which allows the holder of a Japanese license who is deemed to be resident in the UK to exchange it for a British license. To do this, the holder must send the license, a translation thereof, an application form and a fee to the DVLA (for Great Britain) or DVA (for Northern Ireland).

Taiwan does not recognise a Japanese International Driving Permit. As an alternative, Taiwan has an exchange agreement with Japan, which allows holders of a Japanese license to drive in Taiwan. For holders of a Japanese license who stay in Taiwan less than one year, they can drive in Taiwan with a Japanese license and its Chinese language translation issued by Japan Automobile Federation (JAF). Holders who stay longer than one year need to obtain a Taiwanese driving license with a Japanese license and other documents, but driving tests can be skipped.

== See also ==
- Driver's license
