= Foreigner registration in Japan =

Japanese system for tracking foreigners

Foreigner registration in Japan is a system used to record information regarding aliens resident in Japan. Under Japanese law, foreign residents who work, study, or stay in Japan for more than 90 days (with exception to diplomats and military personnel under the status of forces agreement,) are issued a Residence Card zairyū kādo (在留カード) at a point of entry by Japanese immigration officers. Their immigration information is then submitted to the Ministry of Justice.

Foreign residents in Japan are required by law to carry their resident card with them at all time, or face a fine up to ¥200,000. Foreign residents are also required to disclose their place of residence to the appropriate municipal office, a process that Japanese citizens are also required to do. Foreign residents are provided with an Individual Number and are eligible to apply for a My Number Card and a proof of residency document, once registered an applicable municipal office. Both foreign residents and Japanese citizens are registered on the Basic Resident Registry Network jūmin kihon daichō nettowāku (住民基本台帳ネットワーク).

If a foreign resident leaves Japan and relinquishes residence, they must return their Resident Card before their departure at an airport, seaport, or the nearest Ministry of Justice office. Foreign residents temporarily leaving Japan who wish to keep their Status of Residence must apply for a Re-Entry Permit or Special Re-Entry permit and retain their Residence Cards on departure. In principle, Special Re-Entry permits are created ad-hoc at airports and seaports, whereas Re-Entry permits require advanced application.

Some Korean residents of Japan have a Special Permanent Resident Certificate instead of a Residence Card.

== Registered information ==
The information stored in the alien registration system included:

- Date of registration
- Name (including any legal alias)
- Date of birth
- Gender
- Nationality and place of residence in home country
- Place of birth
- Employer/school, work/school address and occupation (if any)
- Passport number and date of issuance
- Date of landing in Japan
- Status of residence and duration of stay
- Residential address
- Information regarding household members (including name, date of birth, nationality and relationship)
- Information regarding parent(s) and/or spouse residing in Japan.

This information was recorded in a physical document called a tōroku genpyō (登録原票), kept by the municipality in which the subject lived. Any changes in registered information had to be reported to the municipal office.

If a resident alien moved within Japan, they were required to report their move to the new municipality of residence.

== Legal alias ==
Registered aliens are allowed to adopt an alias (通称名, tsūshōmei) or 通名 as a second legal name. This resembles the 通称 that Japanese are allowed to use — for example, to continue using a maiden name at work and on bank accounts after marriage. Foreigners who are long-term residents of Japan, particularly ethnic Koreans whose families have lived in Japan for generations, often adopt Japanese names as aliases in order to integrate within society. Ethnic Japanese who live in Japan as resident aliens may use a legal alias to reflect their ancestral name. Legal aliases are also used when registering a seal in a different script than the applicant's legal name (e.g., in katakana rather than Latin script).

Japanese nationals often use aliases for non-official purposes. For example, women often continue to use their maiden names following marriage, even though they are required to adopt the same family name as their husband for their legal name. However, Japanese nationals are not permitted to use an alias for legal purposes: their name on any official document (e.g. domestic use Japanese identification) must match the name appearing in their family register and resident register. Japanese passports may contain alternate names in parentheses next to the family name or the given name if the Japanese can show a legal connection and use of these names overseas. Multiple alternate names are separated by slashes. Non-standard non-Hepburn romanization may also be used for the main names if one can show a legal connection using these spellings.
