= My Number Card =

Identity document issued in Japan

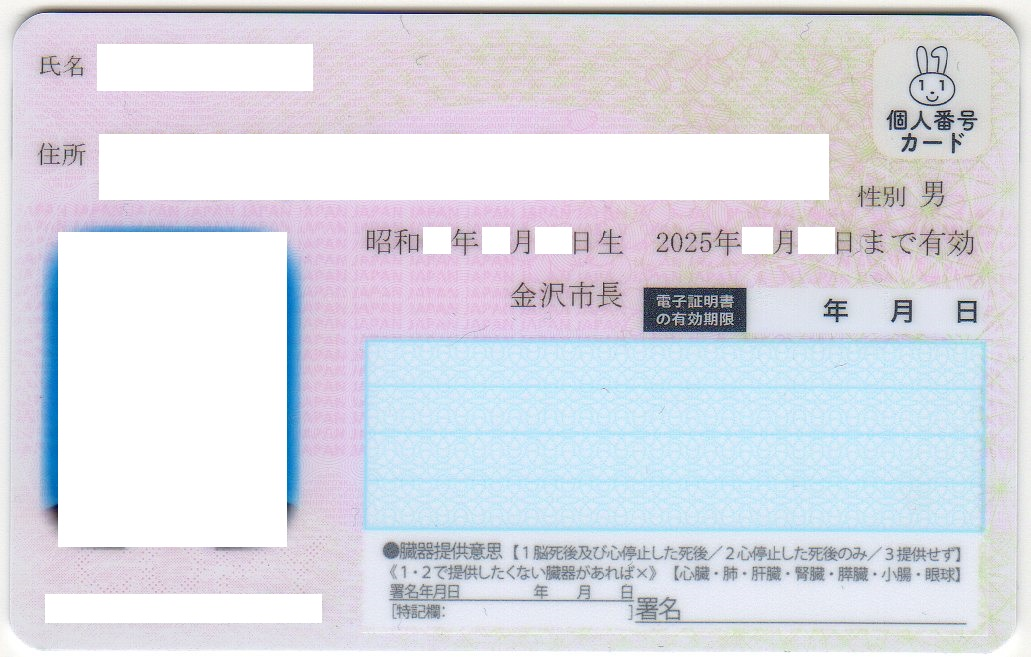

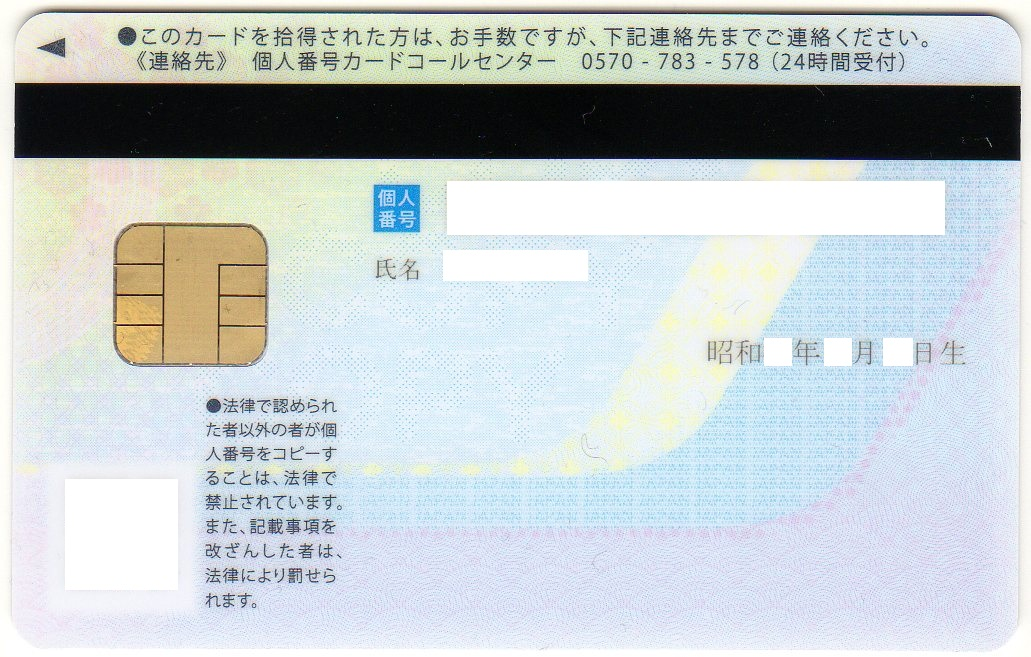
- Front and Back of a contemporary My Number Card
- Type: identity document
- Issued by: municipalities of Japan
- First issued: January 2016; 10 years ago
- Purpose: identification; digital certificate facilitates simplified access of certain government documents
- Valid in: Japan
- Eligibility: Japanese citizens or legal residents with a jūminhyō
- Expiration: 10 years from date of issue for residents aged over 20 years old at time of issue, 5 years for digital certificates and minors under 20 years old, and equivalent to the date of the expiry of the Residence Card for foreign residents
- Cost: Free
- Size: www.kojinbango-card.go.jp/en/

The My Number Card (Japanese: マイナンバーカード, Hepburn: mai nanbā kādo), officially Individual Number Card (Japanese: 個人番号カード, Hepburn: kojin bangō kādo), is an identity document issued to citizens of Japan and foreign residents which contains a unique 12-digit Individual Number (Japanese: 個人番号, Hepburn: kojin bangō) that serves as a national identification number in Japan. Unlike similar-looking identity cards in Europe, the My Number Card can be issued to both Japanese citizens and foreign residents, and is not proof of nationality. The My Number Card is used in Japan to streamline administrative purposes like filing taxes and social security, and it is also utilized to provide disaster response to those in need. It is the de facto Japanese equivalent to a U.S. Social Security Number.

The My Number Card stores information such as personal name, photo, address, birthday, and sex. Residents who wish to obtain the card can request an application form from the municipality (via a ward office or city hall) where they reside.

== History ==
=== Background ===
Many countries around the world, including Japan, require residents and citizens to disclose and register their address with the government for various bureaucratic purposes. Many countries obligate that their residents and citizens provide up to date information regarding where they reside, by visiting a registration office or the police within a few days after establishing a new residence. However some countries, like the United States or Canada, do not require their residents or citizens to provide this information to the government, unless they are applying for a passport or drivers license.

Both Japanese citizens and foreign residents are obligated to report their domicile to their nearest municipal government office.

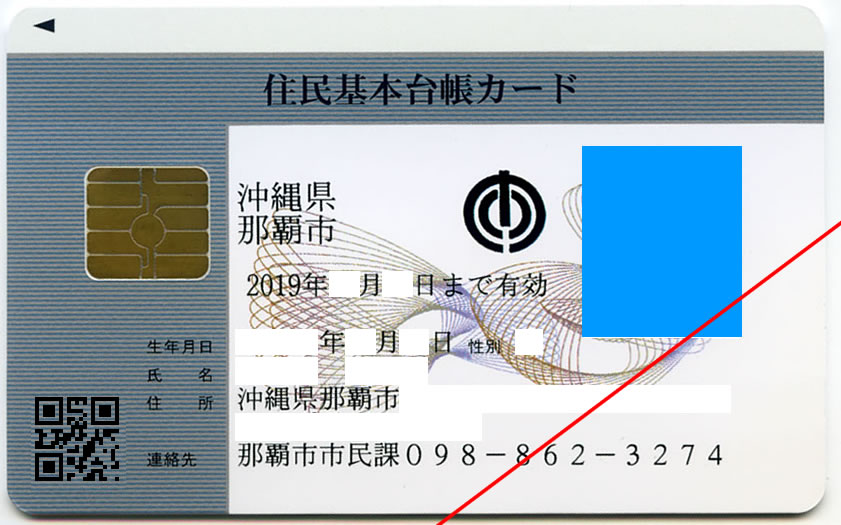
A Jūki kādo issued to Naha City resident. August 2009

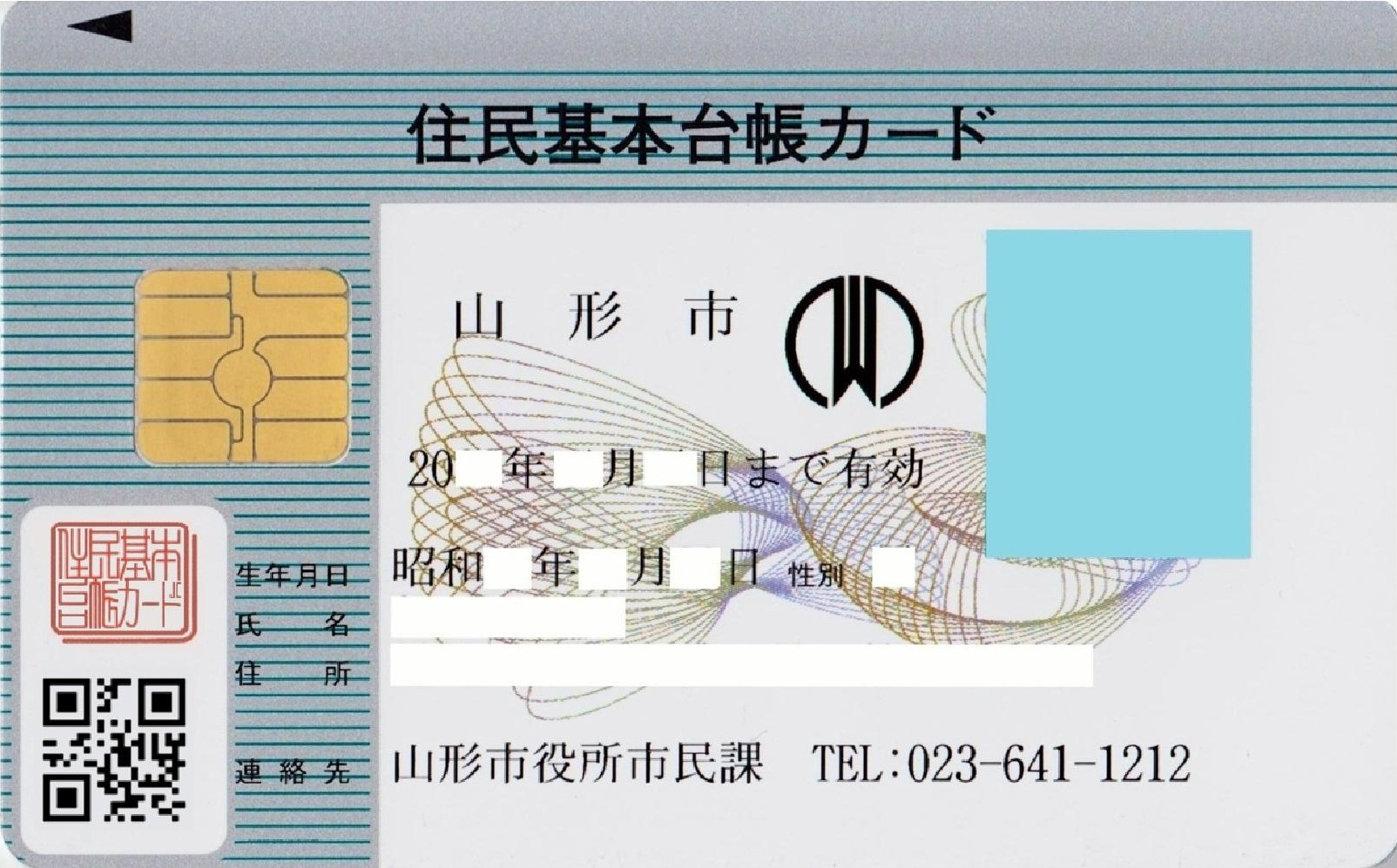
A Jūki kādo issued to Yamagata resident. December 2010

=== Basic Resident Registers Network ===
In 2002, the Japanese government created the Basic Resident Registers Network and started to issue unique 11-digits identity codes at request to people who did not possess a drivers license, but wanted a identity card to prove legitimacy when applying for a Japanese passport, obtaining copies of their family registry, or any other activities that require ID. These identity codes provided information regarding the bearer's name, date of birth, gender, address, and the identity code itself.

By 2003, the Japanese government started to issue a Resident registration card (住基カード, Jūki kādo), which are physical cards with IC chips linked to these identity numbers. Both the Basic Resident Registers Network and the Jūki kādo were negatively received and had widespread opposition from people, political parties, and prefectures. Despite this, in 2008, the Supreme Court of Japan ruled the Basic Resident Registers Network and subsequent affiliations constitutional.

=== Individual Number and My Number Card ===
Beginning in 2015 the Japanese government started to make significant steps in overseeing Japan's transformation to a digital economy, and established a new government office titled the Minister for Digital Transformation. Under this new cabinet, the Japanese government started to phase out the Basic Resident Registers Network system's 11-digits identity codes, in order to establish a new modern system of unique 12-digits codes, called the Individual Number (Japanese: 個人番号, Hepburn: kojin bangō). These codes were issued to all Japanese citizens and foreign residents in a unsolicited manner. To advertise the system's introduction, the Government of Japan hired actress Aya Ueto and created a mascot character named "Maina-chan".

Beginning in March 2021, the Japanese government began to issue My Number Cards embedded with IC chips that can double as health insurance cards. These cards can be read by card readers, and in conjunction with facial recognition, give facial medical care providers instant access to patients' past health checkup results and prescription drug history. They are accepted at all medical institutions, and separate health insurance cards will no longer be issued as of December 2024.

The rate of uptake for the cards in Japan was around 25% in March 2021 and 40% as of October 2021. The government aimed to have almost all residents obtain the card by March 2023.

In May 2023, an Android app became available allowing people to use their phone instead of their My Number Card. This later evolved into a plan to support My Number Cards in Google Wallet. The launch of this feature is planned for 2026. In June 2025, it became possible to add My Number cards to Apple Wallet on iOS. In June 2026, the Japanese government introduced the integration of "Tokutei Zairyū Card" (特定在留カード / Specified Residence Card) with the My Number Card for mid-to-long-term foreign residents registered on the Basic Resident Register. Under this voluntary framework, the Immigration Services Agency allows eligible residents to consolidate the administrative functions of the Residence Card and My Number Card into a single IC card.

== Features ==
The My Number Card, although not a required document, may simplify access to certain government services. Not only is it an accepted form of ID across Japan, it can be used to access National Health Insurance, apply for a Japanese passport, open a bank account, and obtain vaccination certificates.

The Ministry of Internal Affairs and Communications promotes a cashless payment card called Mainapoint (マイナポイント) linked to a person's My Number.

== Identification of national public officials ==
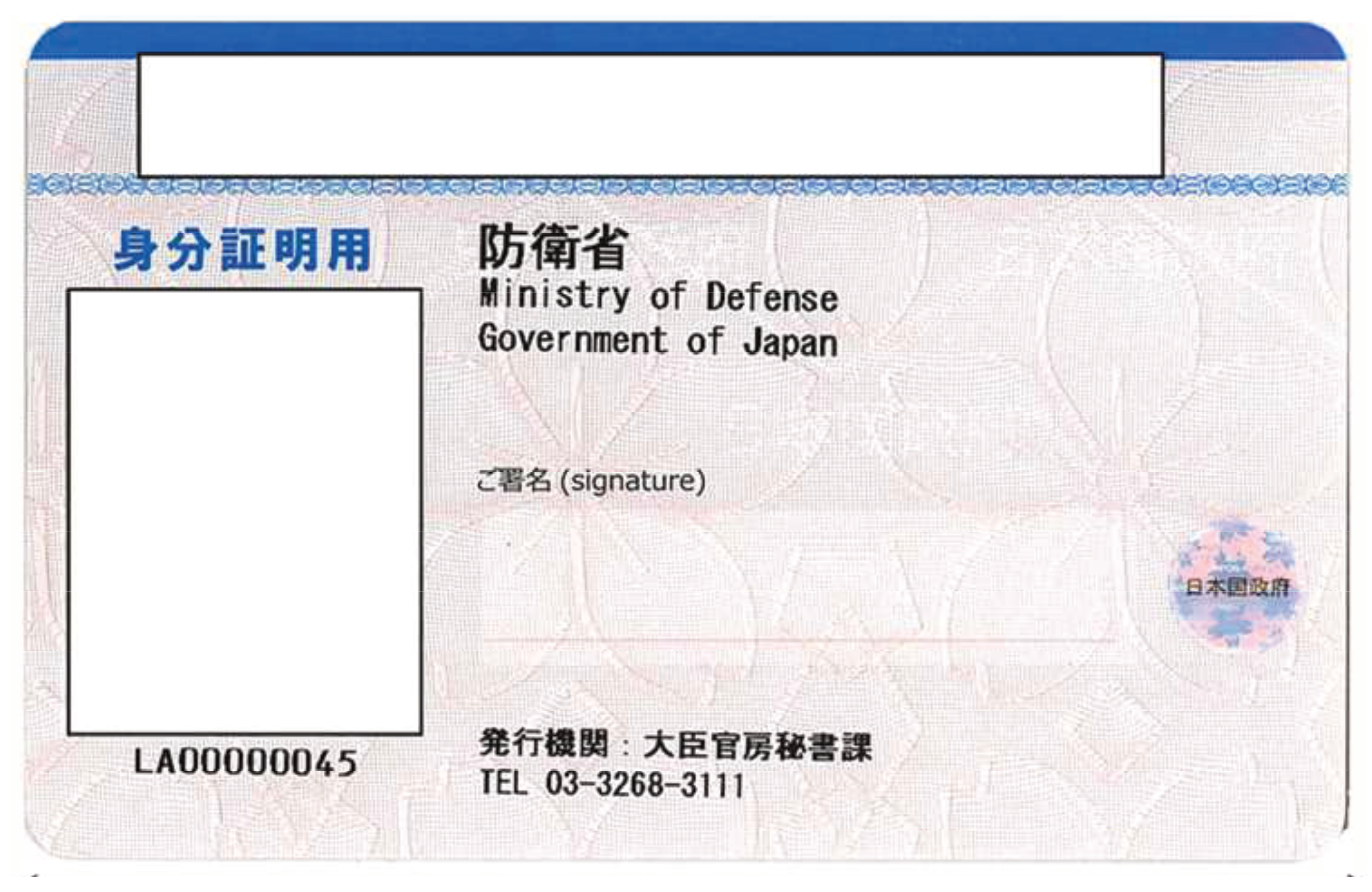
A masking card

The My Number Card is used as an ID card for civil servants in the Japanese government. A masking card, in which the photo and name fields of the My Number Card are cut out so that they can be seen from the outside, is stacked on top of the My Number Card and stored in a Fujifilm card case to serve as identification for national public officials and civilian officials of the SDF. In addition to the name of the ministry or agency to which the person belongs, the masking card has a signature column to prevent identity theft.

== Issues ==
The first fraud related to the system occurred in 2015 when an elderly woman in the Kantō region was defrauded of several million yen. The program was temporarily paused in May 2023 due to 13 confirmed cases of another person's information being displayed when the card was used.

== See also ==
- Individual Number
- Basic Resident Registry Card
