= Small two-wheel motor vehicle (Japan) =

A small two-wheel motor vehicle (小型自動二輪車, kogata jidō nirinsha), sometimes referred to as a small motorcycle, is one of the vehicle categories in the Road Traffic Act of Japan. Such vehicles (motorcycles) have a displacement of more than 50 cc but no more than 125 cc, or their rated output exceeds 0.6 kW but is no more than 1 kW.

In contrast, in the same act, such vehicle with a displacement of more than 50 cc but no more than 400 cc is called a standard two-wheel motor vehicle (普通自動二輪車, futsū jidō nirinsha), or ordinary motorcycle. Thus, a small motorcycle is a subcategory of an ordinary motorcycle.

Meanwhile, a motorcycle with a displacement of over 400 cc is called a large two-wheel motor vehicle (大型自動二輪車, ōgata jidō nirinsha) (heavy motorcycle).

== Categories ==
Some of the vehicle categories under Japanese law are as follows:

Name	Japanese	Description
Moped	原動機付自転車	Any motorcycle with engine displacement of 50 cc or less.
Small motorcycle	小型自動二輪車	Any motorcycle with engine displacement over 50 cc but no more than 125 cc.
Ordinary motorcycle	普通自動二輪車	Any motorcycle with engine displacement over 50 cc but no more than 400 cc.
Heavy motorcycle	大型自動二輪車	Any motorcycle with engine displacement over 400 cc.

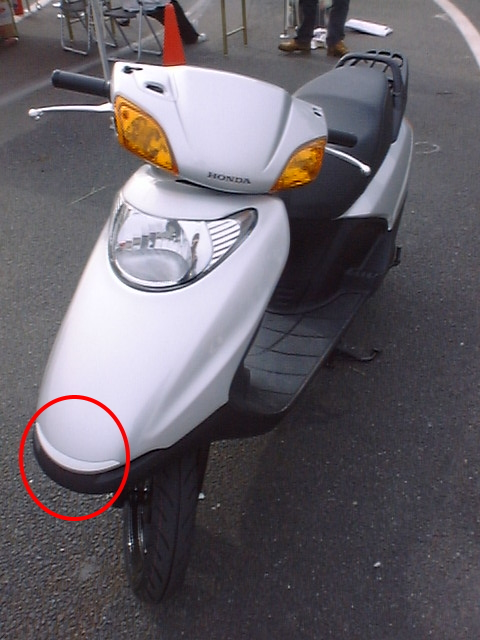
Front sticker

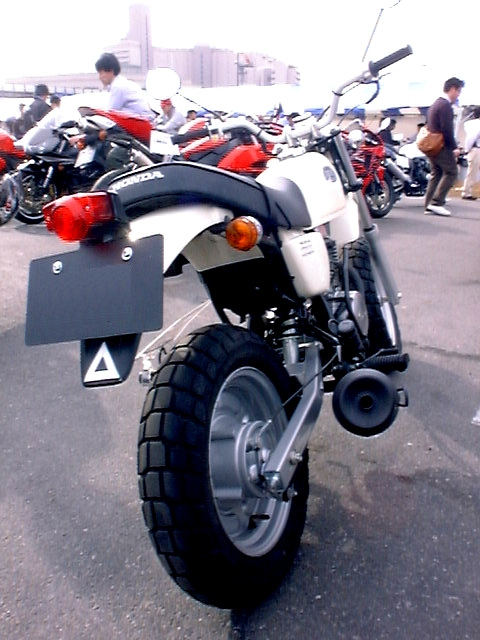
Rear sticker

Small motorcycles in Japan can display a white sticker on the front end of the vehicle, and a triangular sticker on the rear (optional).

== License ==
A license to drive a small motorcycle can be obtained from the age of 16 onward.

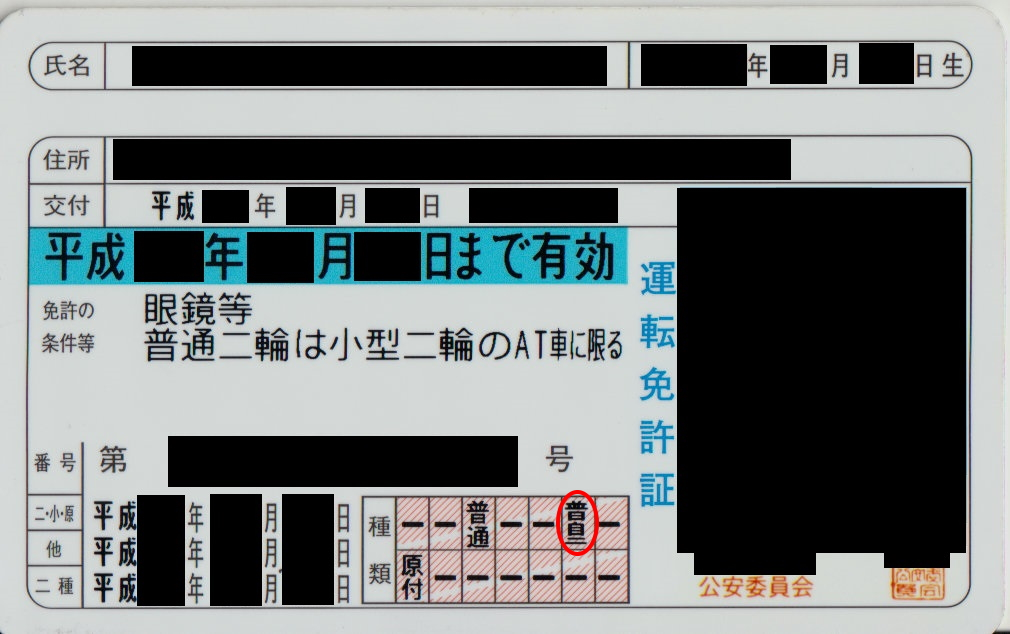
Japanese driving licence sample with category for ordinary motorcycle (普自二) circled. In the license's remarks section halfway down the card, it says "Ordinary motorcycle is limited to AT (automatic transmission) small motorcycle" (普自二輪は小型二輪のAT車に限る)

Displacement		50 cc or less	125 cc or less	250 cc or less	400 cc or less	Over 400 cc
Road Traffic Act	Vehicle classification	Moped	Ordinary motorcycle (small motorcycle)	Ordinary motorcycle		Heavy motorcycle
Road Traffic Act	Type of license	Moped license	Ordinary motorcycle license (limited to small motorcycle)	Ordinary motorcycle license		Heavy motorcycle license

- Motorcycles with displacements of 250 cc or less are exempt from a motor-vehicle inspection (車検, shaken).

== Other details ==
License type	Minimum age	Displacement	Loading capacity	Legal speed limit (general roads)	Expressway riding	Pillion riding	Bus lane riding
Moped	16	Up to 50 cc	30 kg (66 lb)	30 km/h (19 mph)	No	No	Yes
Small motorcycle (incl. AT)	16	Up to 125 cc	60 kg (130 lb)	60 km/h (37 mph)	No	Yes (1 year after license acquisition)	No
Ordinary motorcycle (incl. AT)	16	Up to 400 cc	60 kg (130 lb)	60 km/h (37 mph)	Yes	Yes (1 year after license acquisition)	No
Heavy motorcycle (incl. AT)	18	No limit	60 kg (130 lb)	60 km/h (37 mph)	Yes	Yes (1 year after license acquisition)	No

== Gallery ==
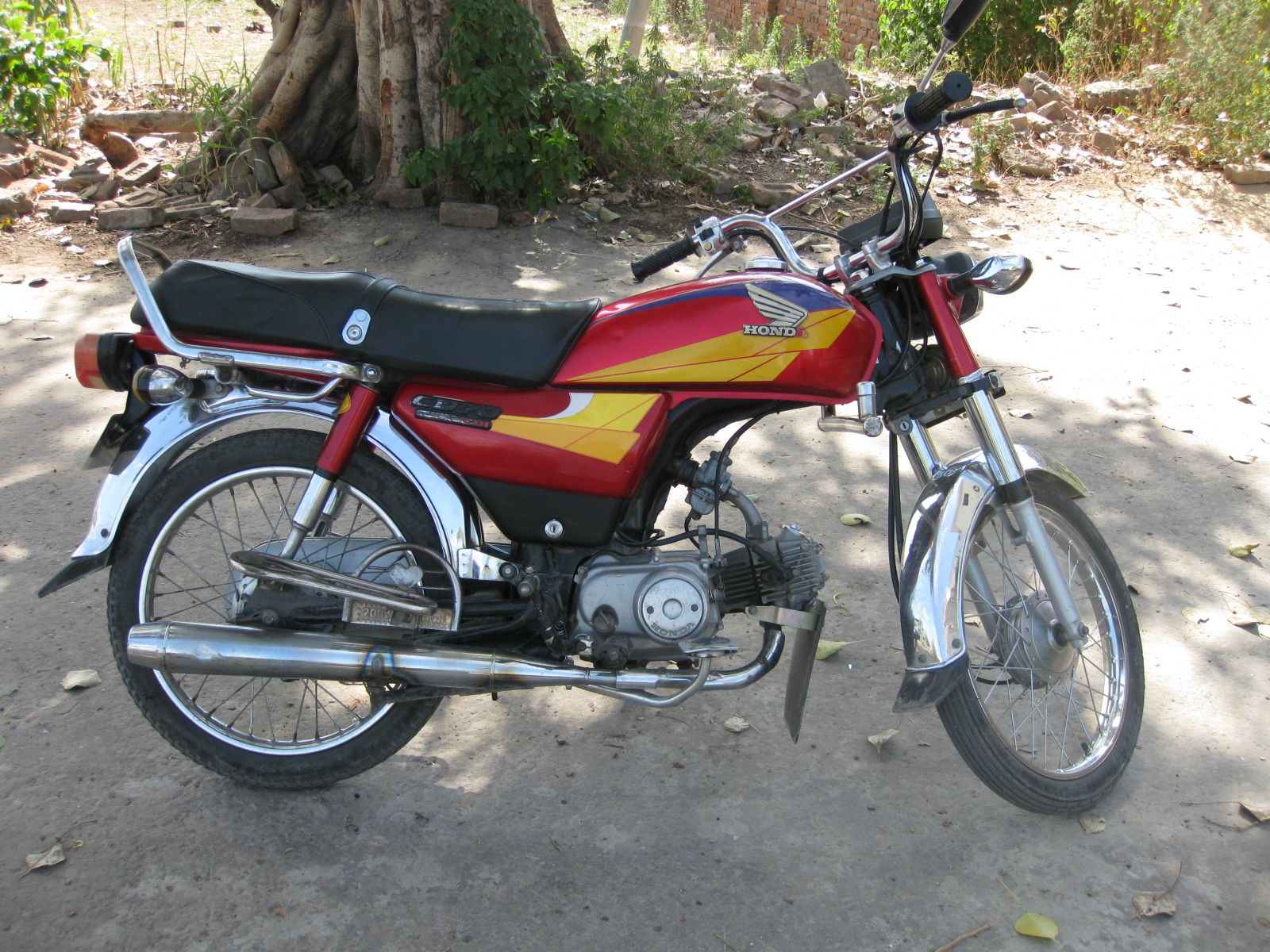
Honda 70 (72 cc)

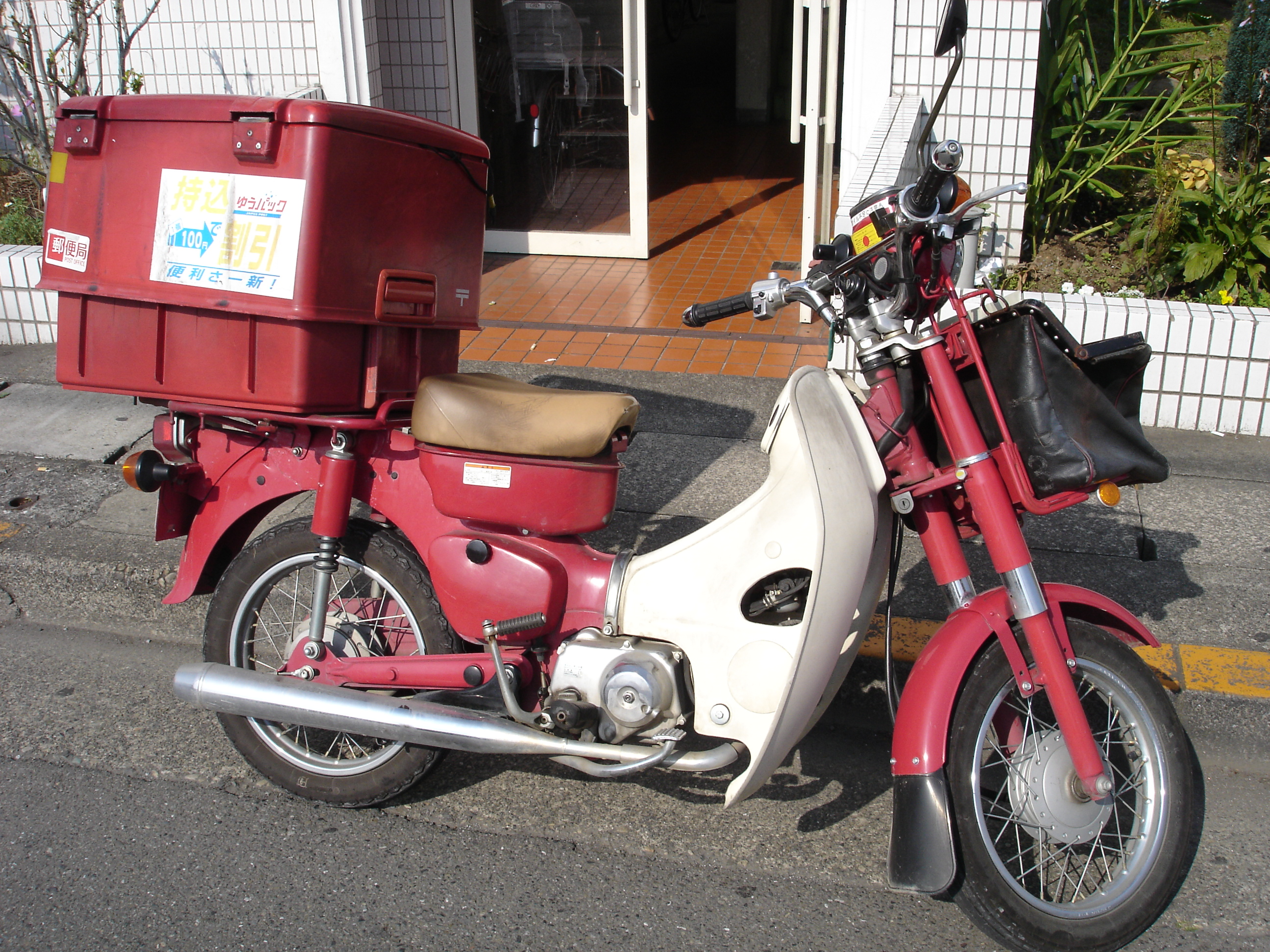
Honda Super Cub 110MD (used for delivering post in Japan)

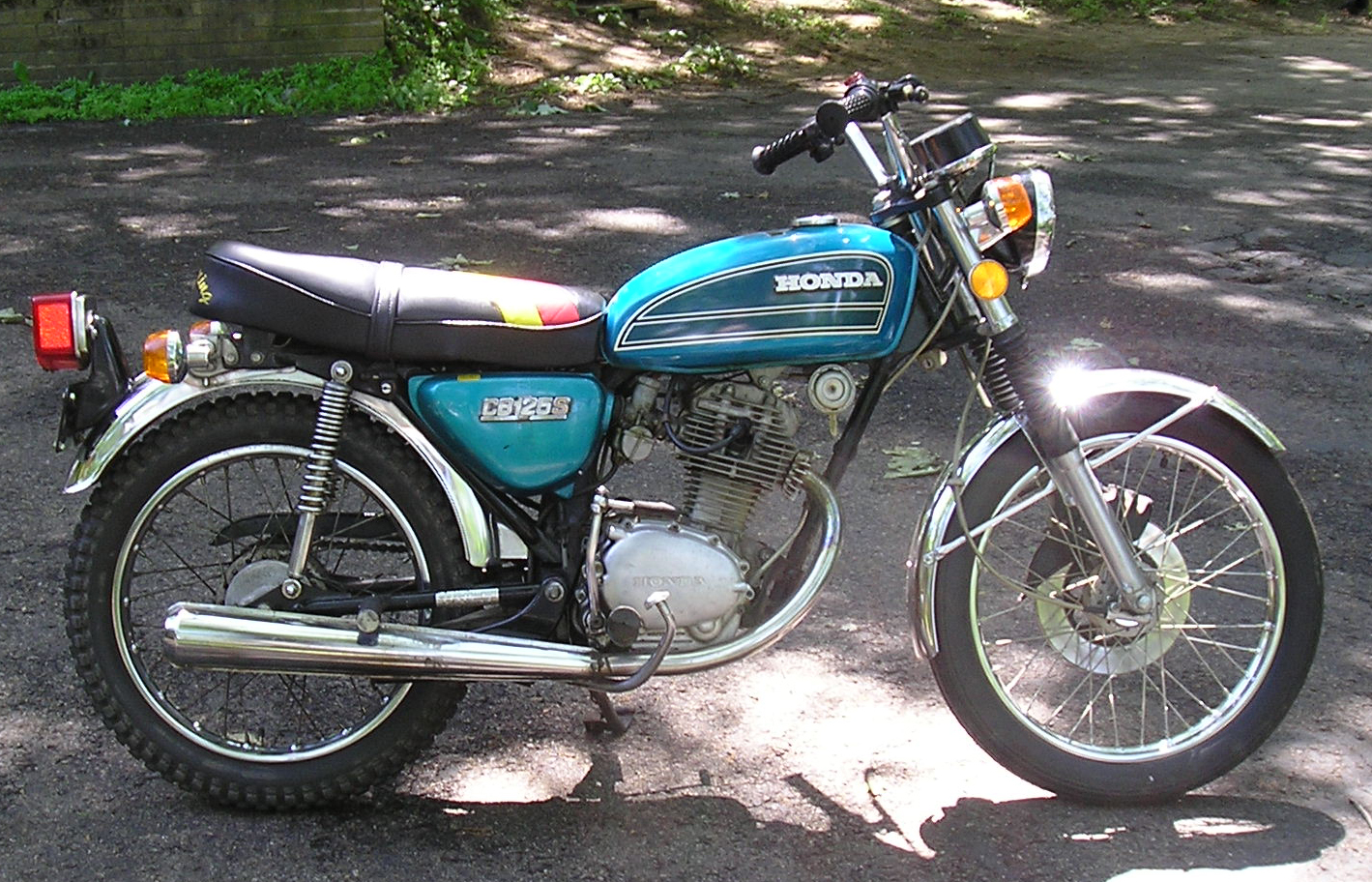
Honda CB125 (124 cc)
