= Standard two-wheel motor vehicle (Japan) =

A standard two-wheel motor vehicle (普通自動二輪車, futsū jidō nirinsha), sometimes referred to as an ordinary motorcycle, is one of the vehicle categories in the Road Traffic Act of Japan. Such vehicles (motorcycles) have a displacement of more than 50 cc but no more than 400 cc.

In contrast, in the same act, such vehicle with a displacement of 125 cc or less is called a small two-wheel motor vehicle (小型二輪車, kogata nirinsha) (small motorcycle), and is a subcategory of a standard two-wheel motor vehicle. Meanwhile, one with a displacement of over 400 cc is called a large two-wheel motor vehicle (大型自動二輪車, ōgata jidō nirinsha) (heavy motorcycle).

== Overview ==
A standard two-wheel motor vehicle can be operated with an ordinary motorcycle license or a heavy motorcycle license. It is defined in the Road Traffic Act's Enforcement Regulations as a "two-wheeled vehicle (including one with a side car) other than a large special vehicle, heavy motorcycle and small special vehicle".

Three-wheeled vehicles are treated as ordinary vehicles, and are not classed as motorcycles. However, the safety standard for motorcycles is applied to a three-wheeled vehicle that has coaxial wheels with a width of less than 46 cm, where the body or wheels incline when turning.

== License ==
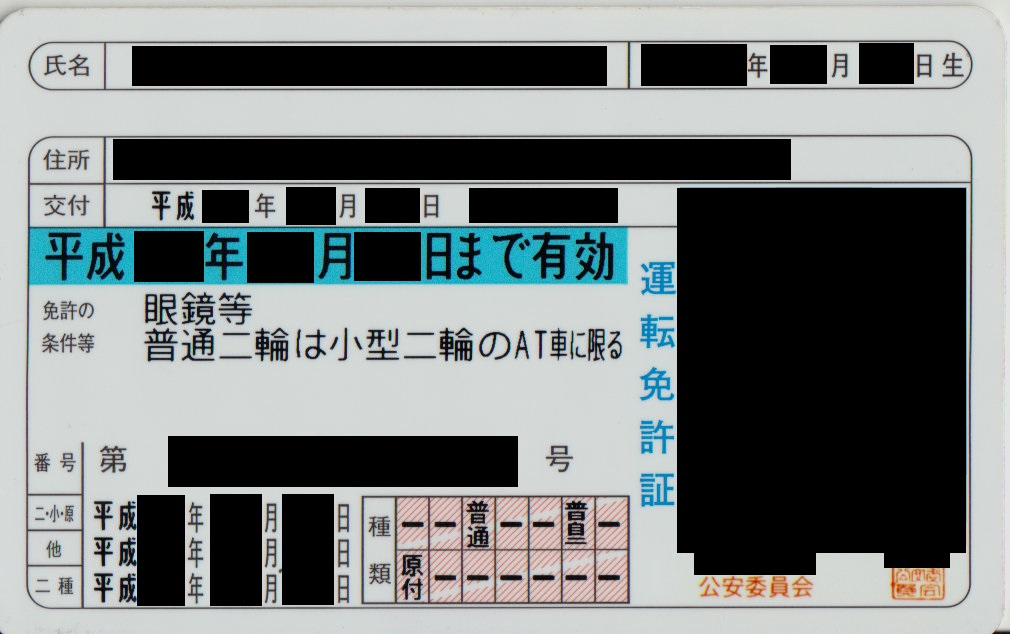
Excerpt of a Japanese driving licence showing the 普通二輪 (standard motorcycle) category, indicated as 普二自 on the licence.

A license to ride an ordinary motorcycle can be obtained from the age of 16 onward.

== Categories ==
Some of the vehicle categories under Japanese law are as follows:

Name	Japanese	Description
Moped	原動機付自転車	Any motorcycle with engine displacement of 50 cc or less.
Small motorcycle	小型自動二輪車	Any motorcycle with engine displacement over 50 cc but no more than 125 cc.
Ordinary motorcycle	普通自動二輪車	Any motorcycle with engine displacement over 50 cc but no more than 400 cc.
Heavy motorcycle	大型自動二輪車	Any motorcycle with engine displacement over 400 cc.

== Other details ==
License type	Minimum age	Displacement	Loading capacity	Legal speed limit (general roads)	Expressway riding	Pillion riding	Bus lane riding
Moped	16	Up to 50 cc	30 kg (66 lb)	30 km/h (19 mph)	No	No	Yes
Small motorcycle (incl. AT)	16	Up to 125 cc	60 kg (130 lb)	60 km/h (37 mph)	No	Yes (1 year after license acquisition)	No
Ordinary motorcycle (incl. AT)	16	Up to 400 cc	60 kg (130 lb)	60 km/h (37 mph)	Yes	Yes (1 year after license acquisition)	No
Heavy motorcycle (incl. AT)	18	No limit	60 kg (130 lb)	60 km/h (37 mph)	Yes	Yes (1 year after license acquisition)	No

== Gallery ==
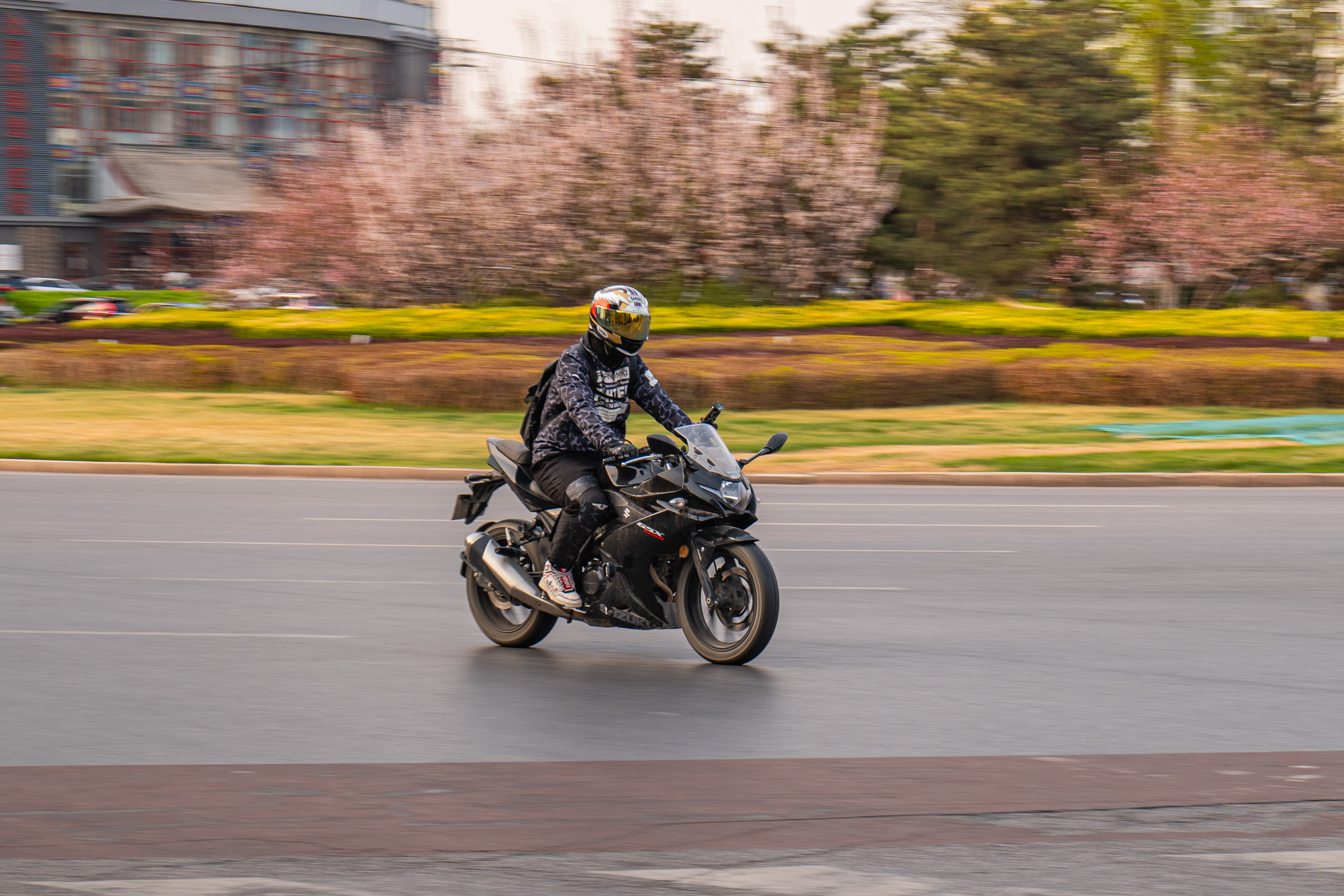
Suzuki GSX250R (248 cc)

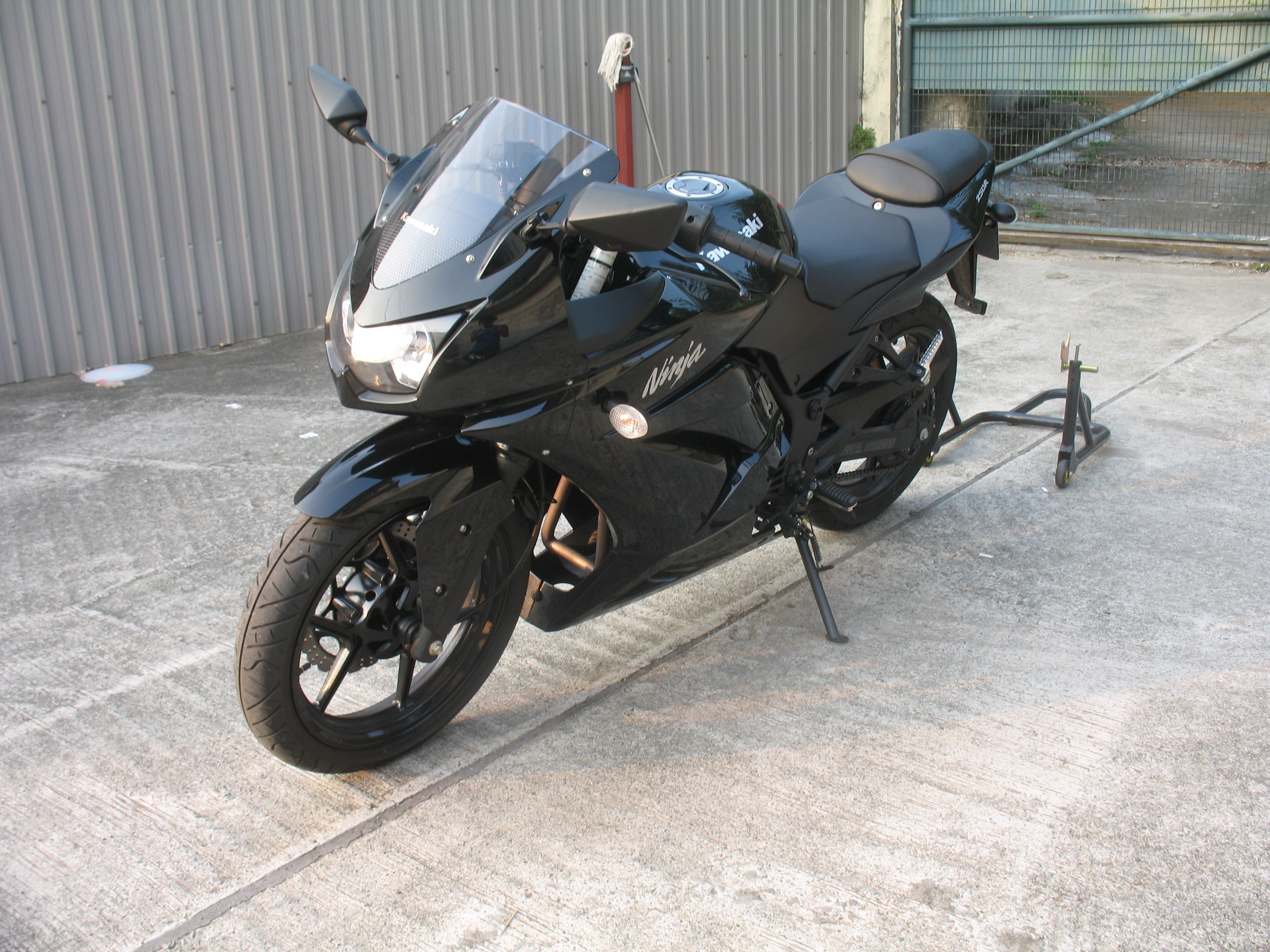
Kawasaki Ninja 250 (248 cc)

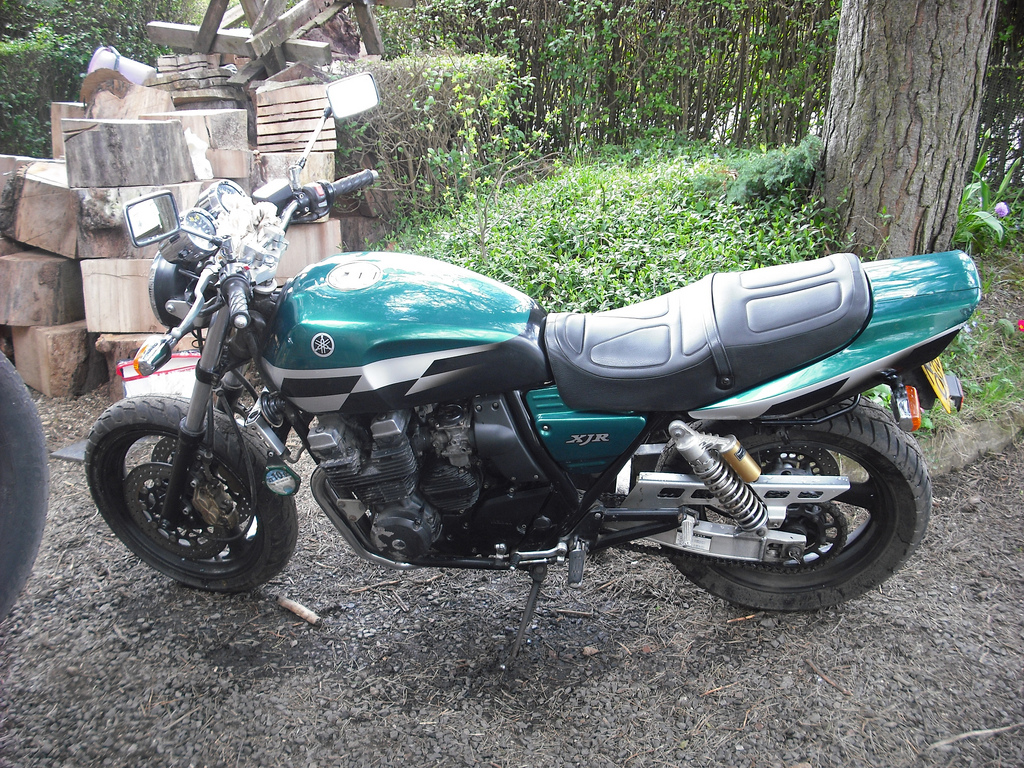
Yamaha XJR400 (399 cc)

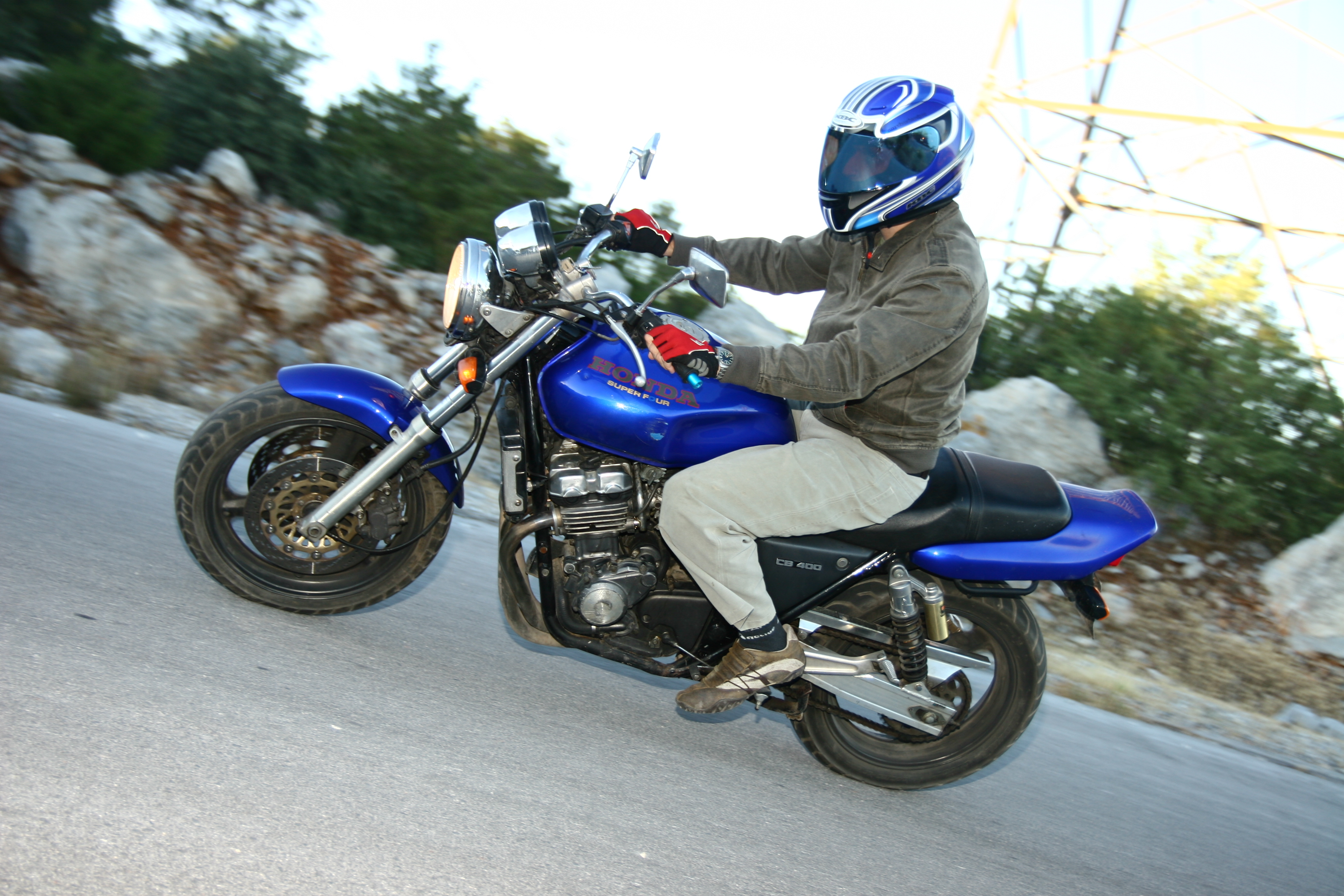
Honda CB400 Super Four (399 cc)

== See also ==
- Bōsōzoku
- Mopeds in Japan
- Small two-wheel motor vehicle (Japan)
- Large two-wheel motor vehicle (Japan)
