= Driver's license in Taiwan =

Driver's license
- Traditional Chinese: 駕駛執照
Transcriptions
Standard Mandarin
- Hanyu Pinyin: Jiàshǐ Zhízhào
- Wade–Giles: Chia⁴-shih³ Chih²-chao⁴
Hakka
- Pha̍k-fa-sṳ: Ka-sṳ́ Chṳp-cheu
Southern Min
- Hokkien POJ: Kà-sú Chip-chiàu
- Tâi-lô: Kà-sú Tsip-tsiàu

Alternative Chinese name
- Traditional Chinese: 駕照
Transcriptions
Standard Mandarin
- Hanyu Pinyin: Jiàzhào
- Wade–Giles: Chia⁴-chao⁴
Hakka
- Pha̍k-fa-sṳ: Ka-cheu
Southern Min
- Hokkien POJ: Kà-chiàu
- Tâi-lô: Kà-tsiàu

A driving licence (Chinese: 駕駛執照) is a document that allows the holder to drive on any roads in the Republic of China (ROC, Taiwan). It is issued by the Ministry of Transportation and Communications to a qualified motor vehicle driver. The number on a license is the same as the ID number of the license holder's household registration in Taiwan. In Taiwan, the license is sometimes accepted as a valid identity document, as its information replicates most of what is on a National Identification Card.

== Format ==
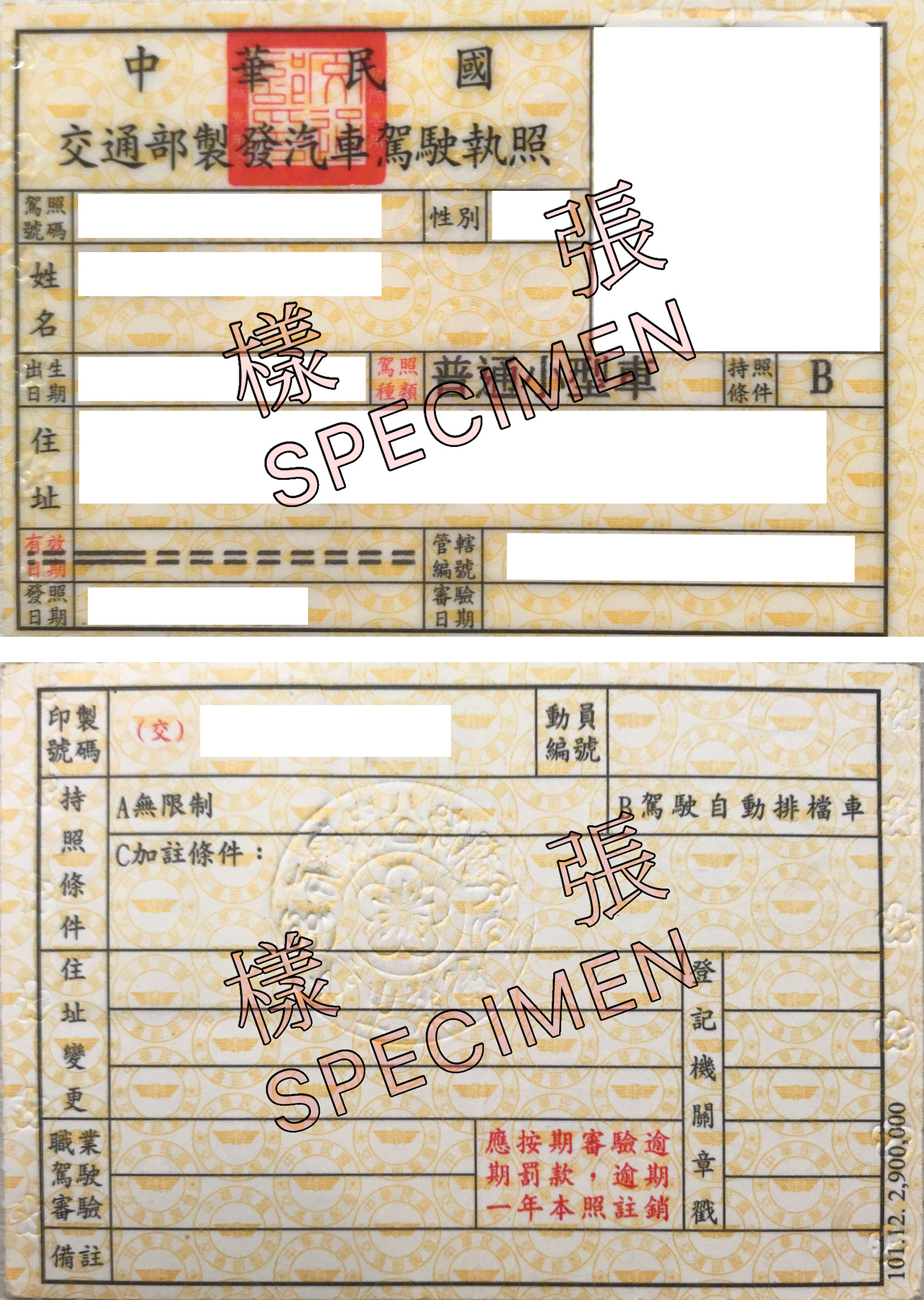
Front and back of a Republic of China (ROC) driver's license

Licenses are only issued in Chinese (Traditional script). For comparison purposes, the table below is shown in bilingual form.

中 華 民 國 Republic of China 交通部制發汽車駕駛執照; Driver license					照片; Photo	
駕照號碼; License No.	A000000000		性別; Sex	◯	照片; Photo	
姓名; Name	◯◯◯◯◯				照片; Photo	
出生日期; Date of birth	YYY.MM.DD	駕照種類; Type	◯◯◯◯◯◯		持照條件; Condition	X
住址; Address	◯◯◯◯◯◯◯◯◯◯◯◯					
有效日期; Date of expiry	YYY.MM.DD		管轄編號; Control No.	8000000000000		
發照日期; Date of issue	YYY.MM.DD		審驗日期; Date of inspection	YYY.MM.DD		

Notes:

- License Number is identical to the National Identification Number.
- All dates are written in Republic of China calendar; the year is in a three-digit format.
- Conditions:
  - A – Unlimited
  - B – Automatic transmission cars only
  - C – Other conditions on reverse side
- Date of expiry: Since July 2013, all licenses are valid until the holder's 75th birthday. A holder older than 75 has to renew their license every three years.
- Date of issue: the date that the holder passed the driver test of the type
- Date of Inspection: date of the driver's physical examination (for a commercial driver's license only).

== Categories ==
Driver's licenses are categorized pursuant to the Road Traffic Security Rules (道路交通安全規則) in Taiwan. These 15 categories are:

Ordinary automobiles			Business automobiles			Motorcycles		
No.	Name	Chinese	No.	Name	Chinese	No.	Name	Chinese
1	Driver license of ordinary light vehicle	小型車普通 駕駛執照	5	Driver license of business light vehicle	小型車職業 駕駛執照	11	Driver license of small light-duty motorcycle	小型輕型機器 腳踏車駕駛執照
2	Driver license of ordinary large truck	大貨車普通 駕駛執照	6	Driver license of business large truck	大貨車職業 駕駛執照	12	Driver license of ordinary light-duty motorcycle	普通輕型機器 腳踏車駕駛執照
3	Driver license of ordinary large passenger vehicle	大客車普通 駕駛執照	7	Driver license of business large passenger vehicle	大客車職業 駕駛執照	14	Driver license of ordinary heavy-duty motorcycle	普通重型機器 腳踏車駕駛執照
4	Driver license of ordinary container truck	聯結車普通 駕駛執照	8	Driver license of business container truck	聯結車職業 駕駛執照	15	Driver license of large heavy-duty motorcycle	大型重型機器 腳踏車駕駛執照

- 9. International Driving Permit (國際駕駛執照): A multilingual translation a Republic of China license for international use, issued after Vienna Convention on Road Traffic 1968. As the Republic of China has lost diplomatic relations with most of the world since the 1970s, international driver permits from Taiwan are mostly not honored.
- 10. driver license of light-duty motorcycle (輕型機器腳踏車駕駛執照): Formerly used, now splits into 11 and 12.
- 13. driver license of heavy-duty motorcycle (重型機器腳踏車駕駛執照): Formerly used, now splits into 14 and 15.

== Licenses and motor vehicles ==
Type	Vehicle		Definition	Licenses allowed to drive							
Type	Vehicle		Definition	1, 5	2, 6	3, 7	4, 8	11	12	14	15
Auto- mobiles	Light vehicle	小型車	Motor vehicles having a permissible maximum weight not exceeding 3,500 kg and not more than nine seats including the driver's seat.	Yes	No	No	No	No	No	No	No
Auto- mobiles	Large truck	大貨車	Motor vehicles used for the carriage of goods and whose permissible maximum weight exceeds 3,500 kg.	Yes	Yes	No	No	No	No	No	No
Auto- mobiles	Large passenger vehicle	大客車	Motor vehicles used for the carriage of passengers and having ten seats or more including the driver's seat, e.g. city bus, tour bus.	Yes	Yes	Yes	No	No	No	No	No
Auto- mobiles	Container truck	聯結車	Tractor coupled to a trailer whose permissible maximum mass exceeds 750 kg, e.g. Link Truck, Tractor-Full Trailer, Tractor-Semi Trailer.	Yes	Yes	Yes	Yes	No	No	No	No
Motor- cycles	Small light-duty motorcycle	小型輕型 機器腳踏車	Electric motorcycles with power not exceeding 1.34 HP.	No	No	No	No	Yes	No	No	No
Motor- cycles	Ordinary light-duty motorcycle	普通輕型 機器腳踏車	Motorcycles with a cubic capacity not exceeding 50 cm³, or electric motorcycles with power between 1.34 HP and 5 HP.	No	No	No	No	Yes	Yes	No	No
Motor- cycles	Ordinary heavy-duty motorcycle	普通重型 機器腳踏車	Motorcycles with a cubic capacity between 50 cm³ and 250 cm³, or with power between 5 HP and 40 HP.	No	No	No	No	Yes	Yes	Yes	No
Motor- cycles	Large heavy-duty motorcycle	大型重型 機器腳踏車	Motorcycles with a cubic capacity exceeding 250 cm³, or with power over 40 HP.	No	No	No	No	Yes	Yes	Yes	Yes

== Driving tests ==
The minimum age pursuant to Article 60 is normally 18, but one must be at least 20 to get a professional license or a license for an ultra-heavy motorcycle. A professional license must be converted to an ordinary one at the age of 60, but a professional small-vehicle driver may keep their license until they are 65 years old if they pass annual physical examinations. Since driving jobs are not open to foreigners, they cannot obtain a professional driver's license.

== International Driving Permit (IDP) ==
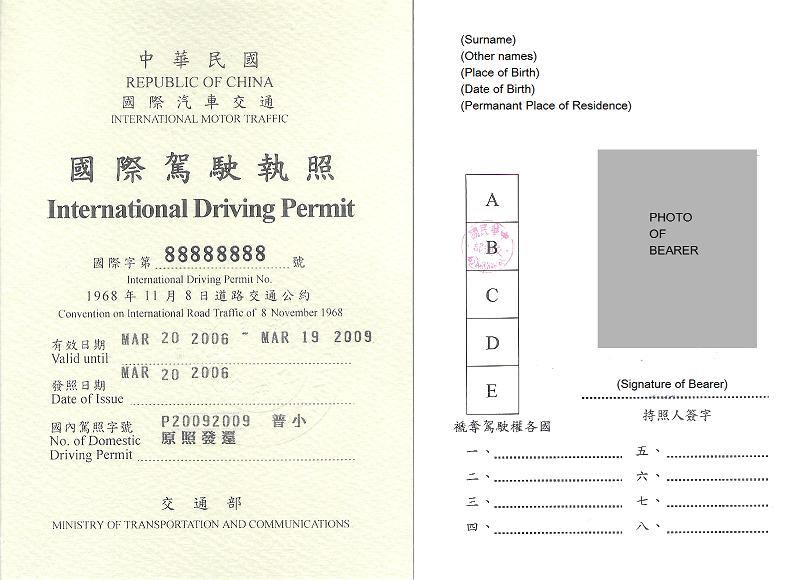
International Driving Permit of the Republic of China (ROC)

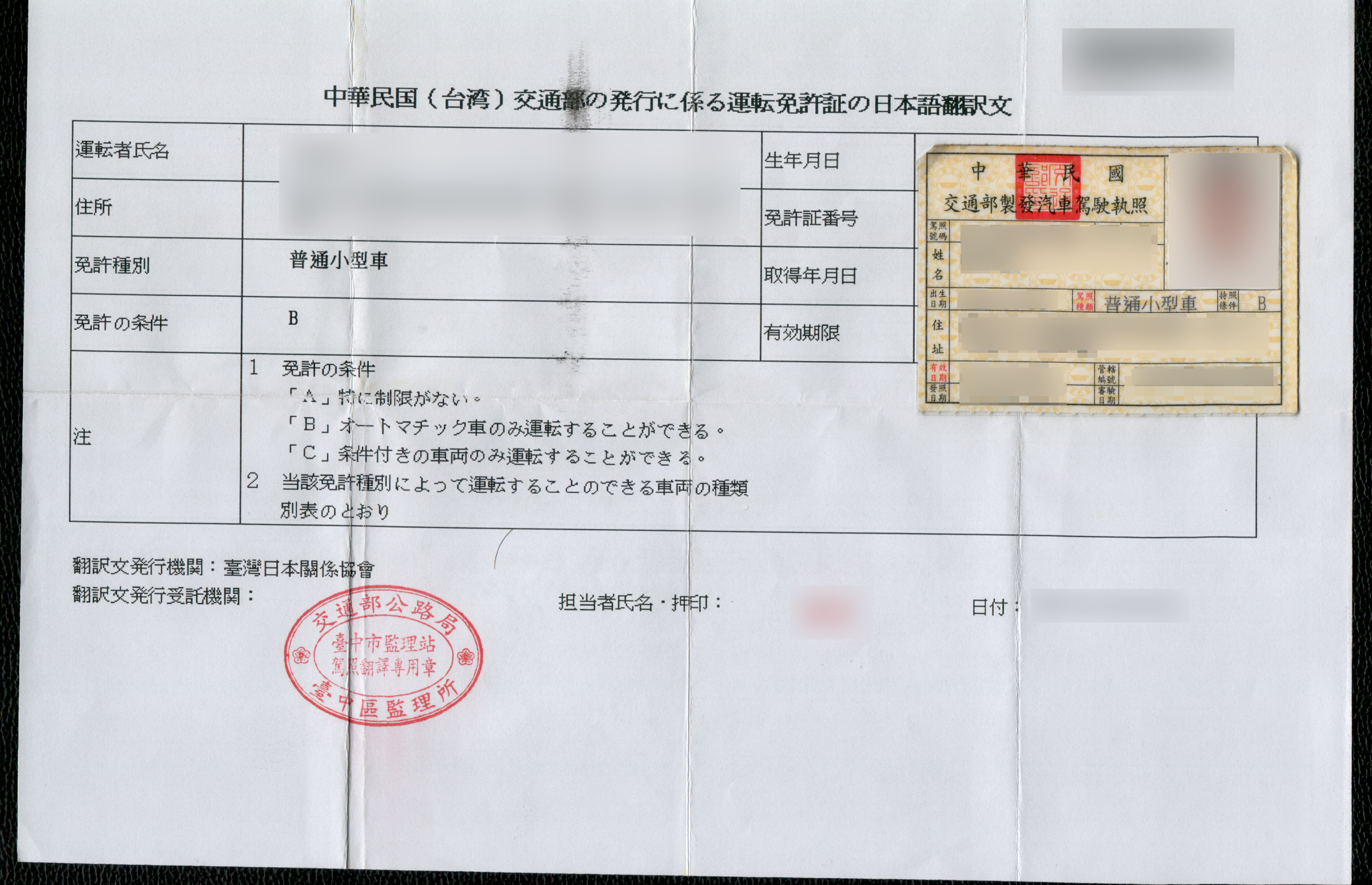
Because Japan does not recognize ROC's International Driving Permit, holders of ROC Driver's license must use a Japanese translation document to drive in Japan

The Republic of China (ROC) is a signatory of the 1968 Vienna Road Traffic Convention and recognizes the international driving licenses of all countries. However, ever since the United Nations General Assembly Resolution 2758 in 1971 which replaced the representative of "China" at the United Nations (UN) from the ROC to the People's Republic of China (PRC), many countries do not recognize the status of the ROC as a signatory state, nor do they recognize its international driving license. As a result, the ROC and must often reciprocate in the mutual recognition and renewal with test exemption for driving licenses of countries individually.

To exchange a foreign driver's license for a ROC driver's license in Taiwan, the foreign driver's license must be verified by the Taipei Economic and Cultural Representative Office or the Ministry of Foreign Affairs of the Republic of China, such as the US Driver's License notary service of the American Institute in Taiwan.

=== Exchanging a foreign license for a ROC driver's license ===
Holders of a valid full driver's license issued by a foreign, mainland China, Hong Kong or Macau government who obtained a certificate of permit to stay or stay for more than six months in Taiwan can be exempted from the test and reissued a ROC driver's license to an equivalent vehicle class upon entry, based on the principle of equality and reciprocity agreement. This only applies to licenses from certain participating authorities. ROC citizens who have a valid foreign full driver's license can be exempted from taking the test and be issued a ROC driver's license for the same type of vehicle. This applies to countries not in the reciprocity agreement.
