= Suzuki GSX250R =

Motorcycle

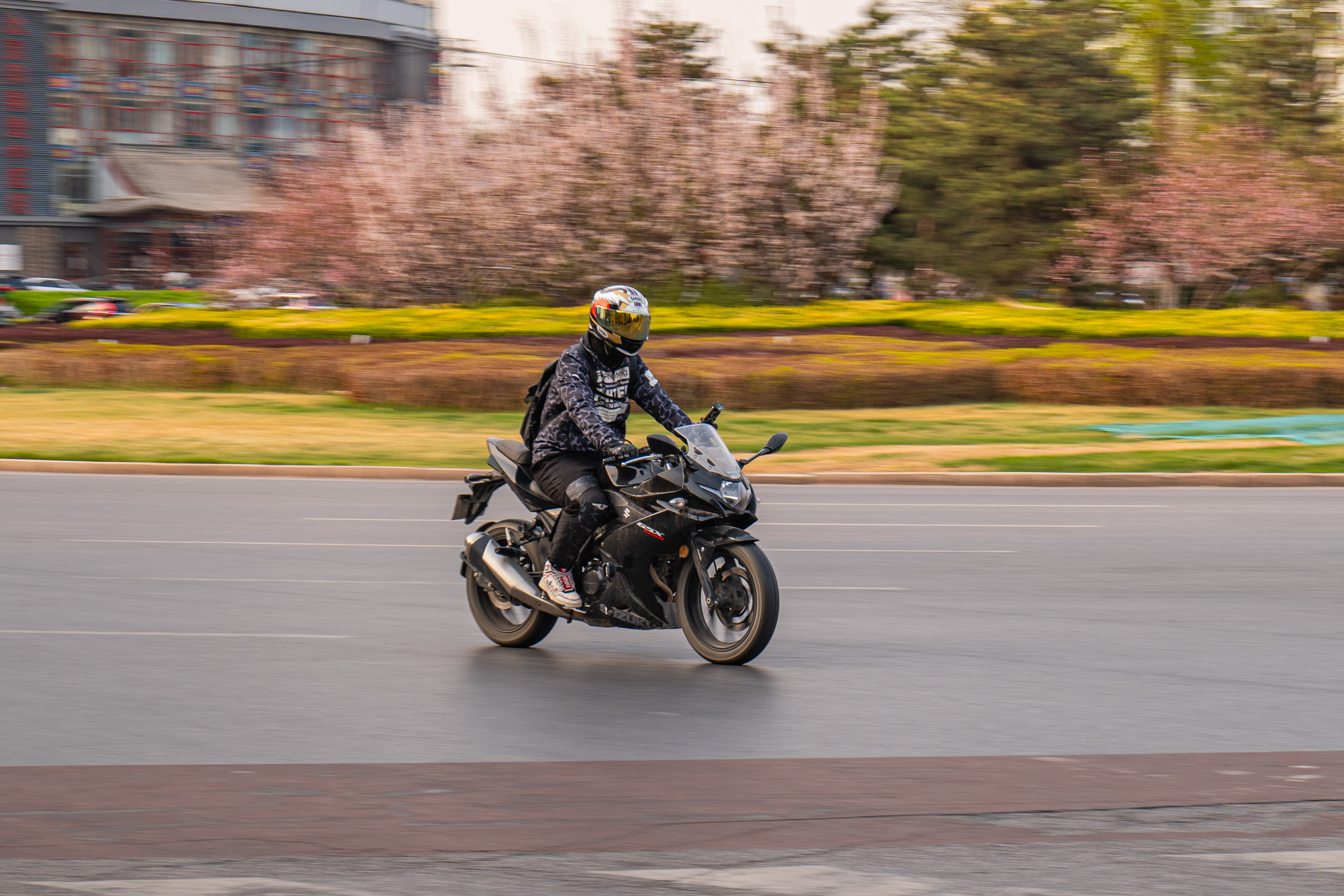
- Manufacturer: Suzuki
- Production: 2017–present
- Class: Sport bike
- Engine: 249 cc (15.2 cu in), liquid cooled, four-stroke, DOHC I2
- Bore / stroke: 53.5 mm × 55.2 mm (2.11 in × 2.17 in)
- Transmission: Six-speed manual
- Suspension: Front: telescopic fork (with air spring cylinder); Rear: swingarm
- Tires: Front: 110/80 17"; Rear: 140/70 17"
- Wheelbase: 1,430 mm (56 in)
- Dimensions: L: 2,085 mm (82.1 in); W: 740 mm (29 in); H: 1,110 mm (44 in)
- Seat height: 790 mm (31 in)
- Fuel capacity: 15 L (3.3 imp gal; 4.0 US gal)

The Suzuki GSX250R is a motorcycle produced by Suzuki since 2017.

== History ==
The GSX250R was developed based on the GSR250 (hereinafter referred to as GSR) series, in 2016, Changzhou Haojue Suzuki Motorcycle Co., Ltd., the manufacturer in China, made a preliminary announcement, and was released as a global vehicle at the EICMA in the same year. In addition, the reason why the number of displacement is written in front of R in the GSX250R is that it is positioned differently from the previously released sport bike GSX-R250.

== Specifications ==
The GSX250R features a four-stroke, two-cylinder in-line engine available in the only displacement of 248 cm^{3} (15.1 cu in). The fuel-injected engine is liquid cooled with a declared power of 25 hp (19 kW) and 23.4 N⋅m (17.3 lbf⋅ft) of torque. The front suspension used an adjustable telescopic fork, while the rear mounted a single shock absorber which was also adjustable. The braking system consists of two discs, one for each wheel. Fitted with a six-speed gearbox, the bike used a multi-disc wet clutch. The engine was housed on a steel double-spar frame.
