= Individual Number =

Japanese national identification number

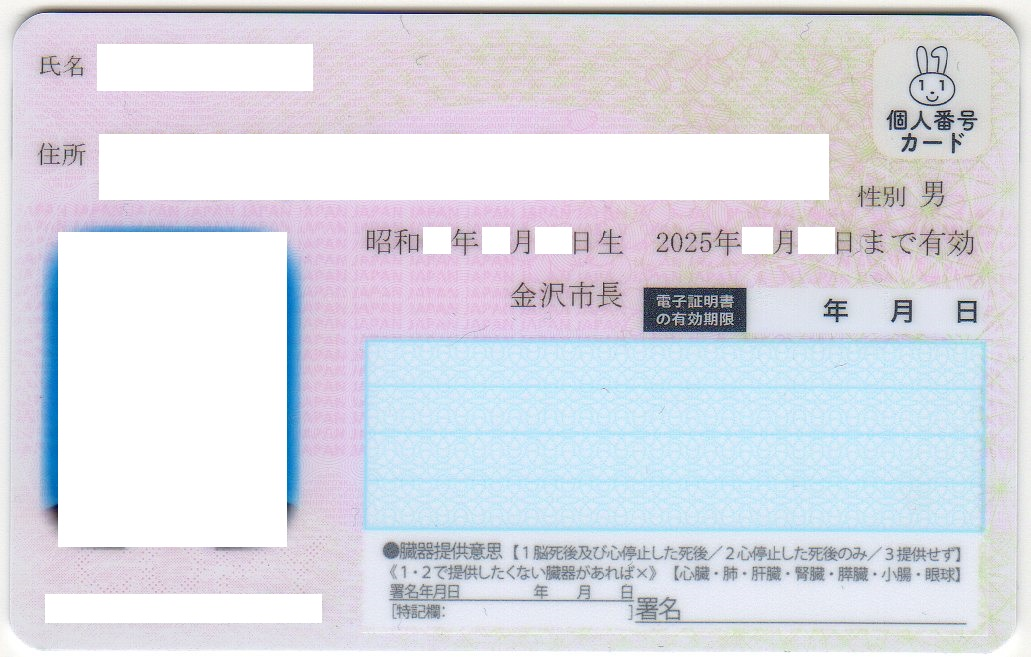
Example of Kojinbango card

An Individual Number (個人番号, kojin bangō), also known as My Number (マイナンバー, mai nambā), is a twelve-digit ID number automatically issued to all citizens and foreign residents of Japan. It is used for taxation, social security and disaster response purposes. The numbers were first issued in late 2015.

The Individual Number is the de-facto Japanese equivalent to a U.S Social Security Number (SSN), and is required when applying for a Japanese bank account. Like the SSN, the number is sensitive and should be kept safe. Once issued the bearer's Individual Number remains the same indefinitely, unless required to be changed by decree.

Individuals may write this number down and keep it in a safe location, or apply for the free My Number Card, which contains the number.

== See also ==
- My Number Card
- Corporate Number (Japan)
- Social Security number
- National identification number
