= Large two-wheel motor vehicle (Japan) =

Two-wheel motor vehicle in Japan

A large two-wheel motor vehicle (大型自動二輪車, ōgata jidō nirinsha), sometimes referred to as a heavy motorcycle, is a category of motorcycle defined under the Road Traffic Act of Japan. It refers to motorcycles with an engine displacement of over 400 cc or a rated output exceeding 20 kW. A specific driving licence is required to operate such vehicles.

Other categories include a small two-wheel motor vehicle (small motorcycle) and a standard two-wheel motor vehicle (ordinary motorcycle).

== Heavy motorcycle licence ==
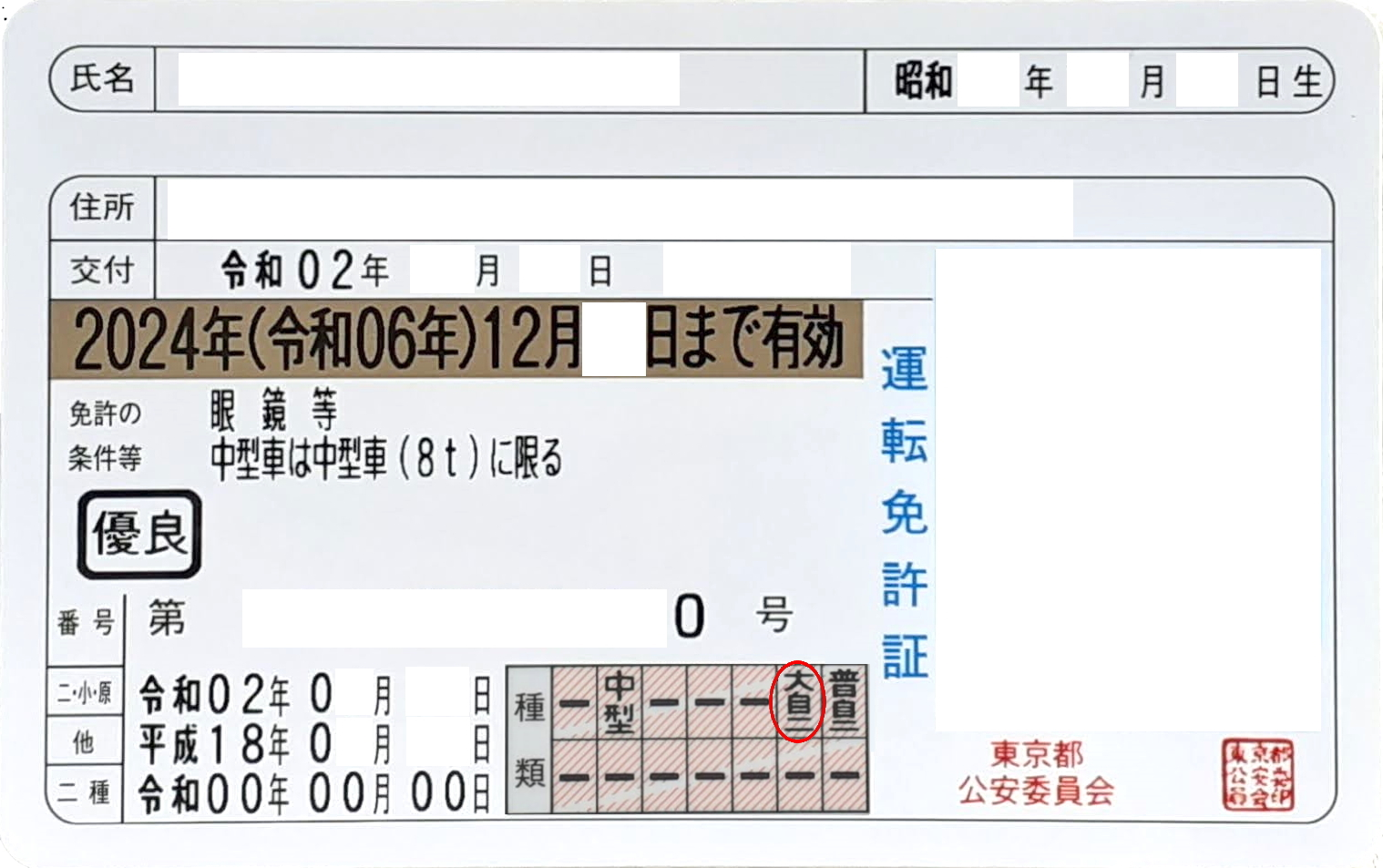
Japanese driving licence sample with category for heavy motorcycle (大自二) circled.

A licence to ride a heavy motorcycle can be obtained from the age of 18. An automatic transmission (AT) licence restricts the holder to automatic motorcycles, whereas a manual licence permits operation of both automatic and manual motorcycles. Riding a heavy motorcycle on a public road without the appropriate licence constitutes the offence of unlicensed driving.

== Licence category history ==
Heavy motorcycle and ordinary motorcycle licences have been separate categories since 1996.

In June 2005, it became possible to ride automatic transmission motorcycles exceeding 400 cc with a heavy motorcycle AT licence.

In December 2019, the displacement limit for automatic transmission heavy motorcycles was removed, allowing operation of motorcycles of any displacement with a heavy motorcycle AT licence. This change applied both to newly issued licences and to existing licence holders. From the same date, motorcycles powered by electric motors or other non-internal combustion power sources have also been classified as heavy motorcycles when their rated output exceeds 20 kW.

== History of the 750 cc distinction ==
Historically, heavy motorcycles in Japan were commonly referred to as "nanahan" (ナナハン) (literally, "seven and a half"), reflecting the widespread 750 cc displacement limit.

This originated when the Honda CB750FOUR was introduced, as its performance exceeded 200 km/h (120 mph). The National Police Agency, concerned about high speeds, requested manufacturers to adopt a voluntary limit restricting motorcycles sold domestically to 750 cc.

As a result, manufacturers such as Kawasaki motorcycles developed models like the Z2, a reduced-displacement version of the Z1. Similar adaptations were made across the industry until the mid-1980s.

The voluntary restriction was abolished in 1988, after which motorcycles with engine displacements exceeding 1,000 cc became widely available in Japan. However, some practices influenced by the earlier distinction remain; for example, ferry transport fees may still vary depending on whether a motorcycle's displacement exceeds 750 cc.

== Categories ==
Some of the vehicle categories under Japanese law are as follows:

Name	Japanese	Description
Moped	原動機付自転車	Any motorcycle with engine displacement of 50 cc or less.
Small motorcycle	小型自動二輪車	Any motorcycle with engine displacement over 50 cc but no more than 125 cc.
Ordinary motorcycle	普通自動二輪車	Any motorcycle with engine displacement over 125 cc but no more than 400 cc.
Heavy motorcycle	大型自動二輪車	Any motorcycle with engine displacement over 400 cc.

== Other details ==
Licence type	Minimum age	Displacement	Loading capacity	Legal speed limit (general roads)	Expressway riding	Pillion riding	Bus lane riding
Moped	16	Up to 50 cc	30 kg (66 lb)	30 km/h (19 mph)	No	No	Yes
Small motorcycle (incl. AT)	16	Up to 125 cc	60 kg (130 lb)	60 km/h (37 mph)	No	Yes (1 year after licence acquisition)	No
Ordinary motorcycle (incl. AT)	16	Up to 400 cc	60 kg (130 lb)	60 km/h (37 mph)	Yes	Yes (1 year after licence acquisition)	No
Heavy motorcycle (incl. AT)	18	No limit	60 kg (130 lb)	60 km/h (37 mph)	Yes	Yes (1 year after licence acquisition)	No

== Applicability in other countries ==
Great Britain has a licence exchange agreement with Japan (and several other countries and regions), allowing holders of a Japanese large motorcycle licence (大型二輪) who are resident in the United Kingdom to exchange it for an equivalent British licence (Category A). Applicants must submit their licence, an official translation, an application form, and the required fee to the Driver and Vehicle Licensing Agency (DVLA), or to the Driver and Vehicle Agency (DVA) in Northern Ireland.

== Gallery ==
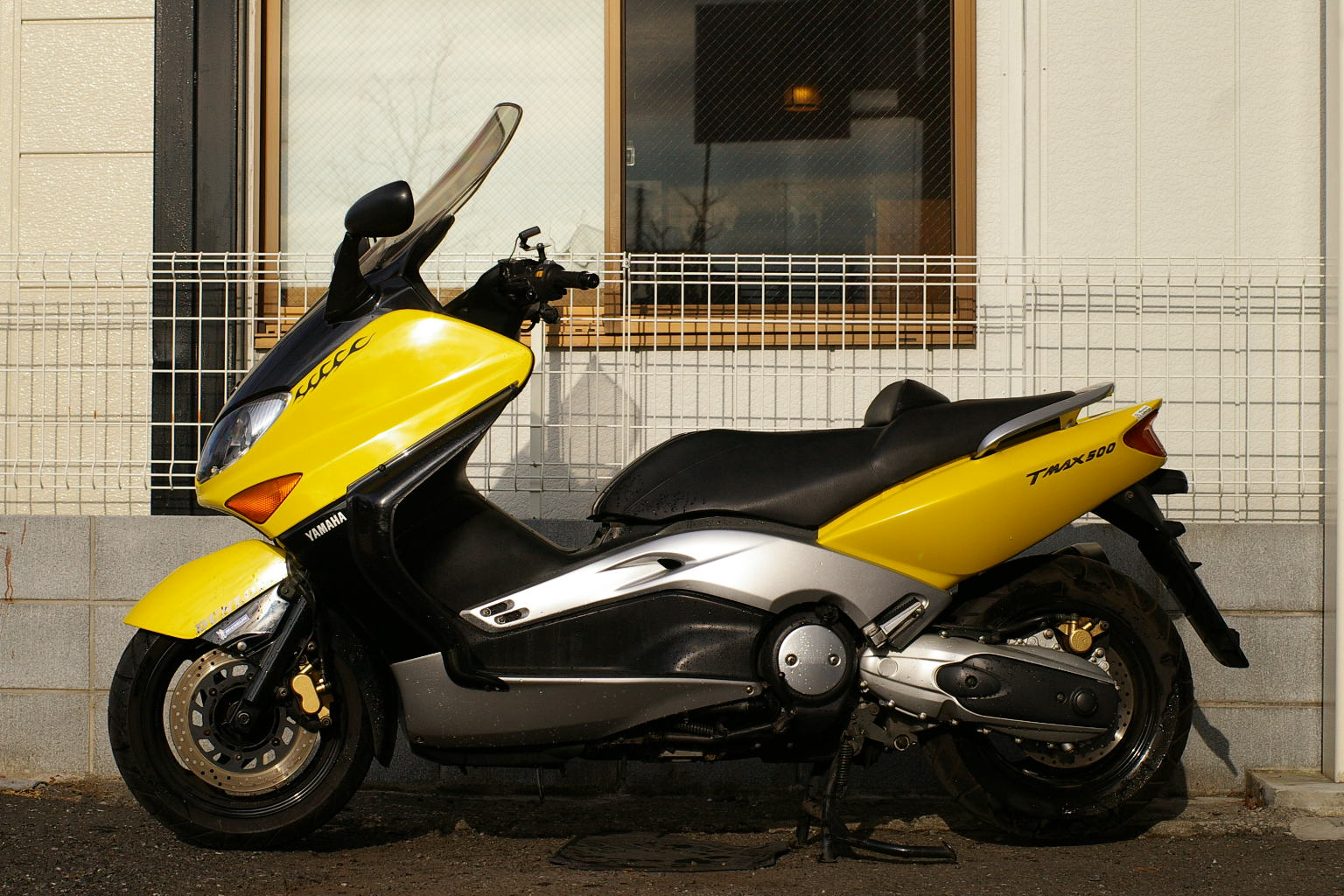
Yamaha TMAX 500 (499 cc)

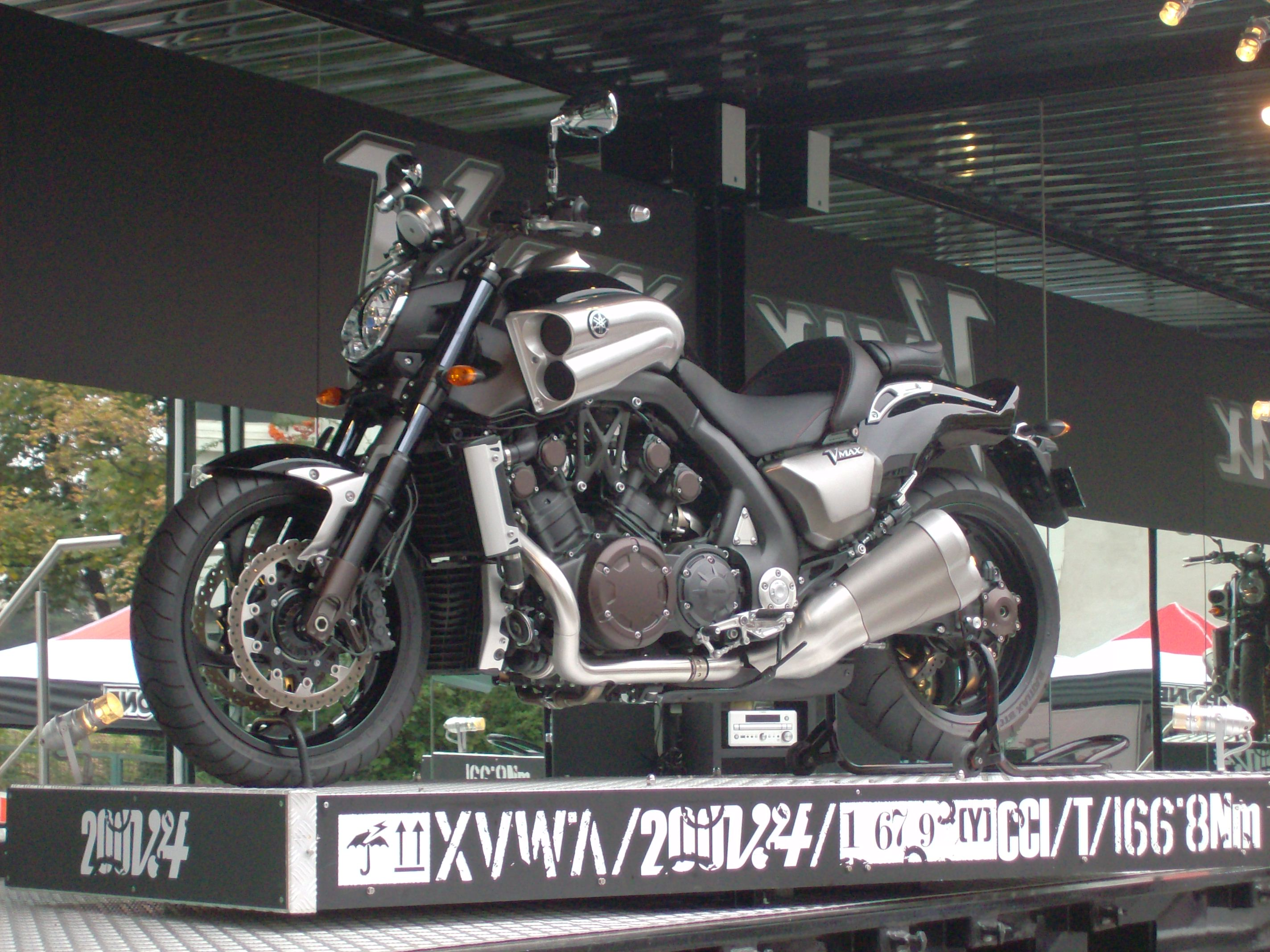
Yamaha VMAX (1,679 cc)

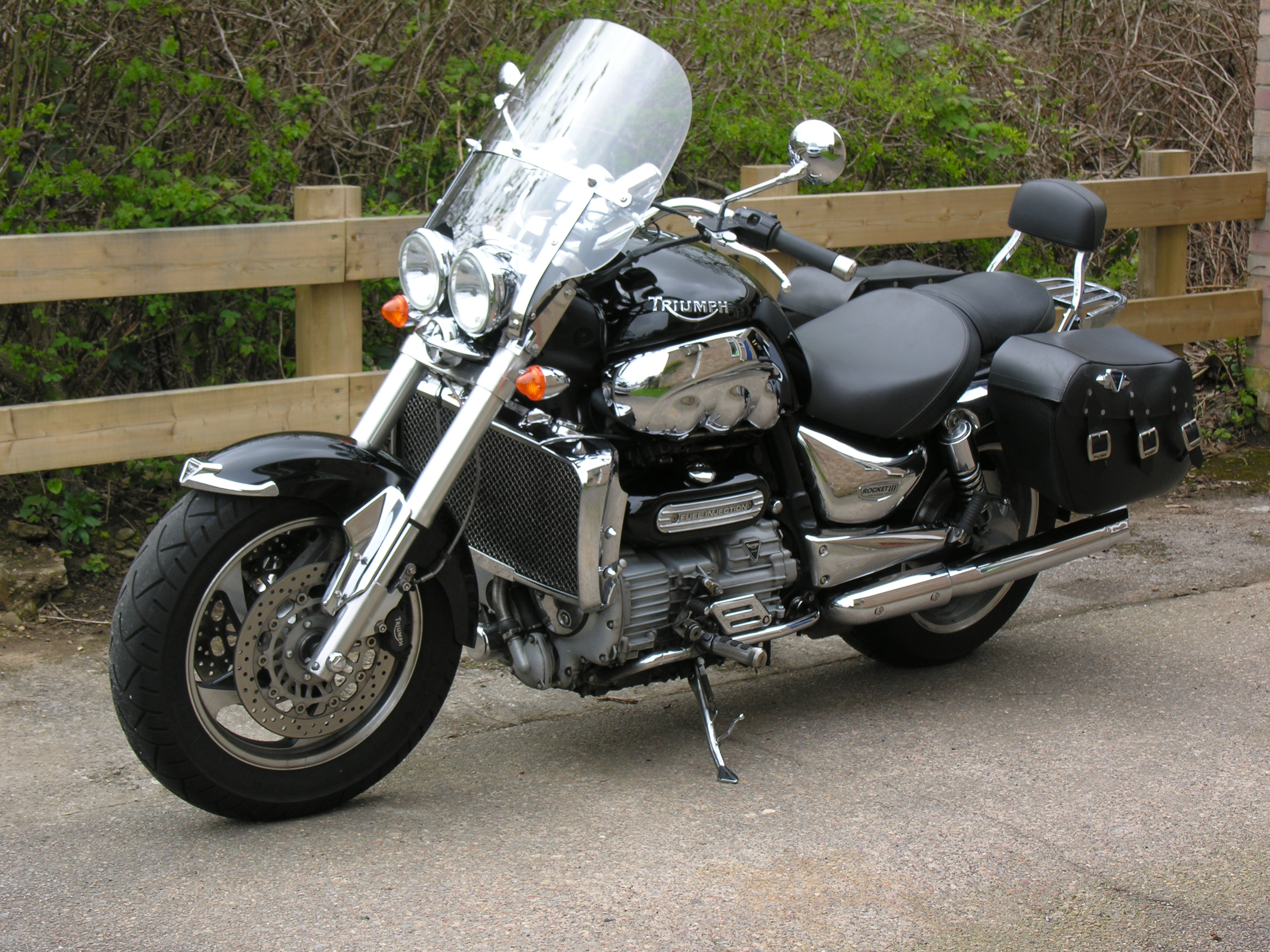
Triumph Rocket III (2,294 cc)

== See also ==
- Bōsōzoku
- Mopeds in Japan
- Small two-wheel motor vehicle (Japan)
- Standard two-wheel motor vehicle (Japan)
