= Basic Resident Registry Network =

Japanese national registry

The Basic Resident Registers Network (住民基本台帳ネットワーク, Jūmin kihon daichō nettowāku) also known as Juki Net (住基ネット, Jūki netto) is a national registry of Japanese citizens and foreign residents in Japan. Established in 2002 by the Japanese government, the network is compiled of resident records provided by a respective municipal authority.

== History ==
The initial phase of the network started on August 5, 2002, which implemented, literally, Three statutes for online government and local government executive procedure on June 7, 2003, and full operation on August 25, 2003.

== Criticism ==
The Basic Resident Registry Network was met with widespread opposition from people, political parties, and prefectures. Despite this, In 2008, the Supreme Court of Japan ruled the Basic Resident Registers Network and subsequent affiliations constitutional.

Among more than 1,700 local governments in Japan, only two (Kunitachi, Tokyo and Yamatsuri, Fukushima) have refused to join the network as of May 2009. In 2010, Nagoya withdrew from the network.

The registry is opposed by the Democratic Party of Japan, the Liberal Party, the Japanese Communist Party and the Social Democratic Party.

== See also ==
- Jūminhyō
