= Jūminhyō =

Japanese residential address register

A jūminhyō (住民票) (resident record or residence certificate) is a document issued by municipalities in Japan proving the registry of one's current residential address in Japan. Japanese law requires all Japanese citizens and foreign residents to report their current address to their local municipal government. Once registered with the municipality, a jūminhyō can be issued to enable the bearer to apply for various social services pertaining to that municipality, like registering one's children at a local school district, and provide information to the municipality regarding taxes and census purposes. A jūminhyō can be issued by the respective local municipal government or at a convenience store in the area.

Information pertaining to ones jūminhyō is shared with the Japanese government through the Basic Resident Registry Network.

== Honorary jūminhyō ==
Local authorities occasionally issue honorary jūminhyō to animals, as well as statues, snowmen, and fictional characters. In February, 2002, Nishi Ward office in Yokohama issued an honorary jūminhyō to Tama-chan, an arctic bearded seal who took up residence in the rivers of Yokohama and Tokyo and became a national celebrity.

The manga character Astro Boy was issued an honorary jūminhyō by Niiza, Saitama.

== See also ==
- Basic Resident Registers Network or "Juki Net"
